= Tamaraw (disambiguation) =

Tamaraw is a species of buffalo.

Tamaraw or tamaraws may refer to:

- FEU Tamaraws, varsity teams of Far Eastern University
- Toyota Tamaraws, former name of the Toyota Super Corollas, a defunct professional basketball team
- Mindoro Tamaraws, former name of the Mindoro Disiplinados basketball team
- Tamaraw FX, name in the Philippines of the Toyota Kijang, a pick-up truck
