= Philippine two-peso coin =

Two pesos
- Philippines
- Value: 2.00 Philippine peso
- Mass: 5.00 g
- Diameter: 24.00 mm
- Edge: Plain (Flora and Fauna Series); Reeded (Improved Flora and Fauna Series)
- Composition: Copper-nickel (1983–1990); Stainless steel (1991–1994)
- Years of minting: 1861–1868; 1983–1994

Obverse
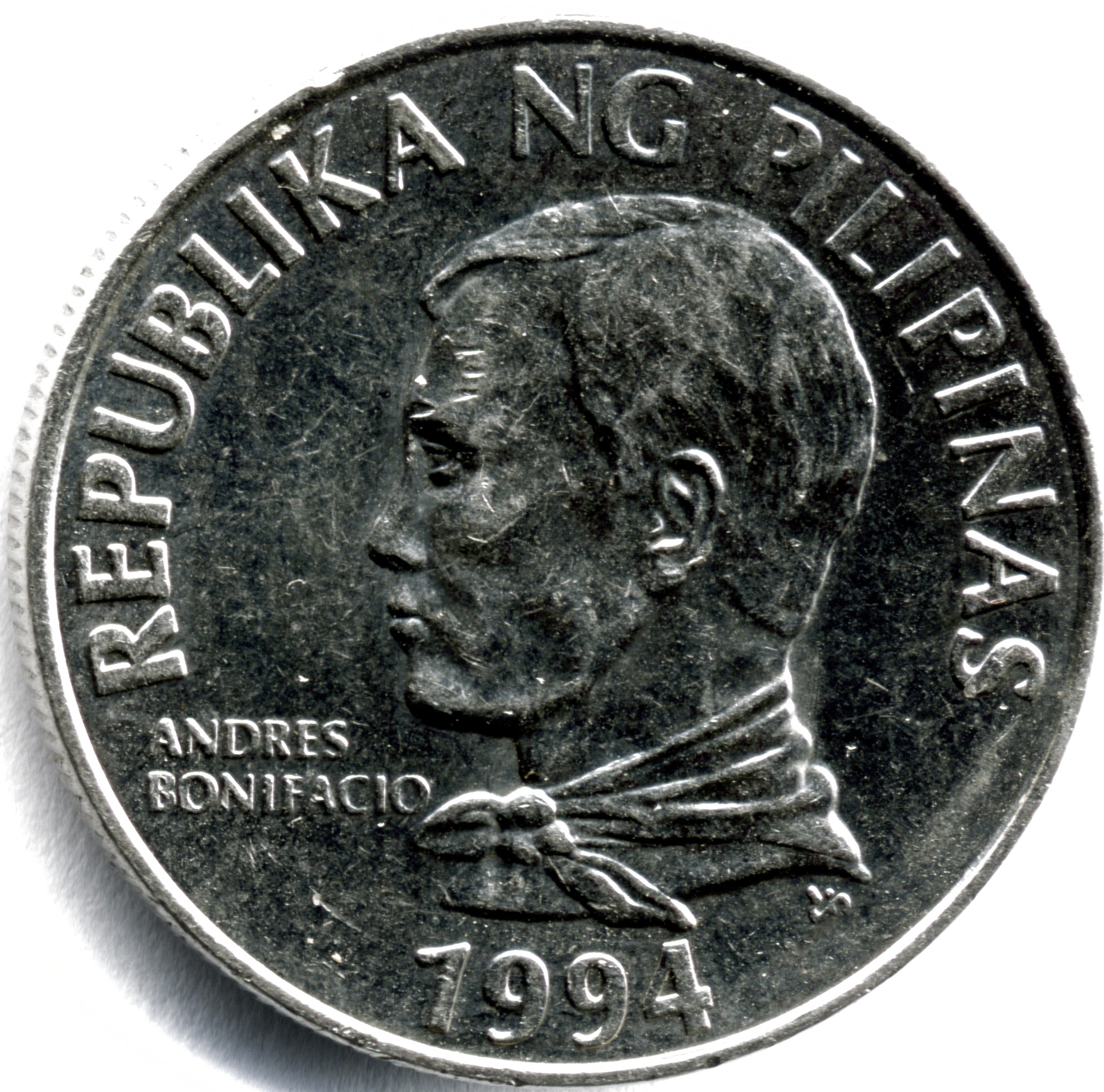
- Design: State title, Andrés Bonifacio, year of minting
- Design date: 1991

Reverse
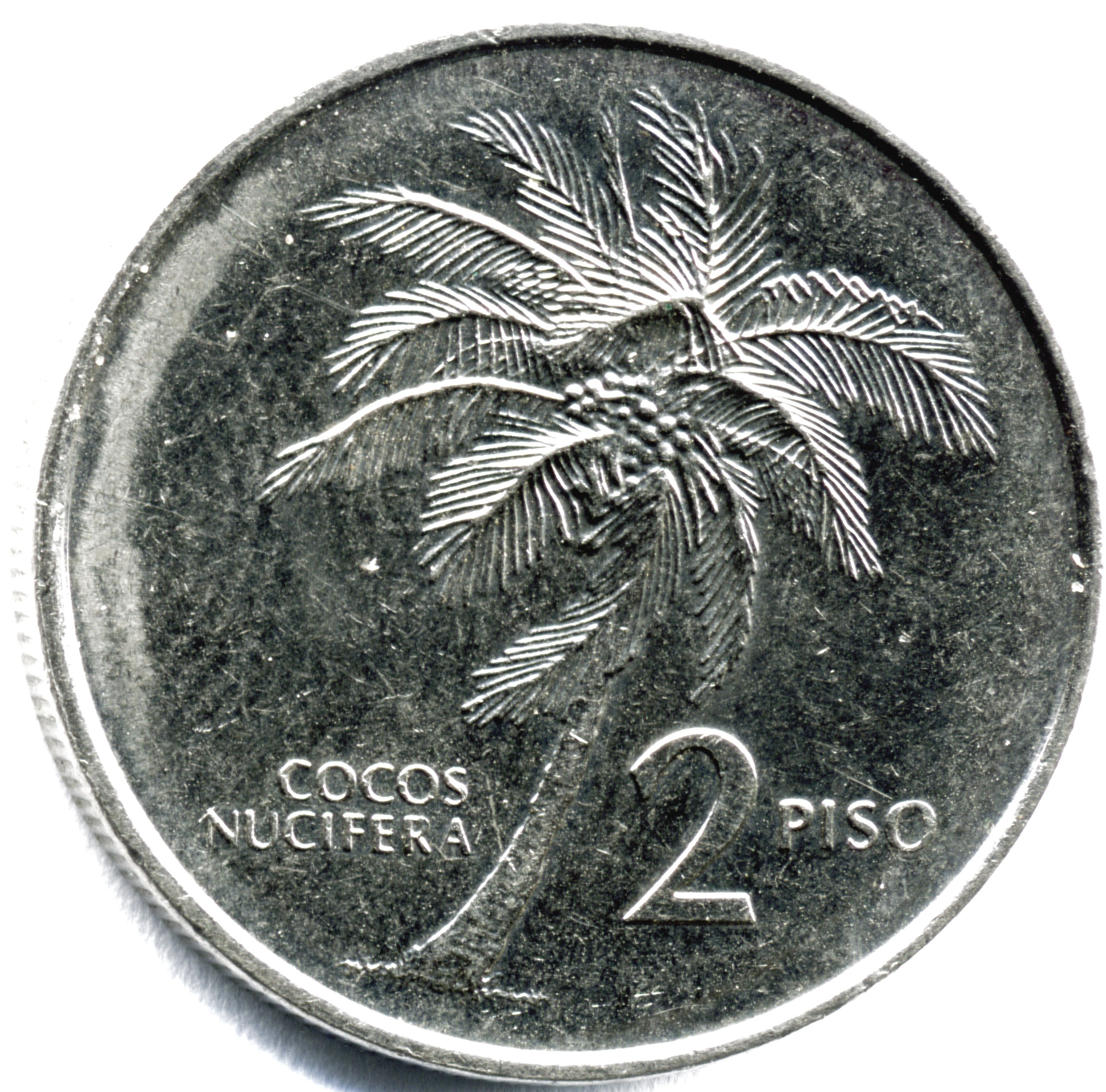
- Design: Cocos nucifera (Coconut Tree), Value
- Design date: 1991

The Philippine two-peso coin (Filipino: Dalawang piso) (₱2) was a denomination of Philippine currency. It was minted by the Bangko Sentral ng Pilipinas from 1983 to 1994 and was demonetized in 1998.

== History ==
=== Spanish ===
- 1861: The two-peso gold coin was introduced by the Spaniards, containing 3.38 grams of 0.875 fine gold. The coin featured a left-sided profile of Isabel II on its obverse, while the reverse has the coat of arms of Spain with the lettering “REINA DE LAS ESPAÑAS”.

=== Independence ===
- Flora and Fauna Series; On September 30, 1983, the BSP introduced ₱2 coins as part of the Flora and Fauna Series. The coin was decagon-shaped (ten-sided), mass 12.0 g and diameter 31.0 mm, with the profile of Andrés Bonifacio on the obverse and the Coconut Tree (Cocos nucifera) on the reverse.
- Improved Flora and Fauna Series; The coin features the same designs on both the obverse and reverse, but was reduced in mass to 5.0 g, reduced in diameter to 24.0 mm, made circular in shape, and was minted in stainless steel instead of copper-nickel. It is about the same size as the one-peso coin of its successor BSP Series.
- BSP Series; The two-peso coin was not included when the BSP Series was introduced.
- 1998: The ₱2 coin and other coins in the original Flora and Fauna and Improved Flora and Fauna Series were withdrawn, making the coin officially demonetized.

=== Version history ===
| | Flora and Fauna Series | |
| | 1983–1990 | 1991–1994 |
|---|---|---|
| Obverse | | |
| Reverse | | |
