= Flora and Fauna Series =

Piso ng Pilipinas (Filipino)

Demographics
- User(s): Philippines

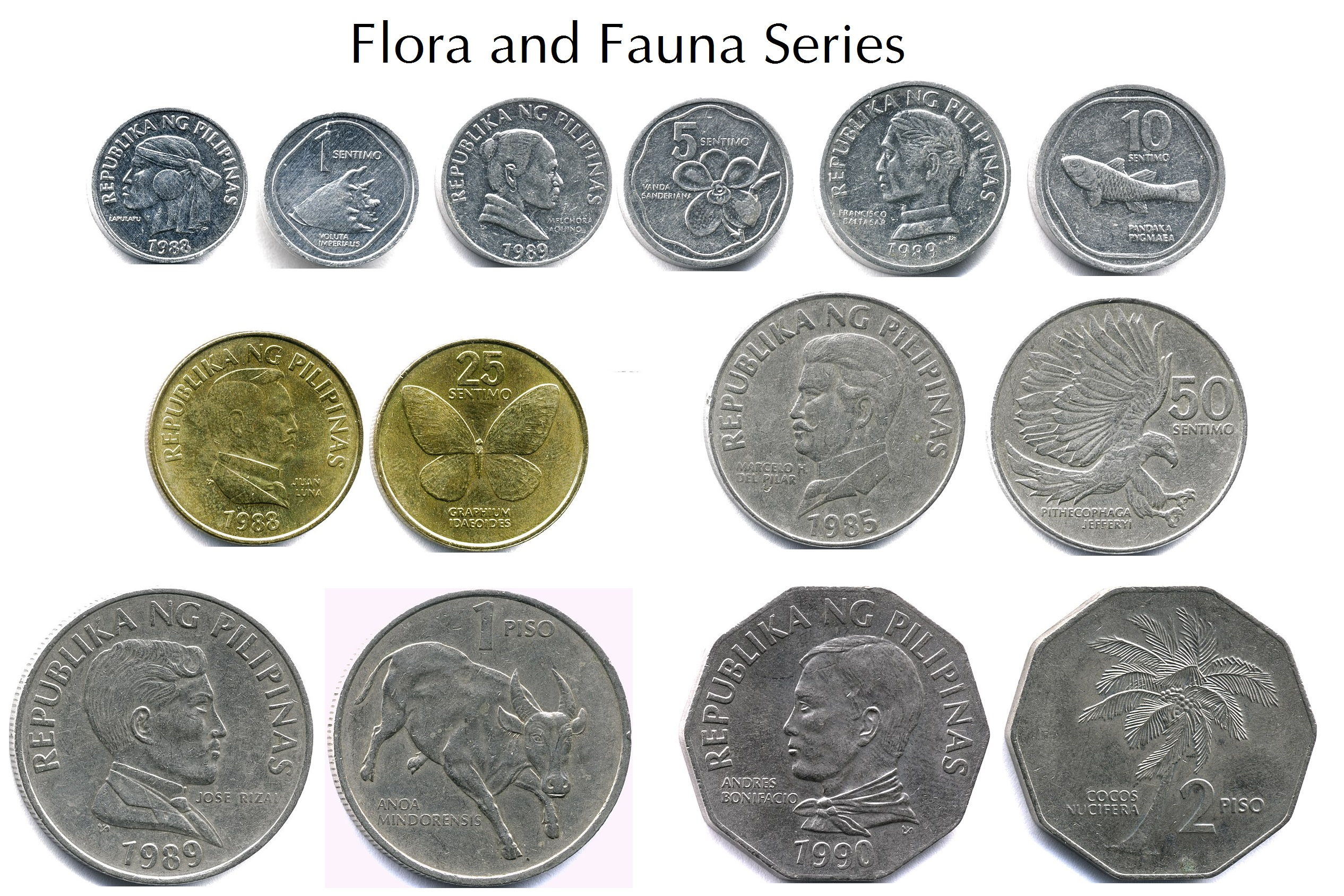
The original 1983 Flora and Fauna Series of the Philippine peso (1¢ (1983–1993), 5¢ (1983–1992), 10¢ (1983–1994), 25¢, 50¢, ₱1, and ₱2 (1983–1990)))

The Flora and Fauna Series (Tagalog: Seryeng Flora at Fauna) was a series of Philippine peso coins minted from 1983 to 1994, in denominations from 1 sentimo to ₱2. The series used the Optima typeface as its main text. The sizes of the coins were reduced in 1991 (except 1 to 10-sentimo coins), and the ₱5 coins were reintroduced in 1991. Production of 50-sentimo and ₱2 coins ceased in 1995.

== History ==
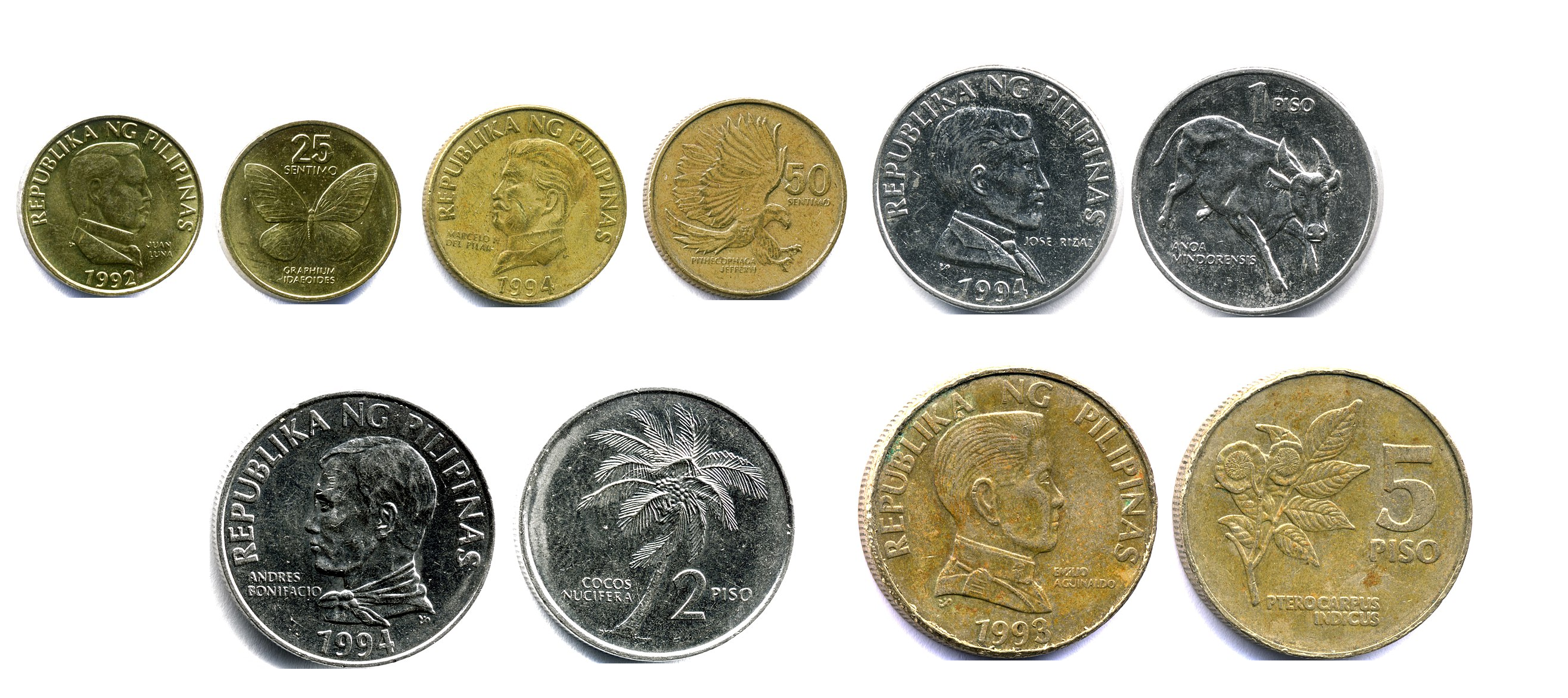
The Improved Flora and Fauna Series of the Philippine peso. These were minted from 1991 to 1994.

In 1983, eight years after the introduction of the Ang Bagong Lipunan Series, a new series named the Flora and Fauna Series was introduced, in which the coins, in addition to featuring various Philippine national heroes as before, also began featuring plant and animal life forms native to the Philippines. The 50-sentimo and 2-piso denominations were reintroduced, the latter of which had not been struck as a coin since the Spanish had struck it in gold. The 5-piso denomination was stopped, but production resumed (in a new, smaller size) in the final four years of the Flora and Fauna Series, which featured reduced sizes for all denominations (except the one- to ten-sentimo coins).

The Flora and Fauna series had reported errors on two coins, in 1983. The text on the 10-sentimo coin for the scientific name of the Philippine goby was minted as "Pandaka pygmea" instead of "Pandaka pygmaea", and the 50-sentimo coin showed the misspelled version of the scientific name of the Philippine eagle as "Pithecobhaga jefferyi" instead of "Pithecophaga jefferyi".

In 1985, some of the 1-peso and 25-sentimo coins had a double strike error. The year 1987 for the 25-sentimo and 1-piso coins is considered one of the lowest mintage years in selected denominations of the series, with mintages of lower than 2 million.

In April 1, 1991, the Improved Flora and Fauna Series was introduced. The denominations from 25 sentimo up to 2 peso were smaller, and the 5-peso coin was reintroduced. The last commemorative coin using the original 1983 larger size and copper-nickel composition is the 2 peso Jose Laurel centennial coin in 1990, minted 1,000 of them with a total of 2,000 pesos.

The size of the 25- and 50-sentimo coins of the Improved Flora and Fauna Series were same as the size of the twenty-five-satang and fifty-satang coins of Thailand, which the 50-sentimo (IFF series) and 50-satang coins (Thailand) both have reeded edges, while the 2-peso had the same size as its successor BSP Series 1-peso coin.

Flora and Fauna Series (1983–2020)
Image		Face Value	Technical parameters				Description			Year of	
Image		Face Value	Diameter	Thickness	Mass	Composition	Edge	Obverse	Reverse	Year of	
Obverse	Reverse	Face Value	Diameter	Thickness	Mass	Composition	Edge	Obverse	Reverse	Introduction	Demonetization
		1¢	15.5 mm	1.67mm	0.70 g	Aluminum and Magnesium; 99.2% Al; 0.8% Mg	Plain	State title, Lapulapu, year of minting	Voluta imperialis, Value	September 30, 1983	January 2, 1998
		5¢	17.0 mm	2.08mm	1.20 g	Aluminum and Magnesium; 99.2% Al; 0.8% Mg	Plain	State title, Melchora Aquino, year of minting	Vanda sanderiana (Waling-waling), Value	September 30, 1983	January 2, 1998
		10¢	19.0 mm	2.3mm	1.50 g	Aluminum and Magnesium; 99.2% Al; 0.8% Mg	Plain	State title, Francisco Baltazar, value, year of minting	Pandaka pygmaea (Philippine Goby), Value	September 30, 1983	January 2, 1998
		25¢	21.0 mm	1.68mm	3.9 g	Brass (65% copper; 35% zinc)	Reeded	State title, Juan Luna, year of minting	Graphium idaeoides, Value	September 30, 1983	January 2, 1998
		50¢	25.0 mm	1.62mm	6 g	Copper-nickel; 75% Cu; 25% Ni	Plain	State title, Marcelo H. del Pilar, year of minting	Pithecophaga jefferyi (Philippine Eagle), Value	September 30, 1983	January 2, 1998
		₱1	29.0 mm	1.9mm	9.5 g	Copper-nickel; 75% Cu; 25% Ni	Reeded	State title, José Rizal, year of minting	Anoa mindorensis (Tamaraw), Value	September 30, 1983 (regular issue); 1989 (commemorative coins)	January 2, 1998 (regular issue); May 1, 2020 (commemorative coins)
		₱2	31 mm (across corners, decagon); 29.8 mm (across flats, decagon)	2mm	12 g	Copper-nickel; 75% Cu; 25% Ni	Plain	State title, Andrés Bonifacio, year of minting	Cocos nucifera (Coconut Tree), Value	September 30, 1983 (regular issue); 1990 (commemorative coins)	January 2, 1998 (regular issue); May 1, 2020 (commemorative coins)
Improved Flora and Fauna Series (1991–2020)
		25¢	16.0 mm	1.4mm	2.24 g	Brass	Plain	State title, Juan Luna, year of minting	Graphium idaeoides, Value	April 1, 1991	January 2, 1998
		50¢	18 mm	1.5mm	3 g	Brass	Reeded	State title, Marcelo H. del Pilar, year of minting	Pithecophaga jefferyi (Philippine Eagle), Value	April 1, 1991	January 2, 1998
		₱1	21.6 mm	1.7mm	4 g	Stainless steel	Plain	State title, José Rizal, year of minting	Anoa mindorensis (Tamaraw), Value	April 1, 1991 (regular issue); April 9, 1992 (commemorative coins)	January 2, 1998 (regular issue); May 1, 2020 (commemorative coins)
		₱2	23.5 mm	1.8 mm	5 g	Stainless steel	Reeded	State title, Andrés Bonifacio, year of minting	Cocos nucifera (Coconut Tree), Value	April 1, 1991 (regular issue); 1992 (commemorative coins)	January 2, 1998 (regular issue); May 1, 2020 (commemorative coins)
		₱5	25.5 mm	2.6mm	9.45 g	Nickel-brass	Reeded	State title, Emilio Aguinaldo, year of minting	Pterocarpus indicus (Narra), Value	April 1, 1991 (regular issue); June 7, 1992 (commemorative coins)	January 2, 1998 (regular issue); May 1, 2020 (commemorative coins)

== See also ==
- Coins of the Philippine peso
- Philippine two peso coin
- Philippine peso
- Coins of the Philippine peso
