= Peso sign =

Currency symbol

A peso sign is a currency symbol used by a number of countries around the world. As of 2025, the peso sign in Unicode, U+20B1 ₱ PESO SIGN, is used only by The Philippines. All the others use U+0024 $ DOLLAR SIGN, which is also known locally as the peso sign.

== History of the $ as a peso sign ==
The Spanish dollar coins provided the model for the currency that the United States adopted in 1792, and for the larger coins of the new Spanish American republics, such as the Mexican peso, Argentine peso, Peruvian real, and Bolivian sol coin: "the famous dollar sign is a reversed and slightly modified Spanish peso sign".

== Countries that use pesos ==
Country	Currency	ISO 4217 code	Symbol
Argentina	Argentine peso	ARP	$
Chile	Chilean peso	CLP	$
Colombia	Colombian peso	COP	$
Cuba	Cuban peso	CUP	$
Dominican Republic	Dominican peso	DOP	RD$
Mexico	Mexican peso	MXN	$
Philippines	Philippine peso (piso)	PHP	₱
Uruguay	Uruguayan peso	UYU	$
