= Philippine one-peso coin =

One peso
- Philippines
- Value: 1.00 Philippine peso
- Mass: 6 g
- Diameter: 24.00 mm
- Thickness: 2.05 mm
- Edge: Round/Segmented (Plain and Reeded sections)
- Composition: Nickel-plated steel
- Years of minting: 1861–present

Obverse
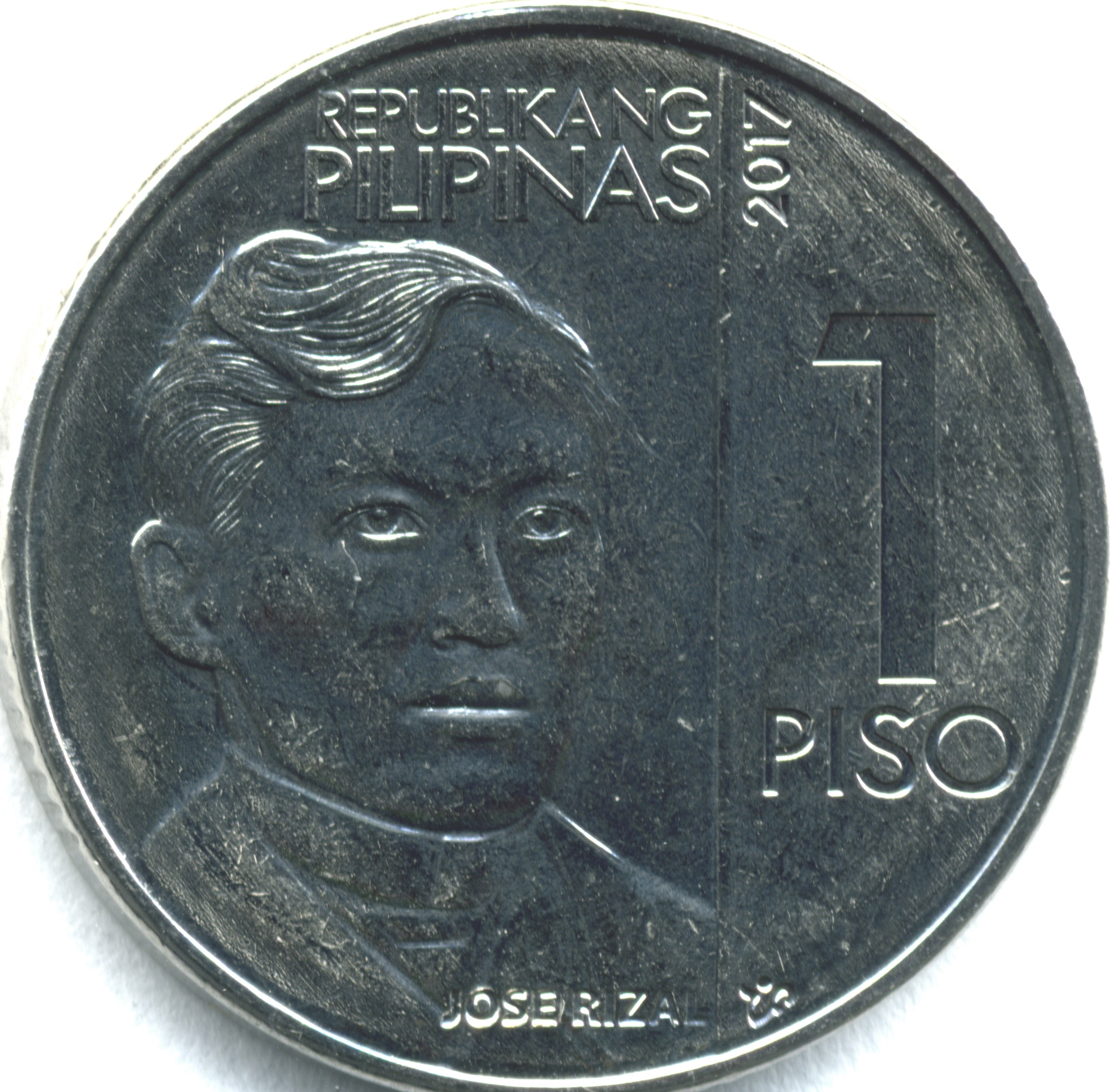
- Design: Portrait of José Rizal, Year Mark
- Design date: 2017

Reverse
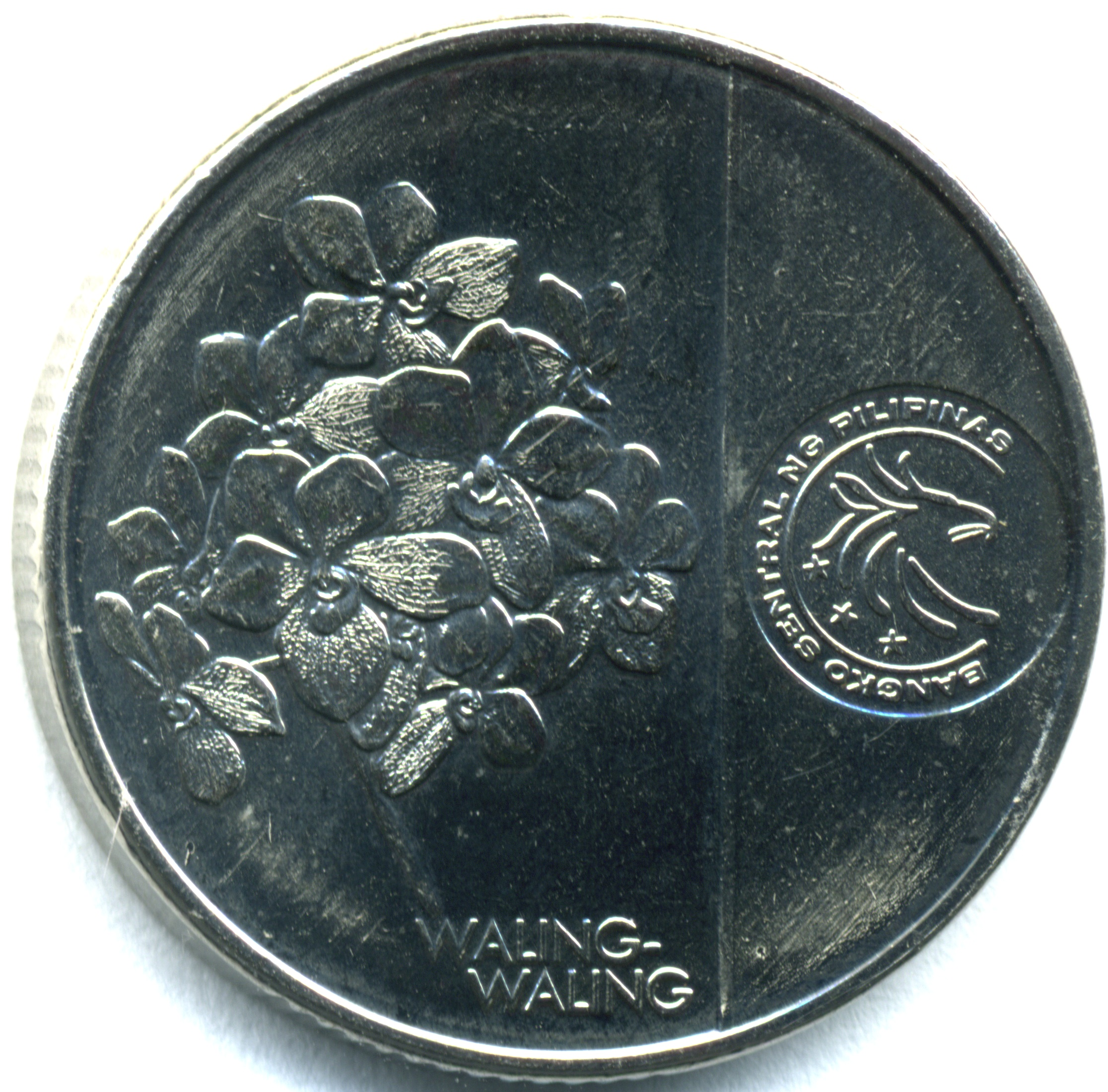
- Design: Waling-waling, Logo of the Bangko Sentral ng Pilipinas
- Design date: 2017

The Philippine one-peso coin (₱1) is the fourth-largest denomination coin of the Philippine peso.

The current version, issued in 2017, features a portrait of Philippine national hero, José Rizal on the obverse. The reverse side features the Waling-waling orchid and the current logo of the Bangko Sentral ng Pilipinas.

== History ==
=== Spanish administration ===
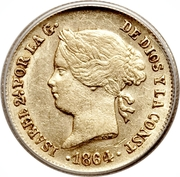
1-peso coin issued under Spanish administration, 1864

Prior to 1861, Spanish dollars (pesos) or eight-real coins issued by Spain and Spanish America were generally accepted in the Philippines. In 1861, a gold 1-peso coin specifically for the Philippines was issued weighing 1.69 grams (0.060 oz) of 0.875 fine gold. In 1897, a silver 1-peso coin specifically for the Philippines was issued weighing 25.0 grams (0.88 oz) of 0.9 fine silver.

=== United States administration ===
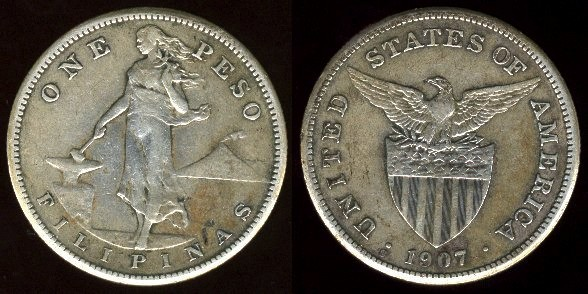
1-peso coin issued under US administration, 1907

In 1903 the 1-peso coin equivalent to half a U.S. dollar was minted for the Philippines, weighing 26.96 grams (0.951 oz) of 0.9 fine silver. Its specifications were reduced from 1907 to 1912 to 20.0 grams (0.71 oz) of 0.8 fine silver. This was minted in quantity and widely kept in Philippine banks until the start of the Second World War when several million pesos were thrown off Corregidor rather than be surrendered to the Imperial Japanese.

=== Independence ===
==== Pilipino Series ====
From 1972 to 1974, the one peso was reintroduced, making it the largest denomination of the series. The nickel-brass coin bears the denomination and a profile of José Rizal, a writer and a key member of the Filipino Propaganda Movement which advocated political reforms for the colony under Spain, faced to the left on the obverse, while the year of minting, the inscription 'Republika ng Pilipinas' and its official coat of arms, are all on the reverse.

==== Ang Bagong Lipunan Series ====
From 1975 to 1982, a new one peso coin was issued. The obverse now bears the inscription 'Republika ng Pilipinas' and a portrait of Rizal now faced to the right. The year of minting, the inscription 'Ang Bagong Lipunan' and the official coat of arms of the Philippines, are all on the reverse.

==== Flora and Fauna Series ====
From September 30, 1983 to 1990 and April 1, 1991 to 1994, two new one-peso coins were issued, the latter of a smaller size concurrent to the last four years of the series. The obverse now features the year of minting and a profile of Rizal faced on the right on the obverse. An image of Anoa mindorensis, or, ambiguously, tamaraw, an animal native to the Philippines, and the denomination, are all on the reverse.

==== BSP Coin series ====
Issued from 1995 to 2003 in copper-nickel and from 2003 to 2017 in nickel-plated steel, the coin features an enlarged denomination on the obverse, while the inscription 'Bangko Sentral ng Pilipinas' and its official seal are all on the reverse. The profile of Rizal from its predecessors Flora and Fauna Series and Improved Flora and Fauna Series retained in this series albeit in a smaller size.

Since August 2006, it has been known that the one-peso coin of this series has the same size as the 1 dirham coin of the United Arab Emirates. This has led to the one-peso coins being used for vending machine fraud in the United Arab Emirates. Its size is also identical to the Philippine two-peso coin of Improved Flora and Fauna Series from April 1, 1991 to 1994.

==== New Generation Currency Coin Series ====
Issued in 2017, the new one-peso coin features a portrait of José Rizal, denomination and year of issue on the obverse. The reverse design features the Waling-waling orchid along with the logo of the Bangko Sentral ng Pilipinas.

=== Version history ===
	Pilipino Series (1972–1974)	Ang Bagong Lipunan Series (1975–1982)	Flora and Fauna Series (Larger version: 1983–1990, Smaller version: 1991–1994)	BSP Coin Series (1995–2017)	New Generation Currency Coin Series (2017–present)
Obverse					
Reverse					

Years	Material	Weight (grams)
1861–1865	Gold	1.69
1897	Silver	25
1903–1906	Silver	26.96
1907–1935	Silver	20
1972–1974	Nickel-brass	16
1975–1990	Cupronickel	9.5
1991–1994	Stainless steel	4
1995–2003	Cupronickel	6.1
2003–2017	Nickel-plated steel	5.35
2017–present	Nickel-plated steel	6

== Commemorative coins ==
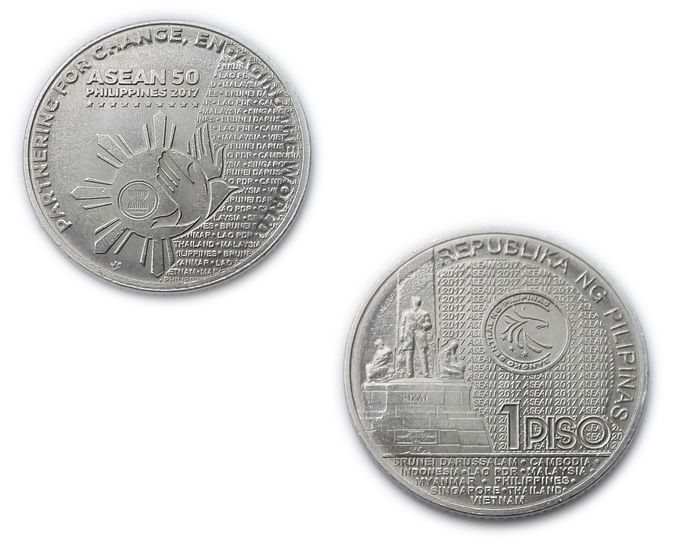
Commemorative one-peso coin celebrating the 50th ASEAN Summit.

In 1992, the coin was featured with a 50-year anniversary of the Battle of Bataan.

In December 2011, the Bangko Sentral ng Pilipinas (BSP) released a limited edition commemorative one-peso coin. minted as a tribute to the national hero Jose Rizal who celebrated his 150th birth anniversary last June 19, 2011.

In November 2017, the Bangko Sentral ng Pilipinas unveiled a commemorative one-peso coin design for the 50th anniversary of the ASEAN, in conjunction with the Philippines' hosting of the ASEAN Summit.
