= Philippine peso =

Currency of the Philippines

Piso ng Pilipinas (Filipino)
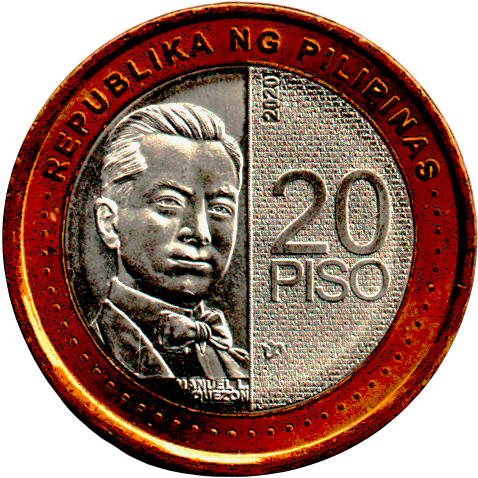
- NGC Series ₱20 (obverse)

ISO 4217
- Code: PHP (numeric: 608)
- Subunit: 0.01

Units of account
- Symbol: ₱
- Subunit
- 1/100: sentimo (or centavo)

Denominations
- Banknotes
- Freq. used: ₱50, ₱100, ₱500, ₱1000
- Rarely used: ₱20, ₱200
- Coins
- Freq. used: 25¢, ₱1, ₱5, ₱10, ₱20
- Rarely used: 1¢, 5¢, 10¢ (no longer minted)

Demographics
- User(s): Philippines

Issuance
- Central bank: Currency Reserve Fund of the Philippine Treasury (1918–1949); Bangko Sentral ng Pilipinas
- Website: www.bsp.gov.ph
- Printer: The Security Plant Complex
- Mint: The Security Plant Complex

Valuation
- Inflation: 6.2%
- Source: Philippine Statistics Authority, July 2026
- Method: CPI

The Philippine peso, also referred to by its Filipino name piso (from Spanish 'peso')(Philippine English: /ˈpɛsɔː/ PEH-saw, /ˈpiː-/ PEE-, plural pesos; Filipino: piso [ˈpisɔː, ˈpɪsɔː]; sign: ₱; code: PHP), is the official currency of the Philippines. It is subdivided into 100 sentimo, also called centavos.

The peso has the symbol "₱", introduced during American rule in place of the original peso sign "$" used throughout Spanish America. Alternative symbols used are "PHP", "PhP", "Php", or just "P".

The monetary policy of the Philippines is conducted by the Bangko Sentral ng Pilipinas (BSP), established on January 3, 1949, as its central bank. It produces the country's banknotes and coins at its Security Plant Complex, which is set to move to New Clark City in Capas, Tarlac.

== History ==
The Philippine peso is derived from the Spanish peso or pieces of eight brought over in large quantities from Spanish America by the Manila galleons of the period from the 16th century to the 19th. From the same Spanish peso or dollar is derived the various pesos of Spanish America, the dollars of the US and Hong Kong, as well as the Chinese yuan and the Japanese yen.

=== Pre-colonial coinage ===
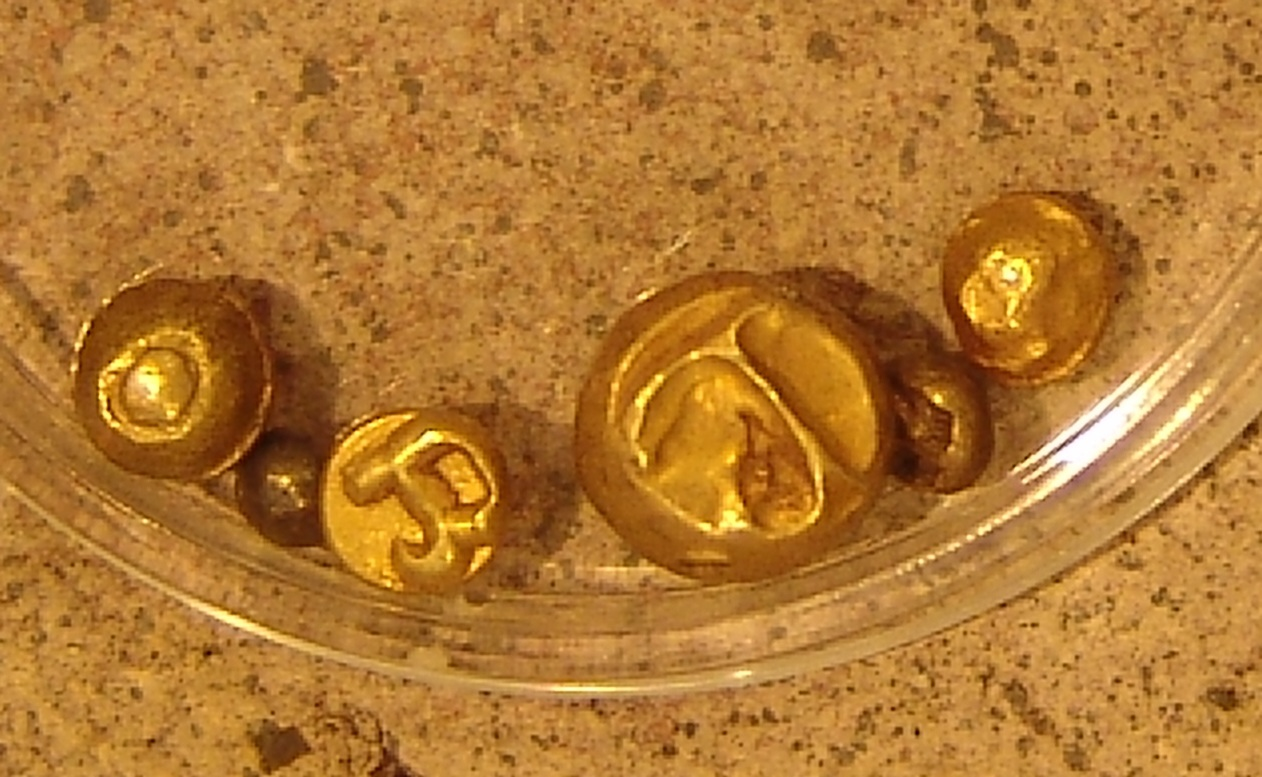
Piloncitos, a type of coin used by the pre-colonial peoples of the archipelago

Pre-colonial trade between tribes of what is now the Philippines and with traders from the neighboring islands was conducted through barter. The inconvenience of barter, however, later led to the use of some objects as a medium of exchange. Gold, which was plentiful in many parts of the islands, invariably found its way into these objects that included the Piloncitos, small bead-like gold bits considered by the local numismatists as the earliest coin of the ancient peoples of the Philippines, and gold barter rings. The original silver currency unit was the rupya or rupiah, brought over by trade with India and Indonesia.

Two native Tagalog words for money which survive today in Filipino were salapi and possibly pera. Salapi is thought to be from isa (one) + rupya which would become lapia when adapted to Tagalog. Alternately, it could be from Arabic asrafi (a gold coin, see Persian ashrafi) or sarf (money, money exchange). Pera is thought to be from Malay perak (silver), which also has a direct cognate or adaptation in Tagalog/Filipino as pilak. Alternately, it could be from 10 and 5 céntimo coins of the Spanish peseta, known as the perra gorda and perra chica.

=== Spanish colonial period ===
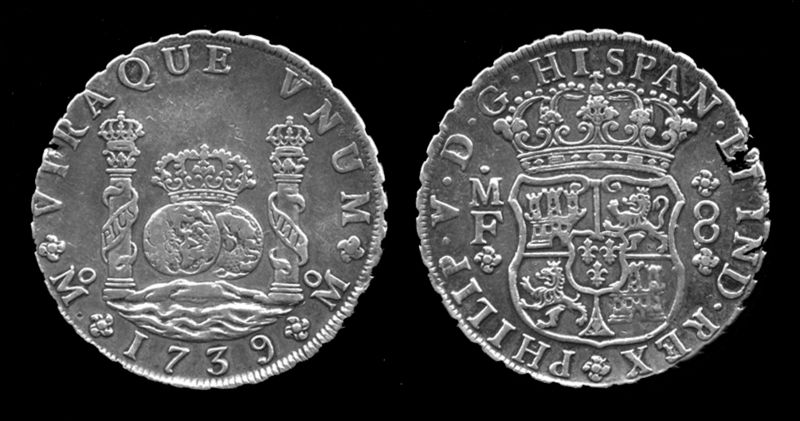
Silver columnario peso imported from Spanish America from 1726 to 1770

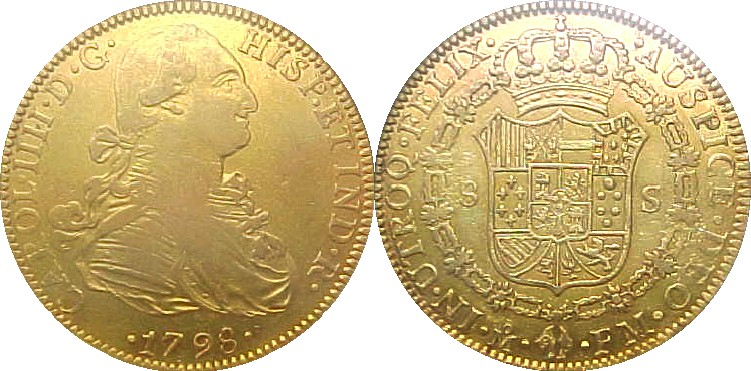
Spanish gold onza or 8 escudos coin imported from Spanish America and valued at 16 silver pesos

The Spanish dollar, or silver peso (worth eight reales), was first introduced by the expedition of 1521 and brought in large quantities after the 1565 conquest of the Philippines by Miguel López de Legazpi. The local salapi continued under Spanish rule as a toston or half-peso coin. Additionally, Spanish gold onzas or eight-escudo coins were also introduced with identical weight to the Spanish dollar but valued at 16 silver pesos.

The earliest silver coins brought in by the Manila galleons from Mexico and other Spanish American colonies were in the form of roughly-cut cobs or macuquinas. These coins usually bore a cross on one side and the Spanish royal coat-of-arms on the other. These crudely made coins were subsequently replaced by machine-minted coins called Columnarios (pillar dollars) or "dos mundos (two worlds)" in 1732 containing 27.07 grams of 0.917 fine silver (revised to 0.903 fine in 1771).

Fractional currency was supplied by cutting the Spanish dollar coin, most commonly into eight wedges each worth one Spanish real. Locally produced crude copper or bronze coins called cuartos or barrillas (hence the Tagalog/Filipino words cuarta or kwarta, "money" and barya "coin" or "loose change") were also struck in the Philippines by order of the Spanish government, with 20 cuartos being equal to one real (hence, 160 cuartos to a peso). The absence of officially minted cuartos in the 19th century was alleviated in part by counterfeit two-cuarto coins made by Igorot copper miners in the Cordilleras.

A currency system derived from coins imported from Spain, China and neighboring countries was fraught with various difficulties. Money came in different coinages, and fractional currency in addition to the real and the cuarto also existed. Money has nearly always been scarce in Manila, and when it was abundant it was shipped to the provinces or exported abroad to pay for exports. An 1857 decree requiring the keeping of accounts in pesos and céntimos (worth 1/100of a peso) was of little help to the situation given the existence of copper cuartos worth 1/160 of a peso.

=== 19th century Gold/Silver Bimetallic standard ===
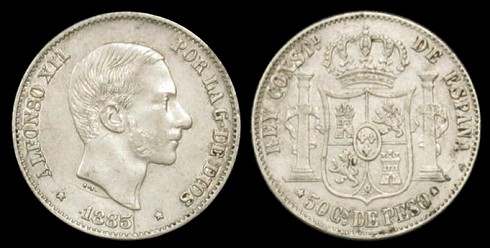
Silver 50-céntimo coin issued from 1864 until the 1890s

The Spanish gold onza (or 8-escudo coin) was of identical weight to the Spanish dollar but was officially valued at 16 silver pesos, thus putting the peso on a bimetallic standard, worth either the silver Mexican peso (27.07 g 0.903 fine, or 0.786 troy ounce XAG) or 1/16 the gold onza (1.6915 g 0.875 fine, or 0.0476 troy ounce XAU), with a gold–silver ratio of 16. Its divergence with the value of gold in international trade featured prominently in the continued monetary crises of the 19th century. In the 1850s the low price of gold in the international markets triggered the outflow of silver coins. In 1875 the adoption of the gold standard in Europe triggered a rise in the international price of gold and the replacement of gold coins with silver Mexican pesos.

As the price of silver fell further, Mexican peso imports were forbidden from 1877, and only Mexican pesos dated 1877 or earlier were legally equivalent to Philippine-minted pesos and peso fuerte banknotes. However, Spain and its colonies failed to establish a proper gold standard. The Philippine peso and the Spanish duro (Spain's "peso" or five-peseta coin) thus went on a fiduciary coin (or fiat coin) standard; while worth more than the Mexican peso due to its scarcity in circulation, both coins traded at a fluctuating discount versus the gold peso. While pre-1877 Mexican pesos were reminted into Philippine 10-, 20- and 50-céntimo coins until the 1890s, these coins were continuously smuggled in connivance with Customs officials due to their higher fiat value in the Philippines.

After 1898 the United States colonial administration repealed this "fictitious gold standard" in favor of the unlimited importation of Mexican pesos, and the Philippine peso became a silver standard currency with its value dropping to half a gold peso.

Concurrent with these events is the establishment of the Casa de Moneda de Manila in the Philippines in 1857, the mintage starting 1861 of gold 1, 2 and 4 peso coins according to Spanish standards (the 4-peso coin being 6.766 grams of 0.875 gold), and the mintage starting 1864 of fractional 50-, 20- and 10-céntimo silver coins also according to Spanish standards (with 100 céntimos containing 25.96 grams of 0.900 silver; later lowered to 0.835 silver in 1881).

In 1897 Spain introduced 1-peso silver coins with the bust of King Alfonso XIII, as well as 5- and 10-céntimo de peseta coins for circulation in the Philippines as 1- and 2-céntimo de peso coins. The Spanish-Filipino peso remained in circulation and were legal tender in the islands until 1904, when the American authorities demonetized them in favor of the new US-Philippine peso.

The first paper money circulated in the Philippines was the Philippine peso fuerte issued in 1851 by the country's first bank, the El Banco Español Filipino de Isabel II. Convertible to either silver pesos or gold onzas, its volume of 1,800,000 pesos was small relative to about 40,000,000 silver pesos in circulation at the end of the 19th century.

A fanciful etymology for the term pera holds that it was inspired by the Carlist Wars where Queen Isabel II was supposedly called La Perra (The Bitch) by her detractors, and thus coins bearing the image of Isabel II were supposedly called perras, which became pera. A less outlandish Spanish origin, if the term is indeed derived from Spanish, could be the Spanish coins of 10 and 5 céntimos de peseta (valued locally at 2 and 1 céntimos de peso) which were nicknamed perra gorda and perra chica, where the "bitch" or female dog is a sarcastic reference to the Spanish lion. Arguments against either theory are that the coins bearing the face of Isabel II were nicknamed Isabelinas and that the perra coins were only introduced to the Philippines in 1897.

=== Revolutionary Period ===
Asserting its independence after the Philippine Declaration of Independence on June 12, 1898, the República Filipina (Philippine Republic) under General Emilio Aguinaldo issued its own coins and paper currency backed by the country's natural resources. The coins were the first to use the name centavo instead of céntimo for the subdivision of the peso. The island of Panay also issued revolutionary coinage. After Aguinaldo's capture by American forces in Palanan, Isabela on March 23, 1901, the revolutionary peso ceased to exist.

=== American Colonial Period ===
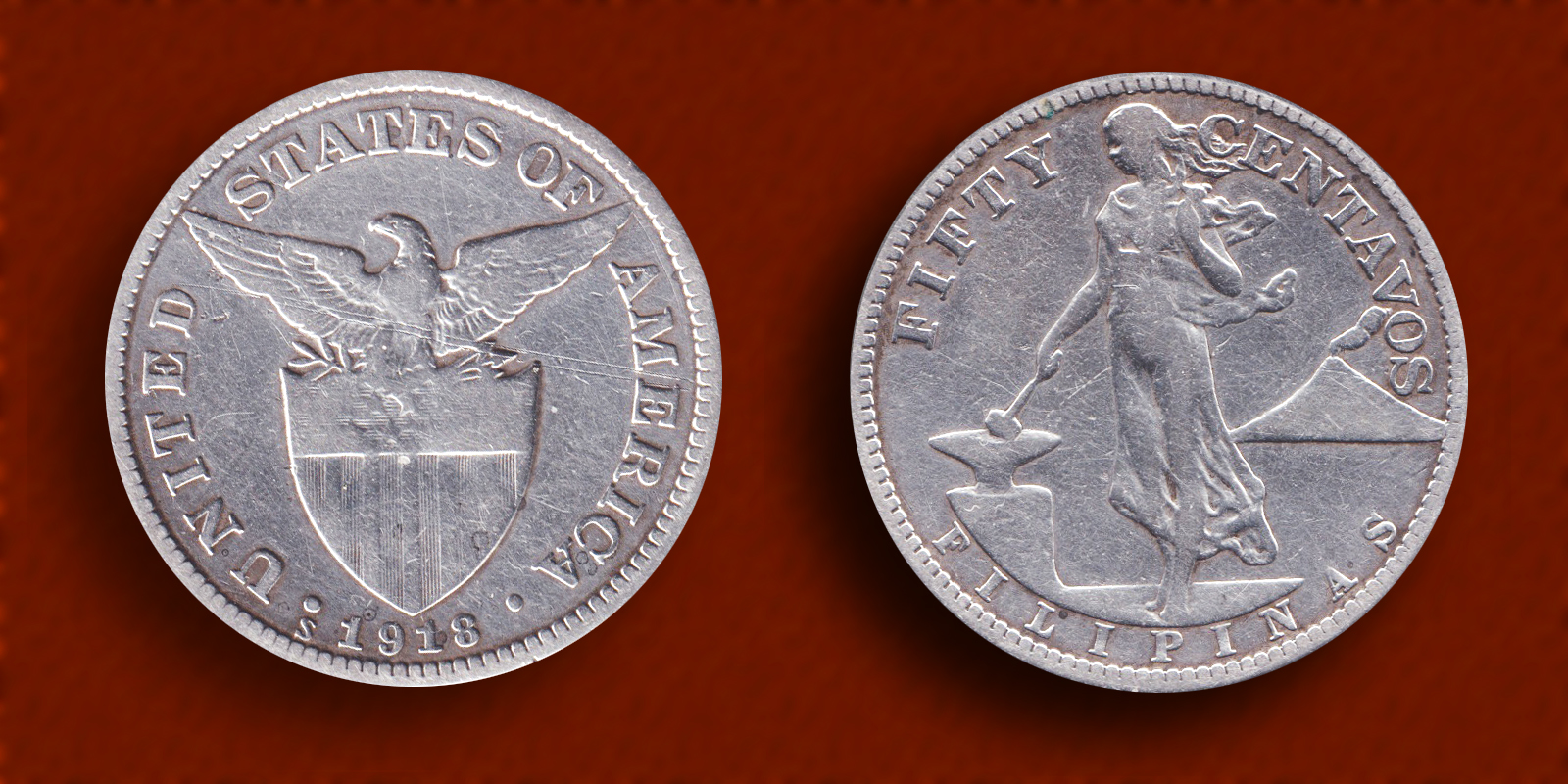
United States Administration 50 centavos silver coin minted in San Francisco in 1918.

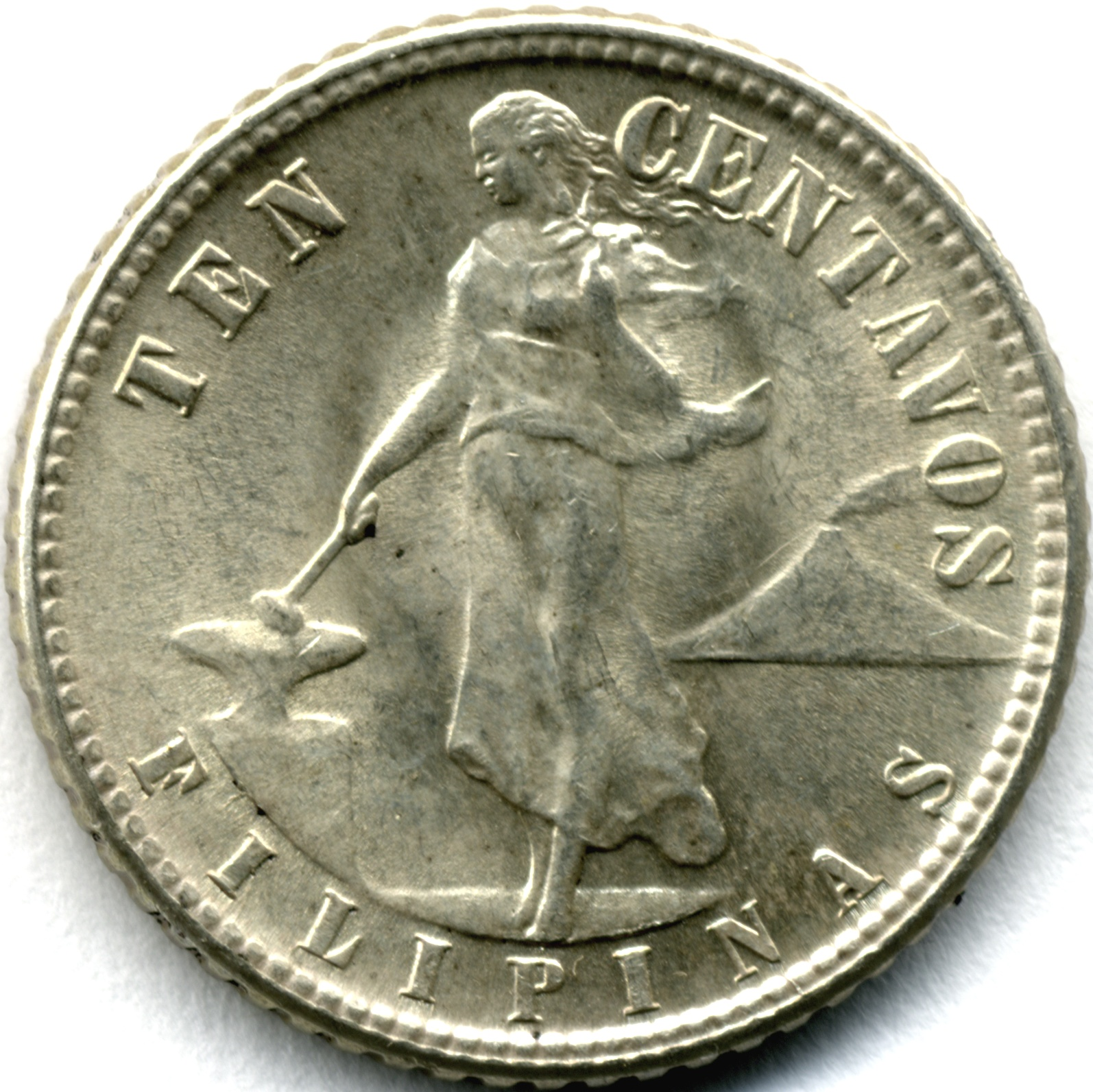
ten-centavo coin issued 1907–1945.

After the United States took control of the Philippines, the United States Congress passed the Philippine Coinage Act of 1903, established the unit of currency to be a theoretical gold peso (not coined) consisting of 12.9 grains of gold 0.900 fine (0.0241875 XAU). This unit was equivalent to exactly half the value of a U.S. dollar. Its peg to gold was maintained until the gold content of the U.S. dollar was reduced in 1934. Its peg of ₱2 to the U.S. dollar was maintained until independence in 1946.

The act provided for the coinage and issuance of Philippine silver pesos substantially of the weight and fineness as the Mexican peso, which should be of the value of 50 cents gold and redeemable in gold at the insular treasury, and which was intended to be the sole circulating medium among the people. The act also provided for the coinage of subsidiary and minor coins and for the issuance of silver certificates in denominations of not less than 2 nor more than 10 pesos (maximum denomination increased to 500 pesos from 1905).

It also provided for the creation of a gold-standard fund to maintain the parity of the coins so authorized to be issued and authorized the insular government to issue temporary certificates of indebtedness bearing interest at a rate not to exceed 4 percent per annum, payable not more than one year from date of issue, to an amount which should not at any one time exceed 10 million dollars or 20 million pesos.

The US territorial administration also issued Culion leper colony coinage between 1913 and 1930.

=== Commonwealth Period ===
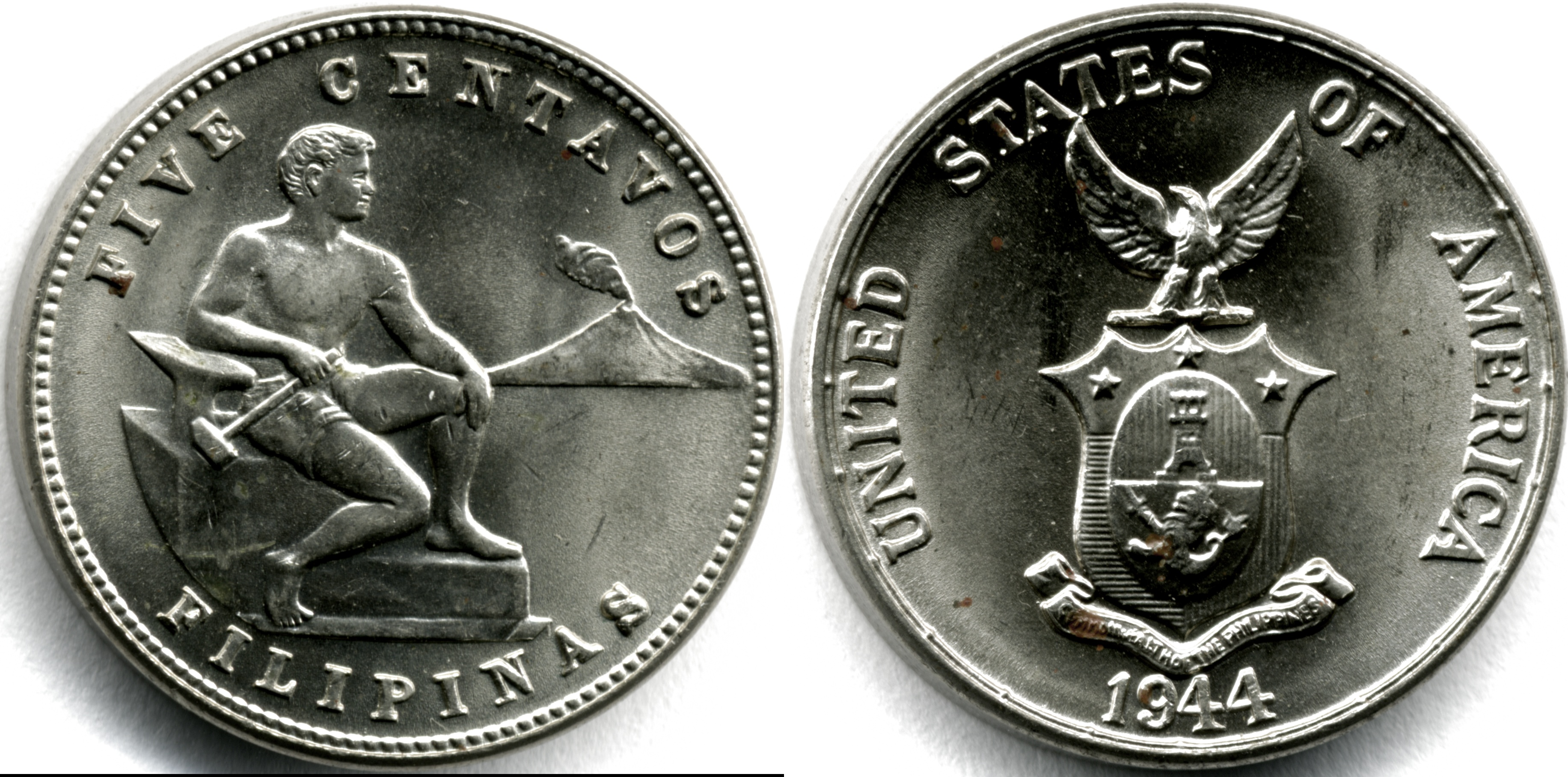
1944 Philippines five-centavo coin of the Commonwealth period.

When the Philippines became a U.S. Commonwealth in 1935, the coat of arms of the Philippine Commonwealth was adopted and replaced the arms of the U.S. Territories on the reverse of coins while the obverse remained unchanged. This seal is composed of a much smaller eagle with its wings pointed up, perched over a shield with peaked corners, above a scroll reading "Commonwealth of the Philippines". It is a much busier pattern, and widely considered less attractive.

=== World War II ===
In 1942, at the height of the resistance against the Japanese invasion in Corregidor island, US-Philippine forces managed to ship off to Australia most of the gold and significant assets held in reserve by Manila's banks, but they had to discard an estimated ₱ 15 million worth of silver pesos into the sea off Caballo Bay rather than surrender it to the Japanese. After the war these assets would be returned to Philippine banks, and most of the discarded pesos would be recovered but in badly corroded condition.

The Japanese occupiers of the Philippines then introduced fiat notes for use in the country. Emergency circulating notes (also termed "guerrilla pesos") were also issued by banks and local governments, using crude inks and materials, which were redeemable in silver pesos after the end of the war. The puppet state under José P. Laurel outlawed possession of guerrilla currency and declared a monopoly on the issuance of money and anyone found to possess guerrilla notes could be arrested or even executed. Because of the fiat nature of the currency, the Philippine economy felt the effects of hyperinflation.

Combined U.S. and Philippine Commonwealth military forces including recognized guerrilla units continued printing Philippine pesos, so that, from October 1944 to September 1945, all earlier issues except for the emergency guerrilla notes were considered illegal and were no longer legal tender.

=== Independence and the Central Bank of the Philippines, 1949–1993 ===
Republic Act No. 265 created the Central Bank of the Philippines (now the Bangko Sentral ng Pilipinas) on January 3, 1949, in which was vested the power of administering the banking and credit system of the country. Under the act, all powers in the printing and mintage of Philippine currency were vested in the CBP, taking away the rights of the banks such as Bank of the Philippine Islands and the Philippine National Bank to issue currency.

The Philippines faced various post-war problems due to the slow recovery of agricultural production, trade deficits due to the need to import needed goods, and high inflation due to the lack of goods. The CBP embarked on a fixed exchange system during the 1950s in which the peso's official exchange rate was maintained at ₱2 per U.S. dollar by various measures to control and conserve the country's international reserves.

This system, combined with other "Filipino First" efforts to curtail importations, helped reshape the country's import patterns and improve the balance of payments. Such restrictions, however, gave rise to a black market in which dollars routinely traded at above ₱3 per dollar. The CBP's allocation system which rationed a limited supply of dollars at ₱2 per dollar to purchase priority imports was exploited by parties with political connections. Higher black market exchange rates drove remittances and foreign investments away from official channels.

By 1962, the task of maintaining the old ₱2 per dollar parity while defending available reserves had become untenable under the new Diosdado Macapagal administration, opening up a new decontrol era from 1962 to 1970 in which foreign exchange restrictions were dismantled and a new free-market exchange rate of ₱3.90 per dollar was adopted from 1965. This move helped balance foreign exchange supply versus demand and greatly boosted foreign investment inflows and international reserves. However, a weak manufacturing base that could not capture market share in (mostly imported) consumer goods meant that devaluation only fueled inflation, and by the time the decontrol era ended in 1970 another devaluation to ₱6.43 per dollar was needed.

In 1967, coinage adopted Filipino language terminology instead of English, banknotes following suit in 1969. Thus the currency names appearing on coinage and banknotes changed from the English centavo and peso to the Filipino sentimo and piso. However, centavo is more commonly used by Filipinos in everyday speech.

The CBP's final era from 1970 until the BSP's reestablishment in 1993 involved a "managed float system" with no more fixed parity commitments versus the dollar. The CBP only committed to maintain orderly foreign exchange market conditions and to reduce short-term volatility. Difficulties continued throughout the 1970s and 1980s in managing inflation and keeping exchange rates stable, and this was complicated further by the CBP lacking independence in government, especially when the latter incurred fiscal shortfalls. The worst episode occurred when a confidence crisis in the Ferdinand Marcos administration triggered a capital flight among investors between August 1983 and February 1986, nearly doubling the exchange rate from ₱11 to ₱20 per dollar and also doubling the prices of goods.

=== Reorganization to the new Bangko Sentral ng Pilipinas ===
Positive political and economic developments in the 1990s paved the way for further economic liberalization and an opportunity to unburden the central bank of objectives that are inconsistent with keeping inflation stable. The New Central Bank Act (Republic Act No 7653) of June 14, 1993 replaces the old CBP with a new Bangko Sentral ng Pilipinas mandated explicitly to maintain price stability, and enjoying fiscal and administrative autonomy to insulate it from government interference. This, along with the further liberalization of various foreign exchange regulations, puts the Philippine peso on a fully floating exchange rate system. The market decides on the level in which the peso trades versus foreign currencies based on the BSP's ability to maintain a stable inflation rate on goods and services as well as sufficient international reserves to fund exports. Black market exchange rates as seen in the past are now nonexistent since official markets now reflect underlying supply and demand.

The Philippine peso has since traded versus the U.S. dollar in a range of ₱24–46 from 1993 to 1999, ₱40–56 from 2000 to 2009, and ₱40–54 from 2010 to 2019. The previous 1903–1934 definition of a peso as 12.9 grains of 0.9 gold (or 0.0241875 XAU) is now worth ₱4,206.088 based on gold prices as of April 2025.

== Names for different denominations ==
The smallest currency unit is called centavo in English (from Spanish centavo). Following the adoption of the "Pilipino series" in 1967, it became officially known as sentimo in Filipino (from Spanish céntimo). However, "centavo" and its local spellings, síntabo and sentabo, are still used as synonyms in Tagalog. It is the most widespread preferred term over sentimo in other Philippine languages, including Abaknon, Bikol, Cebuano, Cuyonon, Ilocano, and Waray, In Chavacano, centavos are referred to as céns (also spelled séns).

Tagalog language words for the different centavo-denominated coins were more common in the 20th century before the decrease in their use afterwards.

- The half-centavo coin was called a kusing, and the 1-centavo coin was called isang pera or sampera.
- Coins for 5, 10, 25 and 50 centavos went by their Spanish names singko, diyes, bentesingko and singkwenta. Additionally, the 50-centavo coin was also called salapi.
- The terms "1 peso each", "50 centavos each" and "1 centavo each" may be expressed as mamiso, manalapi and mamera, respectively.

== Coins ==
The Spanish administration opened the Casa de Moneda de Manila (or Manila mint) in 1857 in order to supply coins for the Philippines, minting silver coins of 10 céntimos, 20 céntimos, and 50 céntimos; and gold coins of 1 peso, 2 pesos and 4 pesos.

The American government minted currency under the Philippine Coinage Act of 1903 in its mints in the United States, in base-metal denominations of half centavo, one centavo and five centavos; and in silver denominations of 10 centavos, 20 centavos, 50 centavos and 1 peso. They eventually deemed it more economical and convenient to mint coins in the Philippines, hence the re-opening of the Manila Mint in 1920, which produced coins until the Commonwealth Era excluding 1/2 centavo and regular-issue 1-peso coins (commemorative 1-peso coins were minted in 1936).

In 1937, the eagle-and-shield reverse design was changed into the coat-of-arms of the Commonwealth of the Philippines while retaining the legend "United States of America". During the Second World War, no coins were minted from 1942 to 1943 due to the Japanese Occupation. Minting resumed in 1944–45 for the last time under the Commonwealth. Coins only resumed in 1958 after an issuance of centavo-denominated fractional banknotes from 1949 to 1957.

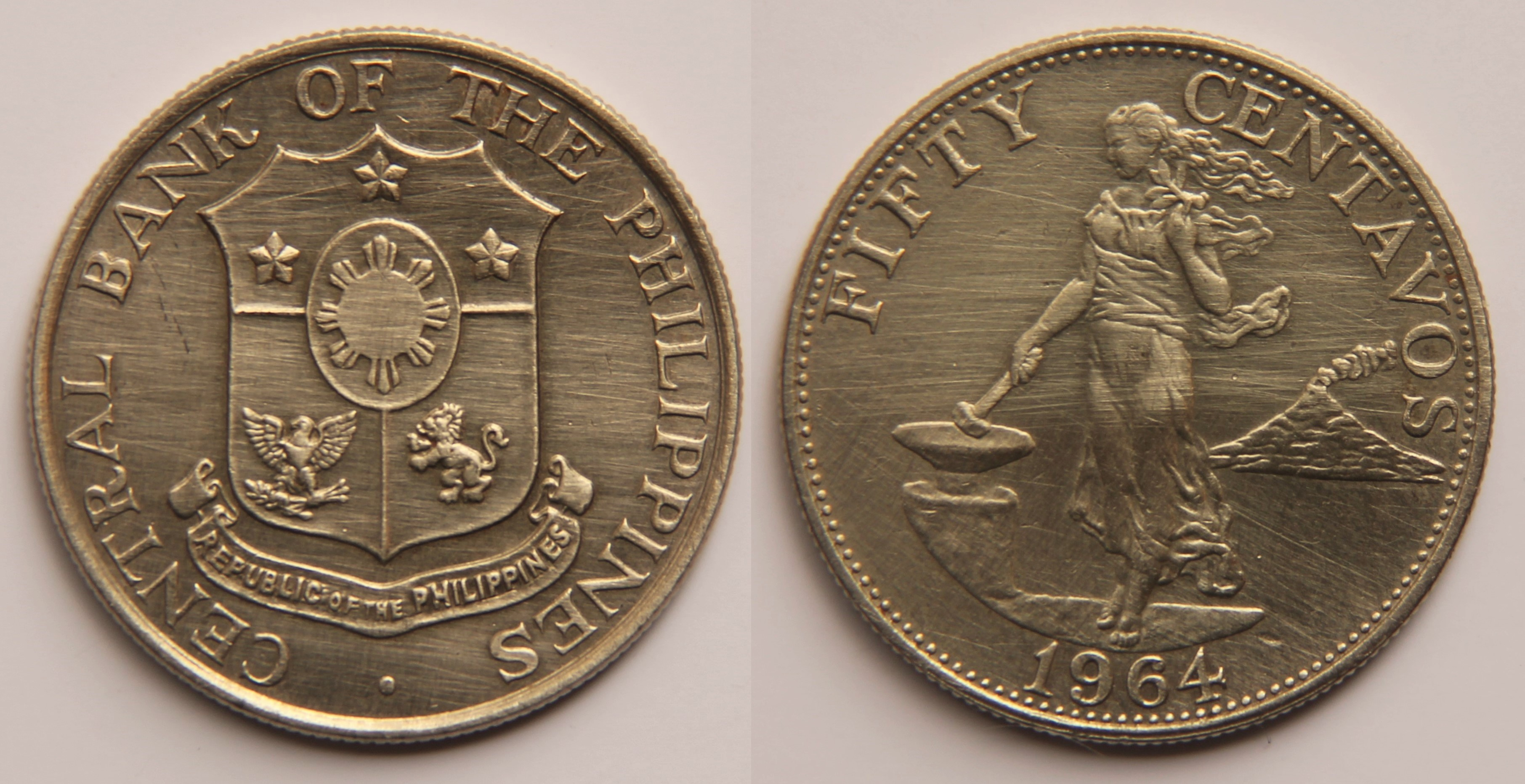
50-centavo coin, English series (1964)

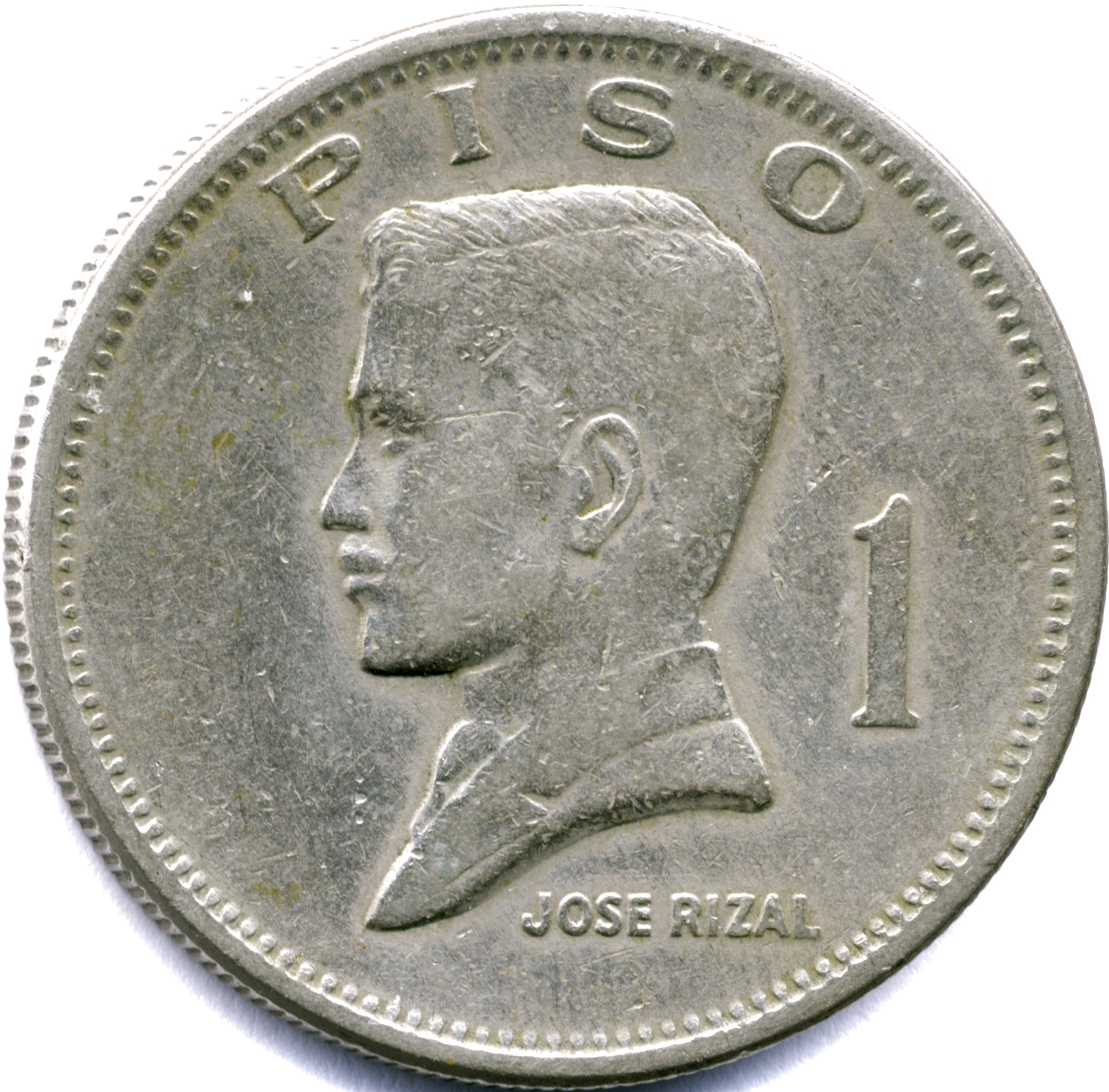
1-piso coin, Pilipino series, 1972–1974

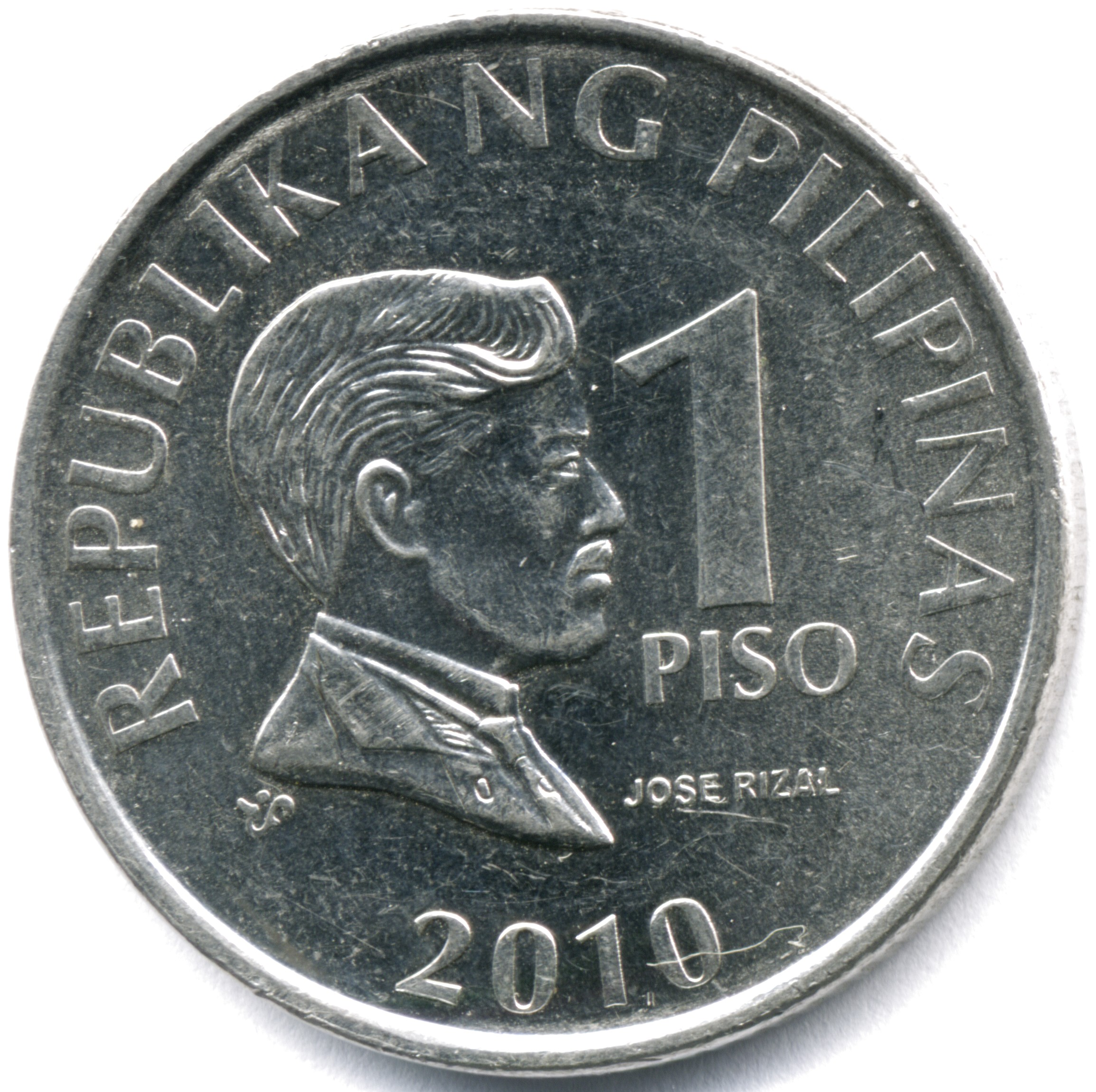
The one-peso coin of the BSP series

In 1958, the new English coinage series entirely of base metal was introduced, consisting of bronze 1 centavo, brass 5 centavos and nickel-brass 10 centavos, 25 centavos and 50 centavos. The 20-centavo denomination was discontinued.

In 1967, the Pilipino-language coin series was introduced with the peso and centavo renamed into piso and sentimo. It consisted of aluminum 1-sentimo, brass 5-sentimo, and nickel-brass 10, 25 and 50 sentimo. The 1-piso coin was reintroduced in 1972.

In 1975, the Ang Bagong Lipunan Series was introduced. It consisted of aluminum 1-sentimo, brass 5-sentimo, cupro-nickel 10-sentimo, 25-sentimo and 1-piso, and a pure nickel 5-piso coin which rarely circulated.

In 1983, the Flora and Fauna Series was introduced. It consisted of aluminum 1, 5 and 10-sentimo, brass 25-sentimo, and cupro-nickel 50-sentimo, 1-piso and a new 2-piso coin. From 1991 to 1994 the sizes of coins from 25-sentimo to 2-piso were reduced under the Improved Flora and Fauna Series, and a new nickel-brass 5-piso coin was introduced.

In 1995, the New Design coin series was introduced with the aim of replacing and demonetizing all previously issued coin series on January 3, 1998. It initially consisted of copper-plated steel 1, 5 and 10-sentimo, brass 25-sentimo, copper-nickel 1-piso and nickel-brass 5-piso. In 2000, the bimetallic 10-piso coin was added to the series. In 2003, the composition of the 25-sentimo and 1-piso was changed to brass-plated steel and nickel-plated steel, respectively.

The current series, the New Generation Currency Series was introduced in November 30, 2017, consisting of nickel-plated steel 1, 5, 25 sentimo and 1, 5 and 10-piso. In December 2019, the bimetallic plated-steel 20-piso coin was introduced, together with a modified nine-sided 5-piso coin issued in response to numerous complaints that the round steel 5-piso coin looked too much like the 1-piso and 10-piso.

Denominations worth P0.25 (~$0.005) and below are still issued but have been increasingly regarded as a nuisance. Proposals to retire and demonetize all coins less than one peso in value have been rejected by the government and the BSP.

New Generation Currency series (2017–2019)
Image		Value	Technical parameters				Description			Issued from
Obverse	Reverse	Value	Diameter (mm)	Thickness (mm)	Mass (g)	Composition	Edge	Obverse	Reverse	Issued from
		1¢	15.00	1.54	1.90	Nickel-plated steel	Smooth	Three stars and sun; value; year of minting; lettering: REPUBLIKA NG PILIPINAS	Xanthostemon verdugonianus (Mangkono); BSP logo	November 30, 2017
		5¢	16.00	1.60	2.20	Nickel-plated steel	Reeded	Three stars and sun; value; year of minting; lettering: REPUBLIKA NG PILIPINAS	Hoya pubicalyx (Kapal-kapal Baging); BSP logo	November 30, 2017
		25¢	20.00	1.65	3.60	Nickel-plated steel	Smooth	Three stars and sun; value; year of minting; lettering: REPUBLIKA NG PILIPINAS	Dillenia philippinensis (Katmon); BSP logo	November 30, 2017
		₱1	23.00	2.05	6.00	Nickel-plated steel	Interrupted reeding	José Rizal; value; year of minting; lettering: REPUBLIKA NG PILIPINAS	Vanda sanderiana (Waling-waling); BSP logo	March 26, 2018
		₱5	25.00	2.20	7.40	Nickel-plated steel	Smooth	Andrés Bonifacio; value; year of minting; lettering: REPULBIKA NG PILIPINAS	Strongylodon macrobotrys (Tayabak); BSP logo; microlettering: BANGKO SENTRAL NG PILIPINAS	November 30, 2017
		₱5	25.00 (nonagonal)	2.20	7.40	Nickel-plated steel	Smooth	Andrés Bonifacio; value; year of minting; lettering: REPULBIKA NG PILIPINAS	Strongylodon macrobotrys (Tayabak); BSP logo; microlettering: BANGKO SENTRAL NG PILIPINAS	December 17, 2019
		₱10	27.00	2.05	8.00	Nickel-plated steel	Reeded lettering: BANGKO SENTRAL NG PILIPINAS	Apolinario Mabini; value; year of minting; lettering: REPUBLIKA NG PILIPINAS	Medinilla magnifica (Kapa-kapa); BSP logo; microlettering: BANGKO SENTRAL NG PILIPINAS	November 30, 2017
		₱20	30.00	2.10	11.50	Outer: Bronze-plated steel	Lettering: BSP ԀSꓭ BSP; ԀSꓭ BSP ԀSꓭ	Manuel Quezon; value; year of minting; lettering: REPUBLIKA NG PILIPINAS	Scyphiphora hydrophylacea (Nilad); BSP logo; Malacañang Palace; microlettering: BANGKO SENTRAL NG PILIPINAS	December 17, 2019
		₱20	30.00	2.10	11.50	Inner: Nickel-plated steel	Lettering: BSP ԀSꓭ BSP; ԀSꓭ BSP ԀSꓭ	Manuel Quezon; value; year of minting; lettering: REPUBLIKA NG PILIPINAS	Scyphiphora hydrophylacea (Nilad); BSP logo; Malacañang Palace; microlettering: BANGKO SENTRAL NG PILIPINAS	December 17, 2019
For table standards, see the coin specification table.

== Banknotes ==
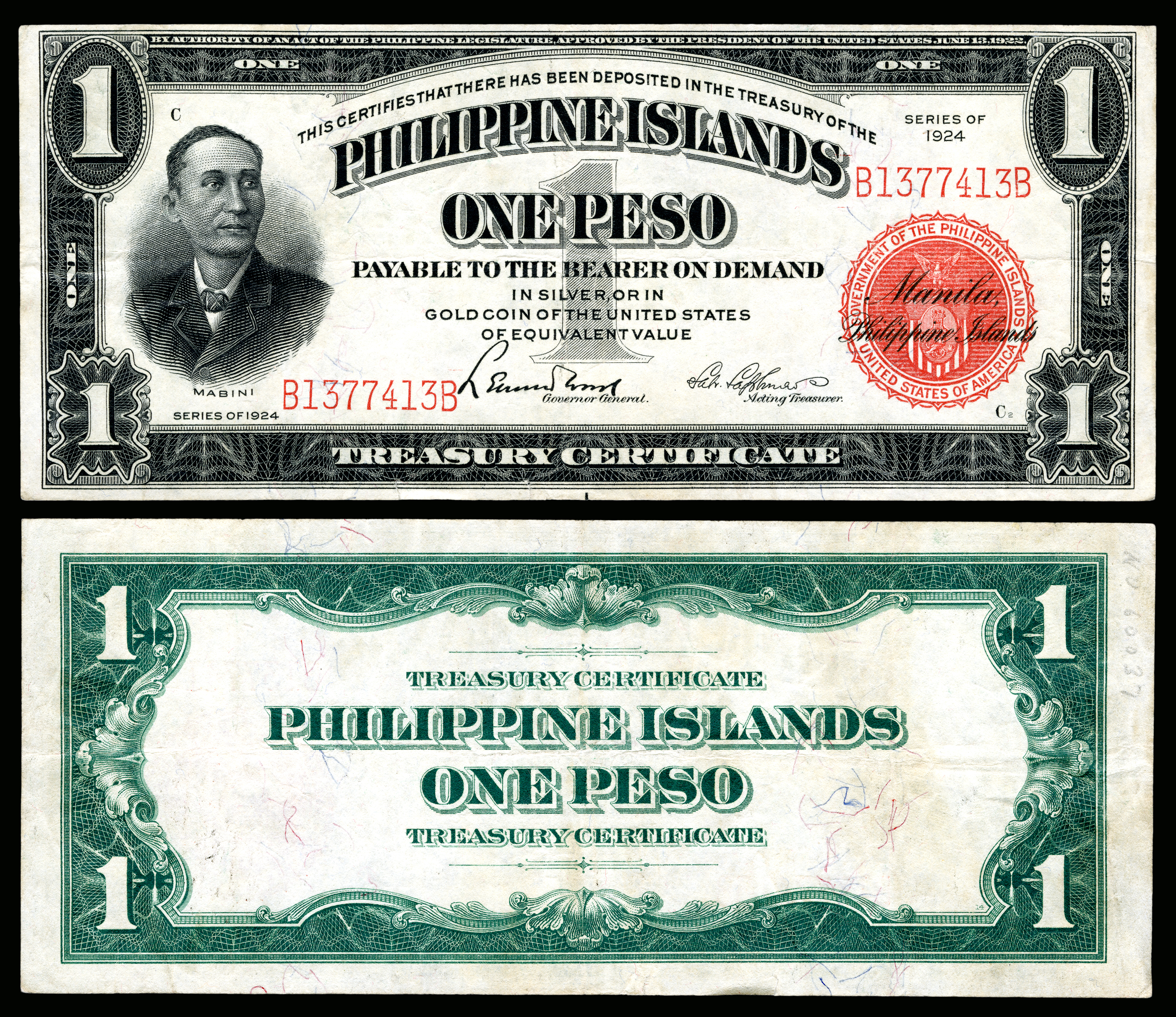
One-peso Treasury Certificate, 1924

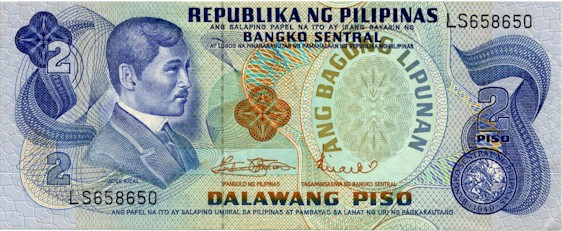
Two-peso note, Ang Bagong Lipunan series

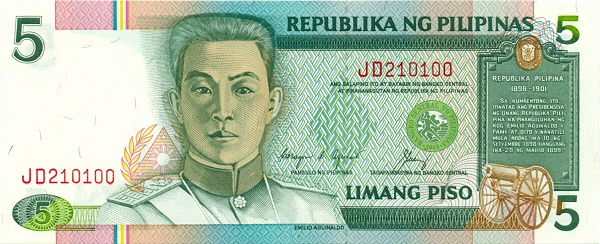
Five-peso note, New Design Series

=== Previous series ===
In 1852, the Philippines first issued banknotes under El Banco Español Filipino de Isabel II (the present Bank of the Philippine Islands) in denominations of 10, 25, 50 and 200 pesos fuertes (strong pesos).

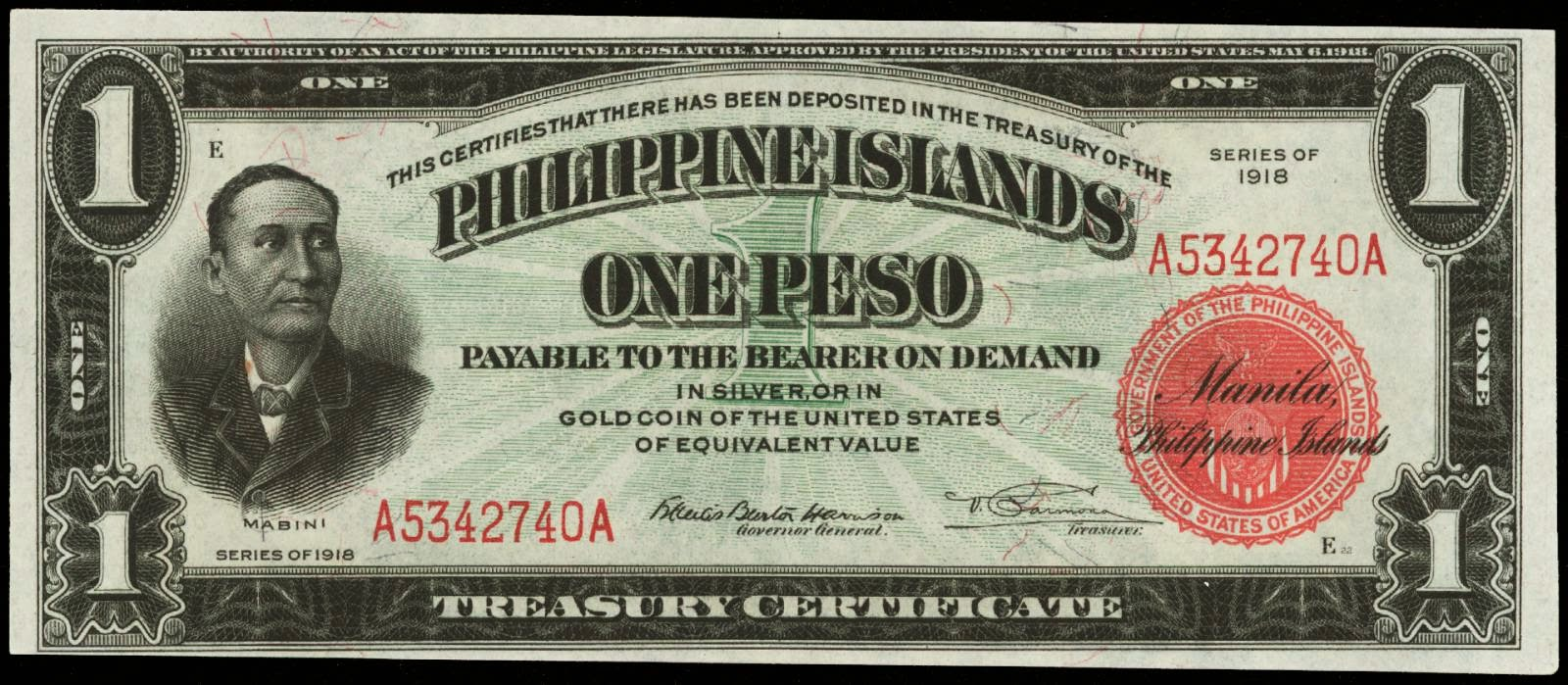
A 1-peso note from the Treasury Certificate Series, which was introduced in 1918.

By 1903, the American colonial Insular Government issued Silver Certificates in denominations of 1, 2, 5, 10, 20, 50, 100 and 500 pesos, backed by silver coin or U.S. gold at a fixed rate of 2:1. These were supplemented by banknotes of the Bank of the Philippine Islands in 1908, banknotes of the Philippine National Bank in 1916, and Treasury Certificates of the Philippine Treasury in 1918 backed by United States Government bonds. Only the latter remained legal tender after Philippine independence in 1946.

The dimensions of all banknotes issued under the US-Philippine administration, 16 x 6.6 cm, has been used ever since on all Philippine banknotes (except pre-1958 centavo notes), and was introduced during William Howard Taft's tenure as governor-general of the Philippines. In view of its highly successful run, President Taft then appointed a committee that reported favorably on the advantages and savings from changing the size of United States banknotes to Philippine-size. Since 1928 the sizes of the U.S. dollar Federal Reserve Notes and Philippine banknotes have therefore been nearly identical.

In 1949, the Central Bank of the Philippines took over paper money issue. Its first notes were Treasury Certificates printed under US administration overprinted with "Victory - Central Bank of the Philippines". These were followed in 1951 by regular-issue English Series banknotes in denominations of 5, 10, 20 and 50 centavos, 1 peso, 2 pesos, 5 pesos, 10 pesos, 20 pesos, 50 pesos, 100 pesos, 200 pesos and 500 pesos. The centavo notes (except for the 50-centavo note, which would be later known as the half-peso note) were discontinued in 1958 when the English Series coins were first minted.

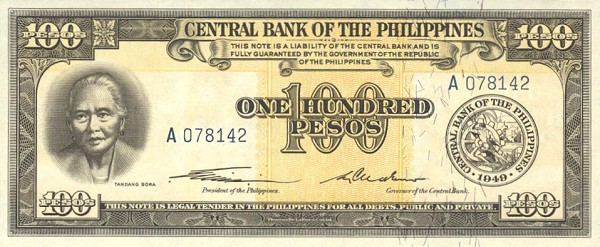
A 100-peso note from the English Series, which was introduced in 1951.

In 1967, the CBP adopted the Filipino language on its Pilipino Banknote Series, using the name Bangko Sentral ng Pilipinas, and in 1969 introduced the Pilipino Series of notes in denominations of 1, 5, 10, 20, 50 and 100 piso. The Ang Bagong Lipunan Series was introduced in 1973 and included 2-piso notes.

A radical change occurred in 1985, when the CBP issued the New Design Series with 500-piso notes introduced in 1987, 1000-piso notes (for the first time) in 1991 and later after the CBP was re-established as BSP, 200-piso notes were released in 2002.

The New Design Series was the name used to refer to Philippine banknotes issued from 1985 to 1993. It was then renamed as the BSP Series due to the re-establishment of the Bangko Sentral ng Pilipinas in 1993. It was succeeded by the New Generation Currency Series conceptualized from 2007 to 2010 and issued since printing its first batch on November 2010.

The New Design/BSP Series banknotes were printed until 2013 (with 5-peso note were printed until June 1995, 10-peso note until July 2001, 20 and 1000 peso notes until 2012, and 50, 100, 200 and 500 peso notes until 2013), legal tender until December 31, 2015, and can be exchanged with newer notes until the main banknotes' demonetization on January 3, 2018. The NDS co-existed with NGC banknotes throughout the 2010s decade from November 2010, to August 2, 2019. The main banknotes were no longer legal tender since January 1, 2016 and they were demonetized two years later on January 3, 2018, and the series overall on August 2, 2019 with the 2,000 and 100,000 peso commemorative banknotes, making the NDS/BSP series the longest banknote series to have a liability of the BSP at 34 years.

=== New Generation Currency series ===
Bangko Sentral ng Pilipinas (BSP) began the 12-year demonetization process of the New Design Series when the New Generation Currency (NGC) project was started in 2007 through formal conceptualization process which was a result of the meeting of the minds of people with diverse backgrounds and ideas: central bankers, artists, technocrats, historians, communication experts, and currency printers to further enhance security features and to improve durability. It is where the thematic content, designs, and security features underwent thorough deliberations and evaluation, and was undertaken by the BSP’s Numismatic Committee (Num Com) in consultation with the Monetary Board (MB) and, subsequently, with the approval of the BSP Governor and the President of the Philippines.

The members of the numismatic committee included Bangko Sentral Deputy Governor Diwa Guinigundo and Dr. Ambeth Ocampo, chairman of the National Historical Institute. Designed by Studio 5 Designs and Design Systemat, the new banknotes' designs features famous Filipinos and iconic natural wonders. Philippine national symbols will be depicted on coins. Print run for the series began on November 2010 and banknotes printed within that batch were released to the public on December 16, 2010 three years after the project and process for NDS demonetization were started. The word used in the bills was "Pilipino" rendered in Baybayin (ᜉᜒᜎᜒᜉᜒᜈᜓ). The font used for lettering in the banknotes is Myriad, while the numerals are set in the Twentieth Century font. The series was approved by Presidents Gloria Macapagal Arroyo and her immediate successor Benigno Aquino III, making the only banknote series to be approved by two presidents.

Several, albeit disputable, errors have been discovered on banknotes of the New Generation series and discussed in social media. Among these are the exclusion of Batanes from the Philippine map on the reverse of all denominations, the mislocation of the Puerto Princesa Subterranean Underground River on the reverse of the 500-peso note and the Tubbataha Reef on the 1000-peso note, and the incorrect coloring on the beak and feathers of the blue-naped parrot on the 500-peso, but these were eventually realized to be due to the color limitations of intaglio printing. The scientific names of the animals featured on the reverse sides of all banknotes were incorrectly rendered in the 2010 series, but were corrected starting 2017.

By February 2016, the BSP started to circulate new 100-peso notes which were modified to have a stronger mauve or violet color. This was "in response to suggestions from the public to make it easier to distinguish from the 1000-peso bank note". The public can still use the New Generation Currency 100-peso notes with fainter colors as they are still acceptable.

In 2019, Bangko Sentral ng Pilipinas (BSP) introduced a 20-piso coin that will eventually replace the 20-piso note. The latter remained in production until its printing materials were used up; it will remain legal tender, disappearing gradually as individual notes become unfit for circulation.

New Generation Currency series (2010; 2020) Designers: Studio 5 Designs and Design Systemat
Image		Value	Dimensions (mm)	Main color	Description		Issue
Obverse	Reverse	Value	Dimensions (mm)	Main color	Obverse	Reverse	Issue
		₱20	160 × 66	Orange	Manuel L. Quezon; Filipino declared as national language; Malacañang Palace	Rice Terraces, Banaue; Paradoxurus hermaphroditus; Cordilleras weave design	November 2010
		₱50	160 × 66	Red	Sergio Osmeña; First Philippine Assembly; Leyte Landing	Taal Lake, Batangas; Caranx ignobilis; Batangas embroidery design	November 2010
		₱50	160 × 66	Red	Sergio Osmeña; First Philippine Assembly; Leyte Landing	Taal Lake, Batangas; Caranx ignobilis; Batangas embroidery design	July 29, 2020
		₱100	160 × 66	Violet	Manuel Roxas; Old central bank building; Inauguration of the Third Republic	Mayon Volcano, Albay; Rhincodon typus; Bicol textile design	November 2010
		₱100	160 × 66	Mauve	Manuel Roxas; Old central bank building; Inauguration of the Third Republic	Mayon Volcano, Albay; Rhincodon typus; Bicol textile design	April 11, 2015
		₱100	160 × 66	Mauve	Manuel Roxas; Old central bank building; Inauguration of the Third Republic	Mayon Volcano, Albay; Rhincodon typus; Bicol textile design	July 29, 2020
		₱200	160 × 66	Green	Diosdado Macapagal; EDSA II revolution; Aguinaldo Shrine, Kawit; Barasoain Church, Malolos	Chocolate Hills, Bohol; Tarsius syrichta; Visayas weave design	November 2010
		₱200	160 × 66	Green	As above but with modified motifs: Declaration of independence; Malolos Congress	Chocolate Hills, Bohol; Tarsius syrichta; Visayas weave design	December 5, 2017
		₱200	160 × 66	Green	As above but with modified motifs: Declaration of independence; Malolos Congress	Chocolate Hills, Bohol; Tarsius syrichta; Visayas weave design	July 29, 2020
		₱500	160 × 66	Yellow	Corazon and Benigno Aquino Jr.; EDSA I revolution; Benigno Aquino monument, Makati	Subterranean Underground River, Puerto Princesa, Palawan; Tanygnathus lucionensis; Southern Philippines cloth design	November 2010
		₱500	160 × 66	Yellow	Corazon and Benigno Aquino Jr.; EDSA I revolution; Benigno Aquino monument, Makati	Subterranean Underground River, Puerto Princesa, Palawan; Tanygnathus lucionensis; Southern Philippines cloth design	July 29, 2020
		₱1000	160 × 66	Blue	José Abad Santos, Vicente Lim and Josefa Llanes Escoda; Philippine Centennial; Medal of Honor	Tubbataha Reefs, Sulu Sea; Pinctada maxima; Mindanao design for T'nalak	November 2010
		₱1000	160 × 66	Blue	As above but without Medal of Honor	Tubbataha Reefs, Sulu Sea; Pinctada maxima; Mindanao design for T'nalak	December 5, 2017
		₱1000	160 × 66	Blue	As above but without Medal of Honor	Tubbataha Reefs, Sulu Sea; Pinctada maxima; Mindanao design for T'nalak	July 29, 2020
For table standards, see the banknote specification table.

=== Polymer series ===
Polymer series (2022–2024)
Image		Value	Dimensions (mm)	Main color	Description		Issue
Obverse	Reverse	Value	Dimensions (mm)	Main color	Obverse	Reverse	Issue
		₱50	160 × 66	Red	Visayan leopard cat (Prionailurus bengalensis rabori); Hibiscus campylosiphon	Taal Lake, Batangas; Caranx ignobilis; Batangas embroidery design	December 19, 2024
		₱100	160 × 66	Violet	Palawan peacock-pheasant (Polyplectron napoleonis); Ceratocentron fesselii	Mayon Volcano, Albay; Rhincodon typus; Bicol textile design	December 19, 2024
		₱500	160 × 66	Yellow	Visayan spotted deer (Rusa alfredi); Acanthephippium mantinianum	Subterranean Underground River, Puerto Princesa, Palawan; Tanygnathus lucionensis; Southern Philippines cloth design	December 19, 2024
		₱1000	160 × 66	Blue	Philippine eagle (Pithecophaga jefferyi); Jasminum sambac	Tubbataha Reefs, Sulu Sea; Pinctada maxima; Mindanao design for T'nalak	April 6, 2022
For table standards, see the banknote specification table.

=== Commemorative banknotes ===
Commemorative banknotes have been issued by the Bangko Sentral ng Pilipinas to memorialize events of historic significance to the Philippines.

The most common method of commemoration is by adding a commemorative overprint on the watermark area of a circulating denomination. There also exist especially printed commemorative higher-denomination non-circulating banknotes, in the following denominations:

- 2,000-piso: Centennial of Declaration of Philippine Independence, 1998
- 100,000-piso: Centennial of Declaration of Philippine Independence, 1998
- 5,000-piso: 2021 Quincentennial Commemorations in the Philippines
- 3,000-piso: 125th Anniversary of the Supreme Court of the Philippines, 2026

== Monetary policy ==
The Bangko Sentral ng Pilipinas (BSP) was established on July 3, 1993, as the Philippines' central bank, succeeding the previous Central Bank of the Philippines which was established in 1949. Its primary monetary policy objective is to promote a low and stable inflation conducive to a balanced and sustainable economic growth. It achieves this objective through inflation targeting, a monetary policy approach where an inflation target is publicly announced, which the BSP then commits to achieve over a two-year horizon by using these monetary policy tools:

- Adjusting the policy rate at which the BSP borrows from banks;
- Open Market Operations where the BSP buys (or sells) government securities and BSP securities in order to increase (or decrease) liquidity;
- Offering term deposits to absorb liquidity;
- Standing Liquidity Facilities to provide liquidity to banks as needed; and
- Increasing (or decreasing) bank reserve requirements to decrease (or increase) remaining liquidity that can be loaned out.

Inflation forecasts exceeding targets are addressed by a contractionary policy to bring down inflation to target by increasing policy rates, increasing reserve requirements, or selling government securities - all resulting in reduced liquidity. An expansionary policy to counteract low inflation brought by economic pessimism involves the opposite steps - lower policy rates, lower reserve requirements, or buying government securities.

== Exchange rates ==
=== Historical exchange rate ===
The official exchange rate was ₱2 against the U.S. dollar from 1946 to 1962, devalued to ₱3.90 in 1962, and devalued again to ₱6.43 in 1970. Black market exchange rates during these periods, however, were nearly always higher than official rates.

Several depreciations followed:

- The peso traded at ₱18 per dollar in 1984 from the dirty float at ₱11.25 in 1983 and ₱21 in 1986.
- In the early 1990s, the peso depreciated again to ₱29 before appreciating to ₱23–₱26 in the middle of the decade.
- Due to the 1997 Asian financial crisis, the peso depreciated from ₱26 in July 1997 to ₱45 in 1998 and to about ₱50 in 2001 before appreciating to ₱41 in 2007.
- In the 2010s, it appreciated to ₱40 in 2012, before depreciating to ₱54/$ in 2018.
- Amidst the COVID-19 pandemic, the peso appreciated as much as ₱47.93 in 2021.
- In 2022, the peso depreciated to ₱59 per dollar, likely as a result of the economic impact of the Russian invasion of Ukraine.
- In 2026, the Philippine peso depreciated to a historic low of around ₱60–61 per U.S. dollar amid the Iran war. On March 19, the peso first breached the ₱60 level, before weakening further and crossing the ₱61 level for the first time on April 28.

Black market exchange rates as seen in the past are now nonexistent, since official exchange rates now reflect underlying supply and demand rather than political considerations.

View source data.

=== Current exchange rate ===
Current PHP exchange rates
From Google Finance:	AUD CAD CHF CNY EUR GBP HKD JPY USD
From Yahoo! Finance:	AUD CAD CHF CNY EUR GBP HKD JPY USD
From XE.com:	AUD CAD CHF CNY EUR GBP HKD JPY USD
From OANDA:	AUD CAD CHF CNY EUR GBP HKD JPY USD

== Recent issues ==
=== Errors in currency ===
In 2005, about 78 million 100-peso notes with President Gloria Macapagal Arroyo's surname misspelled as "Arrovo" were printed and planned to be circulated. The error was only found out after 2 million of the notes had been circulated, and the BSP ordered an investigation.

The incorrect manner in which scientific names of species were printed in the 2010 New Generation Currency Series was addressed in 2017 revisions.

In December 2017, a 100 peso banknote which had no face of Manuel A. Roxas and no electrotype 100 was issued. The Facebook post was shared over 24,000 times. The BSP said that the banknotes are due to a rare misprint.

=== 1-peso coin fraud ===
By August 2006, it became publicly known that the 1-peso coin has the same size as the 1 United Arab Emirates dirham coin. As of 2010, 1 peso is only worth 0.08 dirhams, leading to vending machine fraud in the UAE.

=== Fake denominations ===
In 2017, a one-peso coin that was allegedly minted in 1971 was said to bear the design of the novel Noli Me Tángere by Jose Rizal on the reverse. The coin was allegedly sold for up to ₱1,000,000. The holder of the coin was interviewed by Kapuso Mo, Jessica Soho about this, but potential buyers made no serious offers to purchase the coin, and the BSP said that it did not release any coin of the said design. The BSP also mentioned that the coin is thinner than the circulating coin, which suggests that someone might have tampered with it and replaced it with a different design.

In June 2018, a Facebook page posted a ₱10,000 note with a portrait of President Ramon Magsaysay on the front and a water buffalo and Mount Pinatubo on the back. The Bangko Sentral ng Pilipinas did not issue this banknote and stressed that only 6 denominations were in current circulation (20, 50, 100, 200, 500 and 1,000 pesos). The Facebook page of the BSP said that it was fake. The signature was also of former governor of the Bangko Sentral ng Pilipinas Amando Tetangco Jr. It was found out that the photo was from a different user who found a fake 10,000 peso banknote in a book at a library.

=== Rumour about folded banknotes ===
In July 2022, a Facebook user posted a ₱1,000 banknote (polymer variant) that was slightly folded, and complained that SM Supermalls rejected it as it was folded. The user warned the public to not fold their ₱1,000 polymer banknotes. SM Supermalls through Facebook and the BSP later stated officially that folded polymer notes were accepted.

=== Demonetization ===
A proposal to demonetize ₱500 and ₱1000 bills to deter graft and corruption in the government is currently being studied. However, according to BSP, the proposal will hurt the economy and is not simple, and may cause more damage than good.

== See also ==
- Economy of the Philippines
