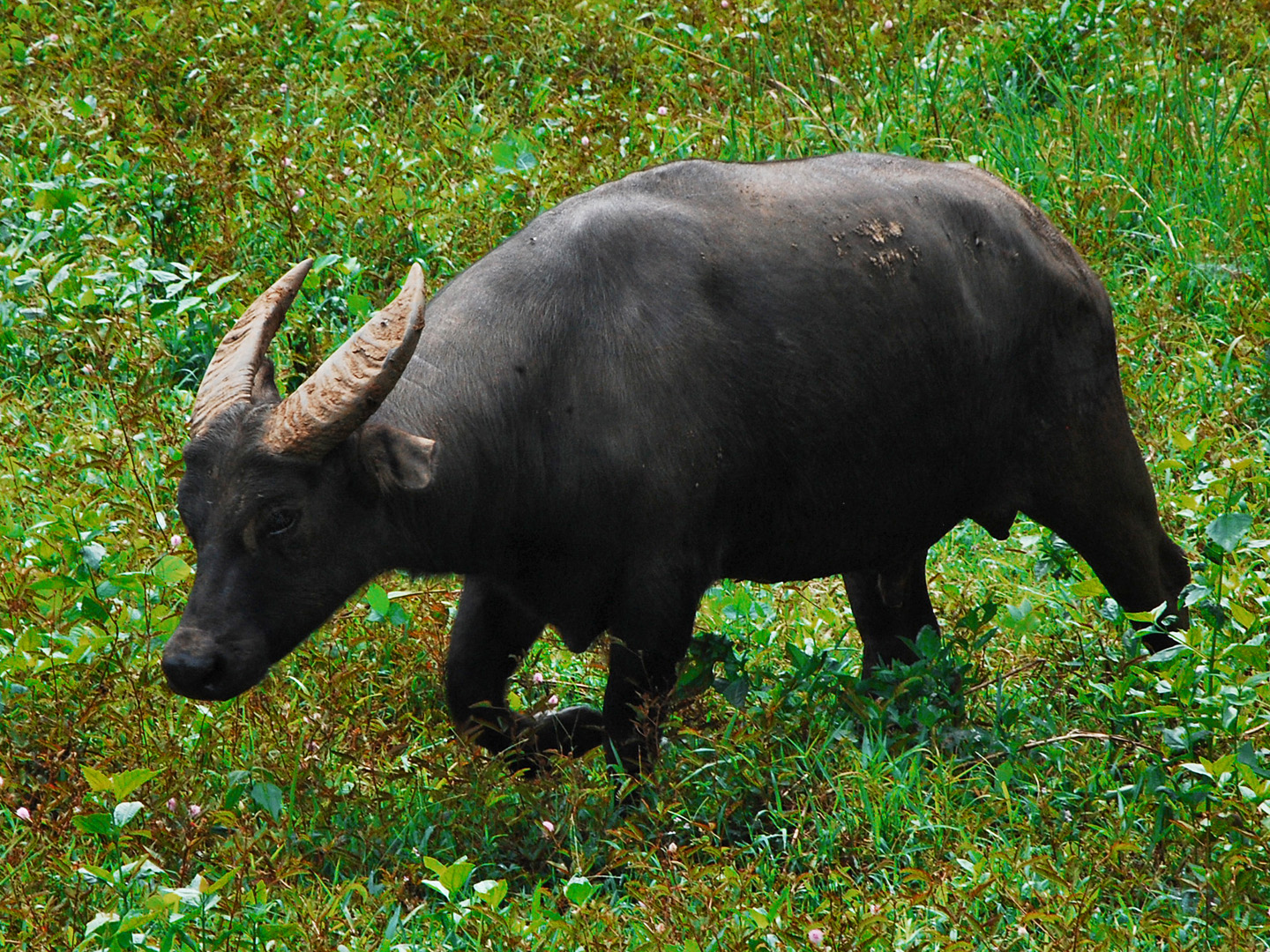
- In the Mounts Iglit-Baco National Park, Philippines

Conservation status
- Critically Endangered (IUCN 3.1)
- CITES Appendix I

Scientific classification
- Kingdom: Animalia
- Phylum: Chordata
- Class: Mammalia
- Order: Artiodactyla
- Family: Bovidae
- Subfamily: Bovinae
- Genus: Bubalus
- Species: B. mindorensis

Binomial name
- Bubalus mindorensis (Heude, 1888)
- Range map in green

Synonyms
- Anoa mindorensis Heude, 1888; Bos mindorensis Lydekker, 1898

= Tamaraw =

Species of buffalo

The tamaraw or Mindoro dwarf buffalo (Bubalus mindorensis) is a small buffalo belonging to the family Bovidae. It is endemic to the island of Mindoro in the Philippines, and is the only endemic Philippine bovine. It is believed, however, to have once also lived on the nearby island of Luzon. The tamaraw was originally found throughout Mindoro, from the coast to over 2000 metres above sea level in the mountains, but because of hunting and habitat loss, it is now restricted to a few remote grassy plains and is a critically endangered species.

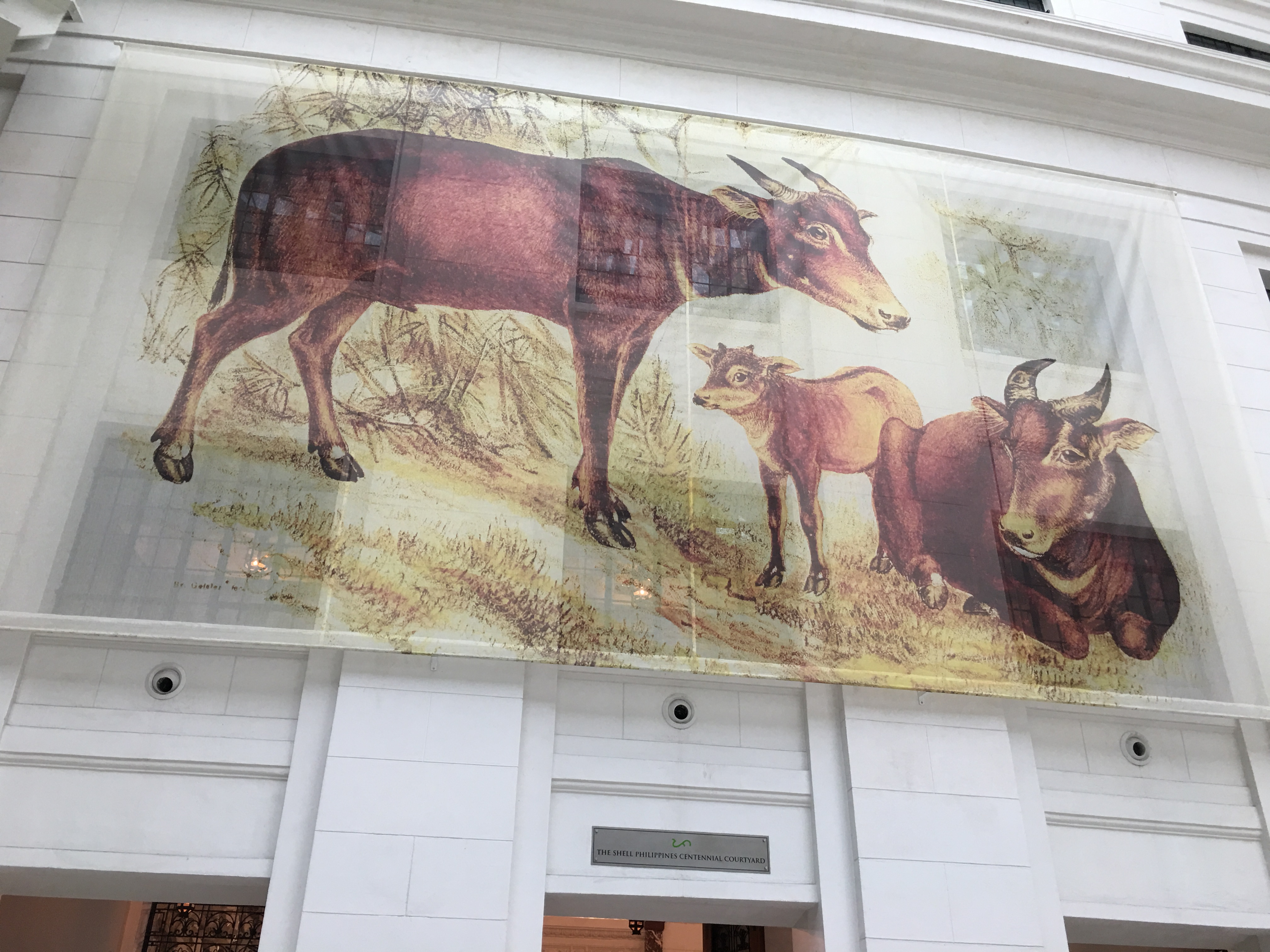
Tamaraw (Inside Philippine National Museum of Natural History)

Contrary to common belief and past classification, the tamaraw is not a subspecies of the water buffalo, nor is it a subspecies of the slightly larger carabao, which is classified as a subspecies of the water buffalo. In contrast to the carabao, the tamaraw has a number of distinguishing characteristics; it is slightly hairier, has light markings on its face, is not gregarious, and has shorter horns that are somewhat V-shaped. It is the second-largest native terrestrial mammal in the country after the carabao.

== Evolutionary history ==
The presence of B. mindorensis on the island of Mindoro, coupled with the discovery of fossil bubalids in other islands around the archipelago, indicates that the family was once widespread throughout the Philippines. In fact, fossil finds from the 20th century have shown that B. mindorensis was once found on the northern Philippine island of Luzon during the Pleistocene.

As a member of the family Bovidae, the tamaraw's close affinity to the water buffalo (B. bubalis) has been validated many times in the past. It was once considered a subspecies of B. bubalis (as Anoa bubalis), Anoa bubalis mindorensis. Recent genetic analysis studies of family members further strengthen this view.

=== Etymology and taxonomic history ===
The tamaraw was originally described as Anoa mindorensis by French zoologist Pierre Marie Heude in 1888. In 1958, it was described as Anoa bubalis mindorensis, a subspecies of the then-water buffalo species (Anoa bubalis). A little over a decade after, the tamaraw was elevated to species status as Anoa mindorensis in 1969.

Later research and analyses of relationships determined the genus Anoa to be a part of the genus Bubalus. The tamaraw's scientific name was updated into its present form, Bubalus mindorensis (sometimes referred to as Bubalus (Bubalus) mindorensis).

The name tamaraw has other variants, such as tamarau, tamarou, and tamarao. The term tamaraw may have come from tamadaw, which is a probable alternative name for the banteng (Bos javanicus).

== Anatomy and morphology ==
B. mindorensis has the appearance of a typical member of its family. It has a compact, heavyset, bovine body, four legs that end in cloven hooves, and a small, horned head at the end of a short neck. It is smaller and stockier compared to the water buffalo (B. bubalis). Little sexual dimorphism is seen in the species, although males are reported to have thicker necks. The tamaraw has a typical shoulder height of 100–105 cm (39–41 in). The length of the body is 2.2 m (7.2 ft), while the tail adds a further 60 cm (24 in). Reported weights have ranged from 180 to 300 kg (400 to 660 lb).

Adults have a dark brown to grayish color and more hair than B. bubalis. The limbs are short and stocky. White markings are seen in the hooves and the inner lower fore legs. These markings are similar to those of the anoa (B. depressicornis). The face is the same color as the body. Most of the members of the species also have a pair of gray-white strips that begins from the inner corner of the eye to the horns. The nose and lips have black skin. The ears are 13.5 cm (5.3 in) long from notch to tip with white markings on the insides.

Both sexes grow short, black horns in a V-shaped manner compared to C-shaped horns of B. bubalis. The horns have flat surfaces and are triangular at their base. Due to the regular rubbing, the tamaraw's horns have a worn outer surface, but with rough inner sides. The horns are reported to be 35.5 to 51.0 cm (14.0 to 20.1 in) long.

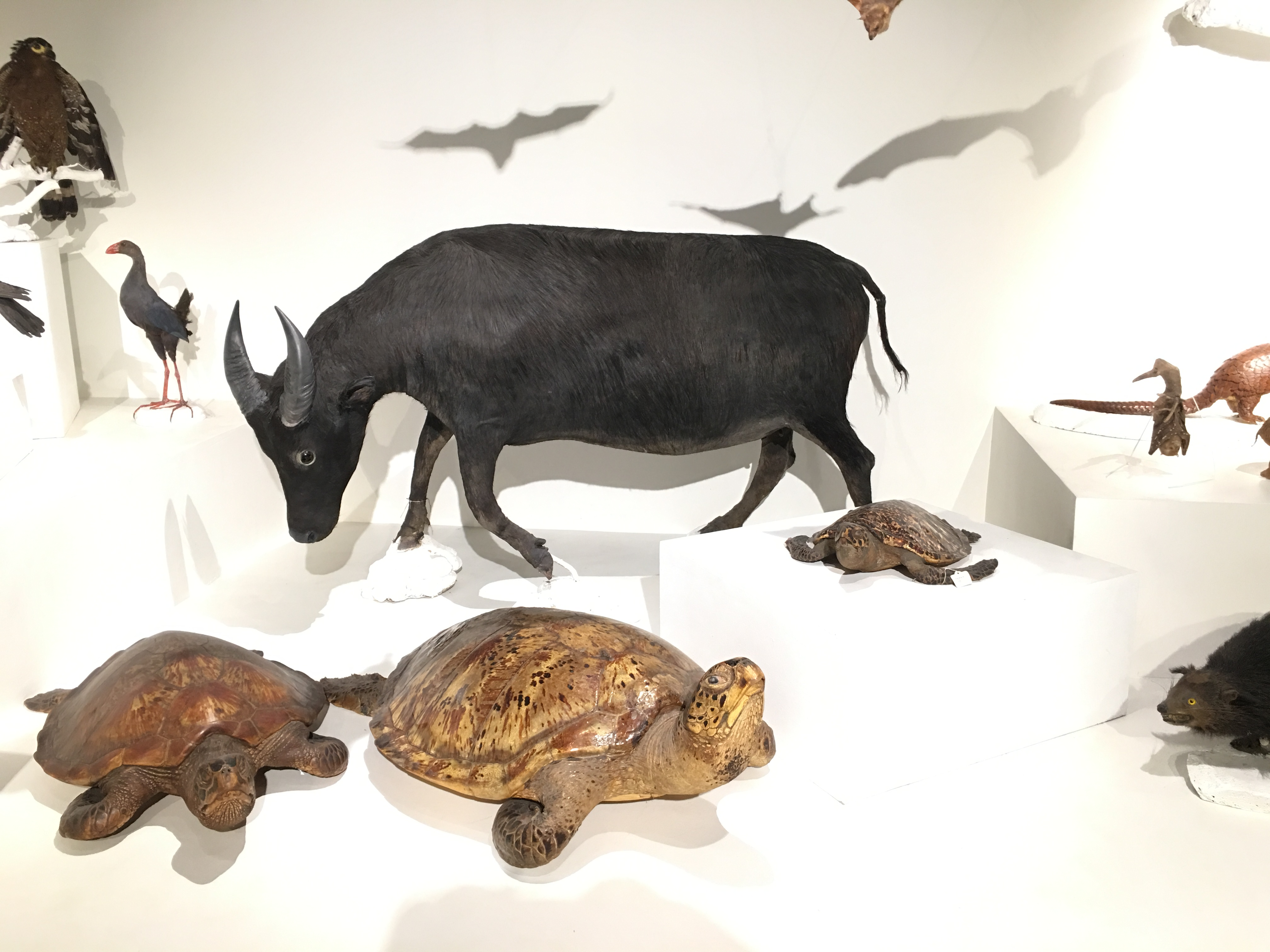
Taxidermied tamaraw in Philippine National Museum of Natural History

== Distribution ==
The tamaraw was first documented in 1888 on the island of Mindoro. Before 1900, most people avoided settling on Mindoro due to a virulent strain of malaria. However, as antimalarial medicine was developed, more people settled on the island. The increase in human activity has drastically reduced tamaraw population. By 1966, the tamaraw's range was reduced to three areas: Mount Iglit, Mount Calavite, and areas near the Sablayan Penal Settlement. By 2000, their range was further reduced to only two areas: the Mounts Iglit–Baco National Park and Aruyan.

Initial estimates of the B. mindorensis population on Mindoro were placed at around 10,000 individuals in the early 1900s. Less than 50 years later in 1949, the population had dwindled to around 1000 individuals. By 1953, fewer than 250 animals were estimated to be alive. These population estimates continually grew smaller until the International Union for Conservation of Nature publication of their 1969 Red Data Book, where the tamaraw population was noted to be an alarmingly low 100 head. This head count rose to 120 animals in 1975. Current estimates place the wild tamaraw population at 30 to 200 individuals.

== Ecology and life history ==
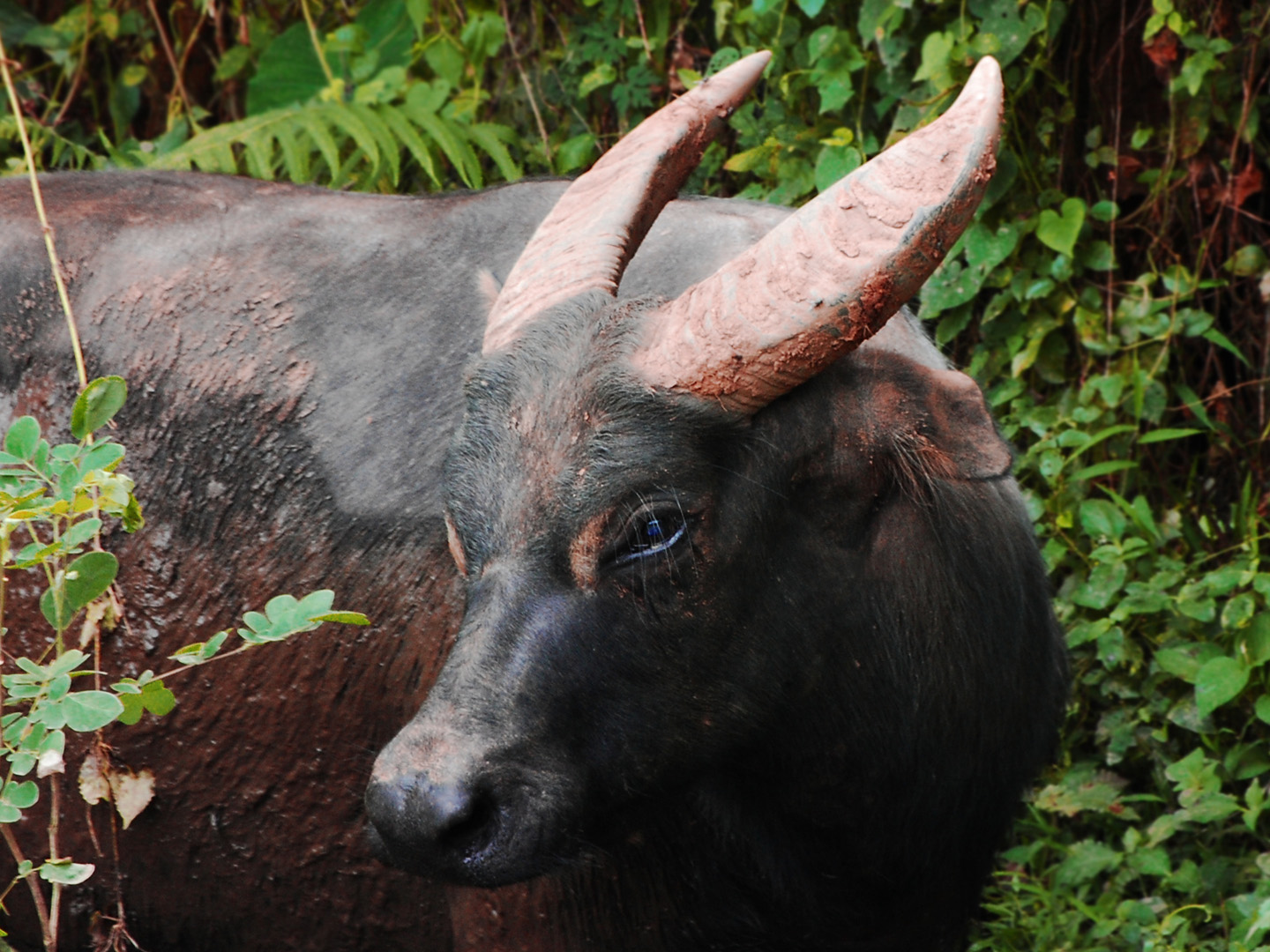
Close-up of a tamaraw

As a rare, endemic mammal on a relatively secluded island, the ecology of the tamaraw is largely unknown. Individuals of the species are reclusive and shy away from humans. In addition, the small sizes of the species' subpopulations, already spread thin throughout their fragmented range (in 1986, about 51 individuals were found in a 20-km^{2} area), make contact with any more than a solitary individual a rarity.

=== Habitat ===
B. mindorensis prefers tropical highland forested areas. It is typically found in thick brush, near open-canopied glades, where it may feed on grasses. Since human habitation and subsequent forest fragmentation of their home island of Mindoro, the habitat preferences of the tamaraw have somewhat expanded to lower-altitude grassy plains. Within their mountainous environment, tamaraws will usually be found not far from sources of water.

=== Trophic ecology ===
The tamaraw is a grazer that feeds on grasses and young bamboo shoots, although it is known to prefer cogon grass and wild sugarcane (Saccharum spontaneum). They are naturally diurnal, feeding during the daytime hours; however, daytime human activities have recently forced select B. mindorensis individuals to be nocturnal to avoid human contact.

=== Life history ===
The tamaraw is known to live for about 20 years, with an estimated lifespan of about 25. The adult female tamaraw gives birth to one offspring after a gestation period around 300 days. There is an interbirth interval of two years, although one female has been sighted with three juveniles. The calf stays for 2–4 years with its mother before becoming independent.

== Behavioral ecology ==
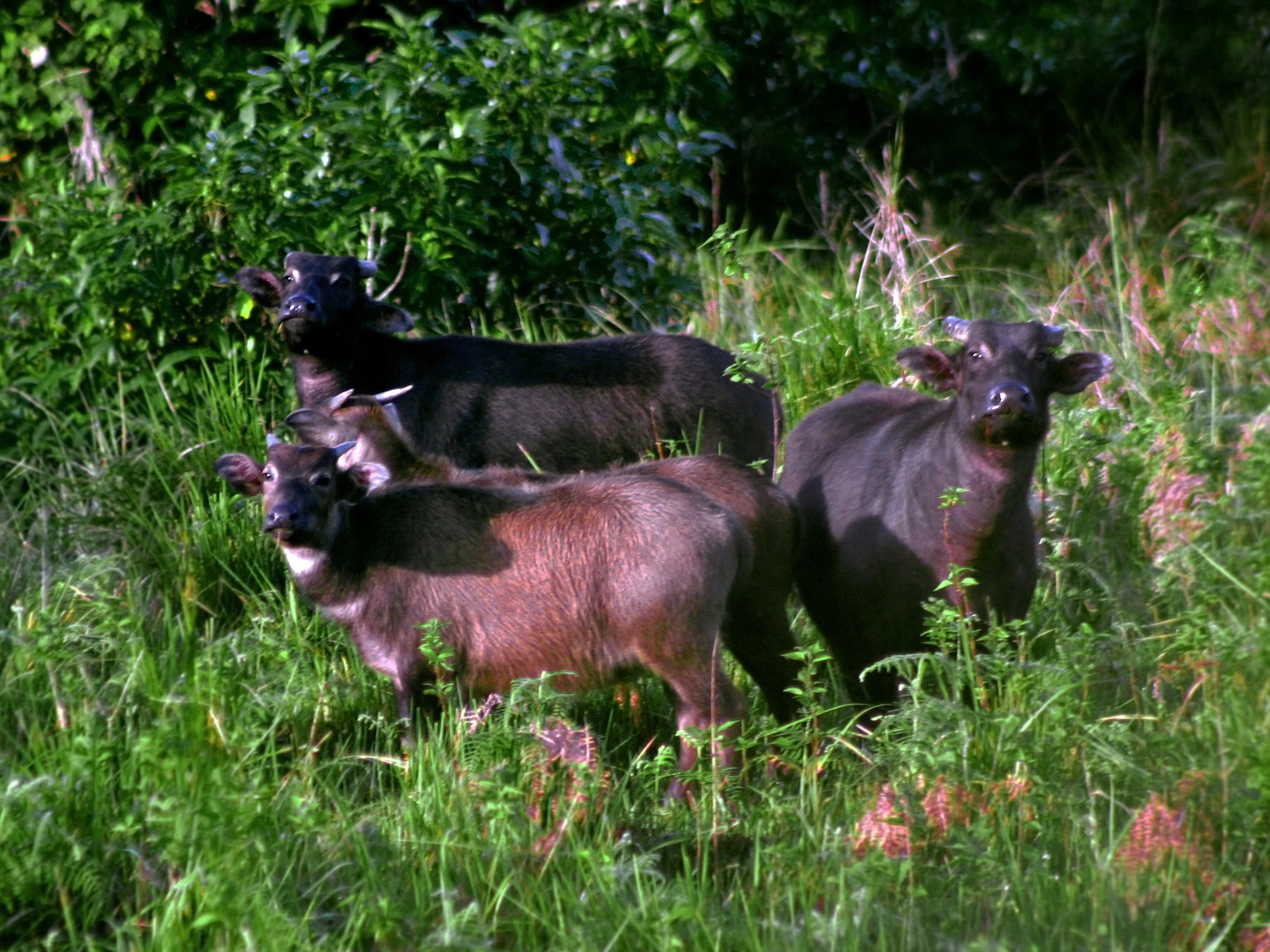
A small family group

Unlike the closely related water buffalo, B. mindorensis is a solitary creature. Adults of the species do not occur in herds or smaller packs, and are often encountered alone. Only juveniles exhibit the typical bovine herding behavior and clan hierarchy often seen in water buffalo. Males and females are known to associate all year round, but this interaction lasts only a few hours. This solitary behavior may be an adaptation to its forest environment. Adult males are often solitary and apparently aggressive, while adult females can be alone, accompanied by a bull, or their young of different ages.

Similar to other bovines the tamaraw wallows in mud pits, maybe to avoid biting insects.

Reports of aggression when cornered are unsubstantiated. Tamaraw threat posture involves lowering the head, and shifting its horns into a vertical position, accompanied by head shaking.

== Conservation ==
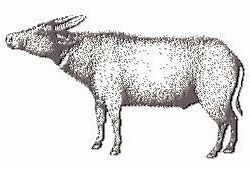
An illustration of a tamaraw

Being an entirely endemic and rare land mammal, B. mindorensis stands as an extremely vulnerable species. Currently, it is classified as a critically endangered species and has been so since 2000 by the IUCN on its IUCN Red List of endangered species. Awareness of the conservation status of B. mindorensis began in 1965, when it was classified as a status inadequately known by the IUCN. Enough data was gathered on the tamaraw population by 1986, and the IUCN conservation monitoring center declared the species endangered. Throughout succeeding surveys conducted in 1988, 1990, 1994 and 1996, the species remained listed on the Red List as endangered. The relisting of the species in 1996 fulfilled the IUCN criteria B1+2c and D1. Criterion B1 indicated that the species' range was less than 500 km^{2}, and is known to exist in less than five independent locations. A noticed continuing decline in the population fulfilled sub-criterion 2c, given the condition of the population's sole habitat. Criterion D1 essentially required that a population be composed of less than 250 mature individuals; individual counts of the B. mindorensis population at the time figured significantly lower than this. In 2000, the tamaraw was relisted on the Red List under the more severe C1 criteria. This was due to estimates that the population would decline by 20% in five years or within the timespan of two generations.

Many factors have contributed to the decline of the tamaraw population. Over the course of the century, the increase in the human population on Mindoro has exposed the island's sole tamaraw population to severe anthropogenic pressures. In the 1930s, the introduction of non-native cattle on the island caused a severe rinderpest epidemic among the tamaraw population then numbering in the thousands. Hunting of tamaraws for food and sustenance has also taken a toll on the species' numbers. The most major factor threatening the survival of B. mindorensis is habitat loss due to infrastructure development, logging, and agriculture. These factors reduced the population of thousands during the early 1900s to less than 300 individuals in 2007.

Due to the decline of the B. mindorensis population, various Philippine laws and organizations have been created towards the conservation of the species. In 1936, Commonwealth Act No. 73 was enacted by the then-Philippine Commonwealth. The act specifically prohibited killing, hunting, and even merely wounding tamaraws, with an exception noted for self-defense (if one were to be attacked by an agitated individual) or for scientific purposes. The penalties were harsh enough to include a hefty fine and imprisonment.

In 1979, an executive order was signed creating a committee specifically geared towards the conservation of the tamaraw; it was referred to as a "source of national pride" in the said order. The Tamaraw Conservation Project was also established in 1979. The organization has successfully bred a tamaraw, nicknamed "Kali", in captivity in 1999. In 2001, Republic Act 9147, or the Wildlife Resources Conservation and Protection Act was enacted to protect the tamaraw and other endemic species from hunting and sale. During the 1970s, a gene pool was established to preserve the tamaraw's numbers. However, the project was not successful, as only one offspring, named "Kali", was produced. As of 2011, Kali was the only surviving animal in the gene pooling project. The project was also not improved as the Protected Areas and Wildlife Bureau showed that the tamaraws were already breeding in the wild. Cloning was not implemented for conservation as the Department of Environment and Natural Resource argued that such measures would diminish the genetic diversity of the species.

A small subpopulation of tamaraws has been found within the confines of the Mt. Iglit Game Refuge and Bird Sanctuary on Mindoro.

As of May 2007, B. mindorensis is on Appendix I of the Convention on International Trade in Endangered Species, where it has been since the species was first put on the list on January 7, 1975. With the listing, CITES recognizes the species as critically endangered and threatened with extinction. Thus, international commercial trade in the species or any derivatives of it, such as meat or horns, is considered illegal. While commercial trade in the species is prohibited, exchange for noncommercial reasons, such as scientific research, is allowed.

The 2002 Presidential Proclamation 273 set October as a "Special Month for the Conservation and Protection of the Tamaraw in Mindoro.".

As of April 2019, according to June Pineda, Tamaraw Conservation Program coordinator of the Department of Environment and Natural Resources, the latest count at Mounts Iglit-Baco National Park in Occidental Mindoro showed 466 to 494 tamaraws, lower than 2018's 523 animals.

Seven years later, estimates from the prior few years ranged from 300 to 500.

== Importance to humans ==
=== Economical and commercial value ===
While not as heavily exploited as other large, endangered mammals, the tamaraw population was subject to some harvesting pressure from subsistence hunters before conservation efforts were spurred towards the latter half of the 20th century. The IUCN has described this as still going on in their 2006 Red List report.

=== In Philippine culture ===
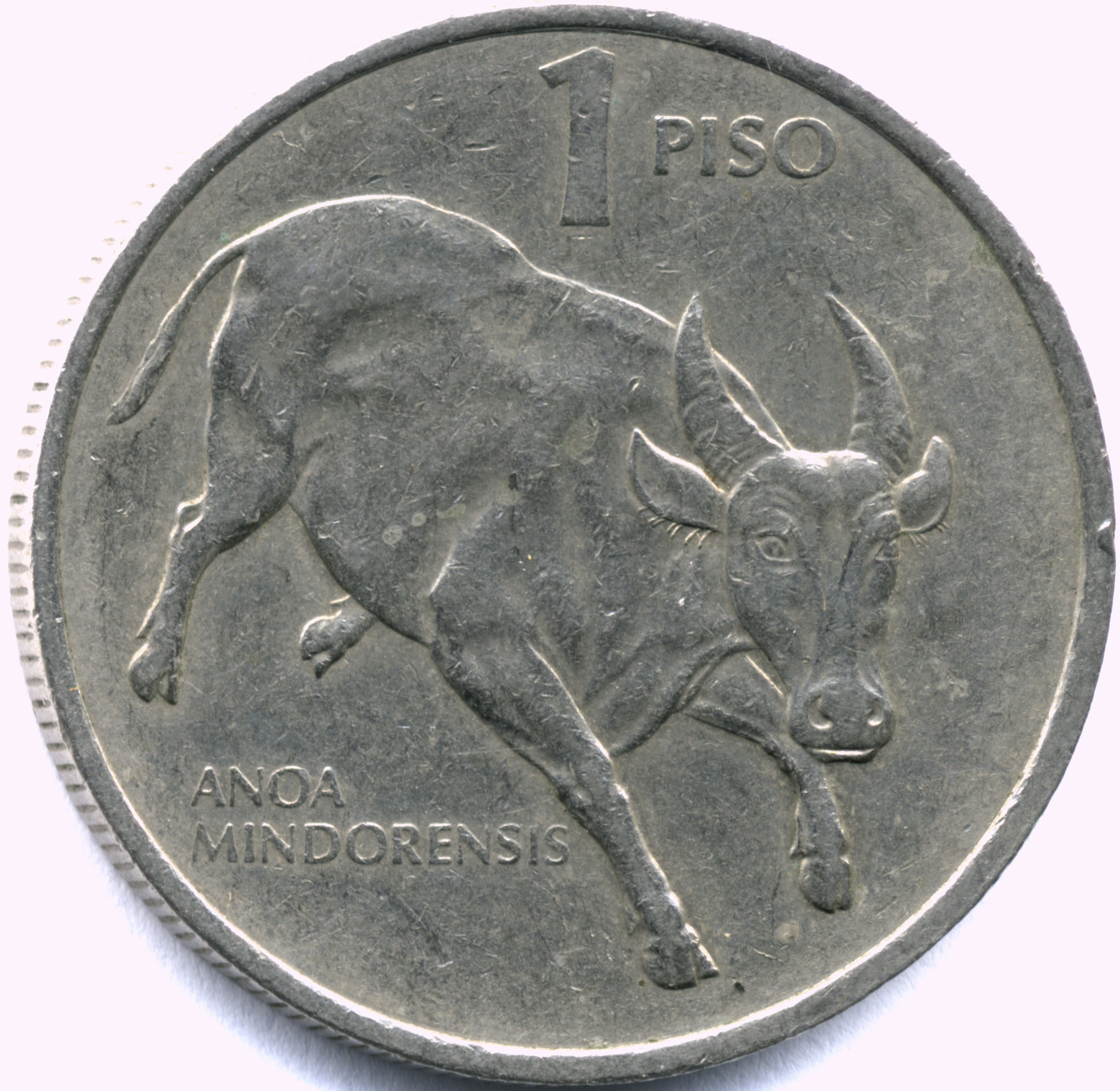
The tamaraw on a 1-peso coin of Flora and Fauna Series.

Though the national animal of the Philippines is the carabao, the tamaraw is also considered a national symbol of the Philippines. An image of the animal is featured on a Flora and Fauna Series 1 peso coin released from 1983 to 1994.

In 2004, Proclamation No. 692 was enacted to make October 1 a special working holiday in the province of Occidental Mindoro. In line with the Tamaraw Conservation Month, the proclamation aimed to remind the people of Mindoro the importance of the conservation of the tamaraw and its environment.

During the wake of the Asian utility popularity in the 1990s, Toyota Motors Philippines released the Toyota Kijang as the Tamaraw FX, an evolution of the Tamaraw AUV. It was widely patronized by taxi operators, and was immediately turned into a staple mode of transportation much like a cross between the taxi and the jeepney. The FX later saw a new generation model known locally as the Revo. The tamaraw is also the mascot of the varsity teams of the Far Eastern University (FEU Tamaraws) in the University Athletic Association of the Philippines, and of the Toyota Tamaraws of the Philippine Basketball Association. The Tamaraw Falls in Barangay Villaflor, Puerto Galera, were also named after the bovine.

== Bibliography ==
- "Bubalus mindorensis". Integrated Taxonomic Information System.
- Callo, R. A. (1991). "The tamaraw population: decreasing or increasing?". Canopy International. 16 (4): 4–9.
- Custodio, Carlo C.; Myrissa V. Lepiten; Lawrence R. Heaney (May 17, 1996). "Bubalus mindorensis". Mammalian Species (520). American Society of Mammalogists: 1–5. doi:10.2307/3504276. JSTOR 3504276.
- Gesch, P. (2004). "Bubalus mindorensis". Animal Diversity Web. University of Michigan Museum of Zoology.
- Heaney, L. R.; J. C. Regalado Jr. (1998). Vanishing treasures of the Philippine rain forest. Chicago, Illinois: Field Museum, Chicago. ISBN 978-0-914868-19-4.
- Momongan, V. G.; G. I. Walde (1993). "Behavior of the endangered tamaraw (Bubalus mindorensis huede) in captivity". Asia Life Sciences. 2 (2): 241–350.
- Bittel, Jason (May 21, 2019). "The Philippines Is Rallying Behind Its Disappearing Dwarf Buffalo". Earth Island Journal.
