= Coins of the Philippine peso =

New Generation Currency Series coins.

Philippine peso coins are issued by the Bangko Sentral ng Pilipinas for circulation in the Philippines and are currently available in seven denominations. The Philippine peso has been in use since Spanish rule.

== History ==
The Philippine peso is derived from the Spanish dollar or pieces of eight brought over in large quantities by the Manila galleons of the 16th to 19th centuries. From the same Spanish peso or dollar is derived the various pesos of Latin America, the dollars of the US and Hong Kong, as well as the Chinese yuan and the Japanese yen.

=== Pre-Hispanic era ===
Gold was an important medium of exchange in the various territories of pre-Hispanic Philippines, in the form of stamped gold beads called piloncitos and gold barter rings. The original silver currency unit was the rupee or rupiah (known locally as salapi), brought over by trade with India and Indonesia. The salapi continued under Spanish rule as a teston worth four reales or half a Spanish peso.

=== Spanish administration ===
The Spanish silver peso worth eight reales was first introduced by the Magellan expedition of 1521 and brought in large quantities by the Manila galleons after the 1565 conquest of the Philippines; see Spanish dollar. The local salapi continued under Spanish rule as a half-peso coin. Additionally, Spanish gold onzas or eight-escudo coins were also introduced with identical weight to the Spanish dollar but valued at 16 silver pesos.

Until the Manila mint was established in 1857 the Philippines had no money of its own. Gold and silver coins brought to it by Spain, China and neighboring countries were in circulation. Denominations consisted of

- In gold escudos: 1/2, 1, 2, 4, 8 escudos; each escudo worth approximately 2 silver pesos or 16 reales.
- In silver reales: 1/2, 1, 2, 4, 8 reales; one peso equals 8 reales.
- In copper: 1/2, 1, 2 cuartos; 20 cuartos in a real and 160 cuartos in a peso.

The Casa de Moneda de Manila (or Manila mint) was founded in 1857 in order to supply smaller Philippine currency after the California gold rush of 1848 made silver more expensive and drained the colony of silver and small gold coins. It produced the following denominations according to Spanish standards, with 100 centimos equal to a peso:

- In gold: 1, 2, 4 pesos; the 4 pesos weighing 6.766 grams of 0.875 fine gold
- In silver: 10, 20, 50 centimos; the 50 centimos weighing 12.98 grams of 0.9 fine silver (fineness reduced to 0.835 in 1881)

The dearth of pre-1857 copper coins were addressed by counterfeit two-cuarto coins (worth 1/80th of a peso) made by Igorot copper miners in the Cordilleras. In 1897 Spain brought over 1-peso silver coins as well as 5 and 10 centimos de peseta to be accepted by Filipinos as 1 and 2 centimos de peso.

=== United States administration ===
The United States also struck coins for use in the Philippines from 1903 to 1945. Denominations included the 1/2 centavo, one centavo, five centavo, 10 centavo, 20 centavo, 50 centavo, and one peso. The 1/2 and 1 centavo coins were struck in bronze, the 5 centavo struck in copper (75%) - nickel (25%), the 10, 20, 50 centavo and peso coins were struck in a silver composition. From 1903 to 1906, the silver coins had a silver content of 90%, while those struck after 1906 had a reduced silver content of 75% for 10 through 50 centavos and 80% for the peso. In both cases the silver was alloyed with copper.

The obverse of these coins remained largely unchanged during the years 1903 to 1945. The 1/2 centavo, one centavo, and five centavo coins depict a Filipino man kneeling against an anvil, with a hammer resting at his side. He is on the left side (foreground), while on the right side (background) there is a simmering volcano, Mt. Mayon, topped with smoke rings. This figure is an allegory for the hard work being done by the native peoples of the Philippines in building their own future.

The obverse of the 10, 20, 50 centavo, and peso coins are similar, but they show the figure of Liberty, a standing female figure (considered by many to be the daughter of the designer 'Blanca') in the act of striking the anvil with a hammer. This was done to show the work being done by Americans in building a better Philippines. Liberty appears on the silver coins, instead of the base metal coins.

The reverse of the coins comes in two varieties. The earliest coins were minted when the islands were a US Territory, and they bear the arms of the US Territories. This is a broad winged eagle, sitting atop a shield divided into two registers. The upper register has 13 stars, and the lower register has 13 vertical stripes. The date appears at the bottom, and "United States of America" appears at the top.

When the islands became a US Commonwealth, the arms of the Commonwealth were adopted. This seal is composed of a much smaller eagle with its wings pointed up, perched over a shield with peaked corners, above a scroll reading "Commonwealth of the Philippines". It is a much busier pattern, and widely considered less attractive.

Coins were minted at the Philadelphia, San Francisco, Denver, and (after it was opened in 1920) Manila mints. Most of the coins struck at the Manila mint occurred after 1925.

Proof sets were struck for collectors from 1903 to 1908. It is likely that a large majority of these sets remained unsold at the time they were issued. The recorded mintage for sets in 1905, 1906, and 1908 is a modest 500.

Defenders of Corregidor threw a large number of silver coins into the ocean, rather than allow the Japanese to accumulate this wealth. A great deal of the booty was later recovered, but many of those were badly corroded.

Among the rarest coins in the U.S. Philippines series from the collectors' standpoint are the 1906-S One Peso, the 1916-S Five Centavos, the 1918-S Five Centavo Mule, the 1903-S Twenty Centavos (especially in Mint State) and the 1915-S One Centavo.

Three Commemorative coins were minted to celebrate the Commonwealth in 1936. They show President Franklin D. Roosevelt, Commonwealth President Manuel L. Quezon and U.S. High Commissioner Frank Murphy, who also has served as the last Governor General of the Islands. The 50 Centavo commemorative has a reported mintage of 20,000 pieces, was struck in 75% silver, and weighs 10 grams (the same specifications as other 50 centavos). The two varieties of One Peso commemorative had reported mintages of 10,000 pieces. They weigh 20 grams, and are 90% silver.

==== Culion leper colony coinage ====
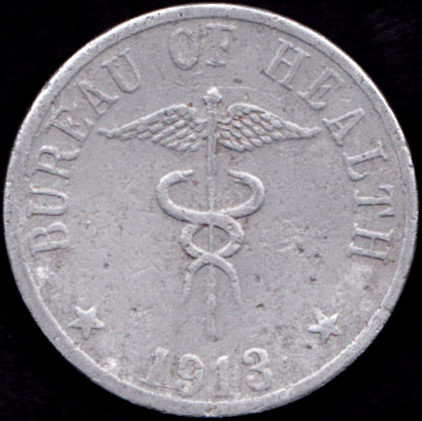
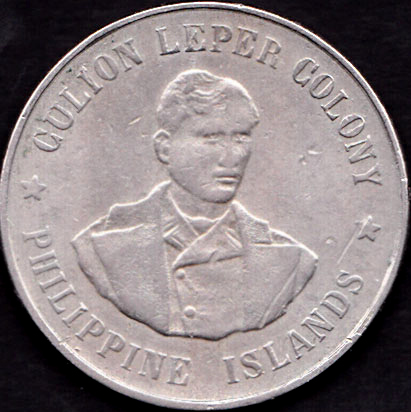
Obverse of Culion leper colony 1-peso coins from 1913 (left) and 1925 (right).

The Culion leper colony was established in May 1906 by the Insular Government of the Philippine Islands in Culion Island, Palawan. It was modeled after the Kalaupapa Leprosy Settlement in Molokai, Hawaii. It was issued its own Special Culion Currency due to the erroneous belief that leprosy could be transmitted via handling of money. Only inmates of the colony were allowed to use what was commonly known as "leper money." It was prohibited for inmates to use regular Philippine currency, and it was prohibited for non-lepers to use the Culion currency. The first and second issues (1913 and 1920) were struck in aluminum by the Frank & Co. die establishment. All subsequent issues were minted by the newly reopened Manila Mint. The third issue (1922) was also aluminum, but the fourth, fifth, and sixth issues (1925, 1927, and 1930) were in copper-nickel alloy. The sixth issue was the final issue. In total, around 169,000 coins were struck for the Culion leper colony, between 1913 and 1930.

By the 1920s, the segregation laws were relaxed. Non-leper settlers (locally known as sano) started coming into the island, mostly family members of the thousands of inmates who were forcibly relocated to the island during via the segregation program. However, exchange of money between the leper inmates and the non-leper settlers was still prohibited. In 1942, during the Japanese invasion of the Philippines in World War II, Culion was cut off from Manila, leading to a shortage of currency. The local Culion authorities issued an emergency currency printed on paper, with centavo denominations in pink paper and peso denominations in blue paper. The Japanese later attacked the island and destroyed its port, radio tower, and electricity generators, cutting off all supplies and contact to the island. This resulted in widespread starvation that resulted in 2,000 deaths. People who fled the island were also killed. It wasn't until 1945 that the US Army Air Corps was able to drop supplies on the island by parachute.

After independence, the segregation law was revised to allow private home isolation and treatment, removing the need for a leper colony. By the 1980s, multi-drug therapies had reduced the status of leprosy to a treatable disease. In 2006, it was declared a leprosy-free area by the World Health Organization. The currency is discontinued but remains popular among coin collectors.

=== After Philippine independence, 1946-1994 ===
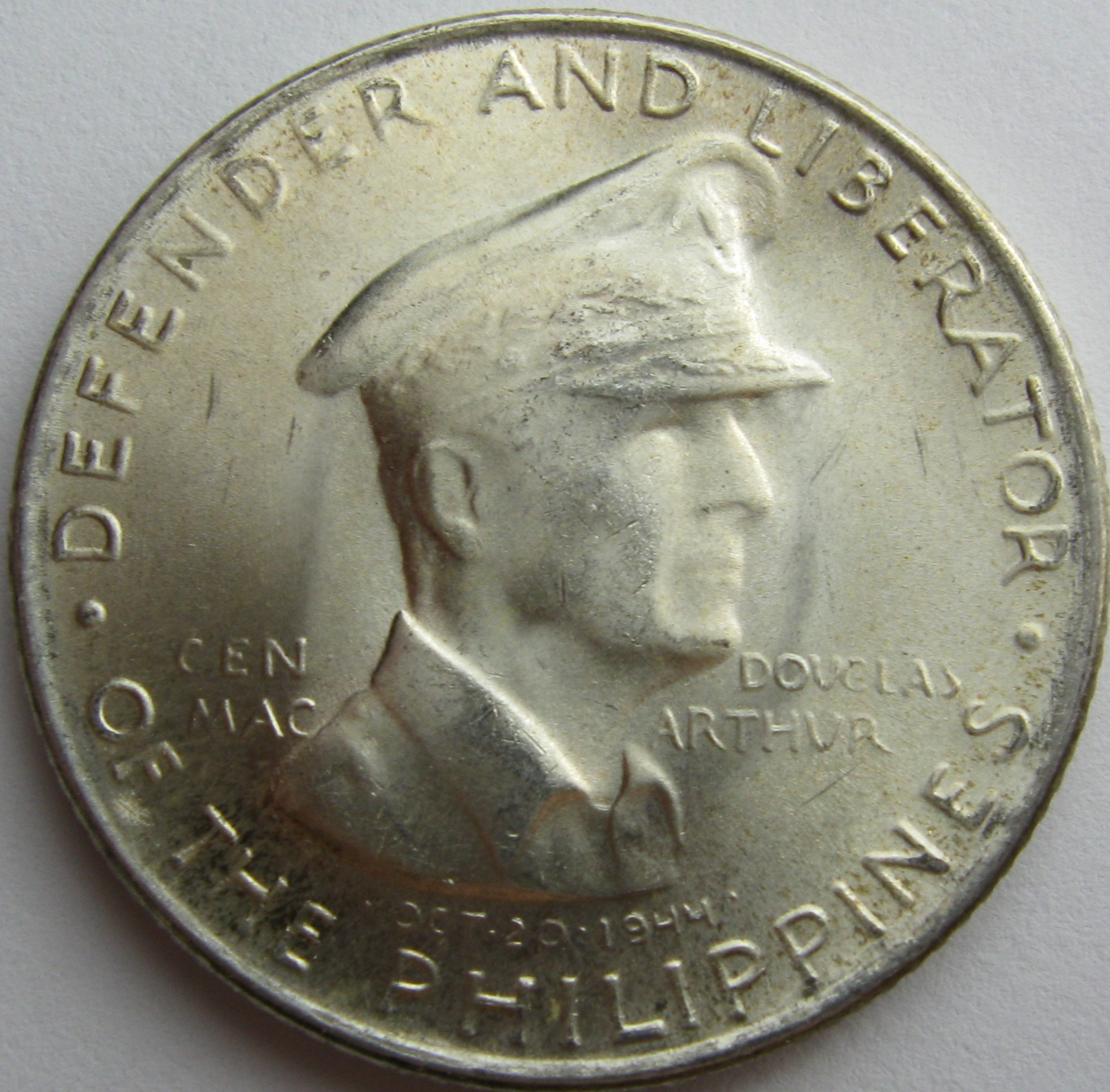
A commemorative coin featuring Douglas MacArthur.

After the granting of independence to the Philippines in 1946, no coins were minted for the Philippine Republic until 1958, other than a small silver commemorative issue in 1947 to honor General Douglas MacArthur. A total of 200,000 50 centavos and 100,000 one peso coins were minted with the general's image on the obverse and the national coat-of-arms on the reverse. Struck at the San Francisco Mint, they carry the "S" mintmark below the date.

In 1958, the 20 centavos was replaced with a 25 centavos and all coins were resized to be the same diameter as their US equivalents, albeit in more base metals, other than the centavo. The same seated man with anvil and volcano or standing liberty with anvil and volcano designs were retained for the obverses while the seal of the Central Bank of the Philippines dominated the reverse. These coins were minted by the Philadelphia Mint from 1958 through 1963, and then by the Royal Mint in England and the Vereinigte Deutsche Metallweke in West Germany in 1965 (dated 1964) and 1966. In view of all subsequent issues using the Tagalog language, this coinage is often referred to as the English Series since it uses the English language.

The next series was introduced in 1967, introducing images of various Philippine national heroes, and the use of the Tagalog (or "Pilipino") language, hence being called the Pilipino Series. The sizes of the coins were reduced. These coins were struck by the various US mints, except for some 50 centavos pieces dated 1972 which were minted in Singapore, and a couple commemorative issues struck by the Sherritt Mint in Canada. In 1972 the one peso denomination was reintroduced.

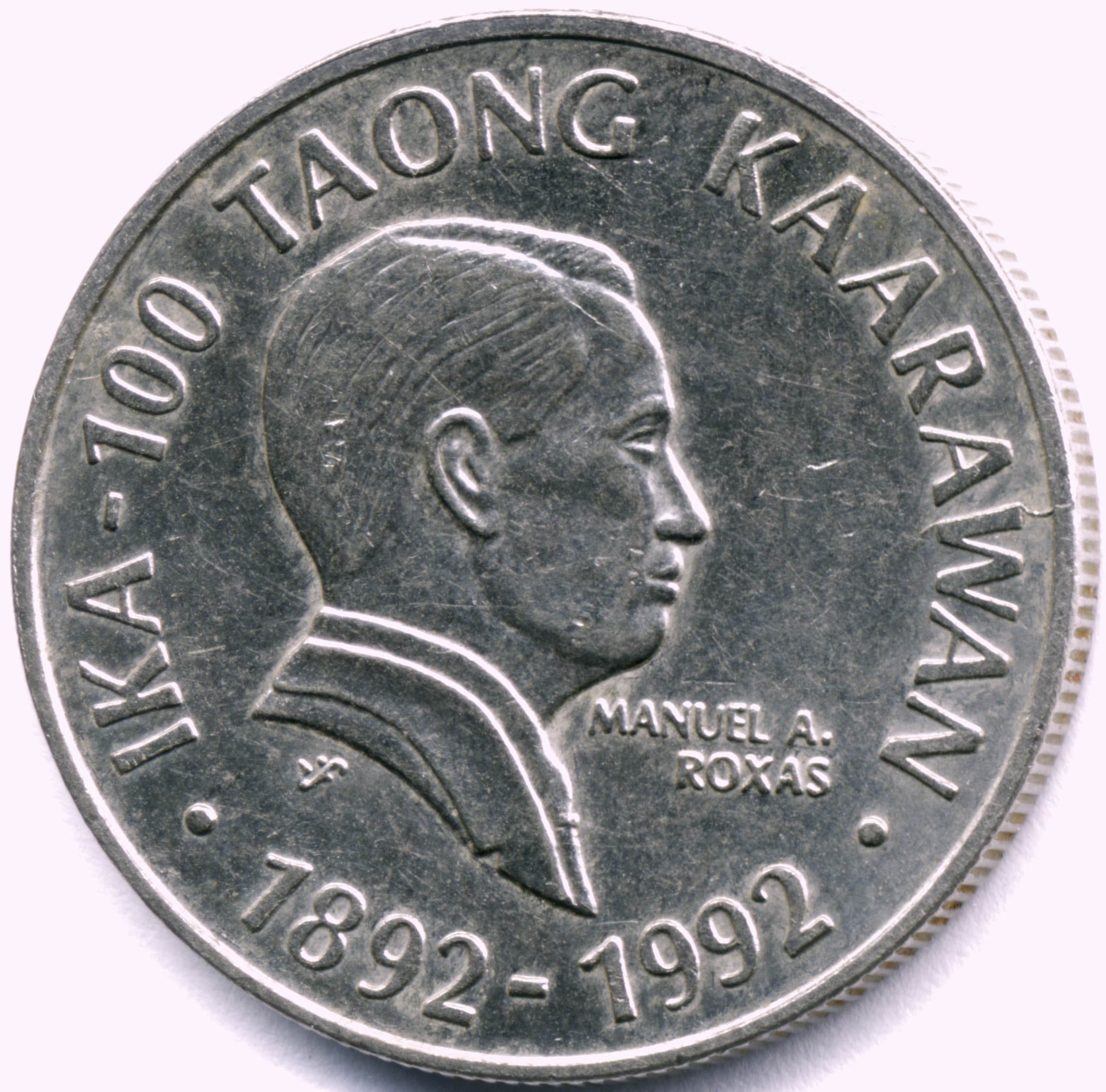
During the time when the Flora and Fauna Series was minted, commemorative coins were also issued, this one commemorates the centennial of the birth of Manuel Roxas, the denomination was a 2 peso coin.

In commemoration of Fedinand Marcos' declaration of Martial Law (which he titled "Ang Bagong Lipunan," the new society), a new series of coinage was issued in 1975, referred to as the Ang Bagong Lipunan Series. The 50 sentimo was done away with as a denomination and a new 5 peso issue took its place. A variety of mints provided these coins, including the Royal Mint in England and the Vereinigte Deutsche Metallweke in West Germany, Philadelphia and San Francisco mints in the US, the Franklin Mint (a private mint also in the US), the Sherritt Mint in Canada, and finally the Philippine's own mint, once it was opened and able to produce coinage. From this point on, the Philippine Mint (Bangko Sentral ng Pilipinas, "BSP") produced nearly all Philippine coinage.

After eight years, the Ang Bagong Lipunan series gave way to a new series titled the Flora and Fauna Series, in which the coins, in addition to featuring various Philippine national heroes as before, also began featuring various plant and animal life forms native to the Philippines. The 50 sentimo and 2 piso denominations were reintroduced, which latter had not been struck as a coin since the Spanish had struck it in gold. The 5 piso denomination was stopped, but resumed (in a new smaller size) concurrent to the final four years of the Improved Flora and Fauna Series which featured reduced sizes for all denominations. The Flora and Fauna Series was struck from 1983 through 1994.

=== Philippine issues since 1995 ===
In June 1995, the new BSP Series was introduced, which is still circulating today. Only this current series of coins are legal tender since May 1, 2020, when the Bangko Sentral ng Pilipinas demonetized the commemorative coins under the Flora and Fauna series. Coins under this series originally included 1, 5, 10 and 25-sentimo, 1-piso and 5-piso. The series' 5-piso was made to replace the 5-piso note at the said month of 1995. However, a bimetallic 10-piso coin was added in 2000 to replace the 10-piso note the following year in July 2001.

Recently, fake 10 and 5-piso coins dating 2001 and 2002 have entered circulation. Because of this, the Bangko Sentral ng Pilipinas issued a warning and several security measures on importing and falsifying Philippine coins. And it is because the BSP has announced that there is an artificial shortage of coins last June 2006. The BSP has asked the public to use all small coins or to have them exchanged for banknotes in local banks or other financial institution.

Denominations worth 25 sentimo (~US$0.005) and below are still issued but have been increasingly regarded as a nuisance. Proposals to retire and demonetize all coins less than one peso in value have been rejected by the government and the BSP.

On November 30, 2017, the Bangko Sentral ng Pilipinas released the New Generation Currency Series coins with circulation starting December 2017. As a tribute to the 154th birth anniversary of Andres Bonifacio, the first coin to be released was the new silver-colored 5-peso coin featuring Bonifacio on the obverse, replacing Emilio Aguinaldo. The reverse features the Tayabak plant and the 2010 BSP logo. The rest of the NGC coin series were presented on March 26, 2018. A 20-peso coin was added to the series on December 17, 2019, in order to replace the overused 20-piso banknote with a coin that could last 10–15 years longer in circulation.

== Formerly circulating coins ==
=== Spanish administration ===
Spanish administration to 1898
Image	Face Value	Technical parameters			Description			Years of Issue	
Image	Face Value	Diameter	Mass	Composition	Edge	Obverse	Reverse	Introduced	Withdrawn
	1/2 cuarto (~0.3 centimo)	18 mm		Copper	Plain		Spanish coat of arms	1798	1904
	1 cuarto (~0.6 centimo)	22 mm		Copper	Plain		Spanish coat of arms	1817	1904
	2 cuartos (1.25 centimos)	28 mm		Copper	Plain		Spanish coat of arms	1834	1904
	10 centimos	18 mm	2.6 g	90% silver (83.5% after 1881)	Reeded	Queen Isabela II or King Alfonso XII	Spanish coat of arms	1864	1904
	20 centimos	23 mm	5.2 g	90% silver (83.5% after 1881)	Reeded	Queen Isabela II or King Alfonso XII	Spanish coat of arms	1864	1904
	50 centimos	30 mm	13.0 g	90% silver (83.5% after 1881)	Edge lettering	Queen Isabela II or King Alfonso XII	Spanish coat of arms	1864	1904
	1 peso	37 mm	25.0 g	90% silver	Edge lettering	King Alfonso XIII	Spanish coat of arms	1897	1904
	1 peso	15 mm	1.69 g	87.5% gold	Reeded	Queen Isabela II or King Alfonso XII	Spanish coat of arms	1861	1904
	2 pesos	18 mm	3.38 g	87.5% gold	Reeded	Queen Isabela II or King Alfonso XII	Spanish coat of arms	1861	1904
	4 pesos	21 mm	6.76 g	87.5% gold	Reeded	Queen Isabela II or King Alfonso XII	Spanish coat of arms	1861	1904

=== The Philippines under U.S. Sovereignty ===
The Philippines under U.S. Sovereignty (1898–1935)
Image		Face Value	Technical parameters				Description			Total Mintage	Years of Issue
Obverse	Reverse	Face Value	Diameter	Thickness	Mass	Composition	Edge	Obverse	Reverse	Total Mintage	Years of Issue
		1/2 centavo	17.5 mm		2.59 g	Bronze	Plain	Figure of a man seated beside an anvil holding a hammer and Mt. Mayon	Eagle atop stars-and-stripes shield; legend "United States of America"; mint date & mintmark	12,084,000; 5,654,000; 471; 500; 500	1903; 1904; 1905; 1906; 1908
		1 centavo	24 mm		5.18 g	Bronze	Plain	Figure of a man seated beside an anvil holding a hammer and Mt. Mayon	Eagle atop stars-and-stripes shield; legend "United States of America"; mint date & mintmark	10,790,000; 17,040,400; 10,000,000; 500; 500; 2,187,000; 1,737,612; 2,700,000; 4,803,000; 3,001,000; 5,000,000; 5,000,500; 2,500,000; 4,330,000; 7,070,000; 11,660,000; 4,540,000; 2,500,000; 3,552,259; 7,282,673; 3,519,100; 9,325,000; 9,000,000; 9,279,000; 9,150,000; 5,657,161; 5,577,000; 5,659,355; 4,000,000; 8,392,692; 3,179,000; 17,455,463	1903; 1904; 1905; 1906; 1908; 1908 S 1909 S 1910 S 1911 S 1912 S 1913 S 1914 S 1915 S 1916 S 1917 S 1918 S 1919 S 1920 S 1920; 1921; 1922; 1925 M 1926 M 1927 M 1928 M 1929 M 1930 M 1931 M 1932 M 1933 M 1934 M 1936 M
		5 centavos	20.5 mm (1903–1928) 19 mm (1930–1935)		5.00 g (1903–1928) 4.87 g (1930–1935)	Copper-Nickel	Plain	Figure of a man seated beside an anvil holding a hammer and Mt. Mayon	Eagle atop stars-and-stripes shield; legend "United States of America"; mint date & mintmark	yyyy	1903; 1904; 1905; 1906; 1908; 1916 S 1917 S 1918 S 1919 S 1920; 1921; 1925 M 1926 M 1927 M 1928 M 1929 M 1930 M 1931 M 1932 M 1933 M 1934 M 1935 M
		10 centavos	17.5 mm (1903–1906) 16.5 mm (1907–1935)		2.69 g (1903–1906) 2 g (1907–1935)	90% Silver (1903–1906) 75% Silver (1907–1935)	Reeded	Lady Liberty striking an anvil with a hammer and Mt. Mayon	Eagle atop stars-and-stripes shield; legend "United States of America"; mint date & mintmark	yyyy	1903; 1903 S 1904; 1904 S 1905; 1906; 1907; 1907 S 1908; 1908 S 1909 S 1911 S 1912 S 1913 S 1914 S 1915 S 1916 S 1917 S 1918 S 1919 S 1920; 1921; 1929 M 1935 M
		20 centavos	23 mm (1903–1906) 20 mm (1907–1929)		5.384 g (1903–1906); 4 g (1907–1929)	90% Silver (1903–1906) 75% Silver (1907–1935)	Reeded	Lady Liberty striking an anvil with a hammer and Mt. Mayon	Eagle atop stars-and-stripes shield; legend "United States of America"; mint date & mintmark	yyyy	1903; 1903 S 1904; 1904 S 1905; 1905 S 1906; 1907; 1907 S 1908; 1908 S 1909 S 1910 S 1911 S 1912 S 1913 S 1914 S 1915 S 1916 S 1917 S 1918 S 1919 S 1920; 1921; 1928 M 1929 M
		50 centavos	30 mm (1903–1906) 27 mm (1907–1921)		13.478 g (1903–1906); 10 g (1907–1935)	90% Silver (1903–1906) 75% Silver (1907–1935)	Reeded	Lady Liberty striking an anvil with a hammer and Mt. Mayon	Eagle atop stars-and-stripes shield; legend "United States of America"; mint date & mintmark	yyyy	1903; 1903 S 1903 S 1904; 1904 S 1905; 1905 S 1906; 1907; 1907 S 1908; 1908 S 1909 S 1917 S 1918 S 1919 S 1920; 1921
		1 Peso	38 mm (1903–1906) 35 mm (1907–1912)		26.956 g (1903–1906); 20 g (1907–1912)	90% Silver (1903–1906) 75% Silver (1907–1935)	Reeded	Lady Liberty striking an anvil with a hammer and Mt. Mayon	Eagle atop stars-and-stripes shield; legend "United States of America"; mint date & mintmark	yyyy	1903; 1903 S 1904; 1904 S 1905; 1905 S 1906; 1906 S 1907 S 1908; 1908 S 1909 S 1910 S 1911 S 1912 S

=== Commonwealth Issues ===
In 1935, when the Commonwealth was established by the Congress of the United States, they issued a three-piece commemorative set (that sold very poorly) to commemorate the occasion. In 1937, the Commonwealth Arms were adapted to all circulating coinage. (Mint marks are M for Manila, D for Denver, S for San Francisco, and no mint mark for Philadelphia)

Commonwealth Issues
Image		Face Value	Technical parameters				Description			Total Mintage	Years of Issue
Obverse	Reverse	Face Value	Diameter	Thickness	Mass	Composition	Edge	Obverse	Reverse	Total Mintage	Years of Issue
		1 centavo	24 mm		5.18g	Bronze	Plain	The figure of an adolescent native, seated at an anvil and holding a hammer in his right hand. In the distance is seen the smoking volcano of Mt. Mayon, located on the main island of Luzon. The statement of value appears above him (One, and/or Five Centavos) in English, while the name of the archipelago is written below in Spanish as FILIPINAS. (Note: All of these coins bore a single reverse design, the federal shield surmounted by an American eagle clutching an olive branch in its right claw and a bundle of arrows in its left. Around this appeared the legend UNITED STATES OF AMERICA and the date of coinage. The obverse of the minor coins (the half centavo and one centavo, both coined in bronze, and the copper-nickel five centavos) featured the semi-nude figure of an adolescent native, seated at an anvil and holding a hammer in his right hand. In the distance is seen the smoking volcano of Mt. Mayon, located on the main island of Luzon. The statement of value appears above him in English, while the name of the archipelago is written below in Spanish as FILIPINAS. This employment of Spanish is curious, given the islands’ recent history, yet it remained for some years afterward the principal language of the educated class. For the silver coins (ten, twenty and fifty centavos, plus the one-peso piece), the standing figure of an adolescent female was utilized. She is clad in a long, flowing gown and holds in her right hand a hammer, resting atop an anvil, as seen on the minor coins. Behind her is again Mt. Mayon, an almost perfectly conical volcanic mountain northeast of the capital city of Manila. These designs are credited to Filipino sculptor Melecio Figueroa, who lived just long enough to see his coins enter circulation.)	The coat of arms of the Commonwealth of the Philippines. Around this appeared the legend UNITED STATES OF AMERICA, the mint mark, and the date of coinage. (Note: The transition from protectorate to commonwealth, which occurred November 15, 1935, was commemorated on a set of three coins dated 1936-M. The fifty-centavo piece shows facing portraits of outgoing Governor-General Frank Murphy and incoming President Manuel Quezon. They are portrayed again on one of the peso coins, this time in profile, their busts overlapping. This same configuration is used for the other one-peso commemorative, but on its obverse the subjects are President Quezon and President of the United States Franklin D. Roosevelt. This is a very rare instance of a living U. S. president appearing on a United States coin. The common reverse for all three coins depicted the arms of the Commonwealth of the Philippines. Featuring elements symbolic of Spain, The USA and the islands themselves, it was adopted as the common reverse for all regular-issue coins beginning in 1937.)	15,790,492; 10,000,000; 6,500,000; 4,000,000; 5,000,000; 58,000,000	1937 M 1938 M 1939 M 1940 M 1941 M 1944 S
		5 centavos	19 mm	1.9 mm	4.9 g	75% Copper 25% Nickel Zinc	Plain	The figure of an adolescent native, seated at an anvil and holding a hammer in his right hand. In the distance is seen the smoking volcano of Mt. Mayon, located on the main island of Luzon. The statement of value appears above him (One, and/or Five Centavos) in English, while the name of the archipelago is written below in Spanish as FILIPINAS.	The coat of arms of the Commonwealth of the Philippines. Around this appeared the legend UNITED STATES OF AMERICA, the mint mark, and the date of coinage.	2,493,872; 4,000,000; 2,750,000; 21,198,000 14,040,000; 72,796,000	1937 M 1938 M 1941 M 1944; 1944 S 1945 S
		10 centavos	16.5 mm		2 g	75% Silver 25% Copper	Reeded	The standing figure of an adolescent female was utilized. She is clad in a long, flowing gown and holds in her right hand a hammer, resting atop an anvil, as seen on the minor coins. Behind her is again Mt. Mayon, an almost perfectly conical volcanic mountain southeast of the capital city of Manila. The statement of value appears above her (Ten, Twenty, and/or Fifty Centavos) in English, while the name of the archipelago is written below in Spanish as FILIPINAS. (Note: All of these coins bore a single reverse design, the federal shield surmounted by an American eagle clutching an olive branch in its right claw and a bundle of arrows in its left. Around this appeared the legend UNITED STATES OF AMERICA and the date of coinage. The obverse of the minor coins (the half centavo and one centavo, both coined in bronze, and the copper-nickel five centavos) featured the semi-nude figure of an adolescent native, seated at an anvil and holding a hammer in his right hand. In the distance is seen the smoking volcano of Mt. Mayon, located on the main island of Luzon. The statement of value appears above him in English, while the name of the archipelago is written below in Spanish as FILIPINAS. This employment of Spanish is curious, given the islands’ recent history, yet it remained for some years afterward the principal language of the educated class. For the silver coins (ten, twenty and fifty centavos, plus the one-peso piece), the standing figure of an adolescent female was utilized. She is clad in a long, flowing gown and holds in her right hand a hammer, resting atop an anvil, as seen on the minor coins. Behind her is again Mt. Mayon, an almost perfectly conical volcanic mountain southeast of the capital city of Manila. These designs are credited to Filipino sculptor Melecio Figueroa, who lived just long enough to see his coins enter circulation.)	The coat of arms of the Commonwealth of the Philippines. Around this appeared the legend UNITED STATES OF AMERICA, the mint mark, and the date of coinage.	3,500,000; 3,750,000; 2,500,000; 31,592,000; 137,208,000	1937 M 1938 M 1941 M 1944 D 1945 D
		20 centavos	20 mm	1.9 mm	4 g	75% Silver 25% Copper	Reeded	The standing figure of an adolescent female was utilized. She is clad in a long, flowing gown and holds in her right hand a hammer, resting atop an anvil, as seen on the minor coins. Behind her is again Mt. Mayon, an almost perfectly conical volcanic mountain southeast of the capital city of Manila. The statement of value appears above her (Ten, Twenty, and/or Fifty Centavos) in English, while the name of the archipelago is written below in Spanish as FILIPINAS.	The coat of arms of the Commonwealth of the Philippines. Around this appeared the legend UNITED STATES OF AMERICA, the mint mark, and the date of coinage.	2,665,000; 3,000,000; 1,500,000; 28,596,000; 82,804,000	1937 M 1938 M 1941 M 1944 D 1945 D
		50 centavos	27.5 mm		10 g	75% Silver 25% Copper	Reeded	The standing figure of an adolescent female was utilized. She is clad in a long, flowing gown and holds in her right hand a hammer, resting atop an anvil, as seen on the minor coins. Behind her is again Mt. Mayon, an almost perfectly conical volcanic mountain southeast of the capital city of Manila. The statement of value appears above her (Ten, Twenty, and/or Fifty Centavos) in English, while the name of the archipelago is written below in Spanish as FILIPINAS.	The coat of arms of the Commonwealth of the Philippines. Around this appeared the legend UNITED STATES OF AMERICA, the mint mark, and the date of coinage.	19,187,000; 18,120,000	1944 S 1945 S

=== Commonwealth Commemorative Issues ===
Commonwealth Commemorative Issues
Image		Face Value	Technical parameters				Description			Total Mintage	Years of Issue
Obverse	Reverse	Face Value	Diameter	Thickness	Mass	Composition	Edge	Obverse	Reverse	Total Mintage	Years of Issue
		50 centavos	27.5 mm	# mm	10.000	0.7500 Silver	Reeded	description	Busts of Murphy and Quezon	20,000	1936 M
		1 Peso	35 mm	# mm	20.000g	0.9000 Silver	Reeded	description	Busts of Murphy and Quezon	10,000	1936 M
		1 Peso	35 mm	# mm	20.000g	0.9000 Silver	Reeded	description	Busts of Roosevelt and Quezon	10,000	1936 M

=== English series ===
In 1958, a new, entirely base metal coinage was introduced, consisting of bronze 1 centavo, brass 5 centavos and nickel-brass 10, 25 and 50 centavos. This series was demonetized after August 31, 1979, except for the 10-centavo that was demonetized only after January 2, 1998.

English Series
Image		Face Value	Technical parameters				Description			Total Mintage	Date of	
Obverse	Reverse	Face Value	Diameter	Thickness	Mass	Composition	Edge	Obverse	Reverse	Total Mintage	issue	demonetization
		1¢	18.5 mm		2.5 g	Bronze	Plain	Figure of a man seated beside an anvil holding a hammer and Mt. Mayon, year of minting	Bank title and coat of arms		July 1, 1958	August 31, 1979
		5¢	20.0 mm		3.7 g	Brass	Plain	Figure of a man seated beside an anvil holding a hammer and Mt. Mayon, year of minting	Bank title and coat of arms		July 1, 1958	August 31, 1979
		10¢	17.5 mm		2.05 g	Nickel-brass	Reeded	Lady Liberty striking an anvil with a hammer and Mt. Mayon, year of minting	Bank title and coat of arms		July 1, 1958	January 2, 1998
		25¢	23.5 mm		4.8 g	Nickel-brass	Reeded	Lady Liberty striking an anvil with a hammer and Mt. Mayon, year of minting	Bank title and coat of arms		July 1, 1958	August 31, 1979
		50¢	30.0 mm		10.3 g	Nickel-brass	Reeded	Lady Liberty striking an anvil with a hammer and Mt. Mayon, year of minting	Bank title and coat of arms		July 1, 1958	August 31, 1979

=== Pilipino series ===
In 1967, the coinage was altered to reflect the use of Filipino names for the currency units. 1-piso coins were reintroduced in 1972. The series was demonetized after January 2, 1998.

Pilipino Series
Image		Face Value	Technical parameters			Description			Year of	
Image		Face Value	Diameter	Mass	Composition	Edge	Obverse	Reverse	Year of	
Obverse	Reverse	Face Value	Diameter	Mass	Composition	Edge	Obverse	Reverse	first minting	demonetization
		1¢	15.21 mm	0.50 g	Aluminum	Plain	Lapulapu	State title, coat of arms, year of minting	May 5, 1967	January 2, 1998
		5¢	18.0 mm	1.7 g	Brass	Plain	Melchora Aquino	State title, coat of arms, year of minting	May 5, 1967	January 2, 1998
		10¢	17.5 mm	1.98 g	Nickel-brass	Reeded	Francisco Baltazar	State title, coat of arms, year of minting	May 5, 1967	January 2, 1998
		25¢	21.0 mm	4 g	Nickel-brass	Reeded	Juan Luna	State title, coat of arms, year of minting	May 5, 1967	January 2, 1998
		50¢	27.0 mm	7 g	Nickel-brass	Reeded	Marcelo H. del Pilar	State title, coat of arms, year of minting	May 5, 1967	January 2, 1998
		₱1	33.0 mm	15 g	Nickel-brass	Reeded	José Rizal	State title, coat of arms, year of minting between the words "BANGKO" and "SENTRAL"	February 6, 1972	January 2, 1998

=== Ang Bagong Lipunan series ===
In 1975, the Ang Bagong Lipunan (The New Society) series, was introduced with ₱5 coins included for this series. Cupro-nickel replaced nickel-brass that year. The series was demonetized after January 2, 1998.This series is special because it also includes special shaped coins, but only apply for the 1 and 5 sentimo coins.

Ang Bagong Lipunan Series
Image		Face Value	Technical parameters			Description			Year of	
Image		Face Value	Diameter	Mass	Composition	Edge	Obverse	Reverse	Year of	
Obverse	Reverse	Face Value	Diameter	Mass	Composition	Edge	Obverse	Reverse	first minting	demonetization
		1¢	16.5 mm (length of side of rounded square shaped edge)	1.22 g	Aluminum	Plain	State title, Lapulapu, value	"ANG BAGONG LIPUNAN," BSP logo, year of minting	March 31, 1975	January 2, 1998
		5¢	19 mm (8-pointed rounded scallop edge)	2.40g	Brass	Plain	State title, Melchora Aquino, value	"ANG BAGONG LIPUNAN," BSP logo, year of minting	March 31, 1975	January 2, 1998
		10¢	17.5 mm	2g	Cupro-Nickel	Reeded	State title, Francisco Baltazar, value	"ANG BAGONG LIPUNAN," BSP logo, year of minting	March 31, 1975	January 2, 1998
		25¢	21.0 mm	4g	Cupro-Nickel	Reeded	State title, Juan Luna, value	"ANG BAGONG LIPUNAN," BSP logo, year of minting	March 31, 1975	January 2, 1998
		₱1	29 mm	9.5g	Cupro-Nickel	Reeded	State title, José Rizal, value	"ANG BAGONG LIPUNAN," coat of arms with the scroll text altered to "ISANG BANSA, ISANG DIWA" ("One Nation, One Spirit") with two digits of the year minted on both sides, bank title	March 31, 1975	January 2, 1998
		₱5	36.5 mm	22g	Nickel	Plain	"ANG BAGONG LIPUNAN," "Setyembre 21, 1972" ("September 21, 1972"), Ferdinand Marcos, year of minting	State title, coat of arms with the scroll text altered to "ISANG BANSA, ISANG DIWA" ("One Nation, One Spirit")	March 31, 1975	January 2, 1998

=== Flora and Fauna series ===
The Flora and Fauna series was introduced in 1983 which included ₱2 coins. This series used the Optima typeface. The reduced-size 25-sentimo, 50-sentimo, ₱1 and ₱2 coins were distributed and ₱5 coins was reintroduced starting April 1, 1991. Production of 50-sentimo and ₱2 coins ceased in 1995. The main coins and the commemorative coins associated with the original 1983 larger ₱1 and ₱2 coins were demonetized on January 2, 1998, and May 1, 2020, respectively, making the series had a liability of the Bangko Sentral ng Pilipinas (BSP) for 37 years from September 30, 1983, to May 2020.

The Flora and Fauna series had an error for some coins, in 1983. The text for 10 centavos for scientific name of the Philippine goby was "Pandaka pygmea" instead of "Pandaka pygmaea" and the 50 centavo coin for the Philippine eagle was "Pithecobhaga jefferyi" instead of "Pithecophaga jefferyi".

Flora and Fauna Series (1983–2020)
Image		Face Value	Technical parameters				Description			Year of	
Image		Face Value	Diameter	Thickness	Mass	Composition	Edge	Obverse	Reverse	Year of	
Obverse	Reverse	Face Value	Diameter	Thickness	Mass	Composition	Edge	Obverse	Reverse	Introduction	Demonetization
		1¢	15.5 mm	1.67mm	0.70 g	Aluminum and Magnesium; 99.2% Al; 0.8% Mg	Plain	State title, Lapulapu, year of minting	Voluta imperialis, Value	September 30, 1983	January 2, 1998
		5¢	17.0 mm	2.08mm	1.20 g	Aluminum and Magnesium; 99.2% Al; 0.8% Mg	Plain	State title, Melchora Aquino, year of minting	Vanda sanderiana (Waling-waling), Value	September 30, 1983	January 2, 1998
		10¢	19.0 mm	2.3mm	1.50 g	Aluminum and Magnesium; 99.2% Al; 0.8% Mg	Plain	State title, Francisco Baltazar, value, year of minting	Pandaka pygmaea (Philippine Goby), Value	September 30, 1983	January 2, 1998
		25¢	21.0 mm	1.68mm	3.9 g	Brass (65% copper; 35% zinc)	Reeded	State title, Juan Luna, year of minting	Graphium idaeoides, Value	September 30, 1983	January 2, 1998
		50¢	25.0 mm	1.62mm	6 g	Copper-nickel; 75% Cu; 25% Ni	Plain	State title, Marcelo H. del Pilar, year of minting	Pithecophaga jefferyi (Philippine Eagle), Value	September 30, 1983	January 2, 1998
		₱1	29.0 mm	1.9mm	9.5 g	Copper-nickel; 75% Cu; 25% Ni	Reeded	State title, José Rizal, year of minting	Anoa mindorensis (Tamaraw), Value	September 30, 1983 (regular issue); 1989 (commemorative coins)	January 2, 1998 (regular issue); May 1, 2020 (commemorative coins)
		₱2	31 mm (across corners, decagon); 29.8 mm (across flats, decagon)	2mm	12 g	Copper-nickel; 75% Cu; 25% Ni	Plain	State title, Andrés Bonifacio, year of minting	Cocos nucifera (Coconut Tree), Value	September 30, 1983 (regular issue); 1990 (commemorative coins)	January 2, 1998 (regular issue); May 1, 2020 (commemorative coins)
Improved Flora and Fauna Series (1991–2020)
		25¢	16.0 mm	1.4mm	2.24 g	Brass	Plain	State title, Juan Luna, year of minting	Graphium idaeoides, Value	April 1, 1991	January 2, 1998
		50¢	18 mm	1.5mm	3 g	Brass	Reeded	State title, Marcelo H. del Pilar, year of minting	Pithecophaga jefferyi (Philippine Eagle), Value	April 1, 1991	January 2, 1998
		₱1	21.6 mm	1.7mm	4 g	Stainless steel	Plain	State title, José Rizal, year of minting	Anoa mindorensis (Tamaraw), Value	April 1, 1991 (regular issue); 1992 (commemorative coins)	January 2, 1998 (regular issue); May 1, 2020 (commemorative coins)
		₱2	23.5 mm	1.8 mm	5 g	Stainless steel	Reeded	State title, Andrés Bonifacio, year of minting	Cocos nucifera (Coconut Tree), Value	April 1, 1991 (regular issue); 1992 (commemorative coins)	January 2, 1998 (regular issue); May 1, 2020 (commemorative coins)
		₱5	25.5 mm	2.6mm	9.45 g	Nickel-brass	Reeded	State title, Emilio Aguinaldo, year of minting	Pterocarpus indicus (Narra), Value	April 1, 1991 (regular issue); June 7, 1992 (commemorative coins)	January 2, 1998 (regular issue); May 1, 2020 (commemorative coins)

== Circulating coins ==
=== BSP Coin series ===
In June 1995, a new set of coins and notes was issued, which carried the new logo of the BSP: 5- and 1-piso and 25-, 10-, 5- and 1-sentimo, with the aim of carrying out the demonetization of all previous series on January 3, 1998, and also to replace the 5-piso NDS banknote. In 2000, BSP issued the 10-piso coin to commemorate the new millennium and later to the general circulation on July 16, 2001, for BSP's 8th anniversary. It has the profiles of Andres Bonifacio and Apolinario Mabini in a con-joint or in tandem manner on the obverse side. The reverse side bears the seal of the Bangko Sentral ng Pilipinas, which is consistent with the common reverse design of the other six denominations. This has been an additional denomination to the current coin circulation and a replacement for the 10-piso NDS note. Like with its predecessor Flora and Fauna Series, it also used the Optima typeface.

Some coins from 1995 to 1998 had no mint marks and those were minted by the Royal Canadian Mint, but coins issued from 1999 onward all have mint marks. However, not all 1995–1998 coins were minted by the Royal Canadian Mint, coins with mint mark during the three-year period were minted by the BSP.

BSP Coin Series (1995–2017)
Image		Face Value	Technical parameters				Description			Years of Issue	
Obverse	Reverse	Face Value	Diameter	Mass	Composition	Edge Thickness	Edge	Obverse	Reverse	Introduced	Withdrawn
		1¢	15.5 mm	2.0 g	Copper-plated steel	1.50 mm	Plain	"Republika ng Pilipinas", value, year of minting	1993 Logo of the Bangko Sentral ng Pilipinas	June 1995	
		5¢	15.5 mm	1.9 g	Copper-plated steel	1.50 mm	Plain (with 4 mm central hole)	"Republika ng Pilipinas", value, year of minting	Words "Bangko Sentral ng Pilipinas" along the border	June 1995	
		10¢	17.0 mm	2.5 g	Copper-plated steel	1.55 mm	Reeded	"Republika ng Pilipinas", value, year of minting	1993 Logo of the Bangko Sentral ng Pilipinas	June 1995	
		25¢	20.0 mm	3.8 g	Brass	1.65 mm	Plain	"Republika ng Pilipinas", value, year of minting	1993 Logo of the Bangko Sentral ng Pilipinas	June 1995	
		25¢	20.0 mm	3.6 g	Brass-plated steel	1.65 mm	Plain	"Republika ng Pilipinas", value, year of minting	1993 Logo of the Bangko Sentral ng Pilipinas	2003	
		₱1	24.0 mm	6.1 g	Copper-nickel	1.85 mm	Reeded	"Republika ng Pilipinas", Profile of José Rizal, value, year of minting	1993 Logo of the Bangko Sentral ng Pilipinas	June 1995	
		₱1	24.0 mm	5.35 g	Nickel-plated steel	1.85 mm	Reeded	"Republika ng Pilipinas", Profile of José Rizal, value, year of minting	1993 Logo of the Bangko Sentral ng Pilipinas	April 21, 2003	
		₱5	27.0 mm	7.7 g	Nickel-brass (70% copper 5.5% nickel 24.5% zinc)	1.90 mm	Plain	12-pointed scallop border design, "Republika ng Pilipinas", Profile of Emilio Aguinaldo, value, year of minting	12-pointed scallop border design, 1993 Logo of the Bangko Sentral ng Pilipinas	June 1995	
		₱10	26.5 mm	8.7 g	Ring: Copper-nickel	2.10 mm	Segmented (Plain and Reeded edges)	Ring: "Republika ng Pilipinas", year of minting	1993 Logo of the Bangko Sentral ng Pilipinas	2000	
		₱10	26.5 mm	8.7 g	Center: Aluminum-bronze	2.10 mm	Segmented (Plain and Reeded edges)	Center: Profiles of Andrés Bonifacio and Apolinario Mabini, value	1993 Logo of the Bangko Sentral ng Pilipinas	2000	

=== New Generation Currency Coin series ===
On November 30, 2017, the Bangko Sentral ng Pilipinas introduced the New Generation Currency Coin Series which was circulated through banks the next day. The new series features native Philippine flora. Sentimo denominated coins depict a stylized representation of the Philippine flag on the obverse. Peso denominated coins depict the portraits of renowned national heroes of the Philippines on the obverse. However, the 10-sentimo coin is not included in this series, because it was removed as a general circulation coin. This series uses the Twentieth Century and the Arial typeface (20 peso coin only).

In July 2019, the BSP announced plans to replace the ₱20 bill with a ₱20 coin by the 1st quarter of 2020.

In September 2019, Benjamin Diokno (the current BSP Governor) finally came up on having a solution for the ₱5 coin that is always confused with the current ₱1 coins, the new ₱5 coin that will be minted will have a nonagonal shape. Also, the ₱20 coin was finally designed in the same month and both coins were released on December 17, 2019.

New Generation Currency series
Image		Face Value	Technical parameters				Description			Introduced
Obverse	Reverse	Face Value	Diameter	Mass	Edge Thickness	Composition	Edge	Obverse	Reverse	Introduced
		1¢	15 mm	1.90 g	1.54 mm	Nickel-plated steel	Plain	"Republika ng Pilipinas"; Three stars and the sun (stylized representation of the Philippine flag); Value; Year of minting; Mint mark	Xanthostemon verdugonianus (Mangkono); logo of the Bangko Sentral ng Pilipinas	November 30, 2017
		5¢	16 mm	2.20 g	1.60 mm	Nickel-plated steel	Reeded	"Republika ng Pilipinas"; Three stars and the sun (stylized representation of the Philippine flag); Value; Year of minting; Mint mark	Hoya pubicalyx (Kapal-kapal Baging); logo of the Bangko Sentral ng Pilipinas	November 30, 2017
		25¢	20 mm	3.60 g	1.65 mm	Nickel-plated steel	Plain	"Republika ng Pilipinas"; Three stars and the sun (stylized representation of the Philippine flag); Value; Year of minting; Mint mark	Dillenia philippinensis (Katmon); logo of the Bangko Sentral ng Pilipinas	November 30, 2017
		₱ 1	23 mm	6.00 g	2.05 mm	Nickel-plated steel	Segmented (Plain and Reeded edges)	"Republika ng Pilipinas"; Portrait of José Rizal; Value; Year of minting; Mint mark	Vanda sanderiana (Waling-waling); logo of the Bangko Sentral ng Pilipinas	November 30, 2017
		₱ 5	25 mm	7.40 g	2.20 mm	Nickel-plated steel	Plain	"Republika ng Pilipinas"; Portrait of Andrés Bonifacio; Value; Microprint of "Republika ng Pilipinas"; Year of minting; Mint mark	Strongylodon macrobotrys (Tayabak); logo of the Bangko Sentral ng Pilipinas; Microprint of "Bangko Sentral ng Pilipinas"	November 30, 2017
		₱ 5 (nonagonal shape)	25 mm	7.40 g	2.20 mm	Nickel-plated steel	Plain	"Republika ng Pilipinas"; Portrait of Andrés Bonifacio; Value; Microprint of "Republika ng Pilipinas"; Year of minting; Mint mark	Strongylodon macrobotrys (Tayabak); logo of the Bangko Sentral ng Pilipinas; Microprint of "Bangko Sentral ng Pilipinas"	December 17, 2019
		₱ 10	27 mm	8.00 g	2.05 mm	Nickel-plated steel	Reeded with edge inscription of "BANGKO SENTRAL NG PILIPINAS" in italics	"Republika ng Pilipinas"; Portrait of Apolinario Mabini; Value; Microprint of "Republika ng Pilipinas"; Year of minting; Mint mark	Medinilla magnifica (Kapa-kapa); logo of the Bangko Sentral ng Pilipinas; Microprint of "Bangko Sentral ng Pilipinas"; Microdots	November 30, 2017
		₱20	30 mm	11.50 g	2.10 mm	Ring: bronze-plated steel	Plain edge with inscription of "BSP" at six angles	Ring: "Republika ng Pilipinas"	Scyphiphora hydrophylacea (Nilad); logo of the Bangko Sentral ng Pilipinas; Malacañang Palace; Microprint of "Bangko Sentral ng Pilipinas"	December 17, 2019
		₱20	30 mm	11.50 g	2.10 mm	Center: nickel-plated steel	Plain edge with inscription of "BSP" at six angles	Center: Portrait of Manuel Quezon; Value; Microprint of "Republika ng Pilipinas"; Year of minting; Mint mark	Scyphiphora hydrophylacea (Nilad); logo of the Bangko Sentral ng Pilipinas; Malacañang Palace; Microprint of "Bangko Sentral ng Pilipinas"	December 17, 2019

=== Current legal tender commemorative coins ===
On December 9, 2011, the Bangko Sentral ng Pilipinas issued a commemorative one-peso coin in celebration of the 150th Birth Anniversary of José Rizal. The coins are in the same dimensions as the circulating one peso coins with Rizal's face from the front instead of in profile. The new coin also has the new logo of the central bank and is legal tender with the current series.

On December 18, 2013, the Bangko Sentral ng Pilipinas issued a commemorative ten-peso coin in celebration of the 150th Birth Anniversary of Andres Bonifacio. The coins are in the same dimensions but the design changed. These also featured the new logo of the central bank and is also legal tender.

On December 22, 2014, the BSP issued three commemorative coins, a five-peso coin to commemorate the 70th Anniversary of the Leyte Gulf Landings, a five-peso coin honoring Overseas Filipinos with the theme "Bagong Bayani" and a ten-peso coin celebrating the 150th Anniversary of the birth of Apolinario Mabini.

On January 14, 2015, the BSP issued two limited edition commemorative coins for the papal visit of Pope Francis, a 50-peso coin made of nickel-brass steel and a 500-peso coin made of Nordic gold with gold plating. A special logo with the theme "Mercy and Compassion" was minted on the reverse side of both coins, following the Pope's papal bull of indiction proclaimed later that year to mark the Extraordinary Jubilee of Mercy. The coins are minted under a licensing agreement with the Vatican. Both coins are legal tender. Production and issuance of two additional silver and gold coins in 1000-peso and 10,000-peso denominations were called off due to limitations in the procurement process.

On December 21, 2015, the BSP issued a commemorative 10-peso coin in honor of General Miguel Malvar, in time for the 150th year birth anniversary.

On January 27, 2017, the BSP issued a commemorative one-peso coin in honor of the Philippines' Chairmanship of the Association of Southeast Asian Nations (ASEAN).

In August and November 2017, the BSP issued commemorative one-peso coins and 10-peso coin both honoring the 100th anniversary of the birth of educator and historian Horacio de la Costa and the 150th anniversary of the birth of three officers of the Philippine Revolutionary Army, Generals Artemio Ricarte, Isidoro Torres and Antonio Luna.

On March 11, 2022, the BSP issued a commemorative 125-peso coin to honor the 125th martyrdom anniversary of Dr. Jose Rizal.

On June 10, 2026, the BSP issued a commemorative 125-peso coin to mark the 125th anniversary of the Supreme Court of the Philippines.

Current legal tender commemorative coins
Image	Value	Diameter	Weight	Composition	Edge	Obverse	Reverse	First Minted Year
	₱1	24.0 mm	5.35 g	Nickel-plated steel	Reeded	"Republika ng Pilipinas", Profile of José Rizal, "150 Years", "1861-2011"	Logo of the Bangko Sentral ng Pilipinas with a facade of the sun, value, year of minting	December 9, 2011
	₱1	24.0 mm	5.35 g	Nickel-plated steel	Reeded	"Republika ng Pilipinas", Profile of Artemio Ricarte, "Heneral Artemio Ricarte", "150 Years"	Logo of the Bangko Sentral ng Pilipinas, value, year of minting	August 24, 2017
	₱1	24.0 mm	5.35 g	Nickel-plated steel	Reeded	"Republika ng Pilipinas", Profile of Isidro Torres, "Heneral Isidro Torres", "150 Years"	Logo of the Bangko Sentral ng Pilipinas, value, year of minting	August 24, 2017
	₱1	24.0 mm	5.35 g	Nickel-plated steel	Reeded	"Republika ng Pilipinas", Profile of Horacio De la Costa, "Rev. Horacio De la Costa", "100 Years"	Logo of the Bangko Sentral ng Pilipinas, value, year of minting	August 24, 2017
	₱1	24.0 mm	5.35 g	Nickel-plated steel	Reeded	"Partnering for Change, Engaging the World"; "ASEAN 50"; "Philippines 2017"; the sun from the flag of the Philippines with dove and emblem of the Association of Southeast Asian Nations (ASEAN); names of the members of the Association of Southeast Asian Nations (ASEAN) in microtext	Monument of José Rizal at Rizal Park; "Republika ng Pilipinas"; "1 Piso"; logo of the Bangko Sentral ng Pilipinas; names of the members of the Association of Southeast Asian Nations (ASEAN); microtext	January 20, 2017
	₱5	27.0 mm	7.7 g	Nickel-brass	Plain	"Republika ng Pilipinas", profile of Filipinos of various professions, "Bagong Bayani"	Date of issue, passenger jet, logo of the Bangko Sentral ng Pilipinas, a Filipino family, denomination	March 3, 2014
	₱5	27.0 mm	7.7 g	Nickel-brass	Plain	"Leyte Gulf Landing", scene of the landing, "70th Anniversary", "1944-2014"	"I have returned. By the grace of Almighty God our forces stand again on Philippine soil - soil consecrated from the blood of our two peoples.", five stars denoting the rank of field marshal, date and signature of Douglas MacArthur, logo of the Bangko Sentral ng Pilipinas, denomination	September 30, 2014
	₱10	26.5 mm	8.7 g	Bi-metallic (Copper nickel outer ring with an aluminum bronze center plug)	Segmented	"Republika ng Pilipinas", Profile of Andres Bonifacio	Monument of Andres Bonifacio, "Dangal at Kabayanihan", signature of Andres Bonifacio, logo of the Bangko Sentral ng Pilipinas, "150 Years", "1863-2013"	November 22, 2013
	₱10	26.5 mm	8.7 g	Bi-metallic (Copper nickel outer ring with an aluminum bronze center plug)	Segmented	"Republika ng Pilipinas", Profile of Apolinario Mabini, quill pen	"Talino at Paninindigan" Monument to Apolinario Mabini, signature of Apolinario Mabini, logo of the Bangko Sentral ng Pilipinas, "150 Taon", "1864-2014"	August 20, 2014
	₱10	26.5 mm	8.7 g	Bi-metallic (Copper nickel outer ring with an aluminum bronze center plug)	Segmented	"Republika ng Pilipinas", portrait and signature of Miguel Malvar, denomination	Logo of the Bangko Sentral ng Pilipinas, figure of Miguel Malvar, "150 Taon", "1865-2015"	September 18, 2015
	₱10	26.5 mm	8.7 g	Bi-metallic (Copper nickel outer ring with an aluminum bronze center plug)	Segmented	"Republika ng Pilipinas", portrait and signature of Antonio Luna, denomination	Logo of the Bangko Sentral ng Pilipinas, figure of Antonio Luna, "DANGAL, TAPANG, DIGNIDAD" text, "150 Taon", "1866-2016"	November 24, 2017
	₱50	27 mm	7.7 g	Nickel-brass	Plain	"Republika ng Pilipinas", portrait and signature of Pope Francis, denomination, year of minting, BSP mint mark	Logo of the Bangko Sentral ng Pilipinas, "Papal Visit/Philippines", date of visit "January 15–19, 2015", logo of the Papal Visit 2015, mini letters "Mercy and Compassion"	January 14, 2015
	₱125	34 mm	15 g	Nordic gold	Reeded	"Martyrdom of Jose Rizal", portrait and signature Jose Rizal, "125 years", BSP mint mark	Logo of the Bangko Sentral ng Pilipinas, "Republika ng Pilipinas", denomination, mini letters, Rizal Monument	March 11, 2022
	₱125	34 mm	15 g	Nordic gold	Reeded	Logo of the Bangko Sentral ng Pilipinas, Logo of the Supreme Court of the Philippines, "Republika ng Pilipinas", denomination, statue of Lady Justice, BSP mint mark	"Supreme Court of the Philippines", "1901 to 2026", facade of the Supreme Court new building, "125", "Tradition and Innovation"	June 10, 2026
	₱500	34 mm	15 g	Nordic gold	Reeded	"Republika ng Pilipinas", portrait and signature of Pope Francis, denomination, year of minting, BSP mint mark	Logo of the Bangko Sentral ng Pilipinas, "Papal Visit/Philippines, date of visit "January 15–19, 2015", logo of the Papal Visit 2015, mini letters "Mercy and Compassion"	January 14, 2015

== Summary of the Philippine coin series ==
Summary of the Philippine coin series
Series/Value	1¢	5¢	10¢	25¢	50¢	₱1	₱2	₱5	₱10	₱20
English Series						not introduced until 1972	not introduced until 1983	not introduced until 1975	not introduced until 2001	not introduced until 2019
Pilipino Series							not introduced until 1983	not introduced until 1975	not introduced until 2001	not introduced until 2019
Ang Bagong Lipunan Series					—		not introduced until 1983		not introduced until 2001	not introduced until 2019
Flora and Fauna Series								—	not introduced until 2001	not introduced until 2019
Improved Flora and Fauna Series	—	—	—						not introduced until 2001	not introduced until 2019
BSP Series					ended production since 1994		ended production since 1994			not introduced until 2019
New Generation Currency Series			ended production since 2017		ended production since 1994		ended production since 1994			
