= Palo de hierro =

Palo de hierro is Spanish for "iron wood". It is the common name of the following species:

- Sacoglottis holdridgei, also known as huriki, a tree endemic to Cocos Island in Costa Rica
- Xanthostemon verdugonianus, also known as mangkono or Philippine ironwood, a tree endemic to the Philippines
