= Philippine one-centavo coin =

Current lowest-value Philippine coin

One sentimo
- Philippines
- Value: 0.01 Philippine peso
- Mass: 1.90 g
- Diameter: 15 mm
- Thickness: 1.54 mm
- Edge: Plain
- Composition: Nickel-plated steel
- Years of minting: 1903–present

Obverse
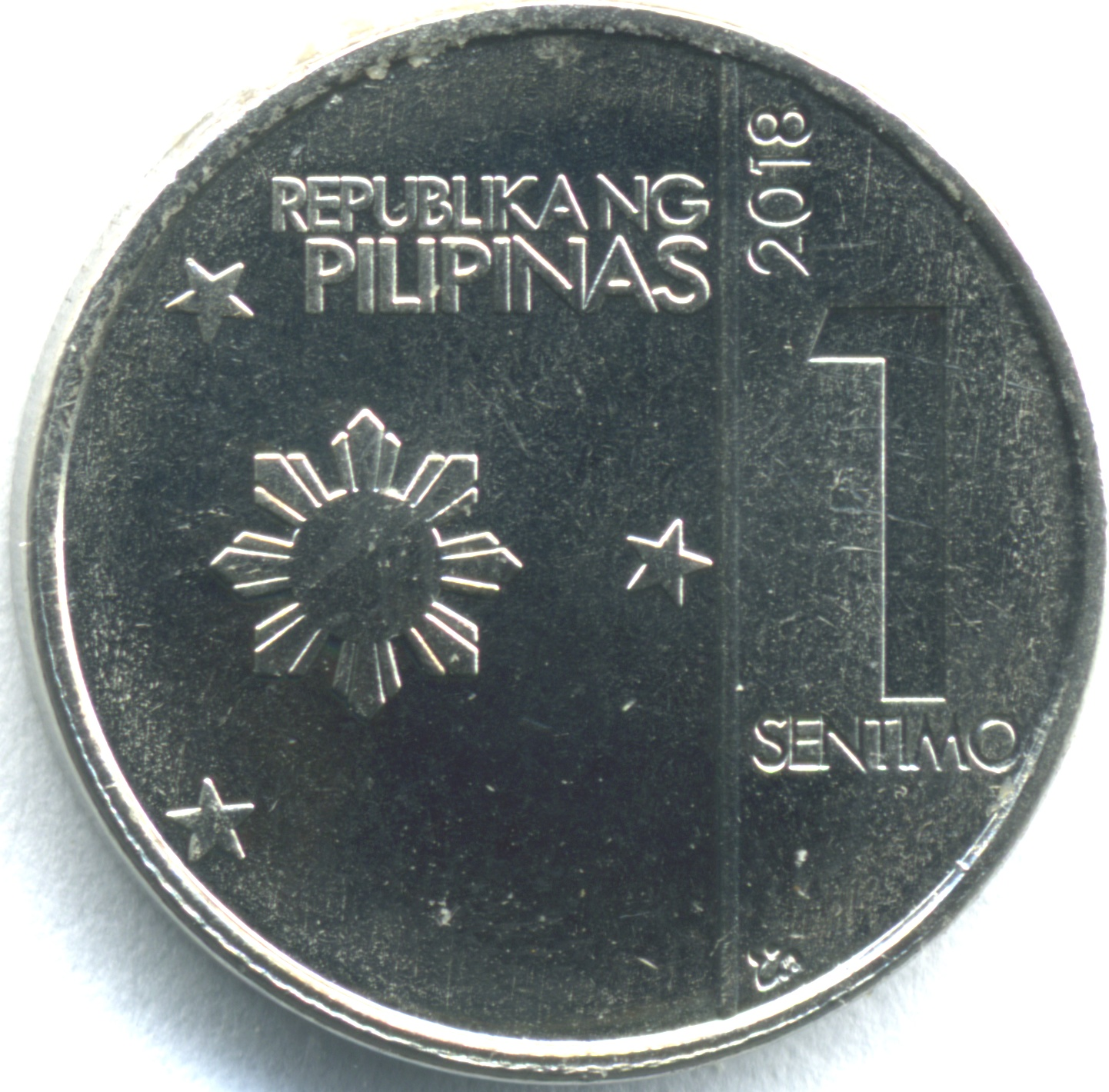
- Design: "Republika ng Pilipinas"; Three stars and the sun (stylized representation of the Philippine flag); Value; Year of minting; Mint mark
- Design date: 2018

Reverse
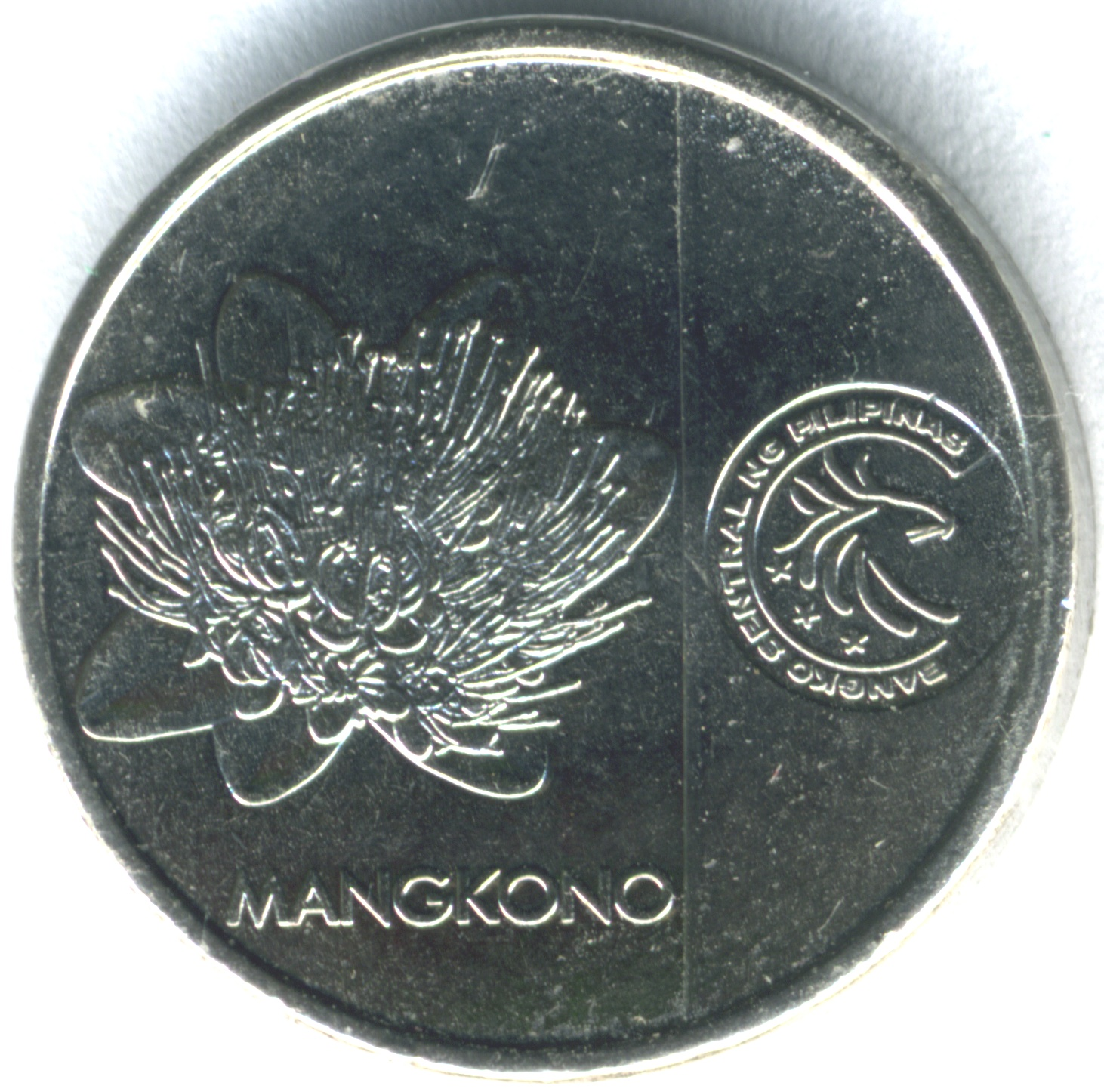
- Design: Xanthostemon verdugonianus (Mangkono); logo of the Bangko Sentral ng Pilipinas
- Design date: 2018

The one-sentimo coin (1¢) is the smallest-denomination coin of the Philippine peso. It has been issued since 1903 during American rule. It became the smallest unit of currency following the removal of the half-centavo in 1908.

In Filipino, the one-centavo coin is referred to as isang sentimo, mamera, or sampera. Mamera, in particular, is a slang term for something very cheap, as it represents a value of only one centavo.

== History ==
=== Pre-independence ===
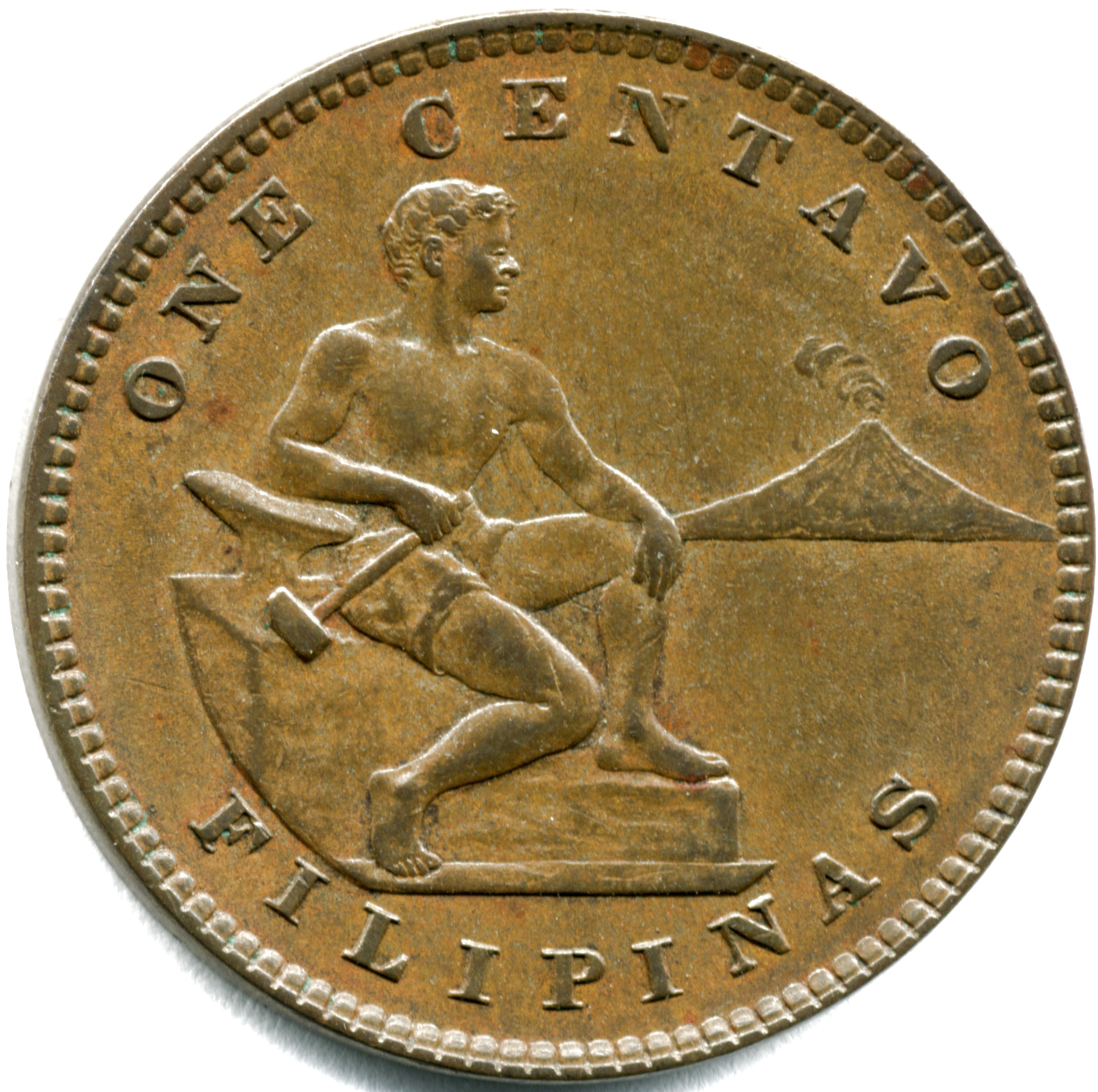
1-centavo coin issued 1903-1945

No coins worth one hundredth of a peso were issued during the Spanish rule over the Philippines, as the 10 centimo was the smallest unit of currency of the Philippine peso fuerte (1861-1898). The centimo was recognized, though, as an accounting unit worth 1/100 of a peso. In 1897 Spain brought 5 and 10 centimos de peseta coins for use in the Philippines as 1 and 2 centimos de peso.

The first one-centavo coin was issued under American rule in 1903. It featured an Islander near a volcano on the obverse with 'One Centavo' written on the top and 'Filipinas' on the bottom. The reverse featured the American coat of arms with the inscription 'United States of America' on the top and the date on the bottom. This coin was minted until 1936, the next year it featured a change on the reverse with a Filipino coat of arms. This second coin was minted until 1944.

=== Independence ===
==== English Series ====
In 1958, minting of the centavo resumed with another coat of arms on the reverse. The inscription around the coat of arms was changed to 'Central Bank of the Philippines'.

==== Pilipino Series ====
In 1967 the coin featured the Tagalog language for the first time and its composition changed to a silver-colour. Its obverse featured Lapu-Lapu, a native chief of Mactan (near Cebu) who fought against Spanish colonization, in profile to the left. The inscription around the shield read 'Republika ng Pilipinas'.

==== Ang Bagong Lipunan Series ====
A second silver-coloured coin featuring Lapu-Lapu was minted from 1975 to 1982 and was squircle. The name of the Republic was moved to the obverse, and Lapu-Lapu now faced right. On the reverse was the inscription 'Ang Bagong Lipunan'. The issues from 1979 to 1982 featured a mintmark underneath the 1 centavo.

==== Flora and Fauna Series ====
From 1983 to 1993 the coin was round, Lapu-Lapu again faced the left in profile, and the denomination was moved to the reverse with the date on the front. The voluta imperialis, a species of sea snail, was also featured on the reverse.

==== BSP Coin Series ====
From its introduction in 1995, the one centavo coin was minted in copper-plated steel, and featured no subject presented. The reverse has the 1993 logo of the Bangko Sentral ng Pilipinas. The name of the republic, the date and denomination are all on the obverse. Of the BSP design of one-centavo coins, only 18 million have been minted, meaning that in comparison to the projected population of 94 million the Philippines in 2010, there are over four people to each one-centavo coin.

==== New Generation Currency Coin Series ====
Issued in 2017, the one centavo coin of the New Generation Currency Coin Series features the stylized representation of the Philippine flag, the three stars and the sun, the name of the republic, the date and denomination on the obverse. The reverse side depicts the Magkono (Xanthostemon verdugonianus) and the current logo of the Bangko Sentral ng Pilipinas.

=== Version history ===
	English Series (1958–1967)	Pilipino Series (1967–1974)	Ang Bagong Lipunan Series (1975–1982)	Flora and Fauna Series (1983–1993)	BSP Coin Series (1995–2017)	New Generation Currency Coin Series (2017–present)
Obverse						
Reverse						
