= Philippine twenty-five-centavo coin =

Philippine coin

Twenty-five sentimo
- Philippines
- Value: 0.25 Philippine peso
- Mass: 3.60 g
- Diameter: 20 mm (0.78 in)
- Thickness: 1.6 mm (0.06 in)
- Edge: Plain
- Composition: Nickel-plated steel
- Years of minting: 1958–present

Obverse
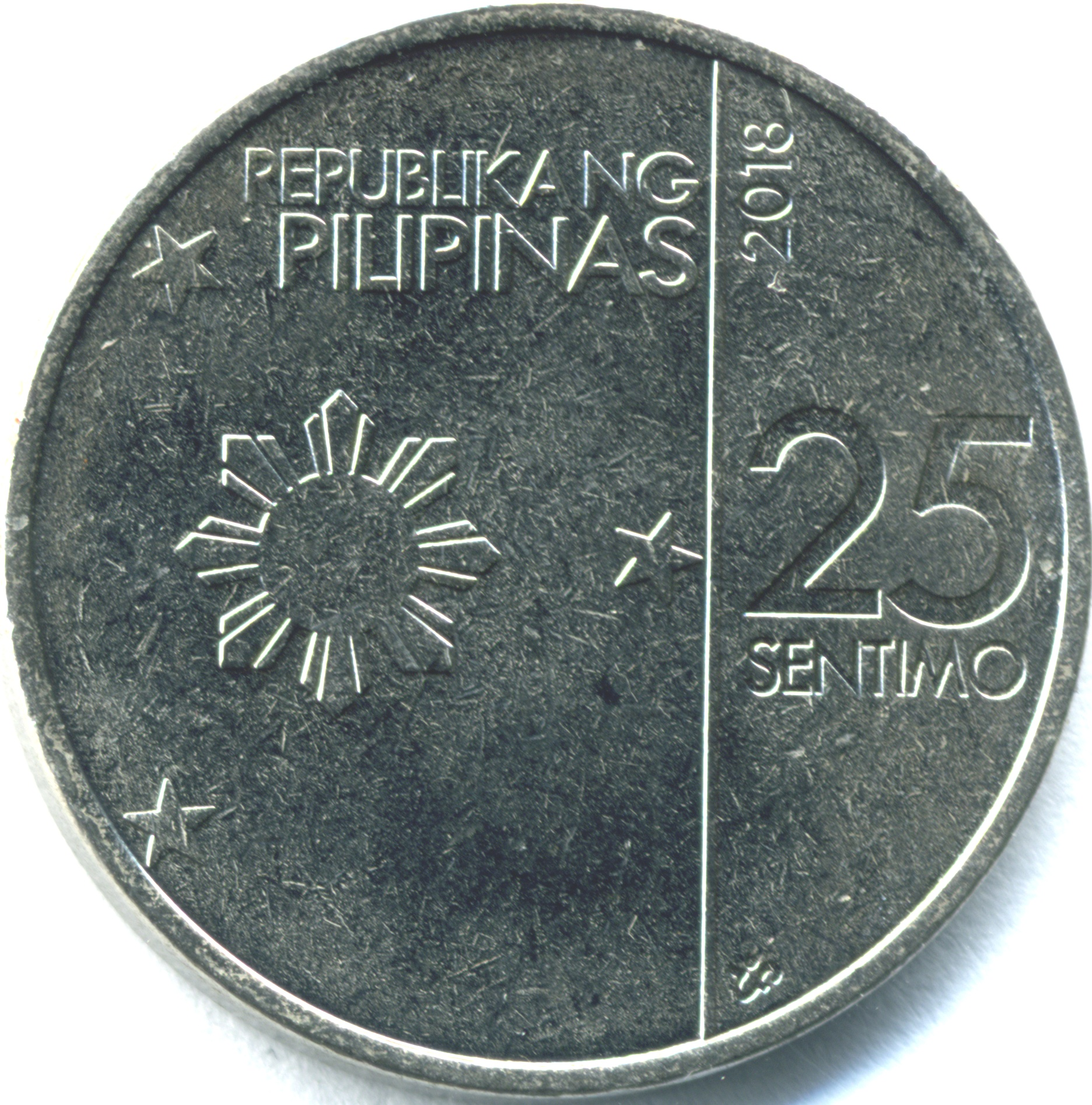
- Design: "Republika ng Pilipinas", Three stars and the sun (stylized representation of the Philippine flag); Value; Year of minting; Mint mark
- Design date: 2017

Reverse
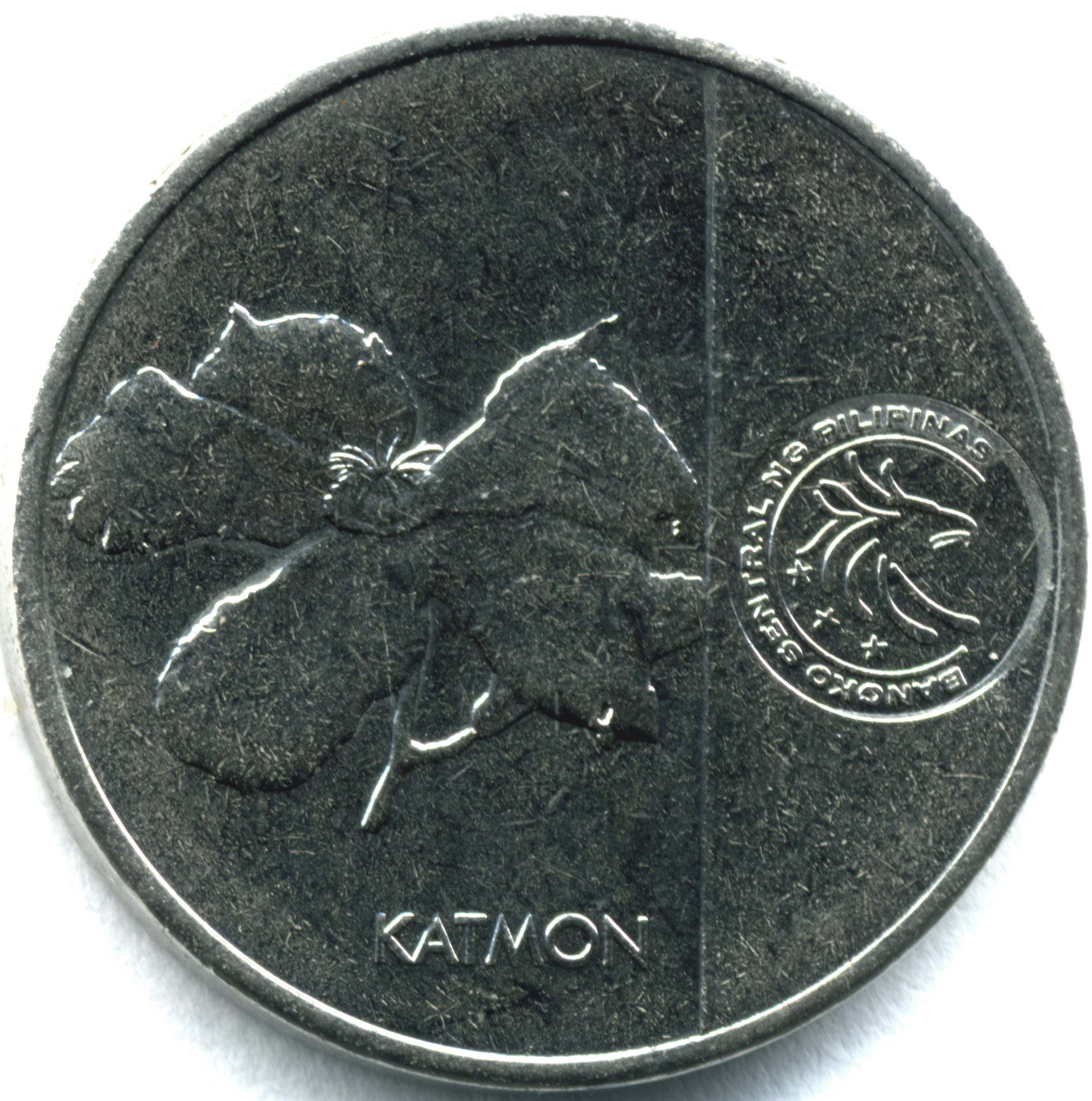
- Design: Dillenia philippinensis (Katmon); logo of the Bangko Sentral ng Pilipinas
- Design date: 2017

The twenty-five-sentimo coin (25¢) is the third-lowest denomination coin of the Philippine peso.

During Spanish administration, coins valued at 1/4 a Spanish dollar (or peso), equivalent to two reales, issued by Spain and Spanish America, were generally accepted in the Philippines as 25 centimos. However, following the release of the 20-centimo coin in 1864, a 25-centimo denomination was not issued until the end of the Spanish and American administrations.

The first coin of independent Philippines to be valued a quarter of a peso was issued in 1958 as twenty-five centavos (the name for the sub-unit under American rule). Its obverse featured a woman near a volcano, with the denomination written in English around the perimeter and the year at the bottom. On the reverse side was the coat of arms of the Philippines, encircled by the inscription 'Central Bank of the Philippines'. The last issue of this coin was in 1966.

== History ==
=== Independence ===
==== English Series ====
In 1958, minting of the centavo resumed with another coat of arms on the reverse. The inscription around the coat of arms was changed to 'Central Bank of the Philippines'.

==== Pilipino Series ====
In 1969, the coin featured the Tagalog language for the first time. Its obverse featured Juan Luna, a Filipino painter, sculptor and a political activist of the Philippine Revolution during the late 19th century, in profile to the left. The inscription around the shield on its reverse read 'Republika ng Pilipinas'.

==== Ang Bagong Lipunan Series ====
A second silver-colored coin featuring Luna was minted from 1975 to 1983. The name of the Republic was moved to the obverse. On the reverse was the inscription 'Ang Bagong Lipunan'. The issues from 1979 to 1982 featured a mintmark underneath the 25 centavo.

==== Flora and Fauna Series ====
From 1983 to 1990, a new brass-colored coin was issued with Luna faced to the right in profile, and the denomination was moved to the reverse with the date on the obverse. The Philippine butterfly (Graphium idaeoides) was also featured on the obverse. The smaller version was minted from 1991 to 1994, and its size continued to be used on its successor BSP series from 1995 to 2017.

==== BSP Coin Series ====
Issued from 1995 to 2003 in brass and from 2003 to 2017 in brass-plated steel, the twenty-five sentimo coin is the same as 1991 version of its predecessor Flora and Fauna series where it featured the name of the republic and date of issue on the reverse, but the portrait of Luna was removed and replaced by the denomination. The reverse side featured the 1993 logo of the Bangko Sentral ng Pilipinas which replaced the butterfly. The BSP mintmark was also moved from left to right.

==== New Generation Currency Coin Series ====
Issued in 2017 and minted in nickel-plated steel, the twenty-five cent coin features a stylized representation of the Philippine flag, the three stars and the sun, the denomination and year of minting on the obverse. The reverse side features the Katmon (Dillenia philippinensis) and the current logo of the Bangko Sentral ng Pilipinas.

=== Version history ===
	English Series (1958–1967)	Pilipino Series (1969–1974)	Ang Bagong Lipunan Series (1975–1983)	Flora and Fauna Series (1983–1990, 1991–1994)	BSP Coin Series (1995–2017)	New Generation Currency Coin Series (2017–present)
Obverse						
Reverse						

Years	Material	Weight (grams)
1958–1967	Nickel-brass	4.8
1967–1975	Nickel-brass	4
1975–1983	Cupronickel	4
1983–1990	Brass	4
1991–1994	Brass	2
1995–2003	Brass	3
2003–2017	Brass-plated steel	3
2017–present	Nickel-plated steel	3
