= Philippine fifty-centavo coin =

Philippine coin made between 1864 and 1994

Fifty centavos
- Philippines
- Value: 0.50 Philippine peso
- Mass: 3.0 g
- Diameter: 17.5 mm
- Edge: Plain (Flora and Fauna Series); Reeded (Improved Flora and Fauna Series)
- Composition: Copper-nickel (1983–1990); Brass (1991–1994)
- Years of minting: 1880–1994

Obverse
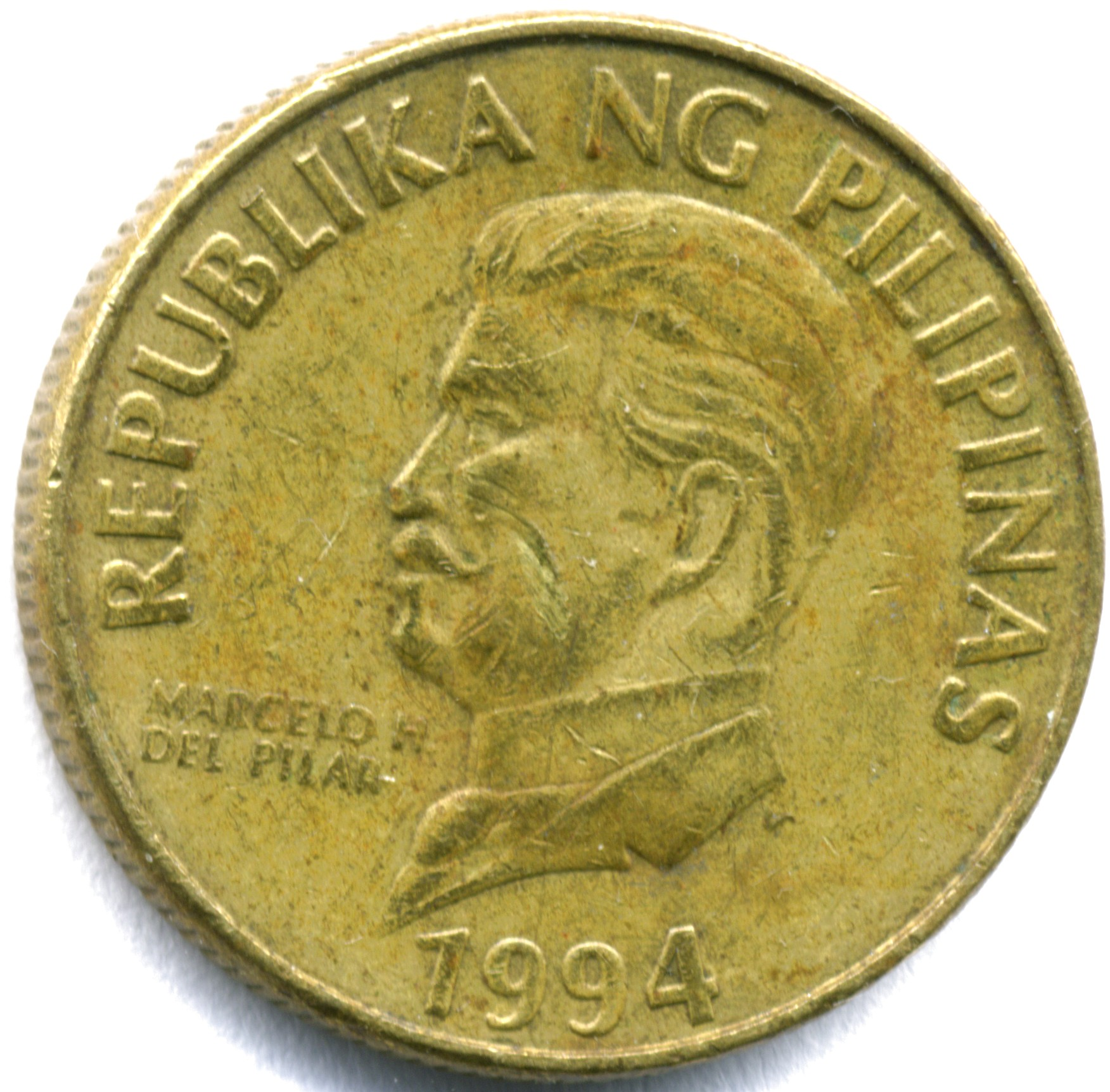
- Design: State title, Marcelo H. del Pilar, year of minting
- Design date: 1991

Reverse
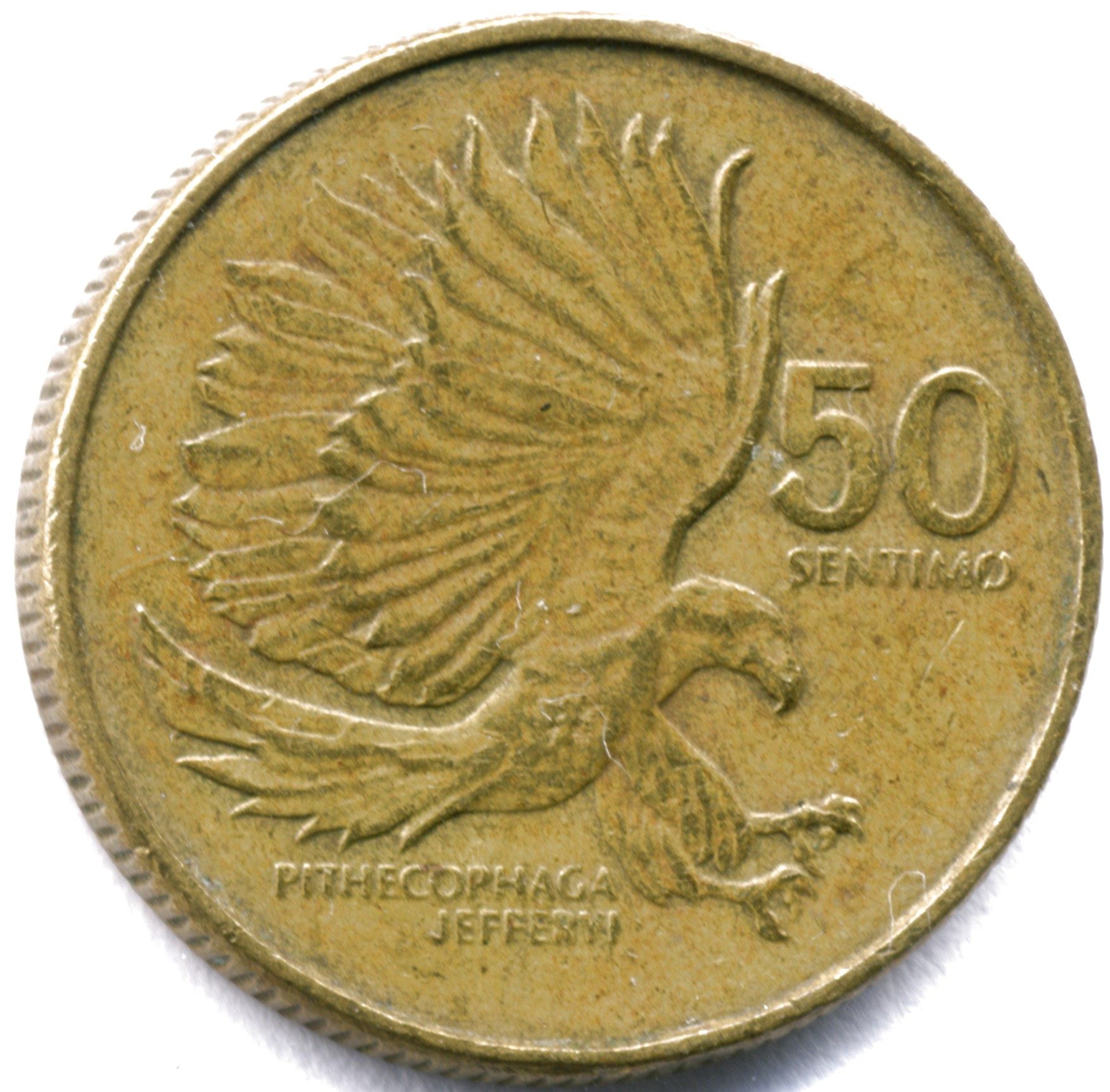
- Design: Pithecophaga jefferyi (Philippine eagle), Value
- Design date: 1991

The Philippine fifty-centavo coin (Filipino: Limampung sentimo) (50¢) was a denomination of Philippine currency. It was minted for the Philippines from 1864 to 1994 and was demonetized in 1998.

== History ==
=== Spanish administration ===
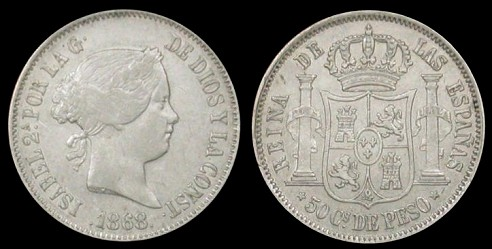
50 centimos de peso under Spanish rule, 1868

Prior to 1864, coins valued at 1/2 a Spanish dollar (or peso) or four reales issued by Spain and Spanish America were generally accepted in the Philippines for half a peso. The half-peso coin was considered as the successor to the pre-Hispanic silver denomination rupee or rupiah, locally called salapi. In 1864 a silver 50-centimo coin was issued specifically for the Philippines weighing 12.98 grams of 0.9 fine silver (reduced to 0.835 fine after 1881).

=== United States administration ===
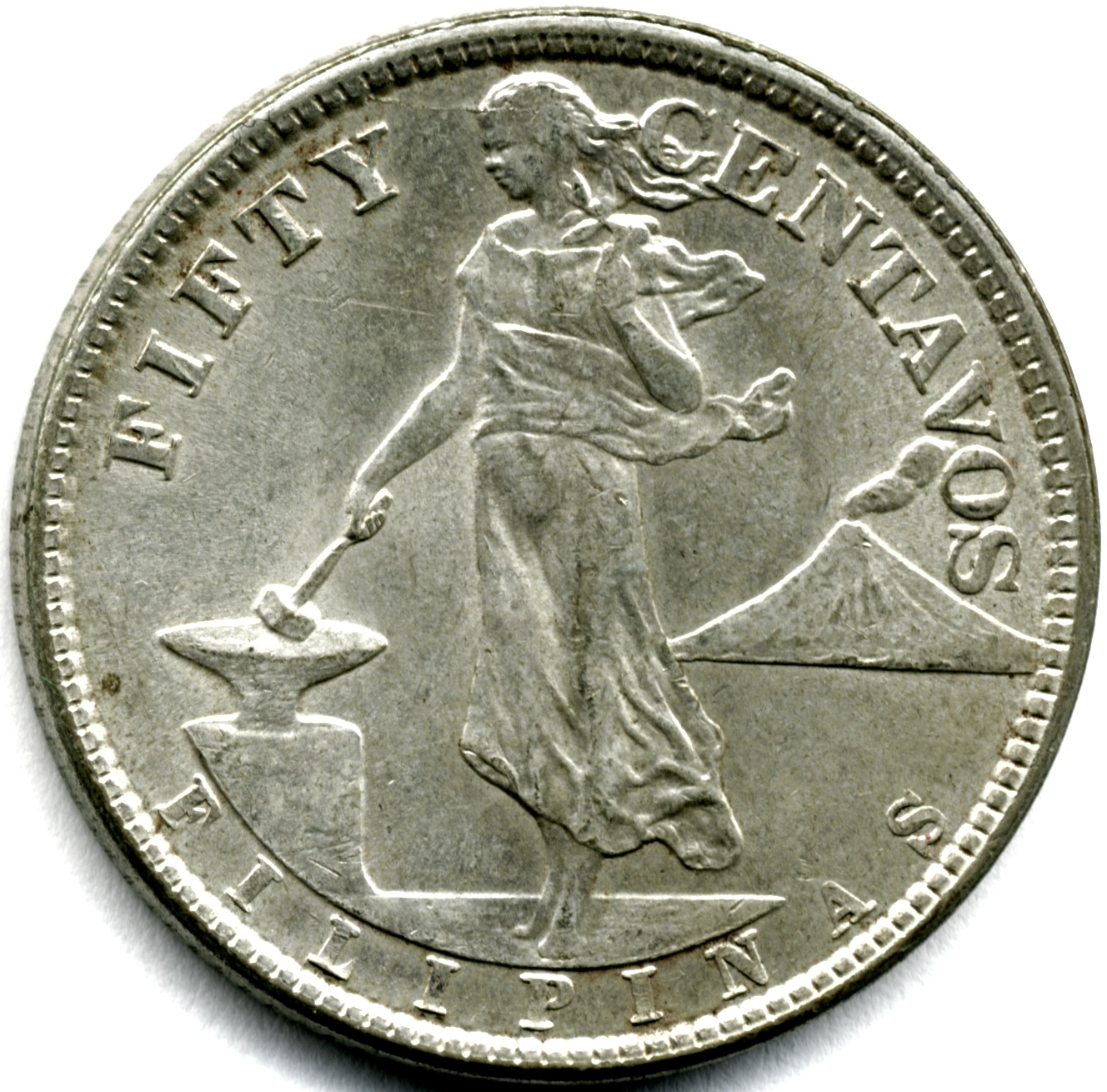
50 centavos issued under US rule, 1907-1945

In 1903 the 50-centavo coin equivalent to 1/4th a U.S. dollar was minted for the Philippines, weighing 13.48 grams of 0.9 fine silver. Its specifications were reduced from 1907 to 10.0 grams of 0.75 fine silver; this was minted until 1945.

=== Independence ===
- English Series: In 1958, minting of the centavo resumed with another coat of arms on the reverse. The inscription around the coat of arms was changed to 'Central Bank of the Philippines'.
- Pilipino Series: In 1969, the coin featured the Tagalog language for the first time. Its obverse featured Marcelo H. del Pilar in profile to the left, a Filipino writer, lawyer, journalist, and freemason of the Philippine Revolution during the late 19th century. The inscription around the shield of the Coat of arms of the Philippines on its reverse read 'Republika ng Pilipinas', however, mintage of this coin was discontinued with the introduction of the Ang Bagong Lipunan Series.
- 1983: BSP reintroduces 50¢ coins as part of the Flora and Fauna Series. The coin has the profile of Marcelo del Pilar on the obverse and the Pithecophaga jefferyi (Philippine eagle) on the reverse.
- 1991: Improved Flora and Fauna Series, features the same designs on both the obverse and reverse, but minted in brass instead of Copper-Nickel and smaller size, and a reed was added.
- 1995: The fifty-centavo coin was not included when the BSP Series was introduced.
- 1998: The 50¢ coin and other coins in the original Flora and Fauna and Improved Flora and Fauna Series was withdrawn, making the coin officially demonetized.

=== Version history ===
	English Series (1958–1967)	Pilipino Series (1969–1974)	Flora and Fauna Series (1983–1990, 1991–1994)
Obverse			
Reverse			

== Errors ==
Some of the coins of the Flora and Fauna Series had an error; in the fifty-centavo coin, the text was "Pitecobhaga jefferyi" instead of "Pitecophaga jefferyi", It was later replaced by the Bangko Sentral ng Pilipinas.
