= Philippine twenty-centavo coin =

Twenty centavos
- Philippines
- Value: 0.20 Philippine peso
- Mass: 4 g
- Diameter: 20.00 mm
- Edge: Reeded
- Composition: 75% silver, 25% copper
- Years of minting: 1880–1945

Obverse
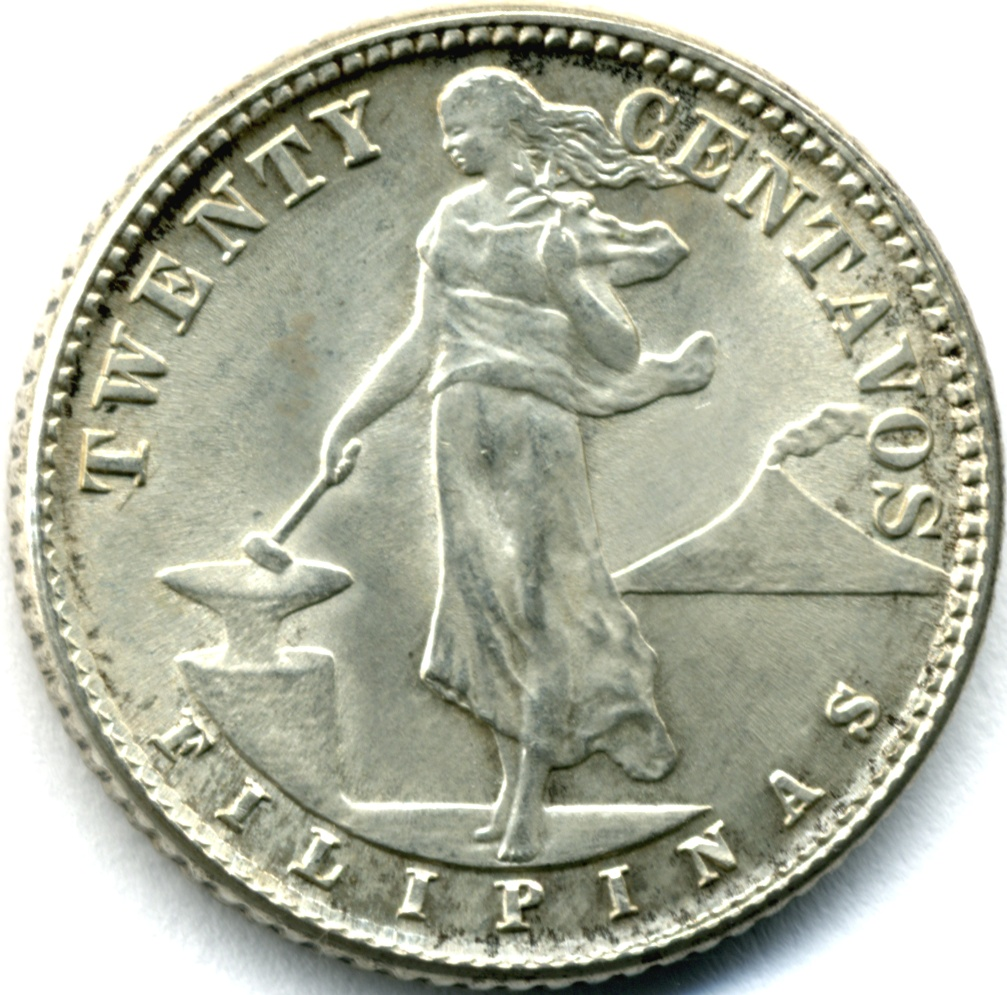
- Design: The standing figure of an adolescent female was utilized. She is clad in a long, flowing gown and holds in her right hand a hammer, resting atop an anvil, as seen on the minor coins. Behind her is again Mt. Mayon, an almost perfectly conical volcanic mountain southeast of the capital city of Manila. The statement of value appears above her (Ten, Twenty, and/or Fifty Centavos) in English, while the name of the archipelago is written below in Spanish as FILIPINAS.
- Design date: 1937

Reverse
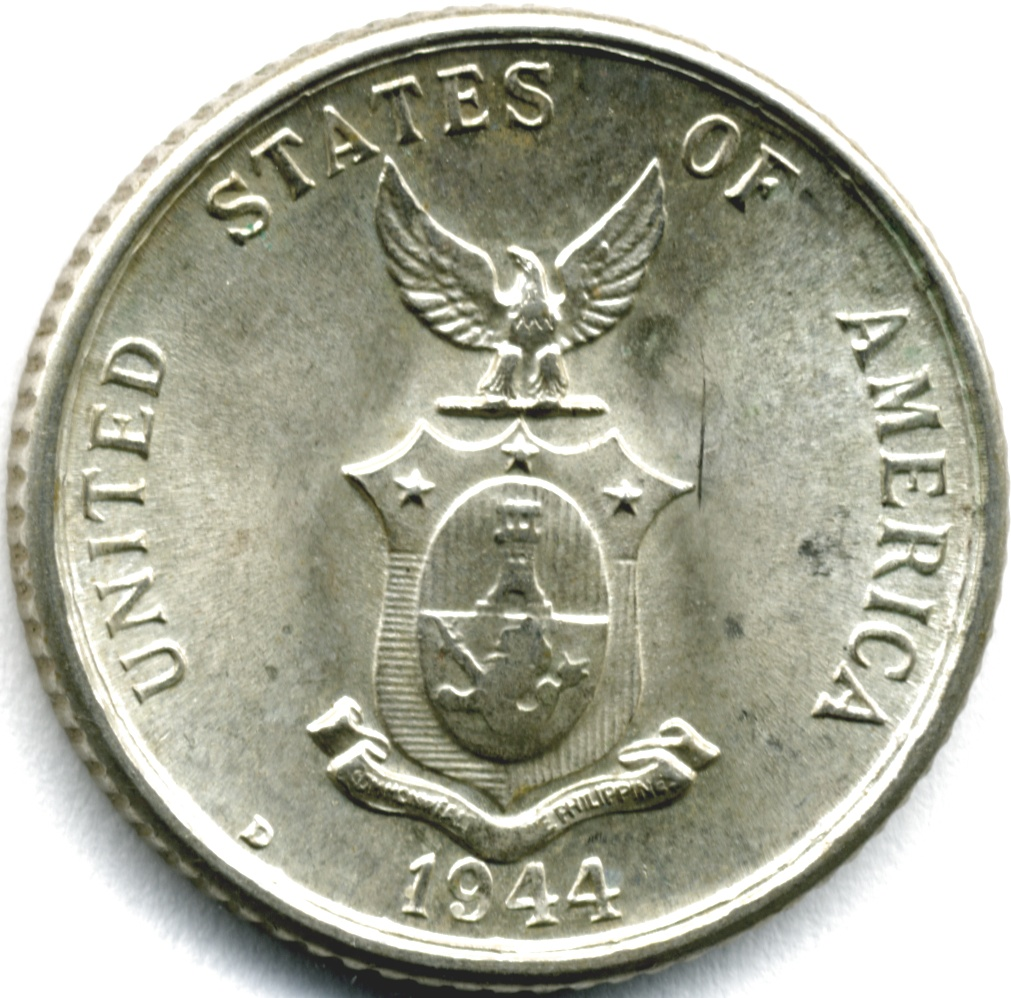
- Design: The coat of arms of the Commonwealth of the Philippines. Around this appeared the legend UNITED STATES OF AMERICA, the mint mark, and the date of coinage.
- Design date: 1937

The Philippine twenty-centavo (20¢) coin was a denomination of the Philippine peso. The one-fifth (1/5) peso was introduced by both the Spaniards and the Americans during the colonial era of the Philippines. It was replaced by a banknote of the same denomination introduced alongside the establishment of the Central Bank of the Philippines (Bangko Sentral ng Pilipinas) in 1949 and it was replaced by the twenty-five centavo coin.

== History ==
=== Spanish period (1864–1885) ===
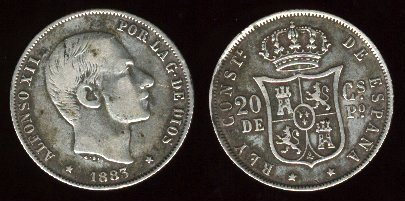
20 centimos, spanish rule (1883)

The twenty-centavo coin for the Philippines was introduced in the time of Queen Isabel II of Spain. The coin was not abundant in number until 1868, where more than 1 million coins were made, and 1868 became a common year minted on the twenty-centavo coin. King Alfonso XII of Spain continued the minted of the coin during 1880 to 1885.

=== American period (1903–1945) ===
During the American period in the country, the twenty-centavo coin was reintroduced in 1903. It contained 90% silver and 10% copper, weighed 5.3849 grams, and had a diameter of 23 millimeters. In 1907, the coin was reduced to a diameter of 20.86 millimeters, and the silver content of that coin was 75%. During the time of the Commonwealth of the Philippines, the symbol on the reverse side of the coin was changed in 1937, and production of the coin ended during 1945. Since then, the coin has not been produced until there are plans to reintroduce the twenty-centavo coin by the Bangko Sentral ng Pilipinas.

	The Philippines under U.S. Sovereignty (1898–1935)	Commonwealth Issues (1935–1945)
Obverse		
Reverse		
