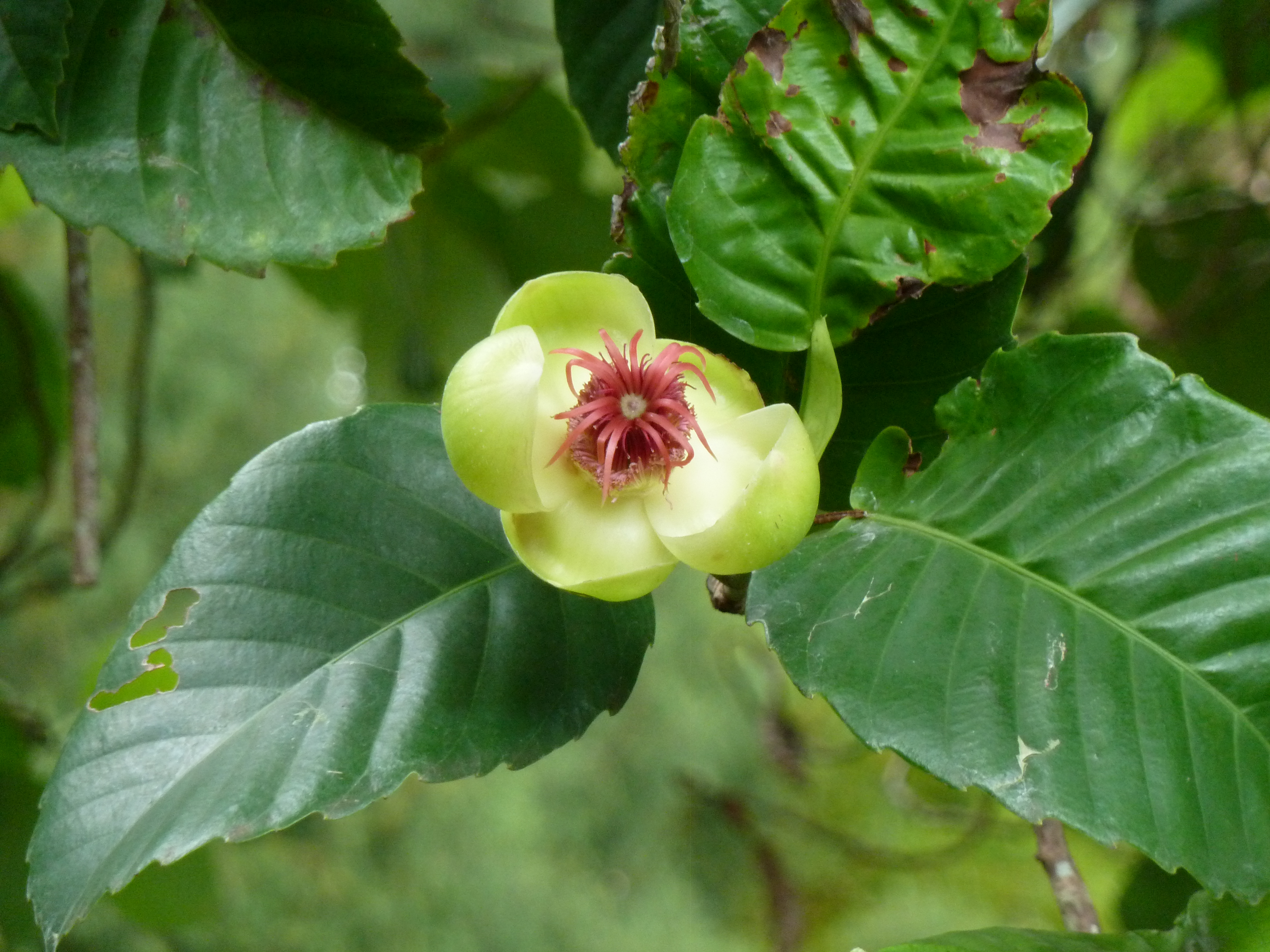
- Dillenia philippinensis flower (petals shed) at Wahiawa Botanical Garden

Conservation status
- Near Threatened (IUCN 3.1)

Scientific classification
- Kingdom: Plantae
- Clade: Embryophytes
- Clade: Tracheophytes
- Clade: Spermatophytes
- Clade: Angiosperms
- Clade: Eudicots
- Order: Dilleniales
- Family: Dilleniaceae
- Genus: Dillenia
- Species: D. philippinensis

Binomial name
- Dillenia philippinensis Rolfe

= Dillenia philippinensis =

Katmon

Species of tree

Dillenia philippinensis (katmon) is a species of flowering plant in the family Dillenaceae. It is endemic to the Philippines and can be used for urban greening. Its fruit is known as elephant apple. Katmon grows in low to medium altitude forests throughout the Philippines, but does not survive the cold climates of the uplands.

Katmon is featured on the reverse side of the Philippine twenty-five centavo coin since 2018 as part of the New Generation Currency Coin Series.

== Description ==
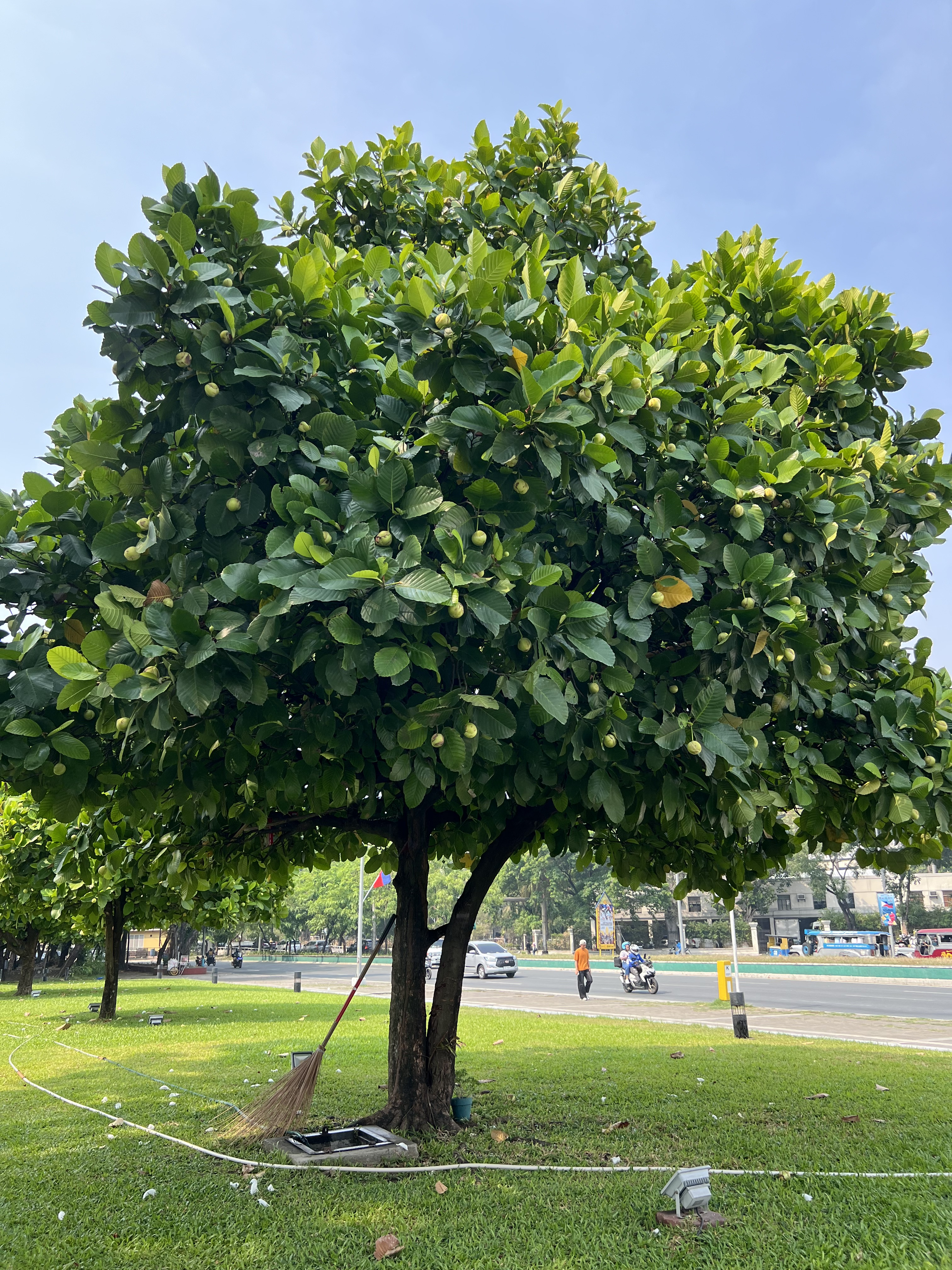
Dillenia philippinensis tree

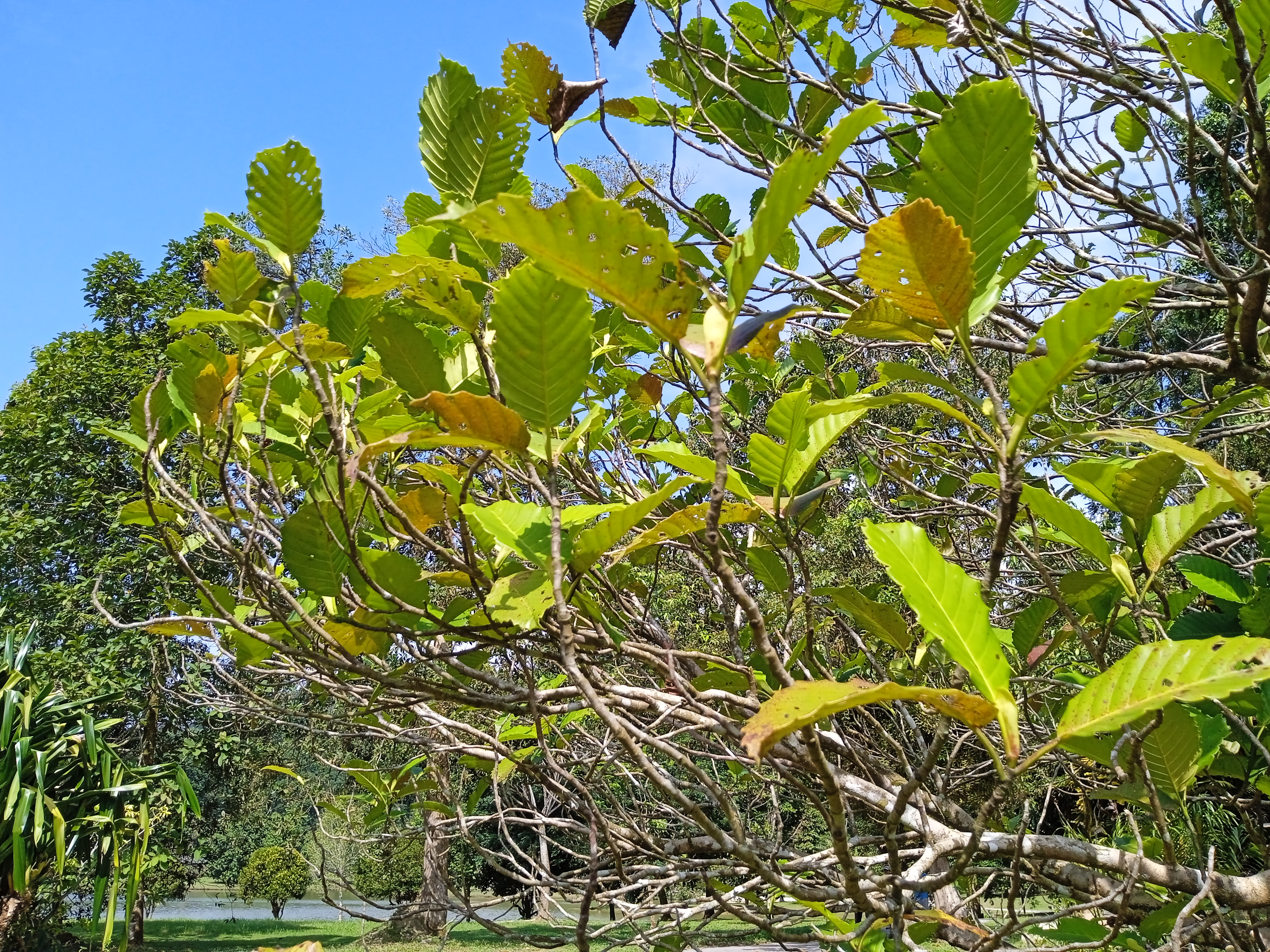
Dillenia philippinensis leaves

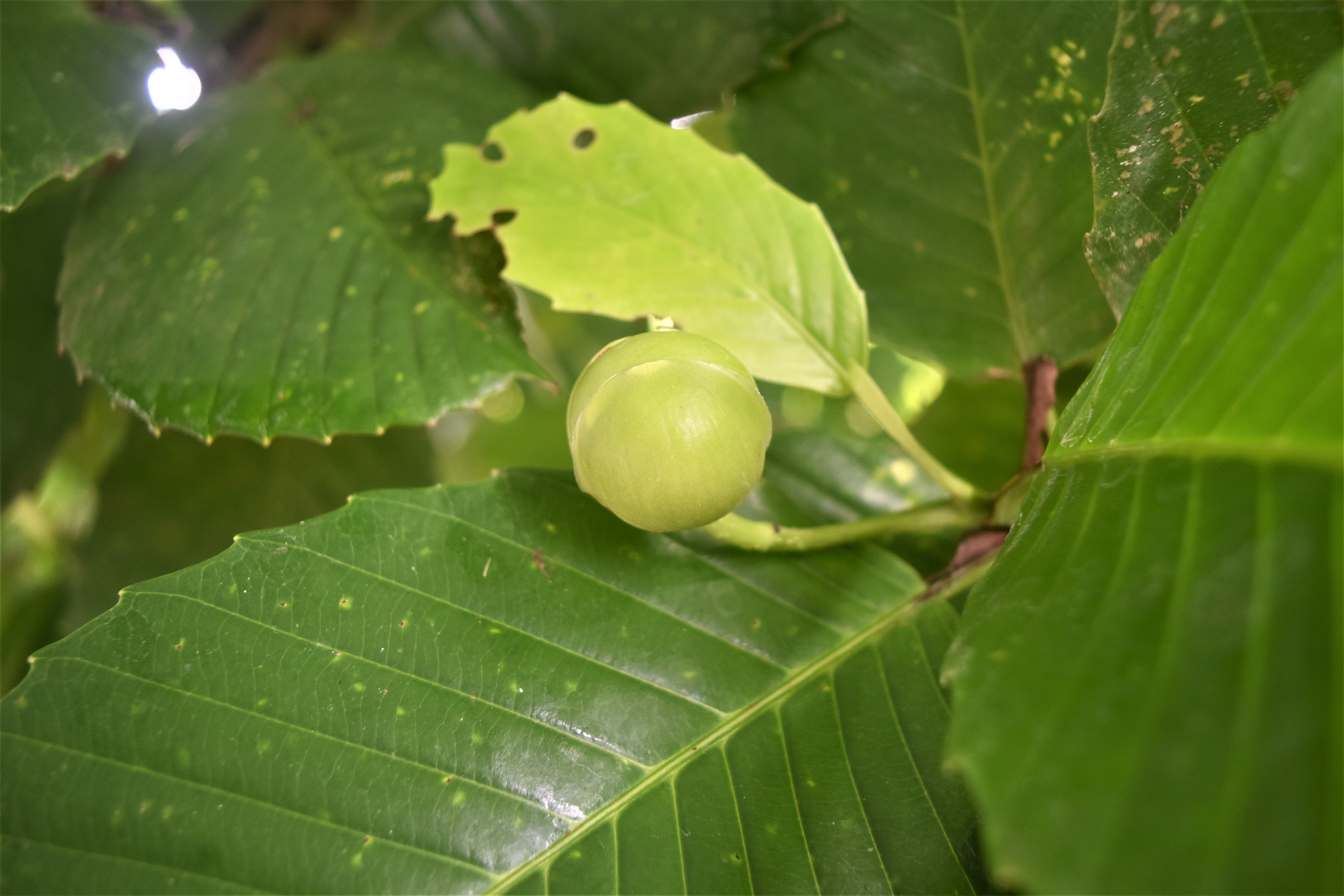
Dillenia philippinensis fruit

Katmon is a medium-sized evergreen tree that grows as high as 10 to 15 meters. Its trunk is erect and the branches usually start midway of the trunk. The tree is buttress-forming, evergreen, and shade tolerant. The bark is smooth with shallow fissures. The leaves are leathery, shining, ovate, elliptic or oblong-ovate, about 12 to 25 centimeters long, and coarsely toothed at the margins. Its flowers are white, large, showy, and about 15 centimeters in diameter with reddish pistils and stamens. The edible fruits are rounded, about six to eight centimeters in diameter, with large fleshy sepals tightly enclosing the true fruit.

== Uses ==
The fruit, called "elephant apple", has a diameter that is around five to six centimeters. It contains a soft, fleshy, green, and edible pulp with a flavor similar to a sour green apple. It is used to make sauces, jams, and flavoring for fish. The fruit's acid is mixed with sugar to make a traditional cure for cough. It is also used to clean the hair.

The tree is harvested for its timber as it is suitable for furniture and cabinet making. The wood has a beautiful silver grain similar to a quartered oak. A red dye can also be obtained from the bark.
