= Philippine ten-centavo coin =

Denomination of the Philippine peso

Ten sentimo
- Philippines
- Value: 0.10 Philippine peso
- Mass: 2.5 g
- Diameter: 17.00 mm
- Thickness: 1.67 mm
- Edge: Reeded
- Composition: Copper-plated steel
- Years of minting: 1880–2017

Obverse
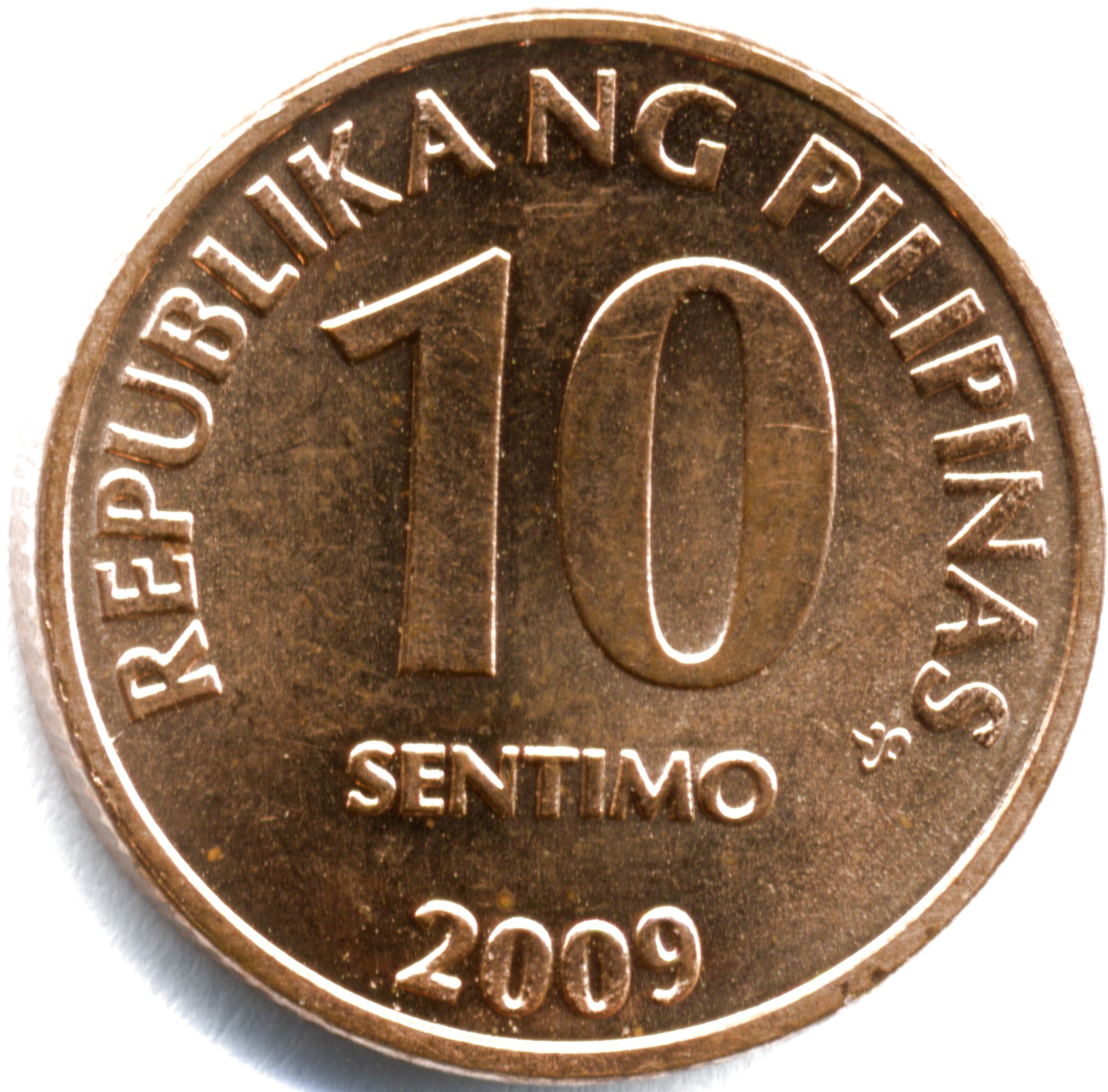
- Design: Denomination, country name in Tagalog and year. (Note this is an image of a Philippine 10 sentimo coin)
- Design date: 1995

Reverse
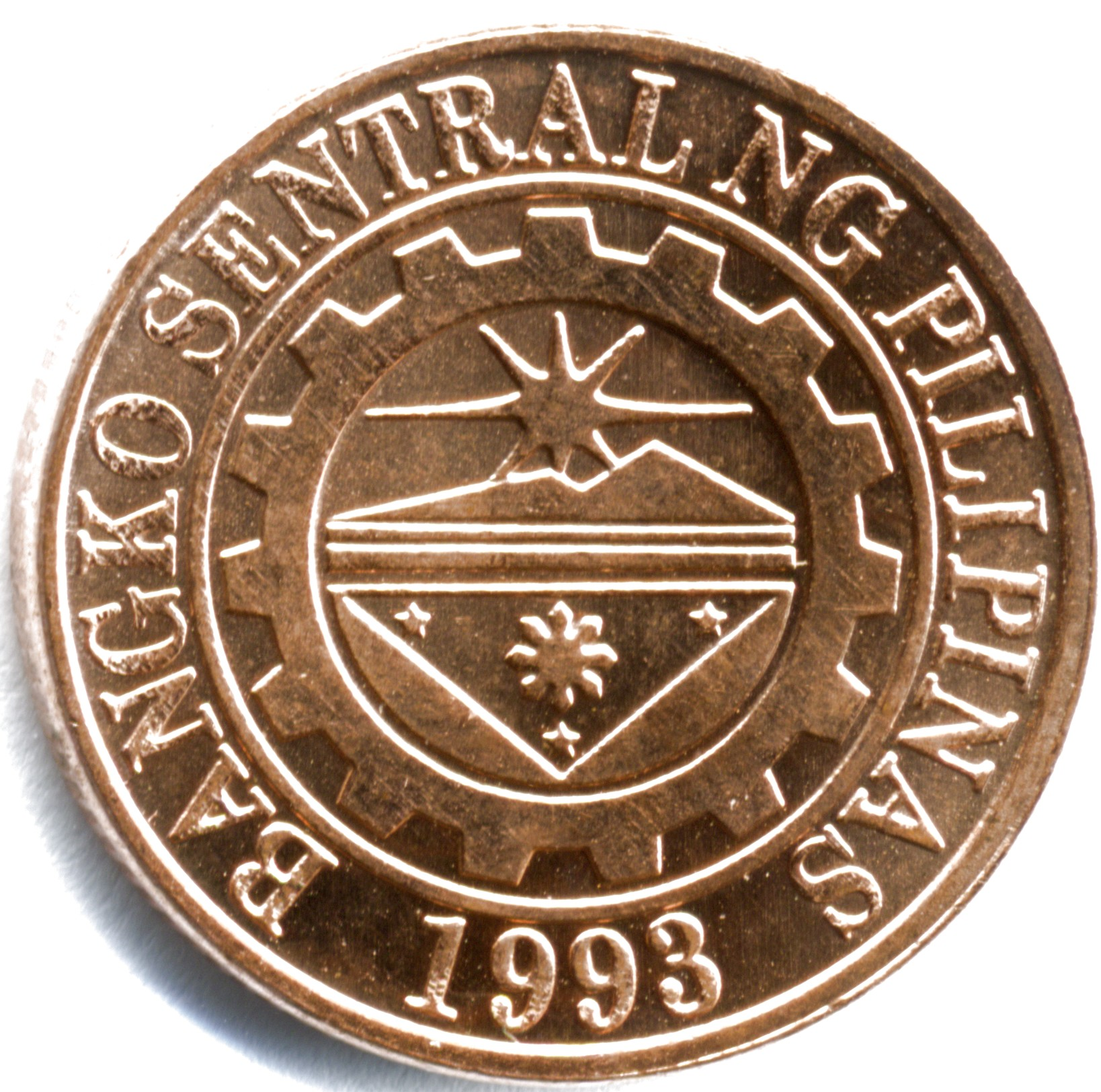
- Design: Logo of the Bangko Sentral ng Pilipinas
- Design date: 1995

The ten-sentimo coin (10¢) coin is a denomination of the Philippine peso. It was the oldest denomination under 1 peso in the country's circulation, having been introduced in 1880 during the Spanish rule of the islands until it stopped being minted in 2017. The denomination remains legal tender until the demonetization of the BSP Coin Series.

== History ==
=== Spanish administration ===
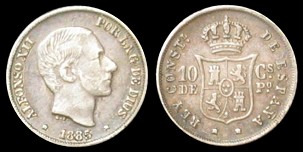
10 centimos, 1864-1885

The first coin worth one tenth of a peso was the 10 centimo coin of 1864-1888 issued under Queen Isabel II of Spain, followed by 10 centimos of 1880-1885 issued under King Alfonso XII. The latter obverse was inscribed 'Alfonso XII por La G(racia) de Dios' (Alfonso XII, by the Grace of God) and the year of minting. The reverse featured the coat of arms of Castille and Kingdom of León. Around it was the inscription 'Rey de Espana' (King of Spain) and the denomination as 10 Cs. de Po. (10 centimos of peso).

=== United States administration ===
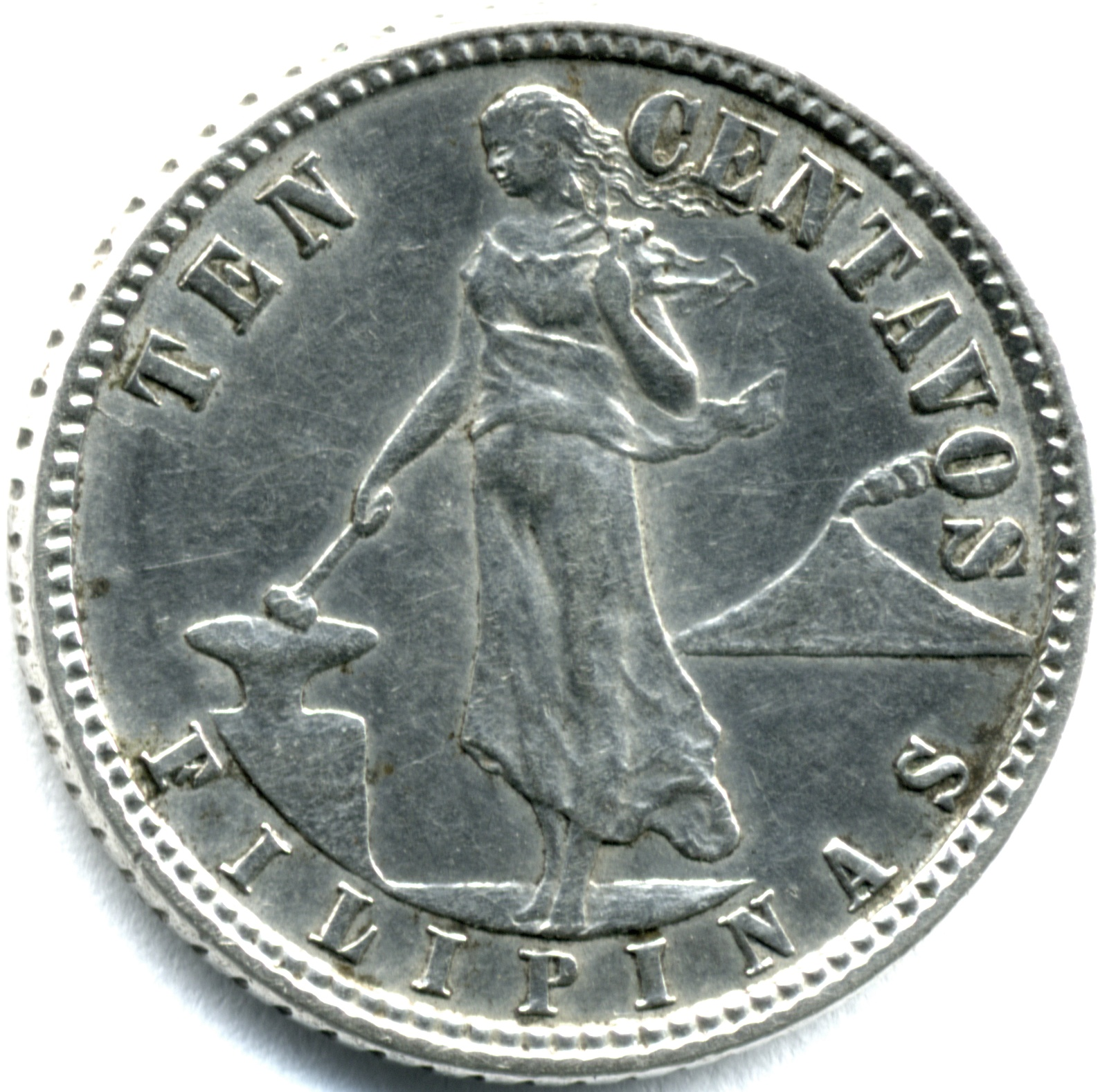
10 centavos issued 1907-1945

In 1903, the 10-centavo coin equivalent to US$0.05 was minted for the Philippines, weighing 2.7 grams (0.095 oz) of 0.9 fine silver. Its specifications were reduced from 1907 to 2.0 grams (0.071 oz) of 0.75 fine silver; this was minted until 1945.

=== Independence ===
==== English Series ====
In 1958, minting of the centavo resumed with another coat of arms on the reverse. The inscription around the coat of arms was changed to 'Central Bank of the Philippines'.

==== Pilipino Series ====
In 1969, the coin featured the Tagalog language for the first time. Its obverse featured Francisco Baltazar, also known as Francisco Balagtas and a prominent Filipino poet widely considered as one of the greatest Filipino literary laureates for his impact on Filipino literature, in profile to the left. The inscription around the shield on its reverse read 'Republika ng Pilipinas'.

==== Ang Bagong Lipunan Series ====
A second coin featuring Baltazar was minted from 1975 to 1983. The name of the Republic was moved to the obverse, and Baltazar now faced right. On the reverse was the inscription 'Ang Bagong Lipunan'. The issues from 1979 to 1982 featured a mintmark underneath the 10 centavo.

==== Flora and Fauna Series ====
From 1983 to 1994, a new coin was issued with Baltazar again faced to the left in profile, and the denomination was moved to the reverse with the date on the obverse. The Pandaka pygmaea is featured on the reverse.

==== BSP Coin Series ====
The current version has been minted since 1995 and is copper-coloured. It features no human at all. The reverse has the 1993 logo of the Bangko Sentral ng Pilipinas. The name of the republic, the date and denomination are all on the obverse.

==== New Generation Currency Series ====
The BSP announced in 2017 that the ten-centavo coin would not be included in this series, and that it was dropping the coin from circulation. The BSP Series coin will still be used until that series will be demonetized.

=== Version history ===
	English Series (1958–1967)	Pilipino Series (1969–1974)	Ang Bagong Lipunan Series (1975–1983)	Flora and Fauna Series (1983–1994)	BSP Coin Series (1995–2017)
Obverse					
Reverse					
