= Graphium idaeoides =

- Hewitson's figure (top) in Illustrations of new species of exotic butterflies

Conservation status
- Vulnerable (IUCN 3.1)

Scientific classification
- Kingdom: Animalia
- Phylum: Arthropoda
- Clade: Pancrustacea
- Class: Insecta
- Order: Lepidoptera
- Family: Papilionidae
- Genus: Graphium
- Species: G. idaeoides

Binomial name
- Graphium idaeoides Hewitson, 1855

Subspecies
- Graphium idaeoides idaeoides; Graphium idaeoides neergaardi (Page & Treadaway, 2003)

Synonyms
- Papilio idaeoides

Species of butterfly

Graphium idaeoides (Philippine butterfly) is a species of butterfly in the family Papilionidae. It is endemic to the Philippines. It is a perfect mimic of Idea leuconoe.

== Sources ==
- Page M. G.P & Treadaway, C. G. 2003 Schmetterlinge der Erde, Butterflies of the world Part XVII (17), Papilionidae IX Papilionidae of the Philippine Islands. Edited by Erich Bauer and Thomas Frankenbach Keltern : Goecke & Evers; Canterbury : Hillside Books. ISBN 978-3-931374-45-7
