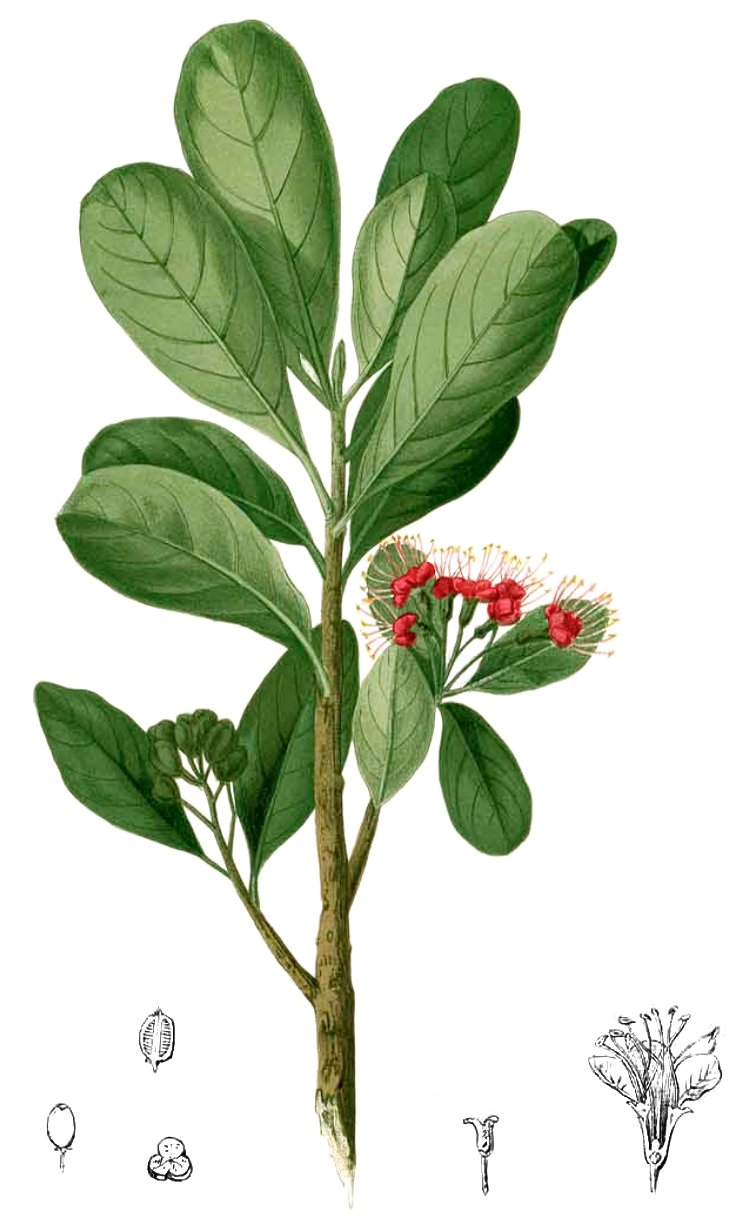

Conservation status
- Vulnerable (IUCN 3.1)

Scientific classification
- Kingdom: Plantae
- Clade: Tracheophytes
- Clade: Angiosperms
- Clade: Eudicots
- Clade: Rosids
- Order: Myrtales
- Family: Myrtaceae
- Genus: Xanthostemon
- Species: X. verdugonianus

Binomial name
- Xanthostemon verdugonianus Náves ex Fern.-Vill.

= Xanthostemon verdugonianus =

Species of flowering plant

Xanthostemon verdugonianus, commonly known as mangkono or Philippine ironwood, is a species of plant in the family Myrtaceae. It is endemic to the islands of the Visayas, Palawan, and northeastern Mindanao. It is valued for its extremely durable and heavy timber. It is threatened by habitat loss.

== Names ==
Mangkono (also spelled mangkuno or mancono) is also known as palo de hierro ("iron wood") in Spanish. It is also known as Magkuno (Magcuno) or Makano (Macano) in Surigaonon; and Magkuno or Tamaulauan in Visayan.

== Description ==
Mangkono has a maximum recorded diameter of around 3.8 ft (1.2 m), and a maximum recorded height of 33 ft (10 m). However most trees rarely exceed 1.6 ft (0.49 m) in diameter and 8 ft (2.4 m) in height. The trunk is usually highly irregular with frequent branching. The bark is slate white in color and has a peeling appearance. The sapwood is usually pale reddish in color while the heartwood is deep red to brown.

The leaves are around 8 to 12 cm (3.1 to 4.7 in) in length, and 5 cm (2.0 in) in width. They are dark green in color on the upper side and pale whitish green on the underside. They have a smooth, leathery texture. They are simple and are arranged alternately.

The inflorescence is borne at the ends of branches. They are bright red in color and spring from the apex of the peduncles. Each inflorescence has multiple peduncles, each with 3 to 6 flowers, for a total of 13 to 20 per inflorescence. Around 12 fruits develop from the flowers. The fruits are dehiscent and septicidal, with two or three sections that open when ripe to disperse small semicircular seeds.

== Timber ==
Xanthostemon verdugonianus is known to be the hardest Philippine hardwood species. Cutting a 70-cm thick tree with axes normally requires three hours, but cutting a Mangkono tree with the same diameter usually takes two to four days. Diamond-point saws have been used exclusively but a great volume of water is needed to counter overheating.

Because of its inherent hardness and high density, Mangkono has long been recognized as a substitute for the world-famous Lignum vitae (Guaicum officinale L.). Mangkono is an excellent material for the bearing or stern bushing of a steamship's propeller shaft. Its other uses are as rollers, shears, saw guide blocks, tool handles, novelties, poles and piles for wharves and bridges, and posts for houses.

== Conservation ==
The tree is rare and is classified as Vulnerable by the IUCN due to overharvesting and habitat loss.
