= Arévalo (disambiguation) =

Arévalo is a municipality in Spain.

Arévalo may also refer to:

== Municipalities in Spain ==
- Arévalo de la Sierra, municipality located in the province of Soria, Castile and León
- Montejo de Arévalo, municipality located in the province of Segovia, Castile and León
- Nava de Arévalo, municipality located in the province of Ávila, Castile and León
- San Vicente de Arévalo, municipality located in the province of Ávila, Castile and León

== Others ==
- Arévalo (surname)
- Arévalo (actor) (1947–2024), Spanish comedian and actor
- Arevalo, Iloilo City, Philippine district of Iloilo City
- Museo de Historia de Arévalo, museum devoted to the history of the town of Arévalo in Spain
