= Mausoleum of the Veterans of the Revolution =

Burial place in Manila, Philippines

- Mausoleo de los Veteranos de la Revolucion (Spanish)
- The mausoleum in 2026
- Interactive map of Mausoleum of the Veterans of the Revolution
- Location: Manila North Cemetery, Manila, Philippines
- Designer: Arcadio de Guzmán Arellano
- Type: War memorial
- Opening date: May 20, 1920
- Dedicated to: Filipino revolutionaries of the Philippine Revolution and the Philippine–American War

The Mausoleum of the Veterans of the Revolution (Spanish: Panteón de los Veteranos de la Revolución or the Mausoleo de los Veteranos de la Revolución) is a memorial and national monument dedicated to Filipino revolutionaries of the Philippine Revolution of the 1890s and the Philippine–American War situated inside the Manila North Cemetery in Manila, Philippines.

== History ==
The Mousoleo de los Veteranos de la Revolucion historical marker

=== Early years ===
The memorial was commissioned through Executive Order No. 87, issued by Governor-General James F. Smith on August 28, 1908. Arcadio Arellano made the design for the monument in 1915 and the Asociación de los Veteranos de la Revolución and the city government of Manila was responsible for the construction of the structure. It was inaugurated on May 30, 1920.

=== Heritage designation ===
The monument was declared a National Historical Landmark on April 6, 1993.

=== Renovation ===
In October 2018, the monument was repainted with lead free paints by volunteers of the EcoWaste Coalition.

== Design ==
The design of the monument was made by Arcadio de Guzmán Arellano, the brother of Juan Arellano. The neoclassical structure is a massive cubic structure on an elevated square podium. A shallow dome rests on a drum fenestrated by small openings to allow the circulation of air and primarily to let the natural light to come in. Swags, frets with key patterns, and human figures that represent grief to those who died fill up the façade.

== Notable burials ==
- Some graves in the mausoleum
  Juan Arévalo, Son of Bonifacio Arévalo. Assembly Member, Declaration of Philippine Independence
- Bonifacio Arévalo y Flores, Filipino ilustrado, dentist, sculptor, propagandist, and an ardent patron of music and theater. Treasurer, La Liga Filipina. Founder, Sociedad Dental de Filipinas (now Philippine Dental Association)
- Pio del Pilar, General of the Philippine Revolution
- Adriano Hernandez y Dayot, Filipino revolutionary, patriot, and military strategist during the Philippine Revolution and the Philippine–American War.

=== Former interments ===
- Melchora Aquino, "Grand Old Woman of the Katipunan", gave medical attention and encouraged the revolutionaries. Remains were later transferred to Himlayang Pilipino, then the Tandang Sora National Shrine in Quezon City.
- Marcelo del Pilar, Filipino writer, lawyer, journalist, and freemason. One of the leaders of the Propaganda Movement. Remains were transferred to Marcelo H. del Pilar Shrine in Bulakan, Bulacan.
- Apolinario Mabini, Filipino lawyer and statesman, First Prime Minister of the Philippines. Remains were originally interred in the Manila Chinese cemetery, then transferred to the Mausoleum of the Veterans of the Revolution. Re-interred in the Apolinario Mabini Shrine in his hometown of Tanauan, Batangas
- Emilio Jacinto, Filipino General of the Philippine Revolution. Initially interred at the Sta. Cruz, Laguna. Reinterred at the Mausoleum of the Veterans of the Revolution. Lastly, remains were transferred at the Himlayang Pilipino, Quezon city.

== Popular culture ==
- A scene from the 1984 Filipino neo noir crime prison drama film Bulaklak sa City Jail was shot inside the building.
