= Arévalo (surname) =

Arévalo (Spanish pronunciation: [aˈɾeβalo]) is a Spanish surname. Notable people with the surname include:

- Alfredo Arévalo (born 1976), Guatemalan marathon runner
- Arístides Chavier Arévalo (1867 – 1942), Puerto Rican pianist, modernism composer, musicologist and music author
- Bernardo Arévalo (born 1958), president of Guatemala
- Bonifacio Flores Arévalo (1850 – 1920), sculptor and patron of the arts
- Bueno Arévalo Julio Fernando (born ?), Ecuadorian musician
- Cecilia Soledad Arévalo (born 1968), Mexican politician
- Daniel Arévalo Gallegos (born 1962), Mexican politician
- Daniel Sánchez Arévalo (born 1970), Spanish screenwriter and film director
- Diana Arevalo (born 1981), American nonprofit executive and politician
- Domingo Arévalo (born 1968), former Paraguayan footballer
- Edelmiro Arévalo (1929–2008), former Paraguayan footballer
- Egidio Arévalo Ríos (born 1982), Uruguayan footballer
- Éider Arévalo (born 1993), Colombian racewalker
- Faustino Arévalo (1747 – 1824), Spanish Jesuit hymnographer and patrologist
- Fernando Espino Arévalo (born 1949), Mexican politician
- Gonzalo Moreno Arévalo (born 1958), Mexican politician
- Guillermo Arévalo (born 1952), Shipibo shaman of the Peruvian Amazon
- Javier Arevalo (1937–2020), Mexican artist
- José Antonio Arévalo González (born 1971), Mexican politician
- Juan Arévalo (? – ?), Assembly Member of the Declaration of Philippine Independence
- Juan José Arévalo (1904 – 1990), Guatemalan president
- Luis Antonio Arévalo Espadas (born 1982), Spanish swimmer
- Marcelo Arévalo (born 1990), Salvadoran tennis player, younger brother of Rafael
- Marco Vinicio Cerezo Arévalo (born 1942), Guatemalan politician
- Rafael Arévalo (born 1986), Salvadoran tennis player, older brother of Marcelo
- Rafael Arévalo Martínez (1884 – 1975), Guatemalan writer
- Raúl Arévalo (born 1979), Spanish film actor
- Robert Arevalo (1938–2023), Filipino actor
- Samantha Arévalo (born 1994), Ecuadorian swimmer
- Sara Carbonero Arévalo (born 1984), Spanish sports journalist
- Tito Arévalo (1911 – 2000), Filipino actor and musician
- Tomás Domínguez Arévalo (1882–1952), Spanish politician
- Víctor Hugo Arévalo Jordán (born 1946), Bolivian writer and noted university professor
- Young Man of Arévalo (15th/early 16th century – possibly second half of 16th century), Spanish crypto-Muslim author
