= Arevalo =

Arevalo may refer to:

- Arévalo, a municipality in Spain
- Arevalo, Iloilo City, a district of Iloilo City, Philippines
- Arévalo (surname)
- Arévalo (actor) (1947–2024), Spanish comedian and actor
