= Tandang Sora Women's Museum =

Museum in Quezon City, Philippines

- The museum in 2025
- Established: 2025
- Coordinates: 14°40′59.7″N 121°02′44.0″E
- Curator: Sandra Torrijos (2025)
- Building details

General information
- Status: Completed
- Architectural style: Bahay na bato
- Location: Quezon City, Philippines
- Construction started: 2024
- Opening: 2025

Technical details
- Floor count: 2

Design and construction
- Architect: Gerard Lico
- Architecture firm: Arc Lico

The Tandang Sora Women's Museum is a museum in Quezon City, Philippines.

== History ==
Sandra Torrijos, a feminist who was active in the 1980s, has aspired for the establishment of a dedicated women's museum in the Philippines. In April 2023, Torrijos presented a concept paper for a museum to Quezon City mayor Joy Belmonte, who approved of the plan. Torrijos coordinated with other women-led organizations to help realize the plan.

In January 2024, construction of the facility, which was later named the Tandang Sora Women's Museum, began. The office of Senator Risa Hontiveros, a women's rights advocate, funded the construction.

The Tandang Sora Women's Museum had a soft opening on January 6, 2025, coinciding with the 213th birth anniversary of its namesake, Melchora Aquino. It was later inaugurated on February 19, 2025. Torrijos became the first curator of the facility which is considered as the first women's museum in the Philippines.

== Facilities and collection ==
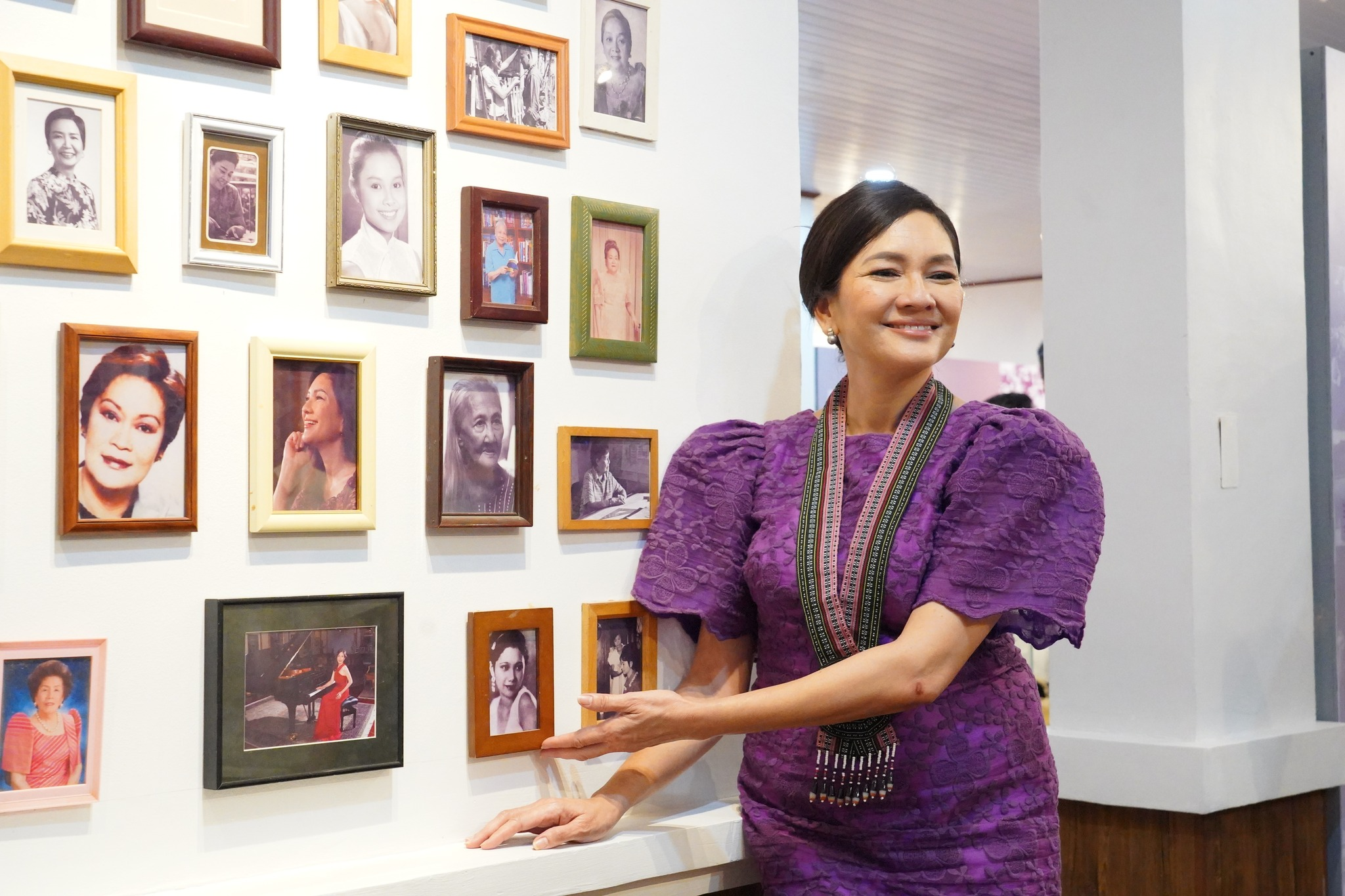
Senator Risa Hontiveros posing by the portraits exhibit, where her portrait is included, in 2025

The museum is housed inside a two-story bahay na bato-inspired structure and was designed by Arc Lico, which is led by architect Gerard Lico. It is located beside the Tandang Sora National Shrine, which is likewise dedicated to Melchora Aquino, an important figure in the Philippine Revolution. The museum features Aquino, as well as other women from Philippine history such as the babaylan and suffragettes.
