= Grupo Illiniza =

Illiniza
- Origin: Quito, Ecuador
- Genres: Popular Latin American music, World music, fusion, Andean, folk, trova, Urbana, Brazilian music, Afro Caribbean, nueva canción
- Years active: 1979-present
- Label: Illiniza Recs (1984–present)
- Members: Byron Viteri Pólit; Gem Viteri Pólit; Wilson Haro; Paolo Játiva; Antonio Cilio; Fabricio Espinosa; Esteban Dobronsky; Fernando Cilio
- Past members: Milton Arias; Segundo Condor; Esteban Rivera; Luís Guevara; Patricio Cevallos; Luís Sánchez; Pancho Mena; Raúl Yepez; Wladimir Piedra; Diego Chiriboga; Fernando Guevara; Washington Barreno
- Website: Official Website

Illiniza (also known as Grupo Illiniza) is a cultural association from Ecuador centered in popular Latin American music since 1979. It has been recognized as one of the most influential musical ensembles in the country.

== History ==
Illiniza was established in 1979 and debuted on TV by winning a national music contest. The ensemble was created with the idea of culturally linking and preserving the different nationalities and music of the communities that make up Latin America. It all began at the Instituto Nacional Mejía, a high school made up of city youth, some of whom were quite concerned about the reality of the time, and wanted to do something proactively in order to change things and influence people in a positive way.

Illiniza has performed on stage next to musicians and dancing ensembles from Latin America, North America, Europe, Asia and Africa such as Inti-Illimani, Joan Manuel Serrat, Luis Eduardo Aute, Mercedes Sosa, Silvio Rodríguez, León Gieco, Quilapayun, Los Nocheros, Quinteto Tiempo, The Moscow Ballet, Piero De Benedictis, Alex Alvear, Los Olimareños, Los Visconti, Tito Fernández, Illapu, Gabino Palomares, Los Folkloristas, Pete Seeger, Holly Near, Bernice Johnson Reagon, Sweet Honey in the Rock, Vicente Feliú, Tania Libertad, Quinteto Tiempo, Manuel Capella, Grupo Raiz, Noel Nicola, Kosetsu Minami, Adrian Goizueta, Pueblo Nuevo, Jaime Guevara, Roy Brown, Carlos Díaz "Caíto", Luis Enrique Mejía Godoy, among others.

The members of the group are generally invited to tour European or American countries with the purpose of sharing their repertoire which is varied and elaborate, demonstrating instrumental and vocal virtuosity in festivals and concerts that include performing genres such as fusion, world music, folk, Latin, trova, Afro Caribbean, Andean, Brazilian, and nueva canción, among others.

== Awards and distinctions ==
In 2010 illiniza received several Awards in a national music composition contest entitled Canción de los Andes which is organized yearly by the Education Ministry of Ecuador. The categories include Innovation of Musical Genre and Execution of musical instruments

Throughout its long musical career spanning over 30 years, the association has received several national and international awards as well as distinctions including trophies, gold and silver medals, certifications in European as well as American music and dance competitions, festivals and concert performances. They have also been awarded the prestigious title Ambassadors of Art and Friendship in Belgium.

Two books and other publications cite Grupo Illiniza as a reference in various musical genres. These include Andean Music and Ecuadorian Musical Groups.

Illiniza has been recognized by respected musicologists like director and musical composer Julio Bueno as being one of the most important representative groups of Ecuador's popular music.

== Activities ==
Concert performances, Musical Atelliers, Instrumentation Workshops, Musical Instrument Seminars oriented towards teaching techniques such as instrument performing and playing, Educational Workshops, Musical Instruments Hand crafting and Manufacturing.
