= Philippine five-centavo coin =

Denomination of Filipino currency

Five sentimo
- Philippines
- Value: 0.05 Philippine peso
- Mass: 1.9 g (1944 troy oz)
- Diameter: 15.5 mm
- Thickness: 1.60 mm
- Edge: Reeded
- Composition: Nickel-plated steel
- Years of minting: 1903–present

Obverse
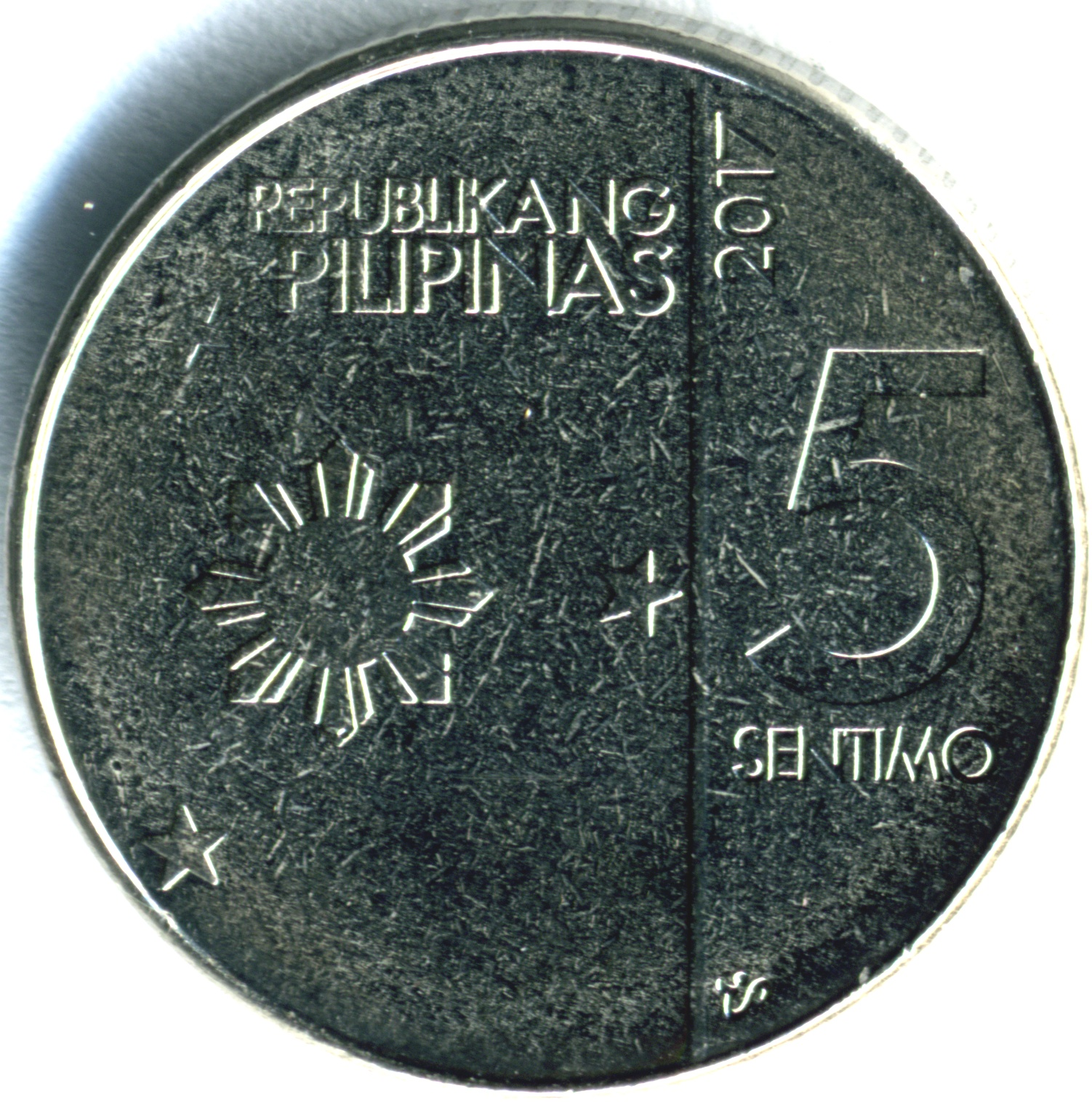
- Design: "Republika ng Pilipinas", Three stars and the sun (stylized representation of the Philippine flag); Value; Year of minting; Mint mark
- Designer: Bangko Sentral ng Pilipinas
- Design date: 2017

Reverse
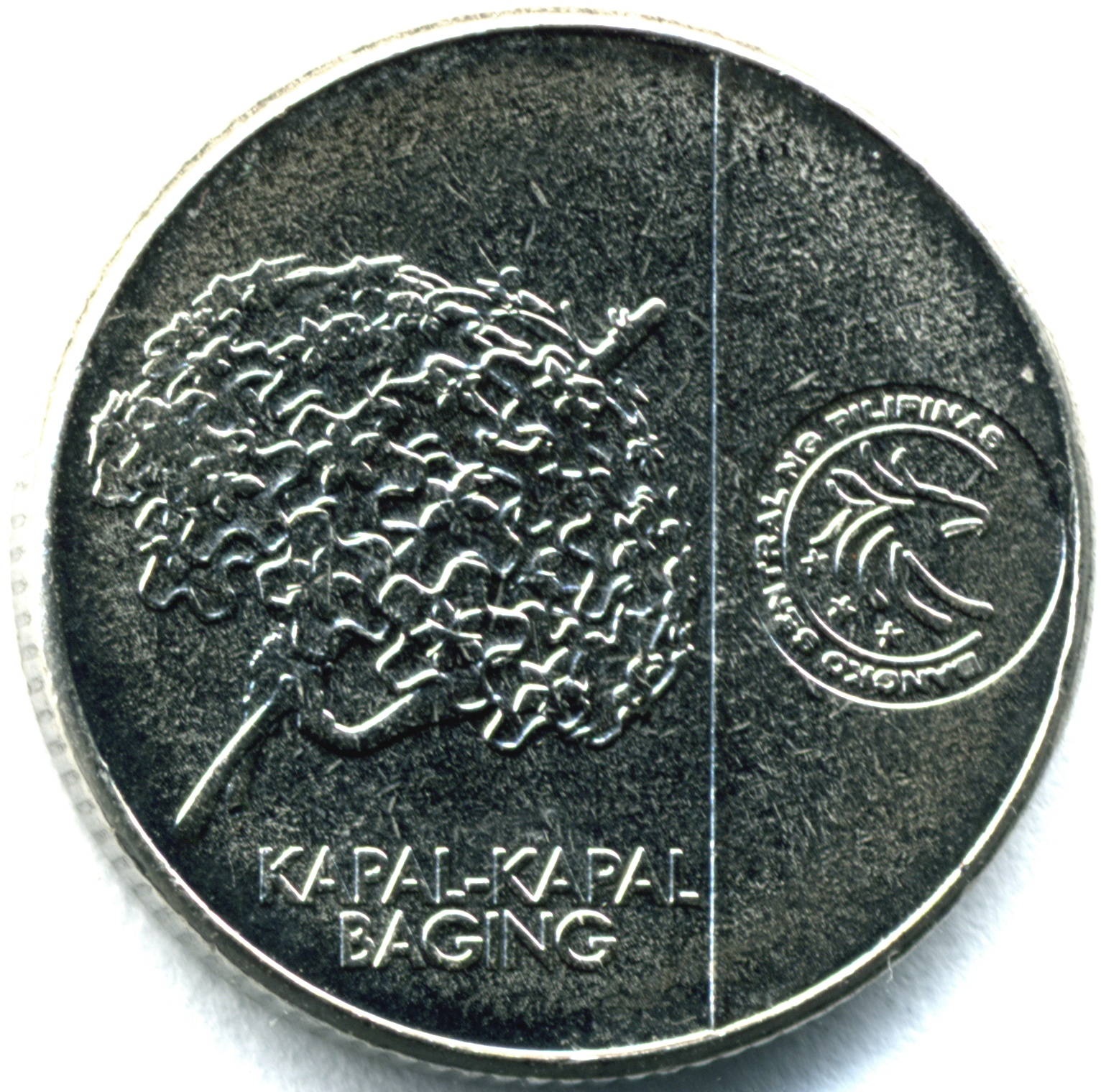
- Design: Hoya pubicalyx (Kapal-kapal baging); logo of the Bangko Sentral ng Pilipinas
- Designer: Bangko Sentral ng Pilipinas
- Design date: 2017

The five-sentimo coin (5¢) coin is the second-lowest denomination coin of the Philippine peso after the one sentimo.

== History ==
=== Pre-independence ===
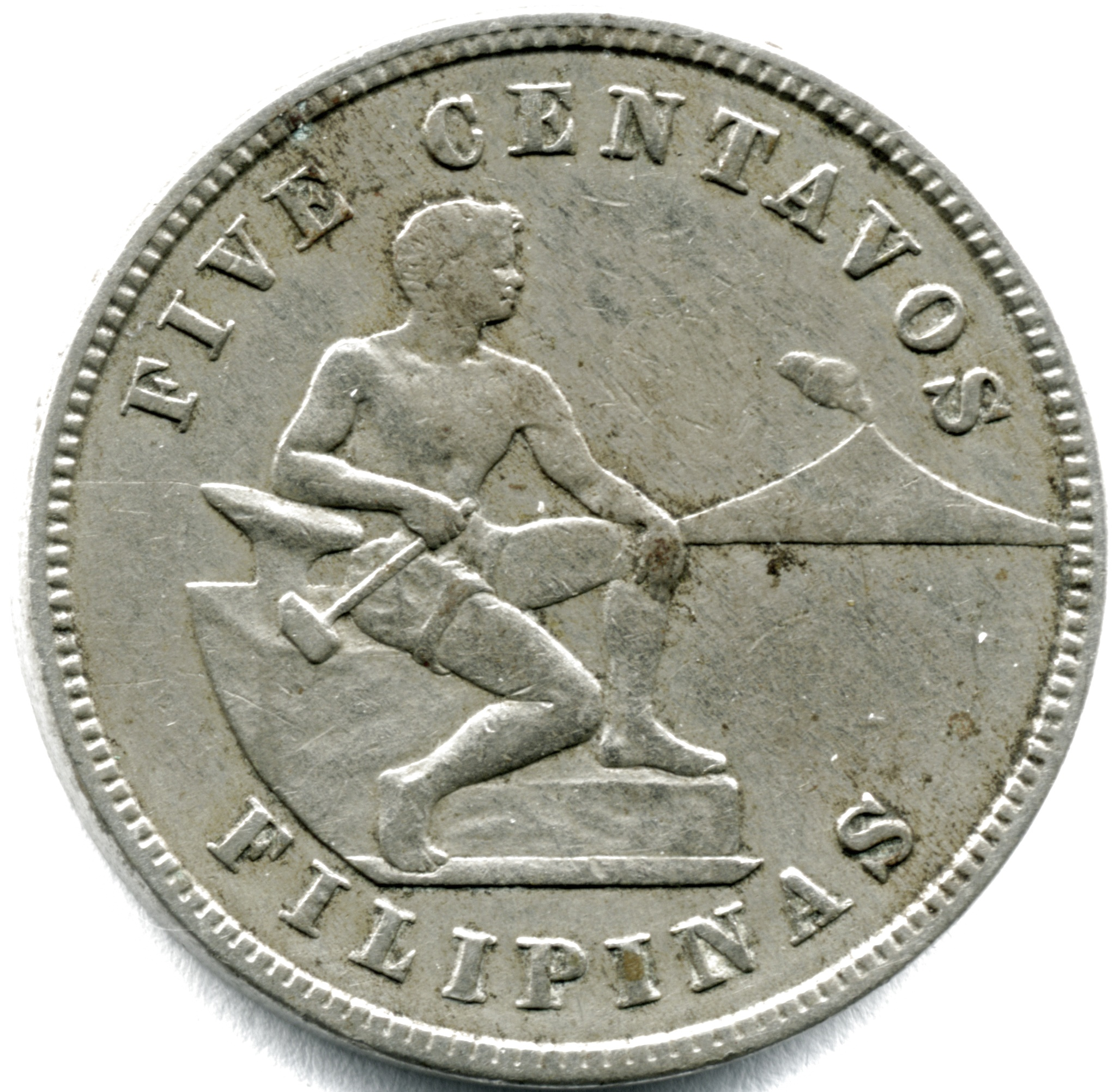
5 centavos issued 1903-1928

No coin worth 1/20 of a peso circulated during the Spanish rule of the Philippines, when the 10 centimo coin was the lowest denomination of the Philippine peso fuerte. The Mexican 5-centavo (1/20th of a peso) silver coin, however, was accepted in the Philippines for the same value.

The first five-centavo coin was minted in 1903, the first year of minting during the American rule of the country, gained after the Spanish–American War. The coin's images were identical to those of the half-centavo and one-centavo coins.

The obverse featured a native with a volcano in the distance, with the coin's denomination above him, and the inscription 'Filipinas' underneath. The reverse featured the American coat of arms, and had the inscription 'United States of America' circling it. The year of issue was underneath the coat of arms.

The last minting of this first coin was in 1928. A smaller version was minted between 1930 and 1935. In 1937 the coat of arms was changed to a Philippine one and this coin was issued until 1945

=== Independence ===
==== English Series ====
In 1958, minting of the centavo resumed with another coat of arms on the reverse. The inscription around the coat of arms was changed to 'Central Bank of the Philippines'.

==== Pilipino Series ====
In 1969, the coin featured the Tagalog language for the first time. Its obverse featured Melchora Aquino in profile to the right, a Filipina revolutionary who became known as "Tandang Sora" (English: "Elder Sora") because of her age and her contributions. The inscription around the shield read 'Republika ng Pilipinas'.

==== Ang Bagong Lipunan Series ====
A second eight-pointed scallop edge coin featuring Aquino was minted from 1975 to 1983. The name of the Republic was moved to the obverse, and Aquino now faced left. On the reverse read the inscription 'Ang Bagong Lipunan'. The issues from 1979 to 1982 featured a mintmark underneath the five centavo.

==== Flora and Fauna Series ====
From 1983 to 1992, the coin was now round and silver in color, Aquino again faced the right in profile, and the denomination was moved to the reverse with the date on the front. The waling-waling (Vanda sanderiana) is featured on the reverse.

==== BSP Coin Series ====
Issued from 1995, the five sentimo coin is minted in copper-plated steel, and featured no subject presented. The obverse side contained the denomination, the name of the republic and its year of issue. The reverse side featured the 1993 logo of the Bangko Sentral ng Pilipinas. Due to its low buying power, (an exchange rate in November 2014 gives it a value of 0.0011 USD, 0.0007 GBP, 0.000878 EUR, 0.031 THB) the coin is commonly used as a keyring decoration or as a washer due to its hole.

==== New Generation Currency Coin Series ====
Issued in 2017, this issue depicts the stylized representation of the Philippine flag, the three stars and the sun, the name of the republic, denomination and its year of issue on the obverse. The reverse features the Kapal-kapal Baging (Hoya pubicalyx) flower and the, now former, logo of the Bangko Sentral ng Pilipinas.

=== Version history ===
	English Series (1958–1967)	Pilipino Series (1969–1974)	Ang Bagong Lipunan Series (1975–1983)	Flora and Fauna Series (1983–1992)	BSP Coin Series (1995–2017)	New Generation Currency Coin Series (2017–present)
Obverse						
Reverse						
