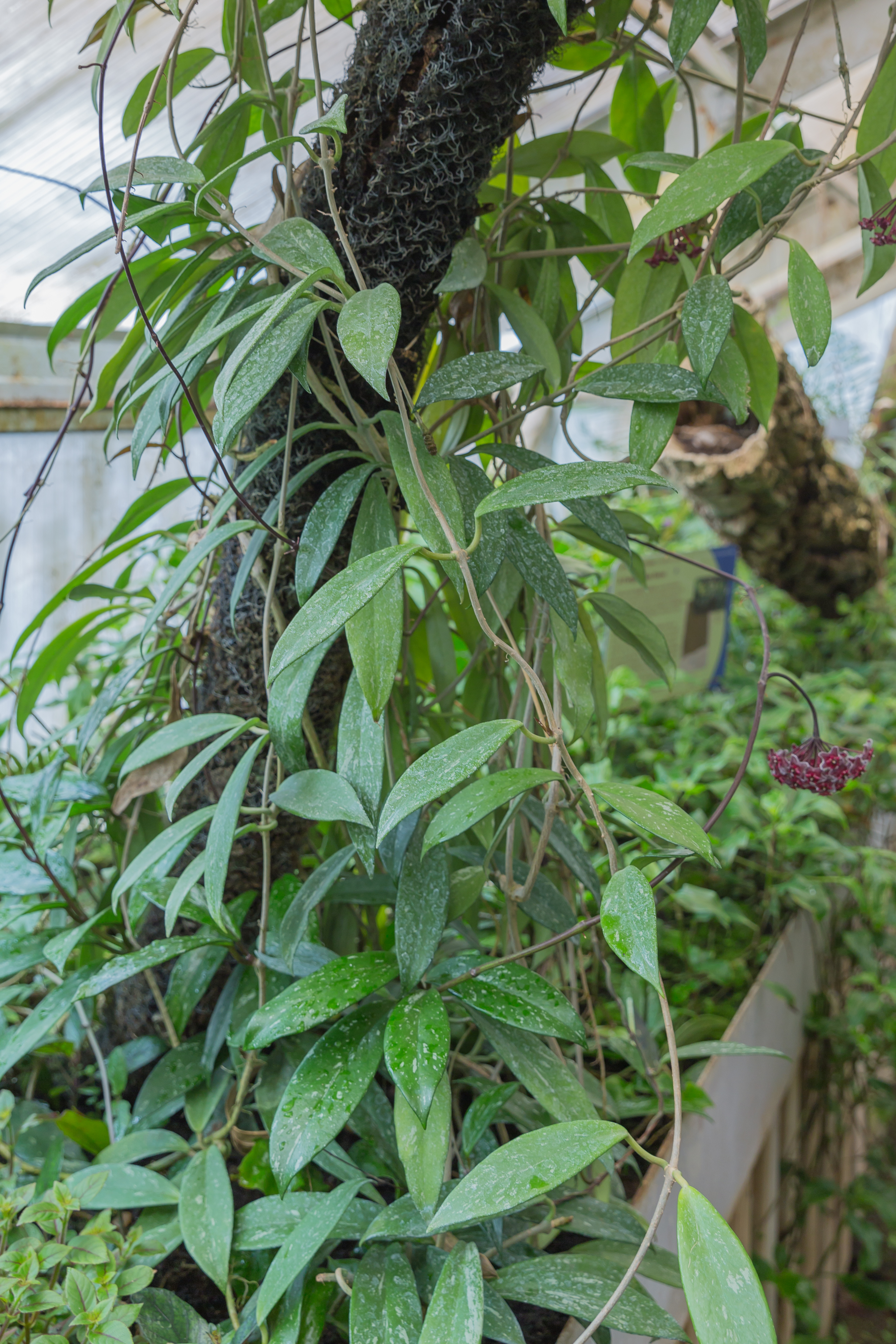
- Hoya pubicalyx growing at the Jardin botanique de Lyon

Scientific classification
- Kingdom: Plantae
- Clade: Tracheophytes
- Clade: Angiosperms
- Clade: Eudicots
- Clade: Asterids
- Order: Gentianales
- Family: Apocynaceae
- Genus: Hoya
- Species: H. pubicalyx

Binomial name
- Hoya pubicalyx Merr.

= Hoya pubicalyx =

Species of plant

Hoya pubicalyx is a species of flowering plant in the genus Hoya native to the Philippines.

== Description ==
Sometimes confused for Hoya carnosa, it has succulent, lanceolate foliage and grows in a vining habit epiphytically. Kept as a houseplant in temperate climates, it can be found in variegated forms in nurseries. The Philippine five-centavo coin of the New Generation Currency Series features the flowers of this plant.
