= Tandang Sora National Shrine =

National monument in Quezon City, Philippines

- Dambana ni Melchora "Tandang Sora" Aquino
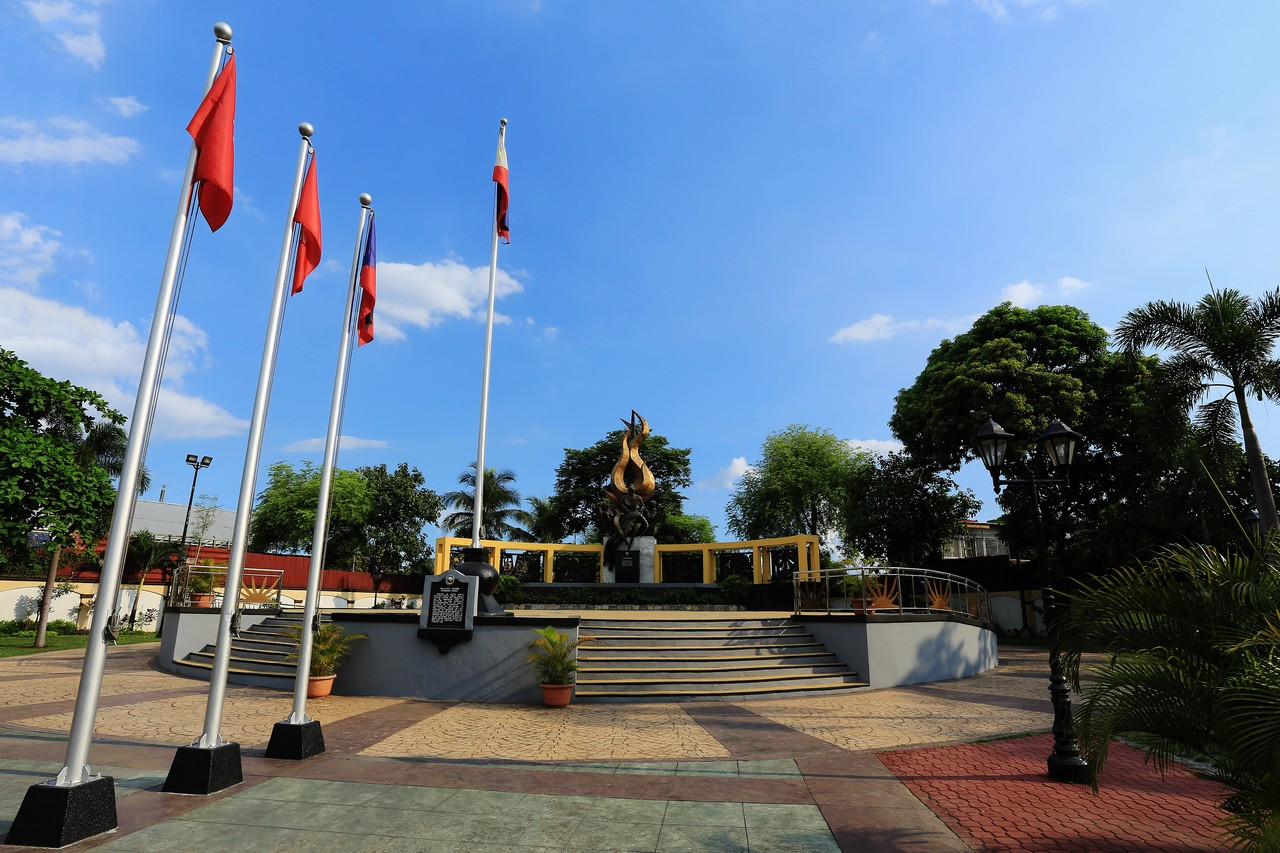
- Interactive map of Tandang Sora National Shrine
- Location: Banlat Road, Quezon City, Philippines
- Coordinates: 14°40′59″N 121°02′43″E
- Type: Memorial
- Completion date: 2008
- Dedicated to: Melchora Aquino

Park details
- Area: 1,000 m^{2} (11,000 sq ft)
- Operator: Quezon City Government
- Designation: National Shrine

The Tandang Sora National Shrine (Filipino: Dambana ni Melchora (Tandang Sora) Aquino) is a national monument and memorial park in Quezon City, Philippines. It is dedicated to Filipino revolutionary and centenarian, Melchora Aquino who is also known as "Tandang Sora".

== Background ==
Melchora Aquino, popularly known as Tandang Sora is a key figure in the Philippine Revolution who offered shelter and medical aid to Katipunan revolutionaries despite her old age. She was known by the titles of "Mother of the Katipunan" and the "Grand Old Woman of the Revolution" for her role in the revolution. The place where the memorial is situated, along in present-day Banlat Road in a barangay in Quezon City named in honor of her is her birthplace.

After her death, her remains were initially buried at the Mausoleum of the Veterans of the Revolution at the Manila North Cemetery before being transferred to the Himlayang Pilipino. In 2012, her remains were transferred to the Tandang Sora Shrine.

== History ==
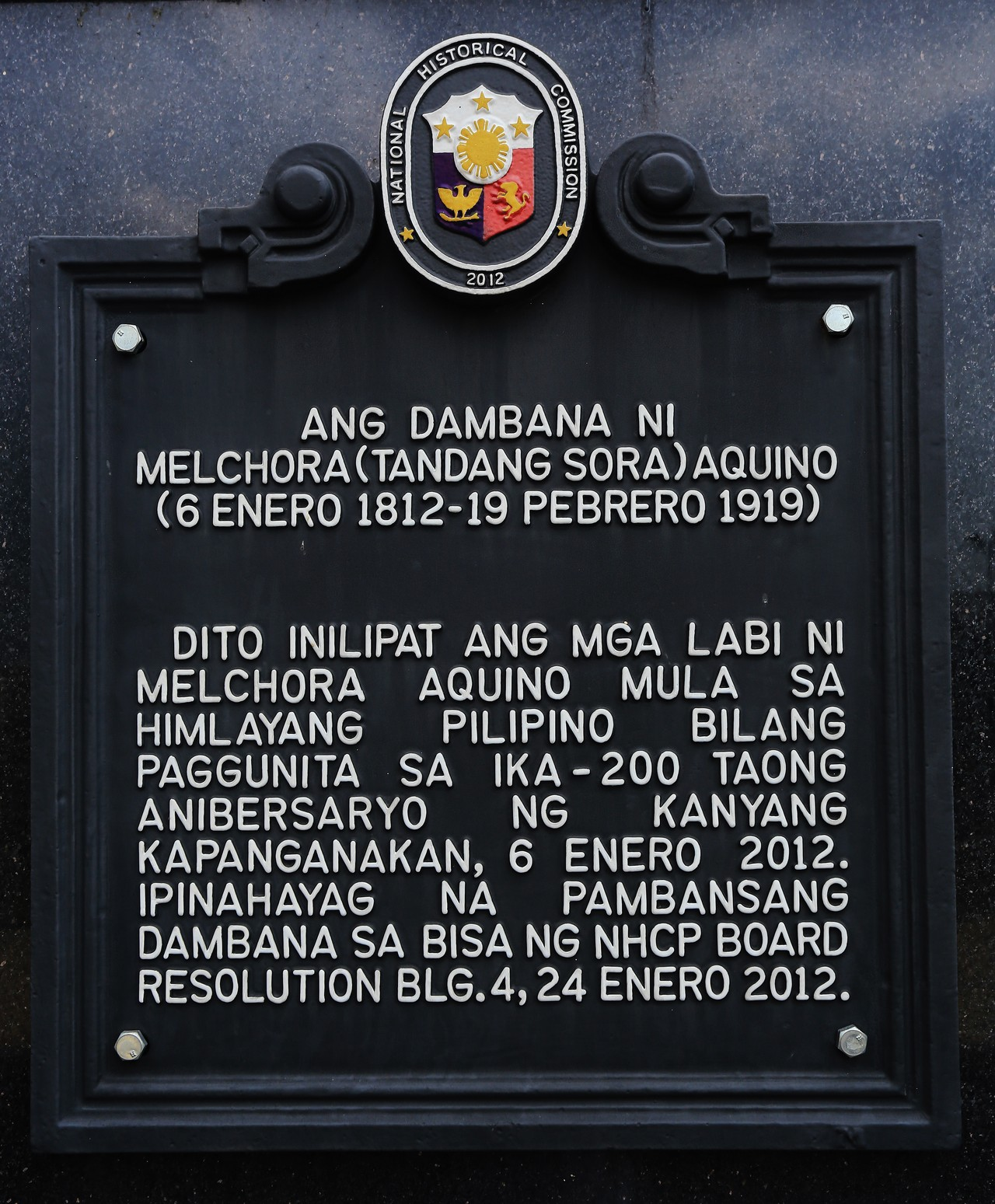
Historical marker

The Tandang Sora Shrine was "restored" by the Quezon City government in 2005 as a tribute to Melchora Aquino and the shrine was built in 2008 during the tenure of then-Quezon City Mayor Feliciano Belmonte Jr. Prior to the shrine's construction, a marker is already present near the site of the shrine although it is generally hidden from view from the public by houses.

The Quezon City Council declared 2012 as Tandang Sora Year, a year-long celebration to mark the 200th birth anniversary of Melchora Aquino. In line of the commemoration, there were efforts by the city government to have Aquino's remains which were then-located at the nearby Himlayang Pilipino exhumed and re-interred in the shrine. Such moves required approval from the Congress and their bid was helped by the approval of the National Historical Commission of the Philippines (NCHP) of the plan in 2011. The Himlayang Pilipino also gave consent for the exhumation of Tandang Sora's remains.

Melchora Aquino's remains were then re-interred at the Tandang Sora Shrine on January 6, 2012, on her birth day. The re-interment ceremony was led by Novaliches Bishop Antonio Tobias who blessed Aquino's casket.

The memorial was later declared a national shrine on March 2, 2012, by the NHCP through a resolution.

On February 19, 2025, the Tandang Sora Women's Museum, the Philippines's first women's museum, was opened at the shrine.

== Shrine ==
The shrine is on Banlat Road in Barangay Tandang Sora, Quezon City. It covers an area of 1,000 m^{2} (11,000 sq ft) and features a 10.67 m (35.0 ft) bronze sculpture. The remains of Melchora Aquino, which consisted of three small bones and ash at the time of her re-interment, were placed inside a small wooden casket, which in turn was put inside a square niche at the foot of the bronze sculpture by Toym Imao.

An art gallery on shrine grounds features paintings and other sculptures dedicated to Tandang Sora, and made by local artists of Quezon City. It also has a pavilion and stage for events, and a mini-museum dedicated to Aquino.
