= Association of Veterans of the Revolution =

Philippine veterans' organization

Association of Veterans of the Revolution (Asociación de los Veteranos de la Revolución)
- Founder: Emilio Aguinaldo
- Established: 1912
- Focus: Secure pensions for the former Philippine Revolutionary Army
- President: Baldomero Aguinaldo (1912–1915); Emilio Aguinaldo (1915–1940s)
- Location: Philippines

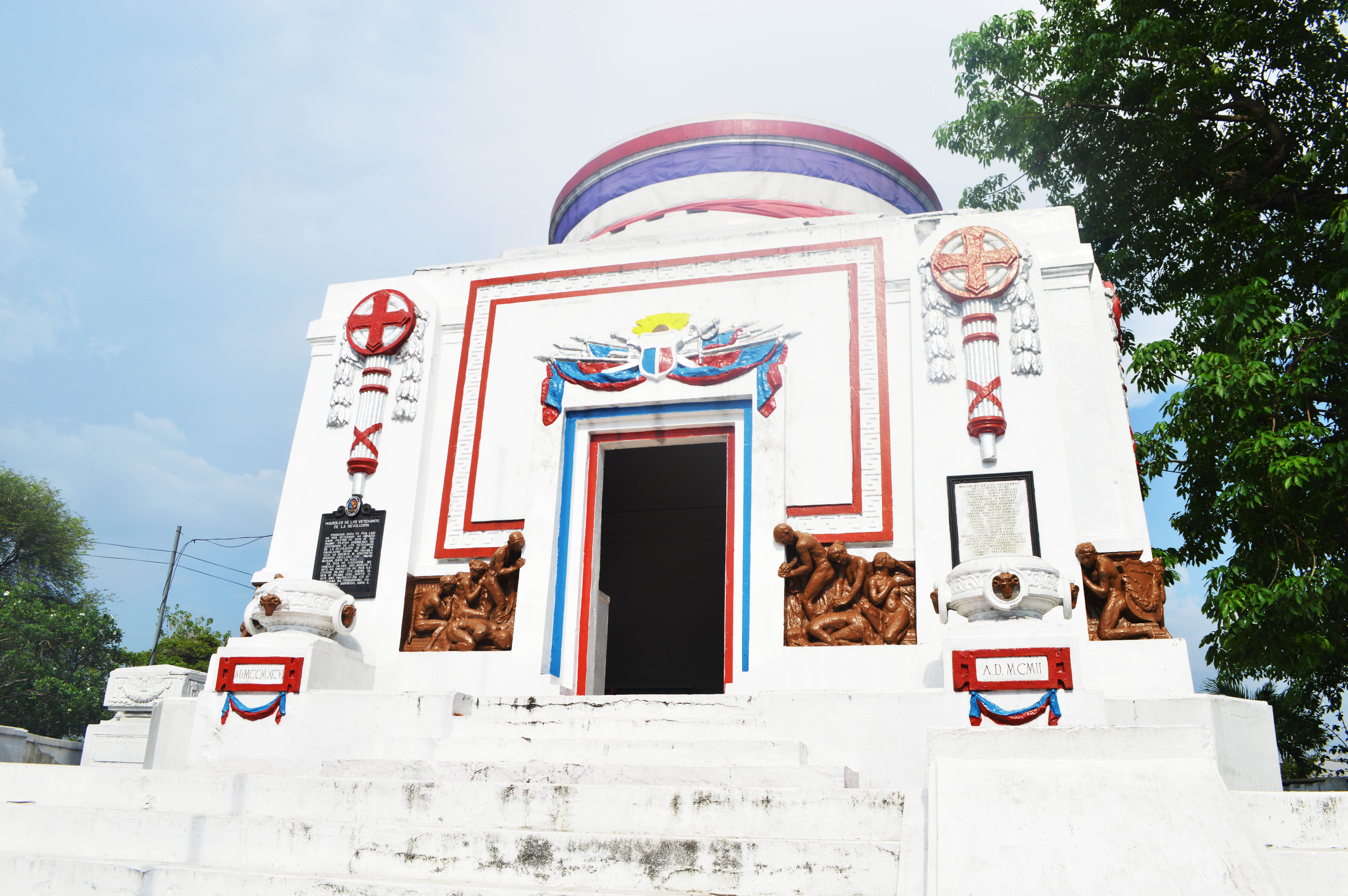
Mausoleum of the Veterans of the Revolution exterior view

The Association of Veterans of the Revolution (Spanish: Asociación de los Veteranos de la Revolución) is an association for the former soldiers and servicemen during the establishment of the Philippine Revolutionary Army who participated during the Philippine Revolution and the Philippine–American War.

Organized by former president Emilio Aguinaldo in 1912. The association secured pensions for its members and made arrangements for them to buy land in installments from the government. Baldomero Aguinaldo was named president of the organization during its inception, and served in this capacity until his death on February 4, 1915. Among those who received land from the government were Manuel Tinio, Pio Valenzuela, and Mariano Trias. Another project was the Mausoleum of the Veterans of the Revolution, a mausoleum constructed in Manila North Cemetery, designed by an architect Arcadio de Guzmán Arellano, inaugurated on May 30, 1920. General Mariano Noriel, Tomas Arguelles, and Pio del Pilar are some of the few who were interred inside the structure.
