= Arévalo de la Sierra =

- Municipality
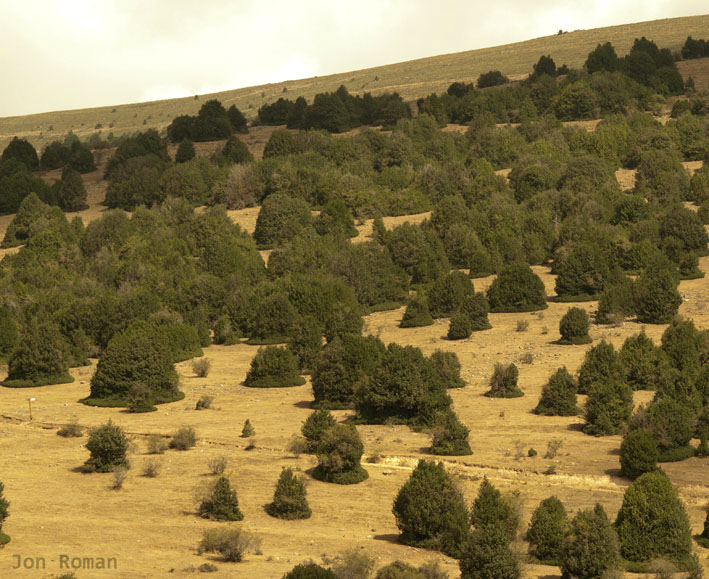

- Location in Spain. Arévalo de la Sierra (Spain)
- Country: Spain
- Autonomous community: Castile and León
- Province: Soria
- Municipality: Arévalo de la Sierra

Area
  - Total: 39 km^{2} (15 sq mi)

Population (2025-01-01)
  - Total: 71
  - Density: 1.8/km^{2} (4.7/sq mi)
- Time zone: UTC+1 (CET)
  - Summer (DST): UTC+2 (CEST)
- Website: Official website

Arévalo de la Sierra is a municipality located in the province of Soria, Castile and León, Spain. According to the 2004 census (INE), the municipality has a population of 94 inhabitants.

Demographic change of the municipality between 1991 and 2004
| 1991 | 1996 | 2001 | 2004 |
| 134 | 120 | 89 | 94 |
