= Arévalo History Museum =

Coordinates: 41°3′58.38″N 4°43′11.27″W

Museo de Historia de Arévalo
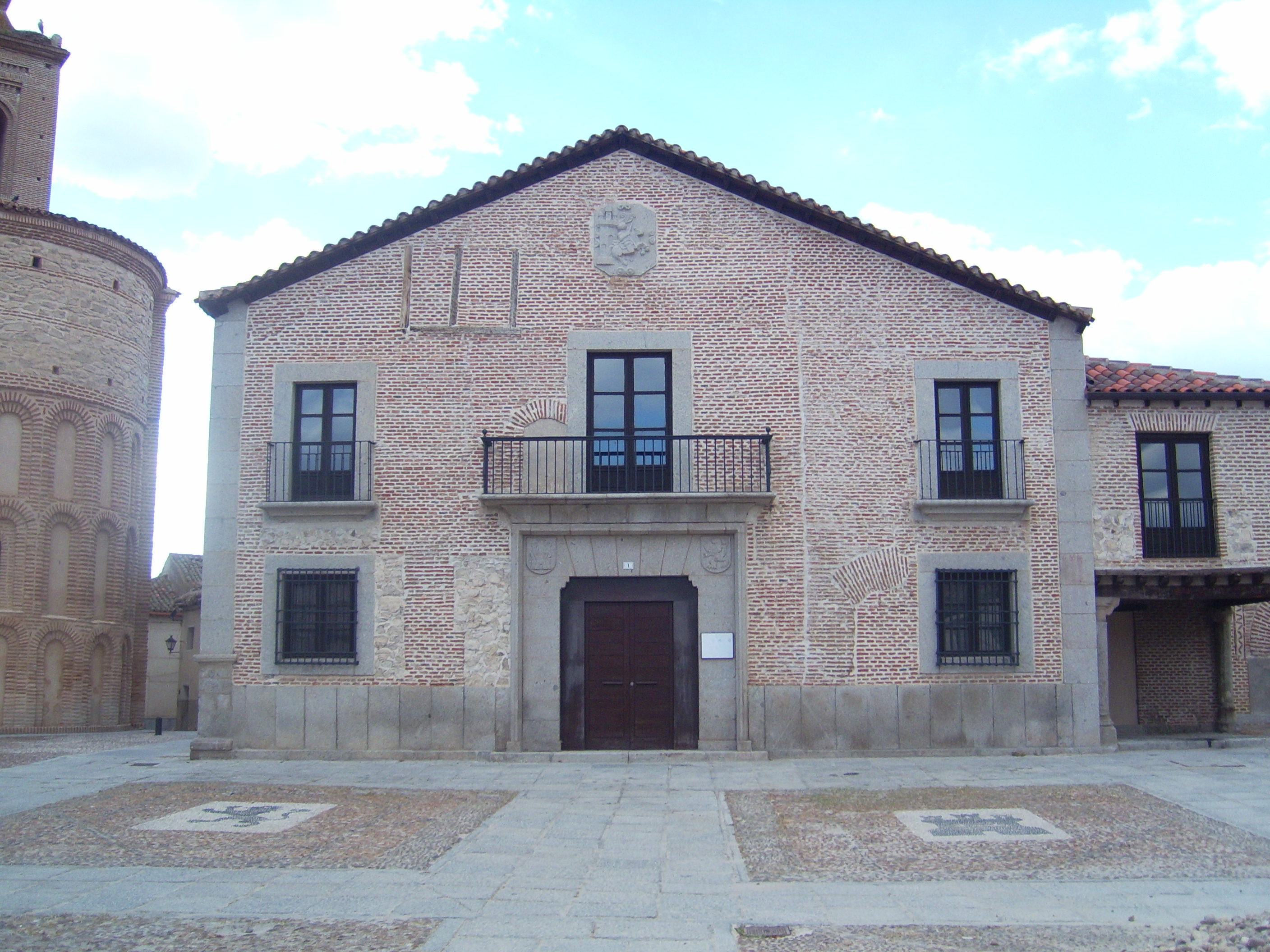
- Established: 2011
- Location: Arévalo, Spain
- Website: museodehistoriadearevalo.blogspot.com

The Museo de Historia de Arévalo or Arévalo History Museum in English (also known as Arevalorum), is a museum devoted to the history of the town of Arévalo in the province of Avila, Spain.

The town is known for its medieval buildings and the fact that Isabella I of Castile spent her childhood there. The museum is located in the ancient Sexmos´s House and is run by the Arévalo town hall.

== The collection ==
The Arévalo History Museum houses approximately one hundred pieces. The collection contains archaeological objects from the Chalcolithic period and objects from the time of the Roman Empire, as well as medieval, modern and contemporary pieces.

The museum also has several recreations of the town's main historic buildings.

The museum also has a hall dedicated to the heritage of Autun, France, which is the sister city of Arévalo and has been since 2005.
