= San Vicente de Arévalo =

- municipality
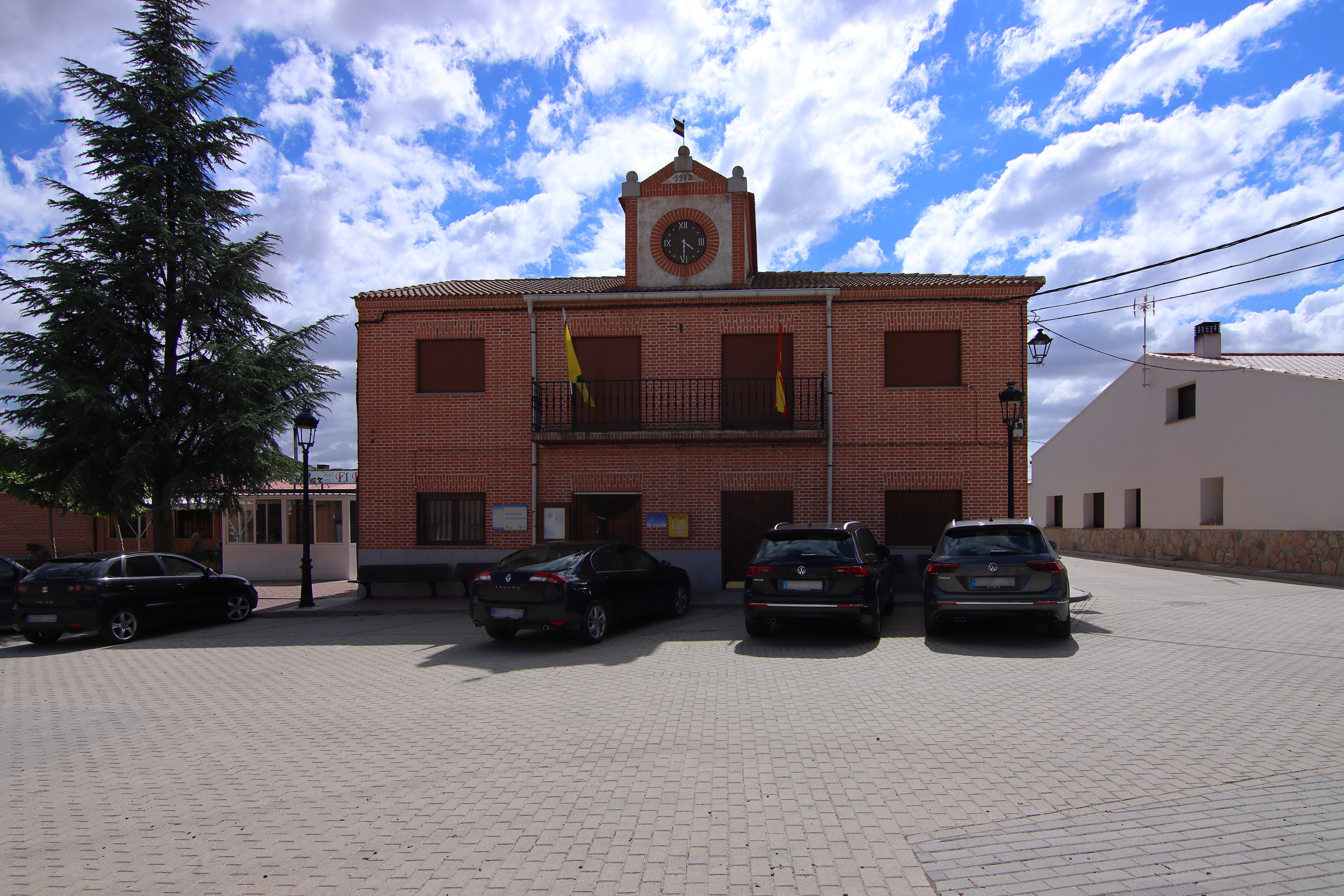
- Town hall

- Flag Coat of arms

- Location in Spain. San Vicente de Arévalo (Spain)
- Coordinates: 40°58′04″N 4°48′00″W
- Country: Spain
- Autonomous community: Castile and León
- Province: Ávila
- Municipality: San Vicente de Arévalo

Area
  - Total: 16.12 km^{2} (6.22 sq mi)
- Elevation: 877 m (2,877 ft)

Population (2025-01-01)
  - Total: 171
  - Density: 10.6/km^{2} (27.5/sq mi)
- Time zone: UTC+1 (CET)
  - Summer (DST): UTC+2 (CEST)
- Website: Official website

San Vicente de Arévalo (Spanish pronunciation: [sam biˈθente ðe aˈɾeβalo]) is a municipality located in the province of Ávila, Castile and León, Spain.

== Population ==
Historical population
Year	Pop.	±% p.a.
2023	500	—
2024	501	+0.20%
2025	516	+2.99%
Source: INE
