= Víctor Hugo Arévalo Jordán =

Bolivian writer

Víctor Hugo Arévalo Jordán (born December 23, 1946, in Cochabamba) is a Bolivian writer and noted university professor.

== Biography ==
At the age of four, he moved with his parents to La Paz, where he lived until 1982, when for family reasons he settled in the city of Santa Fe, Argentina.

== Notable works ==
- Los Augures
- La Puerta
- Réquiem
- La última sinfonia del mago
- Soledad, hoy me rompieron el ojete
- La noche de los elegidos
- Recuerdos y silencios
- Geometrías del dolor
- Recuerdos y silencios
- Testimonio
- Génesis
