= Melchora Aquino =

Filipina revolutionary known for her medically aiding revolutionaries

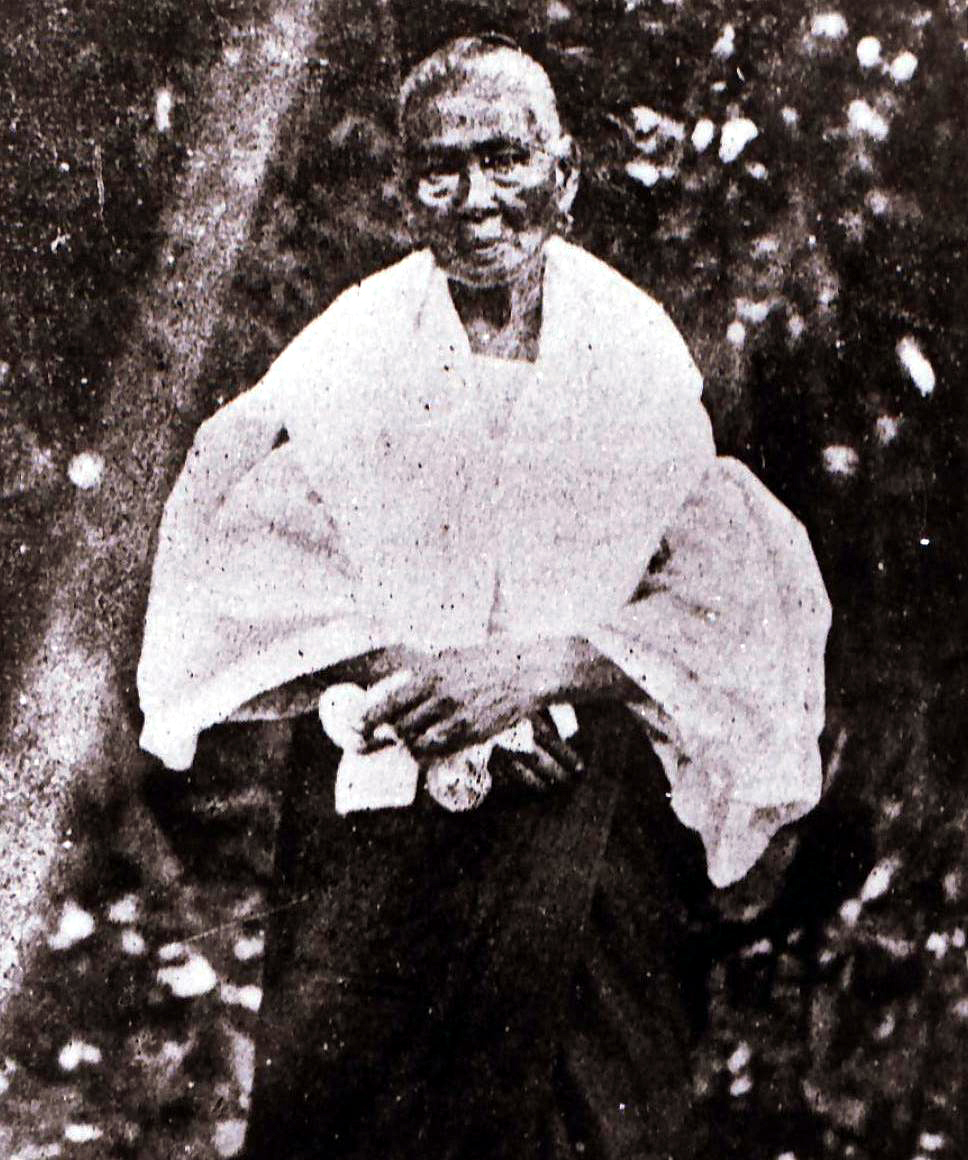
- Aquino in c. 1896
- Born: Melchora Aquino; January 6, 1812; Banlat, Kalookan, Tondo, Captaincy General of the Philippines, Spanish Empire
- Died: February 19, 1919 (aged 107); Banlat, Kalookan, Rizal, Insular Government of the Philippine Islands
- Resting place: Tandang Sora National Shrine, Quezon City
- Spouse: Fulgencio Ramos (died 1856)
- Children: 6

Melchora Aquino (January 6, 1812 – February 19, 1919) was a Filipino revolutionary. She became known as "Tandang Sora" ("tandang" meaning "old") because of her old age during the Philippine Revolution (1896-1899). She was also known as the "Grand Woman of the Revolution" and the "Mother of Balintawak" for her huge contributions.

== Early life and marriage ==
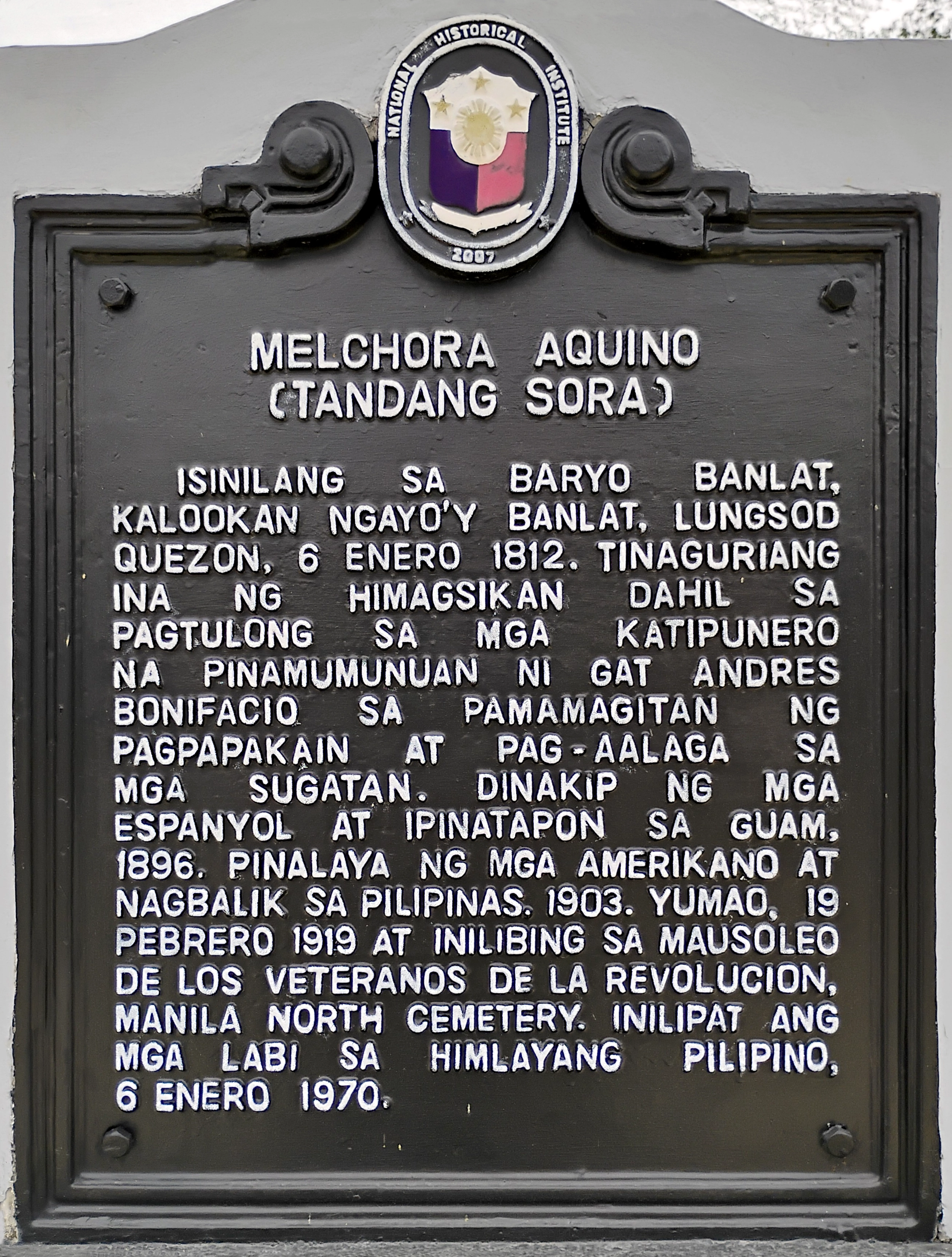
The historical marker installed by the National Historical Commission of the Philippines at the Melchora Aquino Shrine in Quezon City in 2007

Melchora Aquino was born on January 6, 1812 in Barrio Banlat, Caloocan (now Barangay Tandang Sora, Quezon City). She was named after Melchior, one of the Three Wise Men as she was born on the day of the Feast of Epiphany. She was the daughter of a peasant named Juan Aquino and Valentina Aquino. Despite not being able to go to school, she became literate at an early age. She was also a talented singer, often performing at local events and Masses. She was also often chosen to play the character Reyna Elena during the Santacruzan, a May procession festival held in the Philippines to celebrate the discovery of the True Cross by Empress Helena

== Involvement in the revolution ==
She also ran a store, in her hometown which served as a refuge to the ill and injured revolutionaries. She also gave them food, medical care, maternal advice and prayers.

Her home was used as a secret meeting place for the Katipuneros (revolutionaries) in August 1896. Because of her maternal nature and support of the revolution she was given many titles including Woman of the Revolution, Mother of Balintawak,, of the Philippine Revolution and Tandang Sora (Tandang meaning old from the Tagalog word matandâ). She and her son Juan Ramos were also present during the Cry of Balintawak and saw the historic event of the cedulas (tax certificates) being torn up.

She was arrested by the Guardia Civil on August 29th 1896 after it was discovered by the Spanish authorities that she was involved in the revolution and knew where the Katipuneros were. She was first imprisoned at the house of a cabeza de barangay in Pasong Putik, Novaliches. She was then moved to Bilibid Prison in Manila. While she was imprisoned she was interrogated rigorously but refused to give any information. On September 2nd 1896 she was deported to the Mariana Islands, Guam, by order of Governor-General Ramón Blanco.

== Death ==
Aquino died at her daughter Saturnina's house in Banlat on February 19, 1919, at the age of 107. Shortly after her death, she was accorded full state honors, bringing overdue recognition to her revolutionary contributions after years of obscurity. Her remains were first interred at the Mausoleum of the Veterans of the Revolution at the Manila North Cemetery. They were later transferred to the Himlayang Pilipino Memorial Park in Quezon City in 1970, and finally reinterred at the Tandang Sora National Shrine in 2012

== Legacy ==
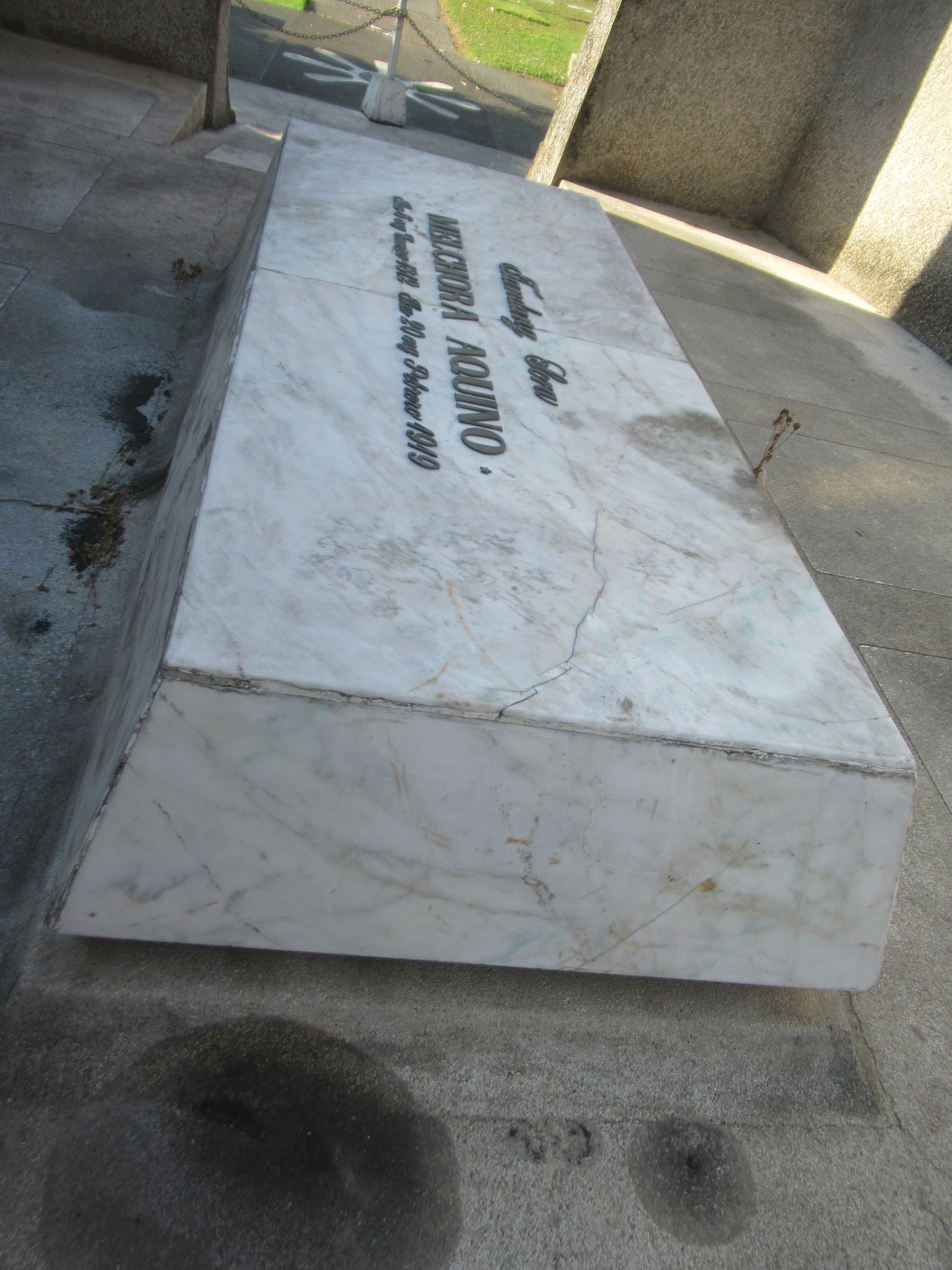
Aquino's grave at the Himlayang Pilipino Memorial Park (Quezon City).

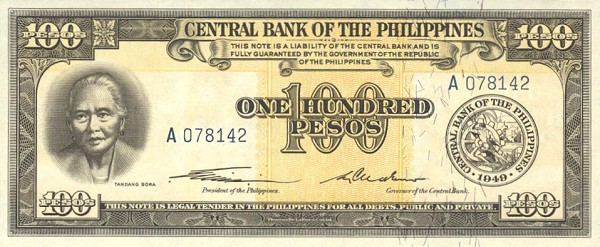
Melchora Aquino, as depicted on the English Series 100 pesos banknote.

As a token of gratitude, a Quezon City barangay and a road were named after Tandang Sora. Her profile was also placed in the Philippines' five-centavo coin from 1967 to 1994. She was the first Filipina who appears on a Philippine peso banknote, in this case, a 100-peso bill from the English Series (1951–1966). Tandang Sora Street in the city of San Francisco is named in her honor.

In 2012, on the celebration of her 200th birth anniversary, the Quezon City local government decided to transfer Tandang Sora's remains from Himlayang Pilipino Memorial Park to the Tandang Sora National Shrine. They also declared 2012 as the Tandang Sora Year.

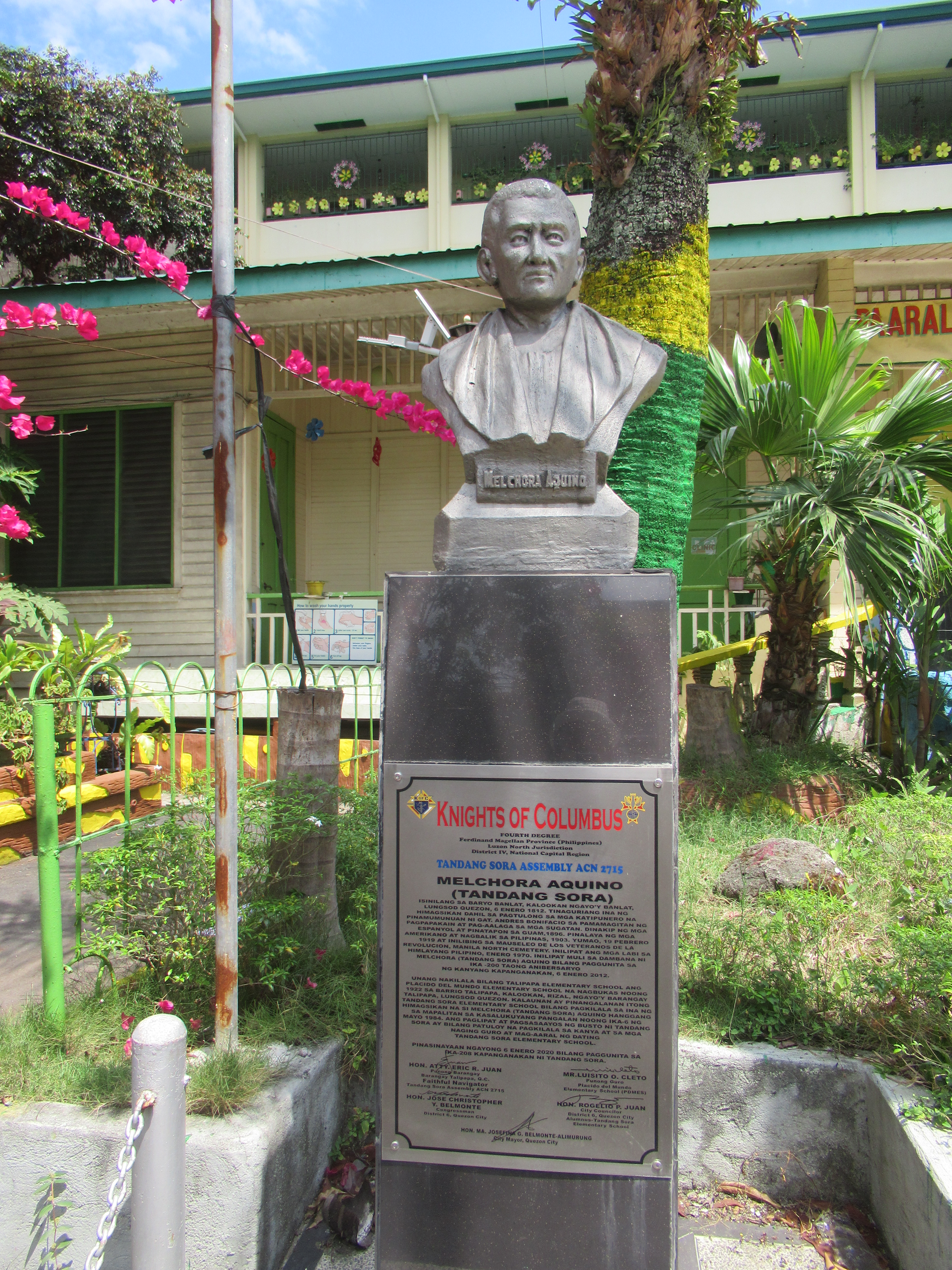
Bust at Placido del Mundo Elementary School in Novaliches, Quezon City

Her descendants carry different surnames, with almost all living in Novaliches and Tandang Sora districts in Quezon City as well as in Guam such as Figueroa, Ramos (her husband's surname), Geronimo, Eugenio, Cleofas and Apo.

A Philippine Coast Guard 97-meter (318 ft) vessel was named after her, the BRP Melchora Aquino.

== In popular culture ==
- Portrayed by Angelita Loresco in the 2013 TV series Katipunan.
- Portrayed by Erlinda Villalobos in the 2014 film Bonifacio: Ang Unang Pangulo.
- Referenced in the song "Babae" by Inang Laya.
- A picture frame of Melchora Aquino was featured in the music video of "Pa-pa-pa palaban" by the girl group G22.
