= Daniel Arévalo Gallegos =

Mexican politician

- Born: 21 May 1962 (age 64); Mexico City, Mexico
- Occupation: Politician
- Political party: PRI

Daniel Raúl Arévalo Gallegos (born 21 May 1962) is a Mexican politician affiliated with the Institutional Revolutionary Party. As of 2014 he served as Deputy of the LIX Legislature of the Mexican Congress as a plurinominal representative replacing Roberto Campa.
