= Philippine Dental Association =

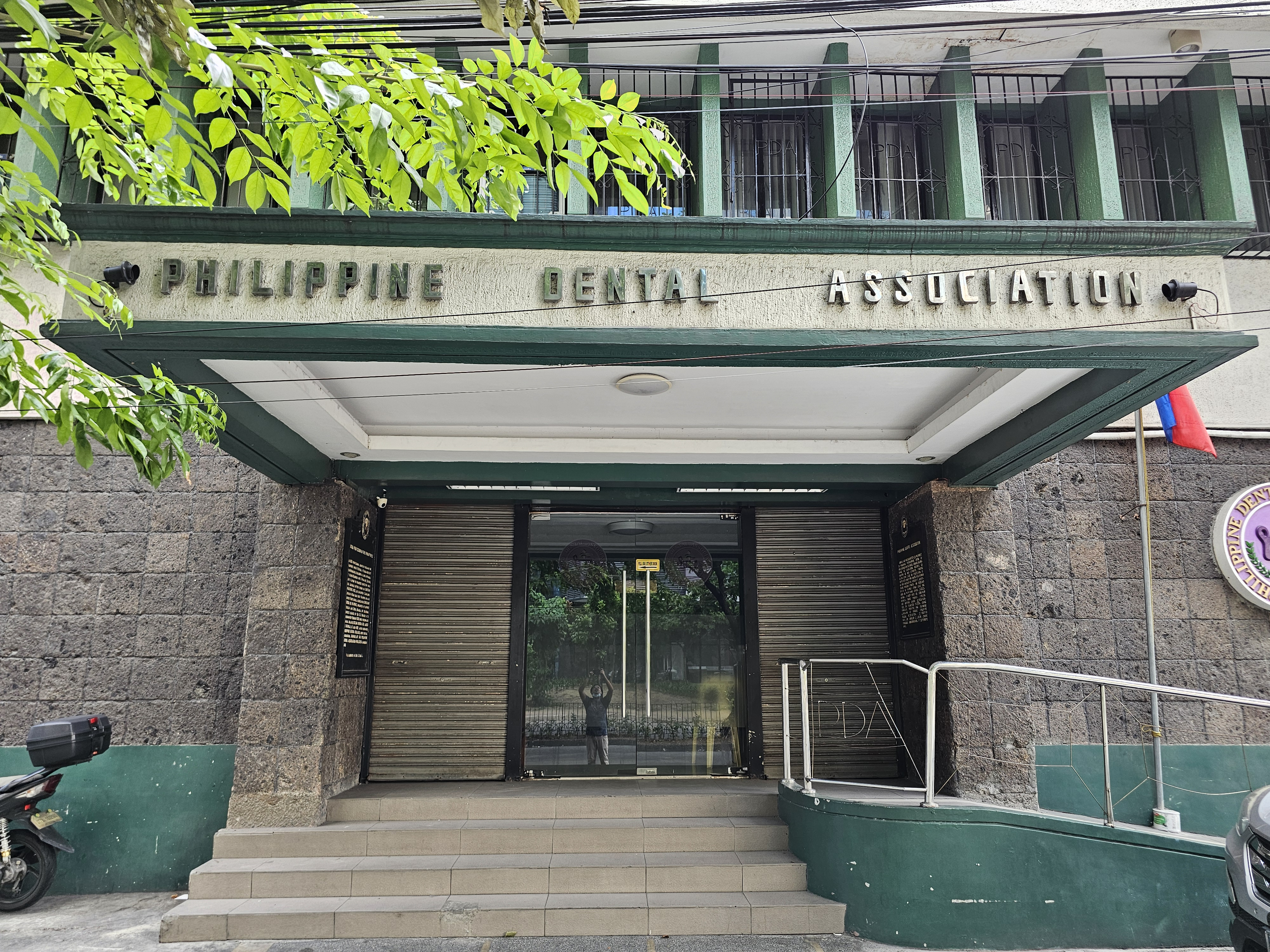
- Philippine Dental Association Building along Ayala Avenue Extension, Makati
- Founded: June 11, 1908; 118 years ago
- Founded at: Escolta, Manila, Philippines
- Type: Professional association
- Headquarters: Makati, Metro Manila, Philippines
- Website: pda.com.ph
- Formerly called: National Dental Association; Sociedad dental de Filipinas

The Philippine Dental Association (PDA) is an association of professional dentists in the Philippines. It dates back to 1908 with the establishment of Sociedad dental de Filipinas. After World War II, on August 12, 1945, this organization merged with the National Dental Association (founded in 1924) to form the Philippine Dental Association (PDA). It was inaugurated on September 7, 1945. The first issue of the PDA's official publication, the Journal of the Philippine Dental Association, was published in January 1948. In 1961, Dr. Luz C. Macapanpan was elected as the first female president of the PDA.

The PDA offers and encourages the development and further education of dental professionals as well as provide legal assistance. Its headquarters is located at the Philippine Dental Association Building, Ayala Ave. Makati.

== Marker from the National Historical Institute ==
The historical marker entitled Philippine Dental Association was installed in 2008 at the PDA Building. It was installed by the National Historical Institute (NHI).

Original Filipino Text	Translated English Text	Photo
UMIRAL ANG PAGDEDENTISTA SA PILIPINAS SA PANAHONG PREKOLONYAL AYON SA EBIDENSYANG ARKEOLOHIKAL. ITINURO BILANG BAHAGI NG EDUKASYONG MEDIKAL SA PANAHON NG MGA ESPANYON. ITINATAG BILANG ISANG LEGAL NA PROPESYON, 10 ENERO 1903. BINUO ANG UNANG KALUUPUNAN NG MGA TAGASULIT DR. ROBERT T. OLIVER, UNANG PANGULO. ITINATAG ANG SOCIEDAD DENTAL DE FILIPINAS UPANG ITAAS ANG ANTAS NG PROESYONG DENTAL, ESCOLTA, MAYNILA, 11 HULYO 1908; DR. BONIFACIO AREVALO, UNANG PANGULO. ITINATAG ANG NATIONAL DENTAL ASSOCIATION, 1925; DR. FRANCISCO TECSON, UNANG PANGULO. PINAG-ISA ANG DALAWANG SAMAHAN AT NAGING PHILIPPINE DENTAL ASSOCIATION, 12 AGOSTO 1945; DR. JOAQUIN C. LAGAO, UNANG PANGULO. PINASINAYAAN, 7 SETYEMBRE 1945.	Dentistry was practiced in pre-colonial Philippines, according to archaeological evidences. It was taught as part of the Spanish medical education. Established as a legal profession, 10 January 1903. The first group of examiners was established, with Dr. Robert T. Oliver as first president. Sociedad Dental de Filipinas was established along Escolta on 11 June 1908, to elevate the dental profession; Dr. Bonifacio Arevalo, first president. National Dental Association was established in 1925; Dr. Francisco Tecson, first president. The two organizations merged to form the Philippine Dental Association, 12 August 1945; Dr. Joaquin C. Ladao, first president. Inaugurated, 7 September 1945.	

== See also ==
- Dentistry in the Philippines
