= Montejo de Arévalo =

- Municipality
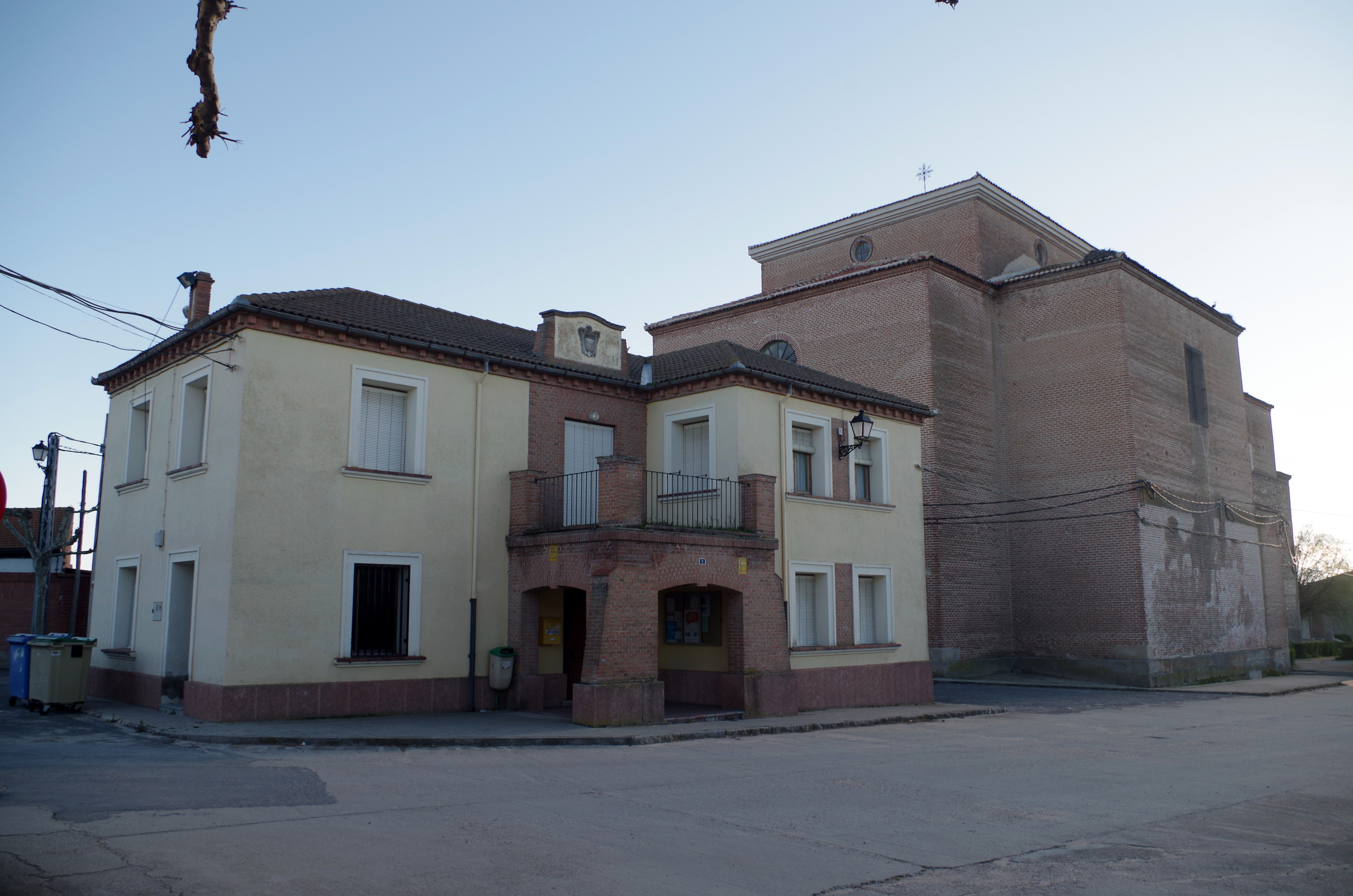
- Town Hall and Saint Thomas church.

- Location in Spain. Montejo de Arévalo (Spain)
- Coordinates: 41°08′24″N 4°39′53″W
- Country: Spain
- Autonomous community: Castile and León
- Province: Segovia
- Municipality: Montejo de Arévalo

Area
  - Total: 35.95 km^{2} (13.88 sq mi)
- Elevation: 860 m (2,820 ft)

Population (2025-01-01)
  - Total: 158
  - Density: 4.39/km^{2} (11.4/sq mi)
- Time zone: UTC+1 (CET)
  - Summer (DST): UTC+2 (CEST)
- Website: Official website

Montejo de Arévalo is a municipality located in the province of Segovia, Castile and León, Spain. According to the Spanish National Statistics Institute, in 2022, the municipality has a population of 171 inhabitants.

It was known as Montejo de la Vega de Arévalo until the beginning of the 20th century, due to its geography.

== Demography ==
Population
1900	1950	2000	2002	2004	2006	2008	2010	2012	2014	2016	2018	2020	2022
614	689	294	276	262	258	244	231	215	205	190	185	171	171

== Landmarks ==
- Santo Tomas de Aquino's church: It's a gothic-mudéjar temple.
- Casas solariegas
- Virgen de los Huertos' church: It was edified in the same spot where appeared the sculpture of the virgin that gives name to the church. That sculpture was moved to Santo Tomás de Aquino's church, but it continued returning to that spot until the church was built.
- Chain
