= Nava de Arévalo =

- municipality
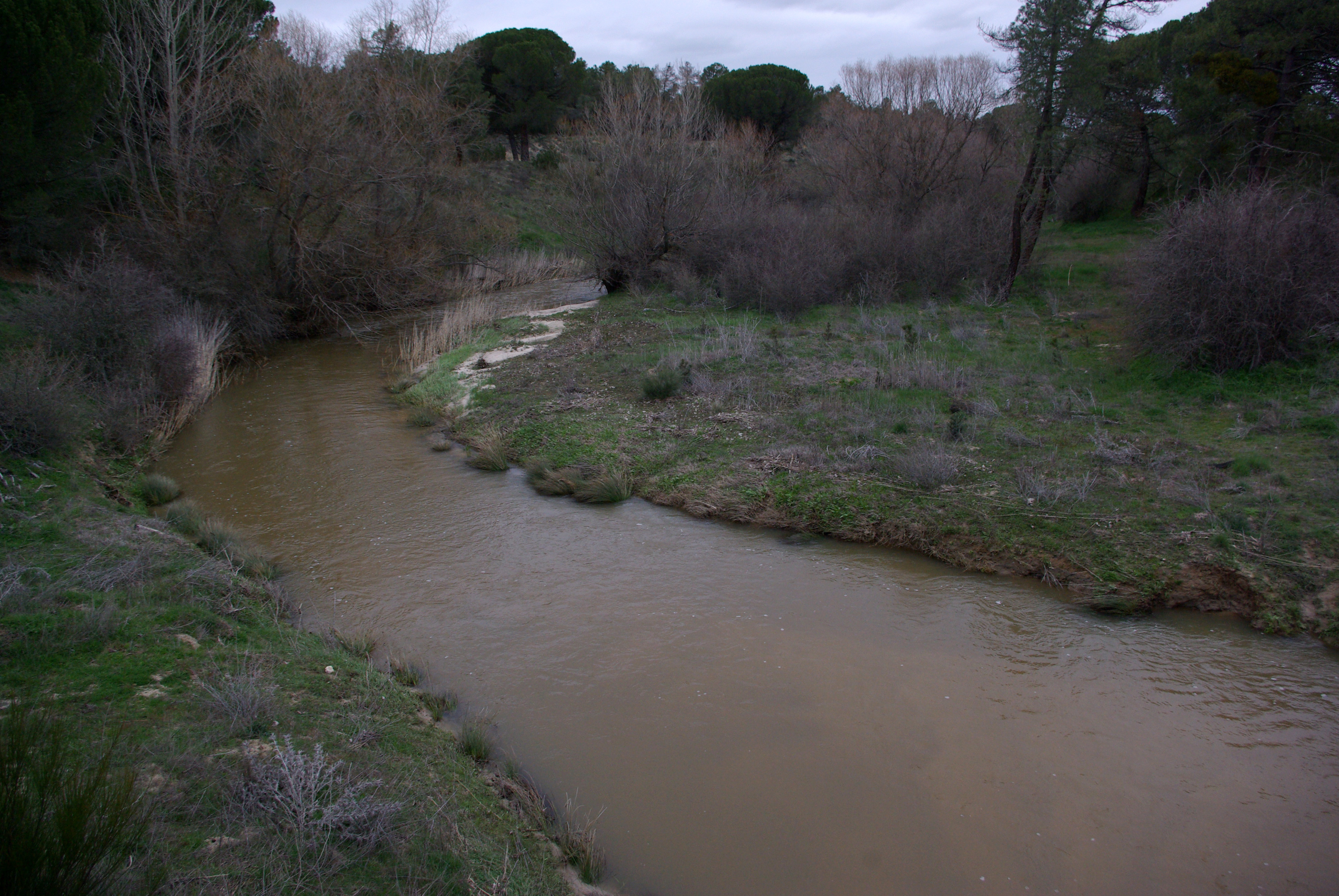
- River Arevalillo near Nava de Arévalo
- Flag Coat of arms
- Location in Spain. Nava de Arévalo (Spain)
- Coordinates: 40°58′42″N 4°46′33″W
- Country: Spain
- Autonomous community: Castile and León
- Province: Ávila
- Municipality: Nava de Arévalo

Area
  - Total: 58 km^{2} (22 sq mi)

Population (2025-01-01)
  - Total: 647
  - Density: 11/km^{2} (29/sq mi)
- Time zone: UTC+1 (CET)
  - Summer (DST): UTC+2 (CEST)
- Website: Official website

Nava de Arévalo is a municipality located in the province of Ávila, Castile and León, Spain.

== Population ==
Historical population
Year	Pop.	±% p.a.
2023	677	—
2024	663	−2.07%
2025	647	−2.41%
Source: INE
