= Juan Arévalo =

Assembly Member of the Declaration of Philippine Independence

Juan Arévalo

Juan Arévalo was an Assembly Member of the Declaration of Philippine Independence, which was proclaimed in 1898. He was the son of Bonifacio Flores Arévalo (founding president of the Sociedad Dental de Filipinas) and Trinidad Arévalo. His remains are buried with other Assembly Members of the Declaration of Philippine Independence, at the Mausoleo de los Veteranos de la Revolución in Manila North Cemetery.
