= Bueno Arévalo Julio Fernando =

Ecuadorian director, composer, and musicologist

Bueno Arévalo Julio Fernando, also known as Julio Bueno, is a well-respected director, musical composer and musicologist born in Loja, Ecuador.

He was director of the prestigious Teatro Nacional Sucre located in the capital city of Quito.
