= Bonifacio Arévalo =

- Born: Don Bonifacio Arévalo y Flores; 14 May 1850; Biñan, Laguna, Captaincy General of the Philippines
- Died: 13 December 1920 (aged 70); Insular Government of the Philippine Islands
- Occupations: Dentist; Sculptor
- Known for: Filipino patriotism
- Spouses: Trinidad Arévalo; Benita Ocampo
- Children: Juan Arevalo via Trinidad
- Parents: Justo Arévalo; Esperanza Flores-Arévalo

Bonifacio Arévalo y Flores (14 May 1850 - 13 December 1920) was a Filipino ilustrado, dentist, sculptor, propagandist, and an ardent patron of music and theater. He was the treasurer of La Liga Filipina and the founder of the Sociedad Dental de Filipinas, which is now known as the Philippine Dental Association.

== Family & Education ==
Born on May 14, 1850, to Esperanza Flores and Justo Arévalo, Bonifacio Arévalo was a sculptor, an ardent patron of music and theater, and a propagandist. At the age seven, he lost his father, who was also a sculptor, and he was consequently placed under the care of his uncle Don José Arévalo (Capitán municipal of Biñan in 1833 and was popularly known as "Capitan Cheng-Cheng") whom himself was a sculptor and a dentist (The Philippine Dental Association considers him as the first Filipino dentist). His aunt, Eulalia Asunción, taught him the art of woodcarving.

He acquired an education through his uncle's beneficence and, upon finishing, worked as an aide at the San Juan de Dios Hospital. While undergoing apprentices at the hospital, he learned the basics of dentistry under his uncle's tutelage. In 1876, he obtained the title of cirujano ministrante, and soon after put up a clinic along Elizondo Street in Quiapo. In 1888, he took, and passed, an examination given to dentists in the country.

A profitable practice allowed Arévalo to pursue his other interests: sculptor and music. His sculptures may be classified according to three categories: religious pieces, exemplified by La Purísima Concepción, Calvario, and San Rafael; sculptured vignettes that portray native practices and events, such as his Zapatero, Magmamais, and Bayad; and sculptured busts of famous personages. Wood particularly lanite and santol, was his favorite material for sculpture.

Bonifacio Arévalo married Trinidad Arévalo and they had a son named Juan Arevalo, who was one of the Philippine Revolutionaries in Cavite. Juan Arevalo was also an Assembly Member of the Declaration of Philippine Independence, which was proclaimed in 1898. Juan Arevalo married Maria Basa, and they had a son named Bonifacio Basa Arévalo (II), who later also became a dentist. Juan Arevalo's remains are buried with other Assembly Members of the Declaration of Philippine Independence, at the Mausoleo de los Veteranos de la Revolución of the Manila North Cemetery.

Bonifacio Arévalo also had a son with Carmen Ordax, who was named Bonfiacio Ordax Arévalo (III) who became a chemist.

When Trinidad Arévalo died, Bonifacio married Benita Ocampo. They had one daughter.

The Arevalo ancestral house is in Quiapo, Manila (where Dr. Jose Rizal dined in with Bonifacio Arévalo). It was subsequently passed to the Herrera Family, after Don Juan Arevalo died and his wife Maria Basa married a certain Herrera. Maria Basa Herrera (who was then Maria Basa Arévalo) had children with his new husband. One of those children is Judge José Herrera .

== Significance in Philippine History and Culture ==
In July 1892, he became the treasurer of La Liga Filipina, an organization founded by José Rizal, under the aim of supporting the Propaganda Movement's publication, La Solidaridad.

Jose Rizal's testimony on a trial:
On November 20, 1896, there appeared before the Honorable Court and his Secretary, the accused, and after he had been admonished to tell the truth, declared:
José Rizal Mercado y Alonso, of age, single, a physician, resident of Calamba, province of Laguna, had never before been indicted.
Q: Do you know Bonifacio Arévalo?
A: Yes, because one Sunday I ate dinner in his home, but since then, I did not see him again.

After José Rizal was deported to Dapitan, La Liga was disbanded and in August 1894, Arévalo joined a new association called the Cuerpo de Compromisarios, that chose to carry on the peaceful reforms rather than support a revolution or the radical organization (Katipunan) of Andrés Bonifacio (former La Liga member) that wanted Philippine Revolution separation from the Spanish Empire. Nevertheless, they were still associated to the organization that when the arrests were made to capture the members and supporters of the Katipunan, Arévalo was one of captives and was imprisoned for nine months.

After his release in 1898, he was appointed to the Asamblea Consultiva together with C. Arellano, Pedro Paterno, and Isaac de Ríos under its aim of convincing the revolutionaries to support Spain's war against the Americans. He was designated colonel of the militia of the revolutionary army and detailed in Sampaloc, Manila, by General Emilio Aguinaldo. He had been serving as the intendente of the second zone of operations of the revolutionary army until the early part of the Philippine–American War when he was jailed by the American forces.

When he was released he decided to lead a quiet life and dedicated himself to his dental practice and other concerns such as business. Aside from practicing dentistry, he also engaged in cultural activities as a sculptor and a patron of the arts. He tried to engage in business by establishing a number of small Sari-sari stores or retail stores that would try to compete with the more established stores of Chinese merchants. This venture failed within a short time. Later, he intended to erect a textile factory patterned after the factories he saw in Japan. On September 27, 1909, Arevalo went to Japan to study the operation of a textile factory preparatory to the proposed acquisition of machinery for his planned establishment of a textile plant in the Philippines. The plan never materialized. In the same year he formed an organization of hat-makers and local weavers.

== Dentistry ==
His skill in dentistry was passed to him by his foster parent, his uncle Don Jose Arévalo. In 1876, Bonifacio opened a dental clinic in Quiapo, Manila. In 1908, he founded the Sociedad Dental de Filipinas, now known as the Philippine Dental Association. He was one of the very few licensed dentists of Manila during that time.

== Sculpture ==
As a sculptor, his works mainly fall into one of three categories: those with religious subjects or motifs; tipos del pais (country genre) on pieces depicting local customs, scenes, and occupations; and portraits. He mostly worked with wood. His favorite medium was the santol wood. He trained Mariano Madriñan of Paete, who gained fame through his participation in the Amsterdam Exposition in 1882 where his Mater Dolorosa won raves. Bonifacio Arévalo won the Gold Medal from the 1895 Exposición Regional de Filipinas, and in 1902 the Hanoi Exhibition Awards.

== Music & Theater ==
As a patron of music and theater. In 1890 his lucrative practice of dentistry allowed him to save the Pasig Band from being dissolved. He reorganized the group, bought new instruments, and hired Marcelino Asunción, the former director of a Spanish military band, to lead it. It was later known as the "Banda Arévalo". It was one of the bands that performed for the Revolutionary Government of the First Philippine Republic in Malolos. It served as the official band of the Revolutionary Government in 1898. Arévalo also managed an Italian opera company during its tour in the country. As a patron of the theatre arts he organized an actor's company and regularly staged productions of the then very popular moro-moro plays, like Ibong Adarna, Jason at Medea, and Juan Tiñoso. Some of the actors he trained, and who were truly in need of a benefactor such as himself, were Julio Mariano, Ildefonsa Alianza, Felisa Cleofas, and Pantaleon Aldana.

== Notable achievements ==
- Founding President of the Sociedad Dental de Filipinas
- 1902 - Hanoi Exhibition Awards
- 1895 - Gold Medal, Exposición Regional de Filipinas

== Works ==
- La Purisima Concepcion (The Immaculate Conception)
- San Rafael (St. Raphael)
- Cristo de Velasquez (Christ of Velasquez)
- Ecce Homo (Behold the Man)
- Calvario (Calvary)
- Bayad (Payment)
- Magmamais (Corn Vendor)
- Zapatero (The Cobbler)
- Mga Pulubi (Beggars)
- Bust of Governor General Ramon Blanco
- Bust of Cayetano Arellano
