= Arévalo =

- Municipality
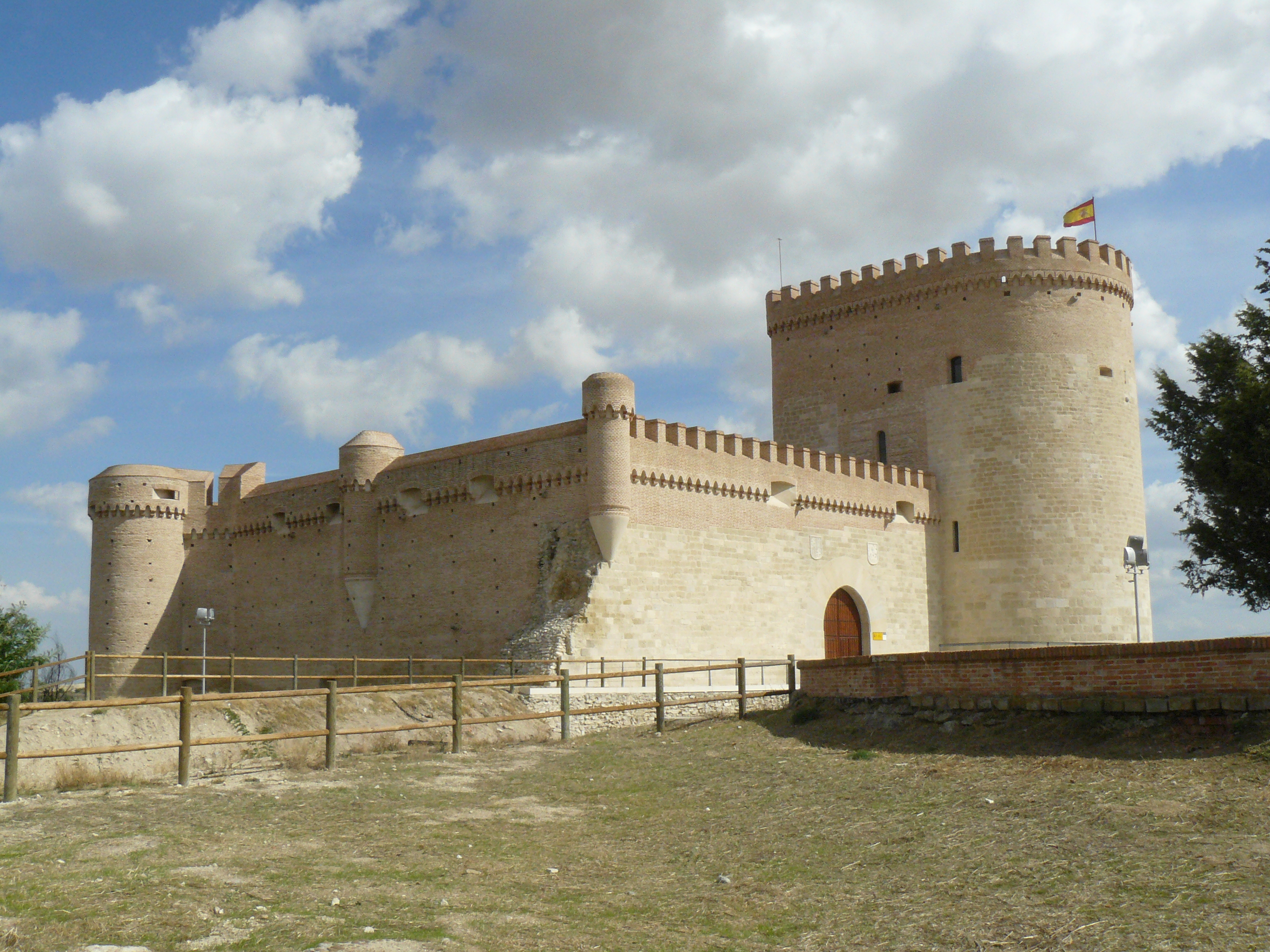
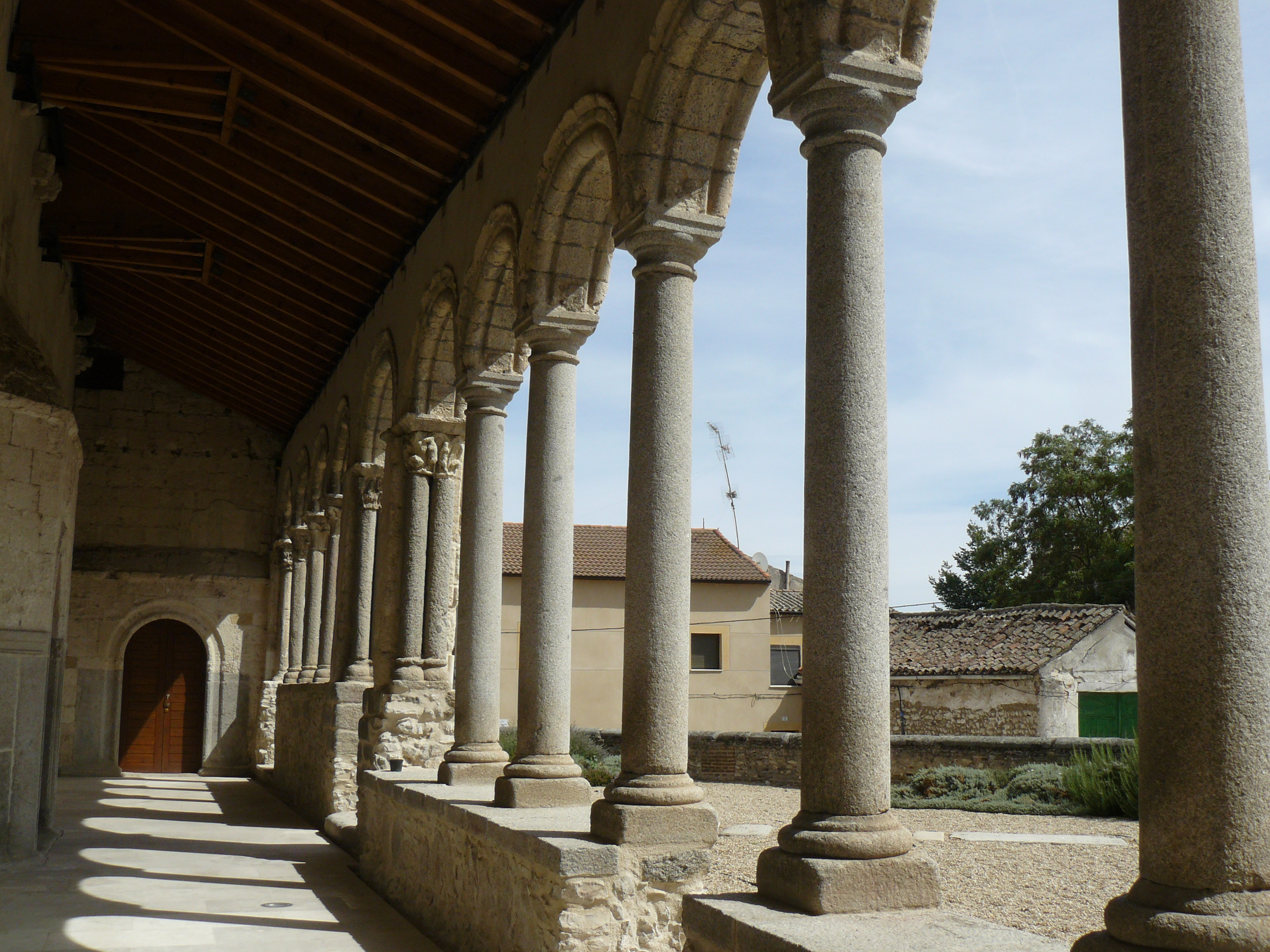
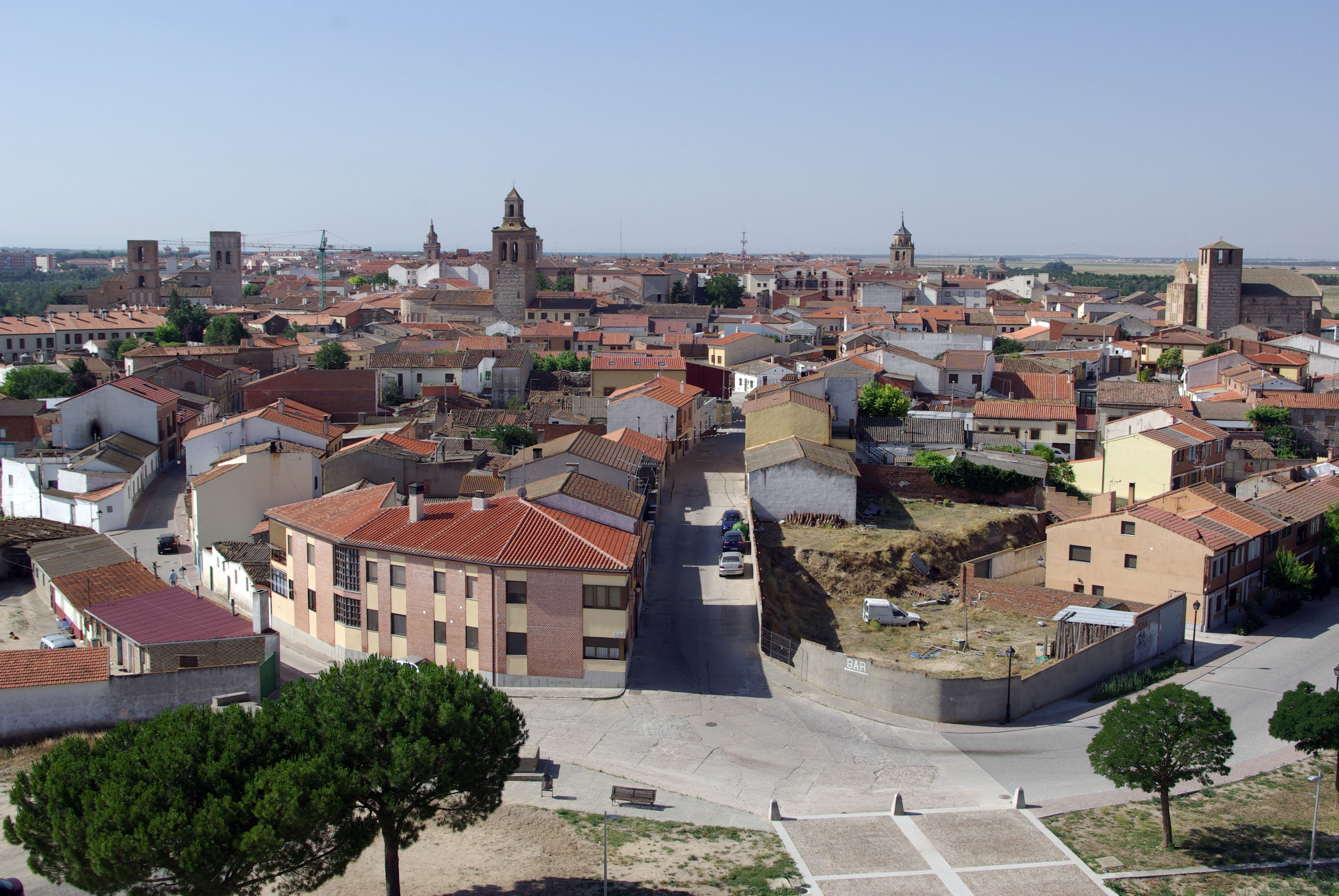
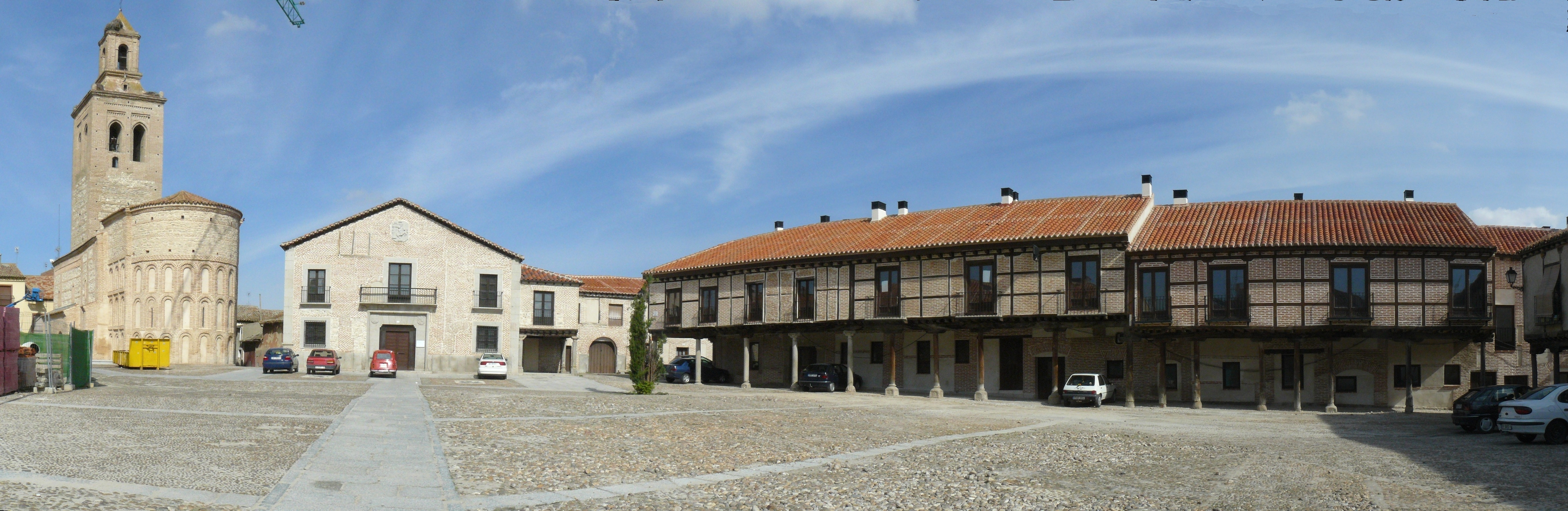
- 1) Castle of Arévalo; 2) Church of San Martín; 3) Partial view of Arévalo; 4) View of the main square.

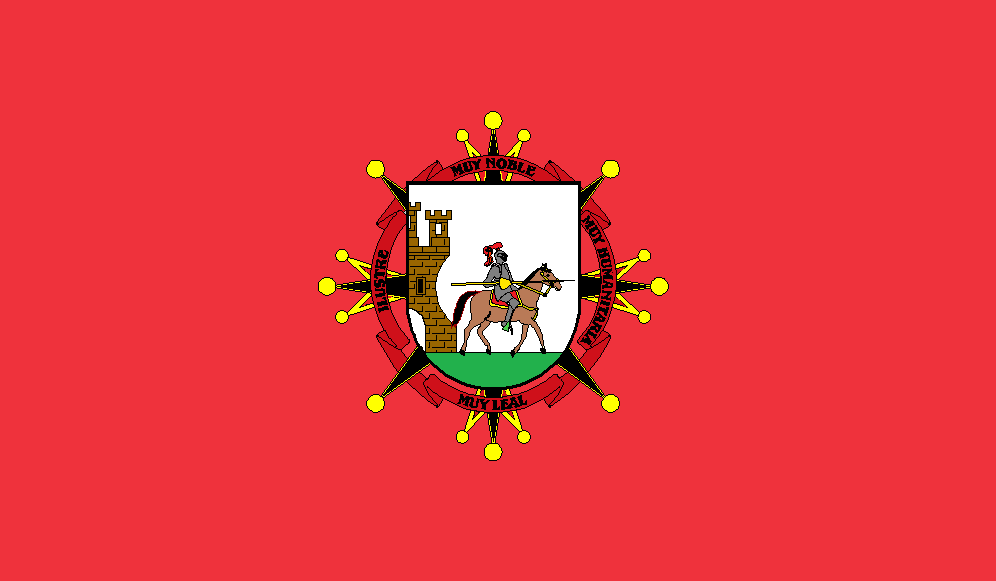
- Flag Coat of arms
- Interactive map of Arévalo
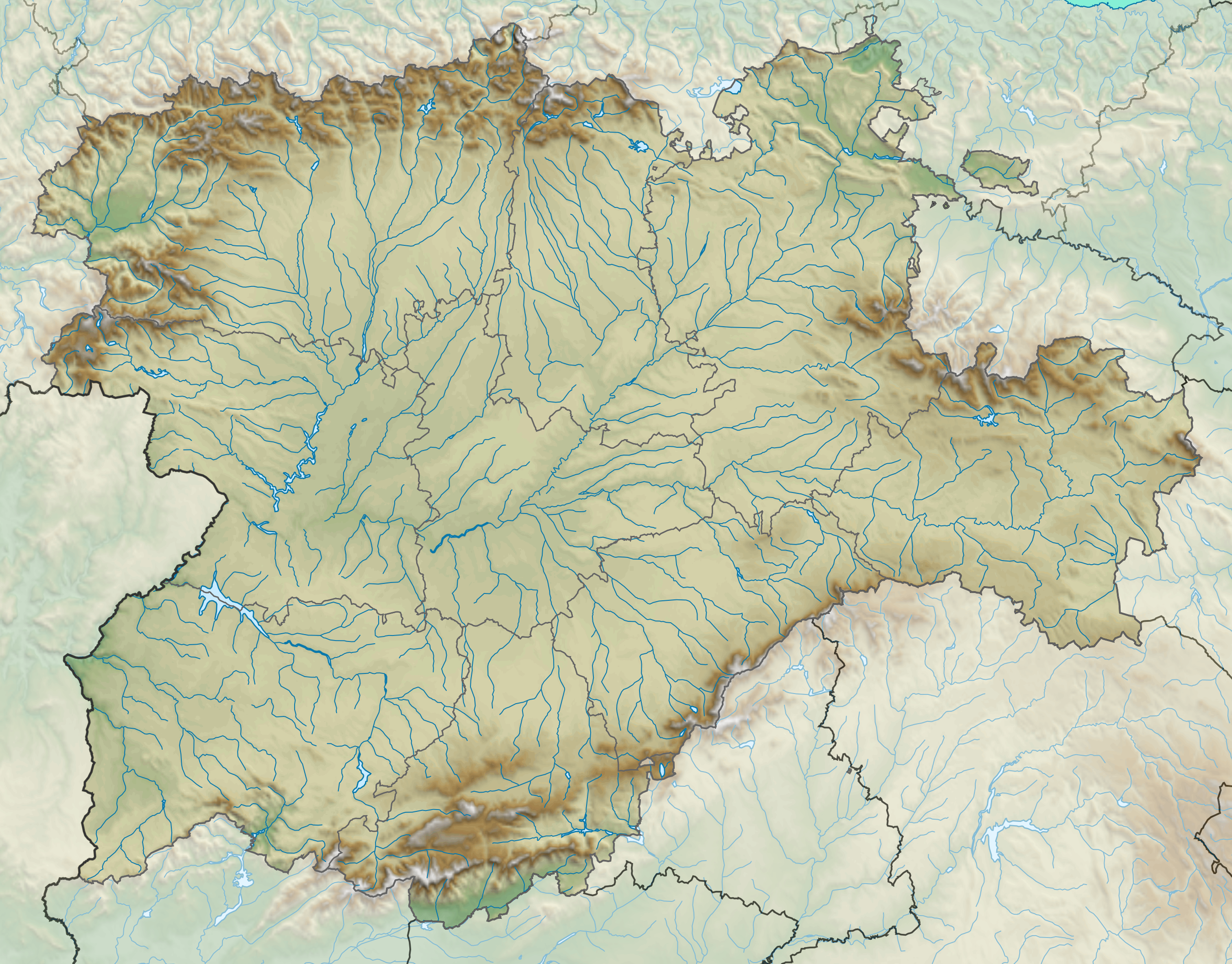
- Location within Castile and León Location within Spain
- Coordinates: 41°04′00″N 4°43′00″W
- Country: Spain
- Autonomous community: Castile and León
- Province: Ávila

Area
  - Total: 46.07 km^{2} (17.79 sq mi)
- Elevation: 820 m (2,690 ft)

Population (2025-01-01)
  - Total: 7,851
  - Density: 170.4/km^{2} (441.4/sq mi)
- Website: Official website

Arévalo is a municipality of Spain belonging to the province of Ávila in the autonomous community of Castile and León. Lying on the northern Meseta at the confluence of the Adaja and the Arevalillo rivers, it is the most populous settlement of La Moraña.

== Placename ==
The name came from the Celtic word arevalon, meaning "place near the wall."

== History ==
In medieval times, Arévalo was the head of the comunidad de villa y tierra of the same name.

The town boasted of a sizeable mudéjar community in the late middle ages. Having its own Faqīh and constituting an Aljama, the morería was among those that contributed the most to the Crown of Castile from a fiscal standpoint. (Note: Arévalo was the hometown and birthplace of an author simply known as the Young Man ("Mancebo") of Arévalo, one of the most famous known crypto-Muslim authors after the forced conversions of Muslims in Spain.) It also had a Jewish community before the expulsion of Jews from the Crown of Castile in 1492.

== Location and population ==
It is located at an altitude of 820 meters and is near the junction of the two rivers Adaja and Arevalillo. Its encompassed area is 46.07 km^{2}.

Historical population
Year	Pop.	±% p.a.
2023	7,768	—
2024	7,830	+0.80%
2025	7,851	+0.27%
Source: INE

== Monuments ==
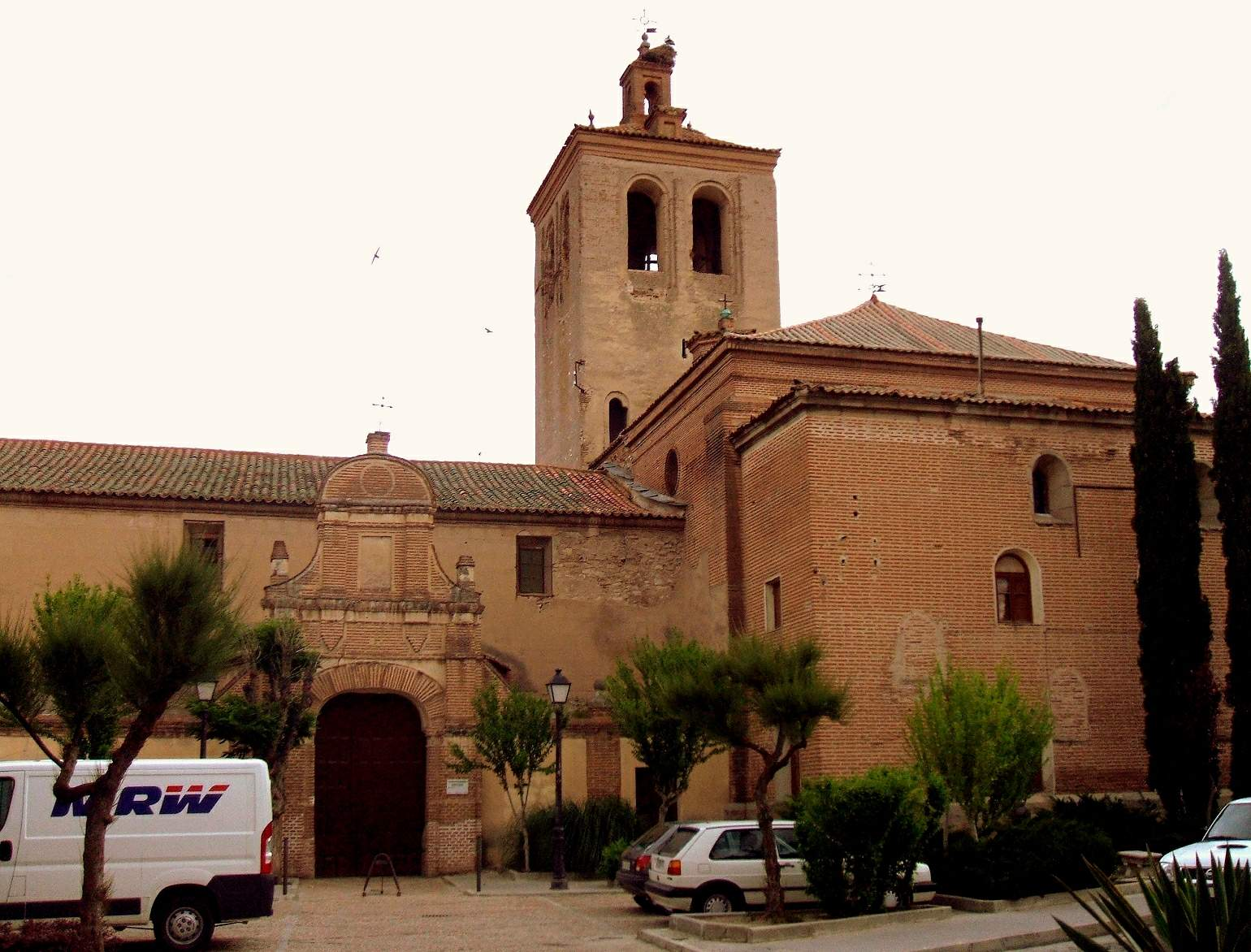
Iglesia de El Salvador

The government of Spain declared the historic centre of Arévalo a Historic-Artistic site due to its many examples of Mudéjar art.

- La Muralla. The city walls, of which only the north part can be appreciated, as the east part is practically destroyed. It is currently being restored. They originally had five doors and formed a triangle with the castle in its superior vertex. The two sides of the triangle are formed by the rivers Arevalillo and Adaja. The base of the triangle was protected by a double wall and a pit.
- The parish church of Santo Domingo de Silos.
- The church of San Juan.
- The church of Santa María whose tower is crossed by the street of the same name.
- The church of San Miguel which possesses a great collection of works of art.
- The church of San Martín or the Torres Gemelas (Twin Towers). Formerly a mosque, it conserves a peculiar style.
- The church of El Salvador (The Savior) in which the floats for the Easter processions are kept.

In addition to this there are many other brick monuments from different eras. The palace of the Gutiérrez de Altamirano, the house of the militia, the palace of Cárdenas, the palace of río Ungria, the palace of Real, the palace of Ballesteros Ronquillo, the palace of Sedeño and the palace of general Vicente del Río. There are also diverse convents, the castle in which the Museum of Cereal is located, plaza del Arrabal, plaza Del Real, plaza de San Pedro and plaza de la Villa.

== Commuting ==
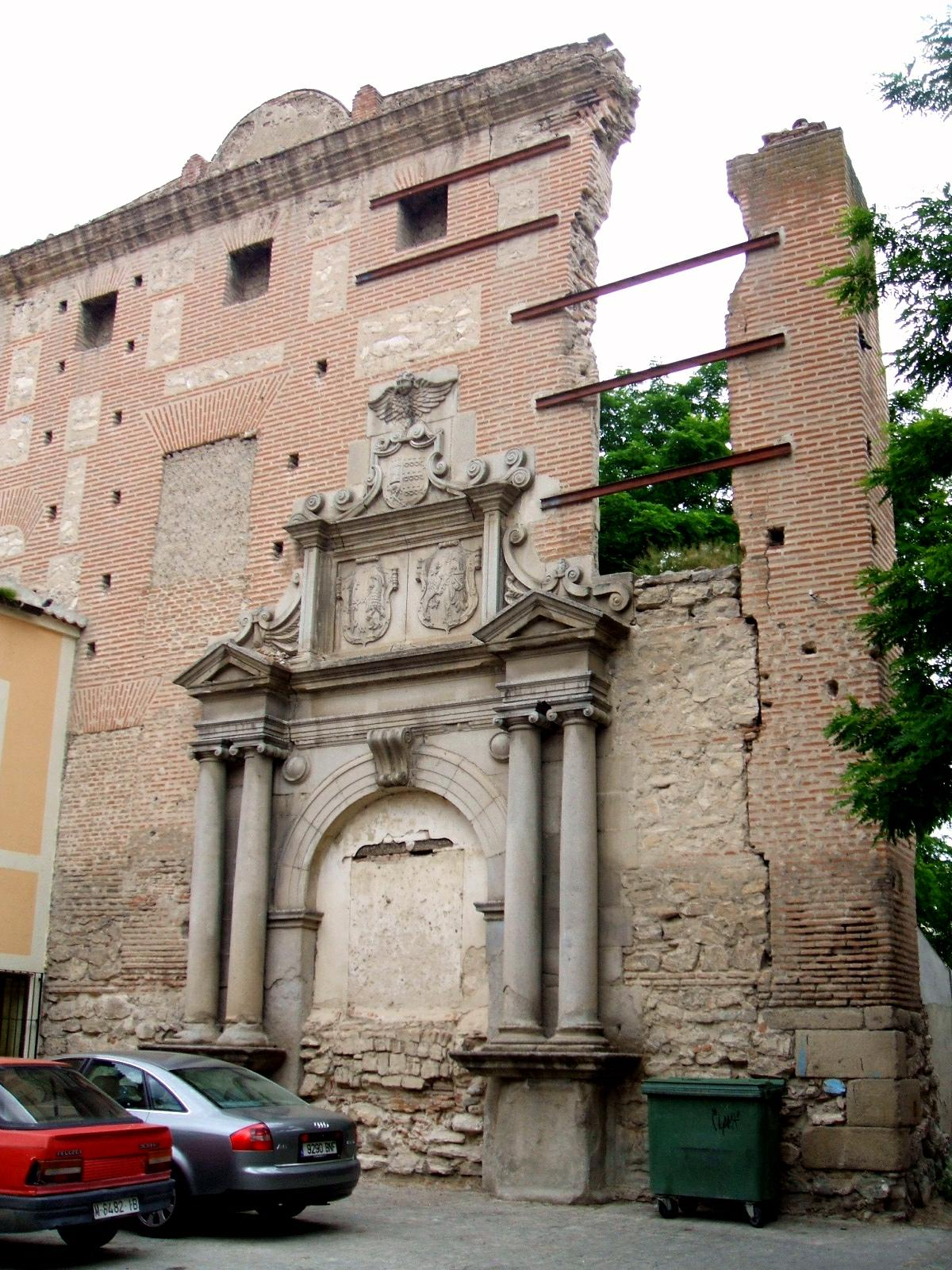
Remains of the Casa-Palacio de Ballesteros Ronquillo

The highway A-6 unites Madrid with A Coruña and some of the population uses this transit system to commute to the main cities of the northwest peninsula.

Also the train line Madrid-Hendaya has a stop in this town. From this line, the town is communicated thanks to its numerous regional trains with cities such as Madrid, Ávila, Medina del Campo, Valladolid, Burgos, Palencia, Vitoria and Santander.

== Economy ==
Farming, cattle ranching, lumber industry, a small but powerful industrial sector and other businesses which are fundamentally based upon the processing of agriculture are the main forms of employment.

== Education ==
There are 3 schools, C.P. La Moraña, C.P. Los Arevacos and el Amor de Dios, which operate in this district. Additionally there are 3 centers for secondary education, Los Salesianos, I.E.S Adaja y I.E.S Eulogio Florentino Sanz.

== Places of interest ==
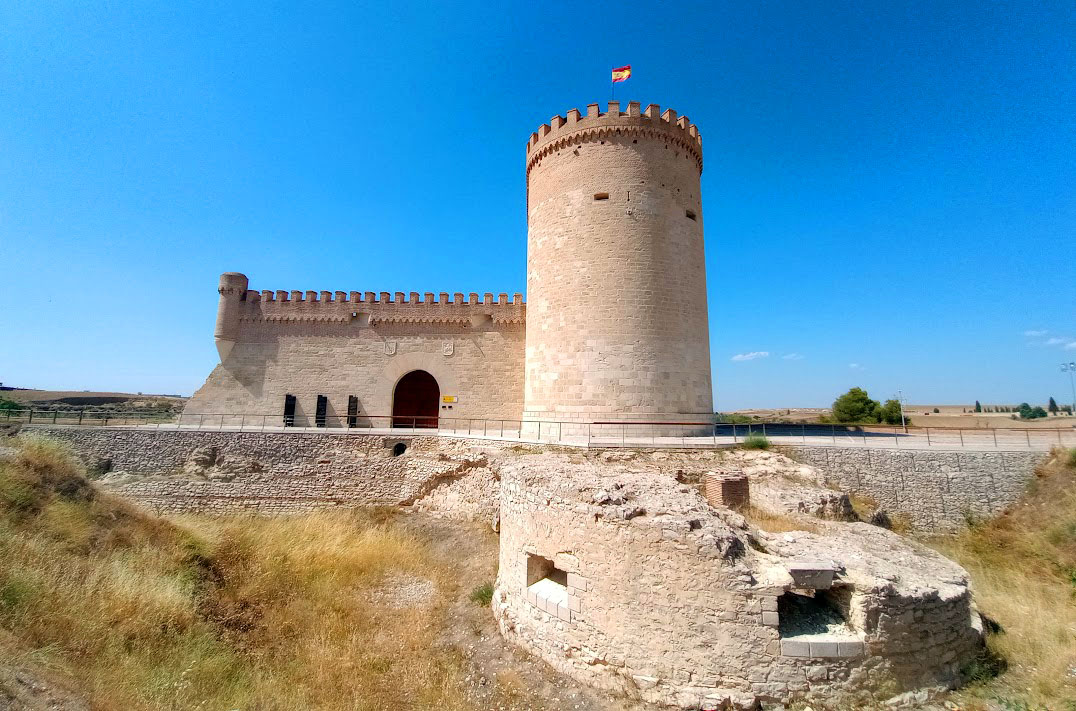
Castle of Arévalo, built between the 12th and 16th centuries.

In addition, Arévalo has other places of interest like la formidable Avenida Emilio Romero, a sports facility, a new bridge constructed, the plaza of the villa, (in Spanish, Plaza de la Villa), the municipal library, the museum of el cereal, the history of Arévalo museum, the nature center in la Plaza del Real, and the Tuesday market in the fairground.

== Traditions of the town of Arévalo and festivals ==
=== Festivals ===
Arévalo celebrates the festival of its patron saint San Victorino on 7 July, with its traditional parade of cabezudos, the opening of its fairground, and bullfights in the town's streets. The festivals conclude with fireworks from the castle until 11pm.

== Sister cities ==
- Autun, France
