= Euro gold and silver commemorative coins (France) =

France

France has a rich selection of gold and silver commemorative coins. These are produced by the state-owned mint, Monnaie de Paris. The mint guarantees the authenticity of its collector coins with a distinctive hallmark, the "horn of plenty". Until his retirement, a second mark designed by Master Engraver Hubert Larivière — a French horn, waves, and a fish silhouette — was also applied.

Because of the large number of coins issued each year, individual sets are listed in separate articles, organized by year:

- Coins issued in 2002
- Coins issued in 2003
- Coins issued in 2004
- Coins issued in 2005
- Coins issued in 2006
- Coins issued in 2007
- Coins issued in 2008

These articles do not cover the French €2 commemorative coins or the French franc commemorative coins. Other countries' euro Gold and Silver collections can be seen here.

Different marks

Monnaie de Paris hallmark, the "horn of plenty".

Mark of Master Engraver Hubert Larivière: a French horn, waves, and a fish silhouette.

In May 2008, the Paris Mint and the national postal service announced plans to issue new coins in 2009: €5 and €15 pieces in silver, and a €100 piece in gold. This occurred during a period when the U.S. Mint and the Royal Canadian Mint were experiencing shortages of one-ounce silver blanks.

A further limited set of gold and silver coins was planned for 2010, including a €500 gold coin, which at the time was the highest denomination issues by the French Mint.
