= Commemorative coin =

Coins issued to commemorate some particular event or issue

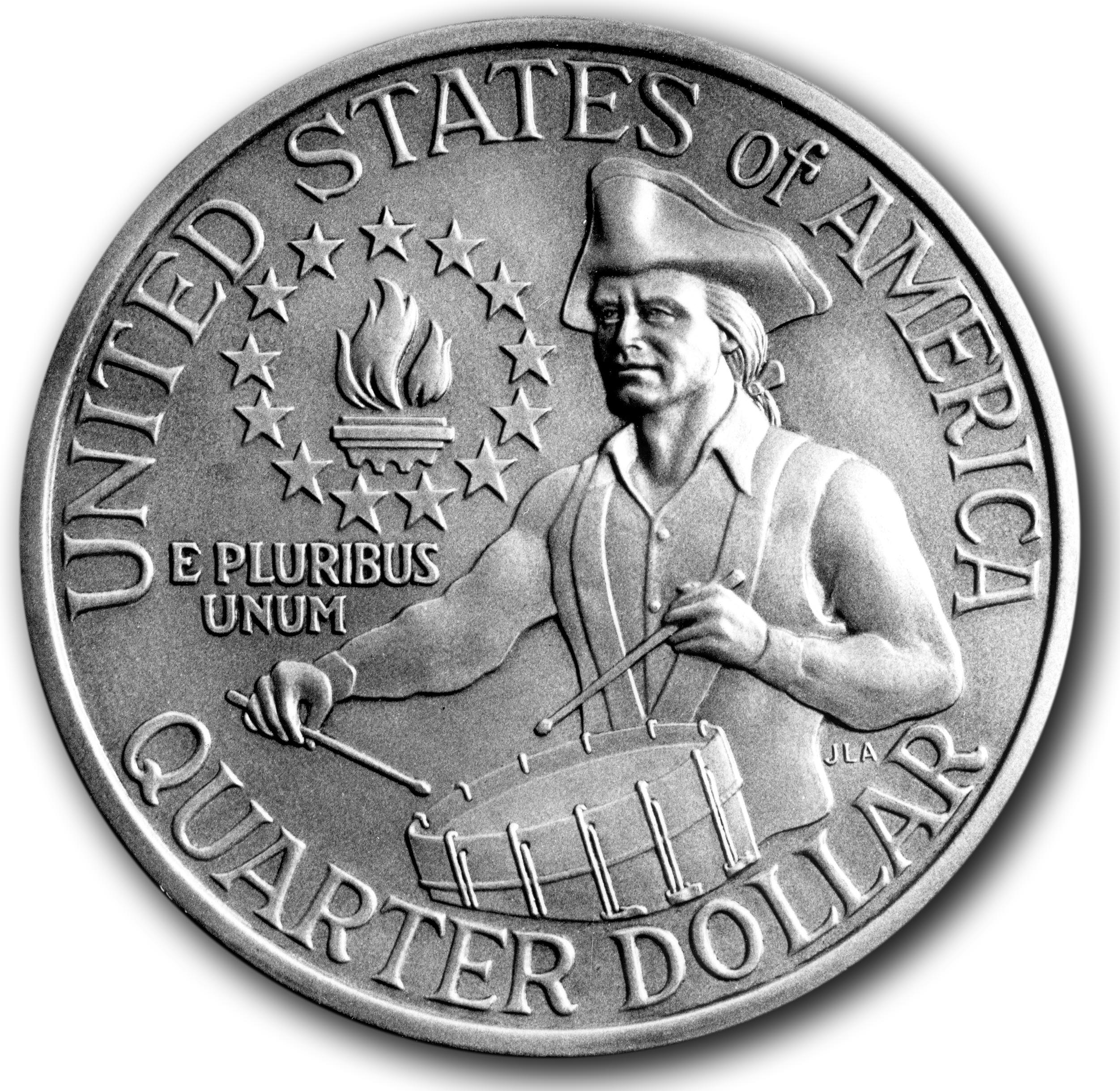
The US Bicentennial quarter is an example of a circulating commemorative coin. It is one of the most common commemorative coins, with over 1.6 billion minted, and as a result is still in regular circulation.

A commemorative coin is a coin issued to commemorate some particular event or issue with a distinct design with reference to the occasion on which they were issued. Some coins of this category serve as collector's items only, while most commemorative coins are for regular circulation.

== Subcategories ==
Commemorative coins can be seen as being of one of three types:

- Regular issue coinage are the normal coins intended to be used in commerce every day and are typically issued with the same design for several years, e.g. euro coins.
- Circulating commemoratives are intended to be used for commerce, but the design will only be issued for a limited time to commemorate an event, anniversary, person or location, among other items. Examples include the €2 commemorative coins and U.S. 50 State Quarters.
- Non-circulating legal tender (NCLT) are coins which are legal tender, and thus can in theory be used to purchase goods or services, but are not intended to be used in such a manner. Rather, they are intended as collector's items with numismatic value, and are often produced in gold or silver, either in uncirculated condition or with a proof finish.

== History ==
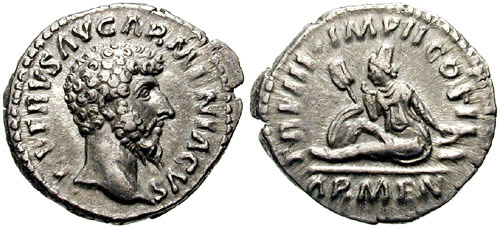
Coin issued during the reign of Roman emperor Lucius Verus (161–169) to celebrate his victory against Vologases IV of Parthia. The reverse shows the mourning personification of Armenia.

Historically, the coins issued by any state have always reflected the current political or economic situation. Many ancient and pre-modern coins certainly commemorate events in contemporary times. For instance, Roman coins often have references to military campaigns and the defeat of foreign powers. These reverse types often symbolically represent the subordination of recently conquered territories to Roman authority. Such coins are examples of ancient political propaganda. The Roman Empire may be represented by a proud warrior 'raising' an undersized figure, representing the defeated enemy.

Throughout history, coins have commonly been issued on special occasions, without necessarily citing that occasion explicitly. In some cases, emergency money have been issued under unfavourable conditions, such as a city under siege. Such emergency coins were issued in Vienna in 1529, while the city was besieged by the troops of the Ottoman Empire. Due to the conditions at the time, such coins are frequently minted on square flans, rather than round ones (it was easier and quicker to produce a square flan than a round one). European square coins of this era are known by their German name 'klippe'. Coins might also be issued with the specific purpose of financing a military campaign, or for the payment of tribute or war indemnity by a feudal lord to his sovereign.

During recent centuries, specially prepared coins have been issued to proclaim the coronation of a new monarch. Such coins are known as 'largesse' coins. This type of coins were issued in India during the Mughal era (the 'nisar' coinage), and in Europe in the age of absolutism. In Europe, such coins were scattered from the royal chariot, to achieve attention and applause from the public. In Sweden, coins of this type were issued as late as 1873 (known as "kastpenning").

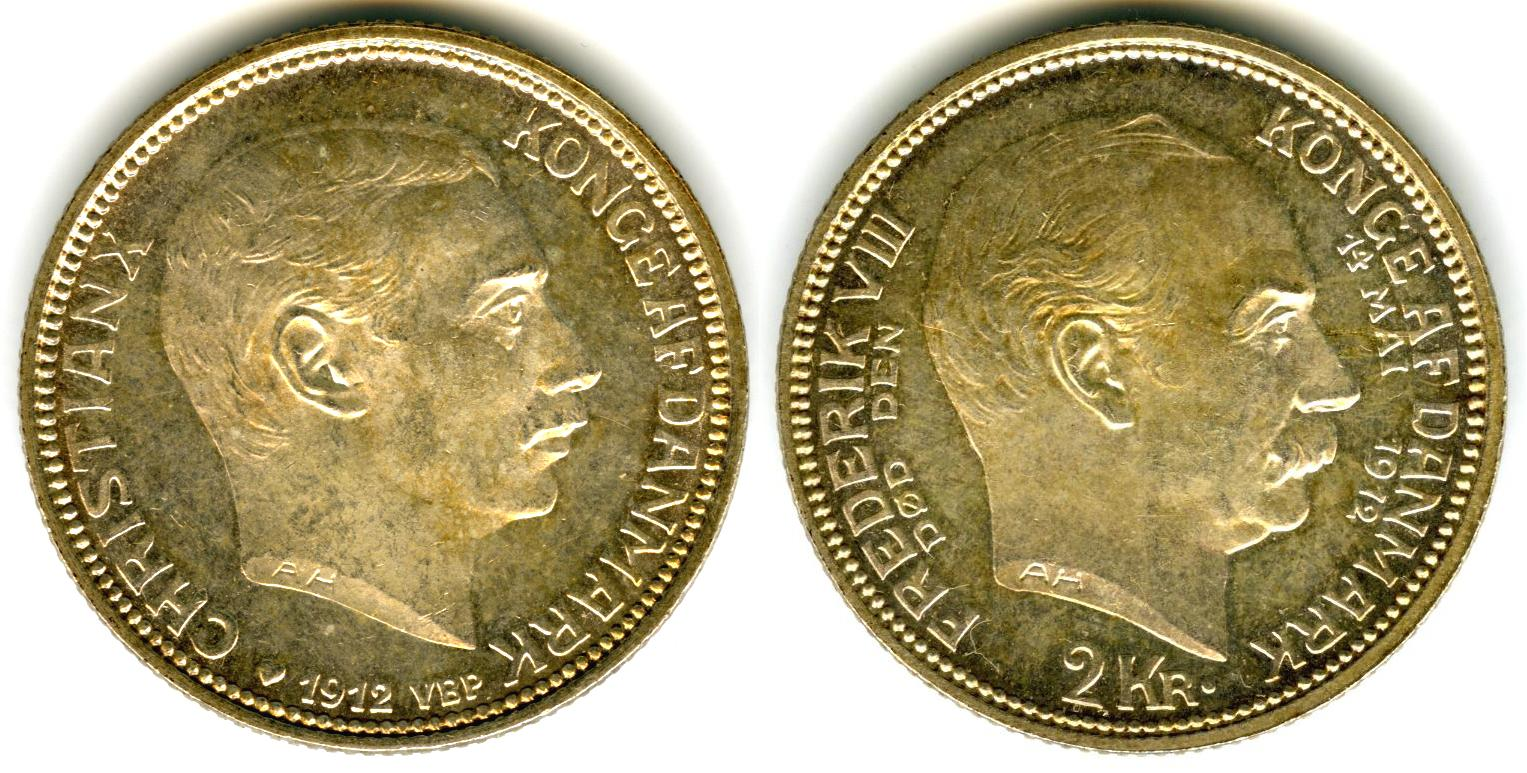
Denmark two kroner coin issued in 1912 commemorating the accession in that year of king Christian X. The king's late father, Frederik VIII is depicted on the reverse.

During the era of the formation of the European nation states, the issuance of special coins explicitly commemorating various events became increasingly common. These coins were frequently devised to establish a public notion of nationhood, and also to honor the ruling monarch and his dynasty. During the economically exhausting Napoleonic wars, a one sixth rigsdaler was issued in Denmark from voluntary contributions from the public, intended to finance the creation of a new fleet. Another notable coin is the Prussian thaler of 1871, commemorating the victory of the Franco-Prussian war, opening the gates for the Prussian king to be crowned as Emperor of the unified German nation. After the (political and monetary) unification of Germany, some German states continued issuing separate coins on special occasions, such as the jubilee of a ruling monarch. The issuance of these royal jubilee coins became common throughout Europe in the late 19th and early 20th century. In some cases, these became collector items already at the time of their minting.

Before World War II, commemorative coins were always made of precious metals. The base metal coins were probably not considered appropriate for, or worthy of, honoring the nation or the ruling dynasty. However, during the 20th century, the use of precious metals for circulating currency became increasingly scarce. World War I and the world economic crisis of the 1930s brought about temporary or permanent abolition of the convertibility of bank notes to silver and gold coins. Gradually, the issuance of precious metal coins became increasingly restricted, and definitively abandoned about 1970. While the commemoratives of these decades continued to be issued predominantly in precious metals, their use as circulating currency became scarce or ceased entirely. Thus, the commemoratives developed into a separate class of coins with no immediately recognisable link to the coins and notes used in everyday transactions. This class of coins were collector's items, or in some cases objects for economic investment.

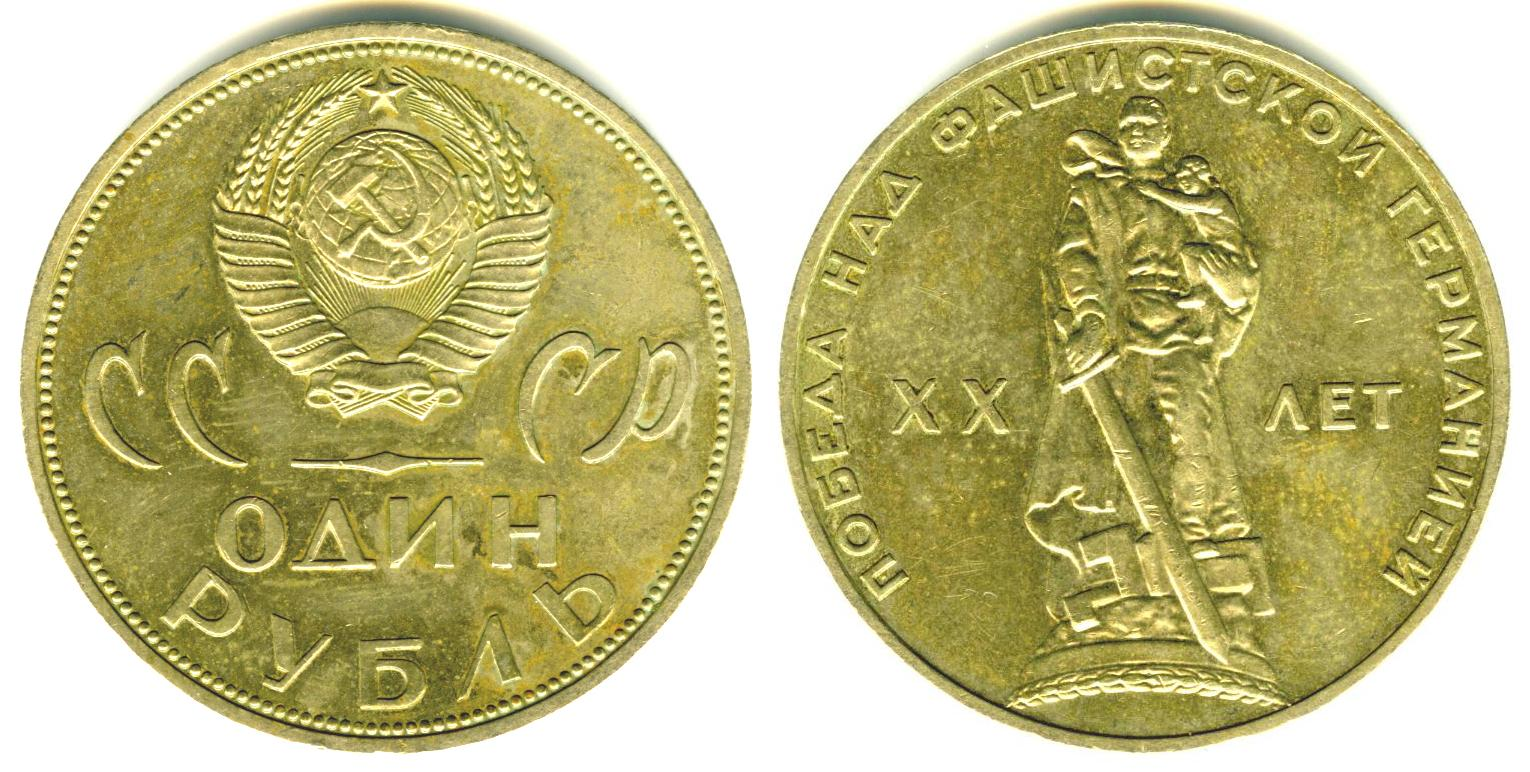
Soviet rouble of 1965, commemorating the 20th anniversary of the victory in World War II. 60 million pieces were minted and circulated as regular currency.

When West Germany replaced the silver 5 mark coin with a copper-nickel one in 1975, the silver 5 mark commemoratives also reverted to copper-nickel (in 1979). Already in 1965, the Soviet Union issued a copper-nickel-zinc rouble commemorating the victory in World War II. This, and the next four commemorative roubles, were issued in several millions of copies, and circulated as regular currency.

In the United Kingdom, before decimalisation of the money system in 1971, the usual commemorative coin was a crown, or five shilling piece. These were issued to mark coronations of monarchs; one was also issued on the occasion of the death of Winston Churchill. Some decimal crowns (worth 25 pence) were issued, but since 1990 the £5 has been the usual non circulating commemorative coin. Other denominations such as the 50 pence and £2 are issued as circulating commemoratives.

Polish 10 złotych of 2008, commemorating 450 Years of the Polish Postal Service. The central part of the obverse shows a stylized image of a postage stamp changing colours depending on the tilt angle.

The circulating and non-circulating commemoratives may be issued jointly, but have quite different purposes. Denmark, for instance, has since 1990 developed a pattern of issuing aluminium bronze 20 kroner commemoratives and accompanying silver 200 krone commemoratives. The aluminium bronze coins are circulating along with the non-commemorative 20 krone coins, while the silver coins are never circulated. The circulating commemoratives brings variation into the circulating coin mass, while the silver coins are collector's items and a source of revenue for the state. Likewise, in East Germany, some commemorative coins were issued with a primary purpose of earning foreign currency, while others actually circulated, albeit in smaller quantity than the bank notes of the corresponding denominations.

== Significance of non-circulating commemoratives ==
Many countries issue large quantities of non-circulating legal tender purely for seigniorage as a profit-making exercise. The events that these coins commemorate are often chosen based on a perceived market, rather than events of significance to the country. Technology developed for non circulating coins has moved to circulation issues - coloured coins were first issued as non-circulating legal tender, but Canada and Australia have issued coloured commemorative coins into circulation.

== See also ==
- Chinese lunar coins
- Commemorative banknote
- €2 commemorative coins
- Coin collecting
- Euro gold and silver commemorative coins
- Proof coinage
- Shooting thaler

Commemorative coins by area:

- Commemorative coins of Australia
- Commemorative coins of Austria
- Commemorative coins of Bermuda
- Commemorative coins of Bulgaria
- Commemorative coins of Canada
- Commemorative coins of Costa Rica
- Commemorative coins of the Czech Republic
- Commemorative coins of Czechoslovakia
- Commemorative coins of France
- List of commemorative coins of the Federal Republic of Germany
- Commemorative coins of Greece
- Commemorative coins of India
- Commemorative coins of Ireland
- Commemorative coins of Lithuania
- Commemorative coins of Pakistan
- Commemorative coins of the Philippines
- Commemorative coins of Poland
- Commemorative coins of the Soviet Union
- Commemorative coins of Switzerland
- List of commemorative coins of Ukraine
- Commemorative coins of the United Kingdom
- United States commemorative coins
