= Commemorative coins of Bermuda =

Bermuda has issued commemorative coins at various times. Most of these coins have been for the purpose of collecting, although Bermuda has also issued commemorative coins for regular circulation. All coins here were minted by the Royal Mint unless otherwise noted.

== Pre-Decimalization ==
Year	Denomination	Composition	Commemorative subject	Description	Mintage
1959	One Crown; 5/-	.925 Ag	350th Colony Founding Anniversary	Released for circulation; Weight: 28.28 grams; Diameter: 38 mm	100,000
1964	One Crown; 5/-	.500 Ag	Possibly as the last pound sterling issue.	Released for circulation; Weight: 22.62 grams; Diameter: 36 mm	470,000

== Decimalized ==
=== 1970's ===
Year	Denomination	Composition	Commemorative subject	Description	Mintage
1972	$100	.900 Au	Silver Wedding		
1975	$100	.900 Au	Royal Visit	Minted by the Franklin Mint; Diameter: 25.5 mm	27,000
1977	$25	.925 Ag	Silver Jubilee of Elizabeth II	Weight: 54.75 grams	

=== 1980's ===
Year	Denomination	Composition	Commemorative subject	Description	Mintage
1981	$250	.917 Au	Charles and Diana Wedding		
1981	$1	.999 Ag	Charles and Diana Wedding	Weight: 38.61 mm; Diameter: 28.28 grams	30,000
1981	$1	CuNi	Charles and Diana Wedding		
1984	25¢	.925 Ag, Cu-Ni	375th Anniversary of Bermuda Settlement	11 different reverse designs, released as a set	
1986	$1	.925 Ag	World Wildlife Fund Coin Collection	Part of a multinational series.	25,000
1987	$25	.999 Pd	Wreck of the Sea Venture	Weight: 31.1035 grams	
1988	$25	.999 Pd	Wreck of the San Antonio	Weight: 31.1035 grams	
1989	$100	.999 Au	Hogge Money	Weight: 31.21 grams	500
1989	$50	.999 Au	Hogge Money	Weight: 15.61 grams	500
1989	$25	.999 Au	Hogge Money	Weight: 7.81 grams	500
1989	$10	.999 Au	Hogge Money	Weight: 3.13 grams	500

=== 1990's ===
Year	Denomination	Composition	Commemorative subject	Description	Mintage
1990	$2	.925 Ag	Bermuda Cicada		
1990	$2	.925 Ag	Bermuda Tree Frog		
1992	$1	.925 Ag	1992 Olympics		
1992	$2	.925 Ag	Bluebird		
1993	$2	.925 Ag	Longtail Sea Bird		
1993	$2	.925 Ag	Humpback Whale		
1994	$2	.925 Ag	1994 Royal Visit	Released in conjunction with five other visited nations.	10,000
1994	$10	.999 Au	Longsnout Seahorse	Weight: 3.13 grams; Diameter: 16.5 mm	2,500
1996	$1	Cu-Ni	Bermuda Triangle	Triangular design	
1996	$3	.925 Ag	Bermuda Triangle	Triangular design; Weight: 20 grams; Diameter: 35 mm	5,000
1996	$9	.999 Ag	Bermuda Triangle	Triangular design; Weight: 155.52 grams; Diameter: 65 mm	
1996	$30	.999 Au	Bermuda Triangle	Triangular design; Weight: 15.55 grams; Diameter: 27 mm	
1996	$60	.999 Au	Bermuda Triangle	Triangular design; Weight: 31.489 grams; Diameter: 35 mm	
1996	$180	.999 Au	Bermuda Triangle	Triangular design	
1997	$2	.925 Ag	Royal Golden Anniversary	Released in conjunction with 23 other nations.; 22 carat gold cameo; Weight: 28.28 grams; Diameter: 38.61 mm	30,000

=== 2000's ===
Year	Denomination	Composition	Commemorative subject	Description	Mintage
2000	$2	.925 Ag	Millennium	24 carat gold plate; Weight: 28.28 grams; Diameter: 38.61 mm	
2000	$1	.925 Ag	Queen Mother Centenary	Released in conjunction with other commonwealth nations.	
2003	$15	.999 Au	100th Anniversary Biological Station For Research	Weight: 15.98 grams; Diameter: 28.4 mm	
2005	$5	.925 Ag	Bermuda Quincentennial	Pentagonal shape; Weight: 14.5 grams; Diameter: 30.89 mm	2,500
2006	$3	.925 Ag	Shipwreck Series: Constellation	Triangular shape; Weight: 33.63 grams; Diameter: 35 mm	15,000
2006	$3	.925 Ag	Shipwreck Series: Hunter Galley	Triangular shape; Weight: 33.63 grams; Diameter: 35 mm	15,000
2006	$3	.925 Ag	Shipwreck Series: Mary Celestia	Triangular shape; Weight: 33.63 grams; Diameter: 35 mm	15,000
2006	$3	.925 Ag	Shipwreck Series: North Carolina	Triangular shape; Weight: 33.63 grams; Diameter: 35 mm	15,000
2006	$3	.925 Ag	Shipwreck Series: Pollock Shields	Triangular shape; Weight: 33.63 grams; Diameter: 35 mm	15,000
2006	$30	.999 Au	Shipwreck Series: Sea Venture	Triangular shape; Weight: 31.489 grams; Diameter: 35 mm	
2006	$3	.925 Ag	Shipwreck Series: Sea Venture	Triangular shape; Weight: 33.63 grams; Diameter: 35 mm	15,000
2007	$3	.925 Ag	Shipwreck Series: Colonel William G. Ball	Triangular shape; Weight: 33.63 grams; Diameter: 35 mm	15,000
2007	$3	.925 Ag	Shipwreck Series: Cristobal Colon	Triangular shape; Weight: 33.63 grams; Diameter: 35 mm	15,000
2007	$3	.925 Ag	Shipwreck Series: Kate	Triangular shape; Weight: 33.63 grams; Diameter: 35 mm	15,000
2007	$3	.925 Ag	Shipwreck Series: San Pedro	Triangular shape; Weight: 33.63 grams; Diameter: 35 mm	15,000
2007	$3	.925 Ag	Shipwreck Series: San Lucia	Triangular shape; Weight: 33.63 grams; Diameter: 35 mm	15,000
2007	$3	.925 Ag	Shipwreck Series: Manilla Wreck	Triangular shape; Weight: 33.63 grams; Diameter: 35 mm	15,000
2009	$4	.925 Ag	400th Anniversary	Four-sided, square design	2,000

== See also ==
- Bermuda Monetary Authority
