= Commemorative coins of the Philippines =

This is a list of commemorative coins issued by the Philippines. More info here.

== Pre-'60s ==
Image	Value	Year	Description	Issued	Diameter	Weight	Composition
	50 centavos	1936	Foundation of the Commonwealth of the Philippines, with portraits of President Manuel Quezon and Governor General Frank Murphy	20,000	27.5 mm	10.0 g	75% silver
	1 peso	1936	Foundation of the Commonwealth of the Philippines, with portraits of President Manuel Quezon and U.S. President Franklin D. Roosevelt	10,000	35 mm	20.0 g	90% silver
	1 peso	1936	Foundation of the Commonwealth of the Philippines, with portraits of President Manuel Quezon and Governor General Frank Murphy	10,000	35 mm	20.0 g	90% silver
	50 centavos	1947	Liberation of the Philippines by Gen. Douglas MacArthur	200,000	27.5 mm	10.0 g	75% silver
	1 peso	1947	Liberation of the Philippines by Gen. Douglas MacArthur	100,000	35 mm	20.0 g	90% silver

== 1960s ==
Image	Value	Year	Description	Issued	Diameter	Weight	Composition
	50 centavos	1961	100th Anniversary of Birth of Jose Rizal	100,000	30.6 mm	12.5 g	90% silver
	1 peso	1961	100th Anniversary of Birth of Jose Rizal	100,000	38 mm	26.4 g	90% silver
	1 peso	1963	100th Anniversary of Birth of Andres Bonifacio	100,000	38 mm	26.4 g	90% silver
	1 peso	1964	100th Anniversary of Birth of Apolinario Mabini	100,000	38 mm	26.4 g	90% silver
	1 peso	1967	25th Anniversary of the Fall of Bataan (Araw ng Kagitingan)	100,000	38 mm	26.4 g	90% silver
	1 peso	1969	100th Anniversary of Birth of Emilio Aguinaldo	100,000	38 mm	26.4 g	90% silver

== 1970s ==
1970's commemorative coins
Image	Value	Diameter	Weight	Composition	Edge	Obverse	Reverse	Subject	First Minted Year
	₱1	38.3 mm	23.6 g	nickel	Reeded	Profile of Ferdinand Marcos, "PANGULO NG PILIPINAS", denomination	Profile of Pope Paul VI, "PAGDALAW NG PAPA SA PILIPINAS", "PAPA PAULO VI", year of minting	Papal Visit of Pope Paul VI	November 27, 1970
	₱1	39 mm	26.45 g	90% silver	Reeded	Profile of Ferdinand Marcos, "PANGULO NG PILIPINAS", denomination	Profile of Pope Paul VI, "PAGDALAW NG PAPA SA PILIPINAS", "PAPA PAULO VI", year of minting	Papal Visit of Pope Paul VI	November 27, 1970
	₱1	38.3 mm	19.3 g	90% gold	Reeded	Profile of Ferdinand Marcos, "PANGULO NG PILIPINAS", denomination	Profile of Pope Paul VI, "PAGDALAW NG PAPA SA PILIPINAS", "PAPA PAULO VI", year of minting	Papal Visit of Pope Paul VI	November 27, 1970
	₱25	38.1 mm	26.4 g	90% silver	Reeded	Headquarters of the Bangko Sentral ng Pilipinas, "BANGKO SENTRAL NG PILIPINAS", "IKA-25 ANIBERSARYO" "1949 - 1974"	"Republika ng Pilipinas", Coat of arms of the Philippines, denomination	25th Anniversary of the establishment of the Bangko Sentral ng Pilipinas	January 3, 1974
	₱25	38 mm	25 g	50% silver	Reeded	"REPUBLIKA NG PILIPINAS", portrait of Emilio Aguinaldo, year of minting	"ANG BAGONG LIPUNAN", Coat of arms of the Philippines, denomination	Emilio Aguinaldo	1975
	₱25	37.2 mm	25 g	50% silver	Reeded	Woman holding a bundle of rice, "MASAGANANG ANI MAUNLAD NA BUHAY", year of minting	"REPUBLIKA NG PILIPINAS", Coat of arms of the Philippines, denomination	Food and Agriculture Organization	1976
	₱25	40 mm	25 g	50% silver	Reeded	Banaue Rice Terraces, "REPUBLIKA NG PILIPINAS", year of minting	"ANG BAGONG LIPUNAN", Coat of arms of the Philippines, denomination	Food and Agriculture Organization: Banaue Rice Terraces	1977
	₱25	38 mm	25 g	50% silver	Reeded	Quezon Memorial Shrine, "MANUEL L. QUEZON", "1878", "1978"	"ANG BAGONG LIPUNAN", Coat of arms of the Philippines, denomination	100th Anniversary of the birth of Manuel L. Quezon	August 19, 1978
	₱50	40 mm	27.4 g	92.5% silver	Reeded	Profile of Ferdinand Marcos, "ANG BAGONG LIPUNAN"", "SETYEMBRE 21, 1972", "PANGULONG FERDINAND E. MARCOS", year	Coat of arms of the Philippines, value	"Ang Bagong Lipunan" (The New Society)	1975
	₱50	40 mm	27.4 g	92.5% silver	Reeded	Map of the Philippines, value	Four seals of four organizations: the Monetary Fund, the World Bank, International Finance Corporation and the International Development Association, "BOARD OF GOVERNORS", "ANNUAL MEETINGS", "1976", "MANILA"	Meetings of the International Monetary Fund in Manila	1976
	₱50	40 mm	27.4 g	92.5% silver	Reeded	Coat of arms of the Philippines, value	Coins of fifty and five centavos of the Philippines under American administration, the main facilities of the Security Printing Plant and Minting Complex, "INAUGURATION OF THE SECURITY PLANT AND MINTING COMPLEX", year	Inauguration of the Security Plant and Minting Complex	1977
	₱50	40 mm	27.4 g	92.5% silver	Reeded	Profile of Manuel L. Quezon, Coat of arms of the Commonwealth of the Philippines, "MANUEL L. QUEZON", "1878-1978"	"ANG BAGONG LIPUNAN", Coat of arms of the Philippines, denomination	100th Anniversary of the birth of Manuel L. Quezon	August 19, 1978
	₱1,000	26.3 mm	9.95 g	90% gold	Reeded	Profile of Ferdinand Marcos, "ANG BAGONG LIPUNAN"", "SETYEMBRE 21, 1972", "PANGULONG FERDINAND E. MARCOS", year	Coat of arms of the Philippines, value	3rd Anniversary of The New Society	1975
	₱1,500	33 mm	20.55 g	90% gold	Reeded	Map of the Philippines, value	Four seals of four organizations: the Monetary Fund, the World Bank, International Finance Corporation and the International Development Association, "BOARD OF GOVERNORS", "ANNUAL MEETINGS", "1976", "MANILA"	Meetings of the International Monetary Fund in Manila	1976
	₱1,500	33 mm	20.55 g	90% gold	Reeded	Portrait of Ferdinand Marcos, "ANG BAGONG LIPUNAN", "PANGULONG FERDINAND E. MARCOS", "1972 - 1977"	Seal of the Bangko Sentral ng Pilipinas, "REPUBLIKA NG PILIPINAS", value	5th Anniversary of The New Society	1977
	₱1,500	33 mm	20.55 g	90% gold	Reeded	Bouquet of the flowers of the Philippines, "REPUBLIKA NG PILIPINAS", denomination	"SECURITY PRINTING PLANT-GOLD REFINERY AND MINT" One and twenty pesos banknotes, coins of twenty-five and five sentimos and one piso, three gold ingots, main building of the Security Printing Plant and Minting Complex	Security Printing and Minting	1978
	₱5,000	50 mm	68.74 g	90% gold	Reeded	Portraits of Ferdinand Marcos and Imelda Marcos, "THE NEW SOCIETY", "V ANNIVERSARY", "1972", "1977"	Seal of the president of the Philippines, "REPUBLIKA NG PILIPINAS", value	5th Anniversary of The New Society	1977

== 1980s ==
1980's commemorative coins
Image	Value	Diameter	Weight	Composition	Edge	Obverse	Reverse	First Minted Year
	₱1	28.5 mm	9.5 gm	copper-nickel	Reeded	Busts of an Agta woman, an Ifugao and a Bagobo representing Luzon, Visayas and Mindanao over the fields of Banaue Rice Terraces, an Abaca and a vinta in celebration of the Philippine Culture Decade	Coat of arms of the Philippines, "Republika ng Pilipinas", year of minting, denomination	1989
	₱10	36 mm	22 g	nickel	Reeded	Diorama of 1986 EDSA Revolution, "People Power Revolution", "Philippines February 22–25, 1986"	Coat of arms of the Philippines, "Republika ng Pilipinas", year of minting, value	February 25, 1988
	₱25	38 mm	25 g	50% silver	Reeded	Portrait of General Douglas MacArthur, "Ikasandaang Taong Kaarawan" marking MacArthur's 100th birthday, "1880-1980"	"Republika ng Pilipinas", "Leyte Landing October 20, 1944", value	1980
	₱25	38 mm	25 g	50% silver	Reeded	Crops and fishes, "World Food Day", year of minting	Coat of arms of the Philippines, value	1981
	₱25	38 mm	25 g	50% silver	Reeded	Conjoined portraits of US President Ronald Reagan and Ferdinand Marcos, year of minting	Coat of arms of the Philippines, "Republika ng Pilipinas", value	1982
	₱25	35 mm	18.41 g	92.5% silver	Reeded	Portrait of US President Ronald Reagan, "Official Working Visit/Washington, D.C.", "September 1986" marking Corazon Aquino's state visit to the United States	Portrait of President Corazon Aquino, "Republika ng Pilipinas", year of minting, value	1986
	₱50	38 mm	27.4 g	92.5% silver	Reeded	Conjoined portraits of an American soldier and a Filipino officer, "Bataan-Corregidor", years "1942" and "1982" marking 40th anniversary of Battle of Corregidor	Coat of arms of the Philippines, "Republika ng Pilipinas", value	1982
	₱50	40 mm	27.4 g	92.5% silver	Reeded	Portrait of Pope John Paul II, "Pagdalaw ng Papa sa Pilipinas" in celebration of the beatification of San Lorenzo Ruiz, year of minting	"Republika ng Pilipinas", iconography of Filipino martyr Saint Lorenzo Ruiz, value	1981
	₱100	38 mm	25 g	50% silver	Reeded	UP Oblation, Quezon Hall (UP Administration Building) and Gonzales Hall (UP Main Building), "1908-1983" marking the Diamond Jubilee of the University of the Philippines	Coat of arms of the Philippines, "Republika ng Pilipinas", value	1983
	₱200	38 mm	25 g	92.5% silver	Reeded	Picture of a Tamaraw, "Anoa mindorensis" inscription, "World Wildlife Fund", year of minting	Coat of arms of the Philippines, "Republika ng Pilipinas", value	1987
	₱500	40 mm	28 g	92.5% silver	Reeded	Diorama of 1986 EDSA Revolution, "People Power Revolution", "Philippines February 22–25, 1986"	Coat of arms of the Philippines, "Republika ng Pilipinas", year of minting, value	February 25, 1988
	₱1500	26 mm	9.95 g	90% gold	Reeded	Portrait of Pope John Paul II, "Papa Juan Pablo II", "Pagdalaw ng Papa sa Pilipinas" celebrating of the beatification of San Lorenzo Ruiz, year of minting	"Republika ng Pilipinas", iconography of Filipino martyr Saint Lorenzo Ruiz, "Lorenzo Ruiz Martir na Pilipino", denomination	February 17, 1981
	₱1500	26 mm	9.78 g	90% gold	Reeded	Conjoined portraits of an American soldier and a Filipino officer, "Bataan-Corregidor", years "1942" and "1982" marking 40th anniversary of Battle of Corregidor	Coat of arms of the Philippines, "Republika ng Pilipinas", value	1982
	₱2500	33 mm	14.57 g	50% gold	Reeded	Portrait of General Douglas MacArthur, "Ikasandaang Taong Kaarawan" marking MacArthur's 100th birthday, "1880-1980"	"Republika ng Pilipinas", "Leyte Landing October 20, 1944", value	1980
	₱2500	35 mm	15 g	50% gold	Reeded	Portrait of US President Ronald Reagan, "Official Working Visit/Washington, D.C.", "September 1986" marking Corazon Aquino's state visit to the United States	Portrait of Presidtent Corazon Aquino, "Republika ng Pilipinas", year of minting, value	1986

== 1990s ==
1990's commemorative coins
Image	Value	Diameter	Weight	Composition	Edge	Obverse	Reverse	First Minted Year
	₱1	29 mm	9.5 g	cupronickel	Reeded	"Ika-400 Taon ng Antipolo, Rizal", icon of Our Lady of Peace and Good Voyage on the Hinulugang Taktak waterfalls, image of Artocarpus incisa, "1591-1991"	"Republika ng Pilipinas", Coat of arms of the Philippines, denomination	1990
	₱1	21.53 mm	4.0 g	nickel-clad steel	Plain	"Araw ng Kagitingan/Ika-50 Anibersaryo" with year inscriptions "1942" and "1992" marking the 50th anniversary of Bataan Day, portrait of a Filipino soldier with "Dambana ng Kagitingan" inscription	"Republika ng Pilipinas", Coat of arms of the Philippines, denomination	April 9, 1992
	₱2	31 mm (across corners); 29.8 mm (across flats)	12 g	cupronickel	Plain (decagonal shape)	"Ika-100 Taong Kaarawan", bust of Elpidio Quirino, "1890-1990" marking Quirino's centennial birthday	Seal of the president of the Philippines from "1948-1953", denomination	1990
	₱2	31 mm (across corners); 29.8 mm (across flats)	12 g	cupronickel	Plain (decagonal shape)	"Ika-100 Taong Kaarawan", bust of Jose P. Laurel, "1891-1991" marking Laurel's centennial birthday	"Republika ng Pilipinas", Coat of arms of the Philippines in 1943, denomination	1990
	₱2	23.5 mm	5.0 g	nickel-plated steel	Reeded	"Ika-100 taong kaarawan", bust of Manuel A. Roxas, "1892-1992" marking Roxas' centennial birth anniversary	Seal of the president of the Philippines from "1946-1948", denomination	1992
	₱5	25.5 mm	9.453 g	nickel brass	Reeded	"Leyte Gulf Landing's 50th Anniversary", "October 20, 1944", "Leyte, Philippines"	"Republika ng Pilipinas", Coat of arms of the Philippines, denomination	1994
	₱100	30 mm	16.73 g	80% silver	Reeded	"Leyte Gulf Landing's 50th Anniversary", "October 20, 1944", "Leyte, Philippines"	"Republika ng Pilipinas", Coat of arms of the Philippines, denomination	1994
	₱100	28.5 mm	10.0 g	92.5% silver	Reeded	"Papal Visit '95" in celebration of World Youth Day 1995, "Pope John Paul II", portrait of Pope John Paul II, "Manila, Philippines/12-16 January 1995"	"Republika ng Pilipinas", Coat of arms of the Philippines, denomination	1995
	₱150	30 mm	16.73 g	92.5% silver	Reeded	Logo of SEA Games, "Manila XVI Southeast Asian Games" inscription, year of minting	"Republika ng Pilipinas", Coat of arms of the Philippines, denomination	1991
	₱200	38 mm	25.0 g	92.5% silver	Reeded	"Save the Children Fund", picture of children playing "hurdling thorns", year of minting	"Republika ng Pilipinas", Coat of arms of the Philippines, denomination	1990
	₱200	30 mm	15.58 g	99.9% Silver	Reeded	"Papal Visit '95" in celebration of World Youth Day 1995, "Pope John Paul II", portrait of Pope John Paul II, "Manila, Philippines/12-16 January 1995"	"Republika ng Pilipinas", Coat of arms of the Philippines, denomination	1995
	₱500	36 mm	23.1 g	92.5% silver	Reeded	"Leyte Gulf Landing's 50th Anniversary", "October 20, 1944", "Leyte, Philippines"	"Republika ng Pilipinas", Coat of arms of the Philippines, denomination	1994
	₱500	38.6 mm	28.28 g	92.5% silver	Reeded	"Jose Rizal Martyrdom Centennial", Rizal Monument, "Ang Kagitingan, Walang Kamatayan", year inscriptions "1896" & "1996" marking Rizal's death centenary	"Republika ng Pilipinas", Flag of the Philippines, denomination	1996
	₱1	24 mm	6.1 g	copper-nickel	Reeded	"Philippine-American Friendship Day - 50th Anniversary 1946-1996", "1 Piso", raising of the flags of the Philippines and the United States	Coat of arms of the Philippines	1996
	₱500	38.6 mm	28.28 g	92.5% silver	Reeded	"Andres Bonifacio Centennial", portrait of Andres Bonifacio on the Katipunan flag, year inscriptions "1897" & "1997" marking Bonifacio's death centenary	"Republika ng Pilipinas", Flag of the Philippines, denomination	1997
	₱500	38.6 mm	28.28 g	92.5% silver	Reeded	"Carlos P. Romulo centennial", "1898-1998" marking Romulo's centennial birthday	Coat of arms of the Philippines, denomination	February 14, 1998
	₱500	38.6 mm	28.28 g	92.5% silver	Reeded	"Ikasandaang Taong Pagpapahayag ng Kasarinlan ng Pilipinas", profile of Emilio Aguinaldo, "Unang Pangulo ng Republika ng Pilipinas", year inscriptions "1898" and "1998" marking the centennial celebration of Philippine Declaration of Independence	Flag of the Philippines, denomination	June 12, 1998
	₱500	38.6 mm	28.28 g	92.5% silver	Reeded	"Limampung Taon ng Pagbabangko Sentral sa Pilipinas", former logos of the BSP in 1949 and 1999	"Republika ng Pilipinas", former and current building of the BSP, denomination	1999
	₱1000	40 mm	31.1 g	99.9% silver	Reeded	"Leyte Gulf Landing's 50th Anniversary", "October 20, 1944", "Leyte, Philippines"	"Republika ng Pilipinas", Coat of arms of the Philippines, denomination	1994
	₱2000	27 mm	10 g	50% gold	Reeded	"Republika ng Pilipinas", bust of Fidel V. Ramos, "President Fidel V. Ramos"	"Asia Pacific Economic Cooperation", "1996", APEC logo, denomination	1996
	₱2500	22 mm	7.31 g	91.7% gold	Reeded	"Papal Visit '95" in celebration of World Youth Day 1995, "Pope John Paul II", portrait of Pope John Paul II, "Manila, Philippines/12-16 January 1995"	"Republika ng Pilipinas", Coat of arms of the Philippines, denomination	1995
	₱5000	27 mm	16.81 g	91.7% gold	Reeded	"Papal Visit '95" in celebration of World Youth Day 1995, "Pope John Paul II", portrait of Pope John Paul II, "Manila, Philippines/12-16 January 1995"	"Republika ng Pilipinas", Coat of arms of the Philippines, denomination	1995
	₱5000	30 mm	16 g	75% gold	Reeded	"Limampung Taon ng Pagbabangko Sentral sa Pilipinas", former logos of the BSP in 1949 and 1999	"Republika ng Pilipinas", former and current building of the BSP, denomination	1999
	₱10,000	32.7 mm	33.93 g	91.7% gold	Reeded	"Democracy Restored/VI Anniversary", Philippine map and constitution on a dove flying towards a ray of light with "1986/1982" inscription	"Republic of the Philippines", bust of President Corazon C. Aquino, denomination	1992

== 2010s - 2020s ==
On December 9, 2011, the Bangko Sentral ng Pilipinas (BSP) issued a commemorative one-peso coin in celebration of the 150th Birth Anniversary of José Rizal. The coins are in the same dimensions as the circulating one peso coins with Rizal's face from the front instead of in profile. The new coin also has the new logo of the central bank and is legal tender with the current series.

On December 18, 2013, the Bangko Sentral ng Pilipinas issued a commemorative ten-peso coin in celebration of the 150th Birth Anniversary of Andres Bonifacio. The coins are in the same dimensions, but the design changed. These also featured the new logo of the central bank and is also legal tender.

On December 22, 2014, the BSP issued three commemorative coins, a five-peso coin to commemorate the 70th anniversary of the Leyte Gulf Landings, a five-peso coin honoring Overseas Filipinos with the theme "Bagong Bayani" and a ten-peso coin celebrating the 150th anniversary of the birth of Apolinario Mabini.

On January 14, 2015, the BSP issued two limited edition commemorative coins for the papal visit of Pope Francis, a 50-peso coin made of nickel-brass steel and a 500-peso coin made of Nordic gold with gold plating. A special logo with the theme "Mercy and Compassion" was minted on the reverse side of both coins, following the Pope's papal bull of indiction proclaimed later that year to mark the Extraordinary Jubilee of Mercy. The coins are minted under a licensing agreement with the Vatican. Both coins are legal tender. Production and issuance of two additional silver and gold coins in 1000-peso and 10,000-peso denominations were called off due to limitations in the procurement process.

On December 21, 2015, the BSP issued a commemorative 10-peso coin in honor of General Miguel Malvar, in time for the 150th year birth anniversary.

On January 27, 2017, the BSP issued a commemorative one-peso coin in honor of the Philippines' Chairmanship of the Association of Southeast Asian Nations (ASEAN).

In August and November 2017, the BSP issued commemorative one-peso coins and 10-peso coin both honoring the centennial anniversary of the birth of educator and historian Horacio de la Costa and the 150th anniversary of the birth of three officers of the Philippine Revolutionary Army, Generals Artemio Ricarte, Isidoro Torres and Antonio Luna.

In 2018 and 2019, the Bangko Sentral ng Pilipinas issued commemorative coins in commemoration of the anniversary of the Bangko Sentral ng Pilipinas, two 500-peso silver coins, with one commemorating the 25th anniversary of the formation of the current Bangko Sentral ng Pilipinas and one commemorating 70 Years of Central Banking in the Philippines (in reference to the formal establishment of the original Central Bank of the Philippines/Bangko Sentral ng Pilipinas in 1949). A 10,000 peso gold coin was also issued to commemorate 70 years of Central Banking in the Philippines.

On March 11, 2022, the BSP issued a commemorative 125-peso coin to honor the 125th martyrdom anniversary of Dr. Jose Rizal.

Current legal tender commemorative coins
Image	Value	Diameter	Weight	Composition	Edge	Obverse	Reverse	First Minted Year
	₱1	24.0 mm	5.35 g	Nickel-plated steel	Reeded	"Republika ng Pilipinas", Profile of José Rizal, "150 Years", "1861-2011"	Logo of the Bangko Sentral ng Pilipinas with a facade of the sun, value, year of minting	December 9, 2011
	₱1	24.0 mm	5.35 g	Nickel-plated steel	Reeded	"Republika ng Pilipinas", Profile of Artemio Ricarte, "Heneral Artemio Ricarte", "150 Years"	Logo of the Bangko Sentral ng Pilipinas, value, year of minting	August 24, 2017
	₱1	24.0 mm	5.35 g	Nickel-plated steel	Reeded	"Republika ng Pilipinas", Profile of Isidro Torres, "Heneral Isidro Torres", "150 Years"	Logo of the Bangko Sentral ng Pilipinas, value, year of minting	August 24, 2017
	₱1	24.0 mm	5.35 g	Nickel-plated steel	Reeded	"Republika ng Pilipinas", Profile of Horacio De la Costa, "Rev. Horacio De la Costa", "100 Years"	Logo of the Bangko Sentral ng Pilipinas, value, year of minting	August 24, 2017
	₱1	24.0 mm	5.35 g	Nickel-plated steel	Reeded	"Partnering for Change, Engaging the World"; "ASEAN 50"; "Philippines 2017"; the sun from the flag of the Philippines with dove and emblem of the Association of Southeast Asian Nations (ASEAN); names of the members of the Association of Southeast Asian Nations (ASEAN)	Monument of José Rizal at Rizal Park; "Republika ng Pilipinas"; "1 Piso"; logo of the Bangko Sentral ng Pilipinas; names of the members of the Association of Southeast Asian Nations (ASEAN)	January 20, 2017
	₱5	27.0 mm	7.7 g	Nickel-brass	Plain	"Republika ng Pilipinas", profile of Filipinos of various professions, "Bagong Bayani"	Date of issue, passenger jet, logo of the Bangko Sentral ng Pilipinas, a Filipino family, denomination	March 3, 2014
	₱5	27.0 mm	7.7 g	Nickel-brass	Plain	"Leyte Gulf Landing", scene of the landing, "70th Anniversary", "1944-2014"	"I have returned. By the grace of Almighty God our forces stand again on Philippine soil - soil consecrated from the blood of our two peoples.", five stars denoting the rank of field marshal, date and signature of Douglas MacArthur, logo of the Bangko Sentral ng Pilipinas, denomination	September 30, 2014
	₱10	26.5 mm	8.7 g	Bi-metallic (Copper nickel outer ring with an aluminum bronze center plug)	Segmented	"Republika ng Pilipinas", Profile of Andres Bonifacio	Monument of Andres Bonifacio, "Dangal at Kabayanihan", signature of Andres Bonifacio, logo of the Bangko Sentral ng Pilipinas, "150 Years", "1863-2013"	November 22, 2013
	₱10	26.5 mm	8.7 g	Bi-metallic (Copper nickel outer ring with an aluminum bronze center plug)	Segmented	"Republika ng Pilipinas", Profile of Apolinario Mabini, quill pen	"Talino at Paninindigan" Monument to Apolinario Mabini, signature of Apolinario Mabini, logo of the Bangko Sentral ng Pilipinas, "150 Taon", "1864-2014"	August 20, 2014
	₱10	26.5 mm	8.7 g	Bi-metallic (Copper nickel outer ring with an aluminum bronze center plug)	Segmented	"Republika ng Pilipinas", portrait and signature of Miguel Malvar, denomination	Logo of the Bangko Sentral ng Pilipinas, figure of Miguel Malvar, "150 Taon", "1865-2015"	September 18, 2015
	₱10	26.5 mm	8.7 g	Bi-metallic (Copper nickel outer ring with an aluminum bronze center plug)	Segmented	"Republika ng Pilipinas", portrait and signature of Antonio Luna, denomination	Logo of the Bangko Sentral ng Pilipinas, figure of Antonio Luna, "DANGAL, TAPANG, DIGNIDAD" text, "150 Taon", "1866-2016"	November 24, 2017
	₱50	27 mm	7.7 g	Nickel-brass	Segmented	"Republika ng Pilipinas", portrait and signature of Pope Francis, denomination, year of minting, BSP mint mark	Logo of the Bangko Sentral ng Pilipinas, "Papal Visit/Philippines", date of visit "January 15–19, 2015", logo of the Papal Visit 2015, mini letters "Mercy and Compassion"	January 14, 2015
	₱500	34 mm	15 g	Nordic gold	Reeded	"Republika ng Pilipinas", portrait and signature of Pope Francis, denomination, year of minting, BSP mint mark	Logo of the Bangko Sentral ng Pilipinas, "Papal Visit/Philippines", date of visit "January 15–19, 2015", logo of the Papal Visit 2015, mini letters "Mercy and Compassion"	January 14, 2015
	₱80	34 mm	15 g	Nordic gold		Symbols of law and justice; "Court of Appeals at 80: Reaching Judicial Excellence" 80th Anniversary 1936-2016	"Republika ng Pilipinas"; seal of the Court of Appeals; denomination; Logo of the Bangko Sentral ng Pilipinas	
	₱100	34 mm	15 g	Nordic gold		Main building and logo of Philtrust Bank, text "100 Years 1916-2016"	"Republika ng Pilipinas", logo of the Bangko Sentral ng Pilipinas, denomination	
	₱100	34 mm	15 g	Gold-plated copper		Text "Lakas, Talino at Buhay"; "Lungsod ng Muntilupa 1917-2017"; "100 Taon"; seal of the city of Muntinlupa; the city hall of Muntinlupa; "Papuri sa Diyos"	"Republika ng Pilipinas", logo of the Bangko Sentral ng Pilipinas; denomination "Sandaang Piso"	
	₱100	34 mm	15 g	Gold-plated Nordic gold		Text "Republika ng Pilipinas"; portrait of President Emilio Aguinaldo; logo of the Bangko Sentral ng Pilipinas; denomination	Text "Kalayaan at Kasarinlan"; "150 Taon"; microlettering "100 Piso"	
	₱125	34 mm	15 g	Nordic gold	Reeded	"Martyrdom of Jose Rizal", portrait and signature Jose Rizal, "125 years", BSP mint mark	Logo of the Bangko Sentral ng Pilipinas, "Republika ng Pilipinas", denomination, mini letters, Rizal Monument	March 11, 2022
	₱500	38.6 mm	28.28 g	.999 fine silver		Philippine eagle (Pithecophaga jefferyi), logo of the Bangko Sentral ng Pilipinas, date of issue, denomination, mint mark, "Republika ng Pilipinas"	Logo of the Bangko Sentral ng Pilipinas, text "25 years 1993-2018", microlettering "EXCELLENCE, PATRIOTISM, ACCOUNTABILITY, INTEGRITY, and SOLIDARITY"	
	₱500	38.6 mm	28.28 g	.999 fine silver		Silhouette of the Philippine eagle from the logo of the Bangko Sentral ng Pilipinas, logo of the Bangko Sentral ng Pilipinas, main complex of the Bangko Sentral ng Pilipinas, "Republika ng Pilipinas", mint mark, denomination	Text "70 Years of Central Banking 1949-2019", four seals of the Central Bank of the Philippines/Bangko Sentral ng Pilipinas, former headquarters of the Bangko Sentral ng Pilipinas (Aduana Building), Intramuros	
	₱10,000	38.6 mm	42 g	.996 gold		Silhouette of the Philippine eagle from the logo of the Bangko Sentral ng Pilipinas, logo of the Bangko Sentral ng Pilipinas, main complex of the Bangko Sentral ng Pilipinas, "Republika ng Pilipinas", mint mark, denomination	Text "70 Years of Central Banking 1949-2019", four seals of the Central Bank of the Philippines/Bangko Sentral ng Pilipinas, former headquarters of the Bangko Sentral ng Pilipinas (Aduana Building), Intramuros	
