= Commemorative coins of Greece =

== Commemorative drachma coins ==
Commemorative Greek drachma coins have been issued by the Bank of Greece throughout the 20th century. Early (1940–1967) coins were minted in Birmingham, Paris, Vienna, and Prague, but since 1978 all of Greece's commemorative coins have been minted in Athens.

=== 1940 - restored monarchy ===
Commemorative coins of 1940 were minted to celebrate the five years of the restored Greek monarchy under King George II.

- 100 drachmas, silver and copper, George II of Greece, 25 November 1935
- 20 drachmas, gold and copper, George II of Greece, 25 November 1935
- 100 drachmas, gold and copper, George II of Greece, 25 November 1935

=== 1963 - Centennial of the monarchy ===
- 30 drachmas, silver. The obverse depicts five kings of the House of Glücksburg, 1863–1963. Clockwise from the top: Paul, George II, Alexander, Constantine I and George I.

=== 1964 - Royal Wedding ===
- 30 drachmas, silver (weight reduced from the 1963 coin). Commemorates the wedding of King Constantine II and Anne-Marie of Denmark. Obverse shows profiles of the couple, reverse the royal crowned double-headed eagle.

=== 1970 - military junta ===
In 1970 the Greek junta regime issued a number of commemorative coins with the coup d'état of 1967 as a topic.

- 50 drachmas, silver and copper, phoenix, soldier, 21 April 1967
- 100 drachmas, silver and copper, phoenix, soldier, 21 April 1967
- 20 drachmas, gold and copper, phoenix, soldier, 21 April 1967
- 100 drachmas, gold and copper, phoenix, soldier, 21 April 1967

=== 1978 - 50 years Bank of Greece ===
The Bank of Greece celebrated its 50th birthday with a commemorative coin in 1978.

- 100 drachmas, silver, Athena, Bank of Greece 50 years, 1928–1978

=== 1979 - Greece enters the EEC ===
The coins issued in 1979 celebrating Greece's entry into the European Economic Community were the first ones to feature the modern version of the Greek plural δραχμές instead of δραχμαί.

- 500 drachmas, silver, the stealing of Europa
- 10,000 drachmas, gold, Amphiktyon

=== 1981-82 - 14th Paneuropean games ===
Coins issued in 1981 and 1982 celebrated the 13th Paneuropean games, which were held in Athens in 1982. Although minted two years after the 1979 coin, all of these coins featured the old spelling δραχμαί again.

==== 1981 - 1st set ====
- 100 drachmas, silver, ancient olympic long jump
- 250 drachmas, silver, ancient olympic javelin throw
- 500 drachmas, silver, ancient olympic stadion race
- 2,500 drachmas, gold, Hermes
- 5,000 drachmas, gold, Zeus

==== 1982 - 2nd set ====
- 100 drachmas, silver, 1896 olympic high jump
- 250 drachmas, silver, 1896 olympic discus throw
- 500 drachmas, silver, 1896 olympic race
- 2500 drachmas, gold, Spiridon Louis
- 5000 drachmas, gold, Pierre De Coubertin

==== 1982 - 3rd set ====
- 100 drachmas, silver, modern pole vault
- 250 drachmas, silver, modern shot put
- 500 drachmas, silver, modern race
- 2500 drachmas, gold, Eirene
- 5,000 drachmas, gold, doves flying

=== 1984 - Los Angeles Olympic Games ===
Two commemorative coins were minted in 1984 to celebrate the XXIII Olympic Games in Los Angeles.

- 500 drachmas, silver, ancient olympic torchbearer
- 5,000 drachmas, gold, Apollo

=== 1985 - U.N. Decade on the woman ===
In 1985 two coins were minted celebrating the United Nations Decade for women (1976–1985).

- 1,000 drachmas, silver, group of women
- 10,000 drachmas, gold, Nike

=== 1988 - Chess olympiad in Thessaloniki ===
The 1988 coins were minted to honour the 28th Chess Olympiad in Thessaloniki.

- 100 drachmas, copper and nickel, chess olympiad emblem and the White Tower
- 500 drachmas, silver, chess olympiad emblem and ancient chess players

=== 1990 - 50th anniversary 28 October 1940 ===
The two coins minted in 1990 celebrate the 50th anniversary of the Italian invasion in Greece in World War II. The 28th of October is celebrated every year as a national holiday in Greece.

- 1,000 drachmas, silver, soldiers with horse, 28 October 1940
- 20,000 drachmas, gold, soldiers with horse, 28 October 1940

=== 1991 - Mediterranean games in Athens ===
Two coins were minted in 1991 to celebrate the 11th Mediterranean Games, which were held in Athens that year.

- 500 drachmas, silver, dolphin
- 10,000 drachmas, gold, dolphin

=== 1993 - 2500 years of democracy ===
An unusual anniversary, 2500 years of democracy, counting from Cleisthenes' democratic constitution of Athens of 508 BCE, was celebrated with two commemorative drachma coins in 1993.

- 500 drachmas, silver, demos, democracy
- 10,000 drachmas, gold, Pericles

=== 1994 - Volleyball centennial ===
1994 saw the minting of two coins commemorating the 100 years since the creation of the game volleyball.

- 500 drachmas, silver, volleyball players
- 10,000 drachmas, gold, 100

=== 1996 - Atlanta Olympic Games ===
The XXVI Olympic games in Atlanta were celebrated with the minting of three coins. Their common obverse shows the Kallimarmaro stadium in Athens.

- 1,000 drachmas, silver, ancient olympic stadion race
- 1,000 drachmas, silver, ancient olympic wrestling
- 20,000 drachmas, gold, ancient olympic javelin throw

=== 2000 - Athens Olympic Games ===
Released for the upcoming 2004 XXVIII Olympic games to be held in Athens, these six 500 drachmas coins were produced in copper-nickel. Each had a mintage of 4,000,000. They could be purchased as complete sets. The obverse showed a victor's laurel crown. Reverse designs were as follows:

- The 2004 Olympic Medal
- Spyridon Louis
- Baron Pierre de Coubertin
- Diagoras of Rhodes
- Kindling the Olympic flame at Olympia
- The Stadium at Olympia

=== 2000 - the last drachma ===
The last commemorative Greek drachma coin before the introduction of the euro was a gold version of the last single drachma circulation coin.

- 1 drachma, gold, Laskarina Bouboulina, ship
