= Euro gold and silver commemorative coins (France): 2006 =

France has a rich selection of Gold and Silver commemorative coins. These coins are minted by Monnaie de Paris, which is a state owned industrial and commercial company.

== Gold ==
=== €10 ===
ACF - 100th Anniversary of the ACF's 1st Grand Prix
| Designer: | | Mint: - | |
| Value: €10.00 | Alloy: Gold 920/1000 | Quantity: 500 | Quality: Proof |
| Issued: 2006 | Diameter: 22 | Weight: 8.45 | Market Value: |
On 16 January 1906 the French Automobile Club commissioned the department of Sarthe to organise its Grand Prix. And so was born the mythical Le Mans race circuit. That was the historical start of two of today's most famous car races : the French Formula 1 Grand Prix and the Le Mans 24 hours.
Arc de Triomphe
| Designer: | | Mint: - | |
| Value: €10.00 | Alloy: Gold 920/1000 | Quantity: 500 | Quality: Proof |
| Issued: 2006 | Diameter: 22 | Weight: 8.45 | Market Value: |
In 1806, Napoleon commissioned Chalgrin to build a triumphal arch to honour the French armies. Completed in 1836, this symbolic monument with its imposing architecture evokes the marches of all the victories !
Benjamin FRANKLIN
| Designer: Sternberg/Atelier de gravure | | Mint: - | |
| Value: €10.00 | Alloy: Gold 920/1000 | Quantity: 1,000 | Quality: Proof |
| Issued: 2006 | Diameter: 22 | Weight: 8.45 | Market Value: |
Obverse : Benjamin FRANKLIN's effigy - His birth and death dates - Beside, representation of his celebrated experience in 1752 with his famous kite which verified the nature of electricity. The words THE FRIEND OF FRANCE reminds the deep longstanding friendship between France and the United States he helped to create. Reverse : Between the flags of the 2 countries four words; Philosopher, Statesman, Writer and Scientist remembering how famous he was. Available from 12 December 2005 on
BERNADOTTE Marshal under Napoleon
| Designer: Atelier de Gravure | | Mint: - | |
| Value: €10.00 | Alloy: Gold 920/1000 | Quantity: 1,000 | Quality: Proof |
| Issued: 2006 | Diameter: 22 | Weight: 8.45 | Market Value: |
Marshal under Napoleon then King of Sweden and Norway ! Voluntarily enlisted in the Royal Army at the age of 17 he was promoted to Marshal by Napoleon in 1804 ! He was then chosen in 1810 by the Swedish States General to become the Crown Prince of Sweden. He was crowned Charles XIV, King of Sweden and Norway on 5 February 1818.
JULES VERNE-Five weeks in a balloon
| Designer: | | Mint: - | |
| Value: €10.00 | Alloy: Gold 920/1000 | Quantity: 500 | Quality: Proof |
| Issued: 2006 | Diameter: 22 | Weight: 8.45 | Market Value: |
Samuel Fergusson, accompanied by Dick Kennedy and his servant Joe, are crossing Africa from Zanzibar to Senegal, in a balloon. Their objective is to map out the countries over which they fly; and to discover the Nile's spring. Jules Verne tells this story as a symbolic and geographic research of the springs : that of the Nile and that of Joe his faithful servant.
JULES VERNE-Journey to the centre of the earth
| Designer: | | Mint: - | |
| Value: €10.00 | Alloy: Gold 920/1000 | Quantity: 500 | Quality: Proof |
| Issued: 2006 | Diameter: 22 | Weight: 8.45 | Market Value: |
In this novel mixing imaginary and realism, Pr. Lidenbrock and is nephew are searching for an alchemist that pretends he succeeded in travelling to the centre of the Earth. A fantastic trip in the Earth's centre is lived be the heroes. They discover a parallel world, remembering the past; in which pre-historical animals are living! Jules Verne is there imagining a time machine enabling to travel in space and time!
JULES VERNE-Michel Strogoff
| Designer: | | Mint: - | |
| Value: €10.00 | Alloy: Gold 920/1000 | Quantity: 500 | Quality: Proof |
| Issued: 2006 | Diameter: 22 | Weight: 8.45 | Market Value: |
Let's follow on our travel in the fantastic world of Jules Verne with the story of Michel Strogoff, special messenger of the Tsar of Russia. He has to go through the steppes of Siberia, to inform the Tsar's brother (in Irkoutsk) about the presence of a conspirator in his friends & relatives. A trip of more than 5500 km !

=== €20 ===
Paul CEZANNE
| Designer: Atelier de Gravure | | Mint: - | |
| Value: €20.00 | Alloy: Gold 920/1000 | Quantity: 500 | Quality: Proof |
| Issued: 2006 | Diameter: | Weight: 17 | Market Value: |
It is the 100th anniversary of Paul Cézanne's death in Aix, "the father of us all" to quote Picasso. From the Master of Aix who, from his "impressionist" touch to his constructive period announcing cubism and the revolution of modern painting. Here is a selfportrait (around 1875) on the obverse, and on the reverse one of the five versions that he painted of the Card Players.
The Sower
| Designer: Atelier de Gravure | | Mint: - | |
| Value: €20.00 | Alloy: Gold 920/1000 | Quantity: 1,000 | Quality: Proof |
| Issued: 2006 | Diameter: 31 | Weight: 17 | Market Value: |
Since 2002 the obverse is inspired by the Roty's Sower (1897). The reverse commemorates the 25th anniversary of the law abolishing the death penalty (9 October 1981) in France.

== Silver ==
=== €0.25 ===
AGBU 06 YEAR OF THE DOG
| Designer: Atelier de gravure | | Mint: - | |
| Value: €0.25 | Alloy: Silver 900/1000 | Quantity: 10,000 | Quality: Brilliant Uncirculated |
| Issued: 2006 | Diameter: 37 | Weight: 22.2 | Market Value: |
Obverse : Representation, of the Shar Peï, whom the origin could take place 200 years before JC. He has been introduced in France since 1983.Energy, sportivity, and fidelity are the main characteristics of the bred. Reverse : Portrait of the famous French fabulist Jean de la Fontaine surrounded by the 12 Chinese zodiacal signs, animals which he told marvellous stories about....
BERNADOTTE Marshal under Napoleon
| Designer: Atelier de Gravure | | Mint: - | |
| Value: €0.25 | Alloy: Silver 900/1000 | Quantity: 10,000 | Quality: Brilliant Uncirculated |
| Issued: 2006 | Diameter: 37 | Weight: 22.2 | Market Value: |
Marshal under Napoleon then King of Sweden and Norway ! Voluntarily enlisted in the Royal Army at the age of 17 he was promoted to Marshal by Napoleon in 1804 ! He was then chosen in 1810 by the Swedish States General to become the Crown Prince of Sweden. He was crowned Charles XIV, King of Sweden and Norway on 5 February 1818.
Hôpitaux de France Foundation
| Designer: Atelier de Gravure | | Mint: - | |
| Value: €0.25 | Alloy: Silver 900/1000 | Quantity: 50,000 | Quality: Brilliant Uncirculated |
| Issued: 2006 | Diameter: 37 | Weight: 22.2 | Market Value: |
For the first time, a collector's coin will be minted in Euro by Monnaie de Paris in honour of a Foundation, the Hôpitaux de France Foundation, presided by Bernadette Chirac and sponsored by David Douillet. In 2006, the TGV "pièces jaunes" (yellow coins) operation will celebrate its 10th anniversary. This is the world's biggest money box scheme. Obverse : a TGV train and a "yellow coin" operation money money box with a map of France in the background. Reverse : the logotype of the Hôpitaux de Paris - Hôpitaux de France Foundation.

=== €1.00 ===
The Sower
| Designer: Atelier de Gravure | | Mint: - | |
| Value: €1.00 | Alloy: Silver 900/1000 | Quantity: 10,000 | Quality: Proof |
| Issued: 2006 | Diameter: 37 | Weight: 22.2 | Market Value: |
Since 2002 the obverse is inspired by the Roty's Sower (1897). The reverse commemorates the 25th anniversary of the law abolishing the death penalty (9 October 1981) in France.

=== €1.50 ===
ACF - 100th Anniversary of the ACF's 1st Grand Prix
| Designer: | | Mint: - | |
| Value: €1.50 | Alloy: Silver 900/1000 | Quantity: 5,000 | Quality: Proof |
| Issued: 2006 | Diameter: 37 | Weight: 22.2 | Market Value: |
On 16 January 1906 the French Automobile Club commissioned the department of Sarthe to organise its Grand Prix. And so was born the mythical Le Mans race circuit. That was the historical start of two of today's most famous car races : the French Formula 1 Grand Prix and the Le Mans 24 hours.
Arc de Triomphe
| Designer: | | Mint: - | |
| Value: €1.50 | Alloy: Silver 900/1000 | Quantity: 10,000 | Quality: Proof |
| Issued: 2006 | Diameter: 37 | Weight: 22.2 | Market Value: |
In 1806, Napoleon commissioned Chalgrin to build a triumphal arch to honour the French armies. Completed in 1836, this symbolic monument with its imposing architecture evokes the marches of all the victories !
JULES VERNE-Five weeks in a balloon
| Designer: | | Mint: - | |
| Value: €1.50 | Alloy: Silver 900/1000 | Quantity: 2,287 | Quality: Proof |
| Issued: 2006 | Diameter: 37 | Weight: 22.2 | Market Value: |
Samuel Fergusson, accompanied by Dick Kennedy and his servant Joe, are crossing Africa from Zanzibar to Senegal, in a balloon. Their objective is to map out the countries over which they fly; and to discover the Nile's spring. Jules Verne tells this story as a symbolic and geographic research of the springs : that of the Nile and that of Joe his fidel servant.
JULES VERNE-Journey to the centre of the earth
| Designer: | | Mint: - | |
| Value: €1.50 | Alloy: Silver 900/1000 | Quantity: 2,411 | Quality: Proof |
| Issued: 2006 | Diameter: 37 | Weight: 22.2 | Market Value: |
In this novel mixing imaginary and realism, Pr. Lidenbrock and is nephew are searching for an alchemist that pretends he succeeded in travelling to the centre of the Earth. A fantastic trip in the Earth's centre is lived be the heroes. They discover a parallel world, remembering the past; in which pre-historical animals are living! Jules Verne is there imagining a time machine enabling to travel in space and time!
JULES VERNE-Michel Strogoff
| Designer: | | Mint: - | |
| Value: €1.50 | Alloy: Silver 900/1000 | Quantity: 2,468 | Quality: Proof |
| Issued: 2006 | Diameter: 37 | Weight: 22.2 | Market Value: |
Let's follow on our travel in the fantastic world of Jules Verne with the story of Michel Strogoff, special messenger of the Tsar of Russia. He has to go through the steppes of Siberia, to inform the Tsar's brother (in Irkoutsk) about the presence of a conspirator in his friends & relatives. A trip of more than 5500 km !
Paul CEZANNE
| Designer: Atelier de Gravure | | Mint: - | |
| Value: €1.50 | Alloy: Silver 900/1000 | Quantity: 5,000 | Quality: Proof |
| Issued: 2006 | Diameter: 37 | Weight: 22.2 | Market Value: |
It is the 100th anniversary of Paul Cézanne's death in Aix, "the father of us all" to quote Picasso. From the Master of Aix who, from his "impressionist" touch to his constructive period announcing cubism and the revolution of modern painting. Here is a selfportrait (around 1875) on the obverse, and on the reverse one of the five versions that he painted of the Card Players.
The Dome of the Invalides
| Designer: | | Mint: - | |
| Value: €1.50 | Alloy: Silver 900/1000 | Quantity: 10,000 | Quality: Proof |
| Issued: 2006 | Diameter: 37 | Weight: 22.2 | Market Value: |
When Jules-Hardouin Mansart, François Mansart's great nephew handed the key to the church of the Dome of Les Invalides to Louis XIV on 28 August 1706, the king had been waiting 35 years for this building to be completed to home "all the wounded and aged officers and soldiers". The Dome is one of the greatest architectural successes of the 17th century. The Church of the Dome, now a military necropole, has housed Napoleon I's tomb since 1840.

=== €5 ===
Proof set - 2006
| Designer: | | Mint: - | |
| Value: €5 | Alloy: Silver | Quantity: 10,000 | Quality: Proof |
| Issued: 2006 | Diameter: | Weight: | Market Value: |
1c,2c,5c,10c,20c,50c,1euro,2euros + 5euros Silver Proof The set BE includes a currency with facial value of 5 euros, only available in this set. As there are only 10,000 specimens in the whole world, this set will be soon invaluable.

=== €20 ===
Arc de Triomphe
| Designer: | | Mint: - | |
| Value: €20.00 | Alloy: Silver 950/1000 | Quantity: 500 | Quality: Proof |
| Issued: 2006 | Diameter: 50 | Weight: 155.5 | Market Value: |
In 1806, Napoleon commissioned Chalgrin to build a triumphal arch to honour the French armies. Completed in 1836, this symbolic monument with its imposing architecture evokes the marches of all the victories !
Benjamin FRANKLIN
| Designer: Sternberg/Atelier de gravure | | Mint: - | |
| Value: €20.00 | Alloy: Silver 950/1000 | Quantity: 500 | Quality: Proof |
| Issued: 2006 | Diameter: 50 | Weight: 155.5 | Market Value: |
Obverse : Benjamin FRANKLIN's effigy - His birth and death dates - Beside, representation of his celebrous experience in 1752 with his famous kite which verified the nature of electricity. The words THE FRIEND OF FRANCE reminds the deep longstanding friendship between France and the United States he helped to create. Reverse : Between the flags of the 2 countries four words; Philosopher, Statesman, Writer and Scientist remembering how famous he was. Available from 12 December 2005 on
JULES VERNE-Five weeks in a balloon
| Designer: | | Mint: - | |
| Value: €20.00 | Alloy: Silver 950/1000 | Quantity: 500 | Quality: Proof |
| Issued: 2006 | Diameter: 50 | Weight: 155.5 | Market Value: |
Samuel Fergusson, accompanied by Dick Kennedy and his servant Joe, are crossing Africa from Zanzibar to Senegal, in a balloon. Their objective is to map out the countries over which they fly; and to discover the Nile's spring. Jules Verne tells this story as a symbolic and geographic research of the springs : that of the Nile and that of Joe his faithful servant.
JULES VERNE-Journey to the centre of the earth
| Designer: | | Mint: - | |
| Value: €20.00 | Alloy: Silver 950/1000 | Quantity: 500 | Quality: Proof |
| Issued: 2006 | Diameter: 50 | Weight: 155.5 | Market Value: |
In this novel mixing imaginary and realism, Pr. Lidenbrock and is nephew are searching for an alchemist that pretends he succeeded in travelling to the centre of the Earth. A fantastic trip in the Earth's centre is lived be the heroes. They discover a parallel world, remembering the past; in which pre-historical animals are living! Jules Verne is there imagining a time machine enabling to travel in space and time!
JULES VERNE-Michel Strogoff
| Designer: Atelier de Gravure | | Mint: - | |
| Value: €20.00 | Alloy: Silver 950/1000 | Quantity: 500 | Quality: Proof |
| Issued: 2006 | Diameter: 50 | Weight: 155.5 | Market Value: |
Let's follow on our travel in the fantastic world of Jules Verne with the story of Michel Strogoff, special messenger of the Tsar of Russia. He has to go through the steppes of Siberia, to inform the Tsar's brother (in Irkoutsk) about the presence of a conspirator in his friends & relatives. A trip of more than 5500 km !
Paul CEZANNE
| Designer: Atelier de Gravure | | Mint: - | |
| Value: €20.00 | Alloy: Silver 950/1000 | Quantity: 500 | Quality: Proof |
| Issued: 2006 | Diameter: 50 | Weight: 155.5 | Market Value: |
It is the 100th anniversary of Paul Cézanne's death in Aix, "the father of us all" to quote Picasso.From the Master of Aix who, from his "impressionist" touch to his constructive period announcing cubism and the revolution of modern painting.Here is a selfportrait (around 1875) on the obverse, and on the reverse one of the five versions that he painted of the Card Players.
