= Euro gold and silver commemorative coins (France): 2002 =

France has a rich selection of Gold and Silver commemorative coins. These coins are minted by Monnaie de Paris, which is a state owned industrial and commercial company.

== 2002 ==
Europa 2002
Designer: -		Mint: -	
Value: €1.50	Alloy: Ag (900)	Quantity: 50,000	Quality: Proof
Issued: 2002	Diameter: 37 mm	Weight: 22.2 g	Market Value:
Europa 2002
Designer: -		Mint: -	
Value: €10	Alloy: Au (920)	Quantity: 3,000	Quality: Proof
Issued: 2002	Diameter: 22 mm	Weight: 8.45 g	Market Value:
Europa 2002
Designer: -		Mint: -	
Value: €20	Alloy: Au (920)	Quantity: 3,000	Quality: Proof
Issued: 2002	Diameter: 31 mm	Weight: 15.5 g	Market Value:
Europa 2002
Designer: -		Mint: -	
Value: €50	Alloy: Au (999)	Quantity: 2,000	Quality: Proof
Issued: 2002	Diameter: 37 mm	Weight: 31 g	Market Value:
Europa 2002
Designer: -		Mint: -	
Value: €100	Alloy: Au (999)	Quantity: 99	Quality: Proof
Issued: 2002	Diameter: 50 mm	Weight: 155.55 g	Market Value:
-
"Merci Le Franc"
Designer:		Mint: -	
Value: €5	Alloy: Ag (900), Au (750)	Quantity: 10,000	Quality: proof
Issued: 2002	Diameter: 37 mm	Weight: 24.9 g	Market Value:
"Merci Le Franc"
Designer:		Mint: -	
Value: €20	Alloy: Au (920)	Quantity: 5,000	Quality: proof
Issued: 2002	Diameter: 31 mm	Weight: 17 g	Market Value:
-
75th Anniversary of alone Atlantic crossing
Designer:		Mint: -	
Value: €1.50	Alloy: Ag (900)	Quantity: 10,000	Quality: proof
Issued: 2002	Diameter: 37 mm	Weight: 22.2 g	Market Value:
75th Anniversary of alone Atlantic crossing
Designer:		Mint: -	
Value: €20	Alloy: Au (920)	Quantity: 1,000	Quality: proof
Issued: 2002	Diameter: 31 mm	Weight: 17 g	Market Value:
75th Anniversary of alone Atlantic crossing
Designer:		Mint: -	
Value: €100	Alloy: Au (999)	Quantity: 99	Quality: proof
Issued: 2002	Diameter: 60 mm	Weight: 155,55 g	Market Value:
-
World cup Soccer 2002 "Allez La France"
Designer:		Mint: -	
Value: €0.25	Alloy: Ag (900)	Quantity: 10,000	Quality: proof
Issued: 2002	Diameter: 30 mm	Weight: 30 g	Market Value:
-
Mont Saint-Michel
Designer:		Mint: -	
Value: €1.50	Alloy: Ag (900)	Quantity: 10,000	Quality: Proof
Issued: 2002	Diameter: 37 mm	Weight: 22.2 g	Market Value:
Mont Saint-Michel
Designer:		Mint: -	
Value: €20	Alloy: Au (920)	Quantity: 1,000	Quality: Proof
Issued: 2002	Diameter: 31 mm	Weight: 17 g	Market Value:
This silver 1 ½euros coin depicts a site recognized as a "Marvel of the West". The Mount leaves undying memories to visitors due to the beauty of the site and architecture and the richness of its history. The spire of the gothic abbey and the superb construct
Montmartre
Designer:		Mint: -	
Value: €1.50	Alloy: Ag (900)	Quantity: 10,000	Quality: Proof
Issued: 2002	Diameter: 37 mm	Weight: 22.2 g	Market Value:
Montmartre
Designer:		Mint: -	
Value: €20	Alloy: Au (920)	Quantity: 1,000	Quality: Proof
Issued: 2002	Diameter: 31 mm	Weight: 17 g	Market Value:
The obverse of this silver 1 ½euros coin depicts the main tourist spots of one of the most picturesque quarters in Paris: the Sacré C?ur basilica, the Tertre Square, the Moulin Rouge and the Moulin de la Galette.
Children's Euro
Designer:		Mint: -	
Value: €0.25	Alloy: Cu	Quantity: 1,000,000	Quality: Proof
Issued: 2002	Diameter: 30 mm	Weight: 12.5 g	Market Value:
Children's Euro
Designer:		Mint: -	
Value: €0.25	Alloy: Ag (900)	Quantity: 10,000	Quality: Proof
Issued: 2002	Diameter: 30 mm	Weight: 13 g	Market Value:
Children's Euro
Designer:		Mint: -	
Value: €0.25	Alloy: Au (999)	Quantity: 5,000	Quality: Proof
Issued: 2002	Diameter: 15 mm	Weight: 3.11 g	Market Value:
-
Cinderella
Designer:		Mint: -	
Value: €1.50	Alloy: Silver 900/1000	Quantity: 9,987	Quality: Proof
Issued: 2002	Diameter: 37	Weight: 37	Market Value:
Cinderella
Designer:		Mint: -	
Value: €20.00	Alloy: Gold 920/1000	Quantity: 926	Quality: Proof
Issued: 2002	Diameter: 31	Weight: 17	Market Value:
Cinderella (1697) is a Charles Perrault's heroin and one of the most famous characters of the world of fairy tales. The story tells the eternal drama of a child persecuted by a malicious stepmother. Finally, the young girl will find true happiness while marrying
Pinocchio
Designer:		Mint: -	
Value: €1.50	Alloy: Silver 900/1000	Quantity: 9,928	Quality: Proof
Issued: 2002	Diameter: 37	Weight: 22.2	Market Value:
Pinocchio
Designer:		Mint: -	
Value: €20.00	Alloy: Gold 920/1000	Quantity: 1,000	Quality: Proof
Issued: 2002	Diameter: 31	Weight: 17	Market Value:
Pinocchio (1881), a small animated wood puppet, is the hero of a novel for young people by Carlo Collodi. The Fairy's moral: "One can always expect something good from kind-hearted children, even if they are a little mischievous" is confirmed by the happy
Snow White
Designer:		Mint: -	
Value: €1.50	Alloy: Ag (900)	Quantity: 9,761	Quality: Proof
Issued: 2002	Diameter: 37 mm	Weight: 22.2 g	Market Value:
Snow White
Designer:		Mint: -	
Value: €20.00	Alloy: Gold 920/1000	Quantity: 950	Quality: Proof
Issued: 2002	Diameter: 31	Weight: 17	Market Value:
What child has not feared for Snow White (1812), the touching character of the "German Stories and Fairy Tales of the past time" by the Grimm Brothers, pursued by a malicious queen...and freed once more by her Prince Charming!
Bicentennial of Victor Hugo’s birth
Designer:		Mint: -	
Value: €1.50	Alloy: Ag (900)	Quantity: 10,000	Quality: proof
Issued: 2002	Diameter: 37 mm	Weight: 22.2 g	Market Value:
Bicentennial of Victor Hugo’s birth
Designer:		Mint: -	
Value: €20	Alloy: Ag	Quantity: 500	Quality: proof
Issued: 2002	Diameter: 50 mm	Weight: 155.5 g	Market Value:
Bicentennial of Victor Hugo’s birth
Designer:		Mint: -	
Value: €20	Alloy: Au (920)	Quantity: 1,000	Quality: proof
Issued: 2002	Diameter: 31 mm	Weight: 17 g	Market Value:
-
