= Euro gold and silver commemorative coins (France): 2003 =

France has a rich selection of Gold and Silver commemorative coins. These coins are minted by Monnaie de Paris, which is a state owned industrial and commercial company.

== Gold ==
=== €20 ===
Europa 2003
Designer:		Mint: -	
Value: €0.25	Alloy: Ag (900)	Quantity: 20,000	Quality:
Issued: 2003	Diameter: 30 mm	Weight: 13 g	Market Value:
Europa 2003
Designer:		Mint: -	
Value: €1.50	Alloy: Ag (900)	Quantity: 40,000	Quality:
Issued: 2003	Diameter: 37 mm	Weight: 22.2 g	Market Value:
Europa 2003
Designer:		Mint: -	
Value: €10	Alloy: Au (920)	Quantity: 7,000	Quality:
Issued: 2003	Diameter: 22 mm	Weight: 8.45 g	Market Value:
Europa 2003
Designer:		Mint: -	
Value: €20	Alloy: Au (920)	Quantity: 3,000	Quality:
Issued: 2003	Diameter: 31 mm	Weight: 17 g	Market Value:
Europa 2003
Designer:		Mint: -	
Value: €50	Alloy: Au (999)	Quantity: 2,000	Quality:
Issued: 2003	Diameter: 37 mm	Weight: 31.1 g	Market Value:
Europa
Designer:		Mint: -	
Value: €50.00	Alloy: Silver 950/1000	Quantity: 10,000	Quality: Proof
Issued: 2003	Diameter: 100	Weight: 1000	Market Value:
Europa 2003
Designer:		Mint: -	
Value: €100	Alloy: Au (929)	Quantity: 99	Quality:
Issued: 2003	Diameter: -	Weight: 155.2 g	Market Value:
-
Alice in Wonderland
Designer:		Mint: -	
Value: €20.00	Alloy: Gold 920/1000	Quantity: 1,000	Quality: Proof
Issued: 2003	Diameter: 31	Weight: 17	Market Value:
The marvellous treasure of this tale for children had already found a new expression in this coin devoted to Alice in Wonderland. The Monnaie strike it for pleasure of returning to our childhood.
Hansel and Gretel
Designer:		Mint: -	
Value: €20.00	Alloy: Gold 920/1000	Quantity: 1,000	Quality: Proof
Issued: 2003	Diameter: 31	Weight: 17	Market Value:
The marvellous treasure of this tale for children had already found a new expression in this coin devoted to Hansel and Gretel. The Monnaie strikes it for pleasure of going back to our childhood.
Sleeping Beauty
Designer:		Mint: -	
Value: €20.00	Alloy: Gold 920/1000	Quantity: 1,000	Quality: Proof
Issued: 2003	Diameter: 31	Weight: 17	Market Value:
The marvellous treasure of this tale for children had already found a new expression in this coin devoted to Sleeping Beauty. The Monnaie strikes it for pleasure of returning to our childhood.
Travelling around the world- Flight Paris Tokyo
Designer:		Mint: -	
Value: €20.00	Alloy: Gold 920/1000	Quantity: 1,000	Quality: Proof
Issued: 2003	Diameter: 31	Weight: 17	Market Value:
Travelling around the world- Flight Paris Tokyo Monnaie de Paris illustrates means of transport symbols of history, with this coin.Who can ever forget the fabulous Paris-Tokyo Air France flight.
Travelling around the world- The Normandie
Designer:		Mint: -	
Value: €20.00	Alloy: Gold 920/1000	Quantity: 1,000	Quality: Proof
Issued: 2003	Diameter: 31	Weight: 17	Market Value:
Travelling around the world- The Normandie. Monnaie de Paris illustrates means of transport symbols of history, with this coin.Who can ever forget the fabulous ocean crossing on board the Normandie? Most of the world population!
Travelling around the world- The Orient Express
Designer:		Mint: -	
Value: €20.00	Alloy: Gold 920/1000	Quantity: 1,000	Quality: Proof
Issued: 2003	Diameter: 31	Weight: 17	Market Value:
Travelling around the world- The Orient Express Monnaie de Paris illustrates means of transport symbols of history, with this coin.Who can ever forget the train journey on the famous Orient Express.

== Silver ==
=== €1.50 ===
Alice in Wonderland
Designer:		Mint: -	
Value: €1.50	Alloy: Silver 900/1000	Quantity: 3,096	Quality: Proof
Issued: 2003	Diameter: 37	Weight: 22.2	Market Value:
The marvellous treasure of this tale for children had already found a new expression in this coin devoted to Alice in Wonderland. The Monnaie strike it for pleasure of returning to our childhood.
Chambord
Designer:		Mint: -	
Value: €1.50	Alloy: Silver 900/1000	Quantity: 10,000	Quality: Proof
Issued: 2003	Diameter: 37	Weight: 22.2	Market Value:
Chambord, a pure masterpiece of Renaissance architecture, was erected on the initiative of François I.
Hansel and Gretel
Designer:		Mint: -	
Value: €1.50	Alloy: Silver 900/1000	Quantity: 3,124	Quality: Proof
Issued: 2003	Diameter: 37	Weight: 22.2	Market Value:
The marvellous treasure of this tale for children had already found a new expression in this coin devoted to Hansel and Gretel. The Monnaie strikes it for pleasure of returning to our childhood.
Sleeping Beauty
Designer:		Mint: -	
Value: €1.50	Alloy: Silver 900/1000	Quantity: 10,000	Quality: Proof
Issued: 2003	Diameter: 37	Weight: 22.2	Market Value:
The marvellous treasure of this tale for children had already found a new expression in this coin devoted to Sleeping Beauty. The Monnaie strike it for pleasure of returning to our childhood.
Travelling around the world- Flight Paris Tokyo
Designer:		Mint: -	
Value: €1.50	Alloy: Silver 900/1000	Quantity: 15,000	Quality: Proof
Issued: 2003	Diameter: 37	Weight: 22.2	Market Value:
Travelling around the world- Flight Paris Tokyo Monnaie de Paris illustrates means of transport symbols of history, with this coin.Who can ever forget the fabulous Paris-Tokyo Air France flight.
Travelling around the world- The Normandie
Designer:		Mint: -	
Value: €1.50	Alloy: Silver 900/1000	Quantity: 15,000	Quality: Proof
Issued: 2003	Diameter: 37	Weight: 22.2	Market Value:
Travelling around the world- The Normandie. Monnaie de Paris illustrates means of transport symbols of history, with this coin.Who can ever forget the fabulous ocean crossing on board the Normandie? Most of the world population!
Travelling around the world- The Orient Express
Designer:		Mint: -	
Value: €1.50	Alloy: Silver 900/1000	Quantity: 15,000	Quality: Proof
Issued: 2003	Diameter: 37	Weight: 22.2	Market Value:
Travelling around the world- The Orient Express. Monnaie de Paris illustrates means of transport symbols of history, with this coin.Who can ever forget the train journey on the famous Orient Express!
