= Euro gold and silver commemorative coins (France): 2007 =

France has a rich selection of gold and silver commemorative coins. These coins are minted by Monnaie de Paris, which is a state owned industrial and commercial company.

== Gold ==
=== €5 ===
The Sower
Designer: Atelier de Gravure		Mint: -	
Value: €5.00	Alloy: Gold 920/1000	Quantity: 500	Quality: Proof
Issued: 2007	Diameter: 31	Weight: 17	Market Value:
Since 2002 the obverse is inspired by the Roty's Sower (1897) emblem of French currency for more than a currency. The reverse commemorates the 5th anniversary of the money euro.
The Sower
Designer: Atelier de Gravure		Mint: -	
Value: €5.00	Alloy: Gold 999.99%	Quantity: 20,000	Quality: Proof
Issued: 2007	Diameter: 14	Weight: 1.244	Market Value:
Since 2002 the obverse is inspired by the Roty's Sower (1897) emblem of French currency for more than a currency. The reverse commemorates the 5th anniversary of the money euro.

=== €10 ===
Airbus A380
Designer: Atelier de Gravure		Mint: -	
Value: €10.00	Alloy: Gold 920/1000	Quantity: 1,000	Quality: Proof
Issued: 2007	Diameter: 22	Weight: 8.45	Market Value:
Following a custom initiated in 1999, there is a new Europa coin for the year 2007. It has retained the magnificent symbolic obverse of the first coins, portraying the goddess Euro. On the reverse is shown the A380 plane.
Aristide de Sousa Mendes Consul of Portugal
Designer: Atelier de Gravure		Mint: -	
Value: €10.00	Alloy: Gold 920/1000	Quantity: 500	Quality: Proof
Issued: 2007	Diameter: 22	Weight: 8.45	Market Value:
This coin has been issued in honour of Aristides de Sousa Mendes do Amaral e Abranche, a Portuguese diplomat posted to Bordeaux. During the debacle of 1940, he refused to obey the orders of his government, and he delivered visas to refugees of all nationalities who needed to flee from France.
Astérix - La Liberté
Designer: Atelier de Gravure		Mint: -	
Value: €10.00	Alloy: Gold 920/1000	Quantity: 500	Quality: Proof
Issued: 2007	Diameter: 22	Weight: 8.45	Market Value:
Christian DIOR
Designer: Atelier de Gravure		Mint: -	
Value: €10.00	Alloy: Gold 920/1000	Quantity: 500	Quality: Proof
Issued: 2007	Diameter: 22	Weight: 8.45	Market Value:
Monnaie de Paris is paying a tribute to Christian Dior on the occasion of the 50th anniversary of his death. The Fashion House t 30 avenue Montaigne is the inevitable symbol of the "New Look" launched by Christian Dior. In just ten years, from 1947 to 1957, the fashion designer created a fashion label that became famous all over the world.
Hergé and Tintin
Designer: Atelier de Gravure		Mint: -	
Value: €10.00	Alloy: Gold 920/1000	Quantity: 1,000	Quality: Proof
Issued: 2007	Diameter: 22	Weight: 8.45	Market Value:
Monnaie de Paris honours the creator of Tintin, Georges Remi known as Hergé, by issuing six coins, all coloured with resin, illustrating the famous globe-trotting reporter. This coin presents Tintin with his creator Hergé.
Horseriding Pekin
Designer: Atelier de Gravure		Mint: -	
Value: €10.00	Alloy: Gold 920/1000	Quantity: 1,000	Quality: Proof
Issued: 2007	Diameter: 22	Weight: 8.45	Market Value:
In tribute to the great sport event taking place in Beijing in 2008, Monnaie de Paris is issuing a coin in gold commemorating this discipline.
La Fayette
Designer: Atelier de Gravure		Mint: -	
Value: €10.00	Alloy: Gold 920/1000	Quantity: 500	Quality: Proof
Issued: 2007	Diameter: 22	Weight: 8.45	Market Value:
This coin commemorates the 250th anniversary of the birth of Marie Paul Yves Roch Gilbert Motier, Marquis de La Fayette. The reverse shows Lafayette on the Hermione on his way to join the American Army in 1780. A close friend George Washington and staff officer, he was appointed general and the division commander.
Paul Emile Victor
Designer: Atelier de Gravure		Mint: -	
Value: €10.00	Alloy: Gold 920/1000	Quantity: 500	Quality: Proof
Issued: 2007	Diameter: 22	Weight: 8.45	Market Value:
This coin commemorates the birth of Paul-Emile VICTOR: ethnographer and polar logistician; He was internationally well known. He was a precursor in ecology and a talented drawer. Obverse: Paul-Emile VICTOR on the Pole Reverse: logo of the International Polar Year.
Pont-Neuf
Designer: Atelier de Gravure		Mint: -	
Value: €10.00	Alloy: Gold 920/1000	Quantity: 500	Quality: Proof
Issued: 2007	Diameter: 22	Weight: 8.45	Market Value:
The Pont-Neuf, the oldest bridge in Paris was necessary to open up Paris, which even in those days suffered from traffic jams. As part of an urban development plan, il was completed in 1607, during the reign of Henri IV. The obverse shows the Monnaie de Paris building at the end of the Pont-Neuf.
RENAULT F1
Designer: Atelier de Gravure		Mint: -	
Value: €10.00	Alloy: Gold 920/1000	Quantity: 500	Quality: Proof
Issued: 2007	Diameter: 22	Weight: 8.45	Market Value:
RENAULT: 30 years of Formula 1.
The Cannes festival
Designer: Atelier de Gravure		Mint: -	
Value: €10.00	Alloy: Gold 920/1000	Quantity: 500	Quality: Proof
Issued: 2007	Diameter: 22	Weight: 8.45	Market Value:
Monnaie de Paris pays tribute to the 60th anniversary of one of the most widely covered film festival among the press.
The Great Wall of China UNESCO
Designer: Atelier de Gravure		Mint: -	
Value: €10.00	Alloy: Gold 920/1000	Quantity: 500	Quality: Proof
Issued: 2007	Diameter: 22	Weight: 8.45	Market Value:
The Great Wall of China is one of the 830 cultural and natural sites included in the UNESCO World Heritage List. The headquarters of ONESCO has been based in Paris in 1948.
Vauban
Designer: Atelier de Gravure		Mint: -	
Value: €10.00	Alloy: Gold 920/1000	Quantity: 3,000	Quality: Proof
Issued: 2007	Diameter: 22	Weight: 8.45	Market Value:
Vauban devoted his entire life to developing a system of fortifications that bears his name. It is estimated that he contributed to improving the fortifications of about 300 towns and directed the creation of 37 new fortresses and fortified harbours. The coin dedicated to Vauban was selected to be the French coin in the Trans-European series for 2007.
World Cup Rugby
Designer: Atelier de Gravure		Mint: -	
Value: €10.00	Alloy: Gold 920/1000	Quantity: 500	Quality: Proof
Issued: 2007	Diameter: 22	Weight: 8.45	Market Value:
The Rugby World Cup for 2007 will take place in France for the first time since it was inaugurated. The Monnaie de Paris is celebrating this sports event with a €10 1/4oz Gold coin quality Proof mintage 500 items.
YEAR OF THE PIG
Designer:		Mint: -	
Value: €10.00	Alloy: Gold 920/1000	Quantity: 500	Quality: Proof
Issued: 2007	Diameter: 22	Weight: 8.45	Market Value:
Obverse: Representation of the Pig Reverse: Portrait of the famous French fabulist Jean de la Fontaine surrounded by the 12 Chinese zodiacal signs, animals which he told marvellous stories about.

=== €20 ===
Astérix et Cléopâtre
Designer: Atelier de Gravure		Mint: -	
Value: €20.00	Alloy: Gold 920/1000	Quantity: 500	Quality: Proof
Issued: 2007	Diameter: 31	Weight: 17	Market Value:
Brocéliande
Designer: Atelier de Gravure		Mint: -	
Value: €20.00	Alloy: Gold 920/1000	Quantity: 500	Quality: Proof
Issued: 2007	Diameter: 31	Weight: 17	Market Value:
On the Obverse Merlin's face above Excalibur sword and a Triskell decorated targe. In the background the Brocéliande forest and the famous castle. On the reverse 2 dragons.
Edgar Degas
Designer: Atelier de Gravure		Mint: -	
Value: €20.00	Alloy: Gold 920/1000	Quantity: 500	Quality: Proof
Issued: 2007	Diameter: 30	Weight: 17	Market Value:
Monnaie de Paris pays homage to the Impressionist movement by issuing a coin in a rectangular shape for the first time. It illustrates a painting by Edgar Degas, the Etoile or Dancer on stage (1878 - Orsay Museum).
Stanislas LESZCZYNSKI
Designer: Atelier de Gravure		Mint: -	
Value: €20.00	Alloy: Gold 920/1000	Quantity: 500	Quality: Proof
Issued: 2007	Diameter: 31	Weight: 17	Market Value:
King of Poland from 1704 to 1709 under the name of Stanislas the First, and again from 1733 to 1739, he became Duc of Lorraine and de Bar as a result of the Treaty of Vienna signed in 1738.He held this title until he died. He gave his name to the largest square in Nancy. He was connected with France through the marriage of his daughter Marie Leszczynska, to Louis XV in 1725.
The Little Prince and the fox
Designer: Atelier de Gravure		Mint: -	
Value: €20.00	Alloy: Gold 920/1000	Quantity: 2,000	Quality: Proof
Issued: 2007	Diameter: 31	Weight: 17	Market Value:
Three themes were selected from the exquisitely poetic atmosphere of the famous book by Antoine de Saint-Exupéry to celebrate the 60th anniversary of the first edition of Le Petit Prince. The silver Proof denominations are coloured with resin.
The Little Prince laying on the grass
Designer:		Mint: -	
Value: €20.00	Alloy: Gold 920/1000	Quantity: 2,000	Quality: Proof
Issued: 2007	Diameter: 31	Weight: 17	Market Value:
Three themes were selected from the exquisitely poetic atmosphere of the famous book by Antoine de Saint-Exupéry to celebrate the 60th anniversary of the first edition of Le Petit Prince. The silver Proof denominations are coloured with resin.
World Cup Rugby
Designer: Atelier de Gravure		Mint: -	
Value: €20.00	Alloy: Gold 920/1000	Quantity: 500	Quality: Proof
Issued: 2007	Diameter: 31	Weight: 17	Market Value:
The Rugby World Cup for 2007 will take place in France for the first time since it was inaugurated. The Monnaie de Paris is celebrating this sports event with a €20 1/2oz Gold coin quality Proof mintage 500 items !

=== €50 ===
Airbus A380
Designer: Atelier de Gravure		Mint: -	
Value: €50.00	Alloy: Gold 999/1000	Quantity: 500	Quality: Proof
Issued: 2007	Diameter: 37	Weight: 31.105	Market Value:
Following a custom initiated in 1999, there is a new Europa coin for the year 2007. It has retained the magnificent symbolic obverse of the first coins, portraying the goddess Europa. On the reverse is shown the A380 plane.
Astérix - Le bouclier Arverne
Designer: Atelier de Gravure		Mint: -	
Value: €50.00	Alloy: Gold999/1000	Quantity: 500	Quality: Proof
Issued: 2007	Diameter: 37	Weight: 31.105	Market Value:
The Little Prince on his planet
Designer:		Mint: -	
Value: €50.00	Alloy: Gold 999/1000	Quantity: 2,000	Quality: Proof
Issued: 2007	Diameter: 37	Weight: 31.105	Market Value:
Three themes were selected from the exquisitely poetic atmosphere of the famous book by Antoine de Saint-Exupéry to celebrate the 60th anniversary of the first edition of Le Petit Prince. The silver Proof denominations are coloured with resin.
Tintin et Milou
Designer: Atelier de Gravure		Mint: -	
Value: €50.00	Alloy: Au 999/1000	Quantity: 500	Quality: Proof
Issued: 2007	Diameter: 37	Weight: 31.105	Market Value:
Monnaie de Paris honours the creator of Tintin, Georges Rémi known as Hergé, by issuing six coins, all coloured with resin, illustrating the famous globe-trotting reporter. This coin presents Tintin with his faithful companion, Snowy.

== Silver ==
=== €0.25 ===
Edgar Degas
Designer: Atelier de Gravure		Mint: -	
Value: €0.25	Alloy: Silver 900/1000	Quantity: 5,000	Quality: Brilliant Uncirculated
Issued: 2007	Diameter: 30	Weight: 13	Market Value:
Monnaie de Paris pays homage to the Impressionist movement by issuing a coin in a rectangular shape for the first time. It illustrates a painting by Edgar Degas, the Etoile or Dancer on stage (1878 - Orsay Museum).
La Fayette
Designer: Atelier de Gravure		Mint: -	
Value: €0.25	Alloy: Silver 900/1000	Quantity: 5,000	Quality: Brilliant uncirculated
Issued: 2007	Diameter: 30	Weight: 13	Market Value:
This coin commemorates the 250th anniversary of the birth of Marie Paul Yves Roch Gilbert Motier, Marquis de La Fayette. The reverse shows Lafayette on the Hermione on his way to join the American Army in 1780. A close friend George Washington and staff officer, he was appointed general and the division commander.
Vauban
Designer: Atelier de Gravure		Mint: -	
Value: €0.25	Alloy: Silver	Quantity: 5,000	Quality: Brilliant Uncirculated
Issued: 2007	Diameter: 30	Weight: 13	Market Value:
Vauban devoted his entire life to developing a system of fortifications that bears his name. It is estimated that he contributed to improving the fortifications of about 300 towns and directed the creation of 37 new fortresses and fortified harbours. The coin dedicated to Vauban was selected to be the French coin in the Trans-European series for 2007.
World Cup Rugby
Designer: Atelier de Gravure		Mint: -	
Value: €0.25	Alloy: Silver 900/1000	Quantity: 5,000	Quality: Brilliant Uncirculated
Issued: 2007	Diameter: 30	Weight: 13	Market Value:
The Rugby World Cup for 2007 will take place in France for the first time since it was inaugurated. The Monnaie de Paris is celebrating this sports event with a 1/€4 silver coin quality Brilliant uncirculated, mintage 5 000 items !
YEAR OF THE PIG
Designer: Atelier de Gravure		Mint: -	
Value: €0.25	Alloy: Silver 900/1000	Quantity: 10,000	Quality: Brilliant Uncirculated
Issued: 2007	Diameter: 37	Weight: 22.2	Market Value:
Obverse : Representation, of the Pig Reverse : Portrait of the famous French fabulist Jean de la Fontaine surrounded by the 12 Chinese zodiacal signs, animals which he told marvellous stories about....

=== €1.50 ===
Airbus A380
Designer: Atelier de Gravure		Mint: -	
Value: €1.50	Alloy: Silver 900/1000	Quantity: 5,000	Quality: Proof
Issued: 2007	Diameter: 37	Weight: 22.2	Market Value:
Following a custom initiated in 1999, there is a new Europa coin for the year 2007. It has retained the magnificent symbolic obverse of the first coins, portraying the goddess Euro. On the reverse is shown the A380 plane.
Aristide de Sousa Mendes Consul of Portugal
Designer: Atelier de Gravure		Mint: -	
Value: €1.50	Alloy: Silver 900/1000	Quantity: 3,000	Quality: Proof
Issued: 2007	Diameter: 37	Weight: 22.2	Market Value:
This coin has been issued in honour of Aristides de Sousa Mendes do Amaral e Abranche, a Portuguese diplomat posted to Bordeaux. During the debacle of 1940, he refused to obey the orders of his government, and he delivered visas to refugees of all nationalities who needed to flee from France.
Astérix - La Potion Magique
Designer: Atelier de Gravure		Mint: -	
Value: €1.50	Alloy: Silver 900/1000	Quantity: 3,000	Quality: Proof
Issued: 2007	Diameter: 37	Weight: 22.2	Market Value:
Astérix - Le Banquet
Designer: Atelier de Gravure		Mint: -	
Value: €1.50	Alloy: Silver 900/1000	Quantity: 3,000	Quality: Proof
Issued: 2007	Diameter: 37	Weight: 22.2	Market Value:
Astérix - Le retour de la chasse
Designer: Atelier de Gravure		Mint: -	
Value: €1.50	Alloy: Silver 900/1000	Quantity: 3,000	Quality: Proof
Issued: 2007	Diameter: 37	Weight: 22.2	Market Value:
Christian DIOR
Designer: Atelier de Gravure		Mint: -	
Value: €1.50	Alloy: Silver 900/1000	Quantity: 3,000	Quality: Proof
Issued: 2007	Diameter: 37	Weight: 22.2	Market Value:
Monnaie de Paris is paying a tribute to Christian Dior on the occasion of the 50th anniversary of his death. The Fashion House t 30 avenue Montaigne is the inevitable symbol of the "New Look" launched by Christian Dior. In just ten years, from 1947 to 1957, the fashion designer created a fashion label that became famous all over the world.
Horseriding Pekin
Designer: Atelier de Gravure		Mint: -	
Value: €1.50	Alloy: Silver 900/1000	Quantity: 10,000	Quality: Proof
Issued: 2007	Diameter: 37	Weight: 22.2	Market Value:
In tribute to the great sport event taking place in Beijing in 2008, Monnaie de Paris is issuing a coin commemorating this discipline.
Paul Emile Victor
Designer: Atelier de Gravure		Mint: -	
Value: €1.50	Alloy: Silver 900/1000	Quantity: 5,000	Quality: Proof
Issued: 2007	Diameter: 37	Weight: 22.2	Market Value:
This coin in silver commemorates the birth of Paul-Emile VICTOR: ethnographer and polar logistician; He was internationally well known. He was a precursor in ecology and a talented drawer. Obverse: Paul-Emile VICTOR on the Pole Reverse: logo of the International Polar Year.
Pont-Neuf
Designer: Atelier de Gravure		Mint: -	
Value: €1.50	Alloy: Silver 900/1000	Quantity: 3,000	Quality: Proof
Issued: 2007	Diameter: 37	Weight: 22.2	Market Value:
Wrong Image The Pont-Neuf, the oldest bridge in Paris was necessary to open up Paris, which even in those days suffered from traffic jams ! As part of an urban development plan, il was completed in 1607, during the reign of Henri IV. The obverse shows the Monnaie de Paris building at the end of the Pont-Neuf.
RENAULT F1
Designer: Atelier de Gravure		Mint: -	
Value: €1.50	Alloy: Silver 900/1000	Quantity: 5,000	Quality: Proof
Issued: 2007	Diameter: 37	Weight: 22.2	Market Value:
RENAULT : 30 years of Formula 1 !
The Great Wall of China UNESCO
Designer: Atelier de Gravure		Mint: -	
Value: €1.50	Alloy: Silver 900/1000	Quantity: 5,000	Quality: Proof
Issued: 2007	Diameter: 37	Weight: 22.2	Market Value:
The Great Wall of China is one of the 830 cultural and natural sites included in the UNESCO World Heritage List. The headquarters of ONESCO has been based in Paris in 1948.
Tintin and Chang
Designer: Atelier de Gravure		Mint: -	
Value: €1.50	Alloy: Silver 900/1000	Quantity: 10,000	Quality: Proof
Issued: 2007	Diameter: 37	Weight: 22.2	Market Value:
Monnaie de Paris honours the creator of Tintin, Georges Rémi known as Hergé, by issuing six coins, all coloured with resin, illustrating the famous globe-trotting reporter. This coin presents Tintin and his little Chinese friend Chang.
Tintin and the captain Haddock
Designer: Atelier de Gravure		Mint: -	
Value: €1.50	Alloy: Silver 900/1000	Quantity: 10,000	Quality: Proof
Issued: 2007	Diameter: 37	Weight: 22.2	Market Value:
Monnaie de Paris honours the creator of Tintin, Georges Rémi known as Hergé, by issuing six coins, all coloured with resin, illustrating the famous globe-trotting reporter. This coin presents Tintin and the sympathetic Captain Haddock !
Tintin and the professor Calculus
Designer: Atelier de Gravure		Mint: -	
Value: €1.50	Alloy: Silver 900/1000	Quantity: 10,000	Quality: Proof
Issued: 2007	Diameter: 37	Weight: 22.2	Market Value:
Monnaie de Paris honours the creator of Tintin, Georges Rémi known as Hergé, by issuing six coins, all coloured with resin, illustrating the famous globe-trotting reporter. This coin presents Tintin with the famous professor Calculus.
Vauban
Designer:		Mint: -	
Value: €1.50	Alloy: Silver	Quantity: 30,000	Quality: Proof
Issued: 2007	Diameter: 37	Weight: 22.2	Market Value:
Vauban devoted his entire life to developing a system of fortifi cations that bears his name. It is estimated that he contributed to improving the fortifi cations of about 300 towns and directed the creation of 37 new fortresses and fortifi ed harbours. The coin dedicated to Vauban was selected to be the French coin in the Trans-European series for 2007.
World Cup Rugby
Designer: Atelier de Gravure		Mint: -	
Value: €1.50	Alloy: Silver 900/1000	Quantity: 5,000	Quality: Proof
Issued: 2007	Diameter: 37	Weight: 22.2	Market Value:
The Rugby World Cup for 2007 will take place in France for the first time since it was inaugurated. The Monnaie de Paris is celebrating this sports event with a 1€1/2 silver coin quality Proof, mintage 5 000 items !

=== €5 ===
The Sower
Designer: Atelier de Gravure		Mint: -	
Value: €5.00	Alloy: Silver 900/1000	Quantity: 5,000	Quality: Proof
Issued: 2007	Diameter: 37	Weight: 22.2	Market Value:
Since 2002 the obverse is inspired by the Roty's Sower (1897) emblem of French currency for more than a currency. The reverse commemorates the 5th anniversary of the money euro.
The Sower
Designer: Atelier de Gravure		Mint: -	
Value: €5.00	Alloy: Silver 950/1000	Quantity: 500	Quality: Proof
Issued: 2007	Diameter: 50	Weight: 163.8	Market Value:
Since 2002 the obverse is inspired by the Roty's Sower (1897) emblem of French currency for more than a currency. The reverse commemorates the 5th anniversary of the money euro.

=== €15 ===
Proof Euro set 2007
Designer: Monnaie de Paris		Mint: -	
Value: €15	Alloy:	Quantity: 7,500	Quality: Proof
Issued: 2007	Diameter:	Weight:	Market Value:
1c,2c,5c,10c,20c,50c,1euro,2euros + 15euros

=== €20 ===
Astérix - La charge du village
Designer: Atelier de Gravure		Mint: -	
Value: €20.00	Alloy: Silver 950/1000	Quantity: 500	Quality: Proof
Issued: 2007	Diameter: 50	Weight: 155.5	Market Value:
Brocéliande
Designer: Atelier de Gravure		Mint: -	
Value: €20.00	Alloy: Silver 950/1000	Quantity: 500	Quality: Proof
Issued: 2007	Diameter: 50	Weight: 155.5	Market Value:
On the Obverse Merlin's face above Excalibur sword and a Triskell decorated targe. In the background the Brocéliande forest and the famous castle. On the reverse 2 dragons.
HERGE - Tintin and Milou
Designer: Atelier de Gravure		Mint: -	
Value: €20.00	Alloy: Silver 950/100	Quantity: 500	Quality: Proof
Issued: 2007	Diameter: 49	Weight: 100	Market Value:
Monnaie de Paris honours the creator of Tintin, Georges Rémi known as Hergé, by issuing six coins, all coloured with resin, illustrating the famous globe-trotting reporter. This coin presents Tintin with his faithful companion, Snowy.
Pont-Neuf - 400 years old
Designer: Atelier de Gravure		Mint: -	
Value: €20.00	Alloy: Silver 950/1000	Quantity: 500	Quality: Proof
Issued: 2007	Diameter: 50	Weight: 155.5	Market Value:
The Pont-Neuf, the oldest bridge in Paris was necessary to open up Paris, which even in those days suffered from traffic jams ! As part of an urban development plan, il was completed in 1607, during the reign of Henri IV. The obverse shows the Monnaie de Paris building at the end of the Pont-Neuf.
Stanislas LESZCZYNSKI
Designer: Atelier de Gravure		Mint: -	
Value: €20.00	Alloy: Silver 950/1000	Quantity: 500	Quality: Proof
Issued: 2007	Diameter: 50	Weight: 155.5	Market Value:
King of Poland from 1704 to 1709 under the name of Stanislas the First, and again from 1733 to 1739, he became Duc of Lorraine and de Bar as a result of the Treaty of Vienna signed in 1738.He held this title until he died. He gave his name to the largest square in Nancy. He was connected with France through the marriage of his daughter Marie Leszczynska, to Louis XV in 1725.
The Cannes festival
Designer: Atelier de Gravure		Mint: -	
Value: €20.00	Alloy: Silver 950/1000	Quantity: 500	Quality: Proof
Issued: 2007	Diameter: 50	Weight: 155.5	Market Value:
Monnaie de Paris pays tribute to the 60th anniversary of one of the most widely covered film festival among the press !
Vauban
Designer:		Mint: -	
Value: €20.00	Alloy: Silver	Quantity: 500	Quality: Proof
Issued: 2007	Diameter: 50	Weight: 155.5	Market Value:
Vauban devoted his entire life to developing a system of fortifi cations that bears his name. It is estimated that he contributed to improving the fortifications of about 300 towns and directed the creation of 37 new fortresses and fortifi ed harbours. The coin dedicated to Vauban was selected to be the French coin in the Trans-European series for 2007.

=== €50 ===
World Cup Rugby
Designer: Atelier de Gravure		Mint: -	
Value: €50.00	Alloy: Silver 950/1000	Quantity: 299	Quality: Brilliant uncirculated
Issued: 2007	Diameter: 100	Weight: 1000	Market Value:
The Rugby World Cup for 2007 will take place in France for the first time since it was inaugurated. The Monnaie de Paris is celebrating this sports event with a €20 1/2oz Gold coin quality Proof mintage 300 items !
