= Euro gold and silver commemorative coins (France): 2005 =

France has a rich selection of Gold and Silver commemorative coins. These coins are minted by Monnaie de Paris, which is a state owned industrial and commercial company.

== Cupro-nickel-alu ==
=== €0.25 ===
The Fantastic World of Jules Verne
Designer:		Mint: -	
Value: €0.25	Alloy: Cupro-nickel-alu	Quantity: 22,556	Quality: Brilliant Uncirculated
Issued: 2005	Diameter: 30	Weight: 11	Market Value:
This coin out of basic metal, which represents "the fantastic world" of Jules Verne, inaugurates a series on the works most representative of the writer, who will allure everybody.

== Gold ==
=== €10 ===
Austerlitz-Bicentennial of the victory
Designer:		Mint: -	
Value: €10.00	Alloy: Gold 900/1000	Quantity: 3,000	Quality: Proof
Issued: 2005	Diameter: 21	Weight: 6.41	Market Value:
This coin follows that emitted in 2005 for the bicentenary of the crowning of the Emperor. In December 1805, on the plate of Prazen, the large army of Napoleon crushes Austro-Russian, at the time of the battle of Austerlitz.
HELLO KITTY AT THE SPECTACLE
Designer: Atelier de Gravure		Mint: -	
Value: €10.00	Alloy: Gold 920/1000	Quantity: 1,000	Quality: Proof
Issued: 2005	Diameter: 22	Weight: 8.45	Market Value:
Hello Kitty visits Paris. Dressed up in a black evening dress, Hello Kitty is attending a spectacle at the Garnier Opéra.
JULES VERNE- 20 000 leagues under the sea
Designer:		Mint: -	
Value: €10.00	Alloy: Gold 920/1000	Quantity: 490	Quality: Proof
Issued: 2005	Diameter: 22	Weight: 8.45	Market Value:
Monnaie de Paris invites you into the fantastic world of Jules Verne, with tributes to 3 great work. 20 000 leagues under the sea.
JULES VERNE- Around the world in 80 days
Designer:		Mint: -	
Value: €10.00	Alloy: Gold 920/1000	Quantity: 611	Quality: Proof
Issued: 2005	Diameter: 22	Weight: 8.45	Market Value:
Monnaie de Paris invites you into the fantastic world of Jules Verne, with tributes to 3 great work. Around the world in 80 days.
JULES VERNE- From the Earth to the Moon
Designer:		Mint: -	
Value: €10.00	Alloy: Gold 920/1000	Quantity: 414	Quality: Proof
Issued: 2005	Diameter: 22	Weight: 8.45	Market Value:
Monnaie de Paris invites you into the fantastic world of Jules Verne, with tributes to 3 great work. From the Earth to the Moon.
The 50th anniversary of the European flag
Designer:		Mint: -	
Value: €10.00	Alloy: Gold 920/1000	Quantity: 3,000	Quality: Proof
Issued: 2005	Diameter: 22	Weight: 8.45	Market Value:
All the collector's coins offer to us the beautiful face of Europa as well as the European flag which celebrates its 50 years.

=== €20 ===
Austerlitz-Bicentennial of the victory
Designer:		Mint: -	
Value: €20.00	Alloy: Gold 920/1000	Quantity: 5,000	Quality: Proof
Issued: 2005	Diameter: 31	Weight: 17	Market Value:
This coin follows that emitted in 2004 for the bicentenary of the crowning of the Emperor. In December 1805, on the plate of Prazen, the large army of Napoleon crushes Austro-Russian, at the time of the battle of Austerlitz.
The Sower
Designer:		Mint: -	
Value: €20.00	Alloy: Gold 920/1000	Quantity: 1,500	Quality: Proof
Issued: 2005	Diameter: 31	Weight: 17	Market Value:
The obverse features the figure created by Oscar Roty, emblem of French currency for more than a century. The 2005 reverse tackles the theme of the separation of state and churches and celebrates the centenary of the law of 9 December 1905.

=== €50 ===
HELLO KITTY AND DANIEL IN VERSAILLES
Designer: Atelier de Gravure		Mint: -	
Value: €50.00	Alloy: Gold 999/1000	Quantity: 1,000	Quality: Proof
Issued: 2005	Diameter: 37	Weight: 31.104	Market Value:
Hello Kitty visits Paris. Hello Kitty and her friend Daniel, dressed up in prestigious clothes are dancing in the hall of mirror of the Chateau de Versailles. Sales only for France!

== Silver ==
=== €1.50 ===
Austerlitz-Bicentenal of the victory
Designer:		Mint: -	
Value: €1.50	Alloy: Silver 900/1000	Quantity: 15,000	Quality: Proof
Issued: 2005	Diameter: 37	Weight: 22.2	Market Value:
This coin follows that emitted in 2004 for the bicentenary of the crowning of the Emperor. In December 1805, on the plate of Prazen, the large army of Napoleon crushes Austro-Russian, at the time of the battle of Austerlitz.
BIATHLON
Designer:		Mint: -	
Value: €1.50	Alloy: Silver 900/1000	Quantity: 30,000	Quality: Proof
Issued: 2005	Diameter: 37	Weight: 22.2	Market Value:
The word biathlon comes from the Greek meaning two events. The combination of crosscountry skying and shooting, which form today's modern winter biathlon, originates from a hunting tradition dating back more than 4000 years. Never in this sport have French athletes had such a success. Congratulations to our world champion!
JULES VERNE- 20 000 leagues under the sea
Designer:		Mint: -	
Value: €1.50	Alloy: Silver 900/1000	Quantity: 4,462	Quality: Proof
Issued: 2005	Diameter: 37	Weight: 22.2	Market Value:
Monnaie de Paris invites you into the fantastic world of Jules Verne, with tributes to 3 great work. 20 000 leagues under the sea.
JULES VERNE- Around the world in 80 days
Designer:		Mint: -	
Value: €1.50	Alloy: Silver 900/1000	Quantity: 5,000	Quality: Proof
Issued: 2005	Diameter: 37	Weight: 22.2	Market Value:
Monnaie de Paris invites you into the fantastic world of Jules Verne, with tributes to 3 great work. Around the world in 80 days.
JULES VERNE- From the Earth to the Moon
Designer:		Mint: -	
Value: €1.50	Alloy: Silver 900/1000	Quantity: 4,336	Quality: Proof
Issued: 2005	Diameter: 37	Weight: 22.2	Market Value:
Monnaie de Paris invites you into the fantastic world of Jules Verne, with tributes to 3 great work. From the Earth to the Moon.
KITTY AND POODLE AT A CAFE
Designer: Atelier de Gravure		Mint: -	
Value: €1.50	Alloy: Silver 900/1000	Quantity: 4,000	Quality: Proof
Issued: 2005	Diameter: 37	Weight: 22.2	Market Value:
Hello Kitty visits Paris. How pleasant it is for her to have a drink on the terrasse of a caffe with her dog, Poodle ! Sales only for France!
KITTY ON THE CHAMPS-ELYSEES
Designer: Atelier de Gravure		Mint: -	
Value: €1.50	Alloy: Silver 900/1000	Quantity: 4,000	Quality: Proof
Issued: 2005	Diameter: 37	Weight: 22.2	Market Value:
Hello Kitty visits Paris. How pleasant it is to do shopping on the Champs Elysées, the prestigious avenue of the Capital !
The 50th anniversary of the European flag
Designer:		Mint: -	
Value: €1.50	Alloy: Silver 900/1000	Quantity: 15,000	Quality: Proof
Issued: 2005	Diameter: 37	Weight: 22.2	Market Value:
All the collector's coins offer to us the beautiful face of Europa as well as the European flag which celebrates its 50 years.
The end of the second World war
Designer:		Mint: -	
Value: €1.50	Alloy: Silver 900/1000	Quantity: 50,000	Quality: Proof
Issued: 2005	Diameter: 37	Weight: 22.2	Market Value:
To remind us of the strong link between the creation of the European Community and this long-lasting peace, the coin carries the inscription "Europe makes peace" and on the reverse "peace makes Europe".

=== €5 ===
Proof set- 2005
Designer:		Mint: -	
Value: €5	Alloy: Silver	Quantity: 10,000	Quality: Proof
Issued: 2005	Diameter:	Weight:	Market Value:
1c,2c,5c,10c,20c,50c,1euro,2euros + 5euros Silver Proof The set BE includes a currency with facial value of 5 euros, only available in this set. |-

=== €20 ===
From the Earth to the Moon
Designer:		Mint: -	
Value: €20.00	Alloy: Silver 950/1000	Quantity: 500	Quality: Proof
Issued: 2005	Diameter: 50	Weight: 155.5	Market Value:
Monnaie de Paris invites you into the fantastic world of Jules Verne, with tributes to 3 great work. From the Earth to the Moon.
JULES VERNE- 20 000 leagues under the sea
Designer:		Mint: -	
Value: €20.00	Alloy: Silver 950/1000	Quantity: 500	Quality: Proof
Issued: 2005	Diameter: 50	Weight: 155.5	Market Value:
Monnaie de Paris invites you into the fantastic world of Jules Verne, with tributes to 3 great work. 20 000 leagues under the sea.
JULES VERNE- Around the world in 80 days
Designer:		Mint: -	
Value: €20.00	Alloy: Silver 950/1000	Quantity: 500	Quality: Proof
Issued: 2005	Diameter: 50	Weight: 155.5	Market Value:
Monnaie de Paris invites you into the fantastic world of Jules Verne, with tributes to 3 great work. Around the world in 80 days.
