= Euro gold and silver commemorative coins (France): 2004 =

France has a rich selection of Gold and Silver commemorative coins. These coins are minted by Monnaie de Paris, which is a state owned industrial and commercial company.

== 2004 ==
Europa 2004
Designer:		Mint: -	
Value: €0.25	Alloy: Ag (900)	Quantity: 20,000	Quality:
Issued: 2004	Diameter: 30 mm	Weight: 13 g	Market Value:
Europa 2004
Designer:		Mint: -	
Value: €1.50	Alloy: Ag (900)	Quantity: 40,000	Quality:
Issued: 2004	Diameter: 37 mm	Weight: 22.2 g	Market Value:
Europa 2004
Designer:		Mint: -	
Value: €10.00	Alloy: (Au 920)	Quantity: 5,000	Quality: Proof
Issued: 2004	Diameter: 22	Weight: 8.45	Market Value:
Europa 2004
Designer:		Mint: -	
Value: €20	Alloy: Au (930)	Quantity: 3,000	Quality:
Issued: 2004	Diameter: 31 mm	Weight: 17 g	Market Value:
Europa 2004
Designer:		Mint: -	
Value: €50	Alloy: Au (999)	Quantity: 2,000	Quality:
Issued: 2004	Diameter: 37 mm	Weight: 31 g	Market Value:
Europa 2004
Designer:		Mint: -	
Value: €100	Alloy: Au (999)	Quantity: 99	Quality:
Issued: 2004	Diameter: 50 mm	Weight: 155.55 g	Market Value:
EUROPA 2004 : France announces the new face of Europe since May 1, 2004 with the Accession Treaty enlarging the European Union to 10 new countries. Obverse:the 12 flags of the initial countries along with 12 eurosuros marks. Reverse:the 10 new countries are syb
Napoleon's 1st bicentenary of coronation
Designer:		Mint: -	
Value: €10.00	Alloy: Gold 900/1000	Quantity: 5,000	Quality: Proof
Issued: 2004	Diameter: 21	Weight: 6.41	Market Value:
Front: The Laurel head of Napoleon and at the bottom, the crowning of Josephine de Beauharnais. Back: The NOTRE-DAME of Paris come to do the covert of Code Civil.

AVIGNON and the Palace of the Popes
Designer:		Mint: -	
Value: €20.00	Alloy: Gold 920/1000	Quantity: 1,000	Quality: Proof
Issued: 2004	Diameter: 31	Weight: 17	Market Value:
Front: Behind the Saint-Benezet Bridge, shines the most important gothic palace commemorated as a site of world patrimony of humanity. Back: Covering of the map of France.
Europa
Designer:		Mint: -	
Value: €20.00	Alloy: Gold 920/1000	Quantity: 3,000	Quality: Proof
Issued: 2004	Diameter: 31	Weight: 17	Market Value:
EUROPA 2004 : France announces the new face of Europe since May 1, 2004 with the Accession Treaty enlarging the European Union to 10 new countries. Obverse:the 12 flags of the initial countries along with 12 eurosuros marks. Reverse:the 10 new countries are syb
The Sower 2004
Designer:		Mint: -	
Value: €20.00	Alloy: Gold 920/1000	Quantity: 3,000	Quality: Proof
Issued: 2004	Diameter: 31	Weight: 17	Market Value:
Front :The Sower repeats his movement by spreading the seeds of French culture in the construction of Europe to spread the grain, `Euro¿ and also to say farewell. Back : Profile of a young woman reading the motto of the National Anthem.
Travelling around the world- Les Messageries Maritimes
Designer:		Mint: -	
Value: €20.00	Alloy: Gold 920/1000	Quantity: 1,000	Quality: Proof
Issued: 2004	Diameter: 31	Weight: 17	Market Value:
Front :Evoking the splendor of the « Compagnie with this magnificent ship heading towards the Far East. Back : A bouquet of roses under the motto, `liberty, equality, fraternity¿, value facing left
Travelling around the world-Les Grands Express Aériens
Designer:		Mint: -	
Value: €20.00	Alloy: Gold 920/1000	Quantity: 1,000	Quality: Proof
Issued: 2004	Diameter: 31	Weight: 17	Market Value:
Obverse: Evocation of the beginning of commercial aeronautics with this part devoted to the Company of Large the Express train Air. Reverse: A rose wind under the currency "Freedom-Equality-Fraternity", facial value on the left
Travelling around the world-The Croisiere Jaune
Designer:		Mint: -	
Value: €20.00	Alloy: Gold 920/1000	Quantity: 1,000	Quality: Proof
Issued: 2004	Diameter: 31	Weight: 17	Market Value:
Front: A heavy tank drives us from Beirut to Peking, evoking the fabulous 1930s adventures of the Crosiere Jaune. Back: A bounch of roses under the motto, `liberty, equality, fraternity¿, value facing left.
Travelling around the world-The Trans-Siberian
Designer:		Mint: -	
Value: €20.00	Alloy: Gold 920/1000	Quantity: 1,000	Quality: Proof
Issued: 2004	Diameter: 31	Weight: 17	Market Value:
Front: In 1905, it is possible to go from Paris to Moscow by rail, to reach Vladivostok thanks to the mythical Trans-Siberian Rail joining Europe and Asia. Back: A bunch *of roses under the motto, `liberty, equality, fraternity¿, value facing left.
BARTHOLDI Centenary of his death
Designer:		Mint: -	
Value: €20.00	Alloy: Gold 920/1000	Quantity: 320	Quality: Proof
Issued: 2004	Diameter: 31	Weight: 17	Market Value:
100th Anniversary of the death of the French sculptor is commemorated with the most limited edition of coins representing two of his best masterpieces. Front: Portrait of the artist in front of le Lion de Belfort. Back: Rendering of the Statue of Liberty.
Aladdin
Designer:		Mint: -	
Value: €20.00	Alloy: Gold 920/1000	Quantity: 316	Quality: Proof
Issued: 2004	Diameter: 31	Weight: 17	Market Value:
Aladdin One of the most marvellous tales from ¿A Thousand and One Nights¿, Aladdin, a teenager, finds in the magic lamp a genie that will help him find love, glory and wealth.
Peter Pan
Designer:		Mint: -	
Value: €20.00	Alloy: Gold 920/1000	Quantity: 362	Quality: Proof
Issued: 2004	Diameter: 21	Weight: 17	Market Value:
Peter Pan Hero of the tale written by Sir James. M.Barrie in 1902, Peter Pan is a child who does not want to grow up. He decides to leave his family and flies off for Neverland!

Napoleon's 1st bicentennial of coronation
Designer:		Mint: -	
Value: €50.00	Alloy: Gold 999/1000	Quantity: 3,000	Quality: Proof
Issued: 2004	Diameter: 37	Weight: 31.1	Market Value:
Front: The Laurel head of Napoleon and at the bottom, the crowning of Josephine de Beauharnais. Back: The NOTRE-DAME of Paris come to do the covert of Code Civil.

AVIGNON and the Palace of the Popes
Designer:		Mint: -	
Value: €1.50	Alloy: Silver 900/1000	Quantity: 10,000	Quality: Proof
Issued: 2004	Diameter: 37	Weight: 22.2	Market Value:
Front: Behind the Saint-Benezet Bridge, shines the most important gothic palace commemorated as a site of world patrimony of humanity. Back: Covering of the map of France.
Travelling around the world- Les Messageries Maritimes
Designer:		Mint: -	
Value: €1.50	Alloy: Silver 900/1000	Quantity: 10,000	Quality: Proof
Issued: 2004	Diameter: 37	Weight: 22.2	Market Value:
Front :Evoking the splendor of the « Compagnie des Messageries Maritimes with this magnificent ship heading towards the Far East
Travelling around the world-Les Grands Express Aériens
Designer:		Mint: -	
Value: €1.50	Alloy: Silver 900/1000	Quantity: 10,000	Quality: Proof
Issued: 2004	Diameter: 37	Weight: 22.2	Market Value:
Obverse: Evocation of the history beginner of commercial aeronautics with this part devoted to the Company of Large the Express train Air. Reverse: A pink of the winds under the currency "Freedom-Equality-Fraternity", facial value on the left
Travelling around the world-The Transsiberien
Designer:		Mint: -	
Value: €1.50	Alloy: Silver 900/1000	Quantity: 10,000	Quality: Proof
Issued: 2004	Diameter: 37	Weight: 22.2	Market Value:
Front: In 1905, it is possible to go from Paris to Moscow by rail to reach Vladivostok by way of the mythical Trans-Siberian Rail joining Europe and Asia. Back: A bouquet of roses under the motto, `liberty, equality, fraternity¿, value facing left.
Voyage autour du monde-Croisière Jaune
Designer:		Mint: -	
Value: €1.50	Alloy: Silver 900/1000	Quantity: 10,000	Quality: Proof
Issued: 2004	Diameter: 37	Weight: 22.2	Market Value:
Obverse : A half-track vehicle drives us from Beirut to Peking, evoking the fabulous 1930s adventures of the Crosiere Jaune.

Proof Euro set - 2004
Designer:		Mint: -	
Value: €5	Alloy: Silver	Quantity: 20,000	Quality: Proof
Issued: 2004	Diameter:	Weight: 500	Market Value:
The proof sets, presented in a luxury book case, include the coins 1 cent to 2 euros and the 5 euros in silver, in a limited edition of 20 000
