= Commemorative coins of France =

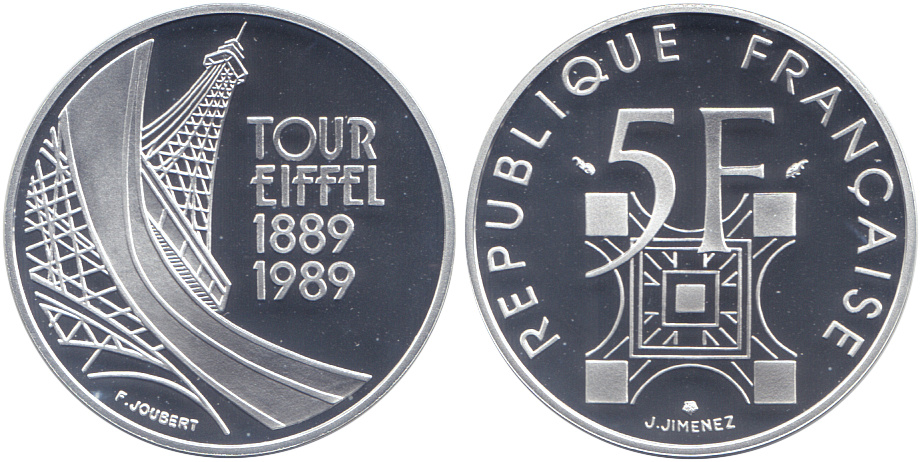
5 francs coin, issued for the 100th anniversary of the Eiffel Tower (1989, silver).

While many medals have been issued by the government of France over the centuries, legal tender commemorative coinage only began in 1982, with the issue of ten-franc piece commemorating Léon Gambetta. Soon there were other issues, and by the 1990s, there was a profusion of silver coins commemorating many events.

== Recent issues ==
- 1.50 euro - silver - Cinderella - 2002
- 1.50 euro - silver - Snow White - 2002
- 1.50 euro - silver - Alice in Wonderland - 2003
- 1.50 euro - silver - Hansel and Gretel - 2003
- 1.50 euro - silver - Aladdin - 2004
- 1.50 euro - silver - Peter Pan - 2004
- 1.50 euro - silver - 60th anniversary of D-Day - 2004
- 10 euro - gold - FIFA centennial - 2004
- 1.50 euro - silver - FIFA centennial - 2004
- 10 euro - gold - 150th anniversary of Bordeaux wines - 2005
- 1.50 euro - silver - 150th anniversary of Bordeaux Wines - 2005
- 1.50 euro - silver - 60th anniversary of World War II - 2005
- 10 euro - gold - Bicentenary of Austerlitz - 2005
- 1.50 - silver - Europa - 2005
- 1.50 euro - silver - Frédéric Chopin - 2005
- 20 euro - silver - Jules Verne/Twenty Thousand Leagues Under the Seas - 2005
- 0.25 euro - base metal - Jules Verne/Monde Fantastique - 2005
- 1.50 euro - silver - The Sower/Le Semeuse - 2005
- 20 euro - gold - 120th anniversary of the Statue of Liberty - 2004
- 100 euro - gold - 120th anniversary of the Statue of Liberty - 2004
- 1.50 euro - silver - 120th anniversary of the Statue of Liberty - 2004
- 1.50 euro - silver - Avignon and the Palaces of the Popes - 2004
- 10 euro - gold - Bicentennial of Napoleon's coronation - 2004?
- 0.25 euro - silver - Europa - 2003
- 10 euro - gold - Europa - 2004
- 1.50 euro - silver - FIFA centennial - 2004
- 20 euro - silver - Jules Verne/Around the World in Eighty Days - 2005
- 20 euro - gold - "Château de Chambord" - 2003
- 1.50 euro - silver - World Athletic Championships (WAC)/Jumping - 2003
- 1.50 euro - silver - WAC/Throwing - 2003
- 20 euro - gold - Paris-Tokyo flight - 2003
- 20 euro - gold - The Normandie - 2003
- 1.50 euro - silver - The Normandie - 2003
- 20 euro - gold - The Orient Express - 2003
- 1.50 euro - silver - Messageries Maritimes - 2004
- 1.50 euro - silver - The Grands Express Aériens - 2004
- 1.50 euro - silver - Yellow Cruise Half-Track - 2004
- 20 euro - gold - D-Day Anniversary - 2004
- 50 euro - gold - Hello Kitty/"Versailles Debut" - 2005
- 10 euro - gold - Hello Kitty/"Kitty Becomes an Opera Singer" - 2005
- 1.50 euro - silver - Hello Kitty/"Life In Paris" series of 3 - 2005
- 1.50 euro – silver - 100th Anniversary of the French Automobile Club 1st Grand Prix -
