= Banknotes of the Philippine peso =

New Generation Currency Series banknotes.

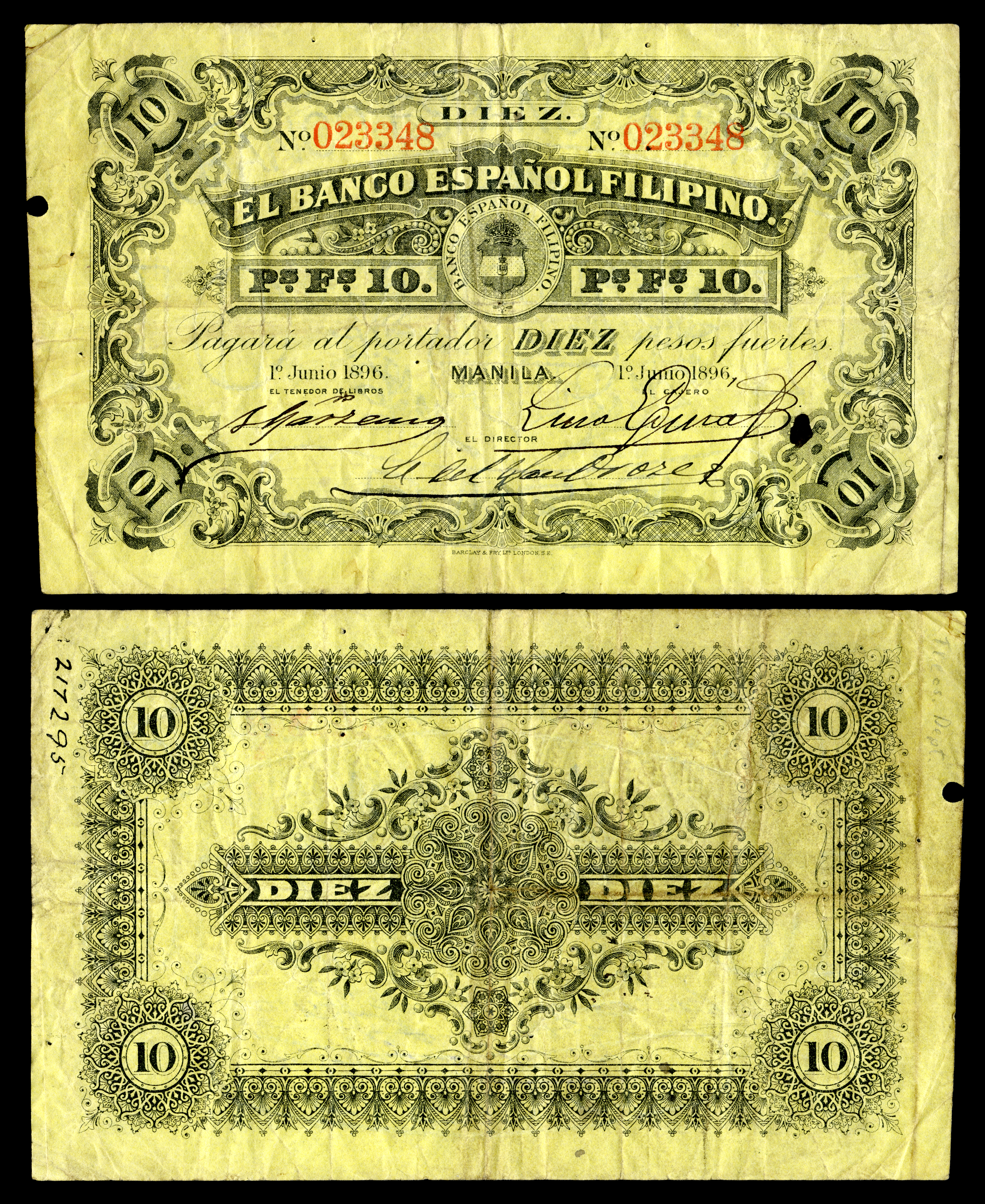
Early issue 1896 10 pesos note from El Banco Español-Filipino (1896).

Banknotes of the Philippine peso are issued by the Bangko Sentral ng Pilipinas (formerly the Central Bank of the Philippines) for circulation in the Philippines. The smallest denomination of banknote currently in circulation is ₱20 and the largest is ₱1000. The front side of each banknote features prominent people along with buildings and events from the country's history, while the reverse side depicts landmarks and animals.

The dimensions of banknotes issued since the US-Philippine administration, 16 cm × 6.6 cm (6.3 in × 2.6 in), have remained the same on all subsequent Philippine peso banknotes (except pre-1958 centavo notes), and were introduced during William Howard Taft's tenure as governor-general of the Philippines. In view of their highly successful run, President Taft then appointed a committee that reported favorably on the advantages and savings from changing the size of United States banknotes to Philippine-size. Since 1928, the sizes of the United States Federal Reserve Notes and Philippine banknotes have therefore been nearly identical.

== History ==
=== Timeline of the Philippine banknote series ===
On May 1, 1852, the first commercial bank of the Philippines, El Banco Español Filipino de Isabel II, initially issued the following denominations: 10, 25, 50 and 200 pesos fuertes (strong pesos). They were used until 1896.

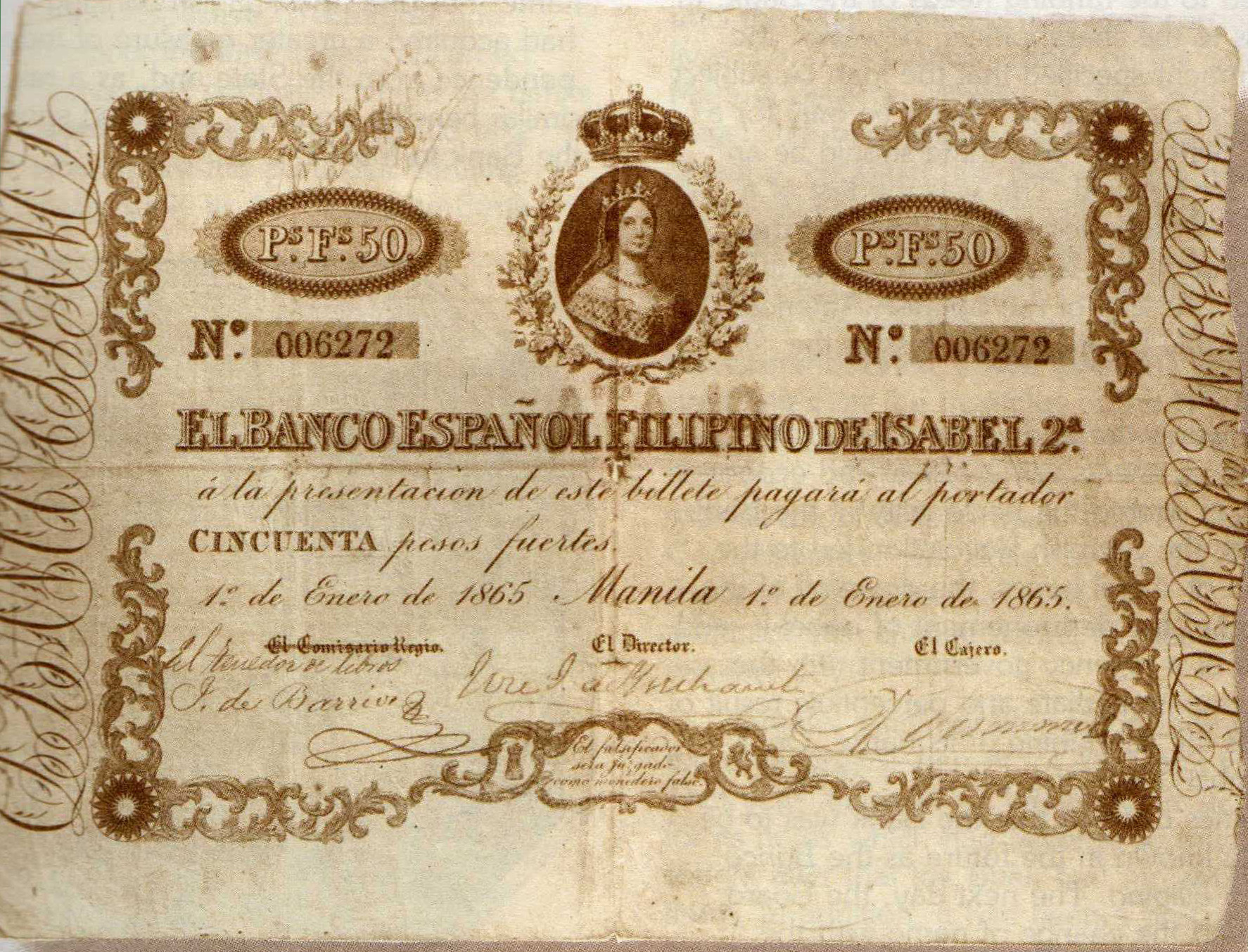
50 peso fuerte

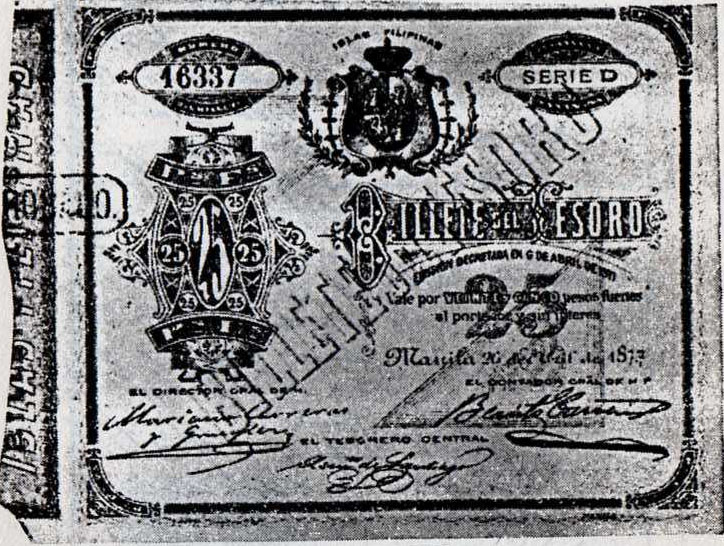
25 peso fuerte

=== First Philippine Republic ===
The revolutionary republic of Emilio Aguinaldo ordered the issuance of 1, 2, 5, 10, 20, 50 and 100-peso banknotes which were signed by Messrs. Pedro A. Paterno, Telesforo Chuidan and Mariano Limjap to avoid counterfeiting. However, only the 1 and 5-peso banknotes have been printed and circulated to some areas by the end of the short-lived First Republic.

=== American Period ===
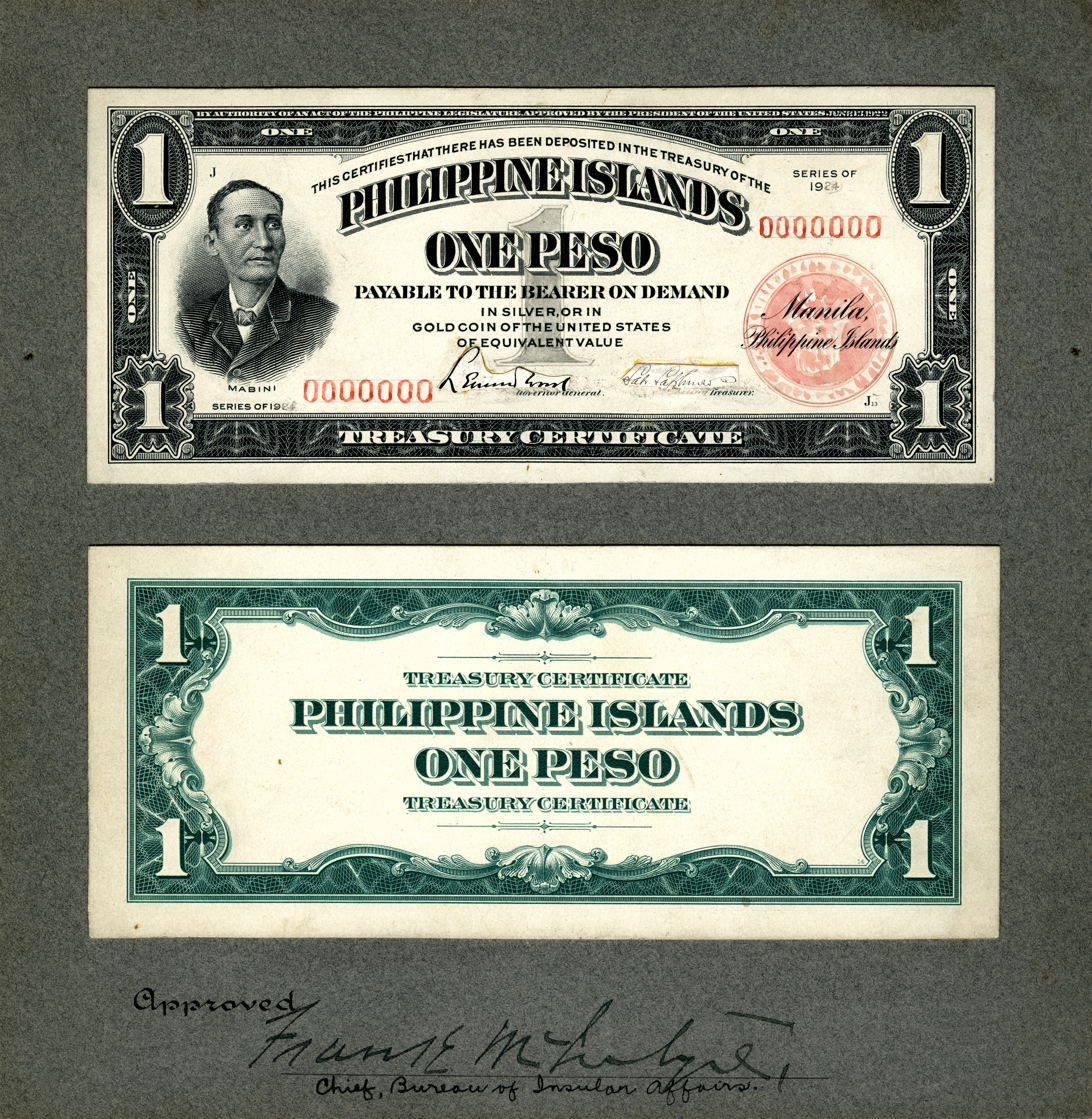
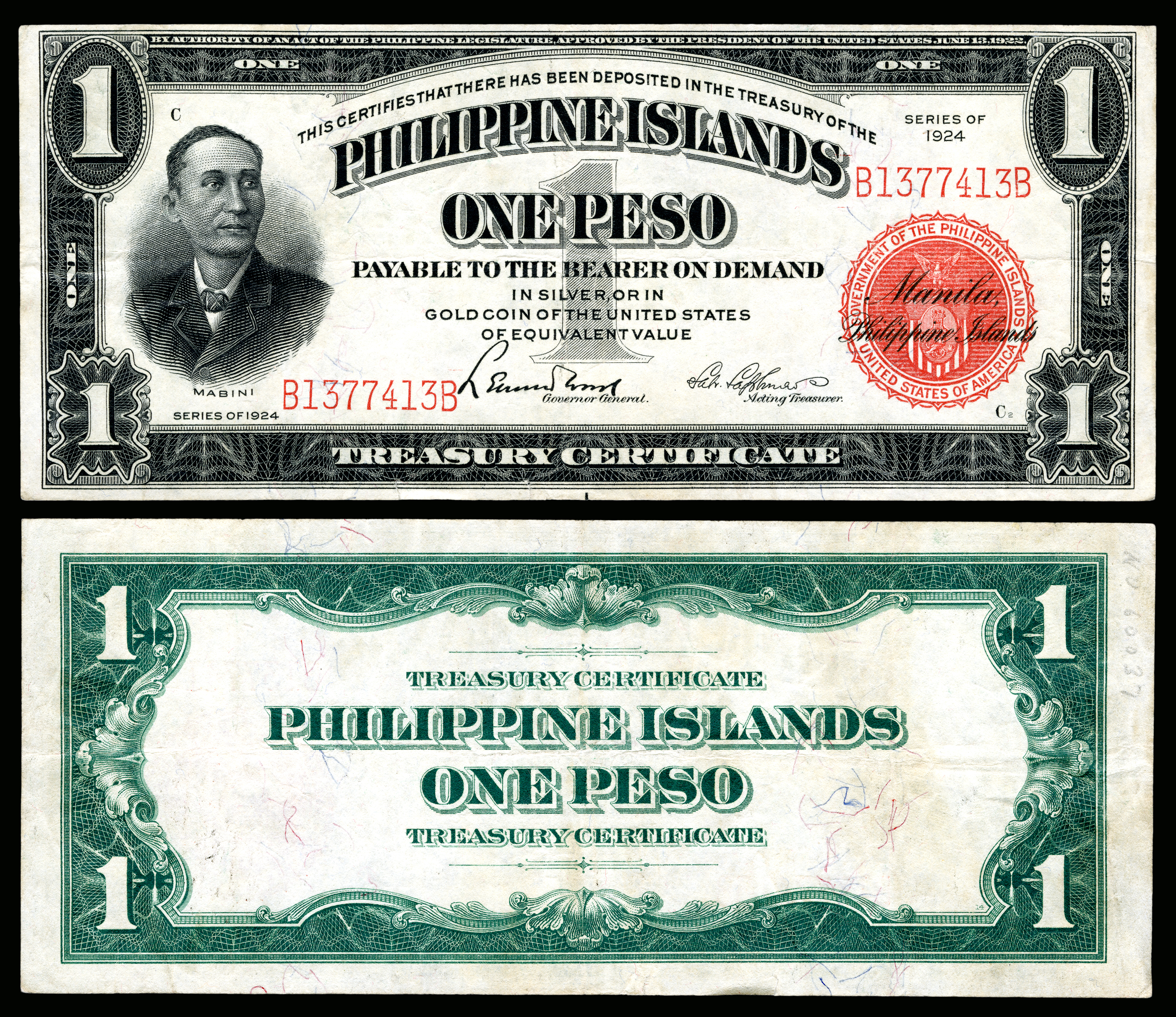
BEP design proof (top) and issued note (bottom) of the 1924 Philippine one peso. The BEP proof was approved by MG Frank McIntyre, Chief of the Bureau of Insular Affairs.

By 1903, the American colonial Insular Government had issued Silver Certificates in denominations of 2, 5 and 10 pesos, backed by silver pesos or U.S. dollars at a fixed rate of ₱2/$1. The authorization of the issuance of Philippine Silver Certificates were placed on the notes, "By Authority of an Act of the Congress of the United States of America, approved March 2, 1903." The first shipment of the currency was sent to the Philippines on September 1, 1903, and issued in October of the same year.

In 1905, higher denominations of 20, 50, 100 and 500 pesos were printed. However, amendments were made before the shipment of the notes from the United States to the Philippines to allow gold to be included as a reserve for the Silver Certificates. As the Series of 1905 was printed, but not yet shipped, they were sent to the United States Government Printing Office, and overprinted vertically with, "Subject to the provisions of the Act of Congress, approved June 23, 1906."

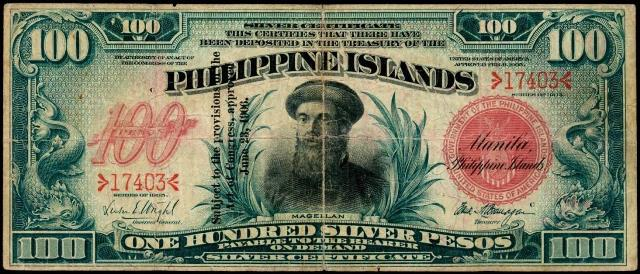
100 peso bill Silver Certificate (1905)

In 1908, the El Banco Español Filipino was allowed to print banknotes in the following denominations with text in Spanish: Cinco (5), Diez (10), Veinte (20), Cincuenta (50), Cien (100) and Dos Cientos (200) Pesos. In 1912, the bank was renamed Bank of the Philippine Islands (BPI) and henceforth issued the same banknotes in English.

In 1918, the Silver Certificates were replaced by the Treasury Certificates issued with government-backing of bonds issued by the United States Government in 1, 2, 5, 10, 20, 50, 100 and 500 pesos. In 1916, the Philippine National Bank (PNB) was created to administer the state-holding shares and print banknotes without any quota from the Philippine Assembly. They printed banknotes in denominations of 1, 2, 5, 10, 20, 50 and 100 pesos. During World War I, the PNB issued emergency notes printed on cardboard paper in the following denominations: 10, 20, 50 centavos and 1 peso. Also overprinted were BPI notes in 5, 10 and 20 pesos due to the lack of currency.

The Commonwealth of the Philippines issued Treasury Certificates with the seal of the new government but still circulated the BPI and PNB banknotes.

=== Japanese government-issued Philippine peso ===
==== 1942 series ====
Image	Value	Issue date	Series
	1 centavo	1942	First
	5 centavos	1942	First
	10 centavos	1942	First
	50 centavos	1942	First
	1 peso	1942	First
	5 pesos	1942	First
	10 pesos	1942	First

==== 1943–1945 series ====
Image	Value	Issue date	Series
	1 peso	1943	Second
	5 pesos	1943	Second
	10 pesos	1943	Second
	100 pesos	1944	Second
	500 pesos	1944	Second
	1,000 pesos	1945	Second

== Banknotes conceptualized and issued by the Bangko Sentral ng Pilipinas ==
=== Summary of the Philippine banknote series ===
Summary of the Philippine banknote series
Series/Value	₱1	₱2	₱5	₱10	₱20	₱50	₱100	₱200	₱500	₱1000
English Series	1 peso	2 pesos	5 pesos	10 pesos	20 pesos	50 pesos	100 pesos	200 pesos	500 pesos	not introduced until 1991
Pilipino Series	1 peso	—	5 pesos	10 pesos	20 pesos	50 pesos	100 pesos	withdrawn from production in 1959, and reintroduced in 2002^{9}	withdrawn from production in 1959, and scheduled to be reintroduced in 1985 but delayed two years later in 1987^{7}	not introduced until 1991
Ang Bagong Lipunan Series	ended production and replaced as coin since 1972	2 pesos	5 pesos	10 pesos	20 pesos	50 pesos	100 pesos	withdrawn from production in 1959, and reintroduced in 2002^{9}	withdrawn from production in 1959, and scheduled to be reintroduced in 1985 but delayed two years later in 1987^{7}	not introduced until 1991
New Design/BSP Series	ended production and replaced as coin since 1972	ended production and replaced as coin from 1983 to 1994	5 pesos	10 pesos	20 pesos	50 pesos	100 pesos	200 pesos	500 pesos	1000 pesos
New Generation Currency Series	ended production and replaced as coin since 1972	ended production and replaced as coin from 1983 to 1994	ended production and replaced as coin since 1995^{8}	ended production and replaced as coin since 2001	20 pesos obverse (2017 edition)	50 pesos obverse	100 pesos obverse (2010 edition) 100 pesos obverse (stronger mauve color)	200 pesos obverse (2010 edition)	500 pesos obverse	1000 pesos obverse (2012 edition)
Enhanced New Generation Currency Series	ended production and replaced as coin since 1972	ended production and replaced as coin from 1983 to 1994	ended production and replaced as coin since 1995^{8}	ended production and replaced as coin since 2001	ended production and replaced as coin since 2023	with: —1 pair of short lines	with: —2 pairs of short lines —violet modified^{1} WST^{2}	with: —3 pairs of short lines —green modified WST	with: —4 pairs of short lines —gold modified WST —gold OVM^{3} ink —gold optically variable ink^{4}	with: —5 pairs of short lines —blue 5mm DST^{5} —green OVM ink —green modified^{6} OVI
First Philippine Polymer Series	ended production and replaced as coin since 1972	ended production and replaced as coin from 1983 to 1994	ended production and replaced as coin since 1995^{8}	ended production and replaced as coin since 2001	ended production and replaced as coin since 2023			ended production since 2020		

Notes

1. windowed security thread with indigenous weave design pattern
2. WST - windowed security thread
3. OVM - optically variable magnetic
4. replacing optically variable device (OVD) patch
5. DST - dynamic security thread
6. shifts from green to magenta (in 2010 OVI, it was shifts from green to blue)
7. the denomination was scheduled to be reintroduced in 1985 with the original 1985–1986 Marcos Sr. version which already printed 2 million banknotes but it did not went into circulation due to EDSA 1, delaying the denomination's release to 1987 in order for it to be replaced by the second (Aquino Jr.) version that finally circulated to the public from 1987 to 2018
8. originally introduced in 1975. However, for the 5-piso banknote, it had its (together with the 10-piso banknote that stopped printing in 2001) spiritual successor as the 200-piso from 2002 to 2020 due to its green color, and Aguinaldo Shrine and Barasoain Church (from 2010 to 2020) were featured
9. it was intended as the "direct" replacement in 2002 for the unissued 2000-piso "New Millennium" banknote (smaller version of the 1998 Centennial) that was scheduled to be circulated for general circulation in 2001 but halted as the result of EDSA 2, and also the spiritual successor to the 5-piso and later with the Barasaoin Church from the 10-piso banknote from 2010 to 2020

=== "VICTORY-CBP" banknotes ===
The banknotes first issued by the Bangko Sentral ng Pilipinas (formerly the "Central Bank of the Philippines") were the VICTORY-CBP overprints in 1949, which were merely overprints of older American-era banknotes. The first official banknote series to be printed were the English Series in 1951.

"VICTORY-CBP" banknotes
Image		Value	Dimensions	Main Color	Description		Date	
Obverse	Reverse	Value	Dimensions	Main Color	Obverse	Reverse	First issue	Withdrawal
		1 peso	160 mm × 66 mm (6.3 in × 2.6 in)	Maroon	Apolinario Mabini	"VICTORY", "CENTRAL BANK OF THE PHILIPPINES", value	before 1949	
		2 pesos	160 mm × 66 mm (6.3 in × 2.6 in)	Blue	José Rizal	"VICTORY", "CENTRAL BANK OF THE PHILIPPINES", value	before 1949	
		5 pesos	160 mm × 66 mm (6.3 in × 2.6 in)	Yellow	William McKinley and George Dewey	"VICTORY", "CENTRAL BANK OF THE PHILIPPINES", value	before 1949	
		10 pesos	160 mm × 66 mm (6.3 in × 2.6 in)	Brown	George Washington	"VICTORY", "CENTRAL BANK OF THE PHILIPPINES", value	before 1949	
		20 pesos	160 mm × 66 mm (6.3 in × 2.6 in)	Orange	Mayon volcano	"VICTORY", "CENTRAL BANK OF THE PHILIPPINES", value	before 1949	
		50 pesos	160 mm × 66 mm (6.3 in × 2.6 in)	Pink	Henry Ware Lawton	"VICTORY", "CENTRAL BANK OF THE PHILIPPINES", value	before 1949	
		100 pesos	160 mm × 66 mm (6.3 in × 2.6 in)	#eedba3	Ferdinand Magellan	"VICTORY", "CENTRAL BANK OF THE PHILIPPINES", value	before 1949	
		500 pesos	160 mm × 66 mm (6.3 in × 2.6 in)	Violet	Miguel López de Legazpi	"VICTORY", "CENTRAL BANK OF THE PHILIPPINES", value	before 1949	
For table standards, see the banknote specification table.

=== English Series (1949–1971) ===
The English Series were Philippine banknotes that circulated from 1949 to 1969. It was the only banknote series of the Philippine peso to use English.

English Series
Image		Value	Dimensions	Main Color	Description		Date	
Obverse	Reverse	Value	Dimensions	Main Color	Obverse	Reverse	First issue	Withdrawal
Small denomination notes
5 centavos	5 centavos	5 centavos		Red	Bank title, bank seal, value, serial number	"PHILIPPINES", value	April 15, 1951	June 30, 1958
10 centavos	10 centavos	10 centavos		Maroon	Bank title, bank seal, value, serial number	"PHILIPPINES", value	April 15, 1951	June 30, 1958
20 centavos	20 centavos	20 centavos		Green	Bank title, bank seal, value, serial number	"PHILIPPINES", value	April 15, 1951	June 30, 1958
		50 centavos		Blue	Bank title, bank seal, value, serial number	"PHILIPPINES", value	April 15, 1951	June 30, 1958
		1/2 peso		Green	Mt. Mayon and three men riding on a carabao-drawn cart	"PHILIPPINES", value	July 1, 1958	February 28, 1969
Large denomination notes
1 pesos	1 pesos	₱1	160 mm × 66 mm (6.3 in × 2.6 in)	Gray	Apolinario Mabini	Barasoain Church	April 15, 1951	March 31, 1971
2 pesos		₱2	160 mm × 66 mm (6.3 in × 2.6 in)	Blue	José Rizal	Landing of Magellan in the Philippines	April 15, 1951	March 31, 1971
5 pesos		₱5	160 mm × 66 mm (6.3 in × 2.6 in)	Yellow	Marcelo H. del Pilar and Graciano Lopez Jaena	La Solidaridad	April 15, 1951	March 31, 1971
10 pesos		₱10	160 mm × 66 mm (6.3 in × 2.6 in)	Brown	Fathers Mariano Gomez, Jose Burgos and Jacinto Zamora	Urdaneta and Legazpi Monument	April 15, 1951	March 31, 1971
20 pesos		₱20	160 mm × 66 mm (6.3 in × 2.6 in)	Orange	Andres Bonifacio and Emilio Jacinto	Cartilla of the Katipunan and the Balintawak Monument	April 15, 1951	March 31, 1971
50 pesos		₱50	160 mm × 66 mm (6.3 in × 2.6 in)	Red	Antonio Luna	Blood compact between Sikatuna and Legaspi	April 15, 1951	March 31, 1971
100 pesos		₱100	160 mm × 66 mm (6.3 in × 2.6 in)	Yellow	Tandang Sora	Regimental flags and the veterans	April 15, 1951	March 31, 1971
200 pesos		₱200	160 mm × 66 mm (6.3 in × 2.6 in)	Green	Manuel L. Quezon	Legislative Building	April 15, 1951	December 31, 1959
500 pesos	500 pesos	₱500	160 mm × 66 mm (6.3 in × 2.6 in)	Violet	Manuel Roxas	Former Central Bank Building	April 15, 1951	December 31, 1959
For table standards, see the banknote specification table.

=== Pilipino Series (1969–1974) ===
The Pilipino Series banknotes is the name used to refer to Philippine banknotes issued by the Central Bank of the Philippines from 1969 to 1977, during the term of President Ferdinand Marcos Sr. This series represented a radical change from the English series by undergoing Filipinization and a design change. It was succeeded by the Ang Bagong Lipunan Series of banknotes, to which it shared a similar design. The lowest denomination of the series is 1-piso and the highest is 100-piso.

Pilipino Series
Image		Value	Dimensions	Main Color	Description		Date	
Obverse	Reverse	Value	Dimensions	Main Color	Obverse	Reverse	First issue	Withdrawal
1 pesos	1 pesos	₱1	160 mm × 66 mm (6.3 in × 2.6 in)	Blue	José Rizal	Declaration of Philippine Independence	May 5, 1969	March 1, 1974
5 pesos		₱5	160 mm × 66 mm (6.3 in × 2.6 in)	Green	Andres Bonifacio	Blood Compact of the Katipuneros	May 5, 1969	March 1, 1974
10 pesos		₱10	160 mm × 66 mm (6.3 in × 2.6 in)	Brown	Apolinario Mabini	Barasoain Church	May 5, 1969	March 1, 1974
20 pesos		₱20	160 mm × 66 mm (6.3 in × 2.6 in)	Orange	Manuel L. Quezon	Malacañang Palace	May 5, 1969	March 1, 1974
50 pesos		₱50	160 mm × 66 mm (6.3 in × 2.6 in)	Red	Sergio Osmeña	Legislative Building	May 5, 1969	March 1, 1974
100 pesos	100 pesos	₱100	160 mm × 66 mm (6.3 in × 2.6 in)	Violet	Manuel Roxas	Former Bangko Sentral ng Pilipinas Building	May 5, 1969	March 1, 1974
For table standards, see the banknote specification table.

=== Ang Bagong Lipunan Series (1973–1996) ===
The Ang Bagong Lipunan Series (literally, ”The New Society Series") is the name used to refer to Philippine banknotes issued by the Central Bank of the Philippines from 1973 to 1985. It was succeeded by the New Design Series of banknotes. The lowest denomination of the series is 2-piso and the highest is 100-piso.

After the declaration of Proclamation № 1081 by President Ferdinand Marcos Sr. on September 23, 1972, the Central Bank was to demonetize the English Series banknotes in 1974, pursuant to Presidential Decree No. 168, later amended by Presidential Decree 378. All the unissued Pilipino Series banknotes (except the one peso banknote) were sent back to the De La Rue plant in London for overprinting the watermark area with the words "ANG BAGONG LIPUNAN" and oval geometric safety design. The one peso bill was replaced with the two peso bill, which features the same elements of the demonetized Pilipino series one peso bill.

On September 7, 1978, the Security Printing Plant in Quezon City was inaugurated to produce the banknotes.

The banknotes were still legal tender even after the introduction of the New Design Series banknotes, however they were seldom used after the People Power Revolution. The banknotes were eventually demonetized on February 2, 1993 (but could still be exchanged with legal tender currency to the Central Bank until February 1, 1996) after clamors that the banknotes could be used to buy votes for the 1992 Presidential Elections.

Ang Bagong Lipunan (New Society) Series
Image		Value	Dimensions	Main Color	Description		Date	
Obverse	Reverse	Value	Dimensions	Main Color	Obverse	Reverse	First issue	Withdrawal
2 pesos	2 pesos	₱2	160 mm × 66 mm (6.3 in × 2.6 in)	Blue	José Rizal	Declaration of Philippine Independence	March 17, 1973	February 2, 1996
5 pesos		₱5	160 mm × 66 mm (6.3 in × 2.6 in)	Green	Andres Bonifacio	Blood Compact of the Katipuneros	March 17, 1973	February 2, 1996
10 pesos	10 pesos	₱10	160 mm × 66 mm (6.3 in × 2.6 in)	Brown	Apolinario Mabini	Barasoain Church	March 17, 1973	February 2, 1996
20 pesos	20 pesos	₱20	160 mm × 66 mm (6.3 in × 2.6 in)	Orange	Manuel L. Quezon	Malacañang Palace	March 17, 1973	February 2, 1996
50 pesos	50 pesos	₱50	160 mm × 66 mm (6.3 in × 2.6 in)	Red	Sergio Osmeña	Legislative Building	March 17, 1973	February 2, 1996
100 pesos	100 pesos	₱100	160 mm × 66 mm (6.3 in × 2.6 in)	Violet	Manuel Roxas	BSP Complex	March 17, 1973	February 2, 1996
For table standards, see the banknote specification table.

=== New Design/BSP Series (1983–2019, printed from 1985 to 2013) ===
By 1983, the committee had decided on the issuance of new banknotes to replace the Ang Bagong Lipunan Series by issuing seven new banknotes consisting in denominations of 5, 10, 20, 50, 100, 500 and 1000-pesos.

On June 12, 1985, BSP issued the New Design Series starting with a 5-peso banknote with the face of Emilio Aguinaldo. A new 10-peso banknote with the face of Apolinario Mabini was then introduced in July 1985, a month after the 5-peso banknote was issued. In January 1986, a new 20-peso banknote was introduced.

Following the Philippines' new Constitution coming into effect in 1987, the 50 and 100-peso banknotes, featuring Sergio Osmeña and Manuel Roxas, were introduced on April of the said year. Before the second circulated version of 500-peso banknote with Ninoy Aquino, the first unreleased version was slated to feature Marcos which were already printed with 2 million banknotes as initial batch but the People Power Revolution caused it to be replaced by the former and also delayed the denomination's release to August 21, 1987. On December 7, 1991, the BSP issued a 1000-peso banknote, for the first time. It contained composite portraits of Jose Abad Santos, Josefa Llanes Escoda, and Vicente Lim, considered to be World War II heroes.

After the passage of the New Central Bank Act of 1993 when the Bangko Sentral ng Pilipinas (BSP) was reestablished as the central monetary authority, the series was renamed the BSP Series and featured the new seal of the BSP.

The 5- and 10-peso banknotes stopped production in June 1995 and July 2001, respectively, due to wear and tear caused by widespread usage. They were replaced by coin versions, though the banknotes remained the liability of the BSP until January 3, 2018. On May 2, 1997, the portrait of Andrés Bonifacio was added beside Apolinario Mabini on the 10-peso banknote. Elements of Katipunan were also included on the right side of the bill. The reverse design was likewise revised. The scene depicting the Katipuneros' blood compact, previously featured on the 5-peso banknote in the Pilipino and Ang Bagong Lipunan series, was added to the right side of the Barasoain Church. However, the watermark area continued to feature only Mabini, and the embedded security thread remained on the right side of the BSP governor's signature until 1998. As a result, banknotes with Bonifacio's image issued between 1997 and 1998 used the same paper originally intended for the 1985 version, which featured only Mabini.

On May 2, 1997, the year of issue or printing was introduced on banknotes starting with the release of the 10-peso note with Andres Bonifacio and the Blood Compact of the Katipuneros. This feature was later adapted on other banknotes of the series which are 20, 50, 100, 500, and 1,000 peso notes starting with those printed in 1998 therefore the said denominations without a year mark were produced from 1986 to 1997. The only banknote of the series that does not use the printing or issue year is the 5-peso note as it stopped being printed in 1995 two years before the printing year was introduced or added on banknotes.

In 1998, the 100,000-peso Centennial banknote, measuring 8.5"x14", was accredited by the Guinness Book of World Records as the world's largest legal tender note. It was issued in very limited quantity during the celebration of the Centennial of Philippine Independence. In the same year, the practice in banknotes since the Commonwealth era of reproducing the signature of the President of the Philippines over the legend "President of the Philippines" was abandoned in favor of explicitly stating the president's name. Also, the names of the Philippine president and BSP governor were capitalized, while their titles were now in lowercase.

In 2001, the BSP upgraded the security features (visible fibers, value panel, security thread and watermark) of the 100, 500, and 1000-peso banknotes with additional security features like a second glossy security thread, iridescent strip, fluorescent printing, optically variable ink, and microprints. In 2002, the Bangko Sentral issued a new 200-peso banknote with the same aforementioned security features and with the face of former President Diosdado Macapagal. His daughter, Gloria Macapagal Arroyo, was at the back of the 200-peso banknote which showed her being sworn into office at the EDSA Shrine. She is the first president whose image has been included in a banknote while in office since emergency currency was issued by various provincial currency boards during World War II.

On July 8, 2009, the BSP announced that it would recall all bank notes made of abaca and cotton and replace it with an all-polymer series. This plan was delayed for 12 years until 2021, however, when the New Generation Currency series began printing in November 2010, with all banknotes still made of abaca and cotton.

The series had the liability of the BSP alongside the New Generation Currency series until the demonetization of the 2,000 and 100,000-piso commemorative banknotes on August 2, 2019, when the New Generation Currency series became a single circulating set, making the New Design Series the banknote series to have the longest liability (34 years) of the BSP, with main banknotes demonetized on January 3, 2018, and the said commemorative banknotes and series overall in August 2019.

Signature pairs of the President of the Philippines and Governor of the Bangko Sentral ng Pilipinas appearing on the banknotes:

- 1983–1984: Ferdinand Marcos Sr., Jaime C. Laya (concept during production)
- 1984–1986: Ferdinand Marcos Sr., Jose B. Fernandez Jr. (concept (1984–1985); release: 5 and 10 (1985–1986), and 20 (1986))
- 1986–1990: Corazon Aquino, Jose B. Fernandez Jr. (5, 10 and 20 (1986–1990), and 50, 100 and 500 (1987–1990))
- 1990–1992: Corazon Aquino, Jose L. Cuisia Jr. (5, 10, 20, 50, 100 and 500 (1990–1992), and 1,000 (1991–1992))
- 1992–1993: Fidel V. Ramos, Jose L. Cuisia Jr.
- 1993–1998: Fidel V. Ramos, Gabriel Singson (5 (1993–1995), 10, 20, 50, 100, 500 and 1,000 (1993–1998), and 100,000 (1998))
- 1998–1999: Joseph Estrada, Gabriel Singson (2,000 (1998), and 10, 20, 50, 100, 500 and 1,000 (1998–1999))
- 1999–2001: Joseph Estrada, Rafael Buenaventura (1,000 (1999–2000), 10, 20, 50, 100 and 500 (1999–2001), and 2,000 (2001; unreleased))
- 2001–2005: Gloria Macapagal Arroyo, Rafael Buenaventura (10 (2001), 50, 100, and 1,000 (2001–2004), 200 (2002–2004), and 20 and 500 (2001–2005))
- 2005–2010: Gloria Macapagal Arroyo, Amando Tetangco Jr.
- 2010–2013: Benigno Aquino III, Amando Tetangco Jr. (20 and 1,000 (2010–2012), and 50, 100, 200, and 500 (2010–2013))

New Design/BSP Series
Image		Value	Dimensions	Main Color	Design		Date	
Obverse	Reverse	Value	Dimensions	Main Color	Obverse	Reverse	First Issue	Withdrawal
		₱5	160 mm × 66 mm (6.3 in × 2.6 in)	Green and Brown	Emilio Aguinaldo, First Philippine Republic historical marker in Malolos Cathedral, cannon	Declaration of Philippine Independence, June 12, 1898	June 12, 1985	January 3, 2018
		₱10	160 mm × 66 mm (6.3 in × 2.6 in)	Brown, Teal, and Orange	Apolinario Mabini, Mabini's True Decalogue (El Decalogo Verdadero), quill and inkwell	Barasoain Church	July 1985	January 3, 2018
		₱10	160 mm × 66 mm (6.3 in × 2.6 in)	Brown and Teal	Apolinario Mabini, Andres Bonifacio, Mabini's True Decalogue (El Decalogo Verdadero), quill and inkwell, Kartilya ng Katipunan, Katipunan flag	Barasoain Church, Blood Compact of the Katipuneros	May 2, 1997	January 3, 2018
		₱20	160 mm × 66 mm (6.3 in × 2.6 in)	Orange and Blue	Manuel L. Quezon, Commonwealth of the Philippines coat-of-arms, 1935 Philippine Constitution, Filipino as the National Language	Malacañang Palace	January 1986	January 3, 2018
		₱50	160 mm × 66 mm (6.3 in × 2.6 in)	Red and Violet	Sergio Osmeña, Fuente Osmeña fountain in Cebu, gavel	National Museum (formerly Legislative Building)	April 18, 1987	January 3, 2018
		₱100	160 mm × 66 mm (6.3 in × 2.6 in)	Violet	Manuel A. Roxas, Inauguration of the Third Philippine Republic, July 4, 1946	Old and current headquarters of the Bangko Sentral ng Pilipinas in Manila	April 18, 1987	January 3, 2018
		₱200	160 mm × 66 mm (6.3 in × 2.6 in)	Green and Violet	Diosdado P. Macapagal, Aguinaldo Shrine in Kawit, Cavite	EDSA People Power 2001 and the inauguration of President Gloria Macapagal Arroyo	June 12, 2002	January 3, 2018
		₱500	160 mm × 66 mm (6.3 in × 2.6 in)	Yellow, Brown, Blue, Grey, and Black	Benigno S. Aquino Jr., BSAJ typewriter, His quotations of The Filipino is worth dying for and his signature Ninoy	Aquino as a journalist for the Manila Times holding a Rolleiflex camera (in front of an article about "1st Cav" and the Partition of Korea), Study Now, Pay Later education program, Concepcion, Tarlac town hall, Tarlac Provincial Capitol, 1986 People Power Revolution.	August 21, 1987	January 3, 2018
		₱1000	160 mm × 66 mm (6.3 in × 2.6 in)	Blue	José Abad Santos, Vicente Lim, Josefa Llanes Escoda, eternal flame at the Libingan ng mga Bayani, laurel wreath	Banaue Rice Terraces, Manunggul Jar cover and Langgal hut.	December 7, 1991	January 3, 2018
For table standards, see the banknote specification table.

=== New Generation Currency Series (2007–present, printed since 2010 (current)) ===
Bangko Sentral ng Pilipinas (BSP) began the 12-year demonetization process of the New Design Series when the New Generation Currency (NGC) project was started in 2007 through a formal conceptualization process. The series began printing in November 2010 for the particular original batch's subsequent release to general public on December 16, 2010, three years after the project was started. It was approved by Presidents Gloria Macapagal Arroyo and her immediate successor Benigno Aquino III, making the only banknote series to be approved by two presidents.

The members of the numismatic committee included Bangko Sentral Deputy Governor Diwa Guinigundo and Dr. Ambeth Ocampo, chairman of the National Historical Institute. Designed by Studio 5 Designs and Design Systemat, the new banknotes' designs feature famous Filipinos and iconic natural landmarks. Former President Corazon Aquino was added to the 500-peso bill together with her husband Senator Benigno Aquino Jr. The word "Pilipino" is rendered on the reverse and on the front in Baybayin (ᜉᜒᜎᜒᜉᜒᜈᜓ) as a see-through register, which is a security feature where if you hold up the note against the light, an image will form, in this case, it's a word that will form. The font used for lettering in the banknotes is Myriad, while the numerals are set in the Twentieth Century font.

The New Generation Currency series is the only circulating set of notes since August 2, 2019. In 2017, the BSP updated the design of the NGC series banknotes with the following changes:

- Enlarged the font size of the year of issue (all banknotes)
- Italicized the scientific names on the reverse (all banknotes)
- Replaced the images of the Aguinaldo Shrine and the Barasoain Church on the obverse side of the ₱200 banknote with scenes of the Philippine Declaration of Independence and the opening of the Malolos Congress respectively.
- The text "October 1944" was added after the word "Leyte Landing" at the obverse of the ₱50 banknote
- The Order of Lakandula Medal and the phrase “Medal of Honor” were removed on the obverse side of the ₱1000 banknote

In 2020, the Enhanced NGC series all banknotes except for the ₱20 were updated with the following changes:

- The addition of intaglio tactile markings for the visually impaired in the form of horizontal bands (all banknotes)
- The addition of an improved windowed security thread for the ₱100, ₱200, ₱500, and ₱1000 banknotes featuring indigenous weaving patterns.
- For the ₱1000 note the thread size was increased to 5 millimetres (0.20 in), with the rest remaining the same.
- For the ₱500 and ₱1000 notes, the denomination value was embossed with optically variable ink wherein the color changes if the banknote is tilted.
- A stylized Philippine flag has also been added with optically variable ink on the ₱500 note replacing optically variable device patch.
- The concealed values are more reflective (all banknotes).
- For the ₱500 and ₱1000 notes, the denomination at the left has color-shifting ink.

On December 7, 2022, the 2020 BSP logo is now used on 20, 50, 100, 500, and 1,000-peso (non-polymer version) bills which replaced the 2010 logo that has been in use since March 2010 upon the announcement of the series' imminent start of print run and resulting release to the public from November to December 2010 where its early design closer to final was previewed and also released the banknotes bearing the signatures of President Ferdinand Marcos Jr. and BSP Governor Felipe Medalla.

Signature pairs of the President of the Philippines and Governor of the Bangko Sentral ng Pilipinas appearing on the banknotes:

- 2010: Gloria Macapagal Arroyo, Amando Tetangco Jr. (concept during production)
- 2010–2016: Benigno Aquino III, Amando Tetangco Jr.
- 2016–2017: Rodrigo Duterte, Amando Tetangco Jr.
- 2017–2019: Rodrigo Duterte, Nestor Espenilla Jr.
- 2019–2022: Rodrigo Duterte, Benjamin Diokno
- 2022–2023: Ferdinand Marcos Jr., Felipe Medalla
- 2024–present: Ferdinand Marcos Jr., Eli Remolona

New Generation Currency series (2010 original)
Image		Value	Dimensions	Main Color	Design		Date of first issue	Usage in circulation
Obverse	Reverse	Value	Dimensions	Main Color	Obverse	Reverse	Date of first issue	Usage in circulation
		₱20	160 mm × 66 mm (6.3 in × 2.6 in)	Orange	Manuel L. Quezon, Declaration of Filipino as the national language, Malacañang Palace	Banaue Rice Terraces; Paradoxurus hermaphroditus (Asian palm civet); Cordilleras weave design	November 2010	Wide
		₱50	160 mm × 66 mm (6.3 in × 2.6 in)	Red	Sergio Osmeña, First Philippine Assembly, Leyte Landing	Taal Lake in Batangas; Caranx ignobilis, (maliputo, giant trevally); Batangas embroidery design	November 2010	Wide
		₱100	160 mm × 66 mm (6.3 in × 2.6 in)	Violet	Manuel A. Roxas, Old Bangko Sentral ng Pilipinas (BSP) building in Intramuros, Manila, Inauguration of the Third Philippine Republic	Mayon Volcano in Albay; Rhincodon typus (whale shark, butanding); Bicol textile design	November 2010	Limited
		₱100	160 mm × 66 mm (6.3 in × 2.6 in)	Violet (mauve)	Manuel A. Roxas, Old Bangko Sentral ng Pilipinas (BSP) building in Intramuros, Manila, Inauguration of the Third Philippine Republic, stronger mauve color than previous banknote	Mayon Volcano in Albay; Rhincodon typus (whale shark, butanding); Bicol textile design	April 11, 2015	Wide
		₱200	160 mm × 66 mm (6.3 in × 2.6 in)	Green	Diosdado P. Macapagal, EDSA People Power 2001, Aguinaldo Shrine in Kawit, Cavite, Barasoain Church in Malolos, Bulacan	Chocolate Hills in Bohol; Tarsius syrichta (Philippine tarsier); Visayas weave design	November 2010	Limited
		₱200	160 mm × 66 mm (6.3 in × 2.6 in)	Green	Diosdado P. Macapagal, EDSA People Power 2001, Declaration of Philippine Independence in Kawit, Cavite, Opening of the Malolos Congress in Barasoain Church, Malolos, Bulacan	Chocolate Hills in Bohol; Tarsius syrichta (Philippine tarsier); Visayas weave design	December 5, 2017	Wide
		₱500	160 mm × 66 mm (6.3 in × 2.6 in)	Yellow	Corazon C. Aquino, Benigno S. Aquino Jr., EDSA People Power I, Benigno Aquino monument in Makati	Subterranean Underground River in Puerto Princesa, Palawan; Tanygnathus lucionensis (blue-naped parrot); Southern Philippines cloth design	November 2010	Wide
		₱1000	160 mm × 66 mm (6.3 in × 2.6 in)	Blue	José Abad Santos, Vicente Lim, Josefa Llanes Escoda; Centennial celebration of Philippine independence; Philippine Medal of Honor	Tubbataha Reefs Natural Park in Sulu Sea; Pinctada maxima (South Sea pearl); Mindanao design for T'nalak (Ikat-dyed abaca)	November 2010	Limited
		₱1000	160 mm × 66 mm (6.3 in × 2.6 in)	Blue	José Abad Santos, Vicente Lim, Josefa Llanes Escoda; Centennial celebration of Philippine independence	Tubbataha Reefs Natural Park in Sulu Sea; Pinctada maxima (South Sea pearl); Mindanao design for T'nalak (Ikat-dyed abaca)	December 5, 2017	Wide
For table standards, see the banknote specification table.

==== Errors ====
Several errors have been discovered on banknotes of the New Generation series and have become the subject of ridicule on social networking sites. Among these are the exclusion of Batanes from the Philippine map on the reverse of all denominations, the mislocation of the Puerto Princesa Subterranean Underground River on the reverse of the 500-peso bill and the Tubbataha Reef on the 1000-peso bill, and the incorrect coloring on the beak and feathers of the blue-naped parrot on the 500-peso bill. The scientific names of the animals featured on the reverse sides of all banknotes were incorrectly rendered as well.

According to Design Systemat, the designers of the new bills, that drafts prepared by the company of the new 500-peso bill shows a red beak of the blue-naped parrot. This color was changed by the printers to account for practical printing concerns. The designers further explain that printing banknotes is not like printing brochures. Due to the intaglio printing and limited printing capability of banknote printers, it can only produce a limited full color reproduction.

The alleged mislocation of the Tubbataha Reef on the one thousand peso note was due to a security feature, a smaller version of the featured species on the bills' reverse (which is also featured on all banknote denominations) was located on top of the exact location of the Tubbataha Reef on the map. Giving the option of either moving the key security feature on the standard position or locating the Tubbataha marker correctly, the bills' French printers, Oberthur Technologies, decided to move the reef marker slightly south on the Philippine map.

=== First Philippine Polymer Banknote Series (2021–present, printed since 2022 (current)) ===
After a 12-year delay due to the start of print run for subsequent release to public of New Generation Currency from November to December 16, 2010, BSP readied the proposal of the release of polymer banknotes during the time of COVID-19 pandemic under the term of then-Governor Benjamin Diokno in 2021, which they said that the bacteria and viruses will live shorter on the polymer banknote than the traditional paper one.

On April 6, 2022, the BSP in partnership with the Reserve Bank of Australia, released a limited trial polymer version of the 1000-piso banknote, with the same design elements from the New Generation Currency series but now features an image of the Philippine Eagle with a clear window of Sampaguita, the national flower of the Philippines, set to be released to the public on April 18, 2022. The banknote is also the first to be printed which features the 2020 logo of the Bangko Sentral ng Pilipinas, which has received much criticism from the general public. In an interview, Bangko Sentral ng Pilipinas Governor Benjamin Diokno stated that the new series will focus on fauna and flora in the Philippines.

On December 19, 2024, the designs for the 50, 100 and 500 piso polymer banknotes were revealed during a presentation to President Ferdinand Marcos Jr., who led the unveiling ceremony in Malacañang, and have been in circulation since December 23, 2024, in limited quantities and in the Greater Manila area.

First Philippine Polymer banknote series
Image		Value	Dimensions	Main Color	Design		Date of first issue	Usage in circulation
Obverse	Reverse	Value	Dimensions	Main Color	Obverse	Reverse	Date of first issue	Usage in circulation
		₱50	160 mm × 66 mm (6.3 in × 2.6 in)	Red	Visayan leopard cat (Prionailurus bengalensis rabori), Vidal's Lanutan (Hibiscus campylosiphon)	Taal Lake in Batangas; Caranx ignobilis (maliputo, giant trevally); Batangas embroidery design	December 19, 2024	Limited
		₱100	160 mm × 66 mm (6.3 in × 2.6 in)	Violet (mauve)	Palawan peacock-pheasant (Polyplectron napoleonis), Ceratocentron fesselii orchid	Mayon Volcano in Albay; Rhincodon typus (whale shark, butanding); Bicol textile design	December 19, 2024	Limited
		₱500	160 mm × 66 mm (6.3 in × 2.6 in)	Yellow	Visayan spotted deer (Rusa alfredi), Acanthephippium mantinianum orchid	Subterranean Underground River in Puerto Princesa, Palawan; Tanygnathus lucionensis (blue-naped parrot); Southern Philippines cloth design	December 19, 2024	Limited
		₱1000	160 mm × 66 mm (6.3 in × 2.6 in)	Blue	Philippine eagle (Pithecophaga jefferyi), Sampaguita (Jasminum sambac)	Tubbataha Reefs Natural Park in Sulu Sea; Pinctada maxima (South Sea pearl); Mindanao design for T'nalak (Ikat-dyed abaca)	April 6, 2022	Wide
For table standards, see the banknote specification table.

== Commemorative banknotes ==
Commemorative banknotes have been issued by the Bangko Sentral ng Pilipinas to memorialize events of historic significance to the Philippines. Most commonly they were issued by adding a commemorative overprint on the watermark area of a circulating denomination. Less common are especially-designed non-circulating commemorative banknotes sold to collectors at a premium over face value.

=== Commemorative overprint banknotes summary ===
- Ang Bagong Lipunan Series:
  - 50-piso, 1978: Sergio Osmeña Centennial
  - 10-piso, 1981: Inauguration of President Ferdinand Marcos
  - 2-piso, 1981: Pope John Paul II's visit to the Philippines
- 5-piso, New Design Series:
  - 1986: President Corazon Aquino's visit to the United States
  - 1987: Canonization of Blessed Lorenzo Ruiz
  - 1989: 40th Anniversary of Bangko Sentral ng Pilipinas
  - 1990: Kababaihan Para sa Kaunlaran (Women for Progress)
  - 1990: 2nd Plenary Council of the Philippines
- 50-piso, New Design Series:
  - 1997, 1999: 50 Years of Central Banking in the Philippines
  - 2012: DFA-ASEAN 45th Anniversary
  - 2013: Canonization of St. Pedro Calungsod
  - 2013: PDIC 50th Anniversary
  - 2013: Trinity University of Asia 50th Anniversary
- 100-piso, New Design Series:
  - 1997–1998: Philippine Declaration of Independence Centennial
  - 2008: University of the Philippines Centennial
  - 2011: UP College of Law Centennial
  - 2011: Ateneo Law School 75th Anniversary
  - 2012: De La Salle University Centennial
  - 2012: Philippine Masonic Centennial
  - 2012: Manila Hotel Centennial
  - 2013: Bangko Sentral ng Pilipinas 20th Anniversary
  - 2013: Department of Agriculture/ National Year of Rice
  - 2013: Iglesia ni Cristo Centennial
  - 2013: Pilipinas Shell Petroleum Corporation Centennial
- Other, New Design Series:
  - 20-piso, 2004-2005: International Year of Microcredit
  - All denominations in production (20-piso to 1000-piso), 2009: 60th Anniversary of Central Banking in the Philippines
  - 200-piso, 2011: University of Santo Tomas 400th Anniversary
  - 500-piso, 2012: Asian Development Bank Manila 2012 Board of Governors Annual Meeting
- 20-piso, New Generation Currency:
  - 2023: 30th Anniversary of Bangko Sentral ng Pilipinas

=== Higher value commemorative banknotes ===
==== 2,000 piso ====
The 2000 piso bill showing the inauguration of Joseph Estrada (top) and the Philippine Centennial led by Fidel V. Ramos (bottom). Note that the ₱2,000 currency is only commemorative and is currently not in circulation

The Central Bank of the Philippines (Bangko Sentral ng Pilipinas) issued only 300,000 pieces of this 216 mm × 133 mm (8.5 in × 5.2 in) 2,000 Philippine peso centennial commemorative legal tender banknote. Another version, with the same design but measured at 160 mm × 66 mm (6.3 in × 2.6 in), was also planned to be issued as legal tender in 2001, but due to the ouster of President Joseph Estrada as the result of the Second EDSA revolution (EDSA People Power II), the notes were stored in the vaults of the Bangko Sentral ng Pilipinas. As of 2010, the bank was considering destroying the bulk of the unissued notes (known as the "New Millennium" or "Erap" notes), saving only 50,000 of the five million pieces to be demonetized for "historical, educational, numismatic, or other purposes". However, in 2012 the bank began selling the note in a folder that clearly stipulates that the notes are not legal tender.

The obverse side features President Joseph Estrada taking his oath of office on June 30, 1998, in the historic Barasoain Church, the seat of the first democratic republic in Asia shown in the background as well as the scroll containing the excerpt texts from the Preamble of the Malolos Constitution and the place (Barasoain) and the date (January 20, 1899 in words) of ratification written in Spanish, and the seal of the BSP (Bangko Sentral ng Pilipinas). The reverse side depicts the re-enactment of the declaration of Philippine Independence at the Aguinaldo Shrine in Kawit, Cavite on June 12, 1998, by President Fidel V. Ramos and also features the Philippine Centennial Commission logo, but in the smaller version, it was replaced by the phrase of "Tiwala Kay Bathala, Pagmamahal sa Bayan". The security features of the note include a 3-dimensional cylinder mold-made portrait watermark of the two presidents and the years 1898–1998 (in smaller version, the watermark 1898–1998 was removed), iridescent band, color-shift windowed security thread, concealed image and perfect see-through register.

==== 100,000 piso ====
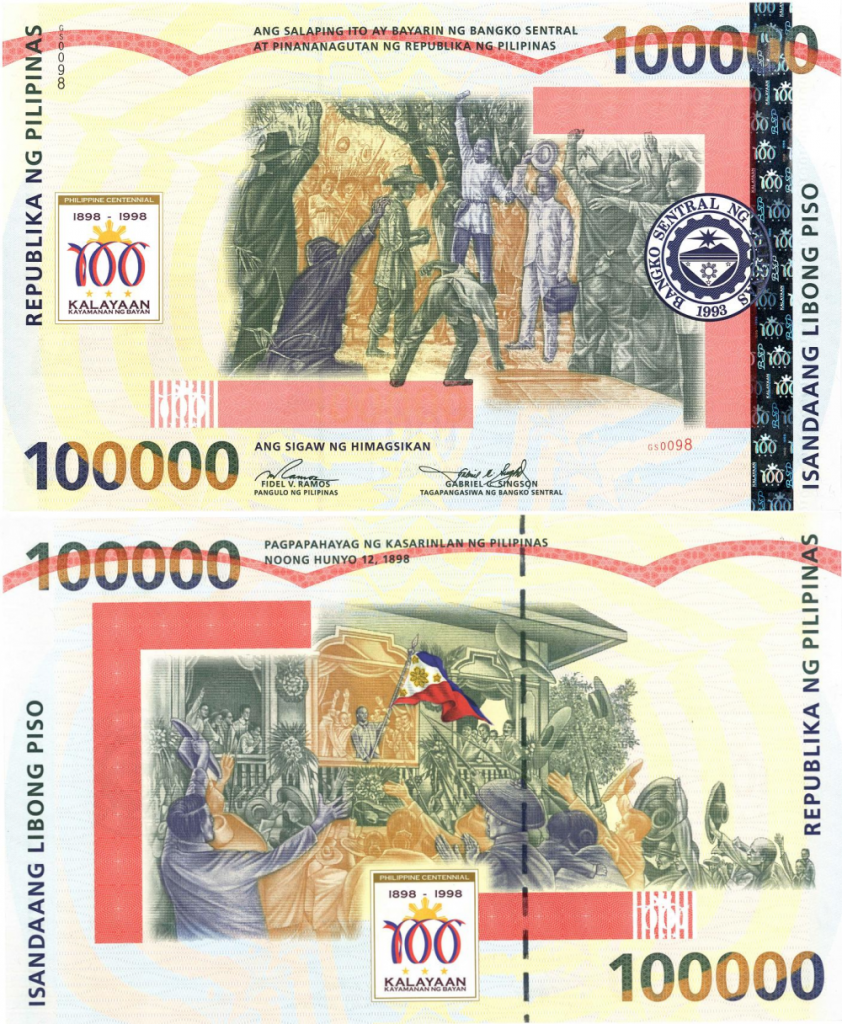
Commemorative ₱100,000 bank note displaying the Katipunan during the Philippine Revolution (top), depiction of the Philippine Declaration of Independence on June 12, 1898 (bottom)

The 100,000-peso centennial note, measuring 356 mm × 216 mm (14.0 in × 8.5 in), was accredited by the Guinness Book of World Records as the world's largest legal tender note in terms of size. 1,000 pieces were issued during the celebration of the centennial of Philippine independence in 1998. It has since been surpassed by the somewhat larger 600 Malaysian ringgit banknote on December 14, 2017.

==== 5,000 piso ====
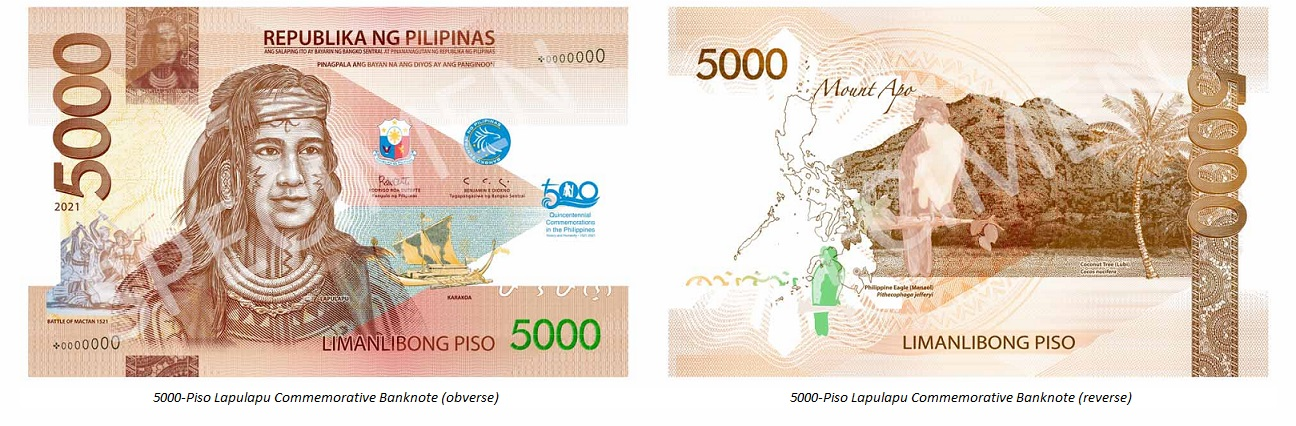
Commemorative ₱5,000 bank note displaying the national hero Lapulapu, considered as the first Filipino to resist Spanish rule

On January 18, 2021, Bangko Sentral ng Pilipinas, in cooperation with the Quincentennial Commemorations in the Philippines launches the 5,000-Piso Commemorative Non-Circulating Banknote, in honor of heroism of Lapulapu. On its obverse, the banknote depicts a young Lapulapu, an image of the Battle of Mactan, the QCP logo, and the Karakoa, the large outrigger warships used by native Filipinos, while on its reverse shows the Philippine eagle, or the Manaol, which symbolizes clear vision, freedom, and strength; and which embodies the ancient Visayan belief that all living creatures originated from an eagle, also featured are the tree of a coconut, which was food the people of Samar provided to Ferdinand Magellan and his crew; and Mount Apo, which is located in Mindanao, where the circumnavigators finally found directional clues to their intended destination of Maluku or the Spice Island.

==== 3,000 piso ====
On June 10, 2026, Bangko Sentral ng Pilipinas, in cooperation with the Supreme Court of the Philippines, launches the 3,000-Piso Commemorative Non-Circulating Banknote to celebrate the 125th anniversary of the Supreme Court. On its obverse, the banknote depicts Cayetano Arellano, the first-ever Chief Justice, an image of en banc oral arguments at the Supreme Court Session Hall in Manila, and the logo of the 125th anniversary of the Supreme Court of the Philippines, while on its reverse shows the facade of the Supreme Court New Building, the statue of the blindfolded Lady Justice holding a pair of scales and a sword, logo of the Supreme Court of the Philippines, the phrase of "Batas at Bayan", the years 1901-2026, and the list of Chief Justices since 1901. And it is the first-ever banknote with a vertical orientation, which appears on the reverse side of the note.

Higher denominations
Image		Value	Dimensions	Main Color	Description		Date	
Obverse	Reverse	Value	Dimensions	Main Color	Obverse	Reverse	First issue	Withdrawal
		₱2,000	216 mm × 133 mm (8.5 in × 5.2 in)	Blue and violet	President Joseph Estrada taking his oath of office on June 30, 1998, in the historic Barasoain Church, the seat of the first democratic republic in Asia shown in the background as well as the scroll containing the excerpt texts from the Preamble of the Malolos Constitution and the place (Barasoain) and the date (January 20, 1899 in words) of ratification written in Spanish, and the seal of the BSP (Bangko Sentral ng Pilipinas)	Re-enactment of the declaration of Philippine Independence led by President Fidel Ramos at the Aguinaldo Shrine in Kawit, Cavite on June 12, 1998, Philippine Centennial Commission logo	1998	August 1, 2019
		₱2,000	160 mm × 66 mm (6.3 in × 2.6 in)	Blue and violet	President Joseph Estrada taking his oath of office on June 30, 1998, in the historic Barasoain Church, the seat of the first democratic republic in Asia shown in the background as well as the scroll containing the excerpt texts from the Preamble of the Malolos Constitution and the place (Barasoain) and the date (January 20, 1899 in words) of ratification written in Spanish, and the seal of the BSP (Bangko Sentral ng Pilipinas)	Re-enactment of the declaration of Philippine Independence led by President Fidel Ramos at the Aguinaldo Shrine in Kawit, Cavite on June 12, 1998, the phrase of "Tiwala Kay Bathala, Pagmamahal sa Bayan"	2001 (as supposed legal tender)	Never circulated
		₱3,000	160 mm × 66 mm (6.3 in × 2.6 in)	Purple	Cayetano Arellano, image of an en banc oral arguments at the Supreme Court Session Hall in Manila, logo of the 125th anniversary of the Supreme Court of the Philippines	Facade of the Supreme Court New Building, statue of the blindfolded Lady Justice holding a pair of scales and a sword, logo of the Supreme Court of the Philippines, the phrase of "Batas at Bayan", 1901-2026, list of Chief Justices since 1901	2026	
		₱5,000	216 mm × 133 mm (8.5 in × 5.2 in)	Brown	Lapulapu, Battle of Mactan, Karakoa, seal of the BSP (Bangko Sentral ng Pilipinas), 2021 Quincentennial Commemoration logo	Philippine eagle (Manaol), Coconut tree (Lubi), Mount Apo	2021	
		₱100,000	356 mm × 216 mm (14.0 in × 8.5 in)	Yellow-orange	Cry of Pugad Lawin, Philippine Centennial Commission logo, Former Bangko Sentral ng Pilipinas logo	Philippine Declaration of Independence, Philippine Centennial Commission logo	1998	August 1, 2019
