= Philippine twenty-peso note =

Banknote of the Philippines

Twenty pesos
- Country: Philippines
- Value: ₱20
- Width: 160 mm
- Height: 66 mm
- Security features: Security fibers, watermark, see-through registration device, concealed value, security thread
- Material used: 80% cotton 20% abacá fiber
- Years of printing: 1903–2023

Obverse
- Design: Manuel L. Quezon, declaration of Tagalog as the basis for the national language, and Malacañan Palace
- Designer: Studio 5 Designs
- Design date: 2017

Reverse
- Design: Banaue Rice Terraces, Asian palm civet (Paradoxurus hermaphroditus), Cordilleras weave design
- Designer: Studio 5 Designs
- Design date: 2017

The Philippine twenty-peso note (Filipino: Dalawampung piso (formal), bente pesos (vernacular)) (₱20) is a denomination of Philippine currency. It is the smallest banknote denomination in general circulation in the Philippines. Philippine president Manuel L. Quezon is currently featured on the front side of the note, while the Banaue Rice Terraces and the Asian palm civet are featured on the reverse side.

== History ==
=== Pre-independence ===
- 1905–1917: Philippine Islands Silver Certificates were issued with an image of the Mayon Volcano.
- 1917–1936: Philippine National Bank issued notes, featuring congressman William A. Jones on the obverse.
- 1918–1935: Philippine Treasury Certificates issued with an image of the Mayon Volcano.
- 1920–1933: Bank of the Philippine Islands issued notes.
- 1937: Philippine Commonwealth issued treasury certificate which features an image of the Mayon Volcano. This series were later overprinted with the word "VICTORY" on the reverse after the liberation of the Philippines under Japanese rule in 1944.
- 1949: Philippine Victory, Central Bank of the Philippines Victory issues of 20-peso bill featuring image of the Mayon Volcano.

=== Version history ===
	Philippines (1936-1941)	Victory Series No. 66 (1944)	Victory-CBP Banknote Series (1949)
Obverse			
Reverse			

=== Independence ===
Quezon first appeared on the twenty peso bill upon the release of the Pilipino series notes in 1967.

==== English series (1951–1974) ====
The obverse features the portraits of Andrés Bonifacio and Emilio Jacinto, two important figures of the Katipunan movement during the Philippine Revolution. The reverse features the Kartilya ng Katipunan, and the Cry of Balintawak Monument.

==== Pilipino series (1969–1974) ====
In 1967, Manuel L. Quezon replaced the portraits of Bonifacio and Jacinto. The note is now predominantly orange in color. On the reverse, it now features the Malacañan Palace. The design of the obverse was later revised, the font for the text Republika ng Pilipinas and Dalawampung Piso was changed, and the color of the portrait of Quezon was changed from brown to orange and geometric lines were added on the sides and the watermark area of the note. This design was later used when the Ang Bagong Lipunan series was released in 1973.

==== Ang Bagong Lipunan series (1973–1996) ====
In 1973, the "Ang Bagong Lipunan" text was added and was overprinted on the watermark area.

==== New Design series (1986–2018) ====
In January 1986, a month before the People Power Revolution, the note was completely redesigned and new elements regarding Quezon's accomplishments were added on the right side, namely the establishment of Tagalog as the Philippine national language (Wikang Pambansa), the coat-of-arms of the Commonwealth and the approval of the 1935 Constitution (Saligang Batas 1935). The Malacañang Palace picture at the reverse was updated to reflect the renovations to the building itself. The banknote was designed by Angel Cacnio.

After the creation of the Bangko Sentral ng Pilipinas in 1993, its new logo was incorporated on all the New Design series bills.

Starting with banknotes printed in 1998, the year of printing was added at the bottom of the denomination value located at the upper left corner of the obverse. The names of the signatories on the bills were later added starting with banknotes featuring the signature of President Joseph Estrada.

==== New Generation series (2010–2023) ====
In 2010, the portrait of Manuel L. Quezon was revised and the Malacañang Palace was moved from the reverse to the bottom center of the obverse. The reverse now features the Banaue Rice Terraces and the Asian palm civet.

In 2017, an updated version of the New Generation series 20 peso banknote was issued with changes in the font size of the year of issue and the italicization of the scientific name on the reverse side.

In 2019, the 20 peso note will be replaced by a coin that will be released in the first quarter of 2020 to solve the overuse of this banknote, as it only takes a year or less to planned replace it with a new banknote based on a research by the University of the Philippines. The Bangko Sentral ng Pilipinas states that the new 20 peso coin lasts for 10 to 15 years, longer than a 20 peso banknote. As such, printing of the 20 peso note was stopped by the BSP in 2023.

The new BSP logo which was redesigned in January 2021 was adopted in all NGC banknotes starting with the 2022 issued banknotes featuring the signatures of President Ferdinand Marcos Jr. and BSP Governor Felipe Medalla.

=== Version history ===
	English Series (1951–1971)	Pilipino Series (1969–1974)	Ang Bagong Lipunan Series (1973–1996)	New Design/BSP Series (1986–2018)	New Generation Currency Series (2010–2023)
Obverse					
Reverse					

== Commemorative issues ==
Throughout its existence, the twenty peso bill has often been overprinted to commemorate certain events, namely:

- International Year of Microcredit commemorative bill - On November 1, 2004, as part of the world launching of the United Nations Year of Microcredit in 2005, the Bangko Sentral ng Pilipinas issued 10 million pieces of the 20 peso bill with an overprint of the official logo and the phrase "Sustainable Microfinance Services for the Filipino Entrepreneurial Poor" on the bottom. The version with the signature of Amando M. Tetangco, Jr. was released in 2005.
- 60 years of Central Banking commemorative bill - On July 9, 2009, the Bangko Sentral ng Pilipinas introduced 12 million banknotes (2 million banknotes for each denomination) with an overprint commemorating 60 years of central banking. The overprint appears on the watermark area on all six circulating denominations.
- 30th anniversary of Bangko Sentral ng Pilipinas commemorative bill - In 2023, the Bangko Sentral ng Pilipinas introduced a commemorative banknote to commemorate the 30th anniversary of the re-establishment of the Bangko Sentral ng Pilipinas, as prescribed in Republic Act 7653 (the New Central Bank Act of 1993). It is the first commemorative banknote under the New Generation Currency series.

== Printing years ==
Banknote series	Year	President of the Philippines	BSP Governor	Prefix
English Series	1951–1953	Elpidio Quirino	Miguel Cuaderno Sr.	A
English Series	1953–1957	Ramon Magsaysay	Miguel Cuaderno Sr.	B–AG
English Series	1961	Carlos P. Garcia	Andres V. Castillo	AH–AS
English Series	1961–1965	Diosdado P. Macapagal	Andres V. Castillo	AT–DV
English Series	1970	Ferdinand E. Marcos	Gregorio S. Licaros	DW–EK
Pilipino Series	1969–1970	Ferdinand E. Marcos	Alfonso Calalang	A–Q
Pilipino Series	1970–1973	Ferdinand E. Marcos	Gregorio S. Licaros	R–AA
Ang Bagong Lipunan Series	1973–1981	Ferdinand E. Marcos	Gregorio S. Licaros	AJ–QY, RH
Ang Bagong Lipunan Series	1981–1984	Ferdinand E. Marcos	Jaime C. Laya	QZ–RG, RJ–UW
Ang Bagong Lipunan Series	1984–1985	Ferdinand E. Marcos	Jose B. Fernandez Jr.	UX–XR
New Design Series	1986	Ferdinand E. Marcos	Jose B. Fernandez Jr.	A–AK
New Design Series	1986–1990	Corazon C. Aquino	Jose B. Fernandez Jr.	AL–PJ
New Design Series	1990–1992	Corazon C. Aquino	Jose L. Cuisia Jr.	PK–WW
New Design Series	1992–1993	Fidel V. Ramos	Jose L. Cuisia Jr.	WX (Black)– K (Red)
New Design Series	1993–1998	Fidel V. Ramos	Gabriel C. Singson	A (Red)– KS (Black)
New Design Series	1998–1999	Joseph Estrada	Gabriel C. Singson	KT (Black)– BD (Blue)
New Design Series	1999–2001	Joseph Estrada	Rafael B. Buenaventura	BE–MZ (Blue)
New Design Series	2001–2005	Gloria Macapagal Arroyo	Rafael B. Buenaventura	NA (Blue)– NZ (Black)
New Design Series	2005–2010	Gloria Macapagal Arroyo	Amando M. Tetangco Jr.	PA–DG
New Design Series	2010–2012	Benigno S. Aquino III	Amando M. Tetangco Jr.	DE–FC
New Generation Currency Series	2010–2016	Benigno S. Aquino III	Amando M. Tetangco Jr.	
New Generation Currency Series	2016–2017	Rodrigo Duterte	Amando M. Tetangco Jr.	
New Generation Currency Series	2017–2019	Rodrigo Duterte	Nestor Espenilla Jr.	
New Generation Currency Series	2019–2022	Rodrigo Duterte	Benjamin E. Diokno	
New Generation Currency Series	2022–2023	Bongbong Marcos	Felipe M. Medalla	

== See also ==
- Philippine twenty-peso coin, its equivalent coin circulating alongside its original banknote
