= Philippine ten-peso note =

Former denomination of Philippine currency

Ten pesos
- Country: Philippines
- Value: 10 pesos
- Width: 160 mm
- Height: 66 mm
- Security features: Security fibers, Watermark, See-through registration device, Concealed value, Security thread
- Material used: 90% cotton 10% linen
- Years of printing: 1903–2001

Obverse
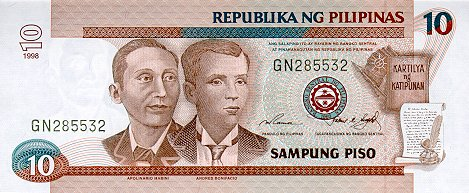
- Design: Apolinario Mabini, Andrés Bonifacio, Katipunan flag, Kartilya ng Katipunan, Malolos Constitution
- Designer: Rafael Asuncion
- Design date: 1997

Reverse
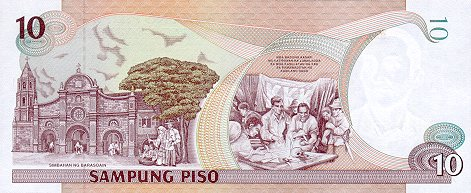
- Design: Barasoain Church, Blood Compact of Katipuneros
- Designer: Rafael Asuncion
- Design date: 1997

The Philippine ten-peso note (Filipino: Sampung Piso) (₱10) was a denomination of Philippine currency. In its final incarnation, Apolinario Mabini and Andrés Bonifacio are featured on the front side of the notes, while the Barasoain Church and a Blood Compact scene of the Katipuneros on the reverse side. This banknote was circulated until the demonetization of main banknotes under the New Design/BSP series on January 3, 2018. Its printing was stopped when the ten-peso coins, first introduced in 2000, became regular to the BSP coin series in July 2001.

== History ==
=== Pre-independence ===
- 1852: El Banco Español Filipino de Isabel II (modern-day Bank of the Philippine Islands) issued 10 pesos fuertes notes.

| | Series of 1852 | Series of 1877 | Series of 1896 |
|---|---|---|---|
| Obverse and Reverse | | | |

- 1903: Philippine Islands issued silver certificates. Features the portrait of George Washington.
- 1908: Banco Español Filipino issued notes.
- 1918: Philippine Treasury Certificates issued with a portrait of George Washington.
- 1920: BPI issued notes.
- 1936: PNB issued notes.
- 1937: Philippine Commonwealth issued treasury certificate. Features the portrait of George Washington. This series were later overprinted with the word "VICTORY" on the reverse after the liberation of the Philippines under Japanese rule in 1944.
- 1942: Japanese government issued series. Features a farmer in a forest on the right of the obverse, with the text "TEN PESOS" on the center. Another version, this time featuring the Rizal Monument on the right of the obverse, was released in 1944. The banknotes ceased to be legal tender after the liberation.
- 1949: Victory Series whoever in here released in 1949 in back "VICTORY, CENTRAL BANK OF THE PHILIPPINES" at back

=== Version history ===
| | Philippines (1936-1941) | Victory Series No. 66 (1944) | Victory-CBP Banknote Series (1949) |
|---|---|---|---|
| Obverse | | | |
| Reverse | | | |

=== Independence ===
==== English series (1951–1974) ====
Features the portraits of Mariano Gomez, Jose Burgos, and Jacinto Zamora, collectively known as Gomburza, three Filipino priests who were executed on February 17, 1872, at Bagumbayan in Manila, Philippines by Spanish colonial authorities on charges of subversion arising from the 1872 Cavite mutiny. The reverse features the Urdaneta and Legaspi Monument.

==== Pilipino series (1969–1974) ====
In 1967, Apolinario Mabini replaced the portraits of Gomburza. The note is now predominantly brown in color. On the reverse, it features the Barasoain Church, where the drafting of the Malolos Constitution and the inauguration of the First Philippine republic took place. The design of the obverse was later revised, the font for the text Republika ng Pilipinas and Sampung Piso were changed, the color of the portrait of Mabini was changed to a lighter shade of brown and geometric lines were added on the sides and the watermark area of the bill.

==== Ang Bagong Lipunan series (1973–1996) ====
In 1973, the "Ang Bagong Lipunan" text was added and was overprinted on the watermark area.

==== New Design series (1985–2018) ====
In 1985, the bill was completely redesigned but the portrait of Mabini remained the same. New elements regarding Mabini's career were shown on the right side, namely, his “El Verdadero Decalogo" ("The True Dialogue") which served as the introduction to the Malolos Constitution as a quill and an inkwell. The banknote was designed by Rafael Asuncion.

After the creation of the "Bangko Sentral ng Pilipinas" in 1993, its new logo was incorporated on all the New Design series bills.

Starting with the red "EQ" to black prefix "MS" from 1995 to May 1997, the titles of signatories were moved further to the right, and the style of Gabriel Singson's signature was changed.

In 1997, the portrait of Andres Bonifacio was added beside Mabini, and elements from the Katipunan movement were added on the right side of the bill; one of the Katipunan flags and the Kartilya ng Katipunan. The design of the reverse was also changed. The scene from the Blood Compact of Katipuneros, previously featured in the Pilipino and Ang Bagong Lipunan series ₱5 bill was added on the right side of the Barasoain Church. The year of printing was added at the bottom of the denomination value located at the upper left corner of the obverse. However, the watermark area still only features Apolinario Mabini and the embedded security thread was on the right side of the signature of BSP governor until 1998 thus the notes with Andres Bonifacio from 1997 to 1998 uses the paper that would supposedly print the original 1985 version of the banknote with only Apolinario Mabini.

In 1998, Andres Bonifacio was added on the watermark area of the banknote and the embedded security thread was aligned beside the portrait.

In 1999, the names of the signatories on the bills were added starting with banknotes featuring the signature of President Joseph Estrada.

The printing of this banknote was stopped when the Bangko Sentral ng Pilipinas made the ₱10 coin denomination a BSP Series regular coin in July 2001, a year after its release a year earlier in 2000, with the notes using the letters "FM" and with the signatures of President Gloria Macapagal-Arroyo and BSP Governor Rafael B. Buenaventura being the last prefix used and batch of banknotes printed during its production (with the last batch comes in a folder).

However, existing banknotes, along with 5 peso banknotes, continued to be seen commonly in circulation from 2001 to 2004, and from 2004 until the demonetization of main banknotes under the New Design Series on January 3, 2018, it still had a liability of the BSP (with January 2018 submission of old banknotes are only for those who secure a receipt showing that they went to the central bank before the December 29, 2017 final deadline of submission due to not being able to accommodate several individuals who tried to exchange their notes because of the unexpected number of people who arrived) although now rarely circulated.

=== Version history ===
| | English Series (1951–1971) | Pilipino Series (1969–1974) | Ang Bagong Lipunan Series (1973–1996) | New Design/BSP Series (1985–2018) |
|---|---|---|---|---|
| Obverse | | | | |
| Reverse | | | | |

== Commemorative issues ==
Throughout its existence, the ten peso bill was often overprinted to commemorate certain events, namely:

- Inauguration of President Ferdinand Marcos: The Bangko Sentral ng Pilipinas released the commemorative banknote in 1981 and features the portrait of President Ferdinand Marcos. Around it are the words "PANGULO NG PILIPINAS - FERDINAND E. MARCOS" with the date "HUNYO 30, 1981" is displayed below. There are two versions of the overprint, one with the wide collar and another with the narrow collar.

== Printing years ==
| Banknote series | Year | President of the Philippines | BSP Governor | Prefix |
|---|---|---|---|---|
| English Series | 1951–1953 | Elpidio Quirino | Miguel Cuaderno Sr. | A–B |
| English Series | 1953–1957 | Ramon Magsaysay | Miguel Cuaderno Sr. | B–AN |
| English Series | 1957–1960 | Carlos P. Garcia | Miguel Cuaderno Sr. | AP–BD |
| English Series | 1961 | Carlos P. Garcia | Andres V. Castillo | BD–BP |
| English Series | 1961–1965 | Diosdado P. Macapagal | Andres V. Castillo | BQ–EF |
| English Series | 1970 | Ferdinand E. Marcos | Gregorio S. Licaros | EG–FW |
| Pilipino Series | 1969–1970 | Ferdinand E. Marcos | Alfonso Calalang | A–Q |
| Pilipino Series | 1970–1973 | Ferdinand E. Marcos | Gregorio S. Licaros | R–AA |
| Ang Bagong Lipunan Series | 1973–1981 | Ferdinand E. Marcos | Gregorio S. Licaros | AC–QD |
| Ang Bagong Lipunan Series | 1981–1984 | Ferdinand E. Marcos | Jaime C. Laya | QE–YU |
| Ang Bagong Lipunan Series | 1984–1985 | Ferdinand E. Marcos | Jose B. Fernandez Jr. | YV (Black)– FZ (Red) |
| New Design Series | 1985–1986 | Ferdinand E. Marcos | Jose B. Fernandez Jr. | A–CC |
| New Design Series | 1986–1990 | Corazon C. Aquino | Jose B. Fernandez Jr. | CD–RQ |
| New Design Series | 1990–1992 | Corazon C. Aquino | Jose L. Cuisia Jr. | RR (Black)– F (Red) |
| New Design Series | 1992–1993 | Fidel V. Ramos | Jose L. Cuisia Jr. | G–CA |
| New Design Series | 1993–1998 | Fidel V. Ramos | Gabriel C. Singson | A (Red)– DD (Red) |
| New Design Series | 1998–1999 | Joseph Estrada | Gabriel C. Singson | DE–JV |
| New Design Series | 1999–2001 | Joseph Estrada | Rafael B. Buenaventura | JW–VZ (Red), DE (Black) |
| New Design Series | 2001 | Gloria Macapagal Arroyo | Rafael B. Buenaventura | WA (Red)– FM (Black) |

== See also ==
Philippine ten-peso coin
