= Pilipino Series =

Series of Filipino currency

The Pilipino Series banknotes is the name used to refer to Philippine banknotes and coins issued by the Central Bank of the Philippines from 1969 to 1974, during the term of President Ferdinand Marcos. It was succeeded by the Ang Bagong Lipunan Series of banknotes, to which it shared a similar design. The lowest denomination of the series is 1-piso and the highest is 100-piso.

This series represented a radical change from the English series. The bills underwent Filipinization and a design change.

After the declaration of Proclamation № 1081 on September 23, 1972, the Central Bank demonetized all the existing banknotes (both the English and Pilipino series) on March 1, 1974, pursuant to Presidential Decree No. 378. All of the unissued banknotes were sent back to the De La Rue plant in London for overprinting the watermark area with the words "ANG BAGONG LIPUNAN" and an oval geometric safety design.

== Banknotes ==
Pilipino Series
Image		Value	Dimensions	Main Color	Description		Year	
Obverse	Reverse	Value	Dimensions	Main Color	Obverse	Reverse	First issue	Withdrawal
1 pesos		₱1	160 mm × 66 mm	Blue	José Rizal	Declaration of Philippine Independence	May 5, 1969	March 1, 1974
5 pesos		₱5	160 mm × 66 mm	Green	Andres Bonifacio	Blood Compact of the Katipuneros	May 5, 1969	March 1, 1974
10 pesos		₱10	160 mm × 66 mm	Brown	Apolinario Mabini	Barasoain Church	May 5, 1969	March 1, 1974
20 pesos		₱20	160 mm × 66 mm	Orange	Manuel L. Quezon	Malacañang Palace	May 5, 1969	March 1, 1974
50 pesos		₱50	160 mm × 66 mm	Red	Sergio Osmeña	Legislative Building	May 5, 1969	March 1, 1974
100 pesos		₱100	160 mm × 66 mm	Violet	Manuel Roxas	Former Bangko Sentral ng Pilipinas Building	May 5, 1969	March 1, 1974
For table standards, see the banknote specification table.

== Coins ==
Pilipino Series
Image		Face Value	Technical parameters			Description			Year of	
Obverse	Reverse	Face Value	Diameter	Mass	Composition	Edge	Obverse	Reverse	first minting	demonetization
		1¢	15.25 mm	0.50 g	Aluminum	Plain	Lapu-Lapu	State title, coat of arms, year of minting	May 5, 1967	Jan 2, 1998
		5¢	18.6 mm	2.5 g	Brass	Plain	Melchora Aquino	State title, coat of arms, year of minting	May 5, 1967	Jan 2, 1998
		10¢	17.85 mm	2 g	Nickel-brass	Reeded	Francisco Baltazar	State title, coat of arms, year of minting	May 5, 1967	Jan 2, 1998
		25¢	21.0 mm	4 g	Nickel-brass	Reeded	Juan Luna	State title, coat of arms, year of minting	May 5, 1967	Jan 2, 1998
		50¢	27.5 mm	8 g	Nickel-brass	Reeded	Marcelo H. del Pilar	State title, coat of arms, year of minting	May 5, 1967	Jan 2, 1998
		₱1	33.0 mm	14.45 g	Nickel-brass	Reeded	José Rizal	State title, coat of arms, year of minting between the words "BANGKO" and "SENTRAL"	February 6, 1972	Jan 2, 1998

== Designs ==
=== Banknotes ===
==== 1 piso ====
Colored blue, the main design of the note features a portrait of the national hero of the Philippines José Rizal on the front and the Declaration of Philippine Independence on the back.

==== 5 piso ====
Colored green, the main design of the note features a portrait of Filipino revolutionary Andres Bonifacio on the front and a scene of the Blood Compact of the Katipuneros on the back

==== 10 piso ====
Colored brown, the principal design on the note features a portrait of Apolinario Mabini on the front and the Barasoain Church, site of the drafting of the Malolos Constitution and the inauguration of the First Philippine Republic on the back.

==== 20 piso ====
Colored orange, the main design of the note features a portrait of Philippine president Manuel L. Quezon on the front and the Malacañang Palace, the official residence and workplace of the President of the Philippines on the back.

==== 50 piso ====
Colored red, the main design of the note features a portrait of Philippine president Sergio Osmeña on the front and the Legislative Building (today the National Museum of Fine Arts) on the back.

==== 100 piso ====
Colored violet, the principal design of the note features a portrait of Philippine president Manuel A. Roxas on the front and the Former headquarters of the Bangko Sentral ng Pilipinas on the back.

=== Coins ===
==== 1 sentimo ====
Struck in aluminium, the 1 sentimo coin features a profile of Lapu-Lapu on the obverse and the coat of arms of the Philippines on the reverse.

==== 5 sentimos ====
Struck in brass, the 5 sentimos coin features a profile of Melchora Aquino on the obverse and the coat of arms of the Philippines on the reverse.

==== 10 sentimos ====
Struck in nickel-brass, the 10 sentimos coin features a profile of Francisco Baltazar on the obverse and the coat of arms of the Philippines on the reverse.

==== 25 sentimos ====
Struck in nickel-brass, the 25 sentimos coin features a profile of Juan Luna on the obverse and the coat of arms of the Philippines on the reverse.

==== 50 sentimos ====
Struck in nickel-brass, the 50 sentimos coin features a profile of Marcelo H. del Pilar on the obverse and the coat of arms of the Philippines on the reverse.

==== 1 piso ====
Struck in nickel-brass, the 1 piso coin features a profile of the national hero of the Philippines José Rizal on the obverse and the coat of arms of the Philippines on the reverse.
