= Philippine two hundred-peso note =

Denomination of Philippine currency

Two hundred pesos
- Country: Philippines
- Value: ₱200
- Width: 160 mm
- Height: 66 mm
- Security features: Security fibers, watermark, see-through registration device, concealed value, security thread, tactile marks
- Material used: 80% cotton 20% abacá fiber
- Years of printing: 1903–1928; 1949-1959; 2002–2020

Obverse
- Design: Diosdado P. Macapagal, EDSA People Power 2001, Declaration of Philippine Independence, Opening of the Malolos Congress
- Designer: Design Systemat
- Design date: 2017

Reverse
- Design: Chocolate Hills, Bohol, Philippine tarsier (Tarsius syrichta), Visayas weave design
- Designer: Design Systemat
- Design date: 2017

The Philippine two hundred-peso note (Filipino: dalawandaang piso; ₱200) was a denomination of Philippine currency. President Diosdado Macapagal was featured on the front side of the note, and by 2017, President Gloria Macapagal Arroyo's inauguration as the 14th President of the Philippines (EDSA People Power II) is on the lower-left side on the note just in front of the scene of the Declaration of Philippine Independence, and the scene of the opening of the Malolos Congress is also present on the obverse side of the note. From 2010 to 2017, the Aguinaldo Shrine (labeled as "Independence House") and the Barasoain Church were featured on the front side of the note, while the interior of the latter is shown from 2017 to 2020. The Chocolate Hills and the Philippine tarsier are featured on the reverse side. Compared to other denominations, this note is relatively uncommon.

== History ==
=== Pre-independence ===
- 1852: El Banco Español Filipino de Isabel II (modern-day Bank of the Philippine Islands) issued 200 pesos fuertes notes.
- 1903-1928: BPI issued notes. Features a vignette of Lady Justice on the front.

=== Independence ===
Macapagal first appeared on the two hundred peso bill upon the reintroduction of the denomination on June 12, 2002.

- 1951: English series, Features the portrait of Manuel L. Quezon, the 1st president of the Commonwealth of the Philippines. The reverse features the Old Legislative Building. The Legislative Building was later featured on the fifty peso bill upon the introduction of the Pilipino series notes.
- 1959: The 200 and 500 peso notes were withdrawn from circulation on December 31, 1959, pursuant to Philippine Republic Act No. 1516.
- 2002: New Design series, The two hundred peso denomination was not included in the Pilipino and Ang Bagong Lipunan series. The denomination however was reintroduced on June 12, 2002, coinciding with the 17th anniversary of the New Design Series. The note features the portrait of Diosdado P. Macapagal, the 9th President of the Philippines. The obverse also features the Aguinaldo Shrine, where Emilio Aguinaldo proclaimed the country's independence in 1898, on the lower right corner. The reverse features a scene from EDSA II, with Gloria Macapagal Arroyo, Macapagal's daughter, being sworn in as president by Chief Justice Hilario Davide Jr. in January 2001. At the top and below along the threads have the microprint "Bangko Sentral ng Pilipinas" similar to the unused 500-peso Marcos banknote albeit in English where it instead reads "Central Bank of the Philippines" and also extends to the lower-left towards the denomination like with 1000-peso note. The banknote is the direct replacement for the unreleased 2000-piso "New Millennium" banknote (smaller version of the 1998 Centennial) that was scheduled to be circulated for general circulation in 2001 but halted as the result of EDSA 2 and spiritual successor to the five peso note that stopped printing seven years earlier in June 1995 but its existing copies still commonly circulated upon the denomination's release due to its predominantly green color and depiction of Aguinaldo Shrine.
- 2007: The names of signatories' typeface were changed from Friz Quadrata to Helvetica and became lighter, and a space between the signature and name was removed starting with the signatures of President Gloria Macapagal Arroyo and BSP Governor Amando Tetangco Jr.
- 2010: New Generation series, The portrait of Diosdado P. Macapagal was revised, the Arroyo oathtaking was moved from the reverse to the lower left of the obverse with the Aguinaldo Shrine at the background and the Barasoain Church was added on the lower middle. The reverse now features the Chocolate Hills and the Philippine tarsier. This also makes the banknote as a spiritual successor to the ten peso note (which is colored brown) that stopped printing nine years earlier in July 2001 (although the banknote continued to be seen commonly in circulation from 2001 to 2004 and rarely from 2004 until the New Design Series' demonetization in January 2018) aside from the also green-colored five peso due to the series' banknote depiction of Barasoain Church.
- 2017: An updated version of the New Generation series 200 piso banknote was issued with several changes, notably replacing the facades of Aguinaldo Shrine and the Barasoain Church on the front with the former's balcony and latter's interior through the scenes of the Declaration of Philippine Independence and the opening of the Malolos Congress respectively. Also changed for this issue are the font size of the year of issue and the italicization of the scientific name on the reverse.
- 2020: The "enhanced" version of the 200 peso New Generation Currency banknote was released. It added color-changing indigenous patterns to the security threads. Also, six tactile marks were placed for the elderly and the visually impaired, three tactile marks were placed on the extreme left and right side of the front of the note. On that same year, BSP stopped printing the 200-peso banknotes due to low usage. The denomination was also not included when then newly elected President Bongbong Marcos was presented with a series of NGC banknotes bearing his signature.

=== Version history ===
	English Series (1951–1959)	New Design/BSP Series (2002–2018)	New Generation Currency Series (2010–2020)
Obverse			
Reverse			

== Commemorative issues ==
The UST Quadricentennial commemorative note.

- 60 years of Central Banking commemorative bill - On July 9, 2009, the Bangko Sentral ng Pilipinas introduced 12 million banknotes (2 million banknotes for each denomination) with an overprint commemorating 60 years of central banking. The overprint appears on the watermark area on all six circulating denominations.
- UST Quadricentennial commemorative bill - Unveiled before the press conference held on January 21, 2011, Bangko Sentral ng Pilipinas (BSP) issued commemorative 200-peso bills with the Quadricentennial logo (Tongues of Fire) of the University of Santo Tomas (UST) overprinted on it. BSP released two-billion-pesos (10 million notes) worth of these 200-peso bills—in general circulation and legal tender. In addition, the central bank also released 400 copies of uncut two-piece 200-peso bills (amounting to PhP 400.00).

== Printing years ==
Banknote series	Year	President of the Philippines	BSP Governor
English Series	1951	Elpidio Quirino	Miguel Cuaderno Sr.
New Design Series	2002–2004	Gloria Macapagal Arroyo	Rafael B. Buenaventura
New Design Series	2007–2010	Gloria Macapagal Arroyo	Amando M. Tetangco Jr.
New Design Series	2010–2013	Benigno S. Aquino III	Amando M. Tetangco Jr.
New Generation Currency Series	2010–2016	Benigno S. Aquino III	Amando M. Tetangco Jr.
New Generation Currency Series	2016–2017	Rodrigo Duterte	Amando M. Tetangco Jr.
New Generation Currency Series	2017–2019	Rodrigo Duterte	Nestor Espenilla Jr.
New Generation Currency Series	2019–2020	Rodrigo Duterte	Benjamin E. Diokno

== See also ==
- Philippine five-peso note
- Philippine ten-peso note
- Philippine one hundred-peso note
