= Ang Bagong Lipunan Series =

Series of Filipino currency

₱2, ₱5, ₱10, ₱20, ₱50, ₱100
- Country: Philippines
- Value: Piso ng Pilipinas (Filipino)
- Years of printing: 1973 to 1985

The Ang Bagong Lipunan Series (literally, ”The New Society Series") is the name used to refer to Philippine banknotes and coins issued by the Central Bank of the Philippines from 1973 to 1985. It was succeeded by the New Design series of banknotes. The lowest denomination of the series is 2-piso and the highest is 100-piso.

== Background ==
After the declaration of martial law by President Ferdinand Marcos on September 23, 1972, the Central Bank was to demonetize the existing banknotes in 1974, pursuant to Presidential Decree No. 168, later amended by Presidential Decree 378. All the unissued Pilipino Series banknotes (except the one peso banknote) were sent back to the De La Rue plant in London for overprinting the watermark area with the words "ANG BAGONG LIPUNAN" and an oval geometric safety design. The one peso note was replaced with the two peso note, which features the same elements of the demonetized "Pilipino" series one peso note.

On September 7, 1978, the Security Printing Plant in Quezon City was inaugurated to produce banknotes inside the country. Alongside the opening of its printing facilities, the seal of the Bangko Sentral ng Pilipinas was simplified.

The banknotes were still legal tender even after the introduction of the New Design Series banknotes, however, it was seldom used after the EDSA Revolution. The banknotes were eventually demonetized on February 2, 1993 (but were still exchangeable with legal tender currency to the Central Bank until February 2, 1996) after clamors that the banknotes may have been used to buy votes for the 1992 Presidential Elections.

== Banknotes ==
Ang Bagong Lipunan (New Society) Series
Image		Value	Dimensions	Main Color	Description		Year	
Obverse	Reverse	Value	Dimensions	Main Color	Obverse	Reverse	First issue	Withdrawal
2 pesos		₱2	160 mm × 66 mm	Blue	José Rizal	Declaration of Philippine Independence	March 17, 1973	February 2, 1996
5 pesos		₱5	160 mm × 66 mm	Green	Andrés Bonifacio	Blood Compact of the Katipuneros	March 17, 1973	February 2, 1996
10 pesos	10 pesos	₱10	160 mm × 66 mm	Brown	Apolinario Mabini	Barasoain Church	March 17, 1973	February 2, 1996
20 pesos	20 pesos	₱20	160 mm × 66 mm	Orange	Manuel L. Quezon	Malacañang Palace	March 17, 1973	February 2, 1996
50 pesos		₱50	160 mm × 66 mm	Red	Sergio Osmeña	Legislative Building	March 17, 1973	February 2, 1996
100 pesos		₱100	160 mm × 66 mm	Violet	Manuel Roxas	BSP Complex	March 17, 1973	February 2, 1996
For table standards, see the banknote specification table.

== Coins ==
Ang Bagong Lipunan Series
Image		Face Value	Technical parameters			Description			Year of	
Obverse	Reverse	Face Value	Diameter	Mass	Composition	Edge	Obverse	Reverse	first minting	demonetization
		1¢	16.5 mm (length of side of rounded square shaped edge)	1.22 g	Aluminum	Plain	State title, Lapulapu, value	"ANG BAGONG LIPUNAN," BSP logo, year of minting	March 31, 1975	January 2, 1998
		5¢	19 mm (8-pointed rounded scallop edge)	2.5g	Brass	Plain	State title, Melchora Aquino, value	"ANG BAGONG LIPUNAN," BSP logo, year of minting	March 31, 1975	January 2, 1998
		10¢	18 mm	2g	Cupro-Nickel	Reeded	State title, Francisco Baltazar, value	"ANG BAGONG LIPUNAN," BSP logo, year of minting	March 31, 1975	January 2, 1998
		25¢	21.0 mm	4g	Cupro-Nickel	Reeded	State title, Juan Luna, value	"ANG BAGONG LIPUNAN," BSP logo, year of minting	March 31, 1975	January 2, 1998
		₱1	29 mm	9.5g	Cupro-Nickel	Reeded	State title, José Rizal, value	"ANG BAGONG LIPUNAN," coat of arms with the scroll text altered to "ISANG BANSA, ISANG DIWA" ("One Nation, One Spirit") with two digits of the year minted on both sides, bank title	March 31, 1975	January 2, 1998
		₱5	36.5 mm	22g	Cupro-Nickel	Reeded	"ANG BAGONG LIPUNAN," "Setyembre 21, 1972" ("September 21, 1972"), Ferdinand Marcos, year of minting	State title, coat of arms with the scroll text altered to "ISANG BANSA, ISANG DIWA" ("One Nation, One Spirit")	March 31, 1975	January 2, 1998

== Design ==
=== Banknotes ===
==== 2 pesos ====
Colored blue, the main design on the front of the note featured a portrait of the National hero of the Philippines, José Rizal and the scene of the Declaration of Philippine Independence on the back side of the note.

==== 5 pesos ====
Colored green, the main design on the front of the note featured a portrait of revolutionary leader Andrés Bonifacio and the Blood Compact of the Katipuneros on the back side of the note.

==== 10 pesos ====
Colored brown, the main design on the front of the note featured a portrait of Apolinario Mabini and the Barasoain Church, site of the drafting of the Malolos Constitution and the inauguration of the First Philippine Republic, on the back side of the note.

==== 20 pesos ====
Colored orange, the main design on the front of the note featured a portrait of Philippine president Manuel L. Quezon and the Malacañang Palace, the official residence and workplace of the President of the Philippines, on the back side of the note.

==== 50 pesos ====
Colored red, the main design on the front of the note featured a portrait of Philippine president Sergio Osmeña and the Old Legislative Building (now the National Museum of Fine Arts) on the back side of the note.

==== 100 pesos ====
Colored violet, the main design on the front of the note featured a portrait of Philippine president Manuel A. Roxas and the main complex of the Bangko Sentral ng Pilipinas on the back side of the note. Two versions of this denomination were issued during the series' lifespan, one featured the former headquarters of the Bangko Sentral ng Pilipinas (Aduana Building) in Intramuros, a design carried over from the Pilipino Series 100 pesos banknote. The denomination was reissued featuring the then new main complex of the Bangko Sentral ng Pilipinas as its main design.

=== Coins ===
==== 1 sentimo ====
Struck in aluminum, the obverse side of the coin features the state title, the denomination and a portrait of Lapulapu. The reverse side of the coin features the seal of the Bangko Sentral ng Pilipinas.

==== 5 sentimos ====
Struck in brass, the obverse side of the coin features the state title, the denomination and a portrait of Melchora Aquino. The reverse side of the coin features the seal of the Bangko Sentral ng Pilipinas.

==== 10 sentimos ====
Struck in copper-nickel, the obverse side of the coin features the state title, the denomination and a portrait of Francisco Baltazar. The reverse side of the coin features the seal of the Bangko Sentral ng Pilipinas.

==== 25 sentimos ====
Struck in copper-nickel, the obverse side of the coin features the state title, the denomination and a portrait of Juan Luna. The reverse side of the coin features the seal of the Bangko Sentral ng Pilipinas.

==== 1 peso ====
Struck in copper-nickel, the obverse side of the coin features the state title, the denomination and a portrait of José Rizal. The reverse side of the coin features the Coat of arms of the Philippines. The first version, minted from 1975 to 1978, featured a scroll with the inscription Republika ng Pilipinas (Republic of the Philippines). The second version, minted from 1978 to 1982, featured a scroll with the inscription ISANG BANSA, ISANG DIWA (One Nation, One Spirit).

==== 5 pesos ====
Struck in nickel, the obverse side of the coin features the inscription "Ang Bagong Lipunan" (The New Society), a profile of Ferdinand E. Marcos and date of declaration of Martial Law, "SETYEMBRE 21, 1972". The reverse side of the coin features the Coat of arms of the Philippines.

== Commemorative issues ==
Aside from minting expensive commemorative coins for special occasions, overprinted circulating banknotes. The first circulated banknote was in 1978 for the birth centenary of former President Sergio Osmeña; the words IKA-100 TAONG KAARAWAN 1878-1978 were placed near his portrait on the 50-peso banknote.

The next overprint was in 1981 when Pope John Paul II visited the Philippines from February 17 to 21, 1981. The overprint was on the 2-peso banknote on the watermark area. On June 30, 1981, the bust profile of President Marcos were overprinted on the 10-peso banknote to mark his Inauguration on that date.

In 1981, the Central Bank Ad Hoc Committee was authorized to approve or reject designs of circulating banknotes and coins, including commemorative banknotes and coins.

== See also ==
- Philippine peso
- Banknotes of the Philippine peso
- Coins of the Philippine peso
