= Philippine two-peso note =

Two pesos
- Country: Philippines
- Value: 2 pesos
- Width: 160 mm
- Height: 66 mm
- Security features: Security fibers, Watermark, Concealed value, Security thread
- Material used: 90% cotton 10% linen
- Years of printing: 1903–1983

Obverse
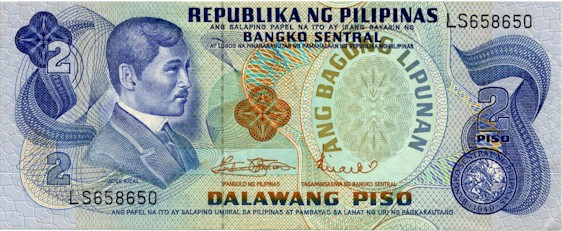
- Design: José Rizal
- Design date: 1973

Reverse
- Design: Declaration of Philippine independence
- Design date: 1973

The Philippine two-peso note (Filipino: Dalawang Piso) (₱2) was a denomination of Philippine currency. On its final release, José Rizal was featured on the front side of the bill, and the Declaration of the Philippine Independence on the reverse side.

This banknote was circulated until it was demonetized in 1996. Its printing was ceased in 1983, when it was replaced by coins featuring Andrés Bonifacio upon the introduction of the Flora and Fauna Series coin series.

== History ==
=== Pre-independence ===
- 1903: Philippine Islands issued silver certificates. Features a portrait of José Rizal.

	Series of 1903	Series of 1906
Obverse and Reverse		

- 1916: PNB issued notes. Features a portrait of José Rizal.
- 1918–1929: Philippine Treasury Certificates issued with a portrait of José Rizal.

	Series of 1918	Series of 1924	Series of 1929
Obverse and Reverse			

- 1937: Philippine Commonwealth issued treasury certificate. Features a portrait of José Rizal. This series were later overprinted with the word "VICTORY" on the reverse after the liberation of the Philippines under Japanese rule in 1944.
- 1949: Philippine Treasury Certificates issued with VICTORY

=== Version history ===
	Philippines (1936-1941)	Victory Series No. 66 (1944)	Victory-CBP Banknote Series (1949)
Obverse			
Reverse			

=== Independence ===
- 1951: English series, Features the portrait of José Rizal, the national hero of the Philippines. The reverse features the landing of Ferdinand Magellan in the Philippines in 1521.
- 1973: The denomination was not included upon the introduction of the Pilipino series bills. It was later introduced in the Ang Bagong Lipunan series. The banknote adopts the design elements from the demonetized one peso bill; Rizal's profile is featured on the obverse, and on the reverse, it featured the Declaration of the Philippine Independence. The note is predominantly blue in color.
- 1985: The two peso bill was not included when the New Design series was introduced and was later replaced by coins two years before. The banknote was officially demonetized, together with the other Ang Bagong Lipunan series banknotes on February 2, 1996.

=== Version history ===
	English Series (1951–1974)	Ang Bagong Lipunan Series (1973–1996)
Obverse		
Reverse		

== Commemorative issues ==
Throughout its existence, the two peso bill has been overprinted to commemorate certain events:

- Papal visit of Pope John Paul II: In 1981, Bangko Sentral ng Pilipinas issued a commemorative banknote for the visit of Pope John Paul II in the Philippines. The overprint features his coat of arms and around it is "PAGDALAW NG PAPA JUAN PABLO II - PEB 17-22, 1981".

== Printing years ==
Banknote series	Year	President of the Philippines	BSP Governor
English Series	1951–1953	Elpidio Quirino	Miguel Cuaderno Sr.
English Series	1953–1957	Ramon Magsaysay	Miguel Cuaderno Sr.
English Series	1957–1960	Carlos P. Garcia	Miguel Cuaderno Sr.
English Series	1961	Carlos P. Garcia	Andres V. Castillo
English Series	1961–1965	Diosdado P. Macapagal	Andres V. Castillo
Ang Bagong Lipunan Series	1973–1981	Ferdinand E. Marcos	Gregorio S. Licaros
Ang Bagong Lipunan Series	1981–1983	Ferdinand E. Marcos	Jaime C. Laya
