= Philippine one-peso note =

One peso
- Country: Philippines
- Value: 1 peso
- Width: 160 mm
- Height: 66 mm
- Security features: Security fibers, Watermark, Security thread
- Material used: 90% cotton 10% linen
- Years of printing: 1918–1973

Obverse
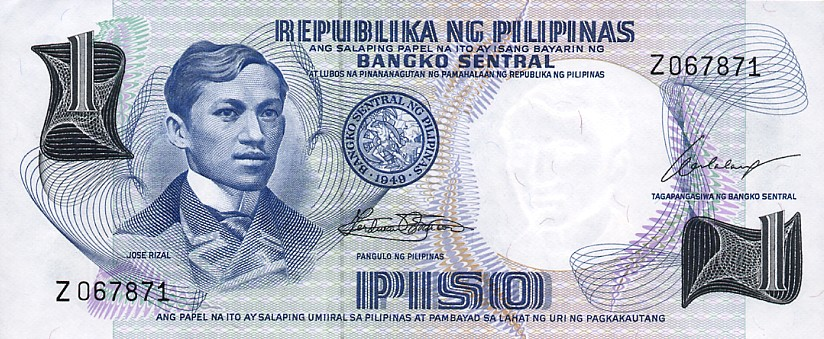
- Design: José Rizal
- Design date: 1969

Reverse
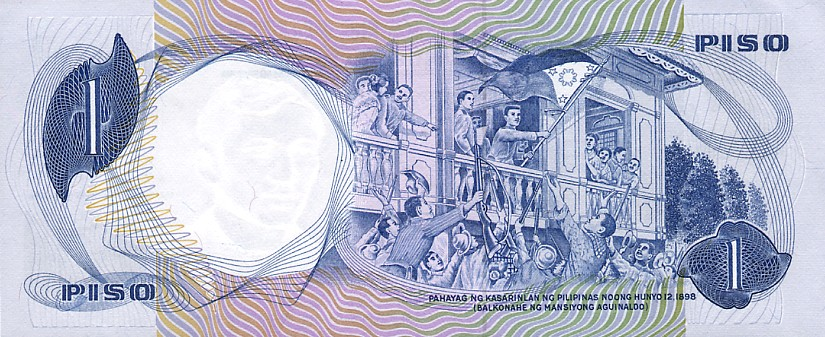
- Design: Declaration of Philippine independence
- Design date: 1969

The Philippine one-peso note (₱1) was a denomination of Philippine currency. On its final release, José Rizal was featured on the front side of the bill, while the Declaration of the Philippine Independence was featured on the reverse side.

This banknote circulated until the Central Bank stopped printing it in 1973. It was replaced by coins upon the introduction of the Ang Bagong Lipunan series.

== History ==
=== Pre-independence ===
- 1918: PNB issued notes. Features a portrait of Charles A. Conant.
- 1918–1929: Philippine Treasury Certificates. Features a portrait of Apolinario Mabini.

	Series of 1918	Series of 1924	Series of 1929
Obverse and Reverse			

- 1944: Philippine commonwealth issues treasury certificates 1-peso bill with the word "victory" on the reverse side
- 1943: Japanese government 1-peso bill.
- 1949: Philippine issued treasury certificates Victory Series Central Bank of the Philippines whoever now all today. "VICTORY, CENTRAL BANK OF THE PHILIPPINES" at back

=== Version history ===
	Philippines (1936-1941)	Victory Series No. 66 (1944)	Victory-CBP Banknote Series (1949)
Obverse			
Reverse			

=== Independence ===
- 1951: English series, Features the portrait of Apolinario Mabini, a political philosopher and revolutionary who wrote a constitutional plan for the first Philippine republic of 1899–1901, and served as its first prime minister in 1899. The reverse features the Barasoain Church, where the drafting of the Malolos Constitution and the inauguration of the First Philippine republic took place. The design elements of this bill will be later adopted for the ten peso bill upon the launch of the Pilipino series notes in 1969.
- 1969: Pilipino series, José Rizal replaced the portrait of Mabini. The note is now predominantly blue in color. On the reverse, it now features the Declaration of the Philippine Independence.
- 1973: The one peso bill was not included when the Ang Bagong Lipunan series was introduced. The banknote was later demonetized together with the English Series and the other Pilipino Series banknotes on February 28, 1974, pursuant to Presidential Decree No. 378.

=== Version history ===
	English Series (1949–1969)	Pilipino Series (1969–1974)
Obverse		
Reverse		

== Gallery ==
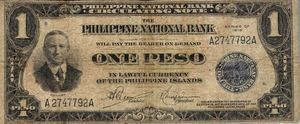
Conant in 1 peso bill (1918).

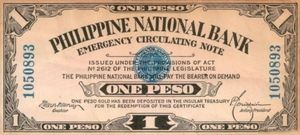
1 Peso 1917.

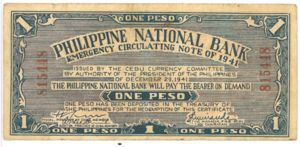
While 1 peso 1941 circulating note is on.

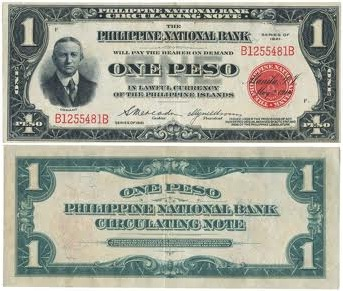
While 1 peso Conant 1921 is on.

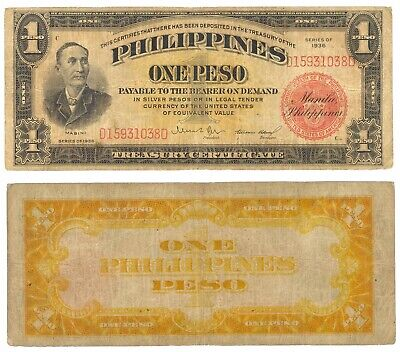
While 1 peso bill was yellow back on 1936.

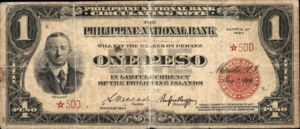
The 1 peso 1924 PNB starnote is on.

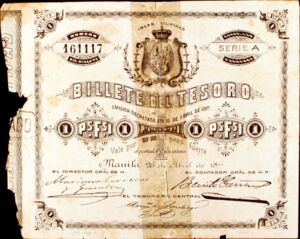
While 1 peso bill Billete del Tesoro was on.

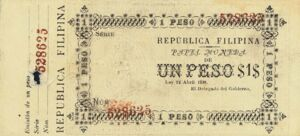
The 1 peso Republica Filipina.

1 peso Negros Occidental Notgeld.

1 peso Negros Oriental Notgeld.

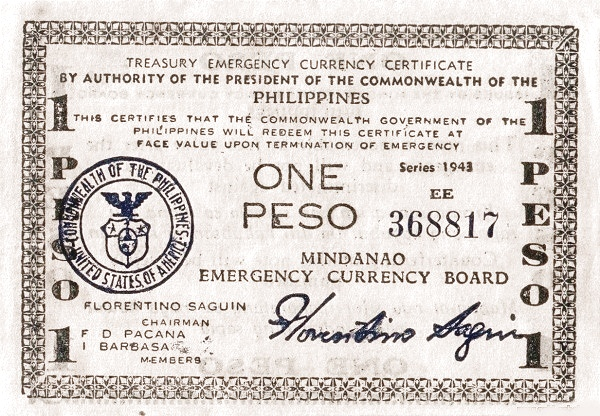
The 1 peso Mindanao Emergency circulating notes.

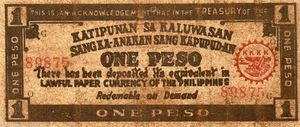
1 Peso KKKK circulating note.

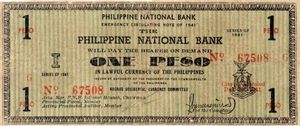
One peso

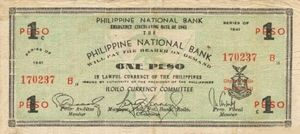
1 peso Iloilo circulating note was on.

== Printing years ==
Banknote series	Year	President of the Philippines	BSP Governor
English Series	1951–1953	Elpidio Quirino	Miguel Cuaderno Sr.
English Series	1953–1957	Ramon Magsaysay	Miguel Cuaderno Sr.
English Series	1957–1960	Carlos P. Garcia	Miguel Cuaderno Sr.
English Series	1961	Carlos P. Garcia	Andres V. Castillo
English Series	1961–1965	Diosdado P. Macapagal	Andres V. Castillo
English Series	1965-1969	Ferdinand E. Marcos	Andres V. Castillo
Pilipino Series	1969–1970	Ferdinand E. Marcos	Alfonso Calalang
Pilipino Series	1970–1973	Ferdinand E. Marcos	Gregorio S. Licaros
