= English Series =

Series of Filipino currency

The English Series were Philippine banknotes and coins that circulated from 1949 to 1969. It was the first banknote and coin series of the newly established Central Bank of the Philippines and was the only banknote and coin series of the Philippine peso to use English as its language for all of its banknotes and coins.

== Banknotes ==
English Series
Image		Value	Dimensions	Main Color		Description		Year	
Obverse	Reverse	Value	Dimensions	Main Color		Obverse	Reverse	First issue	Withdrawal
Small denomination notes
5 centavos	5 centavos	5 centavos	108 mm × 55 mm	Red	Bank title, bank seal, value, serial number	"PHILIPPINES", value	April 15, 1951	June 30, 1958	January 5, 1970
10 centavos	10 centavos	10 centavos	108 mm × 55 mm	Maroon	Bank title, bank seal, value, serial number	"PHILIPPINES", value	April 15, 1951	June 30, 1958	January 5, 1970
20 centavos	20 centavos	20 centavos	108 mm × 55 mm	Green	Bank title, bank seal, value, serial number	"PHILIPPINES", value	April 15, 1951	June 30, 1958	January 5, 1970
		50 centavos	108 mm × 55 mm	Blue	Bank title, bank seal, value, serial number	"PHILIPPINES", value	April 15, 1951	June 30, 1958	January 5, 1970
		1/2 peso	130 mm × 60 mm	Green	Mt. Mayon and three men riding on a carabao-drawn cart	"PHILIPPINES", value	July 1, 1958	February 28, 1969	January 5, 1970
Large denomination notes
1 pesos		₱1	162 mm × 67 mm		Gray	Apolinario Mabini	Barasoain Church	April 15, 1951	February 28, 1974
2 pesos		₱2	162 mm × 67 mm		Blue	José Rizal	Landing of Magellan in the Philippines	April 15, 1951	February 28, 1974
5 pesos	5 pesos	₱5	162 mm × 67 mm		Golden yellow	Marcelo H. del Pilar and Graciano Lopez Jaena	La Solidaridad	April 15, 1951	February 28, 1974
10 pesos		₱10	162 mm × 67 mm		Brown	Fathers Mariano Gomez, Jose Burgos and Jacinto Zamora	Urdaneta and Legaspi Monument	April 15, 1951	February 28, 1974
20 pesos	20 pesos	₱20	162 mm × 67 mm		Orange	Andres Bonifacio and Emilio Jacinto	Cartilla of the Katipunan and the Balintawak Monument	April 15, 1951	February 28, 1974
50 pesos		₱50	162 mm × 67 mm		Red	Antonio Luna	Blood compact between Sikatuna and Legaspi	April 15, 1951	February 28, 1974
100 pesos		₱100	162 mm × 67 mm		Yellow	Tandang Sora	Regimental flags and the veterans	April 15, 1951	February 28, 1974
200 pesos		₱200	162 mm × 67 mm		Green	Manuel L. Quezon	Legislative Building	April 15, 1951	December 31, 1959
500 pesos	500 pesos	₱500	162 mm × 67 mm		Violet	Manuel Roxas	Former Central Bank Building	April 15, 1951	December 31, 1959
For table standards, see the banknote specification table.

== Coins ==
English Series
Image		Face Value	Technical parameters				Description			Total Mintage	Date of	
Obverse	Reverse	Face Value	Diameter	Thickness	Mass	Composition	Edge	Obverse	Reverse	Total Mintage	issue	demonetization
		1¢	19 mm	1.45 mm	3.08 g	Bronze	Plain	Figure of a man seated beside an anvil holding a hammer and Mt. Mayon, year of minting	Bank title and coat of arms	220,000,000	July 1, 1958	August 31, 1979
		5¢	21.0 mm	1.7 mm	1.8 g	Brass	Plain	Figure of a man seated beside an anvil holding a hammer and Mt. Mayon, year of minting	Bank title and coat of arms	260,000,000	July 1, 1958	August 31, 1979
		10¢	17.9 mm	1.19 mm	2.04 g	Nickel-brass	Reeded	Lady Liberty striking an anvil with a hammer and Mt. Mayon, year of minting	Bank title and coat of arms	390,000,000	July 1, 1958	January 2, 1998
		25¢	24 mm	1.6 mm	5 g	Nickel-brass	Reeded	Lady Liberty striking an anvil with a hammer and Mt. Mayon, year of minting	Bank title and coat of arms	199,800,800	July 1, 1958	August 31, 1979
		50¢	30.3 mm		10 g	Nickel-brass	Reeded	Lady Liberty striking an anvil with a hammer and Mt. Mayon, year of minting	Bank title and coat of arms	30,000,000	July 1, 1958	August 31, 1979
