= Inauguration of Joseph Estrada =

1998 Philippine presidential inauguration

- Date: June 30, 1998; 27 years ago
- Location: Barasoain Church Malolos, Bulacan
- Participants: President of the Philippines, Joseph Estrada Assuming office Chief Justice of the Supreme Court of the Philippines, Andres Narvasa Administering oath Vice President of the Philippines; Gloria Macapagal Arroyo Assuming office Chief Justice of the Supreme Court of the Philippines, Andres Narvasa Administering oath Transition Team of Joseph Estrada and Presidential Transition Coordination Team

The inauguration of Joseph Estrada as the thirteenth president of the Philippines took place on Tuesday, June 30, 1998, at the Barasoain Church in Malolos, Bulacan. The oath of office was administered by Chief Justice of the Supreme Court of the Philippines Andres Narvasa. Afterwards, Estrada delivered his inaugural speech at the Quirino Grandstand in Manila. The inauguration was held during the Centennial of Philippine Independence. The Inauguration was organized jointly by the Presidential Transition Cooperation Team of outgoing President Fidel V. Ramos and the Transition Team of incoming President Estrada. This was the last presidential oath administered by Narvasa.

Estrada resigned amidst the Second EDSA Revolution on January 20, 2001, two years, six months, and twenty-one days into his term. The then Vice President Gloria Macapagal Arroyo assumed the office of President.

== Context ==
=== Oath of office ===
Estrada took his oath office on June 30, 1998, at the Barasoain Church in Malolos, Bulacan, and as mandated by the Constitution, this took place at noon. This was the first time in the post-War era that the inauguration took place outside Manila. The Church was chosen to be the venue for the oath taking for paying tribute to the cradle of the First Philippine Republic. The oath of office was administered by Supreme Court Chief Justice Andres Narvasa, who also administered the oath of office of his predecessor, Fidel V. Ramos in 1992.

Ako, si Joseph Ejercito Estrada, ay taimtim na nanunumpa na tutuparin ko nang buong katapatan at sigasig ang aking mga tungkulin bilang Pangulo ng Pilipinas, pangangalagaan at ipagtatanggol ang kanyang Konstitusyon, ipatutupad ang mga batas nito, magiging makatarungan sa bawat tao, at itatalaga ang aking sarili sa paglilingkod sa Bansa. Kasihan nawa ako ng Diyos.

== Inaugural events ==
=== Oath taking ===
As per tradition, the incoming president will fetch the outgoing president at the Malacañan Palace. However, incoming President Joseph Estrada and outgoing President Fidel V. Ramos arrived at the Bulacan State University in Malolos on two separate Presidential choppers. After which, they rode the Presidential Car going to the Bulacan Provincial Capitol. After which, they witnessed a parade on the history of Bulacan. Afterwards, Ramos and Estrada rode a kalesa leading to the Barasoain Church. There, Ramos was given final military honors, after which, they proceeded to the Church. The program started with the Philippine National Anthem and a prayer led by then-Archbishop of Cebu Cardinal Ricardo Vidal followed by a doxology. Vice President-elect Gloria Macapagal Arroyo was sworn in a few minutes prior to Estrada to secure the constitutional line of succession. Her husband Mike Arroyo held the Bible, making it the first time that an incoming Vice President would take his/her oath of office with a Bible. The Bible used by Arroyo was the one used by her father Diosdado, when he took his oath as president exactly 36 years and 6 months earlier. At exactly 12:00 noon PST (GMT+8), Chief Justice Narvasa administered the oath of office to Estrada. Among those who witness the oath-taking were Estrada's mother Mary Ejercito, his wife Loi Ejercito, who held the Bible that Estrada took oath on, his children, Jinggoy (then-Mayor of San Juan, Metro Manila), Jacqueline, Jude and JV (Estrada's son to Guia Gomez), his siblings, and his long-time friend Fernando Poe, Jr. Also witnessed the oath-taking were Ramos and former president Corazon Aquino. Upon signing the presidential oath, Estrada used the pen that was used by Emilio Aguinaldo in signing different decrees while in Hong Kong. After which, Ramos was given departure honors and returned to the Bulacan State University while Estrada on board the Presidential car. Estrada proceeded to the Malacañang Palace in Manila for the ceremonial climbing on the Grand Staircase, the induction of a new cabinet, and his first cabinet meeting.

=== Inauguration ceremony ===
The inaugural ceremony was held at the Quirino Grandstand in Manila, which was hosted by actors Robert Arevalo and Boots Anson-Roa. President Estrada arrived at the Grandstand and given military honors. The inaugural started at around 4:00 p.m. PST with a military and civic parade, followed by the singing of the national anthem by Nora Aunor and the ecumenical prayer. Then, Executive Secretary Ronaldo Zamora introduced President Estrada and gave his inaugural address. In his inaugural address, Estrada said:

One hundred years after Kawit, fifty years after independence, twelve years after Edsa, and seven years after the rejection of foreign bases, it is now the turn of the masses to experience liberation.

== Gallery ==
Oath taking in Malolos, Bulacan

Inaugural address in Manila
