= Flags of the Philippine Revolution =

Katipunan Flags and Meaning

During the Philippine Revolution, various flags were used by the Katipunan secret society and its various factions, and later, after the Katipunan's dissolution, the Philippine Army and its civil government.

Other flags were the personal battle standards of different military zone commanders operating around Manila.

== Flags ==
=== Katipunan ===
Flag	Use	Description
	Organizational flag	With the establishment of the Katipunan, Andrés Bonifacio requested his wife, Gregoria de Jesús, to create a flag for the society. De Jesús devised a simple red flag bearing the society's acronym, KKK, in white and arranged horizontally at the center. It became the society's first flag. Some Katipunan members used other variations. One variation has the three Ks arranged in the form of a triangle. Some others used a red flag with only one K.

==== Personal flags ====
Flag	Bearer	Description
	Andrés Bonifacio	As the Katipunan's Supremo, Andrés Bonifacio had a personal flag which depicts a white sun with an indefinite number of rays on a field of red. Below the sun are three white Ks arranged horizontally. This flag was first unveiled on August 23, 1896, during the Cry of Pugadlawin where the assembled Katipunan members tore their cedulas (community tax certificates) in defiance of Spanish authority. The flag was used later during the Battle of San Juan del Monte on August 30, 1896, the first major battle of the Philippine Revolution.
	Mariano Llanera	General Mariano Llanera who fought in the provinces of Bulacan, Tarlac, Pampanga, and Nueva Ecija used a black flag with a white skull and crossbones, resembling the Jolly Roger. Bonifacio referred to the design as Bungo ni Llanera or Llanera's Skull. There were at least two versions of the flag. The more well-known version had a white K on the left and the white skull and crossbones on the right. An earlier version had the white skull and crossbones on top with three white Ks on the bottom, akin to Bonifacio's flag.
	Pío del Pilar	General Pío del Pilar used a red banner which has a white equilateral triangle on the mast with a K at each corner. At the center of the triangle was a mountain with the sun rising behind it. The flag was called Bandila ng Matagumpay (Flag Of the Triumphants) and was first used on July 11, 1895. The flag was also one of the first to depict an eight-rayed sun.
	Gregorio del Pilar	General Gregorio del Pilar used a tricolor banner with a blue triangle at the mast and a red stripe at the top of the flag and a black stripe at the bottom. Del Pilar patterned his flag after that of Cuba's, which then was also revolting against Spain.

==== Other flags ====
Flag	Description
	Flag used in the Negros Revolution. The flag is inverted with the red part displayed on the top in solidarity with other revolutionaries. This standard in particular was flown by Alipio E. Ykalina who joined General Juan Araneta in consolidating forces south of Bacolod.

=== National flags ===
Flag	Country/Government	Description
	Tagalog Republic	Flag of the Tagalog Republic.
	First Philippine Republic	Flag of the First Philippine Republic. It was formally unfurled during the proclamation of Philippine independence on June 12, 1898 by President Aguinaldo.

== "Evolution of the Philippine Flag" set ==
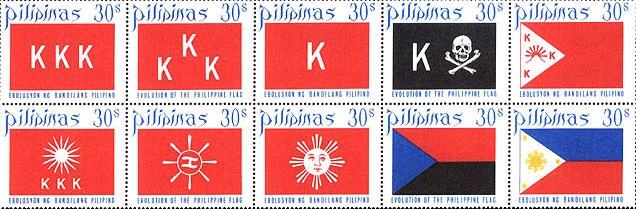
"The Evolution of the Philippine Flag" as featured in a 1972 postal stamp series.

A set of flag purportedly used by the Katipunan, dubbed as the "Evolution of the Philippine", has been featured in postal stamps in the 1972 and the Philippine Centennial. The name of the set erroneously suggest that the modern Flag of the Philippines was derived or "evolved" from the flags used by the Katipunan and all of the flags themselves were national flags. The Manila Historical Institute and the National Historical Institute insist that the flags in the set, excluding the modern Philippine flag, are "Flags of the Philippine Revolution". Historians also questioned the limited number of flags included in the set. It is pointed out that the "Evolution of the Philippine Flag" set only represents a small fraction of flags used by Katipunan battalions. The set also included flags which had limited documentation to support its actual historical usage.

== Modern usage ==
Modern "Magdalo" flag.

A flag reminiscent of the Katipunan flags of the past was used by a breakaway faction of army officers calling themselves Bagong Katipuneros, but labeled the Magdalo Group by the press. These officers mutinied against the government of Gloria Macapagal Arroyo at the behest of Gregorio Honasan and once again led by Antonio Trillanes IV (see Oakwood mutiny and Manila Peninsula mutiny).
