= Gabriel Singson =

Filipino banker (1929–2016)

1st Governor of the Bangko Sentral ng Pilipinas
- In office July 4, 1993 – July 4, 1999
- President: Fidel V. Ramos; Joseph Estrada
- Preceded by: Jose L. Cuisia, Jr. as (Governor of Central Bank of the Philippines)
- Succeeded by: Rafael Buenaventura

Personal details
- Born: 18 March 1929 Lingayen, Pangasinan, Philippine Commonwealth
- Died: 29 March 2016 (aged 87) Manila, Philippines
- Spouse: Moonyeen Singson†
- Children: 3
- Profession: Lawyer, Banker

Gabriel dela Cruz Singson (18 March 1929 – 29 March 2016) was a Filipino lawyer and banker, who served as the first Governor of the Bangko Sentral ng Pilipinas (BSP) from 1993 to 1999. He was the first Governor of the BSP after former President Fidel V. Ramos signed the Republic Act 7653, otherwise known as New Central Bank Act, into law in 1993.

== Early life ==
Singson was born on March 18, 1929, in the town of Lingayen, Pangasinan.

== Career ==
Singson has also served different executive positions of various companies. He was the recipient of the 1998 Management Man of the Year conferred by the Management Association of the Philippines.

== Personal life ==
He was married to Moonyeen Singson with 3 children: Carissa Singson-Mabasa, Gabriel Singson Jr. and Gerard Singson.

== Death ==
He died at the age of 87 on March 29, 2016.
