= Alfonso Calalang =

Governor of the Bangko Sentral ng Pilipinas

Alfonso T. Calalang
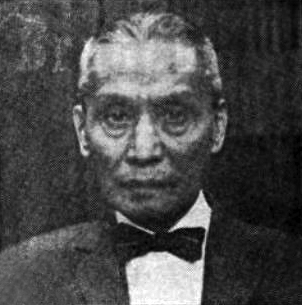

3rd Governor of the Central Bank of the Philippines
- In office January 1, 1968 – January 9, 1970
- President: Ferdinand Marcos
- Preceded by: Andres Castillo
- Succeeded by: Gregorio Licaros

President of the Chamber of Commerce of the Philippine Islands
- In office 1961–1962
- Preceded by: Gaudencio Antonino
- Succeeded by: Hermenegildo Reyes

Personal details
- Profession: Banker

Alfonso Tolentino Calalang was the 3rd Governor of the Central Bank of the Philippines, serving from January 1, 1968, to January 9, 1970. He also served as President of the Chamber of Commerce of the Philippine Islands from 1961 to 1962. Calalang was a member of the Upsilon Sigma Phi fraternity.
