= Rafael Buenaventura =

Philippine central bank governor from 1999 to 2005

Rafael B. Buenaventura
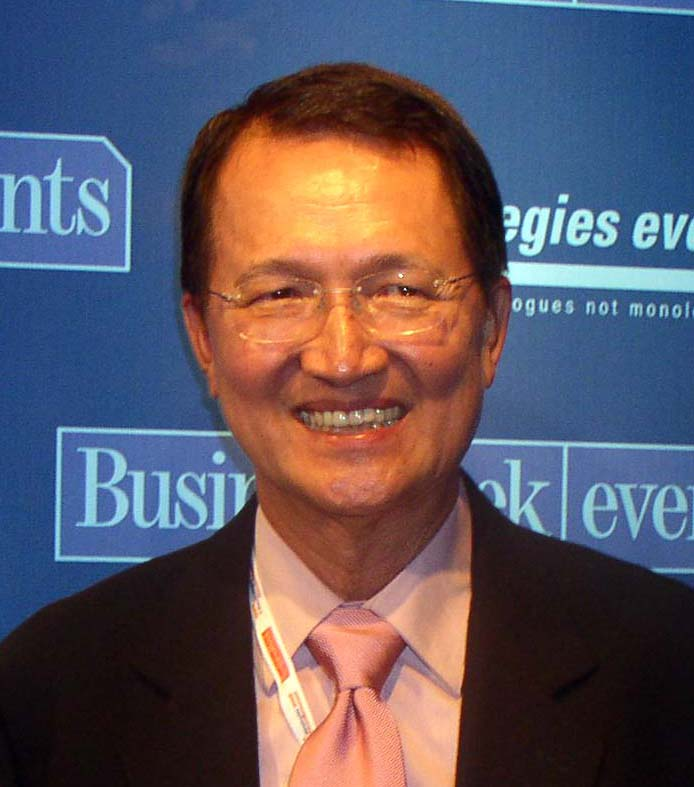
- Rafael Buenaventura, ca. 2004

2nd Governor of the Bangko Sentral ng Pilipinas
- In office July 4, 1999 – July 3, 2005
- President: Joseph Ejercito Estrada; Gloria Macapagal Arroyo
- Deputy: Amando Tetangco, Jr. Armando Suratos
- Preceded by: Gabriel C. Singson
- Succeeded by: Amando Tetangco, Jr.

Personal details
- Born: 5 August 1938 San Fernando, La Union, Philippines
- Died: 30 November 2006 (aged 68) Manila, Philippines
- Cause of death: Cancer
- Education: De La Salle University; New York University
- Profession: Banker
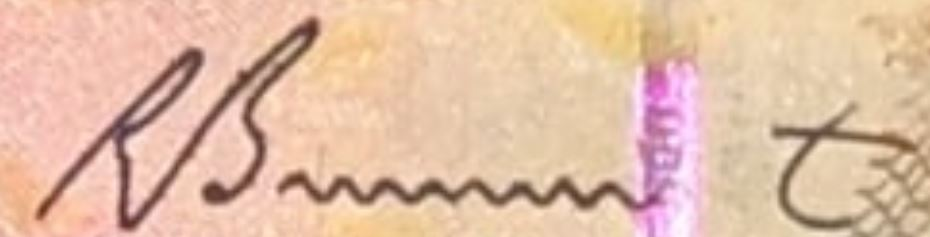
- Signature

Rafael Carlos Baltazar Buenaventura (August 5, 1938 – November 30, 2006) was a prominent banker in the Philippines who served as the second Governor of the Bangko Sentral ng Pilipinas (from 1999 to 2005); he served under two Philippine presidents during one of the most tumultuous political transitions in the country's history.

Known for his fierce independence, Buenaventura was often targeted for removal from public office throughout his six-year term. However, his shrewd handling of both his detractors and supporters allowed him to accomplish key policy reforms at a time when political upheavals often derailed the country's economic progress. By the end of his term as central bank governor, he had managed to steer the financial system closer to global standards.

He died on November 30, 2006, at age 68 following a protracted fight with cancer.

== Background ==
=== Family ===
Fondly called as Paeng by others, he was born to a middle-class family in San Fernando City, La Union, Philippines. His father, Antonio, was regional treasurer for the northern provinces of Luzon. His mother, Consuelo, was a devoted homemaker who also went on to co-found a rural bank in Aringay.

Buenaventura was one of four siblings. His eldest brother, Cesar A. Buenaventura, was former chairman and CEO of Pilipinas Shell, and is a partner at the investment advisory and merchant bank, Buenaventura, Echauz and Associates. His other brother, Jose, is a lawyer and is a senior partner at Romulo Mabanta, Buenaventura, Sayoc and Angeles Law Offices, one of the most prominent law firms in the country. His only sister, Elisa P. Buenaventura is a treasurer and board member of the Asian Social Institute in Manila.

In 1965, Buenaventura married Fairley "Lee" Earl, an American writer whom he had met during his student days in New York City. They had three children (Paul, Deanna, and Melissa) and, at the time of Buenaventura's death, two grandchildren (Pablo and Carlos).

=== Education ===
Born and raised as a Roman Catholic, Buenaventura was educated in Ateneo de Manila, where he completed his secondary education. It was at the Ateneo that Buenaventura met and schooled with the man who would later become president of the country, Jose Marcelo Ejercito, otherwise known as the actor and politician, Joseph Estrada. After completing his high school education, Buenaventura matriculated at the De La Salle College (later De La Salle University-Manila), where he received a bachelor's degree in commerce. He went on to complete a master's degree in business administration at the Stern School of Business of the New York University in the United States.

=== Career ===
Buenaventura, who often described his banking career as “serendipitous”, began as a credit investigator while in his senior year in college, at the Security Bank. Upon graduation, Buenaventura secured a management trainee position at Citibank’s operations in Manila. He rapidly ascended, holding many senior positions in the bank, and was eventually appointed Merchant Bank Head in Citibank's Singapore operations in 1972, just before the declaration of martial law by the late dictator Ferdinand Marcos.

By 1974, Buenaventura had been appointed Citibank Chief Executive in Indonesia. Two years later, in 1976, he was assigned to head the bank's Malaysian operations, also as Chief Executive. He would hold this position until 1979, at which time he was given the post of Senior Vice President and Regional Treasurer in Hong Kong. There, for the next three years, he managed Citibank's treasury activities in twelve countries. In 1982, Buenaventura returned home to become the first Filipino Chief Executive Officer of Citibank Philippines, a position he would hold until the end of his tenure in 1985.

As Chief Executive of Citibank Philippines, Buenaventura had his first serious involvement in macroeconomic planning. In the early 1980s, the Philippines had descended into a debt crisis, and urgently required massive restructuring of its heavy debt burden. A member of the committee of private and government experts that were charged with negotiating the restructuring, Buenaventura played a central role in the crisis' resolution.

After his stint as Citibank chief in the Philippines, Buenaventura next served as Senior Vice President and Division Executive for Southern Europe, responsible for Italy, Spain, Portugal, Greece, and Turkey (1985-1989).

Buenaventura was then tapped by John Gokongwei, chairman of the massive Philippine conglomerate JG Summit Holdings, to head its Philippine Commercial International Bank (PCIB). Buenaventura served as PCIB's president and chief executive officer for ten years; during this time he also served as President of the Bankers Association of the Philippines (1994-1997) and Chairman of the ASEAN Banking Council (1996-1997).

== Governorship of the central bank ==
=== Recruitment ===
In 1998, while Buenaventura was still head of PCIB, his old schoolmate, Joseph Estrada, was elected president of the country. Buenaventura was subsequently asked to head the Bangko Sentral ng Pilipinas (BSP), the Philippine central monetary authority, as central bank governor. The incumbent governor of the BSP, Gabriel C. Singson, had turned in his courtesy resignation, but the financial market was already in turmoil following the outbreak of the Asian financial crisis in 1997. Removing the incumbent central bank chief would have added uncertainty in an already jittery market, so Buenaventura promptly turned down the offer.

Estrada, upon assuming office, opted to allow Singson to serve out the remainder of his six-year term.

Buenaventura was offered various positions in government but politely declined them all until 1999, when Estrada once again offered him the position as BSP chief, in anticipation of Singson's end-of-term departure. Buenaventura would later explain that he and his siblings had made a promise to their late father that none of them would ever work in government. It was only after persistent convincing from Estrada himself and then finance secretary Jose Trinidad Pardo, a close adviser of the president and friend to Buenaventura himself, that Buenaventura was ultimately persuaded to accept the appointment to take over the BSP.

Two months before Singson's term ended, Buenaventura's appointment as central bank governor was announced by Estrada; and when his PCIB contract ended in June that year, he elected not to renew. On July 6, 1999, Buenaventura took over as the second governor of the BSP.

=== Central banking in a time of turmoil ===
The banking industry proved more enthusiastic about Buenaventura's appointment as BSP governor than Buenaventura himself expected. It had good reason: Buenaventura was taking over the position at a time when the industry was in deep trouble, having accumulated a gargantuan portfolio of bad loans that, in the face of the Asian financial crisis, threatened to collapse the entire financial system. Moreover, the industry was on the threshold of increasing globalization, and required radical shifts in regulatory policies in order to comply with global standards. The Enron scandal had happened continents away, but its reverberations in a market already weakened by the 1997 financial crisis necessitated rapid action to plug regulatory loopholes while still allowing the rule of market forces.

By the time Buenaventura became central bank governor, over fifteen percent of the total loan portfolio of the entire banking sector was considered non-performing loans. Within the next year, this peaked at seventeen percent. The need to unload these bad loans before they collapsed the industry spurred the BSP-led lobby for the Special Purpose Vehicles Act, a law that would allow banks to sell their bad loans at a discount to companies that specialized in taking over bad loans and turning them around. Carefully orchestrating the lobby before both houses of Congress, Buenaventura led the efforts for the passage of the law, telling lawmakers that the banking industry needed the flexibility since the government did not have the resources to launch its own rescue efforts.

But the process was halted when Estrada, Buenaventura's primary supporter and appointing power, was booted out of office during EDSA II, a popular uprising occurring in January, 2001. He was soon to be replaced by vice president Gloria Macapagal Arroyo, who was catapulted by the opposition into power as the least offensive standard bearer. Barely two years at the helm of the BSP, Buenaventura had begun to feel pressures for him to resign and make way for an Arroyo-appointed BSP governor.

Although he was not eager to cling to his position in government, Buenaventura nonetheless stated that the stability of a fixed six-year term for a central bank governor was more important than the actual person sitting on the chair. Philippine governance was already under attack from the international community; it was seen not merely as unstable, but downright whimsical, depending on the mood of whoever was wielding the power at any given moment. Buenaventura thus refused to resign, even as a courtesy to the new president. It was at this time that he made public his second career: counting the years, months, weeks, days and minutes to the end of his six-year term.

Through the political turmoil, Buenaventura doggedly persisted with his efforts to relieve the banking sector of its crippling burden of bad loans. Although the transition of power from Estrada to Arroyo interrupted congressional discussions on the issue, the talks eventually resumed, tracking the rescue plan outlined by the BSP and the Bankers Association of the Philippines. Finally, in 2003, congress passed the Special Purpose Vehicles Act, allowing banks to sell their bank loans at a discount and giving them regulatory incentives that made it easier to book the losses.

=== Resolving the FATF crisis ===
The BSP was also faced with another serious problem during Buenaventura's term: the Financial Action Task Force on Money Laundering (FATF) had in June 2000 designated the Philippines as a ‘non-cooperative country’. A spot on the FATF blacklist essentially meant that a country was a prime candidate for the laundering of dirty funds from criminal activities. This translated to higher transaction costs, and often, outright restrictions on the international transactions of Philippine banks to ensure that they did not involve dirty money.

Desperate to avoid formal sanctions and to get off the FATF blacklist, the BSP spearheaded another lobby, this time to legislate a law that would criminalize money-laundering and create an anti-money-laundering body, as required by the FATF. The process, however, proved to be more complicated than anticipated. Buenaventura was repeatedly attacked by irate congressmen, who accused the BSP of attempting to amass power that would allow it to poke into the private accounts of individuals it considered suspicious. Legislators did not want the BSP peeking into private accounts, fearing that such power would be used as a political tool to ferret out ill-gotten wealth that was being laundered through banks.

The debates lasted almost a year, with Buenaventura spending much of his time explaining international anti-money laundering laws and procedures, convincing lawmakers that the Philippines would be merely complying with standards already in use in the rest of the world. Finally, in September 2001 Congress agreed to pass the Anti-Money Laundering Act, which led to the creation of the Anti-Money Laundering Council, a body headed by the BSP and the Securities and Exchange Commission (SEC). Subsequent legislation in 2002 and 2003 implemented and strengthened the AMLA's mechanisms and measures.

As a direct result of these actions, the Philippines was taken off of the FATF blacklist at the start of 2005.

=== Increasing transparency ===
At the time of these two major undertakings, the banking sector itself was also undergoing an upheaval, stemming from the increasing globalization of the financial world. Markets were tolerating less and less secrecy, investors demanded transparency in financial transactions, and they wanted their investments to be as safe and predictable as possible. This provided the momentum for the ongoing global shift towards transparency, good governance and accountability – not just in banking but in business as well.

Seizing upon this opportunity, Buenaventura strongly advocated a regulatory regime that would allow maximum transparency and protection of both banks and their clients. He instituted key policy changes that had the effect of slowly dismantling well-entrenched interests that had until then been out of reach of the regulatory arms of the BSP as bank regulator.

During his term as BSP governor, Buenaventura abolished the controversial and easily abused common trust funds and replaced them with the more transparent and comprehensible unit investment trust funds.

Helped by his deputy governor Alberto Reyes, Buenaventura quietly restructured the banking system to allow more transparency than ever seen before in the history of Philippine banking, and lifted artificial protection from market forces that created artificial profits for financial institutions.

=== An adept, independent style ===
Buenaventura, however, was more publicly known for his adept management of monetary policies, resisting pressure to protect the Philippine peso from market forces through the wanton manipulation of the currency market.

While recognizing the BSP's institutional capabilities, traders saw Buenaventura as "personify[ing] the central bank’s powers of moral suasion," an abstract weapon frequently employed by the BSP in order to keep banks from "straying from the path." He was known to frequently call bank officials into his office and wield this weapon when the peso was under heavy speculative attack.

On more than one occasion, perennial in-fighting within the Arroyo administration fueled rumors that Buenaventura would be booted out of office for his fierce independence and refusal to pander to political interests while pressing for reforms. But his popularity in the local and international business and finance communities made Buenaventura an indispensable thorn in the side of the administration.

In 2003, Bloomberg columnist William Pesek, Jr. commented that the “64-year old Buenaventura has proven to be what the Philippine economy needs most: an adult in the room.”

"He's the guy who has held it all together", said Cezar P. Consing, co-head of investment banking in Asia at J.P. Morgan.

Despite his popularity and record of success as governor, Buenaventura trumpeted years in advance that he had no intentions of accepting any other government position once his fixed term ended at the BSP. After six years, Buenaventura left his office on July 3, 2005, to his deputy, Amando Tetangco, Jr., one of the primary architects of the reforms instituted by his predecessor.

=== International recognition ===
By the time his six-year term ended, Buenaventura had twice (2002, 2003) been named one of the world's top, or "Grade A" central bankers by the New York-based magazine Global Finance, reflecting the results of an annual survey of the world's central bankers based on their performance, effectiveness and general success in wielding monetary tools to steer their country's economy. The elite list included preeminent Australian central bank chief Ian Macfarlane and Poland's Leszek Balcerowicz.

In 2001, Buenaventura was also awarded “Central Bank Governor of the Year for the Asian Region” by The Banker magazine, a sister publication of the Financial Times. He was the first central banker to receive this award from The Banker, as it began an annual awards program for the first time in its 75-year history.

In 2003, BusinessWeek’s sixth annual ‘Stars of Asia’ report chose Buenaventura as one of its five selected financiers, hailing him for maintaining strict economic discipline in the face of financial turmoil.

== See also ==
- Bangko Sentral ng Pilipinas
- Governor of the Bangko Sentral ng Pilipinas

== Notes and references ==
Preceded by Gabriel C. Singson	Governor of the Bangko Sentral ng Pilipinas; 1999–2005	Succeeded by Amando Tetangco, Jr.
