= Andres Castillo =

Andres V. Castillo

2nd Governor of the Central Bank of the Philippines
- In office January 6, 1961 – December 31, 1967
- President: Carlos P. Garcia; Diosdado Macapagal; Ferdinand Marcos
- Preceded by: Miguel Cuaderno, Sr.
- Succeeded by: Alfonso Calalang

Personal details
- Profession: Banker, politician

Andres Castillo was the second Governor of the Central Bank of the Philippines from 1961 to 1967.
