= First Philippine Polymer Series =

Philippine currency issued since 2022

- Country: Philippines
- Value: Piso ng Pilipinas (Filipino)
- Years of printing: 2022–present (₱1000); 2024–present (₱50, ₱100, ₱500)

First Philippine Polymer Series
Demographics
- User(s): Philippines

The First Philippine Polymer (FPP) Series is the name used to refer to the Philippine peso currency series conceptualized in 2009. The series uses the Myriad and Twentieth Century typefaces, the same as the New Generation Currency Series planned from 2007 to its first printing on November 2010.

== History ==
=== 2009: Proposal and delay ===
In 2009, the Philippines' central bank – the Bangko Sentral ng Pilipinas (BSP) has proposed the use of polymer banknotes during the time of then-Governor Amando Tetangco Jr. and President Gloria Macapagal Arroyo, as he announced that will be shifted from paper into polymer substrate, and also the time when the New Design Series was planned to be redesigned for a new banknote series. However, it was delayed the shift plan for 12 years throughout the series' production when the New Generation Currency Series slated to began printing in November 2010 for the release of banknotes made at the said month to public on December 16, 2010, which still using paper substrate made from cotton-abaca fiber and to support local abaca farmers.

=== 2021–present: Final release ===
In 2021, BSP readied the proposal of the release of polymer banknotes during the time of COVID-19 pandemic under the term of then-Governor Benjamin Diokno, which they said that the bacteria and viruses will live shorter on the polymer banknote than the traditional paper one; and the following year, the BSP presented the 1000-piso polymer banknote to President Rodrigo Duterte in Malacañang on April 6, 2022, and released to the public on April 18, 2022, in limited quantities and in trial circulation.

After the trial circulation of 1000-piso polymer banknote in 2022, on December 19, 2024, the BSP released the rest of the banknotes within the First Philippine Polymer Banknote Series with 50-piso, 100-piso, and 500-piso denominations; and it was presented in Malacañang led by President Ferdinand Marcos Jr. and BSP Governor Eli Remolona Jr., and then circulated to the public on December 23, 2024, in limited quantities and in Greater Manila area.

== Design ==
The FPP series shares many design cues with the New Generation Currency Series banknotes, particularly the color scheme, elements on the reverse side, and font used throughout the bills. The difference lies in the material used for the bill, and the main feature designs on the obverse side.

In this series, the BSP has decided not to include 20-piso and 200-piso banknote denominations in the polymer version.

=== 50 piso ===
Colored red, the main design shown on the front of the note depicts a portrait of Visayan leopard cat (Prionailurus bengalensis rabori)^{*} or locally called as maral, and also features the clear window of Vidal's Lanutan flower (Hibiscus campylosiphon). The main designs on the back show Taal Lake, the Giant Trevally (locally known as Maliputo) (Caranx ignobilis) and an embroidery design from Batangas province.

=== 100 piso ===
Colored violet, the main design for this denomination on the front depicts a portrait of Palawan peacock-pheasant (Polyplectron napoleonis) or locally known as tandikan, and also features the clear window of Ceratocentron fesselii orchid flower. The main designs shown on the back feature the Mayon Volcano, the Whale Shark (locally known as Butanding, scientific name Rhincodon typus), and a weave design from Bicol.

=== 500 piso ===
Colored yellow, the main design on the front of the note features the portrait of Visayan spotted deer (Rusa alfredi) or locally known as lagsaw, and also features the clear window of Acanthephippium mantinianum orchid flower. The main designs on the back of the note feature the Subterranean River National Park, the Blue-naped parrot (Tanygnathus lucionensis), and a cloth design from the Southern Philippines.

=== 1,000 piso ===
Colored light-blue, the main designs on the front of the note feature two of the national symbols of the Philippines, the Philippine eagle (Pithecophaga jefferyi), the national bird and the clear window of Sampaguita (Jasminum sambac), the national flower. The main designs on the back of the note feature the Tubbataha Reefs Natural Park, the South Sea Pearl (Pinctada maxima), and a cloth design from the Mindanao design for T'nalak (Ikat-dyed abaca).

== Details of the banknotes (2021–present, printed since 2022 (current) ==
First Philippine Polymer banknote series
Image		Value	Dimensions	Main Color	Design		Year of First Issue	Usage in circulation
Obverse	Reverse	Value	Dimensions	Main Color	Obverse	Reverse	Year of First Issue	Usage in circulation
		₱50	160 mm × 66 mm	Red	Visayan leopard cat (Prionailurus bengalensis rabori)^{*}, Vidal's Lanutan (Hibiscus campylosiphon)	Taal Lake in Batangas; Caranx ignobilis, maliputo (giant trevally); Batangas embroidery design	December 19, 2024	Limited
		₱100	160 mm × 66 mm	Violet (mauve)	Palawan peacock-pheasant (Polyplectron napoleonis), Ceratocentron fesselii orchid	Mayon Volcano in Albay; Rhincodon typus, whale shark (butanding); Bicol textile design	December 19, 2024	Limited
		₱500	160 mm × 66 mm	Yellow	Visayan spotted deer (Rusa alfredi), Acanthephippium mantinianum orchid	Subterranean Underground River in Puerto Princesa, Palawan; Tanygnathus lucionensis, blue-naped parrot; Southern Philippines cloth design	December 19, 2024	Limited
		₱1000	160 mm × 66 mm	Blue	Philippine eagle (Pithecophaga jefferyi), Sampaguita (Jasminum sambac)	Tubbataha Reefs Natural Park in Sulu Sea; Pinctada maxima, South Sea pearl; Mindanao design for T'nalak (Ikat-dyed abaca)	April 6, 2022	Wide
For table standards, see the banknote specification table.

Note

1. The Prionailurus bengalensis rabori was the former scientific name for Visayan leopard cat, and it was revised in 2017 to its new scientific name of Prionailurus sumatranus javanensis.

== Awards and Recognitions ==
The 1000-piso polymer banknote was awarded as the Banknote of the Year for 2022 in the International Banknote Society (IBNS) and also won as the Best New Banknote Award for 2023 in the High Security Printing Asia (HSPA) announced in Colombo, Sri Lanka on December 5, 2023. And meanwhile, this banknote series was awarded as the Best New Banknote or Banknote Series from the International Association of Currency Affairs (IACA) during a ceremony in Bangkok, Thailand on May 28, 2025.
