= Philippine five hundred-peso note =

Philippine currency denomination

Five hundred pesos
- Country: Philippines
- Value: 500
- Width: 160 mm
- Height: 66 mm
- Security features: Security fibers, watermark, see-through registration device, concealed value, security thread, optically variable ink, tactile marks, rolling bar effect
- Material used: 80% cotton 20% abacá fiber, Polypropylene for new plastic notes
- Years of printing: 1903–1953; 1944–1945; 1953–1959; 1985–present

Obverse
- Design: Corazon Aquino, Benigno Aquino Jr., EDSA People Power I, Benigno Aquino Jr. monument
- Designer: Design Systemat
- Design date: 2016

Reverse
- Design: Subterranean River National Park, blue-naped parrot (Tanygnathus lucionensis), Southern Philippines cloth design
- Designer: Design Systemat
- Design date: 2010

The Philippine five hundred-peso note (Filipino: Limandaang Piso) (₱500) is a denomination of Philippine currency. President Corazon Aquino and her husband, Senator Benigno Aquino Jr. are currently featured on the front side of the note, while the Puerto Princesa Subterranean River National Park and the blue-naped parrot are featured on the reverse side.

The polymer version, first introduced on December 19, 2024 features the Visayan spotted deer on its obverse side while its reverse side has similar design elements with the cotton-abacá version and it will be in circulation starting December 23, 2024, in limited quantities and in the Greater Manila area.

== History ==
=== Pre-independence ===
- 1905: Philippine Islands Silver Certificates issued with a portrait of Miguel López de Legazpi.
- 1918: Philippine Treasury Certificates issued with a portrait of Miguel López de Legazpi.
- 1936: Philippine Commonwealth Treasury Certificates issued with a portrait of Miguel López de Legazpi. This series was later overprinted with the word "VICTORY" after the liberation of the Philippines from Japanese rule in 1944.
- 1944: Japanese government issued series. Due to hyperinflation caused by the ongoing World War II, the Japanese were forced to issue higher denominations of their fiat peso. The banknotes ceased to be legal tender after the liberation.

Japanese-sponsored Philippine Republic ₱500 note.

- 1949: Philippine five hundred peso bill VICTORY at Central Bank of the Philippines Banknotes

=== Version history ===
	Philippines (1936-1941)	Victory Series No. 66 (1944)	Victory-CBP Banknote Series (1949)
Obverse			
Reverse			

=== Independence ===
==== English series (1951–1959) ====
From 1953, the obverse side of the denomination featured the portrait of Manuel A. Roxas, the first president of the independent Republic of the Philippines. The reverse side featured the Old Central Bank main office. Roxas and the Central Bank building were later featured on the one hundred peso note upon the introduction of the Pilipino series notes.

In 1959, the 200 and 500 peso notes were withdrawn from circulation on December 31, 1959, pursuant to Philippine Republic Act No. 1516.

==== New Design series (1985–2018) ====
The five hundred peso denomination was not included in the Pilipino and Ang Bagong Lipunan series.

Originally, the ₱500 was scheduled to be reintroduced on late 1985 with New Design Series banknote featuring a portrait of Ferdinand Marcos on the obverse with the Batasang Pambansa Complex (supposed to be symbolizes the site of the unicameral legislature established by the 1973 Constitution) and some of the achievements during his administration depicted on the reverse as the first uncirculated version designed by Romeo Mananquil. The paper color is white instead of mostly yellow, and the Bangko Sentral ng Pilipinas (BSP) logo is black and pink. Before its initial batch of 2 million printed were distributed, Marcos was ousted in the 1986 People Power Revolution. It had the microprint "Central Bank of the Philippines" along the threads above and below with extending to the denomination at lower left, similar to the one thousand and two hundred peso notes (albeit having the text "Bangko Sentral ng Pilipinas" instead) 6 and 17 years later in 1991 and 2002, respectively. The said batch were destroyed in 1986 by administration of President Corazon Aquino resulting from the People Power Revolution, delaying the denomination's release to August 21, 1987. In 2012, a copy of the Marcos ₱500 banknote was discovered in the collection of Wilson Yuloque, which was posted in the blog of Philippine banknote collector Christopher N.C. Gibbs. This would have been the first banknote in the series to feature a sitting president should he not stepped down due to the revolution, before the latter featuring Gloria Macapagal Arroyo along with his immediate predecessor Diosdado Macapagal on a ₱200 banknote. A prototype copy of the banknote is currently displayed at the Museo ng Bangko Sentral ng Pilipinas. The embedded security thread is located beside the signature of the BSP governor and BSP logo, and is broken line, which is also where the security thread will be placed starting with banknotes featuring the signature of President Gloria Macapagal Arroyo on the second circulated Benigno Aquino Jr. version of the banknote in September 20, 2001.

The second version of the note that was finally circulated to the public from 1987 to January 3, 2018, released at the said date of August 1987 and designed by Rafael Asuncion, features the portrait of Benigno Aquino Jr., a former senator and an opposition leader when Ferdinand Marcos was president. The note is predominantly yellow in color. The obverse also features two popular quotes from Aquino: "Faith in our people and faith in God", it is the excerpt from the 1983 undelivered speech upon his return from exile in United States (which is situated above the signature of the President of the Philippines), and "The Filipino is worth dying for", it is the excerpt from his speech delivered before the Asia Society in New York City on August 4, 1980, under which is signed his nickname, "Ninoy". There is also the signature of Aquino, a typewriter with his initials ("B.S.A.J."), and a dove of peace. The reverse features a collage of various images in relation to Aquino, showing him, inter alia, as a journalist for the Manila Times in front of an article about "1st Cav", a senator (the pioneer of the Study Now, Pay Later education program), the mayor of his hometown of Concepcion, the governor of Tarlac, and as the main driving force behind the People Power Revolution of 1986, some three years after his death in 1983. Between the serial number and hidden "500" at the lower-left has the microprint "Central Bank of the Philippines". This is the only note where the name is written in script. Unlike the first uncirculated version with Marcos, the embedded security thread is straight line and located beside the portrait.

After the creation of the "Bangko Sentral ng Pilipinas" in 1993, its new logo was incorporated on all the New Design series bills.

Starting with banknotes printed in 1998, the year of printing was added at the bottom of the denomination value located at the upper left corner of the obverse. The names of the signatories on the bills were later added starting with banknotes featuring the signature of President Joseph Estrada. The names of positions of the respective signatories (Pangulo ng Pilipinas and Tagapangasiwa ng Bangko Sentral) also changed their typeface from Optima to Helvetica and became lowercase.

At the said date of September 2001 starting with banknotes featuring the signature of President Arroyo, additional security features were added, such as the security thread on the right side and the gold fluorescent printing on the left side across the portrait. The security thread was located beside the BSP logo and either over or at the right of the signature of BSP governor depending on its placement and width, the same spot as where the broken line embedded security thread from the uncirculated 1985–1986 Marcos version of the banknote was originally located.

500-Piso New Design Series Banknote Versions
Image		Dimensions	Main Color	Design		Year of First Issue	Usage in circulation
Obverse	Reverse	Dimensions	Main Color	Obverse	Reverse	Year of First Issue	Usage in circulation
		160 mm × 66 mm	White, Sky Blue, Brown, Orange, Green, Pink, Grey, and Black	Ferdinand E. Marcos, 1981–1986 Seal of the President of the Philippines, narra tree, basi, bundles of harvested rice stalks, indigenous weave design pattern from Ilocos region (Inabel)	Batasang Pambansa Complex, seal of the president of the Philippines (Marcos era), Some accomplishments of the Marcos administration especially during the New Society era (e.g. San Juanico Bridge, Angat Dam, BLISS Housing Project, Green Revolution agriculture)	1985 (scheduled)	2 million notes printed but not circulated upon destruction in 1986
		160 mm × 66 mm	Yellow, Brown, Blue, Grey, and Black	Benigno S. Aquino Jr., BSAJ typewriter, His quotations of The Filipino is worth dying for and his signature Ninoy	Aquino as a journalist for the Manila Times holding a Rolleiflex camera (in front of an article about "1st Cav" and the Partition of Korea), Study Now, Pay Later education program, Concepcion, Tarlac town hall, Tarlac Provincial Capitol, 1986 People Power Revolution.	August 21, 1987	Demonetized on January 3, 2018
For table standards, see the banknote specification table.

Concept designs of the New Design ₱500 note, with Benigno Aquino Jr. featured on the left and Ferdinand Marcos on the right, displayed at the Bangko Sentral ng Pilipinas museum.

The original artwork of Angel C. Cacnio's proposed Ninoy Aquino design of the ₱500 note.

==== New Generation series (2010–present) ====
From 2010 onwards, the portrait of Benigno Aquino Jr. was redesigned and a portrait of his wife, former president Corazon Aquino, was added. A scene from the EDSA Revolution was added on the lower left of the obverse and the Ninoy Aquino Monument was added in the lower middle. The reverse now features the Puerto Princesa Subterranean River National Park and the blue-naped parrot.

In 2017, an updated version of the New Generation series 500 peso banknote was issued with changes in the font size of the year of issue and the italicization of the scientific name on the reverse side.

In 2020, an enhanced version of the 500 peso banknote was released. It added color-changing indigenous patterns to the security threads. A Rolling bar effect was also added in the 500 located at the upper-left corner. Finally, eight tactile marks were placed for the elderly and the visually impaired, four tactile marks were placed on the extreme left and right side of the front of the note.

The new BSP logo, which was redesigned in January 2021 was adopted in all NGC banknotes starting with the 2022 issued banknotes featuring the signatures of President Ferdinand Marcos Jr. and BSP Governor Felipe Medalla.

=== Version history ===
	English Series (1951–1959)	New Design/BSP Series (1985–2018)	New Generation Currency Series (2010–present)
Obverse			
Reverse			

==== First Philippine Polymer series (2024–present) ====
500-Piso First Philippine Polymer series banknote
Image		Dimensions	Main Color	Design		Year of First Issue	Usage in circulation
Obverse	Reverse	Dimensions	Main Color	Obverse	Reverse	Year of First Issue	Usage in circulation
		160 mm × 66 mm	Yellow	Visayan spotted deer (Rusa alfredi), Acanthephippium mantinianum orchid	Subterranean Underground River in Puerto Princesa, Palawan; Tanygnathus lucionensis, blue-naped parrot; Southern Philippines cloth design	December 19, 2024	In limited circulation
For table standards, see the banknote specification table.

== Commemorative issues ==
The 500-peso bill has sometimes been overprinted to commemorate certain events.

=== 60 years of Central Banking Commemorative Banknote ===
On July 9, 2009, the Bangko Sentral ng Pilipinas introduced 12 million banknotes (2 million banknotes for each denomination) with an overprint commemorating 60 years of central banking. The overprint appears on the watermark area on all six circulating denominations.

=== 45th Annual Meeting of the Asian Development Bank (May 2–5, 2012) Commemorative Banknote ===
A total of 10 million banknotes with the commemorative overprint were released by the Bangko Sentral ng Pilipinas to the general public to commemorate the Asian Development Bank's recent meetings.

== Printing years ==
Banknote series	Year	President of the Philippines	BSP Governor
English Series	1951	Elpidio Quirino	Miguel Cuaderno Sr.
New Design Series
New Design Series	1985–1986 (unused)	Ferdinand E. Marcos	Jose B. Fernandez Jr.
New Design Series	1987–1990	Corazon C. Aquino	Jose B. Fernandez Jr.
New Design Series	1990–1992	Corazon C. Aquino	Jose L. Cuisia Jr.
New Design Series	1992–1993	Fidel V. Ramos	Jose L. Cuisia Jr.
New Design Series	1993–1998	Fidel V. Ramos	Gabriel C. Singson
New Design Series	1998–1999	Joseph Estrada	Gabriel C. Singson
New Design Series	1999–2001	Joseph Estrada	Rafael B. Buenaventura
New Design Series	2001–2005	Gloria Macapagal Arroyo	Rafael B. Buenaventura
New Design Series	2005–2010	Gloria Macapagal Arroyo	Amando M. Tetangco Jr.
New Design Series	2010–2013	Benigno S. Aquino III	Amando M. Tetangco Jr.
New Generation Currency Series	2010–2016	Benigno S. Aquino III	Amando M. Tetangco Jr.
New Generation Currency Series	2016–2017	Rodrigo Duterte	Amando M. Tetangco Jr.
New Generation Currency Series	2017–2019	Rodrigo Duterte	Nestor Espenilla Jr.
New Generation Currency Series	2019–2022	Rodrigo Duterte	Benjamin E. Diokno
New Generation Currency Series	2022–2023	Bongbong Marcos	Felipe M. Medalla
New Generation Currency Series	2024–present	Bongbong Marcos	Eli M. Remolona Jr.
First Philippine Polymer Series	2024–present	Bongbong Marcos	Eli M. Remolona Jr.
