= Philippine one thousand-peso note =

Currency denomination

One thousand pesos
- Country: Philippines
- Value: ₱1000
- Width: 160 mm
- Height: 66 mm
- Security features: Security fibers, watermark, see-through registration device, concealed value, 3D security thread, optical variable device, optically variable ink, tactile marks, rolling bar effect
- Material used: 80% cotton 20% abacá fiber
- Years of printing: 1944–1945; 1991–present

Obverse
- Design: José Abad Santos, Vicente Lim, Josefa Llanes Escoda, Centennial celebration of Philippine independence
- Designer: Studio 5 Designs
- Design date: 2022

Reverse
- Design: Tubbataha Reefs Natural Park, South Sea pearl (Pinctada maxima), Mindanao design for T'nalak (Ikat-dyed abaca)
- Designer: Studio 5 Designs
- Design date: 2022

The Philippine one thousand-peso note (Filipino: Sanlibong Piso) (₱1000; PHP1000) is a denomination of Philippine currency. It is the largest denomination in general circulation in the Philippines. It was the first Philippine peso denomination to have a polymer banknote version until it was implemented on other denominations on December 19, 2024.

The cotton-abaca version, features José Abad Santos, Vicente Lim, and Josefa Llanes Escoda on the front side of the notes, while the Tubbataha Reefs Natural Park and the South Sea pearl are featured on the back side of the note.

The polymer version, first issued on April 6, 2022, features the Philippine eagle on its obverse side while its reverse side has similar design elements with the cotton-abacá version.

== History ==
=== Pre-independence ===
==== Japanese government issued series ====
Due to hyperinflation caused by the ongoing event of World War II, the Japanese were forced to issue higher denominations of their fiat peso. The banknotes ceased becoming legal tender after the liberation.

=== Independence ===
==== New Design series (1991–2018) ====
The Bangko Sentral ng Pilipinas (BSP) introduced the one thousand peso denomination in December 7, 1991 during the presidency of Corazon Aquino and tenure of BSP Governor Jose L. Cuisia Jr. The note features the portraits of former Chief Justice José Abad Santos; Josefa Llanes Escoda, civic worker and one of the founders of the Girl Scouts of the Philippines; and Vicente Lim, a general in the Philippine Army who was the first Filipino graduate of West Point. The three are considered heroes of the resistance against the Japanese occupation of the Philippines during World War II. The obverse also features the eternal flame at the Libingan ng mga Bayani and laurel wreath. The note is predominantly blue in color. The reverse features the Banaue Rice Terraces, Manunggul Jar cover, and Langgal (a mosque), representing Luzon (Ifugao and Palawan) and Mindanao (Sulu), respectively. This is also the only note for the series that uses optically variable ink. (OVI) At the lower left beside the OVI has the microprint "Central Bank of the Philippines". The banknote was designed by Romeo Mananquil.

After the creation of the Bangko Sentral ng Pilipinas, its new logo was incorporated on all the New Design series bills in 1993.

Starting with banknotes printed in 1998, the year of printing was added at the bottom of the denomination value located at the upper left corner of the obverse.

In 1999, the signature of the Philippine president was moved slightly to the left to accommodate the names of the signatories on the bills and added them starting with banknotes featuring the signature of President Joseph Estrada.

On July 3, 2001, additional security features were added, such as the optically variable ink used for the "1000" on the lower left side of the obverse. Other features that were added are the security thread on the right side and the fluorescent printing on the left side across the portrait. To deplete the BSP's inventory of cotton-linen banknote paper, the first 500,000 banknotes featuring the signature of President Gloria Macapagal Arroyo on the said date of July 2001 do not have the said second and third features mentioned before which makes the only banknote with the 2001 year mark to not feature the signature of President Joseph Estrada.

1000-Piso New Design Currency Banknote
Image		Dimensions	Main Color	Design		Year of First Issue	Usage in circulation
Obverse	Reverse	Dimensions	Main Color	Obverse	Reverse	Year of First Issue	Usage in circulation
		160 mm × 66 mm	Blue	Portraits of Jose Abad Santos, Vicente Lim and Josefa Llanes Escoda, The Eternal Flame and Laurel Leaves (Bay leaf)	Banaue Rice Terraces, Manunggul Jar cover and Langgal (mosque)	December 7, 1991	Demonetized on January 3, 2018
For table standards, see the banknote specification table.

==== New Generation Currency series (2010–present) ====
The portraits of Abad Santos, Escoda, and Lim were revised, and a scene from the Centennial celebration of Philippine independence was added on the lower left and an image of the Order of Lakandula medal (mislabeled as the "Medal of Honor") in the lower middle. The reverse now features the Tubbataha Reefs Natural Park and the South Sea pearl.

In 2017, an updated version of the 1000-peso banknote was released with changes in the font size of the year of issue and the italicization of the scientific name on the reverse side. The image of the Order of Lakandula and its description on the front side of the note were also removed.

In 2020, an enhanced version of the 1000 peso "New Generation Currency" banknote was released. Four notable changes were made. First, it added color-changing indigenous patterns to the security threads. Second, a rolling bar effect was also added in the 1000 located at the upper-left corner. Third, the 1000 number located at the bottom-left were added with a color-changing feature depending on what angle it is tilted. Finally, ten tactile marks were placed for the elderly and the visually impaired, five tactile marks were placed on the extreme left and right side of the front of the note.

The new BSP logo which was redesigned in January 2021 was adopted in all NGC banknotes starting with the 2022 issued banknotes featuring the signatures of President Bongbong Marcos and BSP Governor Felipe Medalla.

==== First Philippine Polymer series (2022–present) ====
In mid-2021, the Bangko Sentral ng Pilipinas announced that new polymer bills featuring the flora and fauna of the country will be in circulation. The portraits of Escoda, Abad Santos and Lim were replaced by a portrait of a Philippine Eagle. Reactions to the design were mixed, with the descendants of Escoda, Abad Santos, and Lim all criticizing the decision as disrespectful to their memory and urging the BSP to retain the three portraits in the new bill. Other critics viewed the redesign as the first step in the removal of the portraits of Ninoy and Corazon Aquino on the 500-peso bill. Despite these criticisms, the new polymer design would win the Banknote of the Year award by the International Banknote Society, a global non-profit organization, in 2022.

The new design of the 1000-peso bill would later be adopted for the 50-peso, 100-peso, and 500-peso bills as part of the First Philippine polymer series, which was unveiled in December 2024. Each bill also featured a different set of species, also replacing the images of Philippine heroes, which continues to be criticized by civil groups.

1000-Piso First Philippine Polymer series banknote
Image		Dimensions	Main Color	Design		Year of First Issue	Usage in circulation
Obverse	Reverse	Dimensions	Main Color	Obverse	Reverse	Year of First Issue	Usage in circulation
		160 mm × 66 mm	Blue	Philippine eagle (Pithecophaga jefferyi), Sampaguita (Jasminum sambac)	Tubbataha Reefs Natural Park in Sulu Sea; Pinctada maxima, South Sea pearl; Mindanao design for T'nalak (Ikat-dyed abaca)	April 6, 2022	Wide
For table standards, see the banknote specification table.

== Commemorative issues ==
Throughout its existence, the one thousand peso bill have been overprinted to commemorate certain events, namely:

=== 60 years of Central Banking commemorative bill ===
On July 9, 2009, the Bangko Sentral ng Pilipinas introduced 12 million banknotes (2 million banknotes for each denomination) with an overprint commemorating 60 years of central banking. The overprint appears on the watermark area on all six circulating denominations.

== Printing years ==
Banknote series	Year	President of the Philippines	BSP Governor
New Design Series	1991–1992	Corazon C. Aquino	Jose L. Cuisia Jr.
New Design Series	1992–1993	Fidel V. Ramos	Jose L. Cuisia Jr.
New Design Series	1993–1998	Fidel V. Ramos	Gabriel C. Singson
New Design Series	1998–1999	Joseph Estrada	Gabriel C. Singson
New Design Series	1999–2000	Joseph Estrada	Rafael B. Buenaventura
New Design Series	2001–2004	Gloria Macapagal Arroyo	Rafael B. Buenaventura
New Design Series	2005–2010	Gloria Macapagal Arroyo	Amando M. Tetangco Jr.
New Design Series	2010–2012	Benigno S. Aquino III	Amando M. Tetangco Jr.
New Generation Currency Series	2010–2016	Benigno S. Aquino III	Amando M. Tetangco Jr.
New Generation Currency Series	2016–2017	Rodrigo Duterte	Amando M. Tetangco Jr.
New Generation Currency Series	2017–2019	Rodrigo Duterte	Nestor Espenilla Jr.
New Generation Currency Series	2019–2022	Rodrigo Duterte	Benjamin E. Diokno
New Generation Currency Series	2022–2023	Bongbong Marcos	Felipe M. Medalla
New Generation Currency Series	2024–present	Bongbong Marcos	Eli M. Remolona Jr.
First Philippine Polymer Series	2022	Rodrigo Duterte	Benjamin E. Diokno
First Philippine Polymer Series	2022–2023	Bongbong Marcos	Felipe M. Medalla
First Philippine Polymer Series	2024–present	Bongbong Marcos	Eli M. Remolona Jr.
