= Philippine Centennial =

Series of celebrations about Philippine independence

Centennial of the Proclamation of Philippine Independence
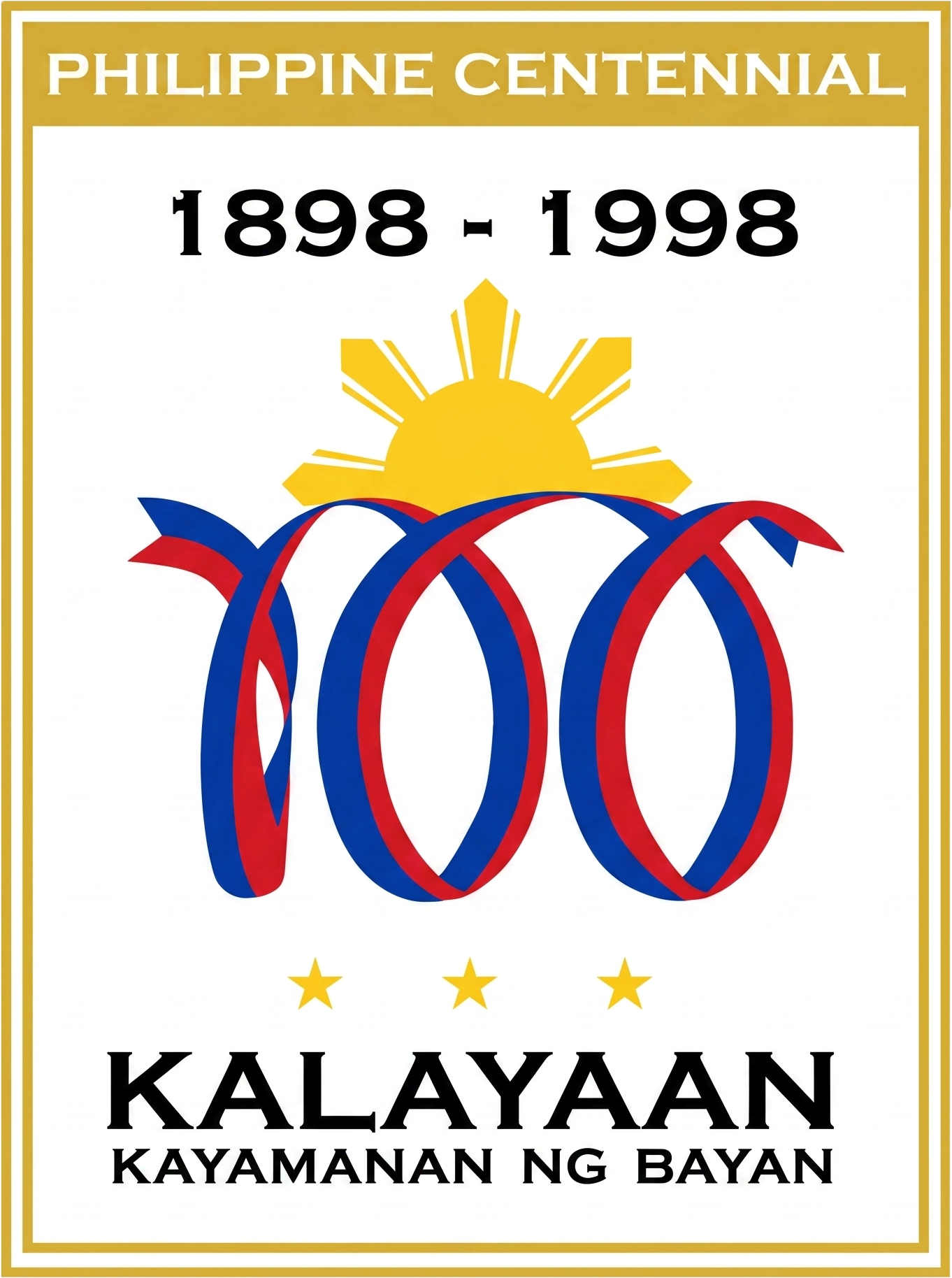
- Logo
- Date: 1998
- Location: Primarily in the Philippines (some events held outside the country)
- Type: Series of commemorations
- Organized by: National Centennial Commission
- Slogan: "Kalayaan, Kayamanan ng Bayan" (transl. Freedom, Wealth of the Nation)
- Website: www.philcentennial.com (archived)

The Philippine Centennial was a series of celebrations by the Philippine government to primarily celebrate 100 years of the proclamation of Philippine Independence on June 12, 1898.

== Background ==
The Philippine Centennial primarily celebrates the 100th year of the Philippine Declaration of Independence on June 12, 1898. It also commemorates other events in the Philippine Revolution and the earlier part of the Philippine-American war including the execution of José Rizal (1896), the Cry of Pugad Lawin, the death of Andres Bonifacio, the exile of Emilio Aguinaldo in 1897 (See Hong Kong Junta), the Capture of Malolos, the death of Antonio Luna, and the Battle of Tirad Pass. The Philippine Centennial culminates with the 100th year of the ratification of the Malolos Constitution on September 15, 1898, that led to the establishment of the First Republic on January 23, 1899.

== Organization ==
The implementation of the Philippine Centennial is largely overseen by the administration of President Fidel V. Ramos. It was part of Ramos' program Philippines 2000 which envisions the Philippines as a newly industrialized country by the year 2000.

The government body which organized the centennial was the National Centennial Commission (NCC). The NCC was established as the Committee for the National Centennial Celebrations on June 13, 1991, through Administrative Order No. 223 issued by President Corazon Aquino. The same order also mandates that the composition of the committee shall include 11 representatives; six from the Presidential Commission for Culture and the Arts (PCCA), and five from the Philippine Centennial Foundation, Inc. (PCFI). President Fidel V. Ramos later renamed the committee as the National Centennial Commission through Executive Order No. 128. It also expanded the committee to include certain government officials including Cabinet secretaries and former Vice President Salvador Laurel.

The conduct of the centennial had the following goals:

- Revive love of country;
- Restore appreciation for the true Filipino identity
- Relearn the values of the country's historic struggle for independence and use these for the development of the future
- Generate greater and active participation in centennial commemorative celebration to accelerate nation-building

== Marketing ==
=== Memorabilia ===
A commemorative ₱100,000 banknote was issued as part of the centennial celebrations in 1998. The banknote is the highest ever currency denomination issued by the Bangko Sentral ng Pilipinas, the Philippines' central bank. In December 1998, another Centennial commemorative banknote were issued by the BSP, the 2,000-Piso Banknote and they issued for the limited amount of 300,000 pieces.

From 1997 to 1998, BSP released one-hundred peso banknote featuring the Philippine Centennial logo at the watermark area. The version without the year of issue was released in 1997, while those with a year of issue was released in 1998. A scene of the centennial celebration is also featured in the New Generation Currency (NGC) one-thousand peso banknote since 2010.

=== Branding ===
The logo for the Philippine Centennial was the winning entry of a national design competition which had 5,000 submissions. The logo designed by Edgardo Santiago featured a rising sun above a blue and red ribbon which twirls to form the number "100". The logo contains the centennial's slogan "Kalayaan, Kayamanan ng Bayan" (transl. Freedom, Wealth of the Nation) which presents the concept that "freedom" is the wealth of the country, the said slogan was won by Joachim Medroso on the said competition.

Aklanon songwriter-composer Dante Beriong composed the Philippine Centennial theme song, "Mabuhay Ka Pilipino". The song was also performed by the several OPM artists on The ABS-CBN Worldwide Celebration of the New Millennium in December 31, 1999.

== Expo Pilipino ==
The Philippine National Centennial Exposition, a world's fair featuring the Philippines' culture and history was held as part of the commemorations. The site of the exhibition was built at the Clark Special Economic Zone in Pampanga.

The project for the exhibition's facilities was riddled with graft and bidding irregularities. President Fidel V. Ramos as a result was implicated in a political scandal, which was known as the Expo scam.

== National flag and observances ==
Flag of the Philippines

Flag from 1946–1985, 1986–1998

Flag adopted in 1998

The shade of blue of the Flag of the Philippines has been a subject of debate by historians. American blue (navy blue) has been used for the flag prior to 1998, with a lighter blue (Oriental blue) used briefly during the presidency of Ferdinand Marcos from 1985 to 1986. Royal Blue was codified as the official shade of blue of the Philippine flag in 1998 through Republic Act No. 8491 signed on February 12, 1998.

President Fidel V. Ramos issued Executive Order No 179 in 1994 which mandates the observance of National Flag Days from May 28 to June 12 every year. All establishments are therefore obliged to display the Philippine flag from sunrise to sunset on those dates. May 28 marks the date of the Battle of Alapan in Imus, Cavite when the Philippine flag was believed to have been first unfurled.

== Infrastructure projects ==
Infrastructure projects were implemented as part of the Philippine Centennial. The Old Legislative Building in Manila which used to host the Senate of the Philippines was renovated and converted to a museum – now known as the National Museum of Fine Arts. The Libingan ng mga Bayani was likewise renovated in 1998.

There was a plan to build a supertall structure as part of the commemorations. The proposed structure was the 390 meters (1,280 ft) Centennial Tower which was designed by Filipino architect Francisco Mañosa. The project, which was proposed to be built at the Luneta Park, was met with controversy due to its scale and planned site. The tower was never built.

== See also ==
- 2021 Quincentennial Commemorations in the Philippines
- Philippine Centennial Team
