= Philippine fifty-peso note =

Currency in the Philippines

Fifty pesos
- Country: Philippines
- Value: ₱50
- Width: 160 mm
- Height: 66 mm
- Security features: Transparent windows with Republika ng Pilipinas crest of arms and the Bangko Sentral ng Pilipinas emblem in white, embossed eagle, mirrored denomination, another transparent window with the shape of Vidal's Lanutan, a type of hibiscus (hibiscus campylosiphon) in it, raised ink (intaglio) printing
- Material used: Polypropylene
- Years of printing: 1852–present

Obverse
- Design: Visayan leopard cat,Vidal's Lanutan
- Designer: Bangko Sentral ng Pilipinas in collaboration with Note Printing Australia
- Design date: 2024

Reverse
- Design: Taal Lake, Giant Trevally (Maliputo) (Caranx ignobilis), Batangas weave design
- Designer: Bangko Sentral ng Pilipinas in collaboration with Note Printing Australia. It was slightly from the original cotton-abaca fiber version to accommodate window security features. Original art for the cotton-abaca fiber version, still here in the Polymer Series, is from Design Systemat.
- Design date: 2017. It was slightly edited in 2024 by the Bangko Sentral ng Pilipinas to accommodate window security features.

The Philippine fifty-peso note (Filipino: Limampung piso (formal), singkuwenta pesos (Vernacular)) (₱50) is a denomination of Philippine currency. The currently issued polymer version, first introduced in December 19, 2024, features the Visayan leopard cat on its obverse side while its reverse side has similar design elements with the cotton-abacá version and started circulation run around December 19, 2024 in limited quantities and in the Greater Manila area.

On the slightly older and more circulated/known New Generation Currency Series, still legal tender as of 2026, and made with cotton-abacá paper, is Philippine president and former House Speaker Sergio Osmeña on the front side of the bill, while the Taal Lake and the giant trevally (known locally as maliputo) are featured on the reverse side, like in the current polymer version.

== History ==
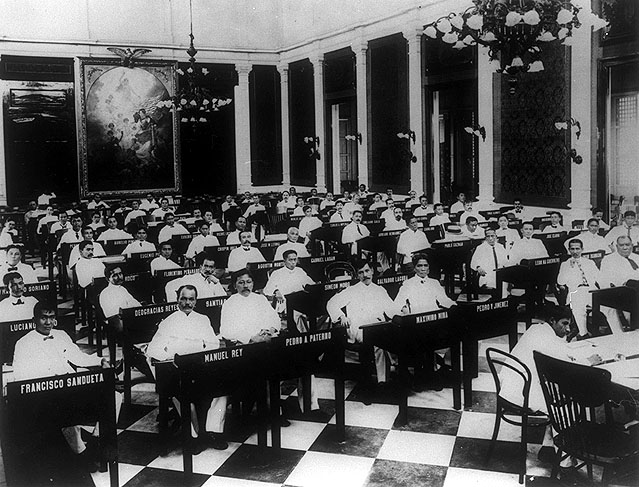
This photo of the Philippine Legislature was used for the New Generation Currency ₱50 note and is from the U.S. Library of Congress.

=== Pre-independence ===
- 1852: Banco Español Filipino De Isabel II (present-day Bank of the Philippine Islands) issued notes, features María Isabel Luisa de Borbón y Borbón-Dos Sicilias.
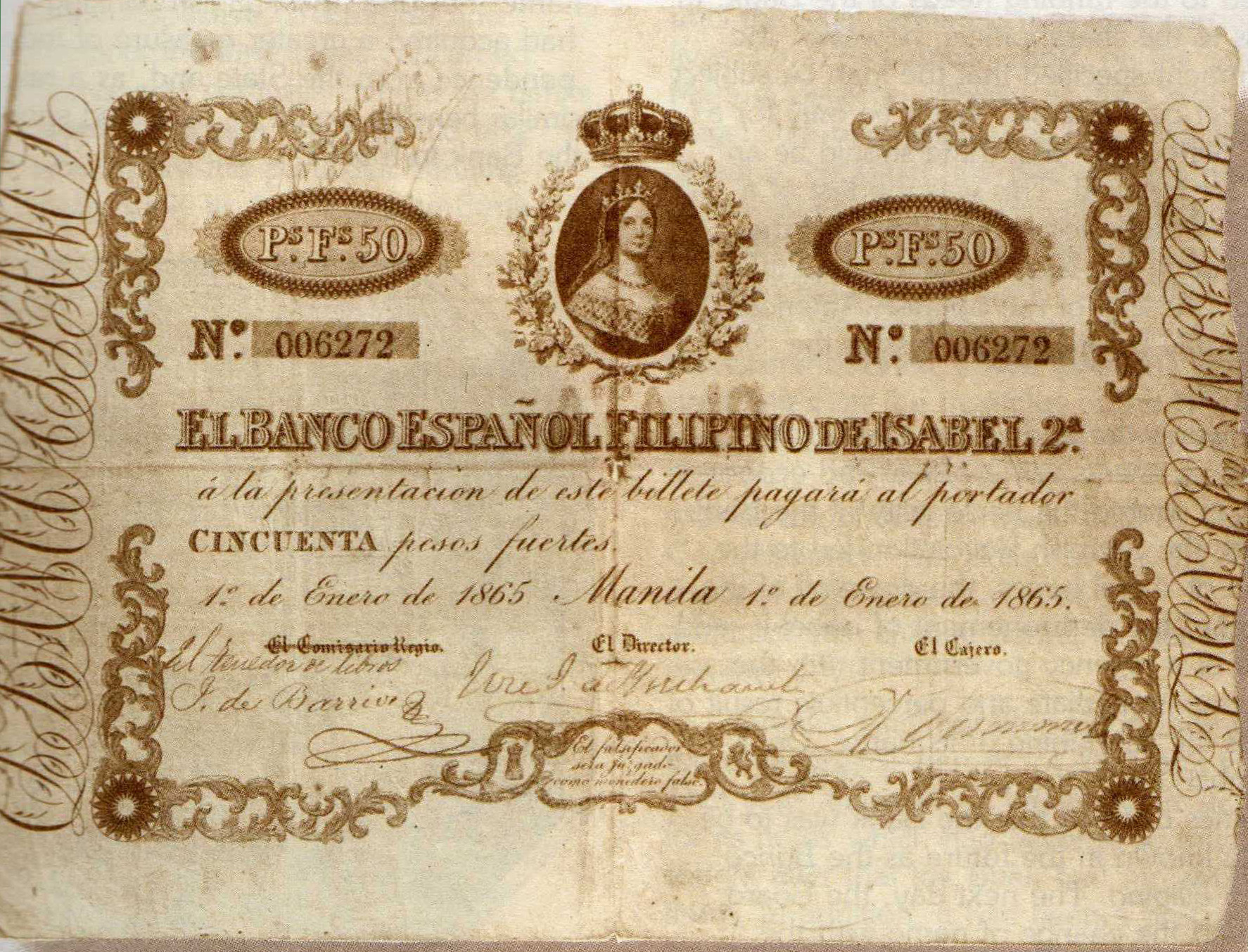
Obverse

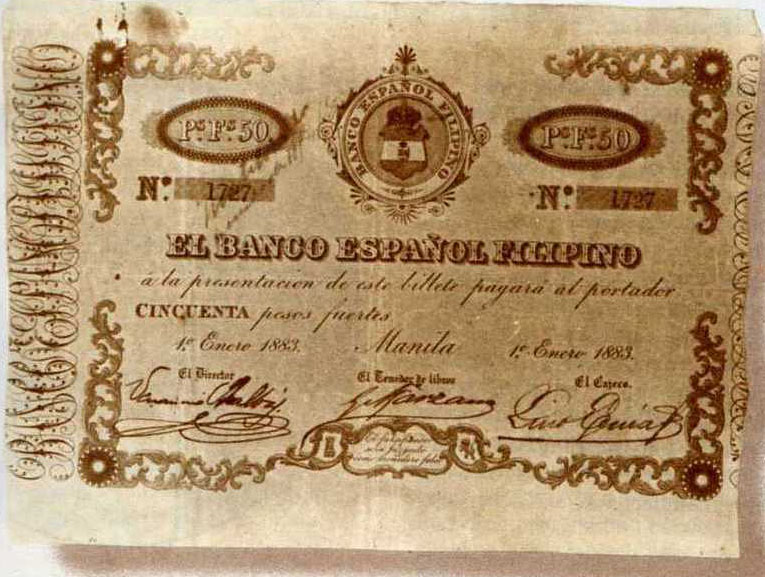
Reverse
- 1908: Banco Español Filipino (Printed by US BEP)
- 1912 and 1928: Bank of the Philippine Islands (Printed by US BEP)
- 1905 and 1916: Philippine Islands Silver Certificates issued with a portrait of Henry Ware Lawton. (Printed by US BEP)
- 1920: Philippine National Bank Circulating Note. (Printed by US BEP). This note was never officially issued by the Philippine National Bank. 10,000 pieces were captured and issued during World War II by the Japanese. The others were looted by Moros in the Province of Mindanao who sold them at tenth of their face value.
- 1918 and 1929: Philippine Islands Treasury Certificates issued with a portrait of Henry Ware Lawton.
- 1936 and 1944: Philippine Commonwealth issued Treasury Certificates. (Printed by US BEP). With a portrait of Henry Ware Lawton. The 1944 (Series No. 66) banknotes had a blue seal and were later overprinted with the word "VICTORY" after the liberation of the Philippines from Japanese rule in 1944.
- 1949: 50 Peso Bill issues treasury certificates overprinted with the word "VICTORY, CENTRAL BANK OF THE PHILIPPINES".

=== Version history ===
	Philippines (1936-1941)	Victory Series No. 66 (1944)	Victory-CBP Banknote Series (1949)
Obverse			
Reverse			

=== Independence ===
Osmeña first appeared on the fifty peso note upon the release of the Pilipino series notes in 1967.

==== English series (1951–1974) ====
The obverse features the portrait of Antonio Luna, a general in the Philippine–American War. The reverse features a painting of his brother, Juan Luna, depicting the blood compact between Spanish explorer Miguel López de Legazpi and Datu Sikatuna, the chieftain of Bohol.

==== Pilipino series (1969–1974) ====
In 1967, Sergio Osmeña replaced the portrait of Luna. The note is now predominantly red in color. On the reverse, it now features the Old Legislative Building. The design of the obverse was later revised, switching the positions of the "50" on the lower right corner with the Central Bank logo on the upper right, the signature of the Central Bank Governor was placed beside the signature of the President of the Philippines, the font for Republika ng Pilipinas was also changed and the text Limampung Piso was made into one line. This design was later used when the Bagong Lipunan series was released in 1973.

==== Ang Bagong Lipunan series (1973–1996) ====
In 1973, the "Ang Bagong Lipunan" text was added and was overprinted on the watermark area.

==== New Design series (1985–2018) ====
The bill was completely redesigned and new elements regarding Osmeña's achievement as the first Speaker of the Philippine Assembly, a precursor of the current House of Representatives were shown on the right side, namely, the mace and the gavel, the symbols used by the Philippine Congress. Also on the right side is the Fuente Osmeña located in Cebu City, Osmeña's birthplace. The reverse side featured the Old Legislative Building, the home to various legislative bodies of the Philippine government. The banknote was designed by Rafael Asuncion. It was set to be released in 1985 as evidenced with the signature of President Ferdinand Marcos in the banknote, but unused and its release was delayed to 1987 due to People Power Revolution.

After the creation of the Bangko Sentral ng Pilipinas in 1993, its new logo was incorporated on all the New Design series bills.

In 1998, starting with red prefix "LJ" after its last batch of without year of printing with the 50 years of Central Banking commemorative bill, the year mark was added at the bottom of the denomination value located at the upper left corner of the obverse.

In 1999, the names of the signatories on the bills were added starting with banknotes featuring the signature of President Joseph Estrada.

Starting with banknotes featuring the signature of President Gloria Macapagal Arroyo in October 4, 2001, the name of the Old Legislative Building (Dating Gusali ng Batasan, with the name was located at the lower-left side) on the reverse side was changed to the "National Museum" (Gusali ng Pambansang Museo) and the name was moved at the top of the building, to reflect the turnover made by the Congress of the Philippines to the National Museum. The name of the building's facade was changed from "Executive House" to "National Museum". Also, the serial number was moved at the top of the denomination that was located on the lower left side of the banknote.

==== New Generation series (2010–present) ====
In 2010, the portrait of Sergio Osmeña was revised, a picture of the first Philippine Assembly and Osmeña and General Douglas MacArthur's landing in Leyte was added on the lower left corner and bottom center of the note respectively. The reverse now features the Taal Lake and the giant trevally.

In 2017, an updated version of the New Generation series 50 piso banknote was issued with changes in the font size of the year of issue and the italicization of the scientific name on the reverse side. The text "October 1944" was added after the word "Leyte Landing" on the obverse.

In 2020, an enhanced version of the 50 peso banknote was released. It added one pair of tactile marks for the visually impaired, on both the extreme left and right side of the front of the note.

The new BSP logo, which was redesigned in January 2021 was adopted in all NGC banknotes starting with the 2022 issued banknotes featuring the signatures of President Ferdinand Marcos Jr. and BSP Governor Felipe Medalla.

=== Version history ===
	English Series (1951–1971)	Pilipino Series (1969–1974)	Ang Bagong Lipunan Series (1973–1996)	New Design/BSP Series (1985–2018)	New Generation Currency Series (2010–present)
Obverse					
Reverse					

==== First Philippine Polymer series (2024–present) ====
50-Piso First Philippine Polymer series banknote
Image		Dimensions	Main Color	Design		Year of First Issue	Usage in circulation
Obverse	Reverse	Dimensions	Main Color	Obverse	Reverse	Year of First Issue	Usage in circulation
		160 mm × 66 mm	Red	Visayan leopard cat (Prionailurus bengalensis rabori), Vidal's Lanutan (Hibiscus campylosiphon)	Taal Lake in Batangas; Caranx ignobilis, maliputo (giant trevally); Batangas embroidery design	December 19, 2024	In circulation
For table standards, see the banknote specification table.

== Commemorative issues ==
Throughout its existence, the fifty peso bill have been overprinted to commemorate certain events, namely:

- 100th Birth Anniversary of Sergio Osmeña commemorative bill - In 1978, the Bangko Sentral ng Pilipinas introduced 50-peso banknotes with an overprint for the birth centenary of former President Sergio Osmeña. The words, "IKA-100 TAONG KAARAWAN 1878-1978" ("100th Birth Anniversary 1878-1978") are placed near the portrait.
- 50 years of Central Banking commemorative bill - At a last batch of the banknote not having a year mark with red initial letters "J", "K" and "L" from "LA" TO "LH" in 1998, the Bangko Sentral ng Pilipinas introduced the 50-peso banknotes with an overprint commemorating 50 years of central banking. The overprint shows the Old BSP Building in Intramuros and the New BSP Complex in Malate, Manila. It appears on the watermark area in red. The second version, released on the central bank's 50th anniversary in 1999, has printing year and with the signature of President Joseph Estrada.
- 60 years of Central Banking commemorative bill - On July 9, 2009, the Bangko Sentral ng Pilipinas introduced 12 million banknotes (2 million banknotes for each denomination) with an overprint commemorating 60 years of central banking. The overprint appears on the watermark area on all six circulating denominations.
- 45th ASEAN celebration commemorative note - A total of 10 million pieces bearing the ASEAN logo were released into general circulation to commemorate the 45th ASEAN Day celebration held on August 10. Souvenir copies containing an uncut sheet of four notes were presented to the nine members of ASEAN during the celebrations.
- San Pedro Calungsod canonization commemorative note - On February 4, 2013, the BSP announced the release of a special limited edition note featuring the new Filipino saint, Saint Pedro Calungsod, this note was scheduled to be released on April 2, 2013, the month that the Philippines will celebrate the first feast of Calungsod as a saint. The overprint features a portrait of Pedro Calungsod, the dates 1672–2012, the words "St. Pedro Calungsod Canonization" and the quote "LIFE THAT IS OFFERED FAITH THAT IS PROCLAIMED".
- Philippine Deposit Insurance Corporation 50th Anniversary commemorative note - Issued on June 20, 2013, to commemorate the 50th Anniversary of the state deposit insurer Philippine Deposit Insurance Corporation (PDIC). The blue overprint consists of their logo and its customer philosophy "Committed to serve".
- Trinity University of Asia 50th Anniversary commemorative note - Issued to celebrate the 50th Anniversary of Trinity University of Asia. The commemorative note consists of the seal and the words "TUA @ 50: ACHIEVING OUR GOLDEN DREAMS".

== Printing years ==
Banknote series	Year	President of the Philippines	BSP Governor
English Series	1951–1953	Elpidio Quirino	Miguel Cuaderno Sr.
English Series	1953–1957	Ramon Magsaysay	Miguel Cuaderno Sr.
English Series	1957–1960	Carlos P. Garcia	Miguel Cuaderno Sr.
English Series	1961–1962	Diosdado P. Macapagal	Andres V. Castillo
Pilipino Series	1969–1970	Ferdinand E. Marcos	Alfonso Calalang
Pilipino Series	1970–1972	Ferdinand E. Marcos	Gregorio S. Licaros
Ang Bagong Lipunan Series	1973–1981	Ferdinand E. Marcos	Gregorio S. Licaros
Ang Bagong Lipunan Series	1981–1984	Ferdinand E. Marcos	Jaime C. Laya
Ang Bagong Lipunan Series	1984–1985	Ferdinand E. Marcos	Jose B. Fernandez Jr.
New Design Series	1985 (unused)	Ferdinand E. Marcos	Jose B. Fernandez Jr.
New Design Series	1987–1990	Corazon C. Aquino	Jose B. Fernandez Jr.
New Design Series	1990–1992	Corazon C. Aquino	Jose L. Cuisia Jr.
New Design Series	1992–1993	Fidel V. Ramos	Jose L. Cuisia Jr.
New Design Series	1993–1998	Fidel V. Ramos	Gabriel C. Singson
New Design Series	1998–1999	Joseph Estrada	Gabriel C. Singson
New Design Series	1999–2001	Joseph Estrada	Rafael B. Buenaventura
New Design Series	2001–2004	Gloria Macapagal Arroyo	Rafael B. Buenaventura
New Design Series	2005–2010	Gloria Macapagal Arroyo	Amando M. Tetangco Jr.
New Design Series	2010–2013	Benigno S. Aquino III	Amando M. Tetangco Jr.
New Generation Currency Series	2010–2016	Benigno S. Aquino III	Amando M. Tetangco Jr.
New Generation Currency Series	2016–2017	Rodrigo Duterte	Amando M. Tetangco Jr.
New Generation Currency Series	2017–2019	Rodrigo Duterte	Nestor Espenilla Jr.
New Generation Currency Series	2019–2022	Rodrigo Duterte	Benjamin E. Diokno
New Generation Currency Series	2022–2023	Bongbong Marcos	Felipe M. Medalla
New Generation Currency Series	2024–present	Bongbong Marcos	Eli M. Remolona Jr.
First Philippine Polymer Series	2024–present	Bongbong Marcos	Eli M. Remolona Jr.
