= Philippine twenty-peso coin =

Largest denomination coin

Twenty pesos
- Philippines
- Value: 20.00 Philippine pesos
- Mass: 11.50 g
- Diameter: 30 mm
- Thickness: 2.2 mm
- Edge: Plain with edge inscription of "BSP" in italics at six angles
- Composition: Bi-metallic (Bronze-plated steel ring with a Nickel-plated steel center plug)
- Years of minting: 2019–present

Obverse
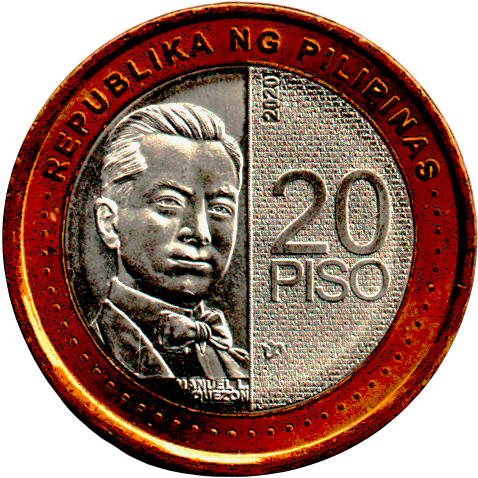
- Design: "Republika ng Pilipinas"; Portrait of Manuel Quezon; Value; Microprint of "Republika ng Pilipinas"; Year of minting; Mint mark
- Designer: Julius Caezar G. Moraga of Bangko Sentral ng Pilipinas
- Design date: 2019

Reverse
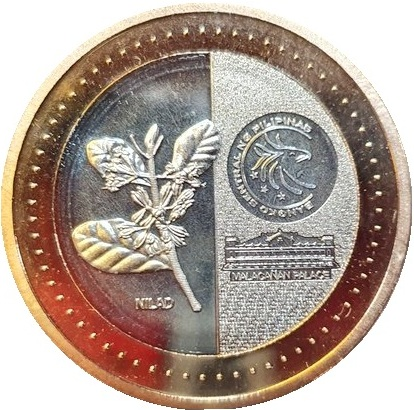
- Design: Scyphiphora hydrophylacea (Nilad); logo of the Bangko Sentral ng Pilipinas; Malacañang Palace; Microprint of "Bangko Sentral ng Pilipinas"
- Designer: Julius Caezar G. Moraga of Bangko Sentral ng Pilipinas
- Design date: 2019

The Philippine twenty-peso coin (₱20) is the largest denomination coin of the Philippine peso.

== History ==
New Generation Currency Series: In July 2019, the Bangko Sentral ng Pilipinas (BSP) announced that the 20-peso note would be replaced with a coin due to the overuse of the banknote, since each individual note only lasts about a year in circulation, while a 20-peso coin lasts for 10 to 15 years. The decision was based on research by the University of the Philippines.

In September 2019, the ₱20 coin was designed. BSP Governor Benjamin Diokno stated that the design would retain Manuel L. Quezon as the person on the obverse, and be bi-metallic with a bronze-plated steel outer ring and a nickel-plated steel center and that it would be slightly bigger than the ₱10 coin. He mentioned there would be other features making it distinct from the other New Generation coins.

Photos of the new coin were released in December 2019, along with the "enhanced" 5 peso coin, confirming their designs. The coin was initially planned to be released in late 2019 or early 2020. In another December 2019 report, it was reported that 500,000 coins of the new denomination were released, with more to be minted in 2020.

=== Version history ===
	New Generation Currency Series (2019–present)
Obverse	
Reverse	

== See also ==
- Philippine twenty-peso note
