= New Generation Currency Series =

Philippine currency issued since 2010

Piso ng Pilipinas (Filipino)
- New Generation Currency Series banknotes and coins NGC Series banknotes and coins

ISO 4217
- Code: PHP (numeric: 608)
- Subunit: 0.01

Demographics
- User(s): Philippines

The New Generation Currency (NGC) Series is the name used to refer to the Philippine peso currency series conceptualized from 2007 to 2010, and banknotes issued since 2010 and coins issued since 2017.

== History ==
=== 2007–2019: New Generation Currency Project and Demonetization of New Design Series ===
In 2007, Bangko Sentral ng Pilipinas (BSP) began the 12-year demonetization process of the New Design Series when the New Generation Currency (NGC) project was started the formal conceptualization process, which was a meeting of the minds of people with diverse backgrounds and ideas: central bankers, artists, technocrats, historians, communication experts, and currency printers to further enhance security features and to improve durability. The thematic content, designs, and security features underwent thorough deliberations and evaluation, and was undertaken by the BSP’s Numismatic Committee (Num Com) in consultation with the Monetary Board (MB) and, subsequently, with the approval of the BSP Governor and the President of the Philippines.

The members of the numismatic committee included Bangko Sentral Deputy Governor Diwa Guinigundo and Dr. Ambeth Ocampo, chairman of the National Historical Institute. Designed by Studio 5 Designs and Design Systemat, the new banknotes' designs features famous Filipinos and iconic natural wonders. Philippine national symbols will be depicted on coins. The series' initial batch started printing on November 2010 and released it to the general public on December 16, 2010, three years after the project and process for NDS demonetization were started. The word used in the bills was "Pilipino" rendered in Baybayin (ᜉᜒᜎᜒᜉᜒᜈᜓ). The font used for lettering in the banknotes is Myriad, Twentieth Century, and Montserrat. It was approved by Presidents Gloria Macapagal Arroyo and her immediate successor Benigno Aquino III, making the only banknote series to be approved by two presidents.

In December 2016, BSP announced that they will launch sets of banknotes bearing President Rodrigo Duterte's signature. The BSP initially released five million pieces of the new 20, 50, 100, 500, and 1,000-peso bills with Duterte's signature. As for the 200-pesos bills, only two million pieces were released because of lower demand for this denomination.

In 2017, Bangko Sentral ng Pilipinas updated the design of the P200 and P1000 NGC series banknotes. Also on that same year, BSP introduced the New Generation Currency Coin Series which was circulated through banks. The new series features native Philippine flora. Sentimo denominated coins feature a stylized representation of the Philippine flag on the obverse. Peso denominated coins depict the portraits of renowned national heroes of the Philippines on the obverse. The coins are struck in Nickel-plated steel for all six denominations, in response to the widespread hoarding and melting down of the coins, decreasing the cost of production of minting the coins and address concerns of the discoloration of the coins due to the humid, tropical environment. The 10-sentimo coin is not included in this series, because it was removed as a general circulation coin.

In July 2019, the BSP announced plans to replace the ₱20 bill with a ₱20 coin by the 1st quarter of 2020. However, ₱20 bills are still printed in 2020, alongside the enhanced version of the other denominations.

The New Generation Currency series were the only circulating set of notes since August 2, 2019 upon the demonetization of 2,000 and 100,000 peso commemorative banknotes, which completed the 12-year NGC project and demonetization process of NDS/BSP series banknotes.

=== 2019–present: Post-NGC project changes and additions ===
In September 2019, Benjamin Diokno, the current BSP governor, announced that the ₱5 coin, being confused for the ₱1 coin, will have a revised design, featuring a wave edge or scallop shape and enhanced security features. The ₱20 coin received its final designs in the same month and the two coins will be released for circulation in December 2019. The 5-piso coin will have a nonagonal shape. The 20-piso coin will be bimetallic. The 20-piso coin will be the second bimetallic coin in circulation after the 10-piso coin of the New Design/BSP series. In July 2020, the BSP released an improved version of the NGC series. In addition to the security features currently present for five denominations (excluding the P20 banknote), the new banknotes will have an updated security thread and design for all five denominations. The notes also have features for the benefit of the visually impaired.

In 2021, the BSP announced that it will test run the issuance of polymer banknotes through a limited issuance of 1,000-peso bills during the first half of 2022, as part of a long-term study to move to polymer notes. The banknotes will be printed by Note Printing Australia (NPA), wholly owned subsidiary of the Reserve Bank of Australia (RBA) as result of a government-to-government (G2G) memorandum of understanding between the RBA and the BSP.

In 2021, BSP silently approved the end of production of the 200-peso banknote due to low usage.

In December 2022, BSP announced the new banknotes bearing the signatures of President Bongbong Marcos and BSP Governor Felipe Medalla. The 2020 BSP logo is now also used on 20, 50, 100, 500, and 1,000-piso (non-polymer version) bills which replaced the 2010 logo that has been in use since March 2010 upon the announcement of the series' imminent start of print run and resulting release to the public from November to December 2010 where its early design closer to the final was previewed.

== Banknotes ==
=== Original series ===
New Generation Currency series (2010 original)
Image		Value	Dimensions	Main Color	Design		Year of First Issue	Usage in circulation
Obverse	Reverse	Value	Dimensions	Main Color	Obverse	Reverse	Year of First Issue	Usage in circulation
		₱20	160 mm × 66 mm	Orange	Manuel L. Quezon (1878–1944), Declaration of Filipino as the national language, Malacañang Palace	Banaue Rice Terraces; Paradoxurus hermaphroditus (Asian palm civet); Cordilleras weave design	November 2010	Wide
		₱50	160 mm × 66 mm	Red	Sergio Osmeña (1878–1961), First Philippine Assembly, Leyte Landing	Taal Lake in Batangas; Caranx ignobilis, maliputo (giant trevally); Batangas embroidery design	November 2010	Wide
		₱100	160 mm × 66 mm	Violet	Manuel A. Roxas (1892–1948), Old Bangko Sentral ng Pilipinas (BSP) building in Intramuros, Manila, Inauguration of the Third Philippine Republic	Mayon Volcano in Albay; Rhincodon typus, whale shark (butanding); Bicol textile design	November 2010	Limited
		₱100	160 mm × 66 mm	Violet (mauve)	Manuel A. Roxas, Old Bangko Sentral ng Pilipinas (BSP) building in Intramuros, Manila, Inauguration of the Third Philippine Republic, stronger mauve color than previous banknote	Mayon Volcano in Albay; Rhincodon typus, whale shark (butanding); Bicol textile design	April 11, 2015	Wide
		₱200	160 mm × 66 mm	Green	Diosdado P. Macapagal (1910–1997), EDSA People Power 2001, Aguinaldo Shrine in Kawit, Cavite, Barasoain Church in Malolos, Bulacan	Chocolate Hills in Bohol; Tarsius syrichta, Philippine tarsier; Visayas weave design	November 2010	Limited
		₱200	160 mm × 66 mm	Green	Diosdado P. Macapagal, EDSA People Power 2001, Declaration of Philippine Independence in Kawit, Cavite, Opening of the Malolos Congress in Barasoain Church, Malolos, Bulacan	Chocolate Hills in Bohol; Tarsius syrichta, Philippine tarsier; Visayas weave design	December 5, 2017	Wide
		₱500	160 mm × 66 mm	Yellow	Corazon C. Aquino (1933–2009), Benigno S. Aquino Jr. (1932–1983), EDSA People Power I, Benigno Aquino monument in Makati	Subterranean Underground River in Puerto Princesa, Palawan; Tanygnathus lucionensis, blue-naped parrot; Southern Philippines cloth design	November 2010	Wide
		₱1000	160 mm × 66 mm	Blue	José Abad Santos (1886–1942), Vicente Lim (1888–1944), Josefa Llanes Escoda (1898–1945); Centennial celebration of Philippine independence; Philippine Medal of Honor	Tubbataha Reefs Natural Park in Sulu Sea; Pinctada maxima, South Sea pearl; Mindanao design for T'nalak (Ikat-dyed abaca)	November 2010	Limited
		₱1000	160 mm × 66 mm	Blue	José Abad Santos, Vicente Lim, Josefa Llanes Escoda; Centennial celebration of Philippine independence	Tubbataha Reefs Natural Park in Sulu Sea; Pinctada maxima, South Sea pearl; Mindanao design for T'nalak (Ikat-dyed abaca)	December 5, 2017	Wide
For table standards, see the banknote specification table.

=== Enhanced (2020) series ===
New Generation Currency series (2020 enhanced)
Image		Value	Dimensions	Main Color	Design		Year of First Issue	Usage in circulation
Obverse	Reverse	Value	Dimensions	Main Color	Obverse	Reverse	Year of First Issue	Usage in circulation
		₱50	160 mm × 66 mm	Red	Sergio Osmeña, First Philippine Assembly, Leyte Landing	Taal Lake in Batangas; Caranx ignobilis, maliputo (giant trevally); Batangas embroidery design	July 29, 2020	Wide
		₱100	160 mm × 66 mm	Violet (mauve)	Manuel A. Roxas, Old Bangko Sentral ng Pilipinas (BSP) building in Intramuros, Manila, Inauguration of the Third Philippine Republic, stronger mauve color than previous banknote	Mayon Volcano in Albay; Rhincodon typus, whale shark (butanding); Bicol textile design	July 29, 2020	Wide
		₱200	160 mm × 66 mm	Green	Diosdado P. Macapagal, EDSA People Power 2001, Declaration of Philippine Independence in Kawit, Cavite, Opening of the Malolos Congress in Barasoain Church, Malolos, Bulacan	Chocolate Hills in Bohol; Tarsius syrichta, Philippine tarsier; Visayas weave design	July 29, 2020	Wide
		₱500	160 mm × 66 mm	Yellow	Corazon C. Aquino, Benigno S. Aquino Jr., EDSA People Power I, Benigno Aquino monument in Makati	Subterranean Underground River in Puerto Princesa, Palawan; Tanygnathus lucionensis, blue-naped parrot; Southern Philippines cloth design	July 29, 2020	Wide
		₱1000	160 mm × 66 mm	Blue	José Abad Santos, Vicente Lim, Josefa Llanes Escoda; Centennial celebration of Philippine independence	Tubbataha Reefs Natural Park in Sulu Sea; Pinctada maxima, South Sea pearl; Mindanao design for T'nalak (Ikat-dyed abaca)	July 29, 2020	Wide
For table standards, see the banknote specification table.

== Coins ==
New Generation Currency series
Image		Face Value	Technical parameters				Description			Introduced
Obverse	Reverse	Face Value	Diameter	Mass	Edge Thickness	Composition	Edge	Obverse	Reverse	Introduced
		1¢	15 mm	1.90 g	1.54 mm	Nickel-plated steel	Plain	"Republika ng Pilipinas"; Three stars and the sun (stylized representation of the Philippine flag); Value; Year of minting; Mint mark	Xanthostemon verdugonianus (Mangkono); logo of the Bangko Sentral ng Pilipinas	November 30, 2017
		5¢	16 mm	2.20 g	1.60 mm	Nickel-plated steel	Reeded	"Republika ng Pilipinas"; Three stars and the sun (stylized representation of the Philippine flag); Value; Year of minting; Mint mark	Hoya pubicalyx (Kapal-kapal Baging); logo of the Bangko Sentral ng Pilipinas	November 30, 2017
		25¢	20 mm	3.60 g	1.65 mm	Nickel-plated steel	Plain	"Republika ng Pilipinas"; Three stars and the sun (stylized representation of the Philippine flag); Value; Year of minting; Mint mark	Dillenia philippinensis (Katmon); logo of the Bangko Sentral ng Pilipinas	November 30, 2017
		₱ 1	23 mm	6.00 g	2.05 mm	Nickel-plated steel	Segmented (Plain and Reeded edges)	"Republika ng Pilipinas"; Portrait of José Rizal; Value; Year of minting; Mint mark	Vanda sanderiana (Waling-waling); logo of the Bangko Sentral ng Pilipinas	November 30, 2017
		₱ 5	25 mm	7.40 g	2.20 mm	Nickel-plated steel	Plain	"Republika ng Pilipinas"; Portrait of Andrés Bonifacio; Value; Microprint of "Republika ng Pilipinas"; Year of minting; Mint mark	Strongylodon macrobotrys (Tayabak); logo of the Bangko Sentral ng Pilipinas; Microprint of "Bangko Sentral ng Pilipinas"	November 30, 2017
		₱ 5 (nonagonal shape)	25 mm	7.40 g	2.20 mm	Nickel-plated steel	Plain	"Republika ng Pilipinas"; Portrait of Andrés Bonifacio; Value; Microprint of "Republika ng Pilipinas"; Year of minting; Mint mark	Strongylodon macrobotrys (Tayabak); logo of the Bangko Sentral ng Pilipinas; Microprint of "Bangko Sentral ng Pilipinas"	December 17, 2019
		₱ 10	27 mm	8.00 g	2.05 mm	Nickel-plated steel	Reeded with edge inscription of "BANGKO SENTRAL NG PILIPINAS" in italics	"Republika ng Pilipinas"; Portrait of Apolinario Mabini; Value; Microprint of "Republika ng Pilipinas"; Year of minting; Mint mark	Medinilla magnifica (Kapa-kapa); logo of the Bangko Sentral ng Pilipinas; Microprint of "Bangko Sentral ng Pilipinas"; Microdots	November 30, 2017
		₱ 20	30 mm	11.50 g	2.05 mm	Ring: bronze-plated steel	Plain edge with inscription of "BSP" at six angles	Ring: "Republika ng Pilipinas"	Scyphiphora hydrophylacea (Nilad); logo of the Bangko Sentral ng Pilipinas; Malacañang Palace; Microprint of "Bangko Sentral ng Pilipinas"; Microdots	December 17, 2019
		₱ 20	30 mm	11.50 g	2.05 mm	Center: nickel-plated steel	Plain edge with inscription of "BSP" at six angles	Center: Portrait of Manuel Quezon; Value; Microprint of "Republika ng Pilipinas"; Year of minting; Mint mark; Microdot	Scyphiphora hydrophylacea (Nilad); logo of the Bangko Sentral ng Pilipinas; Malacañang Palace; Microprint of "Bangko Sentral ng Pilipinas"; Microdots	December 17, 2019

== Design ==
=== Coins ===
==== 1 sentimo ====
The obverse side of the coin features the description "Republika ng Pilipinas", the three stars and the sun (stylized representation of the Philippine flag), the denomination, year of minting, and mint mark, and the reverse side of the coin depicts the Xanthostemon verdugonianus (Mangkono), a plant endemic to the Philippines and the current logo of the Bangko Sentral ng Pilipinas. The composition is nickel-plated steel, has diameter of 15 mm, and mass of 1.9 grams.

==== 5 sentimo ====
The obverse side of the coin features the description "Republika ng Pilipinas", the three stars and the sun (stylized representation of the Philippine flag), the denomination, year of minting, and mint mark, and the reverse side of the coin depicts the Hoya pubicalyx (Kapal-kapal baging), a plant endemic to the Philippines and the current logo of the Bangko Sentral ng Pilipinas. The composition is nickel-plated steel, has diameter of 16 mm, and mass of 2.2 grams.

==== 25 sentimo ====
The obverse side of the coin features the description "Republika ng Pilipinas", the three stars and the sun (stylized representation of the Philippine flag), the denomination, year of minting, and mint mark, and the reverse side of the coin depicts the Dillenia philippinensis (Katmon), a plant endemic to the Philippines and the current logo of the Bangko Sentral ng Pilipinas. The composition is nickel-plated steel, has diameter of 20 mm, and mass of 3.6 grams. The size and mass of this coin is the same as the 25 sentimo coin in the BSP Series.

==== 1 piso ====
The obverse side of the coin features the description "Republika ng Pilipinas", José Rizal, a national hero of the Philippines, the denomination, year of minting, and mint mark, and the reverse side of the coin depicts the Vanda sanderiana (Waling-Waling), a plant endemic to the Philippines and the current logo of the Bangko Sentral ng Pilipinas. The composition is nickel-plated steel, has diameter of 23 mm, and mass of 6 grams.

==== 5 piso ====
The obverse side of the coin features the description "Republika ng Pilipinas", Andrés Bonifacio, a national hero of the Philippines, the denomination, year of minting, and mint mark, and the reverse side of the coin depicts the Strongylodon macrobotrys (Tayabak), a plant endemic to the Philippines and the current logo of the Bangko Sentral ng Pilipinas. The composition is nickel-plated steel, has diameter of 25 mm, and mass of 7.4 grams. Due to the confusion of the 5-piso coin bearing similarities with the 1-piso coin (mainly caused by its similar size), the Bangko Sentral ng Pilipinas has reissued the 5-piso coin in a nonagonal (9-sided shape) into circulation on December 17, 2019.

==== 10 piso ====
The obverse side of the coin features the description "Republika ng Pilipinas", Apolinario Mabini, a national hero of the Philippines, the denomination, year of minting, and mint mark, and the reverse side of the coin depicts the Medinilla magnifica (Kapa-kapa), a plant endemic to the Philippines and the current logo of the Bangko Sentral ng Pilipinas. The composition is nickel-plated steel, has diameter of 27 mm, and mass of 8 grams.

==== 20 piso ====
The 20 piso banknote was changed into a coin released in December 2019 to solve the overuse of its corresponding banknote that only takes a year to replace it with a new banknote based on a research by the University of the Philippines. The Bangko Sentral ng Pilipinas stated that the new 20 piso coin lasts for 10 to 15 years, longer than a 20 piso banknote. The coin was issued into circulation on December 17, 2019. The coin is bi-metallic, with a bronze-plated steel outer ring and a nickel-plated steel center plug, and is the second bi-metallic coin issued by the Bangko Sentral ng Pilipinas, after the 10 peso coin of the New Design/BSP series. The obverse side of the coin features a portrait of Philippine President Manuel Quezon and the reverse side of the coin depict the Scyphiphora hydrophylacea (Nilad), Malacañang Palace, the official residence and workplace of the President of the Philippines and the current logo of the Bangko Sentral ng Pilipinas. One notable feature is the edge inscription, with the initial "BSP" at six angles. This is the fourth edge inscription coin used in the Philippines in common circulation.

=== Banknotes ===
==== 20 piso ====
Colored orange, the main design on the front of the note features a portrait of Philippine president Manuel L. Quezon along with scenes associated with Quezon, including the declaration of Filipino as the national language of the Philippines and Malacañang Palace, the official residence of the President of the Philippines. The designs on the back of the note depict the Banaue Rice Terraces, the Asian palm civet (Paradoxurus hermaphroditus), and a weave design from the Cordilleras.

==== 50 piso ====
Colored red, the main designs shown on the front of the note depict a portrait of Philippine president Sergio Osmeña and images tied to him, one depicting the First Philippine Assembly in 1907 and the other the Leyte Landing. The main designs on the back show Taal Lake, the Giant Trevally (locally known as Maliputo) (Caranx ignobilis) and an embroidery design from Batangas province.

==== 100 piso ====
Colored violet, the main designs for this denomination on the front depict a portrait of Philippine president Manuel A. Roxas and images associated with Roxas, including the founding of the Central Bank of the Philippines (Bangko Sentral ng Pilipinas) in 1949 and the Inauguration of the Third Philippine Republic on July 4, 1946. The main designs shown on the back feature the Mayon Volcano, the Whale Shark (locally known as Butanding, scientific name Rhincodon typus) and a weave design from Bicol. The original version, issued from 2010 to 2016, included a blue underprint. Notes issued from 2016 onwards have a strong mauve or violet color, due to complaints that the color of the 100 pesos note is almost indistinguishable from the 1,000 pesos note.

==== 200 piso ====
Colored green, the main designs of the front of the note feature a portrait of Philippine president Diosdado P. Macapagal, along with images associated with Macapagal, including the EDSA People Power 2001, the Aguinaldo Shrine in Kawit, Cavite and the Barasoain Church in Malolos, Bulacan. The main designs on the back of the note feature the Chocolate Hills in Bohol, the Philippine tarsier (Tarsius syrichta), and a weave design from the Visayas. The main designs on the front of the note were used from 2010 to 2017. The 2017 issue features images showing the Declaration of Philippine Independence in Kawit, Cavite, and the Opening of the Malolos Congress in Barasoain Church, Malolos, Bulacan.

==== 500 piso ====
Colored yellow, the main designs on the front of the note feature the dual portraits of Philippine Senator Benigno Aquino Jr. and his wife, Philippine president Corazon C. Aquino. Also on the front of the note are images associated to the couple, the image of the 1986 People Power Revolution and the Benigno Aquino Jr. monument in Makati. The main designs on the back of the note feature the Subterranean River National Park, the Blue-naped parrot (Tanygnathus lucionensis), and a cloth design from the Southern Philippines.

==== 1,000 piso ====
Colored light-blue, the main designs on the front of the note feature the trio portraits of José Abad Santos, Vicente Lim and Josefa Llanes Escoda. Also on the front of the note is an image of the Centennial celebration of Philippine independence. The main designs on the back of the note feature the Tubbataha Reefs Natural Park, the South Sea Pearl (Pinctada maxima), and a cloth design from the Mindanao design for T'nalak (Ikat-dyed abaca). The original issue from 2010 to 2017 featured the Order of Lakandula (erroneously labelled as "Medal of Honor") and its description on the front. Notes issued from 2017 onwards omit both the medal and its description.

== Commemorative banknotes ==
=== 5,000 piso ===
On January 18, 2021, the Bangko Sentral ng Pilipinas issued a non-circulating 5,000 piso banknote in commemoration of the Quincentennial Commemorations in the Philippines, the anniversary of the Victory of Mactan, which Lapulapu vanquished Portuguese conquistador Ferdinand Magellan and his army in their attempt to colonize Mactan.

On its obverse, the banknote depicts a young Lapulapu, an image of the Battle of Mactan, the QCP logo, and the Karakoa, the large outrigger warships used by native Filipinos, while on its reverse shows the Philippine eagle, or the Manaol, which symbolizes clear vision, freedom, and strength; and which embodies the ancient Visayan belief that all living creatures originated from an eagle, also featured are the tree of a coconut, which was food the people of Samar provided to Ferdinand Magellan and his crew; and Mount Apo, which is located in Mindanao, where the circumnavigators finally found directional clues to their intended destination of Maluku or the Spice Island.

This commemorative non-circulating banknote is predominantly brown in color.

Commemorative banknote in the New Generation Currency series
Image		Value	Dimensions	Main Color	Design		Year	
Obverse	Reverse	Value	Dimensions	Main Color	Obverse	Reverse	First Issue	Withdrawal
		₱5000	216 mm × 133 mm	Brown	Lapulapu, Battle of Mactan, Karakoa, seal of the BSP (Bangko Sentral ng Pilipinas), 2021 Quincentennial Commemoration logo, Visayan patik (tattoo) pattern design	Philippine eagle (Manaol), Coconut tree (Lubi), Mount Apo	January 18, 2021	
For table standards, see the banknote specification table.

== Commemorative Coins ==
Commemorative coin in the New Generation Currency series
Image		Face Value	Technical parameters				Description			Introduced
Obverse	Reverse	Face Value	Diameter	Mass	Edge Thickness	Composition	Edge	Obverse	Reverse	Introduced
		₱ 10	27 mm	8.00 g	2.05 mm	Nickel-plated steel	Reeded with edge inscription of "BANGKO SENTRAL NG PILIPINAS" in italics	"Republika ng Pilipinas"; Portrait of Apolinario Mabini; Value; Microprint of "Republika ng Pilipinas"; Year of minting; Mint mark	ASEAN 2026 logo; QR code; 2020 logo of the Bangko Sentral ng Pilipinas	January 2026
