= New Design series =

Series of Filipino currency

₱5, ₱10, ₱20, ₱50, ₱100, ₱200, ₱500, ₱1000
- Country: Philippines
- Value: Piso ng Pilipinas (Filipino)
- Years of printing: 1985–1995 (₱5); 1985–2001 (₱10); 1985–2013 (₱500); 1986–2012 (₱20); 1987–2013 (₱50, ₱100); 1991–2012 (₱1000); 2002–2013 (₱200)

The New Design Series (NDS), also known as the BSP Series, was the name used to refer to the banknotes of the Philippine peso. They were conceptualized from 1983 to 1985, issued from 1985 to 2013, and circulated from 1985 to 2019. The coins of the series were minted and issued from 1995 to 2017, and remain legal tender as of 2026. It was succeeded by the New Generation Currency (NGC) Series. The series used the Friz Quadrata, Arial, Optima, and Helvetica typefaces.

== History ==
When President Ferdinand Marcos' Martial Law was lifted in 1981, the central bank of the country, Bangko Sentral ng Pilipinas (BSP), started to print and mint a new series of Philippine peso banknotes and coins, adopting anti-counterfeiting features. On June 12, 1985, the BSP issued the New Design Series, beginning with the 5-peso banknote which had the face of Emilio Aguinaldo on the obverse side. The following month, the 10-peso banknote, with the face of Apolinario Mabini on the obverse side, was issued. In January 1986, a new 20-peso banknote was introduced.

Following the Philippines' new Constitution coming into effect in 1987, the 50 and 100-peso banknotes, featuring Sergio Osmeña and Manuel Roxas, were introduced on April of the said year. Before the second circulated version of 500-peso banknote with Ninoy Aquino, the first unreleased version was slated to feature Marcos which were already printed with 2 million banknotes as initial batch but the People Power Revolution caused it to be replaced by the former and also delayed the denomination's release to August 21, 1987. On December 7, 1991, the BSP issued a 1000-peso banknote, for the first time. It contained composite portraits of Jose Abad Santos, Josefa Llanes Escoda, and Vicente Lim, considered to be World War II heroes.

The 5- and 10-peso banknotes stopped production in June 1995 and July 2001, respectively, due to wear and tear caused by widespread usage. They were replaced by coin versions, though the banknotes remained the liability of the BSP until January 3, 2018. On May 2, 1997, the portrait of Andrés Bonifacio was added beside Apolinario Mabini on the 10-peso banknote. Elements of Katipunan were also included on the right side of the bill. The reverse design was likewise revised. The scene depicting the Katipuneros' blood compact, previously featured on the 5-peso banknote in the Pilipino and Ang Bagong Lipunan series, was added to the right side of the Barasoain Church. However, the watermark area continued to feature only Mabini, and the embedded security thread remained on the right side of the BSP governor's signature until 1998. As a result, banknotes with Bonifacio's image issued between 1997 and 1998 used the same paper originally intended for the 1985 version, which featured only Mabini.

Year of printing was implemented in the series starting with the second version of 10-peso banknote in May 1997, followed by the rest of the series' denominations 20, 50, 100, 500, and 1,000 in 1998 (with 50 starting with red prefix "LJ" after the first version of 50 years of BSP commemorative note without a year mark). The 5-peso is the only one to not use it as the banknote already stopped production at the said month of 1995 two years before it was implemented.

In 1998, the 100,000-peso Centennial banknote, measuring 8.5" x 14" and recognized by the Guinness World Records as the world's largest legal tender note, was issued in a limited quantity of 1,000 pieces to commemorate the Centennial of Philippine Independence. Alongside this, the 2,000-peso Centennial note, measuring 216 mm x 133 mm and bearing the signature of President Joseph Estrada, was launched on December 1, 1998. In 1999, the names of the signatories on banknotes were first included, beginning with those bearing the signature of Estrada. During the Estrada administration, the long-standing practice since the Commonwealth era, of reproducing the signature of the President of the Philippines above the legend "President of the Philippines," was discontinued. Instead, the president's full name was explicitly printed. Additionally, the names of the signatories were rendered in all capital letters, while their positions were printed in lowercase.

Meanwhile, in the late 1990s, color reproduction machines became commercially available and posed a significant threat to the integrity of the currency. As a result, in 2001, the BSP decided to enhance the security features of the 1,000-, 500-, and 100-peso banknotes (with the 500- and 100-peso notes bearing the signature of President Gloria Macapagal Arroyo), as well as the 200-peso note, which was issued on June 12, 2002. These enhancements included the incorporation of an iridescent band and a windowed security thread to combat counterfeiting using color copiers. On that same year, the name of the Old Legislative Building (Dating Gusali ng Batasan, with the name was located at the lower-left side) on the reverse side of the fifty-peso note was changed to the "National Museum" (Gusali ng Pambansang Museo) and the name was moved at the top of the building, to reflect the turnover made by the Congress of the Philippines to the National Museum. The name of the building's facade was changed from "Executive House" to "National Museum". Also, the serial number was moved at the top of the denomination that was located on the lower left side of the banknote.

The second major political upheaval, known as the Second EDSA Revolution in 2001, was depicted on the reverse side of the 200-peso banknote, showing Gloria Macapagal Arroyo being sworn into office at the EDSA Shrine. The obverse side of the banknote featured a portrait of her father, Diosdado Macapagal. The 200-peso note of the NDS was issued in 2002, making it the last denomination to be added to the series. It was also a commemorative banknote, released on June 12, 2002, to mark the 104th anniversary of Philippine independence. Its release also coincided with the 17th anniversary of the launch of the NDS and the five-peso note on June 12, 1985, which featured the Aguinaldo Shrine, was colored green, and remained in common circulation even after production ended in 1995, seven years before the 200-peso note was issued.

The 200-peso banknote drew criticism from the opposition, who argued that legal tender should feature only deceased national heroes, not a sitting president. However, this was not the first time a legal tender featured an incumbent president. Coins were minted to commemorate the inauguration of Manuel L. Quezon as President of the Philippines in 1935. During World War II, various provincial emergency currency boards issued notes bearing the image of then-President Quezon. In 1975, the BSP released a 5-peso coin featuring then-President Marcos. Former Presidents Fidel V. Ramos and Estrada also appeared on a limited commemorative 2,000-peso banknote issued to mark the 100th anniversary of Philippine independence. A limited commemorative 1,000-peso banknote featuring former President Estrada was also released for the same occasion. Additionally, every banknote series since 1935 has included the facsimile signature of the incumbent President of the Philippines.

The 100-peso banknote became the subject of controversy in 2005 after notes printed by Oberthur Technologies of France, intended for circulation during the Christmas season and featuring the signature of BSP Governor Amando Tetangco Jr., were released with a misspelling of the President's name, a first in Philippine history. The banknotes incorrectly spelled the name as "Gloria Macapagal-Arrovo" instead of the correct "Gloria Macapagal Arroyo." The incident quickly became the subject of public humor once it made national headlines. The BSP investigated the error and corrected it afterward.

The NDS banknotes were printed until 2013 (with the 5-peso note printed until 1995, the 10-peso note until 2001, the 20- and 1,000-peso notes until 2012, and the 50-, 100-, 200-, and 500-peso notes until 2013). They remained legal tender until December 31, 2015, and could be exchanged for newer notes until the larger commemorative banknotes were demonetized on August 2, 2019. The NDS coexisted with the New Generation Currency Series banknotes throughout the 2010s.

The main NDS notes ceased to be legal tender on January 1, 2016, and were demonetized two years later on January 3, 2018. The entire series, including the 2,000- and 100,000-peso commemorative banknotes, was officially demonetized on August 2, 2019, making the NDS series the longest-running banknote series with a liability under the BSP lasting 34 years.

== Banknotes ==
=== Released or circulated ===
New Design/BSP Series
Image		Value	Dimensions	Main Color	Design		Year	
Obverse	Reverse	Value	Dimensions	Main Color	Obverse	Reverse	First Issue	Withdrawal
		₱5	160 mm × 66 mm (6.3 in × 2.6 in)	Green and Brown	Emilio Aguinaldo, First Philippine Republic historical marker in Malolos Cathedral, cannon	Declaration of Philippine Independence, June 12, 1898	June 12, 1985	January 3, 2018
		₱10	160 mm × 66 mm (6.3 in × 2.6 in)	Brown, Teal, and Orange	Apolinario Mabini, Mabini's True Decalogue (El Decalogo Verdadero), quill and inkwell	Barasoain Church	July 1985	January 3, 2018
		₱10	160 mm × 66 mm (6.3 in × 2.6 in)	Brown and Teal	Apolinario Mabini, Andres Bonifacio, Mabini's True Decalogue (El Decalogo Verdadero), quill and inkwell, Kartilya ng Katipunan, Katipunan flag	Barasoain Church, Blood Compact of the Katipuneros	May 2, 1997	January 3, 2018
		₱20	160 mm × 66 mm (6.3 in × 2.6 in)	Orange and Blue	Manuel L. Quezon, Commonwealth of the Philippines coat-of-arms, 1935 Philippine Constitution, Filipino as the National Language	Malacañang Palace	January 1986	January 3, 2018
		₱50	160 mm × 66 mm (6.3 in × 2.6 in)	Red and Violet	Sergio Osmeña, Fuente Osmeña fountain in Cebu, gavel	National Museum (formerly Legislative Building)	April 18, 1987	January 3, 2018
		₱100	160 mm × 66 mm (6.3 in × 2.6 in)	Violet	Manuel A. Roxas, Inauguration of the Third Philippine Republic, July 4, 1946	Old and current headquarters of the Bangko Sentral ng Pilipinas in Manila	April 18, 1987	January 3, 2018
		₱200	160 mm × 66 mm (6.3 in × 2.6 in)	Green and Violet	Diosdado P. Macapagal, Aguinaldo Shrine in Kawit, Cavite	EDSA People Power 2001 and the inauguration of President Gloria Macapagal Arroyo	June 12, 2002	January 3, 2018
		₱500	160 mm × 66 mm (6.3 in × 2.6 in)	Yellow, Brown, Blue, Grey, and Black	Benigno S. Aquino Jr., BSAJ typewriter, His quotations of The Filipino is worth dying for and his signature Ninoy	Aquino as a journalist for the Manila Times holding a Rolleiflex camera (in front of an article about "1st Cav" and the Partition of Korea), Study Now, Pay Later education program, Concepcion, Tarlac town hall, Tarlac Provincial Capitol, 1986 People Power Revolution.	August 21, 1987	January 3, 2018
		₱1000	160 mm × 66 mm (6.3 in × 2.6 in)	Blue	José Abad Santos, Vicente Lim, Josefa Llanes Escoda, eternal flame at the Libingan ng mga Bayani, laurel wreath	Banaue Rice Terraces, Manunggul Jar cover and Langgal hut.	December 7, 1991	January 3, 2018
For table standards, see the banknote specification table.

=== Unreleased ===
Unreleased banknotes
Image		Value	Dimensions	Main Colour	Design		Year of First Issue	Usage in circulation
Obverse	Reverse	Value	Dimensions	Main Colour	Obverse	Reverse	Year of First Issue	Usage in circulation
		₱500	160 mm × 66 mm	White, Sky Blue, Brown, Orange, Green, Pink, Grey, and Black	Ferdinand E. Marcos, 1981–1986 Seal of the President of the Philippines, narra tree, basi, bundles of harvested rice stalks, indigenous weave design pattern from Ilocos region (Inabel)	Batasang Pambansa Complex, seal of the president of the Philippines (Marcos era), Some accomplishments of the Marcos administration especially during the New Society era (e.g. San Juanico Bridge, Angat Dam, BLISS Housing Project, Green Revolution agriculture)	1985 (scheduled)	2 million notes printed but not circulated upon destruction in 1986
For table standards, see the banknote specification table.

== Design of the banknotes ==
=== 5-peso banknote ===
Colored green, the 5-peso note was designed by Romeo Mananquil. The obverse side of the 5-peso banknote featured the portrait of Emilio Aguinaldo. On the right side of the banknote was the National Historical Commission of the Philippines (NHCP) historical marker in the Malolos Cathedral, along with a cannon. The reverse side of the banknote featured a depiction of the Philippine declaration of independence by Aguinaldo on June 12, 1898. Security features of the banknote included a security thread, scattered red & blue visible fibers, and fluorescent printing.

=== 10-peso banknote ===
Colored brown and teal, the 10-peso banknote, designed by Rafael Asuncion, was issued in July 1985, a month after the 5-peso banknote was issued. The obverse side of the 10-peso banknote featured Apolinario Mabini on the left and Andrés Bonifacio on the right. Bonifacio was the founder of the Katipunan, a secret society established to fight the Spanish colonial government. Mabini was the country's first Prime Minister and Secretary of Foreign Affairs. Depicted on the right side was one of the flags of the Katipunan as well as the manuscript of El Verdadero Decalogo (The True Decalogue). The reverse side of the banknote featured the Barasoain Church in Malolos, the site of the first Philippine Congress where the Malolos Constitution was drafted. The right portion depicted the initiation rites of the Katipunan. The design was previously used on the 5-peso "Pilipino" and "Ang Bagong Lipunan" series notes. From its introduction in July 1985 until May 1997, the 10-peso banknote only depicted Mabini and the Barasoain Church.

=== 20-peso banknote ===
The orange-colored 20 peso bill was designed by Angel Cacnio. The obverse side of the banknote featured Manuel L. Quezon, the first President of the Commonwealth of the Philippines. Along the right side of the banknote was the coat-of-arms of the Commonwealth, and two of Quezon's notable accomplishments. The first such accomplishment was "Wikang Pambansâ", which is Tagalog for "national language", as it was under his rule that a sole national language for the Philippines was adopted, largely based on Tagalog. The second accomplishment highlighted in the banknote was the "Saligang Batas 1935" or the 1935 Constitution of the Philippines. The reverse side of the 20-peso banknote depicted Malacañang Palace, the residence of the President of the Philippines, along the banks of the Pasig River. Quezon was the first Philippine President to live in the palace.

=== 50-peso banknote ===
Depicted on the front side of the 50-peso banknote was Sergio Osmeña, the second President of the Commonwealth of the Philippines. He served as president from 1944 to 1946, when the United States granted the country independence. The banknote was colored red and violet, and was designed by Rafael Asuncion. The National Museum was featured on the reverse side of the banknote.

=== 100-peso banknote ===
The banknote was predominantly colored violet and was designed by Angel Cacnio. The front side of the 100-peso banknote featured Manuel Roxas, the first President of independent Philippines. On the right side of the banknote, the Philippine flag was raised while the flag of the United States was lowered. The reverse side of the banknote depicted the Manila compound of the Bangko Sentral ng Pilipinas (BSP). The 100-peso banknote was the smallest-valued banknote to have the new security features implemented. On the reverse side, the top row of windows of the main building had the words "Bangko Sentral ng Pilipinas" running the whole length.

=== 200-peso banknote ===
Colored green and violet, the front side of the 200-peso banknote featured the portrait of Diosdado Macapagal. It also featured the Aguinaldo Shrine in Kawit, Cavite. The back side of the banknote featured a scene from the Second EDSA Revolution, with Gloria Macapagal Arroyo being sworn in as president by Chief Justice Hilario Davide Jr.. In the banknote, the little girl holding a Bible in between Arroyo and Davide is Cecilia Paz Razon Abad, daughter of Philippine Budget and Management Secretary Florencio Abad and Batanes Representative Henedina Abad.

=== 500-peso banknote ===
Colored yellow, blue, and black, the front side of the 500-peso banknote featured the portrait of Ninoy Aquino To the right of the banknote were two popular quotes from Aquino, those being "Faith in our people and faith in God", which is the excerpt from the 1983 undelivered speech upon his return from exile in United States (located above the signature of the Philippine President) and "The Filipino is worth dying for", which is the excerpt from his speech delivered before the Asia Society in New York City on August 4, 1980 (located above Aquino's signed nickname). Also included in the banknote was a signature of Aquino, a typewriter with his initials, as well as a dove of peace. A Philippine flag was placed to the right of his portrait. The reverse side of the banknote featured a collage of various images in relation to Aquino.

=== 1,000-peso banknote ===
Colored blue, the 1000-peso banknote was designed by Romeo Mananquil. The front side of the banknote featured the portraits of Chief Justice José Abad Santos, social worker Josefa Llanes Escoda, and army general Vicente Lim. The three are considered heroes of the resistance against the Japanese occupation of the Philippines. The banknote also featured the eternal flame at the Libingan ng mga Bayani, a laurel wreath, and the logo of the BSP. The back of the banknote featured the Banaue Rice Terraces and the Manunggul Jar. The words "Central Bank of the Philippines" were microprinted in the lower left border on the face of the note. Security features of the banknote included optically variable ink, a security thread, scattered red & blue visible fibers, and fluorescent printing.

== Coins ==
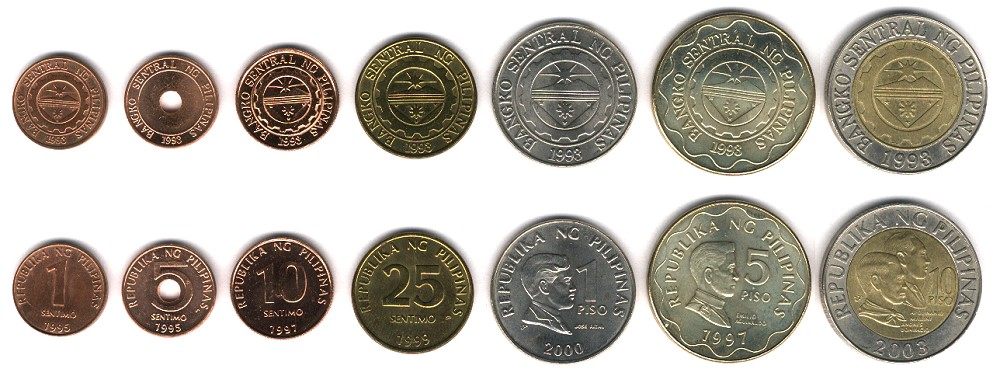
New Design Series coins.

BSP Coin Series (1995–2017)
Image		Face Value	Technical parameters				Description			Years of Issue	
Obverse	Reverse	Face Value	Diameter	Mass	Composition	Edge Thickness	Edge	Obverse	Reverse	Introduced	Withdrawn
		1¢	15.5 mm	2.0 g	Copper-plated steel	1.52 mm	Plain	"Republika ng Pilipinas", value, year of minting	1993 Logo of the Bangko Sentral ng Pilipinas	June 1995	
		5¢	15.5 mm	1.9 g	Copper-plated steel	1.52 mm	Plain (with 4 mm central hole)	"Republika ng Pilipinas", value, year of minting	Words "Bangko Sentral ng Pilipinas" along the border	June 1995	
		10¢	17.0 mm	2.5 g	Copper-plated steel	1.67 mm	Reeded	"Republika ng Pilipinas", value, year of minting	1993 Logo of the Bangko Sentral ng Pilipinas	June 1995	
		25¢	20.0 mm	3.8 g	Brass	1.5 mm	Plain	"Republika ng Pilipinas", value, year of minting	1993 Logo of the Bangko Sentral ng Pilipinas	June 1995	
		25¢	20.0 mm	3.6 g	Brass-plated steel	1.78 mm	Plain	"Republika ng Pilipinas", value, year of minting	1993 Logo of the Bangko Sentral ng Pilipinas	2003	
		₱1	24.0 mm	6.1 g	Copper-nickel	1.75 mm	Reeded	"Republika ng Pilipinas", Profile of José Rizal, value, year of minting	1993 Logo of the Bangko Sentral ng Pilipinas	June 1995	
		₱1	24.0 mm	5.35 g	Nickel-plated steel	1.9 mm	Reeded	"Republika ng Pilipinas", Profile of José Rizal, value, year of minting	1993 Logo of the Bangko Sentral ng Pilipinas	April 21, 2003	
		₱5	27.0 mm	7.7 g	Nickel-brass (70% copper 5.5% nickel 24.5% zinc)	1.87 mm	Plain	12-pointed scallop border design, "Republika ng Pilipinas", Profile of Emilio Aguinaldo, value, year of minting	12-pointed scallop border design, 1993 Logo of the Bangko Sentral ng Pilipinas	June 1995	
		₱10	26.5 mm	8.7 g	Ring: Copper-nickel	2.14 mm	Segmented (Plain and Reeded edges)	Ring: "Republika ng Pilipinas", year of minting	1993 Logo of the Bangko Sentral ng Pilipinas	2000	
		₱10	26.5 mm	8.7 g	Center: Aluminum-bronze	2.14 mm	Segmented (Plain and Reeded edges)	Center: Profiles of Andrés Bonifacio and Apolinario Mabini, value	1993 Logo of the Bangko Sentral ng Pilipinas	2000	
