= Philippine one hundred-peso note =

Denomination of Philippine currency

One hundred pesos
- Country: Philippines
- Value: ₱100
- Width: 160 mm
- Height: 66 mm
- Security features: Transparent window with mirrored denomination with Republika ng Pilipinas crest of arms in white and Bangko Sentral ng Pilipinas logo in white, transparent flower window with Bangko Sentral ng Pilipinas abbreviation visible at different angles, embossed eagle in transparent window, shadow thread of "BSP 100", raised ink (intaglio) printing
- Material used: Polypropylene
- Years of printing: 1903–1959, 1961–present

Obverse
- Design: Palawan peacock-pheasant
- Designer: Bangko Sentral ng Pilipinas in collaboration with Note Printing Australia
- Design date: 2024

Reverse
- Design: Mayon Volcano, whale shark (butanding) (Rhincodon typus), Bicol weave design
- Designer: Bangko Sentral ng Pilipinas in collaboration with Note Printing Australia
- Design date: 2017 (slightly changed to accommodate transparent polymer security windows in 2024)

The Philippine one hundred-peso note (Filipino: Sandaang Piso) (₱100) is a denomination of Philippine currency. The recently printed polymer version, first introduced in December 19, 2024 features the Palawan peacock-pheasant on its obverse side while its reverse side has similar design elements to the cotton-abacá version and it will be in circulation starting December 23, 2024, in limited quantities and in the Greater Manila area.

The old Philippine one hundred-peso note features former Philippine President Manuel A. Roxas on the front side of the bill, while the Mayon Volcano and the whale shark (locally known as butanding) are featured on the reverse side, which was slightly updated in the new polymer notes.

== History ==
=== Pre-independence ===
- 1852: Banco Español Filipino De Isabel II (present-day Bank of the Philippine Islands) issued notes.
- 1905-1916: Philippine Islands Silver Certificates issued with a portrait of Ferdinand Magellan.

	Series of 1905	Series of 1917
Obverse and Reverse		

- 1908: Banco Español Filipino issued notes (renamed in English to Bank of the Philippine Islands in 1912). Features a vignette of an Allegorical woman on the front.
- 1918 and 1929: Philippine Treasury Certificates issued with a portrait of Ferdinand Magellan.

	Series of 1918	Series of 1929
Obverse and Reverse		

- 1937: Philippine Commonwealth issued treasury certificates. Features the portrait of Ferdinand Magellan. This series were later overprinted with the word "VICTORY" after the liberation of the Philippines under Japanese rule in 1944.
- 1943: Japanese government issued series. Features the Rizal Monument on the right of the obverse, with the number "100" on the center. The banknotes ceased to be legal tender after the liberation.
- 1949: The 100-peso bill VICTORY SERIES CBP at BACK.

=== Version history ===
	Philippines (1936–1941)	Victory Series No. 66 (1944)	Victory-CBP Banknote Series (1949)
Obverse			
Reverse			

=== Independence ===
Roxas first appeared on the one hundred peso bill upon the release of the Pilipino series notes in 1967.

==== English series (1951–1974) ====
Features the portrait of Melchora Aquino, a Filipino revolutionary during the Philippine Revolution, who became known as "Tandang Sora". The reverse features the different flags used by the Katipunan movement.

==== Pilipino series (1969–1974) ====
In 1967, Manuel Roxas replaced the portrait of Melchora Aquino. The note is now predominantly violet in color. On the reverse, it now features the Central Bank of the Philippines main office before they were relocated to their current complex in Manila. The design of the obverse was later revised, the "100" on the lower right corner was moved higher, in turn placing the Central Bank logo below it, the signature of the Central Bank Governor was placed beside the signature of the President of the Philippines, the font for Republika ng Pilipinas and all of the "100" text were also changed and the text Sandaang Piso was made into one line. Geometric lines were also added on the sides and the watermark area of the note. This design was later used when the Bagong Lipunan series was released in 1973.

==== Ang Bagong Lipunan series (1973–1996) ====
In 1976, the "Ang Bagong Lipunan" text was added and was overprinted on the watermark area.

In 1978, the reverse was changed to reflect the Central Bank's transfer to its new complex in Manila.

==== New Design series (1987–2018) ====
In 1987, the note was completely redesigned and new elements regarding Roxas' tenure as the first president of the independent republic was shown on the lower right side where the Philippine flag was raised while the flag of the United States was lowered on July 4, 1946. The banknote was designed by Angel Cacnio.

After the creation of the "Bangko Sentral ng Pilipinas" in 1993, its new logo was incorporated on all the New Design series bills.

In 1998 starting with the first prefix letter "P" in red, the year of printing was added at the bottom of the denomination value located at the upper left corner of the obverse. The names of the signatories on the bills were later added beginning with banknotes featuring the signature of President Joseph Estrada.

Starting with banknotes featuring the signature of President Gloria Macapagal Arroyo on September 2001, additional security features were added: the security thread on the right side and the gold fluorescent printing on the left side across the portrait.

On banknotes with the signatures of President Gloria Macapagal Arroyo and BSP Governor Amando Tetangco Jr. from 2005 to 2010, there are two variants where the signatories are wide and lighter (which had been used on Arroyo and Tetangco's predecessor Rafael Buenaventura signatures from 2001 to 2004, and also on New Design Series' successors New Generation Currency and First Philippine Polymer Banknote Series since Tetangco), and narrow and darker. The former is used on banknotes issued on 2005 and some in 2008, while the latter one is used on notes from 2006 to 2010 and is also used on most banknotes issued in 2008.

==== New Generation series (2010–present) ====
In 2010, the portrait of Manuel A. Roxas was redesigned, a picture of the old Central Bank building and the inauguration of the Republic of the Philippines were added on the lower left corner and bottom center of the bill respectively. The reverse now features the Mayon Volcano and the whale shark.

In 2016, the color of the note was modified to have a stronger mauve or violet color. It was issued to address complaints that the color of the 100 peso note is almost indistinguishable with the 1000 peso note.

In 2017, an updated version of the New Generation series 100 piso banknote was issued with changes in the font size of the year of issue and the italicization of the scientific name on the reverse side.

In 2020, an enhanced version of the 100 peso banknote was released. It added color-changing indigenous patterns to the security threads. Also, four tactile marks were placed for the elderly and the visually impaired, two pairs on both the extreme left and right side of the front of the note.

The new BSP logo, which was redesigned in January 2021 was adopted in all NGC banknotes starting with the 2022 issued banknotes featuring the signatures of President Ferdinand Marcos Jr. and BSP Governor Felipe Medalla.

=== Version history ===
	English Series (1951–1971)	Pilipino Series (1969–1974)	Ang Bagong Lipunan Series (1973–1996)	New Design/BSP Series (1987–2018)	New Generation Currency Series (2010–present)
Obverse					
Reverse					

==== First Philippine Polymer series (2024–present) ====
100-Piso First Philippine Polymer series banknote
Image		Dimensions	Main Color	Design		Year of First Issue	Usage in circulation
Obverse	Reverse	Dimensions	Main Color	Obverse	Reverse	Year of First Issue	Usage in circulation
500 Philippine Pesos- Reverse	500 Philippine Pesos- Reverse	160 mm × 66 mm	Violet (mauve)	Palawan peacock-pheasant (Polyplectron napoleonis), Ceratocentron fesselii orchid	Mayon Volcano in Albay; Rhincodon typus, whale shark (butanding); Bicol textile design	December 19, 2024	In limited circulation
For table standards, see the banknote specification table.

== Design errors ==
The banknote became the subject of controversy in 2005 after banknotes printed by Oberthur Technologies of France in time for the Christmas season were printed with the President's name misspelled, the first in Philippine history. The banknotes spelled the President's name as "Gloria Macapagal-Arrovo" versus the correct Gloria Macapagal Arroyo. The incident was subsequently the subject of public humor as soon as the issue made national headlines. The BSP probed the mistake and corrected the error afterwards.

In December 2017, a 100 peso banknote which had no face of Manuel A. Roxas and no electrotype 100 was issued. The Facebook post was shared over 24,000 times. The BSP said that the banknotes are due to a rare misprint.

== Gallery ==
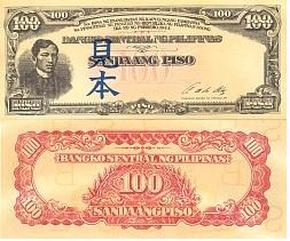
Detail of a 100 peso Rizal's front.

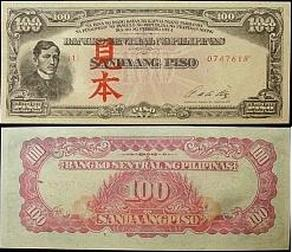
Ditto, but red.

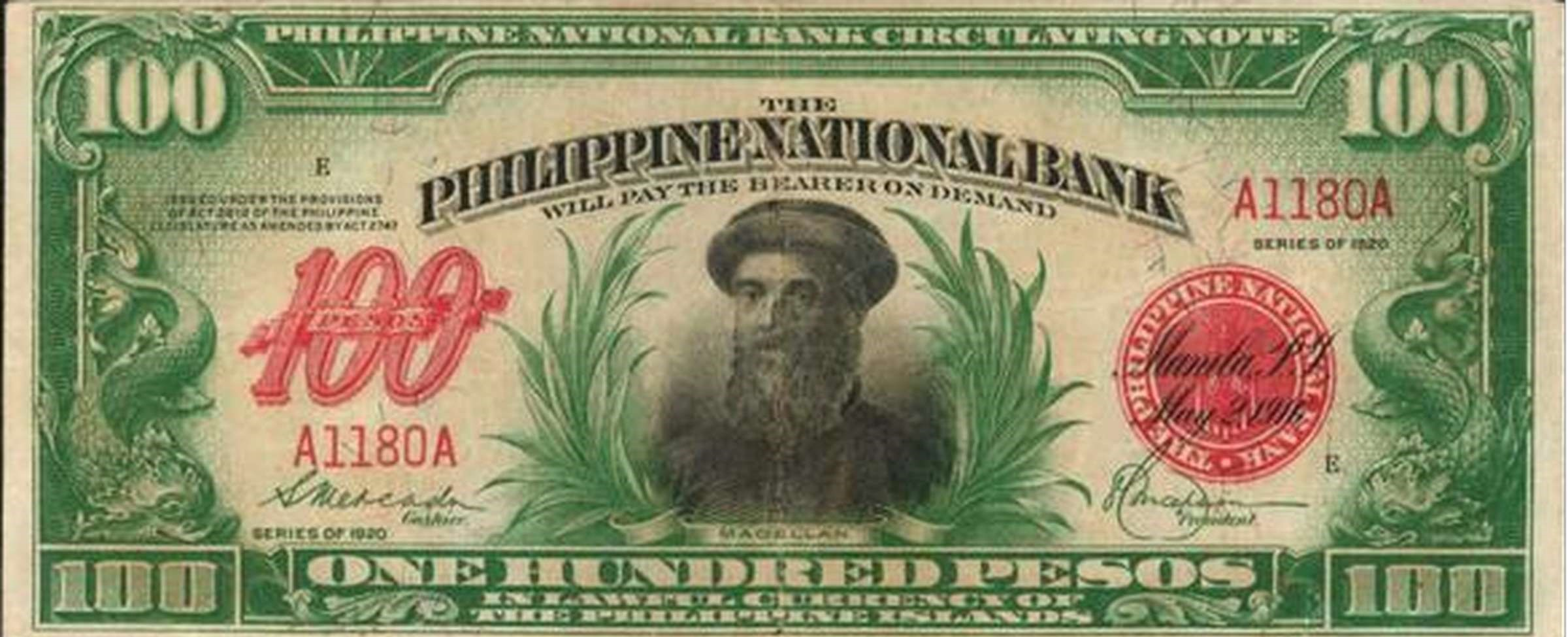
Image of a peso conant 100 peso bill with a Philippine National Bank.

== Commemorative issues ==
Throughout its existence, the one hundred peso bill have been overprinted to commemorate certain events, namely:

Philippine Centennial overprint.

- Philippine Centennial - In observance of the Centennial celebration of Philippine Independence, the BSP issued special editions of the 100 peso bill with an overprint of the Centennial logo in 1997. The second version, released in 1998, has a year mark (see picture on the right).
- UP Centennial - The Bangko Sentral ng Pilipinas had issued 100-Peso banknotes with an overprint of the iconic UP Oblation to commemorate the centennial of the University of the Philippines (UP) in 2008. Bangko Sentral printed 10 million pieces of the 100-Peso banknotes with the oblation overprint. At its launching, Bangko Sentral ng Pilipinas Governor Amando Tetangco Jr. presented to UP President Emerlinda Roman a whole sheet with 32 pieces of the 100-Peso UP centennial banknotes. According to Roman, the 4-piece uncut notes being sold for Php 1000 a set took P500 to produce, with the other Php 500 allotted for the development of UP.
- 60 years of Central Banking - On July 9, 2009, the Bangko Sentral ng Pilipinas introduced 12 million banknotes (2 million banknotes for each denomination) with an overprint commemorating 60 years of central banking. The overprint appears on the watermark area on all six circulating denominations.
- 100 Years of Lasallian Presence in the Philippines - Celebrating 100 years of existence of De La Salle Philippines. 1911–2011.
- 100 Years of UP College of Law Commemorative note - Celebrating 100 years of Excellence in Law 1911–2011.
- Ateneo Law School - In commemoration of the 75th year of the Ateneo Law School.
- Masonic centennial - First released as a numismatic product containing an uncut sheet of four notes, then released into general circulation. The overprint reads "Grand Lodge of Free and Accepted Masons, Philippines" with the group's logo and "100 Years".
- Manila Hotel 100 Years of Existence - Contains a green overprint on the watermark area that reads "Manila Hotel 100 Years".
- 20 Years of the Bangko Sentral ng Pilipinas: Financially Proper Toward the Development Commemorative note - Contains a commemorative overprint on the watermark area that reads "20 Years Bangko Sentral ng Pilipinas - Financially Proper Toward the Development - 1993-2013".
- National Year of Rice - Contains a black commemorative overprint on the watermark area that reads "National Year of Rice" and "2013 Sapat Na Bigas Kaya ng Pinas!".
- Iglesia ni Cristo 100 years Anniversary Commemorative note - Commemorative of Centennial Anniversary on July 27, 2014. 1914–2014.
- Shell Oil in the Philippines Commemorative note - Commemorating 100 years of Shell Oil in the Philippines. Contains a black overprint with the Shell Oil logo and the words "100 Taon (Years) 1914-2014".

== Printing years ==
Banknote series	Year	President of the Philippines	BSP Governor
English Series	1951	Elpidio Quirino	Miguel Cuaderno Sr.
Pilipino Series	1969–1970	Ferdinand E. Marcos	Alfonso Calalang
Pilipino Series	1970–1971	Ferdinand E. Marcos	Gregorio S. Licaros
Ang Bagong Lipunan Series	1973	Ferdinand E. Marcos	Alfonso Calalang
Ang Bagong Lipunan Series	1973–1981	Ferdinand E. Marcos	Gregorio S. Licaros
Ang Bagong Lipunan Series	1981–1984	Ferdinand E. Marcos	Jaime C. Laya
Ang Bagong Lipunan Series	1984–1985	Ferdinand E. Marcos	Jose B. Fernandez Jr.
New Design Series	1987–1990	Corazon C. Aquino	Jose B. Fernandez Jr.
New Design Series	1990–1992	Corazon C. Aquino	Jose L. Cuisia Jr.
New Design Series	1992–1993	Fidel V. Ramos	Jose L. Cuisia Jr.
New Design Series	1993–1998	Fidel V. Ramos	Gabriel C. Singson
New Design Series	1998–1999	Joseph Estrada	Gabriel C. Singson
New Design Series	1999–2001	Joseph Estrada	Rafael B. Buenaventura
New Design Series	2001–2004	Gloria Macapagal Arroyo	Rafael B. Buenaventura
New Design Series	2005–2010	Gloria Macapagal Arroyo	Amando M. Tetangco Jr.
New Design Series	2010–2013	Benigno S. Aquino III	Amando M. Tetangco Jr.
New Generation Currency Series	2010–2016	Benigno S. Aquino III	Amando M. Tetangco Jr.
New Generation Currency Series	2016–2017	Rodrigo Duterte	Amando M. Tetangco Jr.
New Generation Currency Series	2017–2019	Rodrigo Duterte	Nestor Espenilla Jr.
New Generation Currency Series	2019–2022	Rodrigo Duterte	Benjamin E. Diokno
New Generation Currency Series	2022–2023	Bongbong Marcos	Felipe M. Medalla
New Generation Currency Series	2024–present	Bongbong Marcos	Eli M. Remolona Jr.
First Philippine Polymer Series	2024–present	Bongbong Marcos	Eli M. Remolona Jr.
