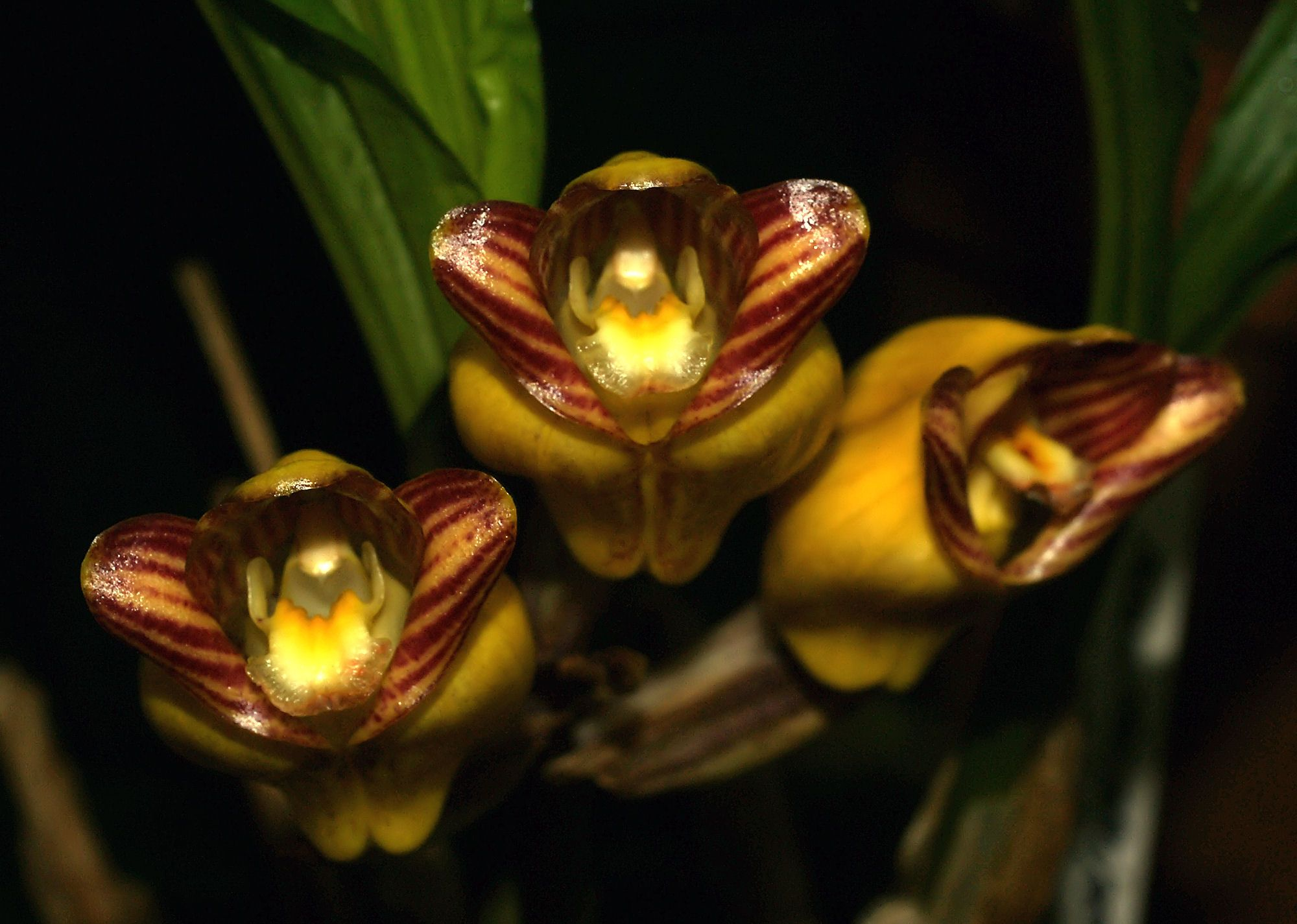

Scientific classification
- Kingdom: Plantae
- Clade: Tracheophytes
- Clade: Angiosperms
- Clade: Monocots
- Order: Asparagales
- Family: Orchidaceae
- Subfamily: Epidendroideae
- Genus: Acanthophippium
- Species: A. mantinianum

Binomial name
- Acanthophippium mantinianum Linden & Cogn.

= Acanthophippium mantinianum =

Species of orchid

Acanthophippium mantinianum or Mantin's acanthophippium, is a species of the family Orchidaceae. It is currently the only endemic Acanthophippium species known in the Philippines and one of the two species along with Acanthophippium pictum. It was named in honor of M. Georges Mantin, an orchid horticulturalist and hybridizer from Olivet, France. It is an erect and sympodial species with 15 cm long tapering pseudobulbs and large, thin leaves, which can be up to 60 cm long and 15 cm wide. The plant is endemic to the islands of Luzon, Leyte, Mindoro, Negros and Panay in the Philippines where it is found at elevations from 500 to 1500 meters.

== Gallery ==
Photos of Acanthophippium mantinianum

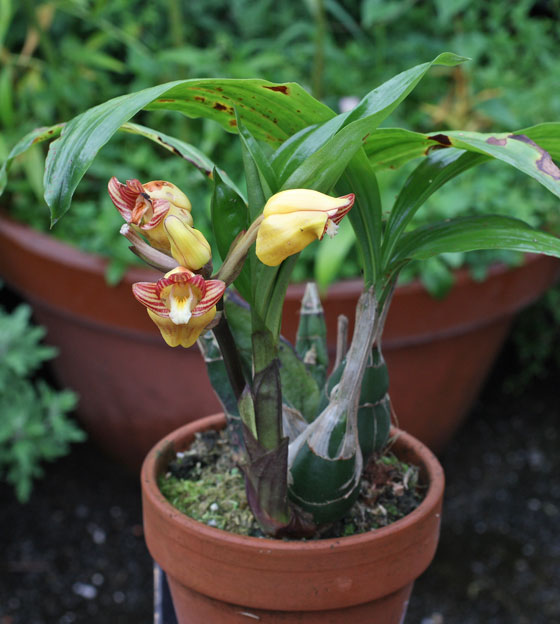
whole plant

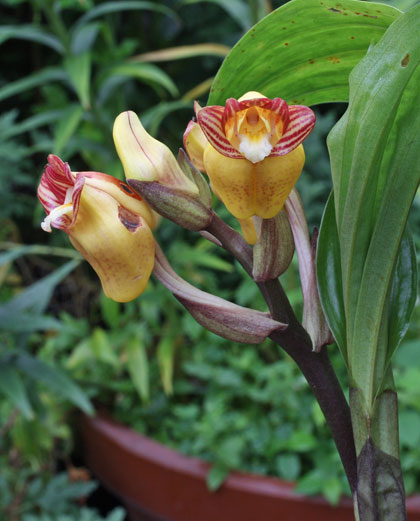
inflorescence

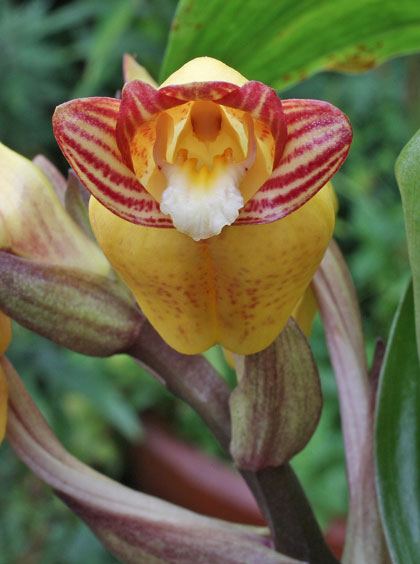
flower close-up
