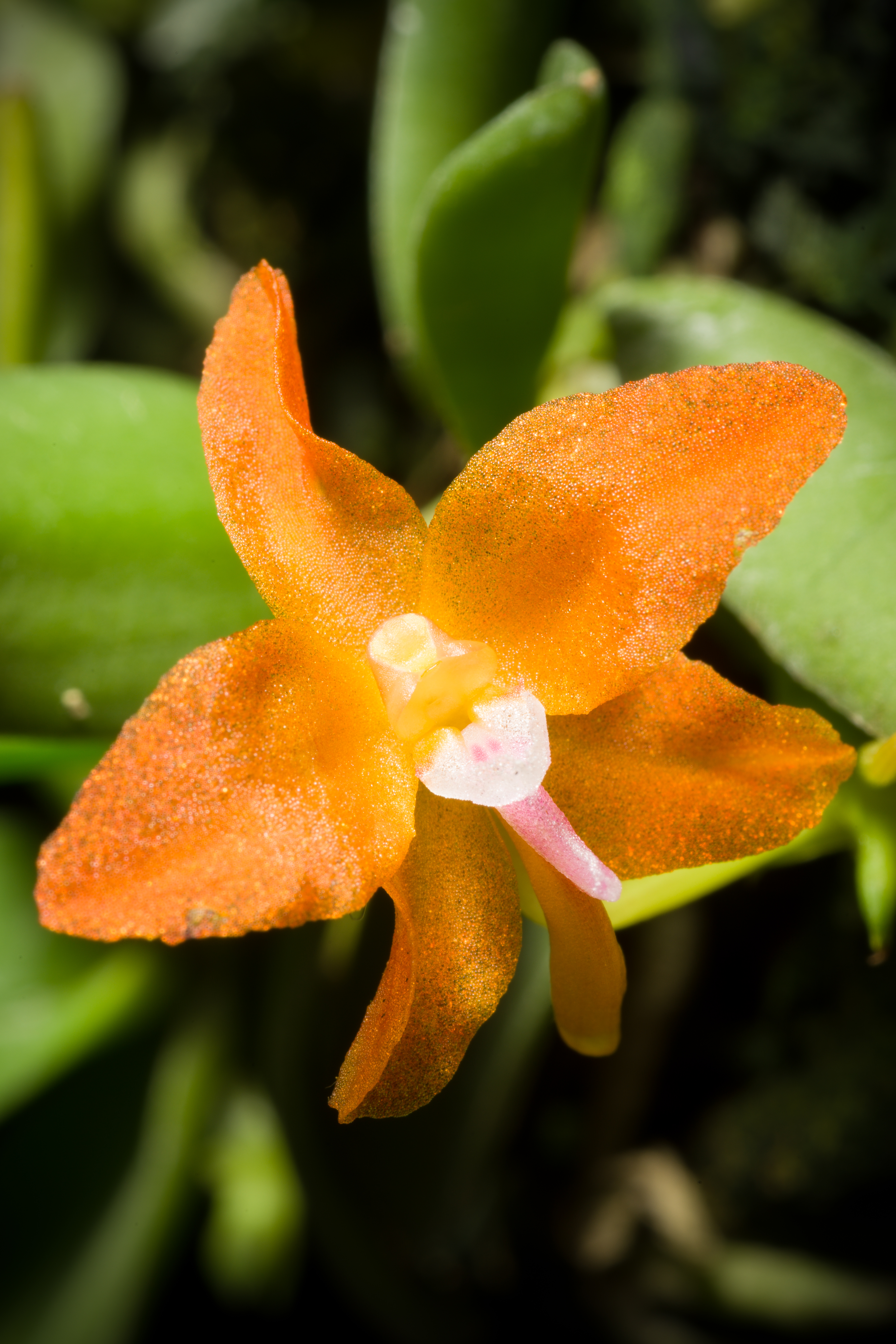

Conservation status
- Critically Endangered (IUCN 3.1)

Scientific classification
- Kingdom: Plantae
- Clade: Tracheophytes
- Clade: Angiosperms
- Clade: Monocots
- Order: Asparagales
- Family: Orchidaceae
- Subfamily: Epidendroideae
- Tribe: Vandeae
- Subtribe: Aeridinae
- Genus: Ceratocentron; Senghas
- Species: C. fesselii

Binomial name
- Ceratocentron fesselii Senghas

Synonyms
- Tuberolabium calcaratum T.Hashim.

= Ceratocentron =

Genus of orchids

Ceratocentron is a critically endangered monotypic genus of plants in the family Orchidaceae. It sole known species, Ceratocentron fesselii, is found at high altitudes from Nueva Vizcaya and Nueva Ecija to the Cordillera Mountain ranges on Luzon island in the Philippines. The holotype was discovered in northern Nueva Ecija. The species is rare in the wild, and remained unknown to science until 1989.

It is critically endangered due to habitat degradation and collecting. According to the IUCN, over-collecting to keep up with demand in the international orchid trade has led to its decline.
