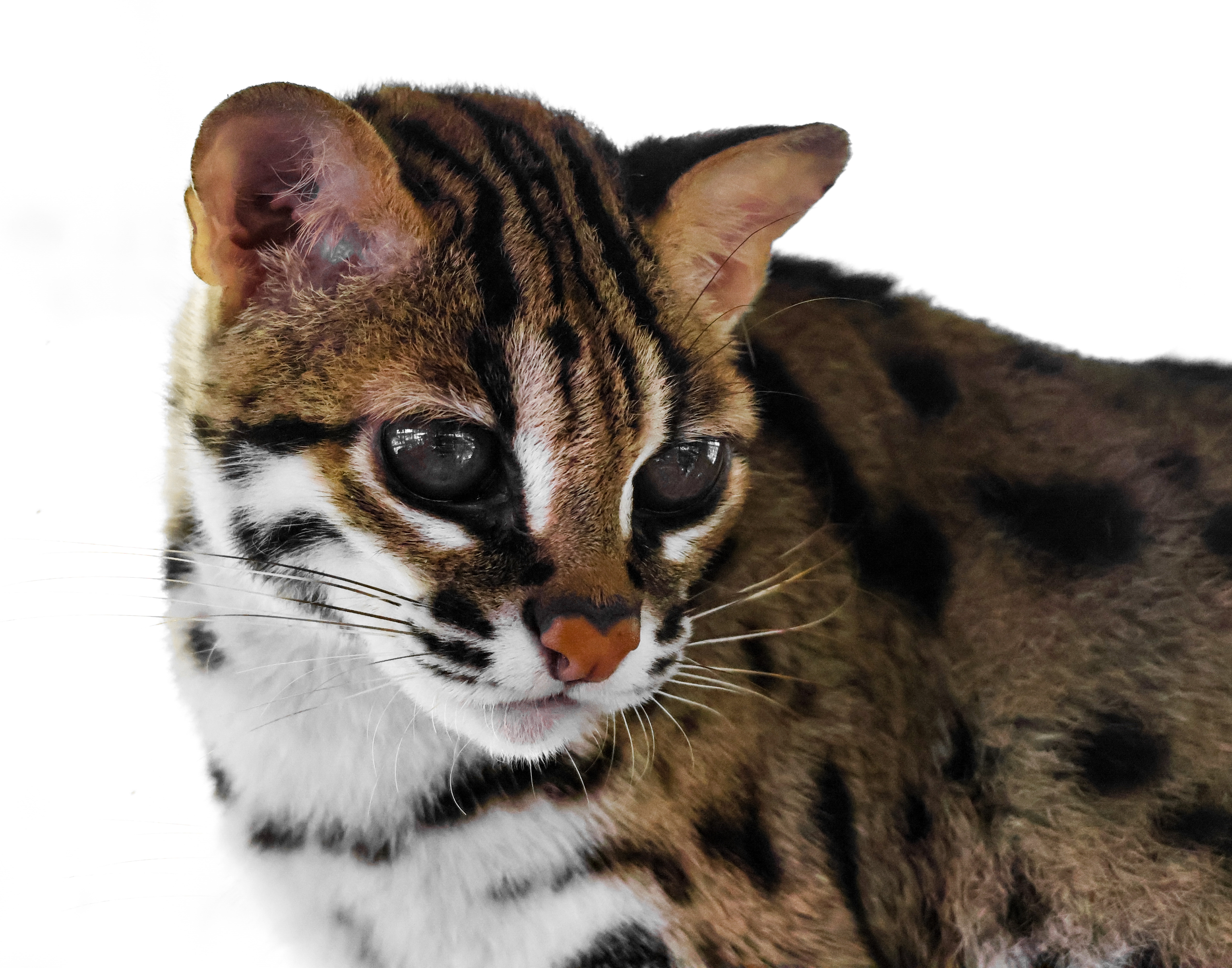

Scientific classification
- Kingdom: Animalia
- Phylum: Chordata
- Class: Mammalia
- Order: Carnivora
- Family: Felidae
- Genus: Prionailurus
- Species: P. javanensis
- Subspecies: P. j. sumatranus
- Population: Visayan leopard cat

= Visayan leopard cat =

Sunda leopard cat population in the Philippines

The Visayan leopard cat, known locally as maral, is a Sunda leopard cat (Prionailurus javanensis sumatranus) population in the Philippine Islands of Negros, Cebu and Panay. It has been listed as vulnerable on the IUCN Red List in 2008 under its former scientific name P. bengalensis rabori as its range is estimated to be less than 20,000 km^{2} (7,700 sq mi), and the population was thought to be decreasing.

== Taxonomy ==
Prionailurus bengalensis rabori was proposed in 1997 by anthropologist Colin Groves based on morphological analysis of a skin and skull. He considered it a leopard cat subspecies.

Results of phylogeographic research show that Sunda leopard cats from Borneo, Sumatra, and the Philippine islands are genetically very similar. The Sunda leopard cat probably reached the Philippine islands from Borneo after the eruption of Toba Volcano during the late Pleistocene glaciation. It has therefore been subsumed to P. javanensis sumatranus in 2017.

== Characteristics ==
The fur of the Visayan leopard cat is dark ochre to buffy fawn with large and dark spots. Its skull is a little narrower than that of the Sumatran leopard cat and Bornean leopard cat.

== Distribution and habitat ==
The Visayan leopard cat is endemic to the Philippine islands of Panay and Negros where it inhabits remnant forest fragments. In Cebu, it has also been recorded in sugarcane farms. It is probably locally extinct or close to extinction on the islands of Cebu and Masbate. Panay and Negros islands have lost 90%–95 % of their natural habitat.

== In captivity ==
Five Visayan leopard cats are housed at the Mariit Wildlife and Conservation Park at the West Visayas State University campus in Lambunao, Iloilo.
