= Note Printing Australia =

Subsidiary of the Reserve Bank of Australia

Coordinates: 37.612974°S 144.943453°E

- Type: Subsidiary
- Industry: Printing
- Founded: June 1, 1998; 28 years ago in Craigieburn, Australia
- Headquarters: 1/9 Potter Street, Craigieburn, Australia
- Area served: Australia
- Products: Bank notes; Passports
- Parent: Reserve Bank of Australia
- Website: www.noteprinting.com/history

Note Printing Australia (NPA) is a wholly owned subsidiary of the Reserve Bank of Australia (RBA) that produces banknotes and passports. It was corporatised in July 1998 and is located in Craigieburn, Melbourne. NPA has its origins as a subsidiary of the Commonwealth Bank and was established in 1913 to print banknotes for Australia. After printing paper banknotes for 75 years, NPA introduced the first polymer banknote technology in 1988. NPA print banknotes for several other countries as well as Australia due to the high standards of durability and difficulty of counterfeiting.

== NPA polymer banknotes ==
In the mid-1960s Australia was hit by forgeries of the newly introduced $10 paper decimal note. In response, the Reserve Bank of Australia and Note Printing Australia commissioned the CSIRO to find better ways to secure the Australian currency. This led to the development of the polymer banknote, which the NPA took into production and introduced in 1988. NPA has since focused heavily in promoting the benefits of the polymer technology they developed. According to internal RBA documents, NPA's printing costs in 2012 were 34¢ per note.

=== Use of polymer banknote technology in Australia and other countries ===
While NPA was initially involved in the production of the polymer substrate, a subsidiary company was created in 1996 that effectively removed NPA from this aspect of the banknote supply chain. Today, polymer substrate is manufactured in Australia by CCL Secure, which is wholly owned by CCL Industries, a Canadian publicly listed company. Polymer banknotes are now issued in more than 60 countries worldwide, including Canada.

Since 1988, NPA has printed more than 10 billion banknotes for 19 countries on more than 80 denominations. NPA has won numerous awards for its business and printing capability. In 2020, NPA won the Currency Services Award by the London-based industry organisation Central Banking and won a Printing Industry Craftsmanship Awards Gold Medal for the design and production of the Solomon Islands new $5 polymer banknote.

== Printing equipment ==
Note Printing Australia is a security printing facility, that uses a number of special printers not available to the general printing industry.

== 2014 mention in Victorian Supreme Court suppression order ==
NPA was mentioned in a leaked suppression order of the Supreme Court of Victoria in Melbourne. The order, by Justice Elizabeth Hollingworth, which forbids publication of corruption allegations against named government officials of Malaysia, Indonesia and Vietnam, includes a specific exemption allowing the Commonwealth Director of Public Prosecutions to pass banned information on to NPA.
