= Philippine ten-peso coin =

Second largest denomination coin of the Philippine peso

Ten pesos
- Philippines
- Value: 10.00 Philippine pesos
- Mass: 8.0 g
- Diameter: 27 mm
- Thickness: 2.05 mm
- Edge: Round/Segmented (Plain and Reeded sections) (Bi-metallic version); Reeded with edge inscription of "BANGKO SENTRAL NG PILIPINAS" in italics
- Composition: Nickel (1988); Bi-metallic (Cupronickel ring with an aluminum-bronze center plug) (2000–2017); Nickel-plated steel (2017–present)
- Years of minting: 1988; 2000–present

Obverse
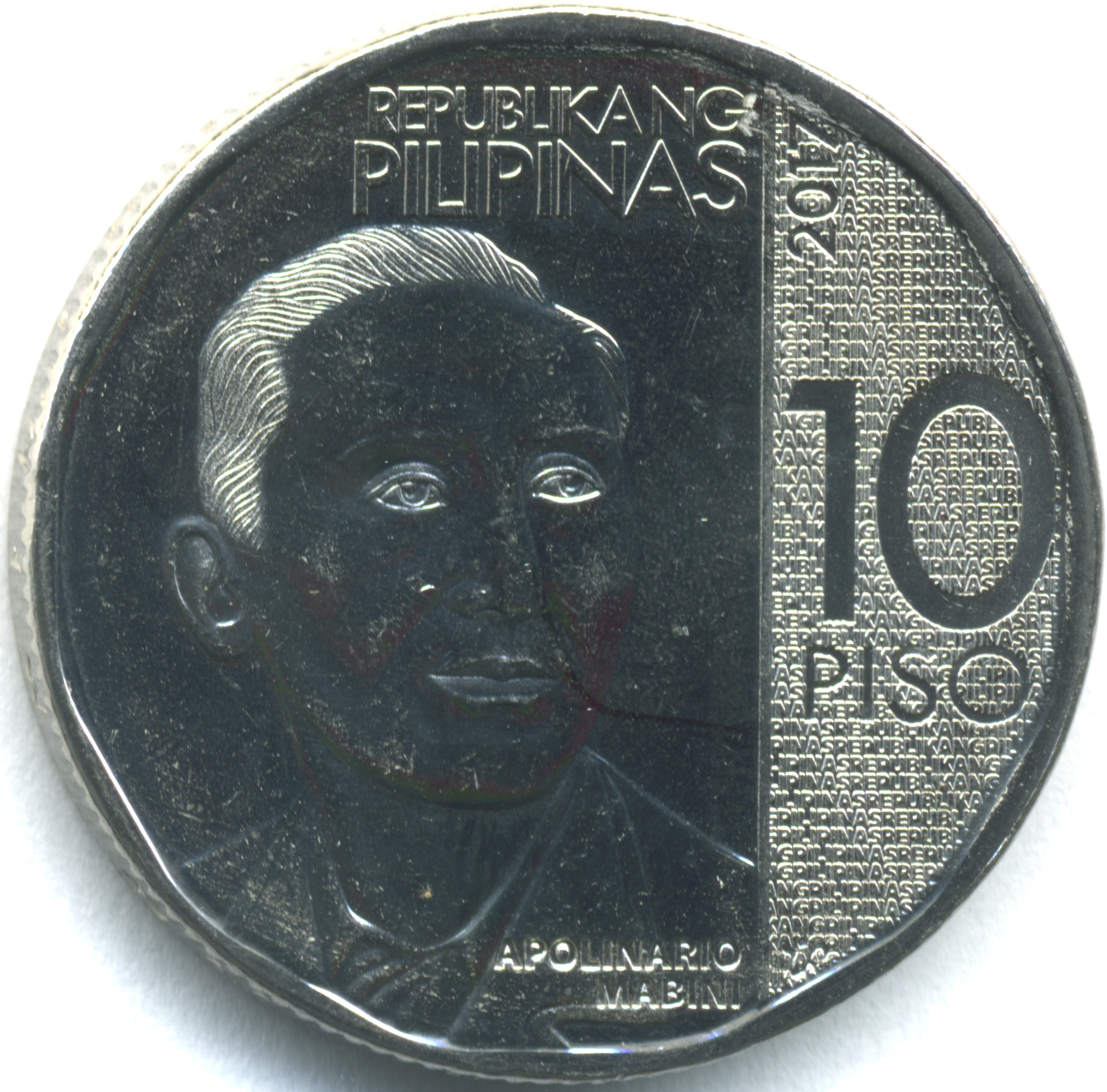
- Design: "Republika ng Pilipinas", Portrait of Apolinario Mabini; Value; Microprint of "Republika ng Pilipinas"; Year of minting; Mint mark
- Design date: 2017

Reverse
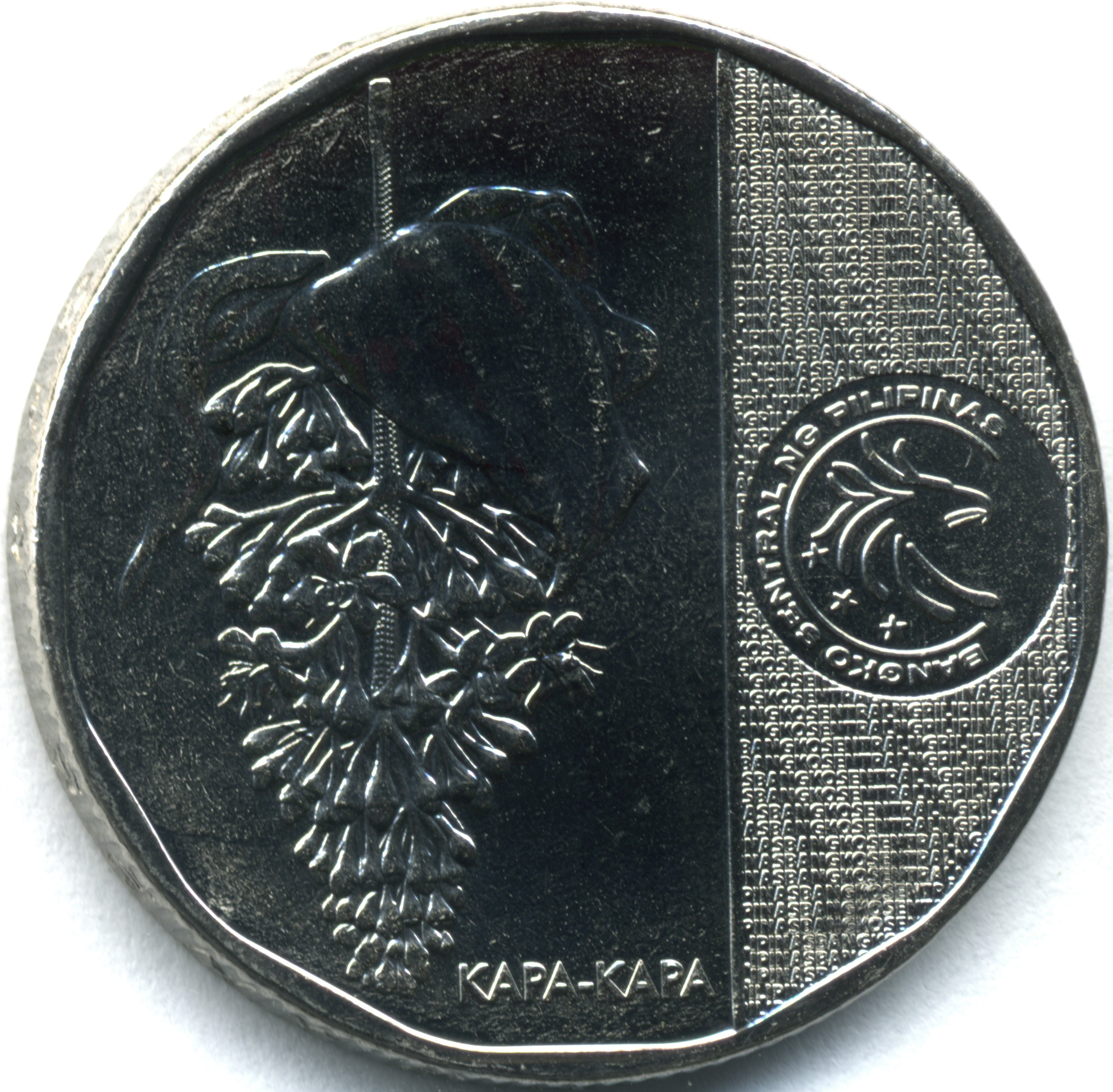
- Design: Medinilla magnifica (Kapa-kapa); logo of the Bangko Sentral ng Pilipinas; Microprint of "Bangko Sentral ng Pilipinas"; Microdots
- Design date: 2017

The Philippine ten-peso coin (₱10) is the second largest denomination coin of the Philippine peso.

Two versions of this denomination are in circulation; the bi-metallic coin, first issued in 2000, with the dual profiles of Andrés Bonifacio and Apolinario Mabini on the obverse and the 1993 logo of the Bangko Sentral ng Pilipinas on the reverse. The current version, issued since 2017, features a portrait of Apolinario Mabini on the obverse side and the Kapa-kapa and the current logo of the Bangko Sentral ng Pilipinas on the reverse side.

Firstly, the ten-peso coin was produced in conjunction with the ten-peso note, which commenced at the year 1988 and again from 2000 until production for its banknote version became obsolete when the Bangko Sentral ng Pilipinas (BSP) stopped printing the banknotes upon making the coin part of general public circulation in July 2001 due to the note's faster wear and tear from everyday use.

== Design ==
The coins are composed of nickel-plated steel. The diameter of the coins are 27 mm (1.1 in), and a mass of 8.0 grams (0.28 oz). The coins' edges are reeded with edge lettering. The obverse side of the coin features a portrait of only Apolinario Mabini, unlike before in the BSP Coin series which also featured a profile of Andrés Bonifacio alongside Mabini.

== History ==
=== Independence ===
==== BSP Coin Series ====
In 2000, BSP issued the 10-piso coin to commemorate the new millennium. It later became general circulation coin on July 16, 2001 for its 8th anniversary and to replace the 10-piso New Design/BSP Series banknote. It has the profiles of Andrés Bonifacio and Apolinario Mabini in a con-joint or in tandem manner on the obverse side. The reverse side bears the seal of the Bangko Sentral ng Pilipinas which is consistent with the common reverse design of the other six denominations. This has been an additional denomination to the current coin circulation.

==== New Generation Currency Coin Series ====
Issued in 2017, the ten piso coin features a portrait of Apolinario Mabini, the denomination and year of issue on the obverse. The reverse side features the Kapa-kapa (Medinilla magnifica) flower and the current logo of the Bangko Sentral ng Pilipinas.

=== Version history ===
	BSP Coin Series (2000–2017)	New Generation Currency Coin Series (2017–present)
Obverse		
Reverse		

== Commemorative coins ==
Twelve years before the BSP Series version of the coin was released in 2000, Bangko Sentral ng Pilipinas (BSP) issued a commemorative ten peso coin in 1988 to commemorate the 1986 People Power Revolution. It had a nickel composition.

BSP also released a commemorative ten peso coin on December 18, 2013, to commemorate the 150th Birth Anniversary of the leader of Katipunan, Andrés Bonifacio.

On December 19, 2014, the Bangko Sentral ng Pilipinas (BSP) published an announcement that three new limited edition, commemorative circulation coins, including Apolinario Mabini 150th anniversary commemorative 10 peso coin, which was released three days later. Another commemorative coin was released on December 22, 2015, commemorating the 150th birth anniversary of Miguel Malvar.

== See also ==
- Philippine ten-peso note
