= Women's suffrage in the Philippines =

Philippine movement for women's voting rights

A movement to fight for women's right to vote in the Philippines started as early as the 1890s during the Philippine Revolution and persisted during the United States administration of the islands.

Women's suffrage was first granted in 1933 through Act No. 4112 but was revoked with the adoption of the 1935 Constitution. Women were only able to practice their right to vote in the 1935 plebiscite which ratified the constitution.

The women's suffrage movement succeeded after Filipina women granted it to themselves in a 1937 national plebiscite.

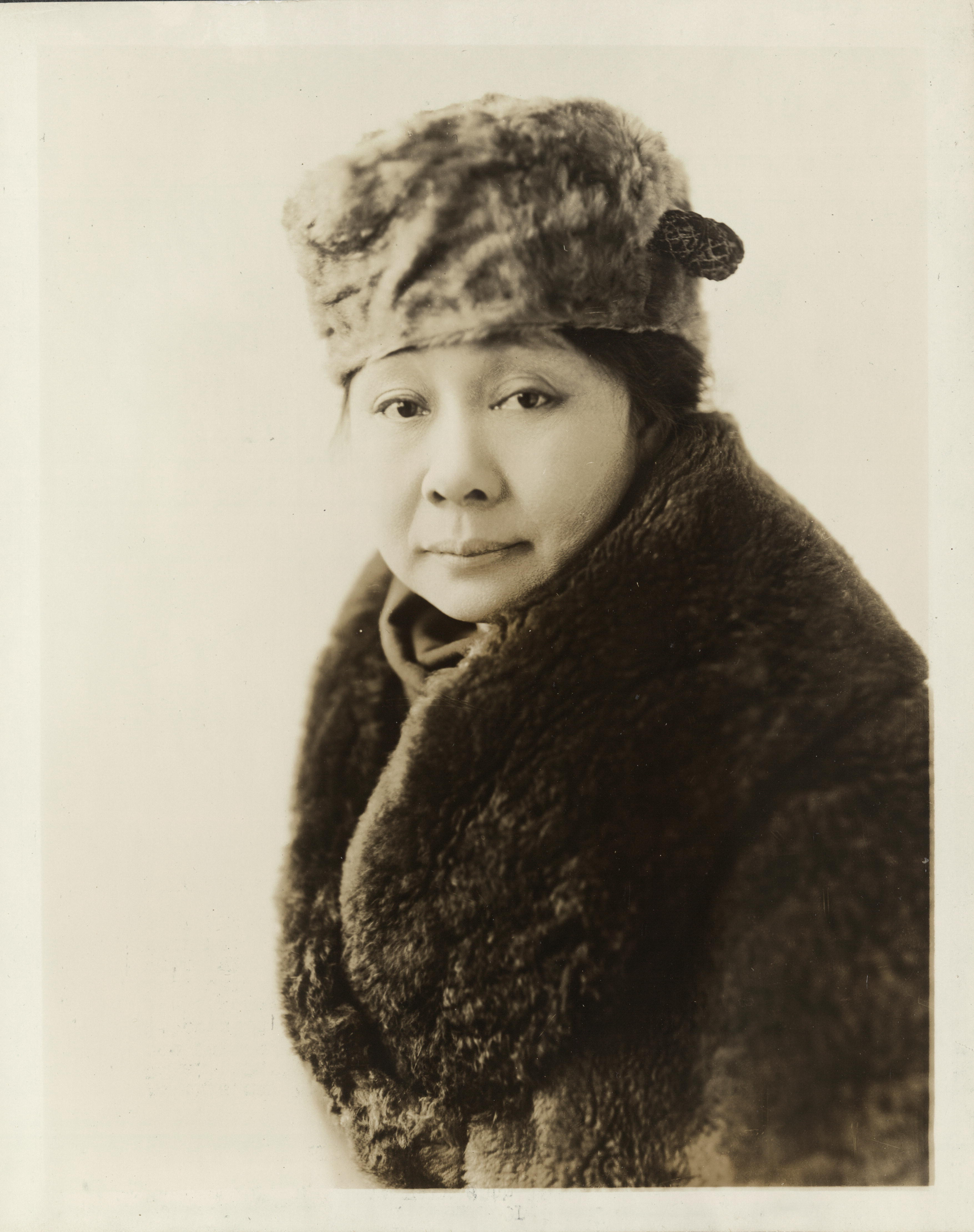
1921 portrait of Madame De Veyra, President of the Woman's Club of Manila which supported the suffrage movement for women of the Philippines.

== History ==
=== Early efforts ===
Filipino revolutionaries wrote a constitution for the Philippines during the Malolos Congress from 1898 to 1899. Apolinario Mabini in particular included a provision to grant women right to vote in his draft. However the Malolos Constitution as adopted did not include this provision.

Under the United States administration of the Philippines, the question of women's suffrage for Filipina women continued. Suffragist Pura Villanueva Kalaw credits Cebu Congressman Filemon Sotto as the first politician to file a bill for women's suffrage in 1907 during the First Philippine Assembly. It did not pass and opposition was concerned that it might be detrimental to "family values".

According to historian Encarnacion Alzona it was Melecio Severino in the Third Philippine Assembly who filed the first bill in 1912.

It was upper and middle class Filipina women who led the campaign for women's suffrage in the Philippines. They also had help from American suffragist women and sympathetic American colonial officials including Governor Generals Francis Burton Harrison, and Leonard Wood.

The first bill was passed in the upper house in 1920. But no women's suffrage bill would become law until the 1930s. While Dwight F. Davis and Theodore Roosevelt Jr. has supported greater civil rights for women and have indicated that they would sign a suffrage bill if needed; neither advocated specifically for women's suffrage deferring the issue to the Philippine legislature.

American U.S. House of Representatives member Charles L. Underhill of the Republican Party filed a bill granting women's suffrage in the Philippine islands. Rosa Sevilla de Alvero did not support the bill preferring women's suffrage will be granted via the Philippine legislature and was suspicious of American motives.

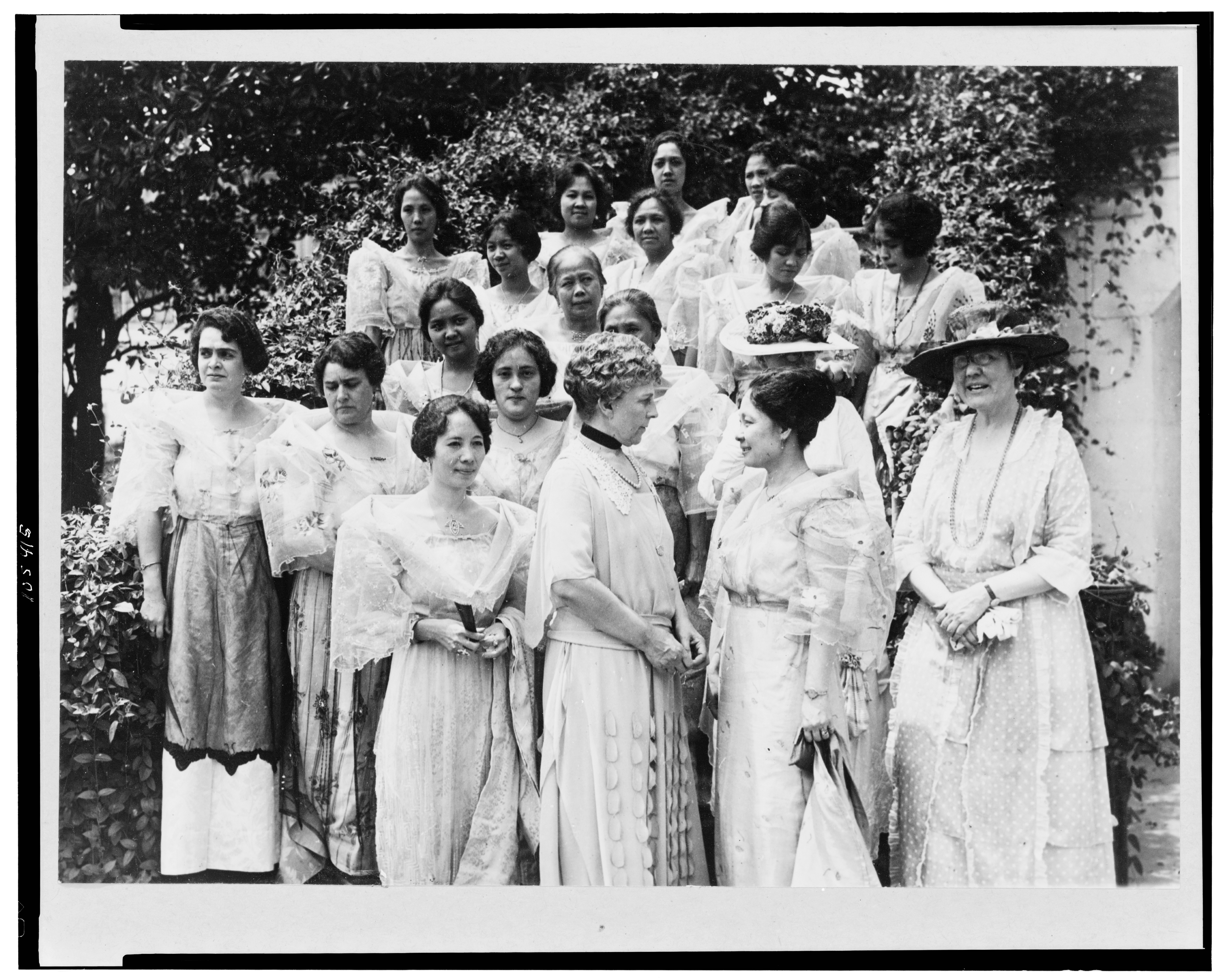
Sofia Reyes de Veyra and fellow Filipinas received at White House by First Lady Florence Harding. Upon returning to the Philippines, these women formed women's clubs to win the right to vote.

=== Act No. 4112 ===
It was only in 1933, when Act No. 4112, which amended the Administrative Code to grant women's suffrage was passed by both chambers and became law. This came after pressure imposed by Governor General Frank Murphy who refused to sign a law unless the Philippine legislature passes a bill on women's suffrage. Murphy signed the bill on December 7, 1933 and became effective January 1, 1935.

Despite women's suffrage being de jure granted it was never exercised for a regular election under Act No. 4112. Women were still not allowed to vote in the 1934 Philippine Senate elections.

=== 1935 Constitution ===
In the 1934 Philippine Constitutional Convention, women's suffrage was a contentious topic during the drafting of a new Constitution of the Philippines. The provision for qualified voters read as "male citizens of the Philippines, unless disqualified by law, of 21 years of age and above, able to read and write are eligible for suffrage". The constitution draft was ratified in the 1935 plebiscite effectively repealing de jure women's suffrage granted by Act No. 4112. Around 200,000 women were among those who took part in the plebiscite to ratify the new constitution. The voting behavior of women was explained by suffragist Paz Policarpio-Mendez as the movement prioritizing Filipino nationhood over their sectoral interests.

However a compromise provision was also included in the same 1935 Constitution, it allows for the granting of women's suffrage if at least 300,000 qualified women choose to affirmatively vote in a plebiscite to be held within two years after the adoption of the constitution.

The 1935 Constitution was the charter for the Commonwealth of the Philippines. The 1935 elections was solely participated by men.

=== 1937 suffrage plebiscite ===
The National Assembly passed Commonwealth Act No. 34 on September 30, 1936 which scheduled the women's suffrage plebiscite mentioned in the 1935 Constitution.

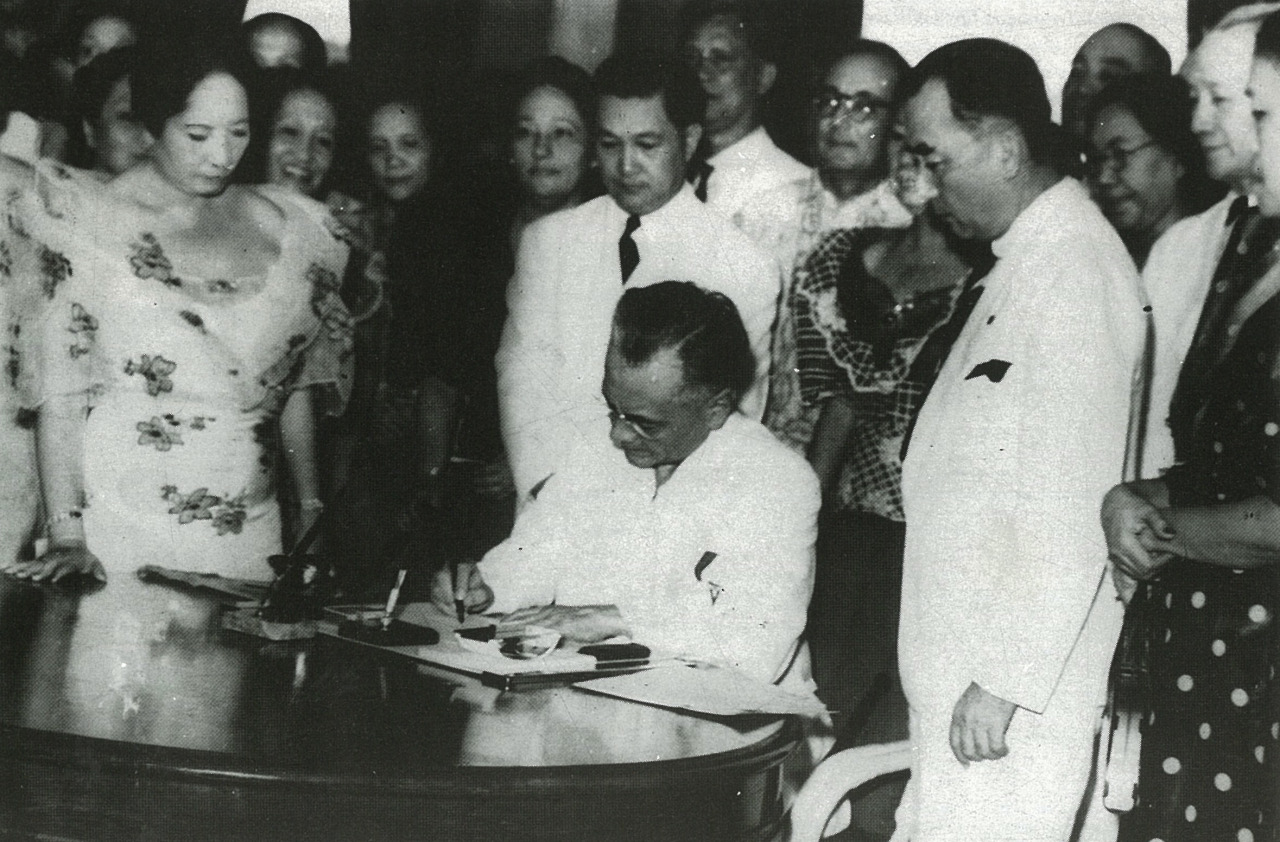
Philippine President Manuel L. Quezon (center) signing the Women’s Suffrage Bill following the 1937 plebiscite.

During the 1937 women's suffrage plebiscite held on April 30, 1937, 447,725 women voted "yes" and therefore the women granted themselves suffrage since it satisfies the minimum 300,000 affirmative votes set in the 1935 Constitution. Only 44,307 voted "no".

== Views on women's suffrage ==
=== Opposition ===
The prospect of women's suffrage in the Philippines was opposed by conservatives. The most common argument was that women themselves allegedly do not want women's suffrage, a stance held by Manuel Quezon. Skepticism on women's ability to participate in politics was also a factor.

Anti-suffragist also argued that granting women the right to vote would be detrimental to "family unity" since it would diminish the power of the husband in the social unit.

=== Support ===
Women's suffrage organizations and male allies dispute the claim that women do not want suffrage. Senator Rafael Palma argued that women's suffrage is a moral right not unlike to women's right to education.

Pilar Hidalgo-Lim says that women's suffrage is a prerequisite to Philippine independence. Josefa Llanes Escoda frames it as allowing women to fulfill their traditional roles as wives; that participating in elections is a valid method of helping their husbands. Maria Paz Mendoza Guanzon, a doctor by profession, pointed out how her male servants have the right to vote while she did not at the time. This challenged the notion that men are inherently more qualified to vote than women.

== Women's suffragists ==
=== Individuals ===
- Josepha Abiertas
- Encarnación Alzona
- Engracia Cruz-Reyes
- Josefa Llanes Escoda
- Concepción Felix
- Pura Villanueva Kalaw
- Trinidad Legarda
- Pilar Hidalgo-Lim
- Josefa Jara Martinez
- Elisa Ochoa
- Aurora Quezon

=== Organizations ===
- Asociación Feminista Filipina
- Asociacion Feminista Ilongga
- League of Women Voters
- Society for the Advancement of Women / Women's Club of Manila
