= Concepción Felix =

Filipina feminist and human rights activist

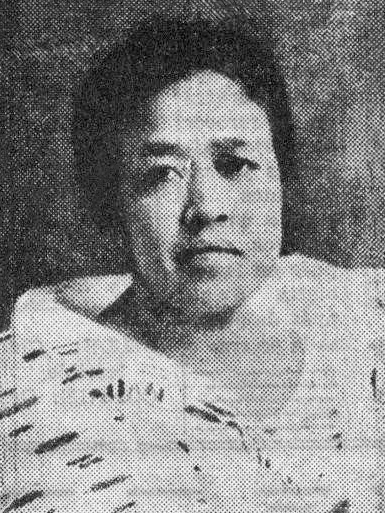
- Born: Concepción Felix Roque; 9 February 1884; Tondo, Manila, Captaincy General of the Philippines, Spanish Empire
- Died: 26 January 1967 (aged 82)
- Other names: Concepción Felix de Calderón, Concepción Felix de Rodriguez, Concha Felix de Calderón, Concepción Felix-Rodriguez
- Occupations: social worker, suffrage activist
- Years active: 1905–1940
- Spouse(s): Felipe Gonzáles Calderón Roca (m. 1907); Domingo Rodriguez (m. 20 June 1929)

Concepción Felix Roque (9 February 1884 – 26 January 1967) was a Filipina feminist and human rights activist. She established one of the first women's organizations in the Philippines, Asociación Feminista Filipina, as well as one of the first humanitarian NGOs, La Gota de Leche, aimed specifically at the well-being of mothers and their children. On several occasions, she spoke to legislators to promote women's enfranchisement. She has been recognized as one of the first feminists of the Philippines and was honored with many awards.

== Biography ==
Concepción Felix Roque was born on 9 February 1884 in Tondo, Manila, Philippines, to Juana Roque and Mauricio Felix. At age six, she began her schooling in a private institution run by Margarita Lopez. In 1893 she transferred to the newly opened Assumption Convent. Finishing her primary education, Felix attended the Instituto de Mujeres (Women's Institute), earning her teaching degree. She continued her studies while teaching math classes, earning her bachelor's degree in 1904. She went on to study law at the Escuela de Derecho (Law School) in Manila. The school had been founded by Felipe Gonzáles Calderón Roca, who drafted the Malolos Constitution and who had been acting as a private tutor to Felix. She was one of the first four women admitted to the law school and became one of the first women admitted to the bar association.

== Suffrage and social work ==
In 1905, Felix founded the Asociación Feminista Filipina (Feminist Association of the Philippines) as a volunteer social reform group aimed at acquiring prison and labor reform for women and children. Like many of the 19th-century purity organizations, it sponsored drives against drinking, gambling, and prostitution and implemented moral campaigns in schools and factories with lectures on hygiene, health, and infant care. It also campaigned for inclusion of women on local boards of education and municipal committees, though at this early stage, Felix was not demanding suffrage. Recognizing that women did not have a legal identity, Felix gained the backing of a group of male doctors who incorporated one of the first non-profit organizations in the country, La Protección de la Infancia, Inc. Through the organization in 1907, Felix founded La Gota de Leche, the first organization aimed solely at the welfare of mothers and children. Felix's idea was to establish a small maternity ward to train nurses and distribute sterile milk to sickly and malnourished infants. By 1909, the organization was so successful that it had to obtain a larger space and Felix spearheaded a successful drive to raise funds to purchase sterilizing equipment for the newly donated facility.

In 1912, following a visit by Carrie Chapman Catt, Felix and Pura Villanueva Kalaw joined with other women to form an organization called the Society for the Advancement of Women. Catt called them reluctant suffragists, but the women were laying the groundwork in civic and social programs. Gradually the women became more political, and by 1920 suffrage became a plank on the agenda of the Philippine Association of University Women. In that year, Felix was one of three Filipina women who spoke to lawmakers when they presented a petition for suffrage signed by 18,000 women. In 1933, a bill was passed giving women the right to vote, but a technicality which created the Philippine Commonwealth required that the process start over again. Continuing in the fight, along with Pilar Hidalgo-Lim, Josefa Llanes Escoda, Maria Paz Mendoza-Guazon, Constancia Poblete, Rosa Sevilla de Alvero, and Pura Villanueva Kalaw, Felix lobbied during the 1934 Philippine Constitutional Convention for women's suffrage. The 1935 Constitution provided in Article V provisions for women to gain the right to vote if they were successful in attaining an affirmation of 300,000 qualified women in a special plebiscite. The Philippine women's suffrage plebiscite held on 30 April 1937 was a landslide victory for women.

== Personal life ==
Felix married Felipe Calderón in 1907. They had one daughter, Concepción Calderón. Calderón died in 1908 and Felix remarried to the widower Domingo Rodriguez on 20 June 1929, with whom she had no children.

Felix died on 27 January 1967.

== Awards and honors ==
In 1948, Felix-Rodriguez received the Republic Medal of Merit and a diploma of honor, and the following year was recognized for her human rights work by UNESCO. In 1956, she was awarded the Pro Ecclesia et Pontifice by Pope Pius XII for her work with the Catholic Women's League. Felix was the first recipient of the Josefa Llanes Escoda Medal when that award was established by the National Federation of Women's Clubs, and the first recipient of the Carrie Chapman Catt Award by the Manila Women's Club. During the 1966 Women's Rights Day celebrations, Felix was awarded the Presidential Medal by Ferdinand Marcos. In 1984, a commemorative stamp bearing her likeness was issued.

== Sources ==
- Casares, J.B. (16 October 2010). "Filipina legal trailblazers". Pilipino Express. Winnipeg, Manitoba, Canada.
- Hackett, Bessie (1940). "The Changing Filipina". The Filipino Nurse. 15–16. Manila, Philippines: Filipino Nurses' Association: 23–25.
- Jimenez-David, Rina (28 April 2004). "A Century of Struggle". Philippine Daily Inquirer. Manila, Philippines.
- Lanzona, Vina A. (2009). Amazons of the Huk Rebellion: Gender, Sex, and Revolution in the Philippines. Madison, Wisconsin: university of Wisconsin Press. ISBN 978-0-299-23093-7.
- Malcolm, George A. (March 1921). "The Malolos Constitution". Political Science Quarterly. 36 (1). New York, New York: Academy of Political Science: 91–103. ISSN 0032-3195. JSTOR 2142663.
- McFerson, Hazel M. (2002). Mixed Blessing: The Impact of the American Colonial Experience on Politics and Society in the Philippines. Westport, Connecticut: Greenwood Publishing Group. ISBN 978-0-313-30791-1.
- Quirino, Carlos (1995). "Rodriguez, Concepcion Felix". Who's Who in Philippine History. Manila: Tahanan Books. p. 79. ISBN 978-971-630-046-8.
- San Jose, Ramon R. (September 1917). "The Manila Bar" (PDF). Philippine Law Journal. IV (2). Manila, Philippines: 25–40.
- Sobritchea, Carolyn I. (2004). Gender, Culture & Society: Selected Readings in Women's Studies in the Philippines. Seoul, South Korea: Ewha Womans University Press. ISBN 978-89-7300-594-9.
- Subido, Tarrosa (1955). The Feminist Movement in the Philippines, 1905–1955. National Federation of Women's Clubs.
- Varias-de Guzman, Jovita (1967). Women of distinction: biographical essays on outstanding Filipino women of the past and the present. Philippines: Bukang Liwayway.
- "Concepcion Felix de Calderon". Topical Philippines. 2011.
- "Concepcion Felix Vda. de Rodriguez, plaintiff-appellant, vs. Geronimo Rodriguez., et al., defendants-appellees". Manila, Philippines: Republic of the Philippines Supreme Court. 31 July 1967. G.R. No. L-23002.
- "Good Work among Filipinos". The Leavenworth Times. Leavenworth, Kansas. 17 March 1909 – via Newspapers.com.
- "Great Achievers". Philippine Daily Inquirer. Manila, Philippines. 15 September 2005.
- "Make Progress in Philippine Islands". The Waterloo Press. Waterloo, Indiana. 22 January 1920 – via Newspapers.com.
- "Remarkable Success". The Oregon Daily Journal. Portland, Oregon. 30 January 1910 – via Newspapers.com.
