= Simeon de Jesus =

Filipino Intelligence Officer

Simeon De Jesus
- Born: Simeon De Jesus y Paras; September 3, 1894; Arayat, Pampanga, Captaincy General of the Philippines
- Died: October 28, 1944 (aged 50); Fort Santiago, Manila, Philippines
- Cause of death: Executed by Japanese
- Burial place: Fort Santiago
- Alma mater: Philippine Constabulary Academy (now Philippine Military Academy); Wright Institute
- Relatives: Venancio De Jesus (Father); Diega Paras (Mother)
- Military career
- Allegiance: United States Army; (Philippines) Philippine Commonwealth Army
- Branch: Philippine Army; Philippine Constabulary
- Service years: 1916 - 1944
- Rank: Brigadier General
- Unit: 51st Provisional Infantry Brigade
- Commands: Military Intelligence Service; 51st Provisional Brigade; Deputy Chief of Staff Philippine Army
- Known for: Deputy Chief of Staff
- Conflicts: Battle of Bataan
- Awards: Distinguished Service Cross
- Other work: Chief of Veterans (1944); Chief of the Division of Rehabilitation of Bureau of Public Welfare (1943)

Simeon De Jesus (1894–1944), is a Filipino Intelligence Officer who served the Philippine Constabulary and Philippine Commonwealth Army. He was appointed by President Manuel Quezon to replaced Brigadier General Vicente Lim as Deputy Chief of Staff in 1941 who resigned to command in the field during World War II. He was released from POW camp in August 1942 after US-Filipino forces surrendered in Bataan. He served again in the Japanese backed Government, but continued to support the guerilla movement. he was captured and was tortured and executed September 1944.

== Military service ==
De Jesus was a teacher in 1914 when he opted for military service. He attended Philippine Constabulary Academy (now Philippine Military Academy) and graduated in 1916. He was commissioned as a 3rd Lieutenant and sent to Mindanao. He was promoted to First Lieutenant in 1917. He became a captain in 1922 and Major in 1935. He was appointed provincial commander of Davao in 1937 and promoted to Lieutenant Colonel. He was appointed to the General Staff in 1940 and later appointed Deputy Chief of Staff to replace Lim, who resigned the position and opted to command in the field.

=== World War II ===
When the war reached the Philippine soil in December 1941, he was given the command of the newly established unit 1st PC Brigade composed of PC units around Manila. He was posted at Laguna-Cavite after 41st Division was ordered to retreat towards Bataan.

After his unit reached Bataan, the 1st PC Brigade was dissolved and its subordinate units were absorbed by 2nd Infantry Division under Major General Guillermo Francisco, the chief of Philippine Constabulary. De Jesus was summoned by General Douglas MacArthur in Corregidor for his new assignment. He was ordered to setup and command the Military Intelligence Service of USAFFE and run and intelligence in and outside Bataan. He established his Headquarters at Little Baguio in Bataan. The unit conducted covert operations in Manila during the Japanese Occupation.

== Legacy ==
General De Jesus College in San Isidro, Nueva Ecija was named after him 1946. A street in Tondo, Manila was also named after him.

== See also ==
- Deputy Chief of Staff Armed Forces of the Philippines
