= GJC =

GJC may refer to:

- Gap junction γ, subcategory of gap junction proteins in biology
- General de Jesus College, in San Isidro, Nueva Ecija, Philippines
- Global Justice Center, an American international human rights organization
- Gujarat Janata Congress, a political party in Gujarat, India
- NFL Global Junior Championship
- Gaius Julius Caesar, Roman military and political leader
