= Roberto Lim =

Filipino aviator, airline executive and educator (1920 to 2010)

Roberto Hidalgo Lim
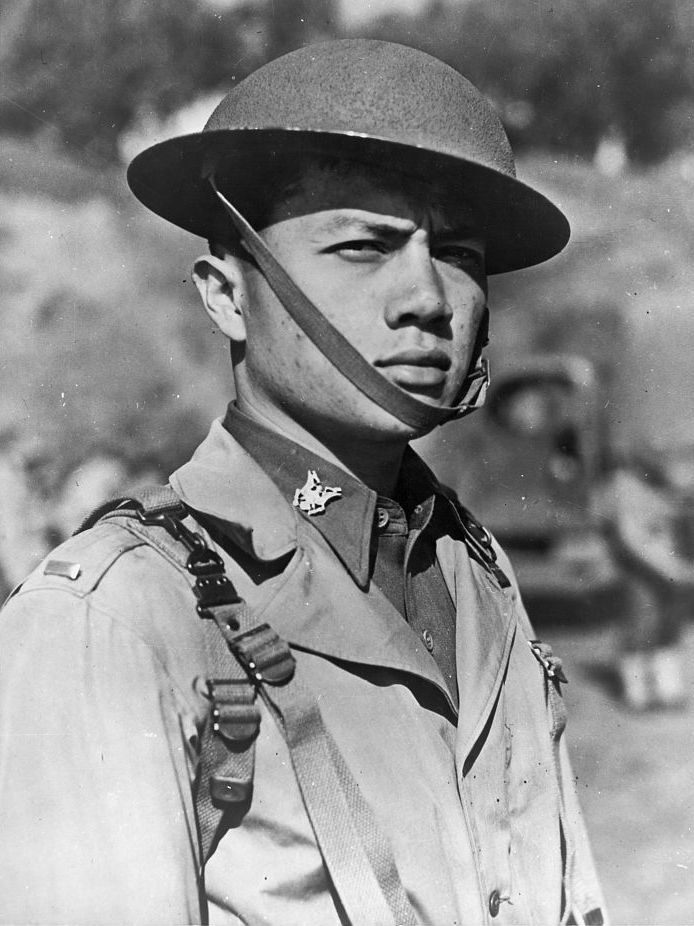
- Lt. Roberto Lim with the 1st Filipino Regiment at Camp San Luis Obispo, California
- Born: February 5, 1920; Manila, Insular Government of the Philippine Islands
- Died: April 24, 2010 (aged 90)
- Alma mater: United States Naval Academy
- Spouse: Gloria Moya Mapua (died 1987)
- Relatives: Vicente Podico Lim (father); Pilar Lardizabal Hidalgo (mother); Cheche Lazaro (niece)
- Military career
- Allegiance: Philippines; United States
- Branch: United States Army Air Force
- Service years: 1937–1946
- Rank: Captain
- Nicknames: Bob, Bobby. Fluff
- Units: 1st Filipino Infantry Regiment; 315th Bomb Wing, XXI Bomber Command
- Commands: 1st Troop Carrier Squadron, Philippine Army Air Corps
- Conflicts: World War II; Bombing of Japan

Roberto Hidalgo Lim (February 5, 1920 – April 24, 2010) was a Filipino aviator, airline executive and educator, who was the only Filipino who became a crew commander of a Boeing B-29 Superfortress during World War II.

== Early life ==
Roberto Hildalgo Lim was born on February 5, 1920, in Manila to then Lt. Vicente P. Lim and Pilar Hidalgo-Lim. His early education was at the De La Salle College in Manila, where he became good friends with another Filipino aviator hero Jesus Villamor. He took up Engineering at the University of the Philippines during his freshman year, and passed the entrance exams of the Philippine Military Academy in 1937 joining the Class of 1941. As he was the top of his class, he was appointed to the United States Naval Academy at Annapolis, Maryland, by Pres. Manuel L. Quezon. At the academy, Lim joined the Class of 1942, and was a member of the basketball team and the boat club.

== World War II ==
On December 7, 1941, the Imperial Japanese Navy's Combined Fleet conducted a surprise attack on Pearl Harbor, Hawaii, bringing the United States into World War II. The USNA Class of 1942 was graduated early on December 19, 1941, with Lim at 32nd of his class with Philippine Resident Commissioner Joaquin Miguel Elizalde in attendance commissioning him into the Philippine Army with a rank of 3rd Lieutenant.

As the Battle of Bataan was raging, with Lim's father commanding the 41st Division of the Philippine Army, the younger Lim wanted to return to the Philippines and join the fight. His request was rejected and was instead assigned to form the nucleus of 1st Filipino Infantry Regiment at Camp San Luis Obispo, California. Lim along with other Filipinos who recently graduated from the US service academies were also considered by Capt. Jesus Villamor, to join his unit in Australia, as the latter was instructed by Gen. Douglas MacArthur to be the nucleus of intelligence unit that would inserted to the Philippines in advance of the US forces' return. However, MacArthur's headquarters would later backpedal on the decision as they did not want to ask favors from the Pentagon over these Filipino officers.

By 1943, Lim was accepted to the US Army Air Corps flight school, and would later qualify for Boeing B-17 Flying Fortress and the Boeing B-29 Superfortress command.

Lim was assigned to the 315th Bomb Wing, XXI Bomber Command, in Peterson Field, Colorado Springs, Colorado. The unit would later transfer to Northwest Field, Guam in April 1944. Gen. Curtis LeMay would assign the 315th Bomb Wing the task of hitting the Japanese oil industry sites.

From June to August 1945, the 315th Bomb Wing struck oil refineries, depots, and railyards in the Japanese mainland with minimal losses. This was a duplication of the strategy implemented against Nazi Germany, which ground their military operations to a halt.

Upon Japan's surrender on September 2, 1945, on board the USS Missouri, the 315th Bomb Wing along with other bombers of the XXI Bomb Group flew over Tokyo Bay. Gen. Carl Spaatz and Gen. Henry "Hap" Arnold wanted a show of force over the Japanese capital. The 315th was also assigned to mercy missions, air dropping relief goods for POWs in camps in Japan and China.

== Post-World War 2 ==
By late August 1945 Capt. Roberto Lim returned to Manila, and reunited with his family. He joined in the search of his father who was executed by the Japanese authorities in December 1944 at the Manila Chinese Cemetery. However, Gen. Vicente Lim's body was never recovered.

Capt. Lim was assigned by Col. John P. Ryan the acting chief of the newly reconstituted Philippine Army Air Corps (PAAC) on September 1, 1945, to its first flying unit post-World War 2, the 1st Troop Carrier Squadron at the Lipa Airfield in Batangas. His mission was to help rebuild the air arm of the Philippine Army and the airfield itself, with reinstated members of the PAAC receiving initial flight training in the US and returning to the Philippines to join the 1st Troop Transport. His efforts was able to bring 11 units of Douglas C-47 Skytrains and 4 L-5 Sentinel for the PAAC, and the establishment of the PAAC flight school.

In January 1946, Capt. Lim resigned from his US Army Air Corps commission. On March 4, 1946, Lim married Gloria Mapua, the daughter of Tomas Mapua, the founder of Mapua University.

Capt. Lim would join Philippine Airlines (PAL) in 1947, initially taking on flight duty, and later managing operations. He would rise the ranks of PAL in the next 20 years, and would retire after becoming its executive vice president and one of its board of directors. Under Lim's leadership PAL would enter the jet age.

Capt. Lim would later join the Philippine Aerospace Development Corp. (PADC), as its president.

He would join the faculty of the Asian Institute of Management, and would later be appointed as its president. He would make a mark in AIM for developing the Air Transport Course.

== Personal life ==
Capt. Lim and Gloria Mapua would settle in the former mansion of Tomas Mapua along Taft Avenue Extension, Pasay, and raise 9 children. Capt. Lim was an avid yachtsman, golfer, and swimmer. Following his father's footstep, he was also a member of the National Executive Board of the Boy Scouts of the Philippines.

Tragically, Lim would lose his wife Gloria in PAL Flight 206 on June 26, 1987. Instead of suing PAL, Capt. Lim urged then President of PAL, Dante Santos, to put up the Airline Safety Foundation, which has helped air travel safer for the general public.

== See also ==
- BGen. Vicente Lim
