= Vicente Lim =

Filipino army general (1888–1944)

Brigadier General Vicente P. Lim
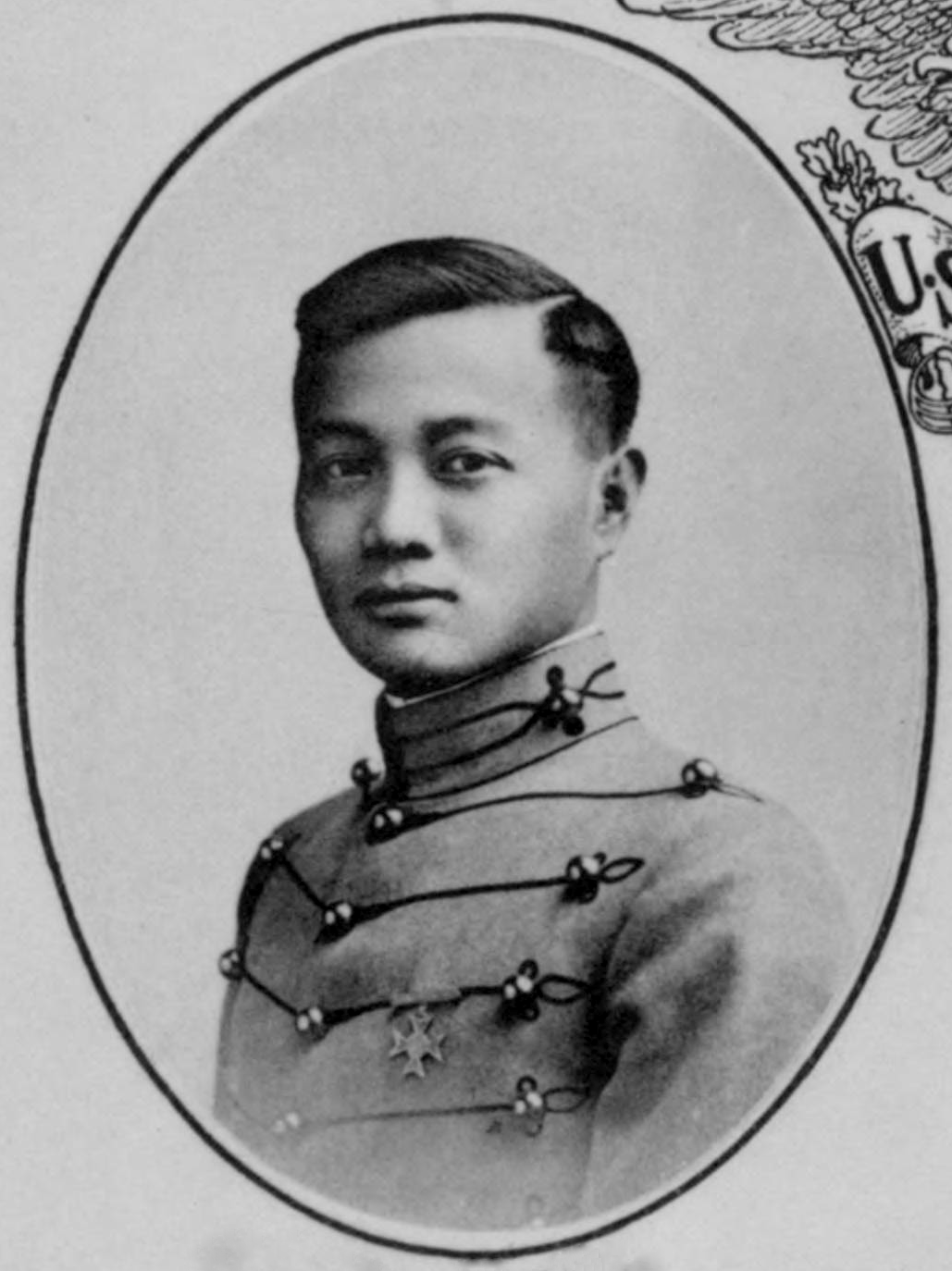
- Lim in 1914

Vice-Chief of Staff of the Armed Forces of the Philippines
- In office January 11, 1938 – May 4, 1942
- President: Manuel L. Quezon
- Preceded by: Basilio Valdes
- Succeeded by: Simeon de Jesus

Deputy Chief of Staff of the Armed Forces of the Philippines
- In office December 21, 1938 – September 1, 1941
- President: Manuel L. Quezon
- Preceded by: Basilio Valdes
- Succeeded by: Simeon de Jesus

Personal details
- Born: Vicente Lim y Podico; February 24, 1888 Calamba, La Laguna, Captaincy General of the Philippines
- Died: December 31, 1944 (aged 56) Manila Chinese Cemetery; City of Greater Manila, Philippines
- Cause of death: Execution by beheading
- Resting place: Manila Chinese Cemetery, Manila, Philippines
- Spouse: Pilar Lardizabal Hidalgo (m. 1917)
- Children: Luis (son); Roberto (son); Vicente Jr. (son); Patricio (son); Eulalia (daughter); Maria (daughter)
- Education: Philippine Normal School; United States Military Academy (Class of 1914)

Military service
- Rank: Brigadier General
- Military career
- Allegiance: (Commonwealth of the Philippines) Philippines; United States
- Branch of Service: United States Army; Philippine Army
- Service years: 1910 – 1944
- Rank: Lieutenant Colonel, US Army (retired in 1936) Brigadier General, Philippine Army (1936–1944)
- Units: 45th Infantry Regiment Philippine Scouts; 41st Division, PA (USAFFE)
- Commands: Vice Chief of Staff, Philippine Army; Chief, War Plans Division, Philippine Army; Deputy Chief of Staff, Philippine Army; Commanding General, 41st Division, Philippine Army, II Corps (USAFFE)
- Battles/Wars: World War I; World War II; Battle of Bataan
- Awards: Legion of Merit; Purple Heart; Distinguished Conduct Star; Distinguished Service Star; Distinguished Long Service Star; Posthumous honorary rank of Lieutenant General

Vicente Podico Lim (February 24, 1888 – December 31, 1944) was a Filipino Brigadier General and World War II hero. Lim was the first Filipino graduate of the United States Military Academy at West Point (Class of 1914). Prior to the establishment of the Philippine Army, he served as an officer in the Philippine Scouts (a now-defunct native Filipino unit of the US Army). During the Battle of Bataan, Lim was the Commanding General of the 41st Division, Philippine Army (USAFFE). After the fall of the Philippines he contributed to the Filipino resistance movement until his capture and subsequent execution.

Lim was one of the seven Charter Members of the Boy Scouts of the Philippines. He is memorialized in the Philippines' 1,000-peso banknote together with two other Filipino heroes who fought and died against the Japanese during the Second World War.

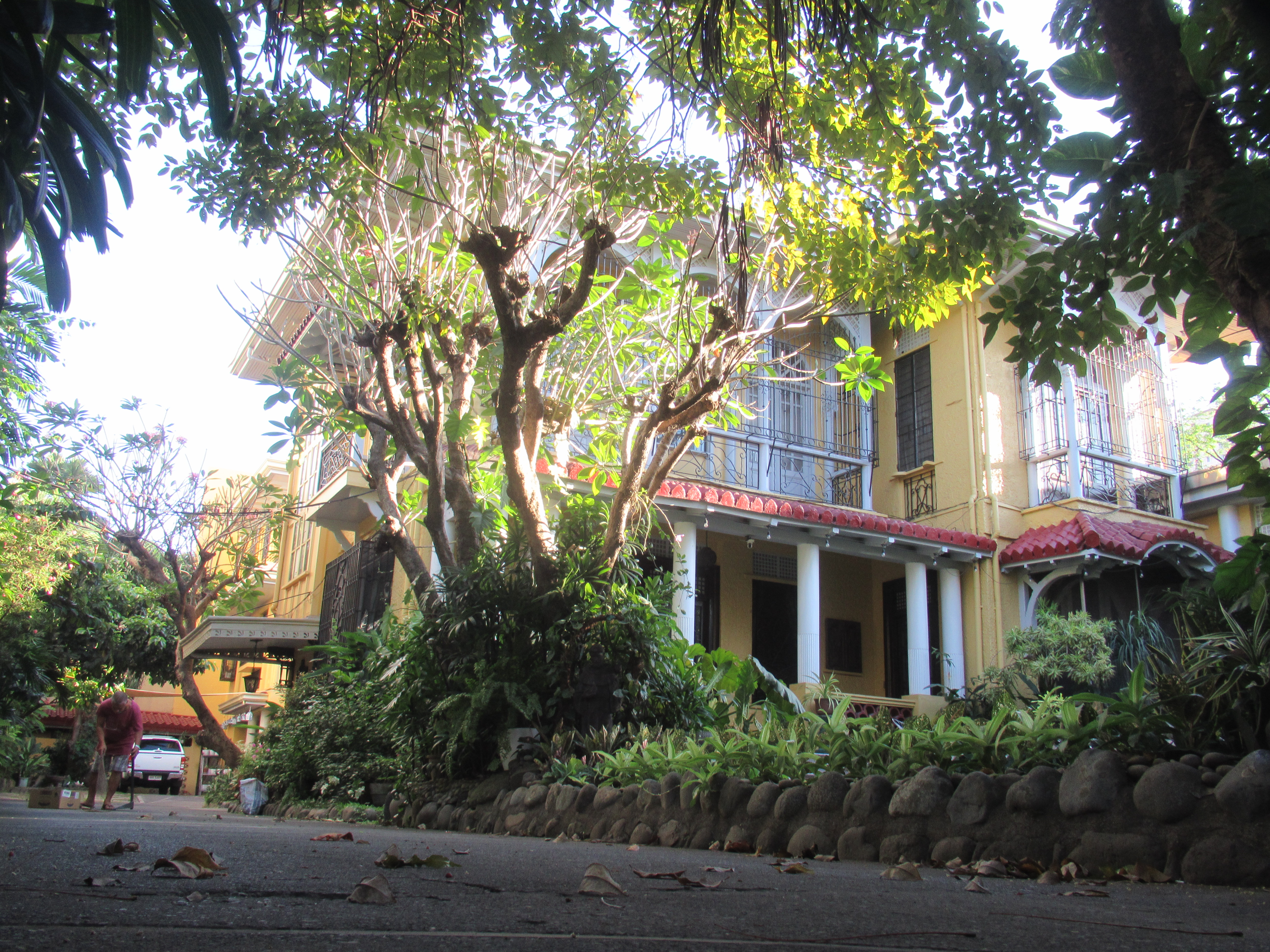
Vicente Lim and Pilar Hidalgo-Lim House in Malate, Manila

== Early life and education ==
Vicente P. Lim was born on February 24, 1888, in the town of Calamba in La Laguna (now Laguna), and was the third of Jose Ayala Lim Yaoco and Antonia Podico's four children. As a Chinese Filipino, His father was a full-blooded Sangley (Chinese migrant) who braided his hair in a queue, while his mother, Antonia Podico, was a Mestiza de Sangley (Chinese mestiza). Jose Lim died when Vicente was just nine years old, leaving Vicente's mother to raise him and his three siblings from the earnings of a small business. Vicente and the other Lim children, Joaquin, Olympia and Basilisa, like many Chinese Filipinos, grew up identifying themselves as Filipinos.

Among the friends of Jose Lim and Antonia Podico-Lim was the family of José Rizal, who was later recognized as the Philippines' national hero. The Lim Family, like the Rizal Family, leased land owned by the Dominican Order: rice lands in the Calamba barrios of Lecheria and Real and sugar land in Barrio Barandal. In 1891, recurring disputes between the Spanish administrators of the Dominican estate and the tenants over rental rates and conditions came to a head and resulted in the eviction of many tenants from their lands. Among the victims were the Lim and Rizal families.

Vicente completed grade school in Tanauan, Batangas.

=== Philippine–American War ===
It was during the Philippine–American War where the fourteen-year-old Vicente's sense of nationalism and patriotism first came to the fore. It is said that he formed a group of children his age to act as couriers for the guerrilla movement of General Miguel Malvar's forces operating in the Calamba area.

=== Philippine Normal School ===
In the period following the Philippine–American War, Vicente continued his studies at Liceo de Manila, and completed the teacher training program at the Philippine Normal School. He went on to become a teacher in a public school in Santa Cruz, Manila for a year. He decided to pursue further studies and returned to Philippine Normal. Vicente was an outstanding student, getting top marks in mathematics, as well as in other subjects. He was as good an athlete as he was a student. Impressed by his athletic skills and intelligence, a supervisory teacher encouraged Vicente to take the entrance examinations for the United States Military Academy at West Point. While Vicente only placed second in these exams issued by the Philippine Bureau of Civil Service, his 99% score in Mathematics won him the coveted scholarship. In 1910, Vicente became the first Filipino to enter West Point.

== Education at the United States Military Academy at West Point (1910–1914) ==
=== "A birth date more amenable to Academy regulations" ===
Army records reflect his birth date as April 5, 1888. By the time Lim reported to the United States Military Academy on March 1, 1910, he had already passed his 22nd birthday, which made him technically ineligible to enter the academy. While Lim took the West Point qualifying examinations in 1908, which would have made him eligible to report to the academy in March 1909, it is likely that the process of shipping required documents back and forth across the Pacific simply took too long. It thus became necessary to "indulge in the time-honored practice of adopting a birth date more amenable to Academy regulations."

=== "Cannibal" Lim ===
While Lim was the first Filipino to report to West Point, he was not the first foreign cadet to attend the academy. At that time however, foreign cadets were still an uncommon sight. When Lim arrived in the United States, he could hardly speak English. His skin was darker than that of his American classmates, who were largely ignorant about the Philippines and thought that the Philippine Islands were inhabited by savages. These factors (and perhaps the racial prejudices that were still prevalent during that period), earned Vicente the nickname "Cannibal".

=== Cadet life ===
For the first Filipino cadets who entered West Point, there was little incentive to excel academically. Filipino products of the academy were restricted to entering service with the Philippine Scouts (then exclusively organized as an infantry unit) after graduation, whereas the regular privilege for top-ranking graduates was a choice of career path (engineers, coast artillery, cavalry and infantry, in the order of usual preference). Nonetheless, Lim was eager to prove that he was just as competent as any of his classmates. "Cannibal" Lim strove to overcome his deficiencies (linguistic, or otherwise) — and did so. He soon earned the respect of his classmates as he survived his military engineering subjects, and he excelled in chemistry and mathematics. Vicente was also popular as he helped the class "goats" in their Spanish lessons, since Spanish was his second language. He also excelled in fencing and earned a spot on the academy's Broadsword Squad. For his skills on the firing range and proficiency in handling infantry weapons, he earned a badge as a Sharpshooter. The rigorous training at West Point ingrained into Vicente's very being the academy motto of "Duty, Honor and Country". This eventually became the dominating motivation in his life.

=== Fighting racial prejudice ===
Vicente P. Lim was known to his classmates as a person who was very proud of his country and his people. He refused to tolerate any form of derogatory remarks against him and against Filipinos. As a prelude to his struggle for equal treatment of Filipinos in the Army later on in his career, Lim often responded to racial provocations in a personal, or even physical way. These incidents often got him into trouble at the academy. It was something that continued right up until the days leading up to Lim's graduation from West Point. Manuel L. Quezon, then the Philippines' Resident Commissioner to the United States (he would later on become the president of the Commonwealth of the Philippines), visited West Point to attend Lim's graduation ceremonies. Upon Quezon's arrival, he was met by the underclass Filipino cadets there, whom Quezon went on to ask where Lim was. One of the cadets said that Lim was "walking the area" (a traditional form of punishment at West Point) because, "a professor said a derogatory remark concerning Asians and Lim defended us." To this, Quezon replied, "Lim is impetuous, but he certainly did the right thing."

=== The first Filipino graduate of West Point ===
After four years and having survived all the rigors of West Point, Vicente P. Lim graduated from the United States Military Academy on June 12, 1914, ranking 77th in a class of 107. Graduating was in itself an achievement, as the class of 1914 originally started out with 133 cadets. Lim was the only foreign cadet to graduate that year, in a class that originally included one cadet from Cuba and another from Ecuador.

== Early military career ==
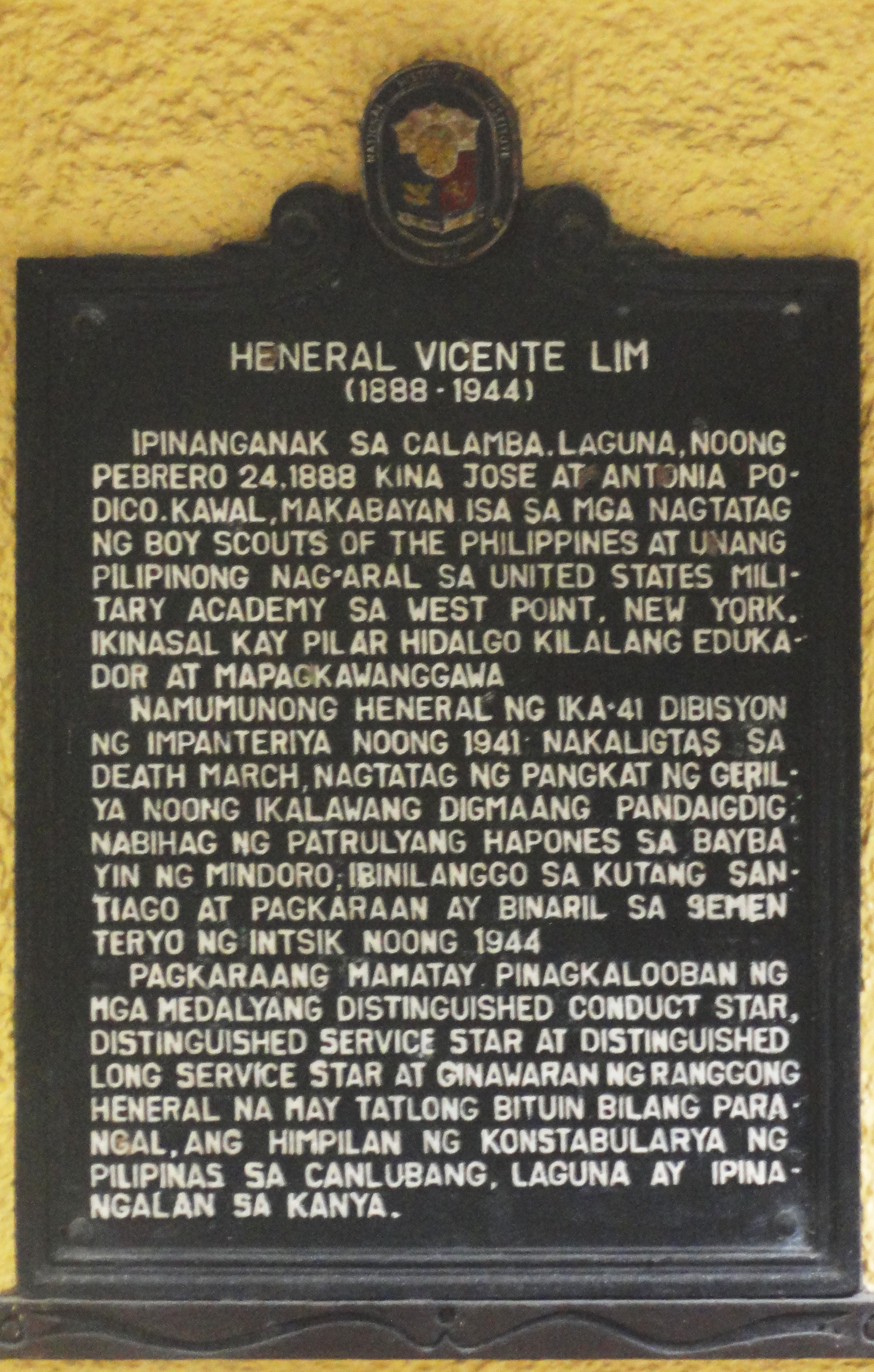
Historical marker installed in 1995 at Lim's house in Malate, Manila

=== The outbreak of World War I and Lim's initial assignments ===
Upon graduation from the United States Military Academy, Vicente Lim was commissioned as a Second Lieutenant in the Philippine Scouts. Prior to returning home to the Philippines, the young Lieutenant was sent to Europe to observe and study the set-up of the armies there. At the outbreak of the First World War, Lim was marooned in Berlin. To make his way back to the Philippines, Lim had to travel via the Trans-Siberian Railway, and had "quite an adventurous time making his way across Siberia."

Lim eventually made it back to the Philippines, and was given his first assignment with a Scout garrison in Fort San Pedro, Iloilo in Western Visayas. Lim was later assigned to the island fortress of Corregidor.

In 1916, Lim began teaching at the Academy for Officers of the Philippine Constabulary in Baguio City (the academy was later renamed the Philippine Constabulary Academy, and eventually evolved into the present-day Philippine Military Academy). Lim taught courses in Military Art, Military Law and Topography and also handled Equitation and Athletics. It was in Baguio that Vicente would meet and begin courting his future wife, Pilar Hidalgo, who was spending the summer at the Holy Family College. Pilar had gained distinction as one of the country's first female mathematicians and was the first female Cum Laude graduate of the University of the Philippines. (Pilar would also become known as a prominent civic leader, and one of the staunchest advocates of women's suffrage. Pilar later on became a co-founder of the Girl Scouts of the Philippines. She also became Centro Escolar University's third president after the death of Carmen de Luna and steered the university during the reconstruction and normalization of school operations after World War II.)

Vicente and Pilar met each other for a second time in April 1917, and their courtship continued. On the 6th of the same month, the United States ended its neutrality and declared its entry into World War I. The Militia Act (enacted March 17, 1917) called for the formation of 3 brigades for the mobilization of a Filipino division to prepare for combat in Europe. Ultimately, certain political considerations, as well as other numerous delays would push the physical mobilization of these Filipino units to October 1918. The First World War ended a month later, without any of these troops being shipped out. However, the uncertainty brought about by the situation then, forced Lim to press for a quick engagement and an early wedding. A military wedding was held in Quiapo Church on August 12, 1917. Soon after the wedding, Lim and his bride departed for Jolo and later on, Zamboanga, where Lim was assigned.

=== First clash with General Douglas MacArthur and other controversies ===
Just as he did during his days at West Point, Lim never hesitated to make his displeasure known towards unfair treatment and discrimination against Filipino officers on the basis of race. As early as 1914, Lim complained to Manuel L. Quezon about the "insults and petty harassment he had suffered because of his color". In 1922, as a captain stationed with the 45th Infantry Regiment, Philippine Scouts at Fort McKinley (now Fort Bonifacio), Lim refused an order to transfer to Corregidor "when it became apparent that the reason for the order was to free living quarters at the Fort for incoming American officers." The Commanding General of the Scout Brigade at McKinley, General Douglas MacArthur, relented, and allowed Lim to remain at his post. It would not be the last time that Lim would clash with the army brass on similar issues.

Lim advocated for the equal treatment of Filipino officers within the United States Army, specifically regarding compensation, promotion, and professional respect. An anecdote often cited to illustrate his stance involves an incident where a lower-ranking American serviceman refused to salute him. In response, then-Major Lim reportedly ordered the soldier to face a hat stand holding his officer's cap and salute it repeatedly until ordered to stop.

While Lim was mostly vocal on issues related to discrimination in the Army, he was equally vocal on the importance of maintaining a certain standard among its officer corps. He did not shy away from giving critiques of his fellow officers in the Philippine Scouts (Americans included) who were "unfit" to serve. In 1927, Lim wrote Major John Sullivan, assistant to General Frank McIntyre, the Bureau of Insular Affairs Chief: "I have many friends in the Scouts, but I can frankly state that as a whole they are the greatest handicap for the government ... The great majority of them are even disgusted with their own selves."

Lim was a staunch believer that the strength of any military organization was a function of the quality of its corps of officers. It was a cause he would continue to champion later on in his career, during the formation of the fledgling Philippine Army.

=== Further military education ===
The passage of the National Defense Act of 1920 finally allowed Filipino officers to be assigned to various military schools in the United States for further military education. In 1926, Vicente Lim was assigned to the United States Army Infantry School at Fort Benning, Georgia. It was at Benning that Lim became classmates with Akira Nara, who would later on command the Japanese 65th Brigade, one of the Japanese Army's invading units during the Battle of Bataan (Lieutenant General Nara became notorious for having ordered the slaughter of over 350 men of the 91st Division, Philippine Army (USAFFE) ). Upon completion of his training at Benning, Lim was sent for further studies to the United States Army Command and General Staff College (USACGSC) at Fort Leavenworth in Kansas.

In 1928, Lim continued his extended stay in the United States, and he was subsequently assigned to the Army War College in Washington, D.C. As part of the coursework, then-Major Lim wrote a thesis in April 1929 entitled, "The Philippine Islands - A Military Asset". The paper was praised by the Commandant of the War College, Major General William D. Connor, as a "study of exceptional merit made at The Army War College". General Connor would go on to forward the document to the War Plans Division, War Department General Staff for reference, "being of interest to that Division". As it would turn out, the paper would accurately predict the conduct of the campaign Japan would eventually launch against Filipino and American forces in the Philippines in 1941–1942.

These advanced courses enhanced Lim's knowledge of military science and further honed his keen military mind. At the outbreak of World War II, this same education and training would prove invaluable, as Lim was the only Filipino at that time to have attended the USACGSC and the Army War College. This made him the only Filipino General technically qualified to command a division.

=== Colegio de San Juan de Letran ===
Lim returned to the Philippines in 1929 and was appointed the professor of military science and tactics (PMS&T) at Colegio de San Juan de Letran and raised the standards of the training program there.

=== Retirement from the US Army ===
After more than 350 years of foreign rule and almost 40 years after the first declaration of Philippine independence at Kawit, Cavite, the Philippines took the penultimate step towards self-rule. On November 15, 1935, the Commonwealth of the Philippines was established. The first act of the Commonwealth Government, the National Defense Act or Commonwealth Act. No. 1 (enacted on December 21, 1935), laid out the country's National Defense Policy and established the Army of the Philippines, a force completely separate from that of the United States'.

Lim's West Point education and his completion of command and general staff programs in the United States, made him a natural nominee to aid in the establishment of a national defense system for the Philippines. However, Lim was faced with a dilemma: either to stay on with the US Army as a lieutenant colonel and complete the required tenure for a full pension, or to join the fledgling Philippine Army, sacrifice his tenure and get less pay. Lim ultimately decided to do the latter; he retired from the United States Army June 30, 1936. He joined the Philippine Army and was immediately given the rank of brigadier general.

== Boy Scouts ==
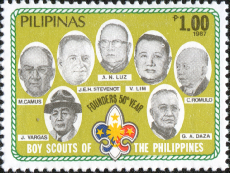
Lim (third from the right) founders of the Boy Scouts of the Philippines. Stamp for National Boy Scout Movement 50th Anniversary, October 28, 1987

On October 31, 1936, Lim along with Col. Josephus Stevenot, Senator Manuel Camus, General Carlos Romulo, Executive Secretary Jorge Vargas, Don Gabriel Daza, and Arsenio Luiz, officially chartered the BSP in Commonwealth Act No. 111 authorized by President Manuel Quezon.

The Boy Scouts of the Philippines celebrate Lim's U.S. army records April 5 birthday as "Vicente Lim Day (1888)".

== Formation of the Philippine Army ==
Lim was appointed chief of the War Plans Division of the Central General Staff of the Philippine Army.

He was first assigned to the War Plans Division; quoting from his own letter, "Some of you who are on the inside of the War Department might have read my strategic reconnaissance of every corner of this country. I found that we have the manpower to defend our vital areas, and God has given us the advantage of our natural terrain features to effectively give a nice showing against any first class power. But because of our lack of finance we are struggling hard economically to solve this problem."

On April 4, 1939, Lim became Deputy Chief of Staff of the Army of the Philippines.

Like he did on issues of discrimination against Filipino soldiers in the US Army, Vicente clashed with MacArthur and other top brass on the strategy being employed in building up the country's National defense. He believed that it was being built up too rapidly with no solid foundation to stand on. Most of the officers and recruits were half-baked and poorly trained. This was in addition to the fact that at the very core of the Army's organization, there was rampant corruption. As a more convenient and cheaper way to build up the Philippine Army, the National Defense Act of 1935 re-designated the Brigadier General Vicente Lim Philippine Constabulary (then the country's national police force) to become nucleus of the new Army. This, in Vicente's view, was a fundamental mistake. Vicente believed that the Army should be built from the ground up, so that it may develop its own unique traditions, ideology and esprit de corps. This was also to ensure that none of the 'rotten eggs' and flawed systems from the PC would be perpetuated in the new Army. On many occasions, Vicente threatened to resign from the Army, on account of his disgust with the institution, and the fact that he was "surrounded by crooks," with "... no power nor influence to eliminate them".

== World War II and the Battle of Bataan ==
=== The formation and mobilization of the 41st Infantry Division, Philippine Army ===
==== Integration into the USAFFE ====
Up until December 1941, the United States had carefully maintained its neutrality, even as Japanese forces continued to wage war in China and as Adolf Hitler's U-Boats menaced merchant shipping in the Atlantic Ocean. While America avoided being in a state of open conflict with any state, it did support the war efforts of the United Kingdom, Soviet Union, and China against the Axis powers by sending weapons, supplies and materials under the Lend-Lease program. However, heightened tensions across the globe, deteriorating negotiations with Japan and the failure of all diplomatic efforts to halt Japanese aggression in the Far East, made it clear that it would only be a matter of time before the United States' involvement would entail more than just sending material aid to its allies. Japanese occupation of naval and air bases in Formosa and southern Indochina in July 1941, and the increasingly precarious situation and location of the Philippines (being in between Japan and the resource-rich Dutch East Indies), only added to the certainty that US interests in the Philippine Islands and the rest of the Pacific were directly under threat.

As early as 1906, American pre-war military planning – the reality of having to fight a two-front war – "Europe First" strategy, wherein it was deemed that (the need to defeat Nazi Germany first, while fighting a holding action against Japan in the Pacific), there was increased optimism among American military leaders regarding the feasibility of defending the Philippines against a Japanese invasion. Materials were also sent to the Philippines in an effort to protect American interests in the Islands and in the Far East.

On July 27, 1941, the USAFFE (United States Army Forces in the Far East) was created, leading to the integration of the Philippine Army into the USAFFE. During this transition, Lim stepped down as Deputy Chief of Staff to assume command of the 41st Infantry Division.

By September 1, 1941, the mobilization of the Philippine Army was in full swing, marking a significant step in its preparations.

In August 1941, as the threat of war loomed closer, President Manuel Quezon issued an order to place the Philippine Army and Philippine Constabulary under the command of the United States Army Forces in the Far East (USAFFE). Even with the problems that plagued the Philippine Army, Vicente realized that the more imminent threat was the fact that there was not much time to mobilize a strong defense force for the country. Vicente knew that if the Japanese invaded, he could serve his country better by relinquishing his position as Deputy Chief of Staff (the second highest position in the Army) and assume a field command. He was eventually put in command of the 41st Infantry Division (PA). Recruits came from his home province of Laguna, as well as Rizal, Cavite, Quezon, and Marinduque. Almost all the men were awfully green and untested in combat.

The main cantonment area of the 41st Division was set up along the Tagaytay ridge (today, the 41st Division, PA, USAFFE Shrine in Tagaytay marks the general location of the division's camp).

==== Organization of the chain of command ====
Consistent with his long-held belief that the strength of any military unit lies with the men that lead it, General Lim put a lot of thought into how the officers of the 41st Division were organized. He made it a point to get to know his men—their strengths, weaknesses, tendencies and personalities—and organized them, "according to the best principles of command" and in a way he thought would work best in forging the 41st Division into an effective fighting unit. General Lim picked who he thought were the Army's best commanders. In cases where he felt that a commander was deficient in some of the requisite abilities or qualities, Lim assigned the best Executive Officers under them. For officers he knew to be effective in the field and were hard-working, but were somehow lacking in tact, he assigned subordinates whom he knew to be more effective communicators, to provide balance. General Lim also ensured that he picked the most competent Quartermasters for the Division, something that would prove invaluable during the battle that was forthcoming.

=== The outbreak of war and the withdrawal to Bataan ===
The little training (or in many cases, no training at all) that the men of the nascent Philippine Army received between September 1941 and December 1941, would turn out to be all they would take to battle against the menace that was to befall the Philippine Islands. As late as December 1, 1941, only about two-thirds of the 41st Division had been called into active service. Only a few days later, on December 7, 1941 (December 8, 1941 in Asian time zones), Japan launched an attack on Pearl Harbor. Within a matter of hours of each other, Japanese forces also commenced attacks on the Philippines, Guam, Wake Island, Thailand, and the British-ruled territories of Hong Kong and Malaya.

==== Setting up defenses along the Batangas coastline ====
General Douglas MacArthur's initial strategy for defending the Philippines was to stop the Japanese at the beaches at all costs (in contrast to the original War Plan Orange 3, which called for an immediate withdrawal to the Bataan Peninsula). He divided his command into the North Luzon Force, the South Luzon Force and the Visayan-Mindanao Force.

Brigadier General Vicente Lim's 41st Infantry Division was one of two divisions (along with the 51st Infantry Division, Philippine Army) assigned to the much smaller South Luzon Force under Brigadier General George M. Parker Jr. The South Luzon Force was assigned to defend the beaches south and east of Manila. Its mission was to protect the airfields in its sector and prevent hostile landings. The 41st Division's area of responsibility was the coastline of Nasugbu, Batangas. There, General Lim's division dug in. Well-designed and organized defenses were set up by the division. However, the men eventually had to abandon the sector, as all units were ultimately ordered to begin withdrawal to Bataan.

At the very least, some of the nervous troops of the 41st were assured that their weapons worked, as turtles occasionally triggered improvised warning devices in the dark, causing troops along the line to fire at what they thought to be infiltrating Japanese.

==== The withdrawal to Bataan ====
Despite the ten-hour window between the time news was received about the attack on Pearl Harbor and the first Japanese attacks on the Philippines, American and Filipino forces were still generally caught by surprise. Within hours, many airfields and naval stations were destroyed by Japanese air attacks. Many valuable American aircraft had been caught on the ground, and the bulk of those that survived the initial Japanese raids were sent south to Mindanao, en route to Australia. The US and Philippine Army units meant to contain hostile Japanese landings at the beaches were eventually overwhelmed by the initial Japanese onslaught.

It soon became apparent that a withdrawal to Bataan (as called for in War Plan Orange 3) was the best remaining option for Filipino and American forces, and from there, deny the use of Manila Bay by the Japanese. On December 24, 1941, USAFFE headquarters notified all unit commanders that "WPO-3 is in effect". With this, the withdrawal to the Bataan Peninsula began.

Like all other units, General Lim's 41st Division was given the order to move out of their positions along the Batangas coast and move out to Bataan that Christmas Eve. Almost all the USAFFE units which made a withdrawal from the beaches had to make a fighting retreat. General Lim's division however, in the course of its withdrawal from the Batangas coast to Bataan (through Manila), was fortunate not to have come in contact with any hostile forces. Thus, the Division entered Bataan intact.

===== Acquisition of supplies =====
With the hurried withdrawal of the USAFFE to Bataan, the defenders had to deal with the unfortunate reality that much of their vital supplies simply could not be brought into the peninsula in time. Thus, historical accounts that discuss the Battle of Bataan invariably touch on the meager rations that all the Filipino and American defenders relied on during the course of the gallant stand.

Fortunately for the men of the 41st Division, their situation was slightly more favorable, at least during the initial phase of the battle. A paper written by Col. Juanito R. Rimando in 1978 described Brigadier General Vicente Lim as a commander who was "very particular about the Division's status on supplies and food". Ensuring that his men were well provided for started with choosing (in General Lim's own words) "the best Quartermaster" available. The Division Quartermaster chosen by General Lim before the war began was Juan O. Chioco, assisted by an equally able Executive Officer, Ernesto D. Rufino.

Taking a cue from their Commanding General, both Chioco and Rufino secured supplies on their own initiative, even if it meant not being totally dependent on the Division's "normal sources of supply". On December 28, 1941, there were rumors that the USAFFE had opened its depot in Angeles City and Army units were free to get all the supplies that they needed and could carry. Promptly, Chioco ordered Rufino to take 22 trucks to gather much-needed supplies. Rufino returned with the trucks the next day, hauling large quantities of food, clothing, supplies and other equipment. The supplies were stored at the Balanga Sugar Central. A few days after, an American inspector from higher headquarters arrived at the 41st Division's quartermaster headquarters and was surprised with the large quantity of supplies the Division had. Apparently appalled by what he discovered, the inspector "accused Captain Chioco of hoarding while other units lacked these. He threatened to file court-martial charges against Chioco". The American officer took the matter to General Lim. The officer expected General Lim to side with him, but instead the General "bawled him out like hell and said ... that he's got no business interfering with the affairs of the Division, much more so on ... the way the supplies under question were procured." Rimando writes, "The American inspector left a more subdued individual".

The relatively better supply situation of the 41st Division is corroborated in memoirs written by other 41st Division veterans such as Captain Jose M. Zuño. On December 29, 1941, Zuño wrote, "BGen Vicente Lim, 41st Div Commanding Gen distributed bacon and Lucky Strikes cigarettes as Christmas presents, to the officers and men of the division." There can be little doubt that all these played an essential role in making the 41st Infantry Division one of the most effective fighting units during the Battle of Bataan.

=== The defense at Abucay ===
"Lim is the hero of Bataan", states the Philippine Army Bulletin of April 1947, "General Lim's 41st Division made possible the Battle of Abucay, which I believe is the most decisive battle of Bataan. , . At Abucay the Japs for the first time met real opposition... Contact at Abucay was about 8 January 1942. The Japs, employing massed artillery followed closely by aggressive infantry action hit the 41st Division. For the next 18 days the Japanese tried to break the 41st Division line and failed. Abucay was abandoned on 25 January when Jap breakthroughs in Moron and Natib made Abucay untenable... After Abucay the Japs started to withdraw from Bataan, and resumed their attack in April, thus allowing MacArthur forty precious days for the preparation of Australia as an operational base. If any one factor can be said to have contributed mostly to make Bataan possible, that can be Abucay. And If any one unit can be said to have made Abucay possible that is General Lim's 41st Division.

Absolute knowledge that they were to hold at all cost gave those members of the Regiment, who were fighting for their homeland, an additional incentive. The Filipino soldier did not have to be motivated to fight. They were the only Philippine Army unit to have been awarded the Presidential Unit Citation for helping the 57th Infantry Regiment of the Philippine Scouts.

696 casualties from the intense fighting along the Abucay front for the 41st Infantry Regiment out of 1821.

"Probably due to the very heavy casualties that they had suffered in the actions along the Mt. Natib-Abucay line, the Japanese were slow to follow up the advantage gained by the Corps withdrawal." "Considering the lack of training in almost all of the Philippine Army units, their combat efficiency was much higher than expected." 500 casualties being hospitalized due to malaria daily, by March, the figure had risen to almost 1,000.

Abucay, not yielding an inch of ground, saving Bataan from early defeat

It was in Bataan that the Japanese met the stiffest resistance from the armed forces during the campaign. For over 3 months, the 41st Division fought gallantly under grueling hostile fire, determined not to give up any ground. It was assigned to defend the biggest portion of the main battle position, yet it repelled the heavy armored and infantry attacks of the Japanese. The previously untested troops of the 41st repeatedly denied any ground to the superior enemy forces and inflicted heavy casualties on every Japanese offensive. Because of the repeated beatings they received from the 41st, the Japanese actually began avoiding the sector that the 41st defended. For this, General Lim, and the rest of the men of the 41st Infantry Division earned respect and commendation from their co-defenders. In a letter sent to General Lim during the siege, Carlos P. Romulo wrote: "Everyone here is praising your courage and your ability. You are THE one Filipino General who has caught the imagination of everyone. The General (MacArthur), speaks highly of you all the time ... The General has spoken to the President (Quezon) about your courage and he has praised you time and again. The President once told me: "I have always said that fellow Lim is the only General we have in our army with cojones, and he is showing it now." Romulo later on wrote, "General Lim is the embodiment of the Philippine Army in Bataan: ragged, starved, sick unto death, beaten back hour after hour --- but invincible!"

=== The Orion-Bagac Line ===
Having been forced out of their positions along the Mauban-Abucay line, the Filipino and American defenders of Bataan made a hasty withdrawal to its second (and last) defense line on Bataan, the Orion-Bagac line. Compared to the Mauban-Abucay position, the Orion-Bagac line was a shorter, continuous line that spanned the middle of the Bataan Peninsula. Here, General's Lim's 41st Division was assigned to defend the center of the line, in front of Mt. Samat extending to the Pantingan River to the west.

==== The Battle for Trail 2 ====
By January 26, 1942, all USAFFE units had made good their withdrawal to the Orion-Bagac line. The Japanese forces on the other hand, were eager to force a quick conclusion to the battle and pressed on with little respite. Unfortunately for the USAFFE troops, there was still much confusion as to the final disposition of some units along the front. During the withdrawal from the Mauban-Abucay line, a number of changes were made by the USAFFE Command to initial plans and assignments, and this information did not get to some individual unit commanders in time. As a result, there were many critical gaps along the line that were left undefended. One such gap was the position astride Trail 2 and near the barrio of Capot (since renamed to Barangay General Vicente Lim), an important north–south trail that offered the Japanese the easiest route of advance (with the exception of Bataan's East Road) south to Limay, one of the objectives of the Japanese attack.

General Clifford Bluemel, the sector commander for the area around Trail 2 and one of those who was not properly informed of the shifts of units along the front line discovered the gap not too long before the Japanese put their next attack in motion. To remedy the dangerous situation, a mix of various units, led by the 41st Infantry Regiment (already recipients of a Presidential Unit Citation for its actions in Abucay) of General Lim's 41st Division were sent to plug the gaps. By the night of January 27, the 41st Infantry, after a 24-hour march to the sector, joined units from the 31st and 51st Divisions just in time to aid against the Japanese attack on the area which was already underway. By the 29th, more Japanese troops made their way across the Pilar River, and towards a bamboo thicket just 75 yards in front of the USAFFE's main line of resistance.

The resulting battle was a brisk and bloody one fought at close quarters. General Lim's men, as they did along the Abucay Line, held firm against every Japanese onslaught. Company K of the 41st Infantry met the enemy at bayonet point. The next morning, more than a hundred dead Japanese were found within 150 yards of the main line of resistance. Some of the bodies, were found only a few yards away from the Filipinos' foxholes who suffered only light casualties. The Japanese effort to penetrate the USAFFE line had failed.

Despite their heavy losses, the Japanese resumed their attacks on the night of January 31. While their attack was preceded by aerial and artillery bombardments, the Japanese were again frustrated when effective machine gun fire halted their planned infantry advance.

On February 2, the 31st Engineer Battalion, Philippine Army was sent to decisively clear the bamboo thicket of the remaining Japanese troops. Shortly after their attack had begun, the Engineers met stiff resistance and their attack stalled. Once again, the men of the 41st were called on, and sent to aid in the attack. The advance of the Filipinos then continued, and by dusk, they had finally reached the thicket. The next morning, they resumed their attack only to find that they had cleared the area of all remaining Japanese, effectively ending the threat to Trail 2.

The fight for Trail 2 remains one of the finest moments in Philippine Army history.

==== Lull in the fighting and the proposal to counterattack ====
By February 1942, the Japanese had already overshot their original estimate of being able to secure the Philippines within 50 days. The commander of Japanese forces, General Homma, ordered the suspension of offensive operations, in order to regroup and reorganize. As a result, there was a lull in the fighting on Bataan until the middle part of March 1942.

General Vicente Lim understood that unless a Japanese soldier was either dead or totally disabled, he was not going to stop attacking. Thus, during the lull, he made a proposal to the high command for a counterattack by USAFFE forces towards San Fernando, Pampanga. General Lim hoped that a counterattack north, would not only regain ground and their previous defensive positions, but would also give the USAFFE a chance to acquire much needed food stocks. He also believed it would provide a much-needed morale boost to the Filipino and American troops. Unfortunately, no counterattack materialized. It will never be known how much success such a counterattack would have actually yielded (and how much it would have really changed the long term course of events), but the admissions of Japanese Generals Homma and Takaji Wachi after the war suggest that there was indeed a great chance of success. So "demoralized and badly mangled" were the invading Japanese, that of its 16th Division and 65th Brigade, only two battalions could be classified 'effective' at the time

==== "To inspire and to lead" ====
The effectiveness of the 41st Division as a fighting unit was as much due to the capability of its leadership, as it was about the bravery and tenacity of its fighting men. Brigadier General Vicente Lim's competence and his ability to get the most out of his men, contributed to making the 41st Division one of the most decorated units in the Battle of Bataan. An excerpt from the memorial article written by his classmates at West Point, best describes the way General Lim led men in battle: "General Lim knew his military science. General Lim had an uncanny faculty of predicting events. General Lim was an excellent judge of men. Although he had gained the reputation in peace time of being rough and outspoken, in war he was father to his men. He was accessible, and gave his counsel when this was sought. He made his subordinates fight by making them feel that upon their personal efforts depended the outcome of the battle." An article written by Life Magazine reporter Melville Jacoby on March 16, 1942, in turn, offers a testimony to how General Lim's soldiers responded to his leadership: "One Filipino general is a West Pointer – the first from the Philippines to graduate – swarthy, barking General Vicente Lim, whose soldiers say if they don't jump at his command he'll kick them in the tail. Lim was most pleased the other day when he needed 50 volunteers from his men for a patrol mission and 200 stepped forward."

While much praise was showered on General Vicente Lim for his leadership and the performance of his Division, it was his earnest desire to make sure credit was given where it was due. In his last known letter from Bataan, General Lim wrote to his wife: "With all this talk I sincerely give the credit to my officers and enlisted men. They are the ones who did it all. Mine is only to inspire and to lead them. When history is written I will give them all the credit. Their satisfaction is mine to share."

=== The fall of Bataan ===
After almost four months of fighting the Japanese, the elements, hunger and disease, and with their fates already sealed by the decision made by Allied leaders to defeat Hitler's Germany first, the beleaguered defenders of Bataan were simply in no condition and position to effectively resist the enemy's final push to defeat them. The final Japanese offensive for Bataan began on Good Friday, April 3, 1942. The main attack was directed at the center of the main line of resistance, the sector covered by General Lim's 41st Division. The attack was preceded by an intense and sustained aerial and artillery bombardment. The intensity of the bombardment and the use of incendiaries effectively depleted the Division's ability to hold the line. By April 7, 1942, General Lim had assessed that the fight was over. One of Lim's last official acts was to issue a commendation to his division, "Your courageous and tenacious defense of your line for the last five days against tremendous odds and continuous bombing and shelling by the enemy merits my highest praise and commendation. I am proud to lead such a group of men." On April 9, 1942, all Filipino and American forces on Bataan were ordered to surrender. Bataan had fallen.

=== The Bataan Death March and incarceration at Camp O'Donnell ===
After the surrender of Bataan, the Japanese Command anticipated that they would take around 25,000 prisoners of war (POWs), only to find that they did not have the logistics to transport the more than 65,000 Filipinos and 12,000 Americans who surrendered. The Japanese had also assumed that the surrendering soldiers would have their own rations, not realizing that the defenders that had given them such stiff resistance for more than three months, had just been surviving on half rations or less. The results were no less than disastrous. Filipino and American prisoners, who were already exhausted, sick and starving, were forced to go on a 65-mile (105 km) forced march from Mariveles, Bataan to San Fernando, Pampanga. Thousands died along the way. But starvation and exhaustion were not the only killers in this "march of death". Prisoners were subjected to untold brutalities by their Japanese captors, who had all been trained in the Samurai's medieval warrior code — Bushido—and were taught that being taken prisoner was far worse than death. All prisoners, therefore, were looked upon as subhuman and unworthy of respect. Stragglers were beaten, shot or bayoneted. Those who attempted to escape or stop to get water met the same fate. Many that were too sick to continue on the march were buried alive. Even the courageous Filipino civilians that were caught offering food or drink to the passing columns, were beaten or killed as well.

Those that survived the march to San Fernando were then herded like cattle and jammed into boxcars, where thousands more died of suffocation because they had all been packed in too tight. Many accounts describe how the dead were kept standing because there simply was not any room for them to fall. The trains then took the POWs to Capas, Tarlac, from where they had to march the last 8 miles to Camp O'Donnell. This whole tragedy would later become known as the infamous "Bataan Death March". Some estimates state that as many as 20,000 men died during the march. General Lim was among those who survived.

Unbeknownst to the survivors of the 9-day Death March, their suffering was far from over. A former Philippine Army camp, Camp O'Donnell was a facility designed to accommodate only 10,000 men. Cramming five times that number into the camp resulted in the deaths of thousands more. Poor sanitation, the lack of medical facilities, the shortage of food and water, and the continued brutality of the Japanese guards all contributed to the death toll.

=== Underground resistance and guerrilla operations ===
As if the ordeal of the Bataan Death March and the horrific conditions at Camp O'Donnell were not enough, many surviving American POWs were sent off on "hell ships" to do forced hard labor in Japan, Manchuria, Korea and Taiwan, among others, until the end of the war. Those that were too weak, were incarcerated in various POW camps across the Philippines. Filipino POWs that survived O'Donnell were more fortunate, as they were eventually paroled and released by the Japanese. All were made to sign waivers that they would not join any resistance movements. Nonetheless, many did continue to fight the Japanese and joined the underground and various guerrilla organizations.

Upon his release, General Lim went to live in Manila with his brother-in-law's family, the Clemente Hidalgos. By this time, the Japanese had installed a puppet government headed by President José P. Laurel. Lim was sent feelers to head the puppet Philippine Constabulary. Absolutely determined not to have anything to do with the Japanese-controlled government, he had himself confined at the Institute of Cancer building of the Philippine General Hospital. With the cooperation of his doctors, Lim was pronounced "sick", giving him a ready excuse to turn down the appointments offered to him. He supposedly told an enraged Filipino ranking official that he preferred death at the hands of the Japanese, rather than an assassin's bullet.

Lim used his time at the PGH to get back to health. Friends sent him food and other forms of help, and thus was comparatively well provided for. Lim sustained himself at the hospital by using proceeds from the sale of shares he owned in the Mangco Dry Dock. He continued to fight the Japanese using these same funds, personally financing various guerrilla activities in the provinces. Directing all of these operations from the PGH, Lim had his operatives give regular weekly reports about Japanese troop movements, disposition, and military installations. Such information, like those provided by many other brave Filipino guerrillas, greatly contributed to the success of American and Filipino military operations to liberate the Philippines in the latter part of 1944 to 1945.

General Lim's involvement in the underground and guerrilla operations inevitably made him a target of the Japanese Military Police.

== Capture and death ==
In June 1944, General Lim was ordered to make his way to Australia to join General MacArthur in planning the re-capture of the Philippines. He also received information that he could be picked up by Kempeitai at any time. The decision was made to try to escape from the Philippines. While on route to Negros Island to meet a submarine that was to take him to Australia, the boat General Lim was riding with his companions, was flagged down off the coast of Batangas. The Japanese searched the hold and arrested Lim and his companions when two guns were found in the boat's hold. They were made prisoners and first taken to Calapan, Mindoro for initial investigations before being sent back to Manila.

Lim and his companions were imprisoned in Fort Santiago for the duration of the investigation and interrogation. There, Lim was reportedly tortured. The filthy conditions in which prisoners were kept, caused General Lim to contract a skin disease. Despite this, stories from fellow prisoners tell of how General Lim kept the spirits of the other prisoners up, and encouraged them to not lose hope.

Eventually, the results of the investigation at Fort Santiago laid a death sentence on Lim. He was transferred to the Kempeitai headquarters at the Far Eastern University and subsequently to the old Bilibid Prison. Nothing was heard of him after his transfer to Bilibid. Records pronounced General Lim "missing" in 1944.

It was a full 50 years later, in 1994, that the Lim family was able to make contact with Richard Sakakida, who had actually witnessed General Lim's death. Sakakida, a Nisei, was a United States Army intelligence agent stationed in the Philippines at the outbreak of World War II. He told the family that General Lim, together with some 50 or so guerrillas, were taken to the Chinese Cemetery where a long trench had been dug. They were all made to kneel and subsequently beheaded. Their bodies were then thrown into the trench and covered.

General Lim's body was never found.

== Honors, tributes, memorials and legacy ==
=== Legacy ===
Brigadier General Vicente Lim's distinguished service in the military spanned a period of almost 35 years and 2 World Wars. He was a pioneer throughout his career, being the first Filipino to graduate from West Point (and from various general staff schools), a charter member of the Boy Scouts of the Philippines, and a key figure in the formation of a young nation's armed forces. He continued to "inspire and to lead" throughout the gallant stand at Bataan, and the guerrilla resistance. Today, he is remembered as the consummate professional soldier, who never compromised his principles, and stayed true to "Duty, Honor and Country" to the very end.

=== Medals for gallantry and outstanding military service ===
For all his years of serving with distinction in the military and for "exceptionally meritorious conduct in the performance of outstanding services and achievements" Lim was posthumously awarded the Legion of Merit by the United States Army. Lim was also posthumously awarded the Purple Heart by the United States (awarded for "being wounded or killed in any action against an enemy of the United States or as a result of an act of any such enemy or opposing armed forces").

In recognition of General Lim's bravery and gallantry during the Battle of Bataan, the Philippine government awarded him the Distinguished Conduct Star and the Distinguished Service Star, the Philippines' second, and third highest military awards. He was also given a posthumous honorary rank of Lieutenant General.

=== Monuments and memorials ===
In recognition of his services to the Filipino people, General Lim likeness appears on the Philippine 1,000-peso banknote together with José Abad Santos and Josefa Llanes Escoda. Lim also appears on postage stamps (₱3.20 value) which were first issued on August 22, 1982. In September 1951, the former Camp Paciano Rizal in Calamba, Laguna was renamed Camp General Vicente P. Lim in honor of the revered commanding general of the 41st Infantry Division. The location of the Camp was the site where the 41st Field Artillery Regiment of the 41st Division was mobilized prior to the outbreak of World War II in the Philippines. The Camp once served as the site of the Philippine National Police Academy and the headquarters of the PNP's INP Training Command. Today, Camp Brig. Gen. Vicente P. Lim serves as the Headquarters of Police Regional Office 4A (PRO 4A) CALABARZON, whose area of responsibility covers the five provinces of Region IV A: Cavite, Laguna, Batangas, Rizal, and Quezon.

Across the Cultural Center of the Philippines, on Roxas Boulevard is a statue of Lim, along with a marker with the inscription: "We are born to live a life which is valuable only if we live it unselfishly, not for our own gratification, nor for that of our family - but for our country. Men should not fear death, but dishonor and defeat. There is nothing more beautiful than to live and die for the defense of one's country against a common enemy. There is nothing meaner and more vile than to yield to that enemy without fighting to the last ditch." – Vicente Lim, March 20, 1941. It is a quote from a speech the General gave to a group of UP ROTC graduates during their commencement exercises.

A bust of Brigadier General Vicente P. Lim, is one of six busts featuring various Philippine national heroes in the town square of Hinigaran, Negros Occidental.

The Headquarters building at the Philippine Military Academy is named Lim Hall in the General's honor.

Various schools across the Philippines (such as the General Vicente Lim Elementary School in Tondo, Manila) are named after Lim.

The former Barangay Kaput/Capot in Orion, Bataan is now named Barangay General Lim. Part of one of the more important battles during the Battle of Bataan, the Battle of Trail 2, took place here.

Many streets across the Philippines are named after General Vicente Lim.

=== Traditions and annual ceremonies in honor of General Vicente Lim ===
==== February 24 (General Lim's birthday) ====
Various ceremonies mark the birth anniversary of General Vicente Lim. Ceremonies are held in Camp Brig. Gen. Vicente P. Lim (hosted by the PNP-PRO4), in front of General Lim's statue along Roxas Boulevard (hosted by the City of Manila), as well as the ancestral lot where General Lim was raised in Calamba (hosted and organized by the Masonic Lodge of Calamba – Dr. Jose P. Rizal Lodge No. 270).

==== Rank insignia distribution - Philippine Military Academy ====
A general is easily distinguished from officers of lower rank because of the stars attached to the general's helmet or shoulder boards. The rank insignia of a Lieutenant in the US Army on the other hand, is a bar. General Lim once told his wife Pilar, that receiving his lieutenant's bar upon graduating from West Point was more meaningful and memorable to him than it was receiving his first star as a general. This simple confession became the basis of a rich tradition that has lasted for more than 50 years.

Upon leaving the institution, graduates of the Philippine Military Academy (PMA) are commissioned as Second Lieutenants or Ensigns in the Armed Forces of the Philippines. Their rank insignia is a triangle, a symbol associated with the Philippine Revolution against Spanish rule in the 1800s. Since 1957, it has been the tradition of the direct descendants of General Vicente Lim to distribute these first rank insignia to the graduating class of the academy. The tradition was initiated by Vicente's wife, Pilar Hidalgo Lim, not only to honor the memory of her late husband, but also, to help impart upon the future leaders of the Armed Forces, the principles which defined his life.

== Other personal details ==
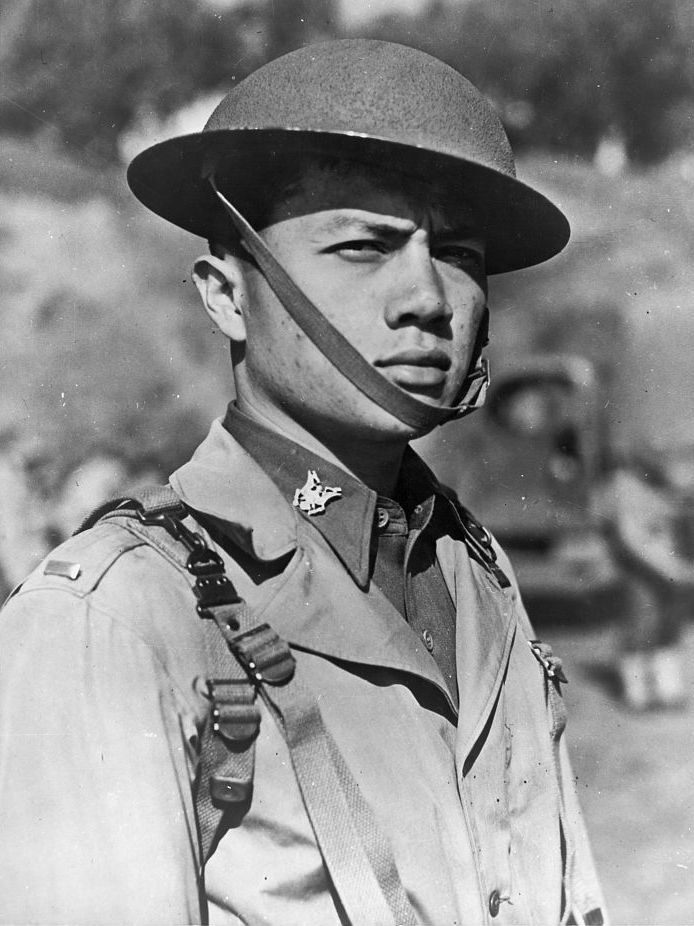
General Lim's son, 2nd Lt. Roberto H. Lim on March 1, 1942

General Lim was described by his West Point classmates as "rough and cheerful" and "had a sense of humor". They also described him as someone who "had a kind heart under this rough exterior, and was very considerate of others in the smallest details. He fully absorbed the spirit of West Point, and was always proud that he was a graduate." Furthermore, while Lim had a "reputation ... of being rough and outspoken", he "had human weakness". In Bataan, upon learning that his wife would be broadcasting a message on the radio, General Lim "ran to our radio tent and tears welled from his eyes as he heard his wife's voice and a message from his daughter."

One of Lim's close associates, Colonel Isagani V. Campo, wrote, "(General Lim's) most cherished thoughts were centered in the welfare of the war veterans and their widows. He had planned for the establishment of memorial homes or hospitals for the veterans and their widows and had pledged to devote the remaining years of his life to this cause."

A "born gambler", Lim was a very good bridge player and loved playing mahjong as well.

His letters reveal that Lim played the stock market and entered into various oil and mining ventures to help augment his income.

Brig. Gen. Vicente P. Lim was known to be a Mason.

His son, Vicente H. Lim, Jr. (1923–2012), later graduated from West Point in June 1944 (around the time of his father's capture).

== Notable quotes ==
=== About his fellow soldiers ===
With all this talk I sincerely give the credit to my officers and enlisted men. They are the ones who did it all. Mine is only to inspire and to lead them. When history is written I will give them all the credit. Their satisfaction is mine to share.

— Brig. Gen. Vicente P. Lim, in a letter to his wife from the front line in Bataan, February 20, 1942

=== On service and fighting for one's country ===
to me, the satisfaction of the service, well done, is more than anything that any amount of money can give. This you might call is the satisfaction you get for your services towards your own people and country ... But most important of all is to leave a name that my posterity may be proud of.

— Brigadier General Vicente Lim, in a letter to one of his sons, 1938

I am of the firm conviction that the success of national defense will not depend much on the armaments nor the training of our able-bodied men but will depend 90% on the will of the people to fight for the country.

— Brigadier General Vicente Lim, in a letter to his sons, 1940

There are many forms of service that you can render to your country ... what I want to impress on you is that if death is necessary to accomplish your end in upholding your dignity and that of your country then death should be nothing.

— Brigadier General Vicente Lim, in a letter to his sons, 1941

We are born to live a life which is valuable only if we live it unselfishly, not for our own gratification, nor for that of our family - but for our country. Men should not fear death, but dishonor and defeat. There is nothing more beautiful than to live and die for the defense of one's country against a common enemy. There is nothing meaner and more vile than to yield to that enemy without fighting to the last ditch.

— Brigadier General Vicente Lim, in a commencement address to the ROTC graduates of the University of the Philippines, March 1941

=== On dignity, conviction and principles ===
You will go further, even if you may not acquire wealth, but you will be happier and well contented if you go via the straight path in life -- that is honesty and integrity.

— Brig. Gen. Vicente P. Lim, in a letter to one of his sons, 1939

No great man will ever succeed in life if they do not grind their teeth and take the most dangerous path for the attainment of an end.

— Brig. Gen. Vicente P. Lim, in a letter to one of his sons, Roberto, 1939

If you make a mistake, take it on the chin. Those things will happen many times in your life. Swallow it. Have that strength of character to make the best out of it.

— Brig. Gen. Vicente P. Lim, in a letter to his sons, 1939

no matter what you do, be careful of what you say and if you happen to say it, do it.

— Brig. Gen. Vicente P. Lim, in a letter to his sons, 1940

Dignity is of prime importance in successful living ... Give your life if dignity can be protected or restored. That should be the philosophy of all Filipinos.

— Brig. Gen. Vicente P. Lim, in a letter to his sons, 1941

=== On preparation ===
Necessity is the mother of invention. Danger is the father of preparation.

— Brig. Gen. Vicente P. Lim, in a letter to his sons, 1941

I wish you will bear in mind that no matter how small a thing you want to do, plan it ahead of time, think it over and allot a certain time for you to prepare your plans, for a mediocre plan is better than a brilliant unprepared plan that is haphazardly carried out.

— Brig. Gen. Vicente P. Lim, in a letter to his sons, 1941

=== On patriotism, democracy and nation building ===
The principal defect of our national defense is not the training nor the lack of finances, but the great and dangerous defect of democracy which has been implanted into the minds of the Filipino people. We have a nationally wrong conception of democracy. Our democracy in the Philippines is unilateral. It is only for the benefit, for the freedom, for the rights, comfort and happiness of each individual member of the nation. That is the common belief, and I venture to say that 99.9% of our people believe in that kind of democracy. They do not know their obligations, their duties and the sacrifices that they should give to the state which is the relative counterpart of the amount of personal democracy he should indulge. The two should balance.

— Brig. Gen. Vicente P. Lim, in a letter to his sons, 1940

If we desire the respect of other nations, we must show them that we are exerting all efforts to build a nation not only strong in arms but unconquerable in spirit. An indomitable will to fight & an unflinching resolution to defend at all costs "life, liberty & the pursuit of happiness" are the fundamental characteristics of any nation that deserves to survive

— Brig. Gen. Vicente P. Lim, in a commencement address to the ROTC graduates of the University of the Philippines, March 1941

A civilian doing his work in the pursuit of national defense is just as much a soldier as a man in uniform, if not better; because patriotism is a moral quality which should be possessed by all.

— Brig. Gen. Vicente P. Lim, in a commencement address to the ROTC graduates of the University of the Philippines, March 1941

=== Others ===
You must, however, not lose your sense of humor, which is also a great item in your success. Sense of humor is the counterweight for your misfortunes which you will meet from time to time, from the smallest to the biggest ... If you take anything seriously without any sense of humor and you should happen to fail, it will be the beginning of your downfall.

— Brig. Gen. Vicente P. Lim, in a letter to his sons, 1939

My greatest misgiving in this Army is the old system of the Filipino people. For an honest man it is rather the cause of my unhappiness. I am unhappy every time I see an officer or a reserve given more advantage over his brother officer because of his political or personal pull. That irritates me so much, I just cannot get over it.

— Brig. Gen. Vicente P. Lim, in a letter to his sons, 1940

== In film ==
Vicente P. Lim is depicted, by Maximiano Romualdez Janairo, Jr. (USMA class of 1954), in the 1955 John Ford movie, The Long Gray Line. In that scene, he is portrayed graduating with the United States Military Academy Class of 1915 (instead of 1914), "the class the stars fell on", perhaps in the context of listing the notable cadets of the period who went on to have outstanding military careers and were made famous by their meritorious service and wartime exploits.
