= Josefa Llanes Escoda =

Filipino social worker and suffragist (1898–1945)

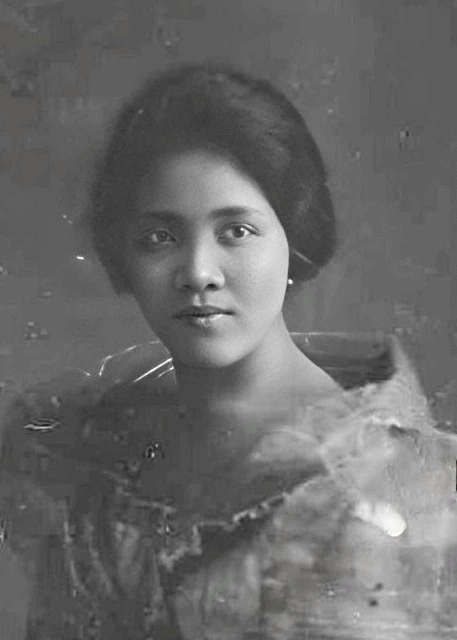
- Escoda's U.S. passport application picture, 1922
- Born: Josefa Llanes y Madamba; September 20, 1898; Dingras, Ilocos Norte, Captaincy General of the Philippines
- Died: January 6, 1945 (aged 46); Sampaloc, Manila, Philippine Commonwealth
- Resting place: Unmarked grave in either La Loma Cemetery or Manila Chinese Cemetery, Manila, Philippines
- Known for: Founder of the Girl Scouts of the Philippines; Filipino World War II hero
- Spouse(s): Antonio Escoda, Sr. (m. 1927)

Josefa Madamba Llanes Escoda (born Josefa Llanes y Madamba; 20 September 1898 – 6 January 1945) was a Filipino teacher and social worker known for her role in the establishment of the Girl Scouts of the Philippines and campaigns for women's suffrage.

After receiving a high school teacher's certificate from the University of the Philippines in 1922, she became a social worker for the American Red Cross in the Philippines and received a scholarship to study in the United States. She received her master's degree in 1925 and continued her social work in the Philippines the following year. She held various teaching positions in universities and social work positions related to healthcare.

She became the president of the National Federation of Women's Clubs from 1941 to 1944. During the Second World War, she led the provision of relief to POWs. However, she was arrested on 27 August 1944 and was imprisoned in Fort Santiago. She was last seen alive on 6 January 1945.

Together with José Abad Santos and Vicente Lim, she is depicted on the Philippine one thousand-peso banknote as Filipinos who died resisting the Japanese occupation of the Philippines. She is recognized as the "Florence Nightingale" of the Philippines for her social work, campaigns for women's suffrage, and role in forming the Girl Scouts of the Philippines.

== Early life ==
Escoda was born in Dingras, Ilocos Norte as Josefa Llanes y Madamba. She was the eldest of the seven children of Mercedes Madamba and Gabriel Llanes. Josefa's siblings were Florencio, Luisa, Elvira, Rosario, Purita, and Eufrocina. Josefa's nickname was Pepa as a child.

Josefa graduated as valedictorian in grade school from Dingras Elementary School and as salutatorian from her provincial high school in Laoag, Ilocos Norte. She went to Philippine Normal School in Manila to earn her teaching degree and graduated with honors in 1918. While working as a teacher, she earned a high school teacher's certificate from the University of the Philippines in 1922.

Her father, Gabriel Llanes, died in 1918 due to an influenza epidemic in the Philippines.

== Career ==
After obtaining her teacher's certificate, she became a social worker for the Philippine Chapter of the American Red Cross. The Red Cross granted her a scholarship as a pensionada to the United States in 1922 through a recommendation from Josefa Jara Martinez. She studied at the New York School of Social Work and earned a master's degree in social work from Columbia University in 1925. Josefa was one of the incorporators of the National Federation of Women's Clubs (NFWC) in 1921 and was assistant treasurer of the organization until 1922. She held a position in the NFWC as executive secretary in 1932, and as president from 1941 until her death in 1945. Josefa Escoda succeeded Pilar Hidalgo-Lim as the president of the NFWC in 1941 and was succeeded by Trinidad Legarda.

Josefa's scholarship only included her tuition fees. Hence, she relied on various jobs, which included office work and baby-sitting, and financial assistance from her mother. Josefa joined a group of foreign students who supported the founding of the International House in New York. She was assigned as an adviser to students and received free board and lodging. During her free time in the International House, she accepted speaking engagements around the United States to lecture about the Philippines to American audiences with compensation. It was also her practice to wear a Filipiniana dress during her lecture tours to promote foreigners' interest in the Philippines.

In 1925, Josefa was invited by Carrie Chapman Catt to represent the Philippines in the Women's International League for Peace in Washington, D.C. Catt provided assistance for Josefa since Josefa informed Catt that she could not pay the necessary expenses to travel. During the event, she met Antonio Escoda, a Philippine Press Bureau reporter from Gandara, Samar, whom she later married on 11 June 1927 in the Philippines. They had two children: Maria Teresa, who later became the president of the Cultural Center of the Philippines from 1986 to 1994, and Antonio Jr., who became a member of the Associated Press Southeast Asia writing staff.

After her stay in the United States from 1922 to 1925, Escoda returned to the Philippines in 1926. She became a lecturer in sociology at the University of the Philippines from 1927 to 1930 and at the University of Santo Tomas from 1930 to 1932. She was appointed as the field secretary of the Philippine Chapter of the American Red Cross from 1926 to 1929, where she managed civilian relief activities in rural communities and assisted in finding jobs for the unemployed.

She was the executive secretary of the Philippine Anti-Leprosy Society from 1928 to 1932, social organizing secretary of the Tuberculosis Commission of the Bureau of Heath from 1932 to 1935, then as an editor of the Bureau of Health's Health Messenger from 1935 to 1941.

== Suffrage Activity ==
The NFWC began suffrage campaigns and mobilized women's organizations across the Philippines in 1921. In 1933, Filipino women were granted the right to vote through Act 4112, which was an amendment of the Hare–Hawes–Cutting Act. However, this right was effectively revoked with the rejection of the Hare–Hawes–Cutting Act and the adoption of the Tydings–McDuffie Act in the 1935 Constitution. The Constitution stated that women would be allowed the right of suffrage if a plebiscite held within two years after the ratification of the Constitution results in the affirmative vote of at least 300,000 women.

The NFWC conducted social work across the Philippines to convince Filipino women to vote for the affirmative. Their activities included providing food and medical relief, setting up literacy booths for Filipino men and women, and informational lectures on maternal education. Volunteer adults also joined teaching in literacy booths. Executive secretary Josefa decided to prioritize social work as she believed that only discussing suffrage to Filipino women would be impractical.

The special plebiscite was held on 30 April 1937. On the eve of the plebiscite at 29 April, Josefa Llanes Escoda, along with Judge Natividad Almeda-López, Josefa Jara Martinez, Pilar Hidalgo-Lim, Concepción Felix, Geronima Pecson, and Corazon Torres, spoke on the radio channel KZRM in different languages to appeal to listeners to support the suffrage plebiscite, where Josefa spoke in Ilocano. The plebiscite resulted in the majority vote supporting the affirmative of granting suffrage to women.

== Girl Scouts of the Philippines ==
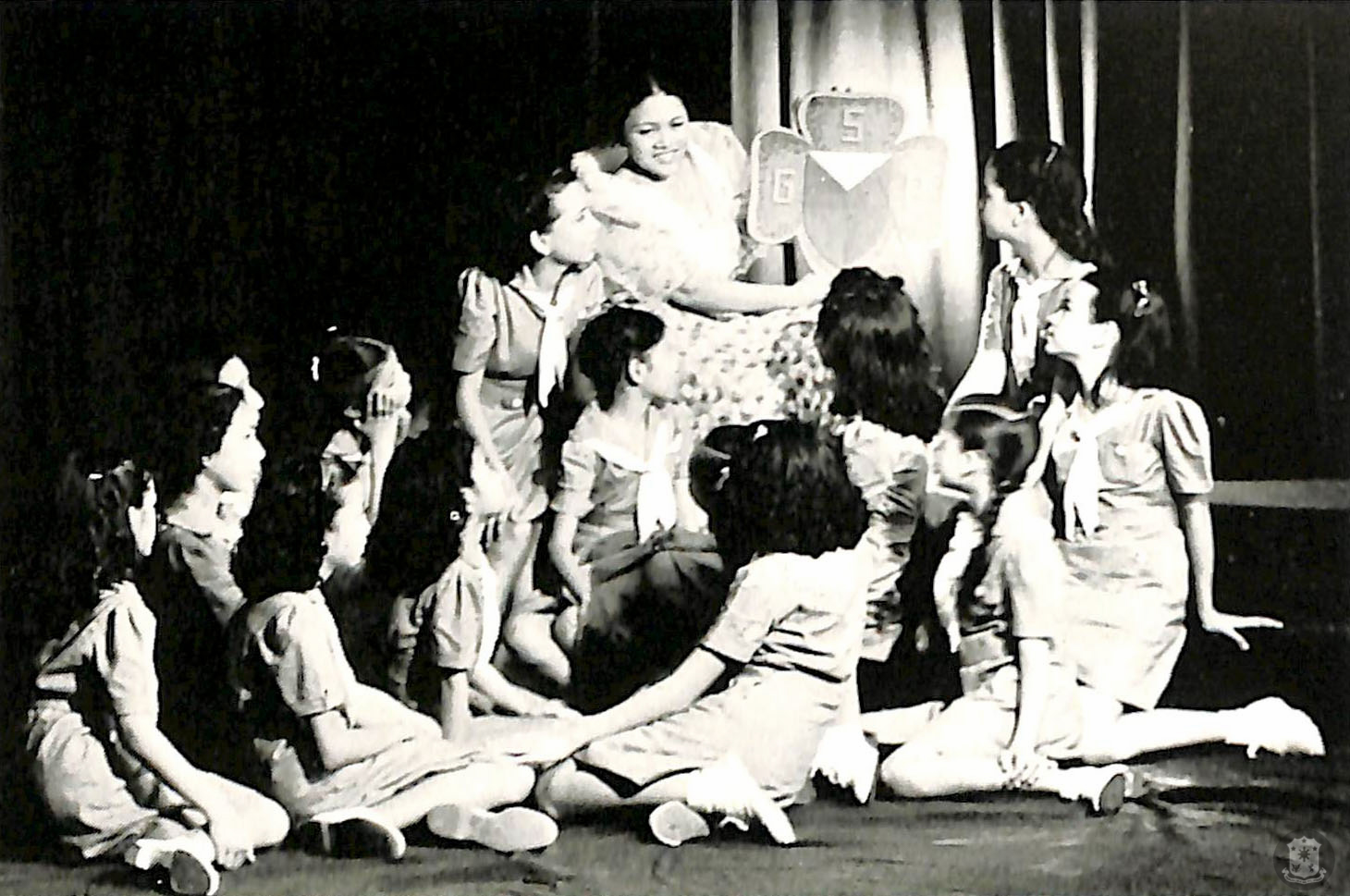
Escoda talking to young girls about the Girl Scouts of the Philippines in 1941

With the formation of the Boy Scouts of the Philippines in 1936, an initiative was formed to organize a girl scout's organization in the Philippines. Escoda traveled with sponsorship from the Boy Scouts of the Philippines to the United States in 1939 to undergo extensive training in girl scouting in preparation for formally organizing a girl scout's organization in the Philippines. In her trip, she observed boy and girl scouting work in various cities in the US. She also visited the World Bureau of Girl Scouts and Girl Guides in 1940 in London for her training.

Escoda returned to the Philippines again in 1940. Afterward, she began to train young women to become girl scout leaders, then organized the Girl Scouts of the Philippines. On 26 May 1940, President Manuel L. Quezon signed the charter of the Girl Scouts of the Philippines. Helena Z. Benitez was the chairman of the Girl Scouts of the Philippines Central Committee, while Josefa became the group's first national executive. At the time of the charter, there were 1,000 Girl Scouts in the Philippines.

== World War II ==
During World War II, Japanese forces invaded the Philippines. Josefa Llanes Escoda, as the president of the National Federation of Women's Clubs, continued her social work but also supported underground wartime activities against the Japanese. The two-story NFWC headquarters building in Malate, Manila, was used as a dormitory for stranded students and teachers, and a restaurant was set up to raise funds for community kitchens in Manila and provisions for prisoners of war. The Girl Scouts of the Philippines, which had around 3,000 girl scouts in December 1941, went underground and supported wartime activities by providing funds for social work and relief to prisoners of war in the Bataan Death March. There were around 3,000 girl scouts in December 1941 when the Japanese invaded the Philippines. Members of the NFWC and the Girl Scouts transmitted messages of families to war prisoners and provided clothing, food, and medicine The Japanese allowed the NFWC to operate community relief and support operations without interference during the occupation period. Josefa, her sibling Elvira Llanes, and Antonio also assisted American POWs and civilian internees at the University of Santo Tomas, Cabanatuan, Bongabon, and Los Baños.

Lt. José L. Llanes, intelligence officer and commander of Ilocos Norte and Ilocos Sur, said he saw Josefa Escoda on 14 January 1944 in the presence of her husband, Antonio Escoda. Josefa left this final message to Lt. José L. Llanes:

"I have done my duty to my country and God! To my mind the most I have done is having helped with the little I could do to save the lives of the surrendered soldiers of Bataan and Corregidor. I have offered myself as a guarantor for men later released by the enemy, that they commit no anti-Japanese act, men who, if they had the guts left would continue their resistance. I have acted as guarantors not only for the sake of humanity, but also to encourage them to fight again. If you happen to survive, and I fail, tell our people that the women of the Philippines did their part also in making the ember sparks of truth and liberty alive till the last moment."

However, by 1944, news of the underground activities of Escoda and her husband Antonio had spread and Japanese authorities began to be suspicious on their activities. The couple intensified their activities of supplying medicine, food, clothes, and messages to both Filipino war prisoners and American internees in concentration camps. Antonio Escoda was arrested on 10 June 1944 with General Vicente Lim and other Philippine Army officers, who were captured in Mindoro. Minerva Laudico, executive secretary of the NFWC and a friend of Josefa, attempted to convince Josefa after learning of Antonio's arrest to evacuate from Manila and hide in Nagcarlan, Laguna, Laudico's hometown. Josefa decided to stay in Manila.

Josefa Escoda was also arrested two months later on 27 August. She was imprisoned in Fort Santiago, the same prison as her husband, who was executed in 1944 along with General Vicente Lim, who was imprisoned with him. On 6 January 1945, Josefa Llanes Escoda was then taken and held in one of the buildings of Far Eastern University occupied by the Japanese. She was last seen alive on 6 January 1945, severely beaten and weak, and was transferred into a Japanese transport truck. It is presumed that she was executed and buried in an unmarked grave, either in the La Loma Cemetery or Manila Chinese Cemetery, which Japanese forces used as execution and burial grounds for thousands of Filipinos who resisted the Japanese occupation.

== Legacy ==
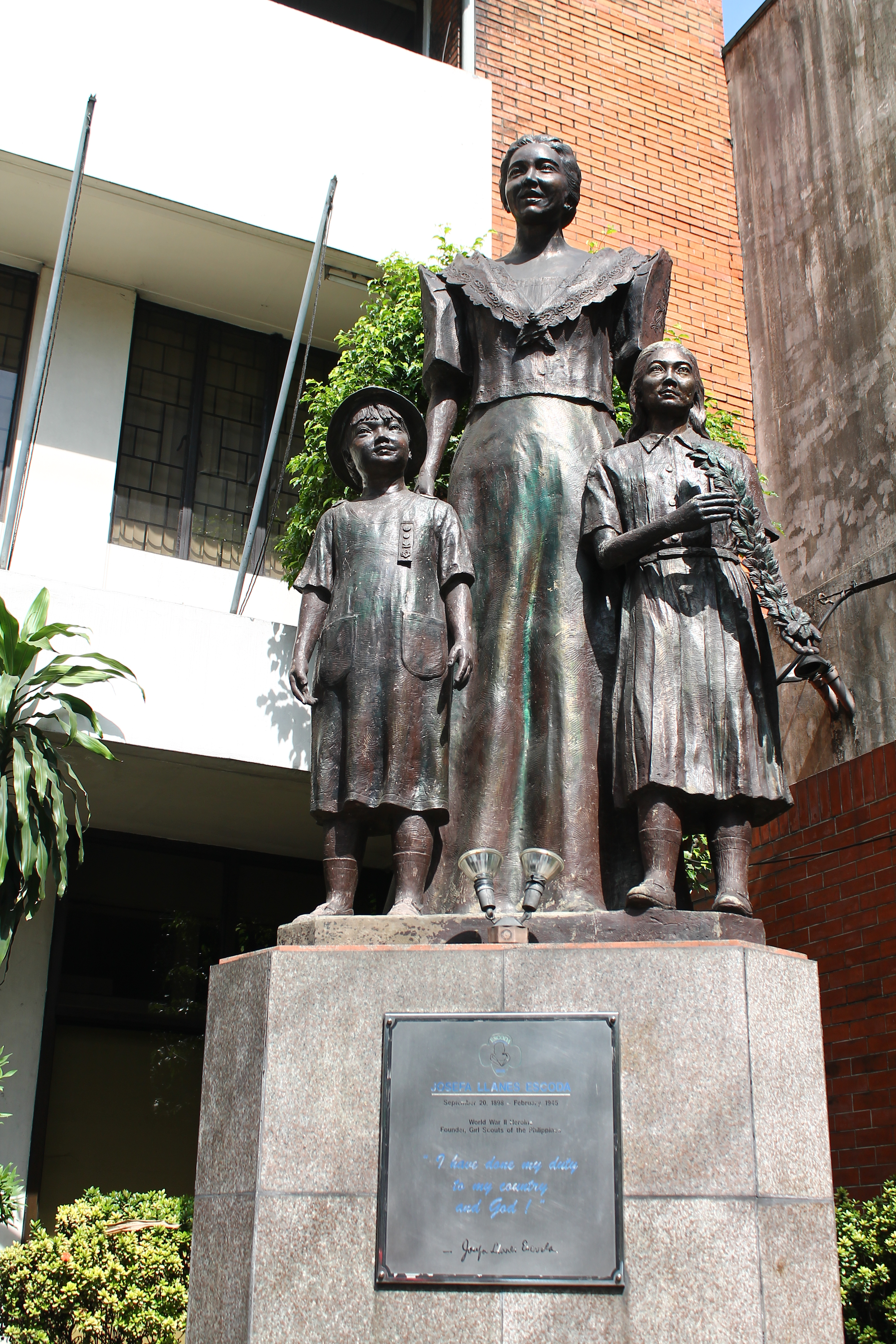
Josefa Llanes Escoda Monument in Ermita, Manila

A street in Manila has been named after Josefa Llanes Escoda, and monuments have been dedicated to her memory in Ermita, Manila, and her birthplace in Dingras. In 2007, a portion of the Apayao-Ilocos Norte Road was also renamed in her honor. She is memorialized on the non-polymer version of the Philippine 1,000-peso banknote that is still in circulation up to this day, as one of three Filipinos martyred by the Japanese Armed Forces.

Various Proclamations were issued to declare 20 September, the birthday of Escoda, as Josefa Llanes Escoda Day. The first was in 1959 under the presidency of Carlos P. Garcia, then in 1986 under Corazon C. Aquino. On 29 May 1998, President Fidel Ramos declared 1998 as the Josefa Llanes Centennial Year and 20 September 1998 as a Special Day in Ilocos Norte. President Bongbong Marcos declared 20 September 2024 a non-working day in Dingras as tribute to Escoda.

The Girl Scouts of the Philippines pay homage to Josefa Llanes Escoda every 20 September by celebrating her birth anniversary with activities that commemorate her contributions to youth development and her martyrdom.

On 20 September 2018, a Google Doodle was created to commemorate her 120th birthday.

A maritime feature in the Spratly Islands, Sabina Shoal, is officially named as Escoda Shoal in the Philippines, as part of the municipality of Kalayaan, Palawan.

== In popular culture ==
- Portrayed by Timmy Cruz in 1997 TV series of ABS-CBN's Bayani, in episodes "Josefa Llanes Escoda".
