= Asociación Feminista Filipina =

Filipino women's organization

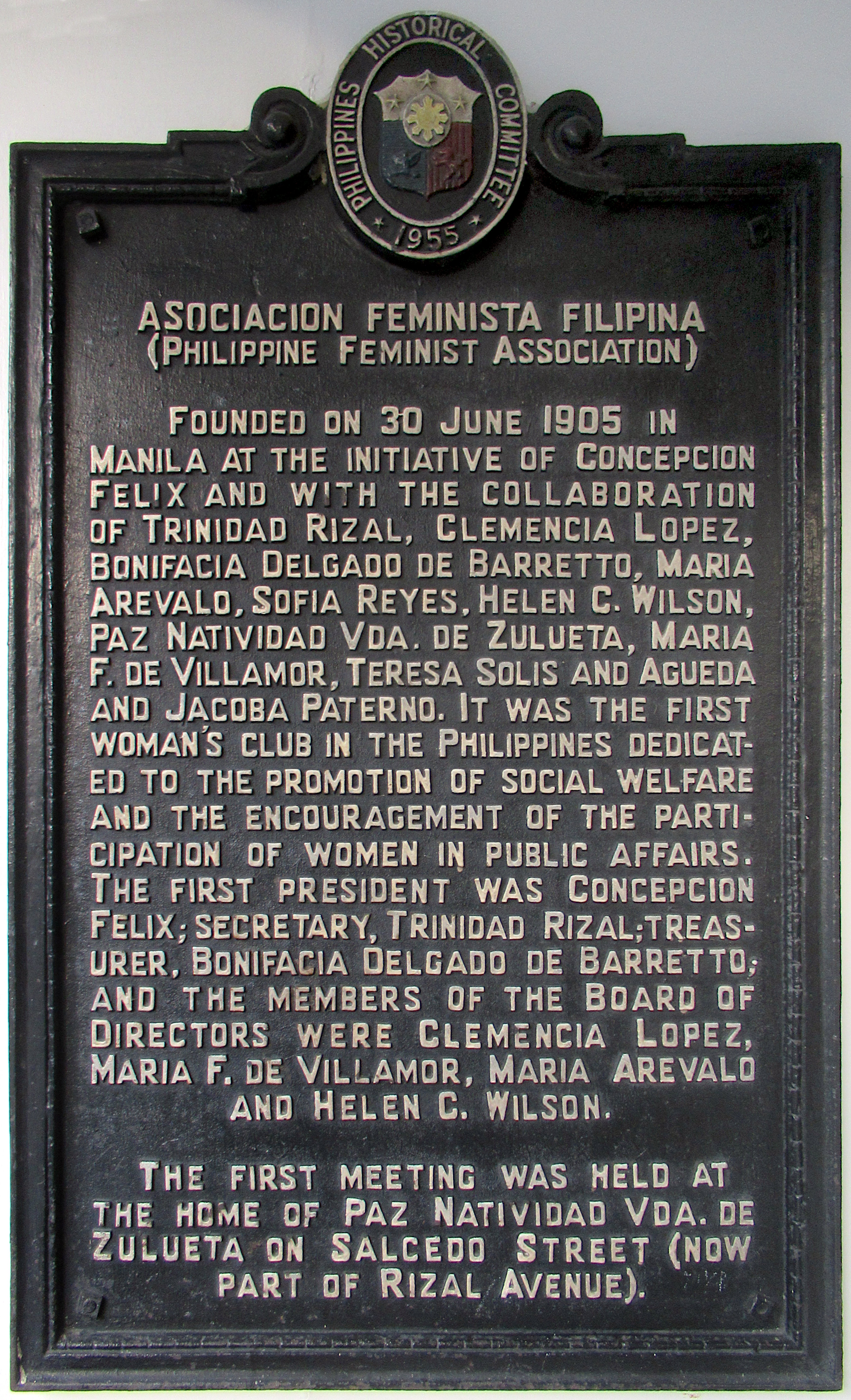
Historical marker created by the Philippines Historical Committee in 1955 to commemorate the organization

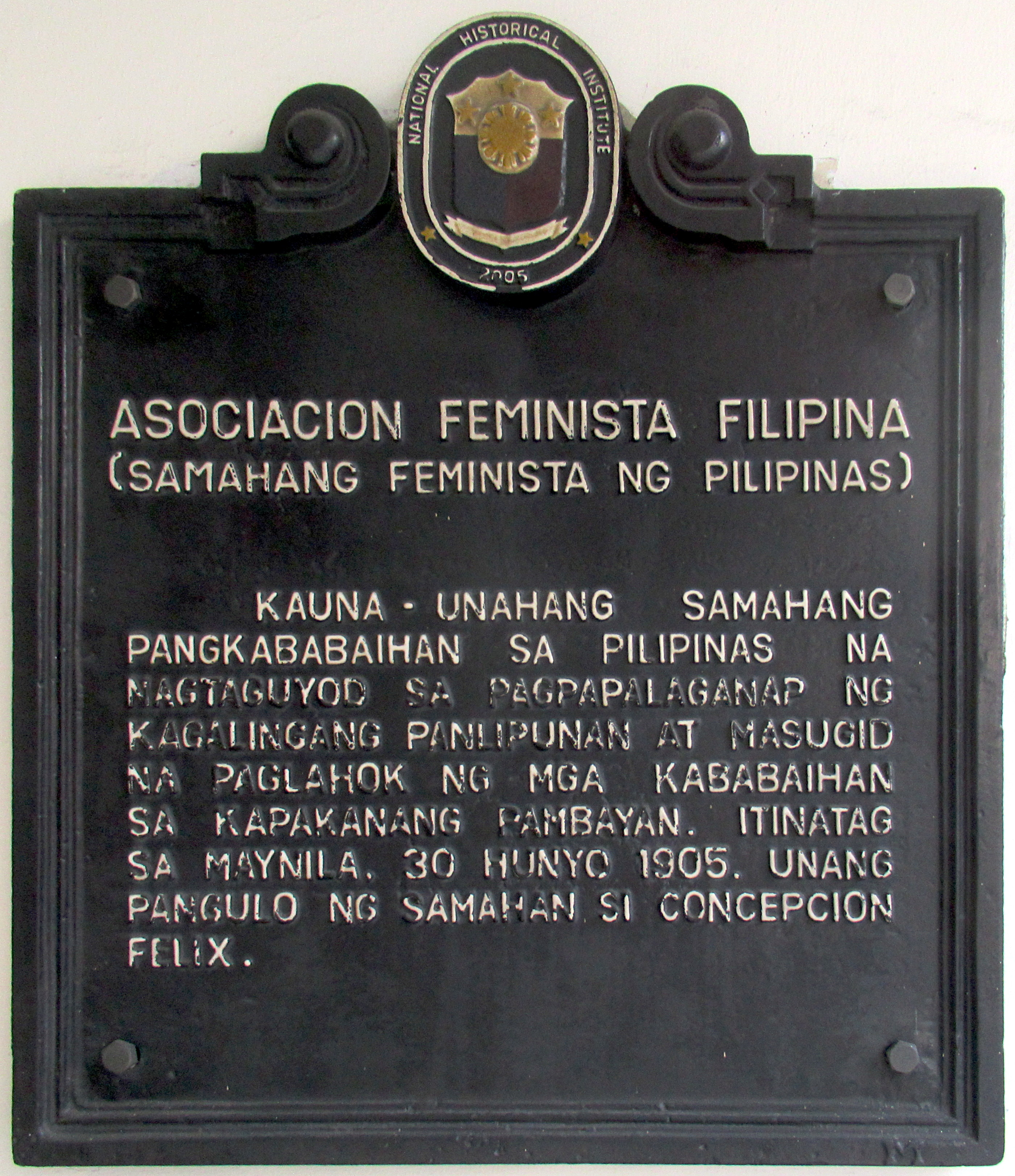
Historical marker created by the National Historical Institute in 2005 to commemorate the organization

The Asociación Feminista Filipina (Philippine Feminist Association) or AFF was a Filipino women's organization, founded in 1905. It was the first women's organization in the Philippines. The objective of the organization was the betterment of women's well-being regardless of class.

The association worked for women's political equality in municipal- and provincial level electorates and committees. It was also active within social welfare and improvement in the conditions of prisons, schools and work force.

== History ==
AFF was founded in Manila, Philippines on 30 June 1905 by its first president, Concepcion Felix Rodriguez, a working class woman. The organization was later joined by women from the elite like Trinidad Rizal, Librada Avelino, Maria Paz Guanzon, Maria Francisco, and Luisa de SilyarIt. AFF conducted its first meeting at Paz Natividad Vda. de Zulueta's residence on Salcedo Street, which later became part of Rizal Avenue.

It established the La Proteccion de la Infancia, Inc. and managed Gota de Leche, which advocates the health of children and women.
