= Rosa Sevilla de Alvero =

Filipino writer and activist

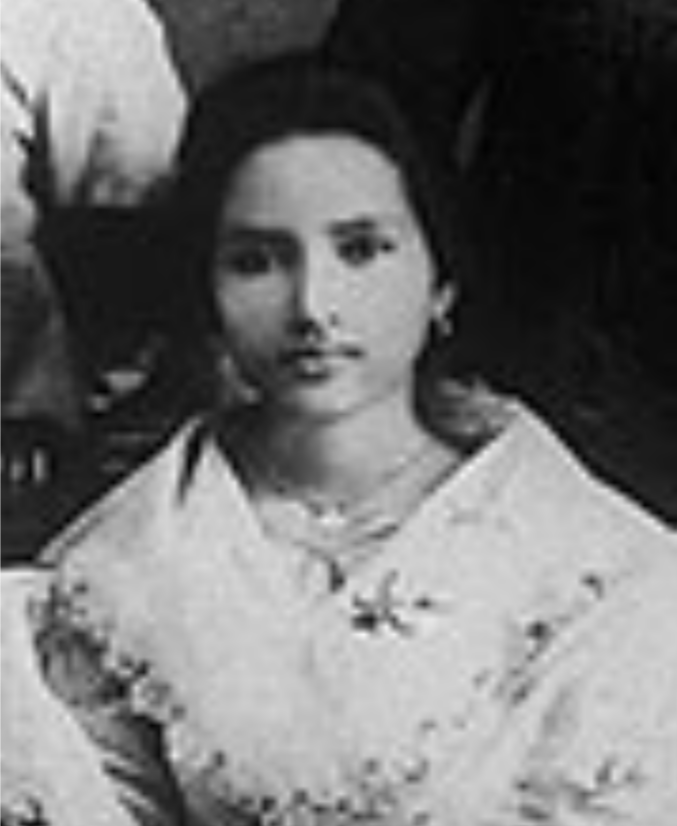
- Sevilla as a staff of the La Independencia newspaper, c. 1898
- Born: Rosa Lucia Sevilla y Tolentino; March 4, 1879; Tondo, Manila, Captaincy General of the Philippines
- Died: May 11, 1954 (aged 75); Quezon City, Philippines
- Known for: Women's suffrage in the Philippines
- Spouse: Emilio Alvero
- Children: 5
- Parent(s): Ambrosio Sevilla; Silvina Tolentino y Rafael

Rosa Sevilla de Alvero (born Rosa Lucia Sevilla y Tolentino; March 4, 1879 – May 11, 1954) was a Filipino activist, educator, and journalist who advocated for women's suffrage in the Philippines.

== Biography ==
Sevilla was born on March 4, 1879, in Tondo, Manila to Ambrosio Sevilla, a sergeant of the Spanish Army, and Silvina Tolentino y Rafael, a relative of revolutionary and playwright Aurelio Tolentino. She grew up with Tolentino her aunt who often invited nationalists and intellectuals who advocated against what they call "colonial education" into their home. She studied to be a teacher, then graduated “maestra superior” at Assumption College. She later became the first female Dean of the University of Santo Tomas, and established the Instituto de Mujeres (now Rosa Sevilla Memorial School) on July 15, 1900.

Sevilla was a part of the editorial staff for Antonio Luna's newspaper, La Independencia and also wrote Spanish language works such as La Mejor, El Sueno del Poeta, and Prisonera de Amor.

During the early years of the American colonial period, she founded the Instituto de Mujeres in Manila at age 21, which became one of the first women's schools in the Philippines. The institute provided a curriculum to women that would help them prepare "to serve both God and country" giving them an alternative to American-run schools which mostly forbade the teaching of religion, as well as language subjects on Spanish and indigenous languages.

Later, in her mid-30s, she led a movement in 1916 for Filipino women to secure the right to vote, founding the Liga Nacional de Damas Filipinas. It was in 1937 when women were able to gain the right after a referendum.

Sevilla had also worked in the field of journalism, in which she became the editor for Spanish daily La Vanguardia, and established The Woman's Outlook, a magazine published by the General Federation of Women's Clubs of the Philippines.

She died on May 11, 1954, at 75 years old.

== Personal life ==
She was married to Emilio Alvero, an artist.

== Awards ==
- (Philippines) Presidential Medal of Merit: July 4, 1948
- Queen Isabella II of Spain Award: 1948

== Tribute ==
On March 4, 2021, Google celebrated her 142nd birthday with a Google Doodle. A street in Loyola Heights, Quezon City, Philippines is named in her memory.
