= General de Jesus College =

Private college in Nueva Ecija, Philippines

- Dalubhasaang General de Jesus (Filipino)
- Former name: General de Jesus Academy (1946–1977)
- Motto: For God and Country
- Type: Private
- Established: 1946; 80 years ago
- Affiliations: Association of Christian Schools, Colleges and Universities
- Chairman: Carlo P. Mendez.
- President: Jeffrey P. Franco CPA, MBA
- Location: San Isidro, Nueva Ecija, Philippines; 15°18′28″N 120°54′15″E
- Campus: Urban
- Colors: Yellow and green
- Website: gendejesus.edu.ph
- Location in Nueva Ecija Location in Luzon Location in the Philippines

General de Jesus College (GJC), formerly known as General de Jesus Academy, is a private school located in the Poblacion, San Isidro, Nueva Ecija, the Philippines. It was founded in 1946.
