= Pilar Hidalgo-Lim =

Filipino educator and suffragist

- Born: Pilar Lardizabal Hidalgo; 24 May 1893; Boac, Batangas, Captaincy General of the Philippines
- Died: 8 December 1973 (aged 80); Manila, Philippines
- Spouse: Vicente Lim (m. 1917; died 1944)
- Children: 6, including Roberto
- Parent(s): Luis A. Hidalgo (father); Eulalia N. Lardizabal (mother)

Pilar Lardizabal Hidalgo-Lim (May 24, 1893 – December 8, 1973) was a Filipina educator and civic leader. She was married to Brig. Gen. Vicente Lim, World War II hero.

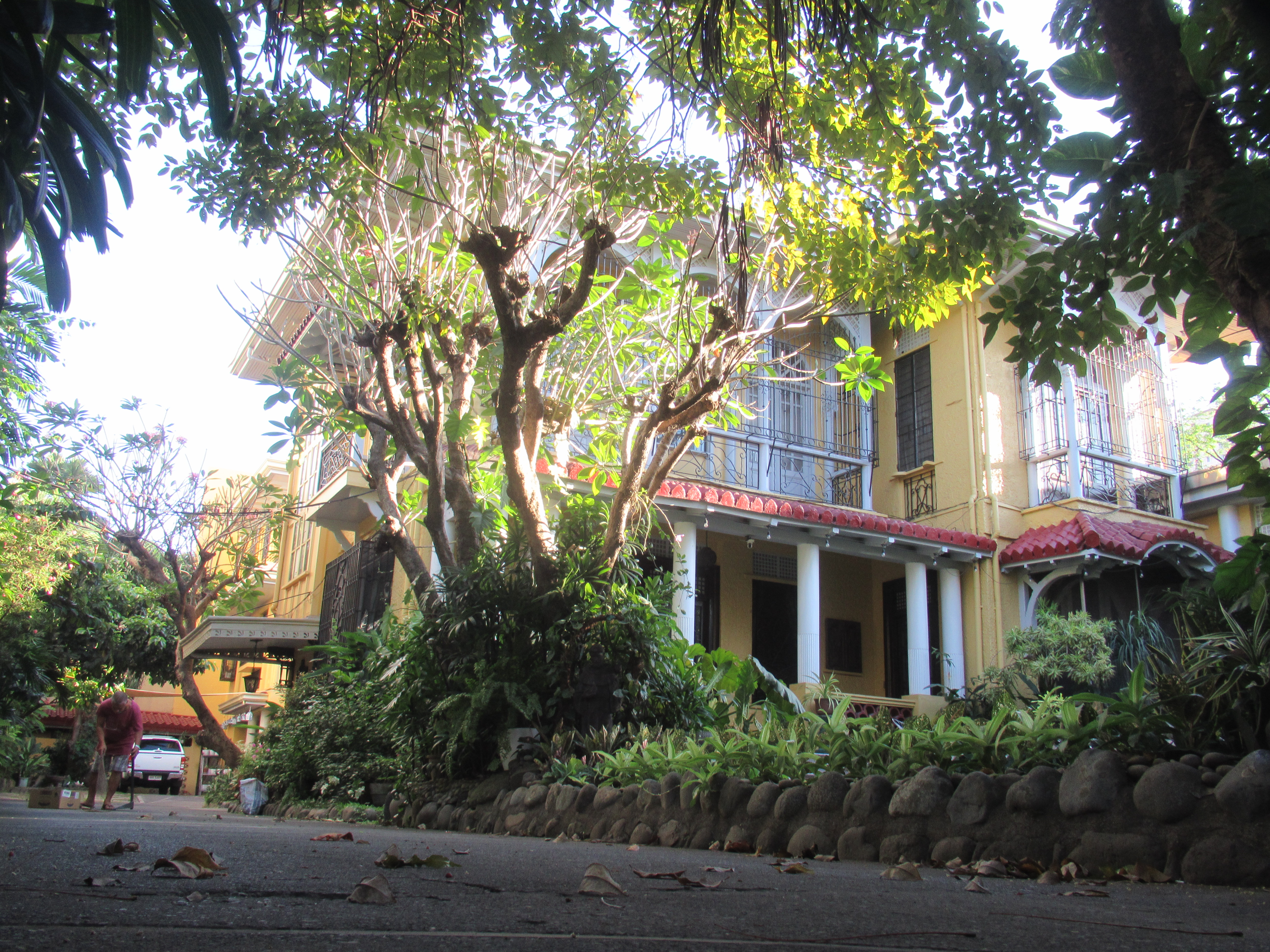
Vicente Lim and Pilar Hidalgo-Lim House

== Early career and pre-war years ==
Pilar Hidalgo-Lim graduated from the University of the Philippines, Bachelor of Arts, cum laude. She joined both the UP and Centro Escolar as a mathematics instructor. She married Lt. Vicente Lim, a West Point graduate, on August 12, 1917. They had six children: Luis, Roberto, Vicente Jr, Patricio, Eulalia, and Maria.

Hidalgo-Lim was active in civic affairs. She became President of the National Federation of Women's Clubs, and was an active supporter for women's suffrage, which President Manuel Quezon signed into law in 1937. In 1940, with Josefa Llanes Escoda, Hidalgo-Lim helped found the Girl Scouts of the Philippines. She also worked as a line producer for Parlatone Hispano-Filipino Studios, a Manila movie production company. Hidalgo-Lim and her children were in the United States when World War II started.

== Post-war years ==
Hidalgo-Lim and her family returned to the Philippines in 1946. Under President Elpidio Quirino Hidalgo-Lim was a member of the Board of Censors for Motion Pictures, the Parole Board, and the Integrity Board. She continued to serve in the first two agencies during the terms of Presidents Ramon Magsaysay and Carlos P. Garcia.

She became the Centro Escolar University's third president after the death of Carmen de Luna. She steered the university during the reconstruction and normalization of school operations after World War II.
