= 1937 Philippine women's suffrage plebiscite =

Referendum on the rights of Filipino women to vote

- April 30, 1937
- Are you in favor of granting suffrage to women?

Results
Choice	Votes	%
Yes	447,725	91.00%
No	44,307	9.00%
Total votes	492,032	100.00%
Registered voters/turnout	572,130	86%
- 300,000 affirmative votes by women are needed for the approval of the proposal

A plebiscite was held in the Philippine Commonwealth on April 30, 1937, to decide whether or not women could vote.

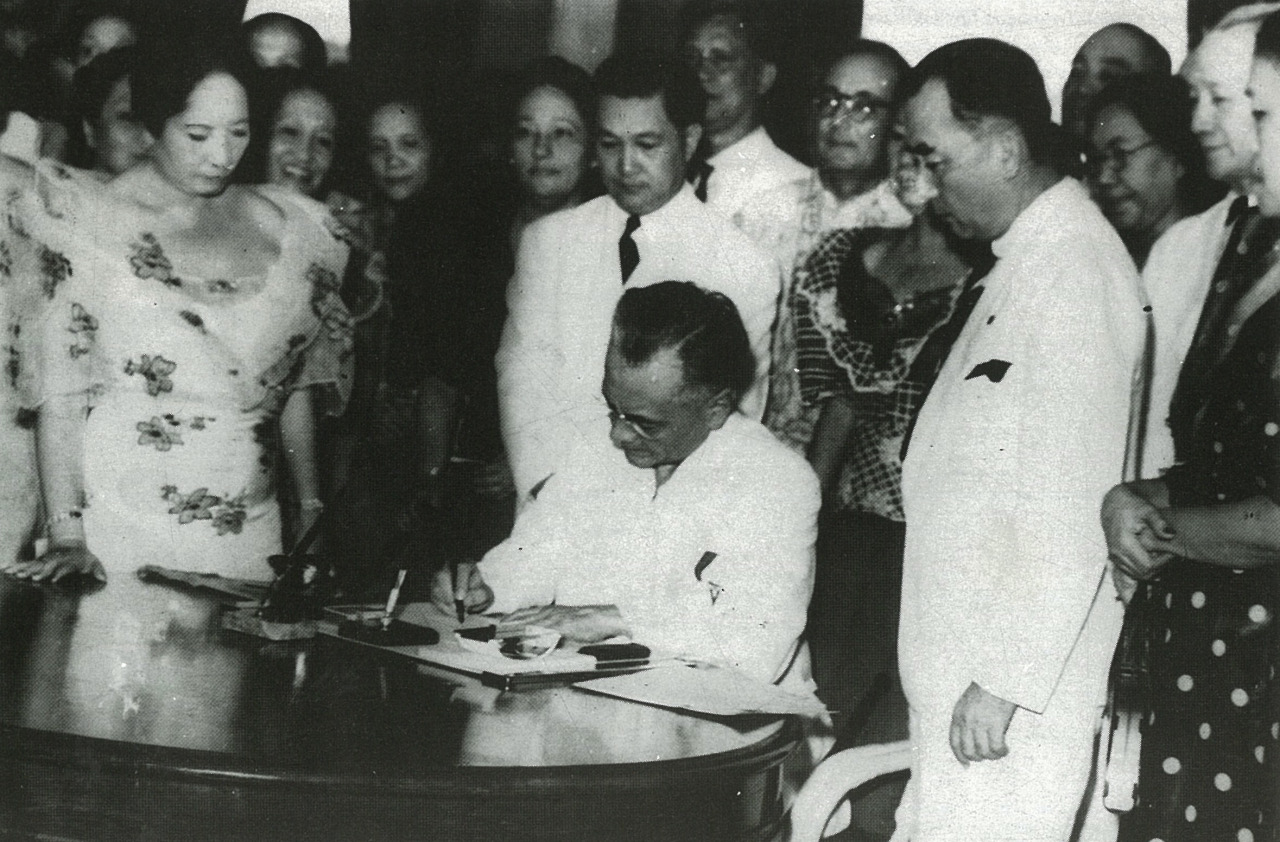
Philippine President Manuel L. Quezon (center) signing the Women’s Suffrage Bill following the 1937 plebiscite.

It is the culmination of the women's suffrage movement in the Philippines since the early 1900s.

The plebiscite was participated by women. 447,725 voters approved to grant suffrage to women surpassing the minimum 300,000 affirmative vote requirement.

== Background ==
=== Women's suffrage movement ===
Under the United States administration of the Philippines, the question of women's suffrage for Filipina women gained momentum.

It was upper and middle class Filipina women who led the campaign for women's suffrage in the Philippines. They also had help from American suffragist women and sympathetic American colonial officials including Governor Generals Francis Burton Harrison, Leonard Wood, and Frank Murphy.

The first bill was passed in the upper house in 1920. But no women's suffrage bill would become law until the 1930s.

Women's suffrage was opposed by conservatives which is seen as affront to "family values" Women were frequently alleged to not themselves desire suffrage by opponents. Women's ability to participate in politics was also viewed with skepticism.

In 1933, Act No. 4112 became law granting women the right to vote but this legislation was never implemented and was effectively revoked with the adoption of the 1935 constitution.

=== Legal basis ===
In 1934, the 1935 constitution was approved. Article 5 of the constitution stated that "The National Assembly shall extend the right of suffrage to women, if in a plebiscite which shall be held for that purpose within two years after the adoption of this Constitution, not less than three hundred thousand women possessing the necessary qualifications shall vote affirmatively on the question".

The National Assembly passed Commonwealth Act No. 34 which was approved on 30 September 1936; the act provided for the holding of the plebiscite for women's suffrage the following year. As mandated by Commonwealth Act No. 34, women who met the same qualification as men would be qualifies to vote in the plebiscite.

== Question ==
Voters were asked the following:

In English:

Are you in favor of granting suffrage to women?

In Spanish:

Esta Vd. en favor de la concesion del sufragio a las mujeres?

== Results ==
447,725 women voted in favor of extending the right to vote to women while 44,307 voted against.

Since the prerequisite of minimum of 300,000 affirmative votes was met, the right of suffrage was extended to women, in compliance with section 10 of Commonwealth Act No. 34.

Are you in favor of granting suffrage to women?
Choice	Votes	%
Yes	447,725	91.00
No	44,307	9.00
Total	492,032	100.00
Registered voters/turnout	572,130	86.00

In order to be approved, there should be 300,000 or more "Yes" votes.

1937 Philippine women's suffrage plebiscite results (excluding invalid votes)
Yes; 447,725 (91%)
▲50%

== Legacy ==
In 1947, 10 years after Philippine women were granted the right to vote, Geronima T. Pecson was elected as the first women senator. The election of Pecson prompted the entry of more women into governmental leadership positions, including the eventual election of two presidents, three vice presidents, congresswomen, senators, mayors, and many others. The Philippines is one of the earliest countries in Southeast Asia to have a female president, Corazon Aquino, who was elected to office on February 25, 1986. The country also has higher female representation in government relative to other Southeast Asian countries.

Teodoro Agoncillo hailed women's suffrage as one of the most significant achievement of the Philippine Commonwealth government.

The current Constitution of the Philippines, ratified in 1987, grants equality for both men and women, and guarantees the rights to suffrage, public service, political expression, and the right to information. The Philippines is also a signatory of the United Nations Convention on the Political Rights of Women (CEDAW).

== See also ==
- Commission on Elections
- Politics of the Philippines
- Philippine elections
- Suffrage
