= Mabini =

Mabini may refer to:

== People with the surname ==
- Apolinario Mabini (1864–1903), Philippine revolutionary leader
- Pamela Mabini (1978–2025), South African human rights activist

== Places in the Philippines ==
All of these are named after the Filipino revolutionary leader:

- Mabini, Batangas, municipality
- Mabini, Bohol, municipality
- Mabini, Cagdianao, barangay in the province of Dinagat Islands
- Mabini, Davao de Oro, municipality
- Mabini, Pangasinan, municipality
- Mabini, Tubajon, barangay in the province of Dinagat Islands

== Organizations ==
- Movement of Attorneys for Brotherhood, Integrity, and Nationalism (MABINI) - a human rights lawyers' organization in the Philippines

== See also ==
- BRP Apolinario Mabini (PS-36), a vessel in the Philippine Navy
- The Mabini Academy, a school in Lipa City, Batangas, Philippines
- Mabini Colleges, Inc., a school in Daet, Camarines Norte, Philippines
