= Mabini Shrine =

The Mabini Shrine can refer to:

- Mabini Shrine (Manila), a historic site and museum in Manila which marks the former residence of Apolinario Mabini
- Mabini Shrine (Batangas), a historic site and museum in Batangas which marks the birthplace of Apolinario Mabini
