= Irreconcilables (Philippines) =

Group of Filipino insurrectionists against U.S. rule

Irreconcilables, in the context of the Philippines, were a class of former insurrectionists deported to the island of Guam by the U.S. Military Government of the Philippines for their unwillingness to swear allegiance to the United States government after their capture by U.S. forces in the Philippine-American War.

== Deportation ==
The deportation was effectuated by an order issued by Major General Arthur MacArthur Jr., the then U.S. Military Governor of the Philippines. The order read as follows:

HEADQUARTERS DIVISION OF THE PHILIPPINES. Manila, P. I., January-7, 1901.

General Orders, No. 4.

In pursuance of authority obtained from the War Department by cable under date December 27, 1900, the following named persons, whose overt acts have clearly revealed them as in aid of, or in sympathy with, the insurrection and the irregular guerrilla warfare by which it is being maintained and whose continued residence in these Islands is, in every essential regard, inimical to the pacification thereof, will be deported at the earliest practicable date to the Island of Guam, there to be held under surveillance or in actual custody, as circumstances may require, during the further progress of hostilities and until such time as the restoration of normal peace conditions in the Philippines has resulted in a public declaration of the termination of such hostilities:

General officers: Artemio Ricarte, Pio del Pilar, Maximo Hizon, Mariano Llanera, Francisco de los Santos.
Colonels: Macario ile Ocampo, Ivstcbaii Consorles, Lucas Camerino.
Julian Geroiia.
Lieutenant-Colonels: Pedro Cubarrubias, Mariano Barruga, Her- niogenes Plata, Cornelio Requestis.
Major: Fabian Villaruel.
Subordinate insurgent officers: Juan Leandro Villarino, Jos Mata, Ygniidio de Jesus, Alipio Tecson.
Civil officials, insurgent agents, sympathizers and agitators: Apolinario Mabini, Pablo Ocanijio, Maxiinino Trias, Simon Tecson, Pio Varican, Anastasio Carmona, Mariano Sevilla, Lauuel R. Roxas.

By Command of Major General, MACARTHUR: THOMAS H. BARRY, Brigadier General, U. S. Volunteers,

Chief of Staff.

At the time this order was issued, the Philippine-American War was still underway. Prior to issuing this order, MacArthur had obtained authority to do so from the United States Secretary of War.

== Notable deportees ==
- Apolinario Mabini, Prime Minister of the First Philippine Republic
- Artemio Ricarte, Commanding General of the Philippine Revolutionary Army
- Pío del Pilar, Lieutenant General, Congressman from Negros Oriental
- Máximo Hizon, Congressman from Sorsogon
- Mariano Llanera, Lieutenant General
- Francisco de los Santos, General officer

== Detention and later release ==
An initial group of more than thirty leaders of Philippine Revolution, including Pío del Pilar and Apolinario Mabini were transported to Guam aboard the SS Rosecrans. Guam's Naval Governor, Seaton Schroeder, was unprepared for their arrival, and they remained aboard ship in Apra Harbor. A week later, on February 1, 1901, the USS Solace arrived with eleven more deportees, who were transferred to join the others on the Rosecrans while a three-acre site between the villages of Piti and Hagåtña, was razed and the construction of the Presidio de Asan (prison) began.

Apolinario Mabini sits outside his tent on Guam, 1902

On February 12, 43 prisoners and 15 servants disembarked at Piti and trekked for two miles to Asan, where they were initially housed under guard in tents. Construction of the prison was completed on March 22. Prison facilities included exercise equipment, a small library, a dining room, and a kitchen separated from the prison barracks run by servants. Each prisoner was assigned 28 square feet of floor space, an army cot, and shelf space for personal items.

Most deportees agreed to take the United States Oath of Allegiance after some time in detention and were returned to the Philippines. Mabini and Ricarte were exceptions.

Mabini refused to take the oath until February 1903, when he was formally notified that he could leave Guam for any destination other than the Philippines. He did not accept this, and on February 26, 1903, he took the oath in order to be allowed to return. He issued this statement to the press on the day he sailed:

After two long years I am returning, so to speak, completely disoriented and, what is worse, almost overcome by disease and sufferings. Nevertheless, I hope, after some time of rest and study, still to be of some use, unless I have returned to the Islands for the sole purpose of dying.

Mabini died from cholera in his home the age of 38 on May 13, 1903, less than three months after his return from exile.

Ricarte never took the oath. He was deported to Hong Kong in February 1903 and secretly returned to the Philippines in 1904. After being arrested and imprisoned, he was again deported to Hong Kong in 1910. He moved to Japan, living in Yokohama and returning to the Philippines in mid-1942, while the Philippines was occupied by the Empire of Japan.
