= Apolinario Mabini =

Prime Minister of the Philippines in 1899

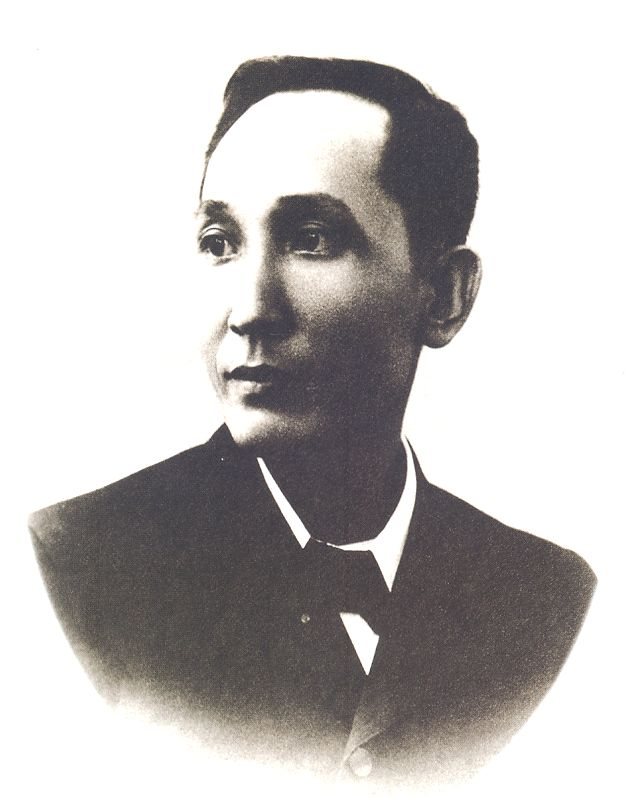

1st Prime Minister of the Philippines
- In office January 23, 1899 – May 7, 1899
- President: Emilio Aguinaldo
- Preceded by: Office established
- Succeeded by: Pedro Paterno

Secretary of Foreign Relations
- In office January 23, 1899 – May 7, 1899
- President: Emilio Aguinaldo
- Prime Minister: Himself
- Preceded by: Position established
- Succeeded by: Felipe Buencamino

Personal details
- Born: Apolinario Mabini y Maranán; July 23, 1864 Barrio Talaga, Tanauan, Captaincy General of the Philippines, Spanish Empire
- Died: May 13, 1903 (aged 38) Manila, Philippine Islands
- Cause of death: Cholera
- Party: Independent
- Education: Colegio de San Juan de Letran; University of Santo Tomas
- Occupation: Politician
- Profession: Lawyer

Apolinario Mabini y Maranán (Tagalog: [apolɪˈnaɾ.jo maˈbinɪ]; July 23, 1864 – May 13, 1903) was a Filipino revolutionary leader, educator, lawyer, and statesman who served first as a legal and constitutional adviser to the Revolutionary Government, and then as the first Prime Minister of the Philippines upon the establishment of the First Philippine Republic. He is regarded as the "utak ng himagsikan" or "brain of the revolution" and is also considered a national hero in the Philippines. Mabini's work and thoughts on the government shaped the Philippines' fight for independence over the next century.

Born on July 23, 1864, in Tanauan, Batangas, to poor parents—Inocencio Leon Mabini, an illiterate farmer, and Dionisia Maranan, a market vendor. He was the second of eight children.

Two of his works, El Verdadero Decálogo (The True Decalogue, June 24, 1898) and Programa Constitucional de la República Filipina (The Constitutional Program of the Philippine Republic, 1898), became instrumental in the drafting of what would eventually be known as the Malolos Constitution.

Mabini performed all his revolutionary and governmental activities despite having lost the use of both his legs to polio shortly before the Philippine Revolution of 1896.

Mabini's role in Philippine history saw him confronting first Spanish colonial rule in the opening days of the Philippine Revolution, and then American colonial rule in the days of the Philippine–American War. The latter saw Mabini captured and exiled to Guam by American colonial authorities, allowed to return only two months before his eventual death in May 1903.

== Early life and education ==
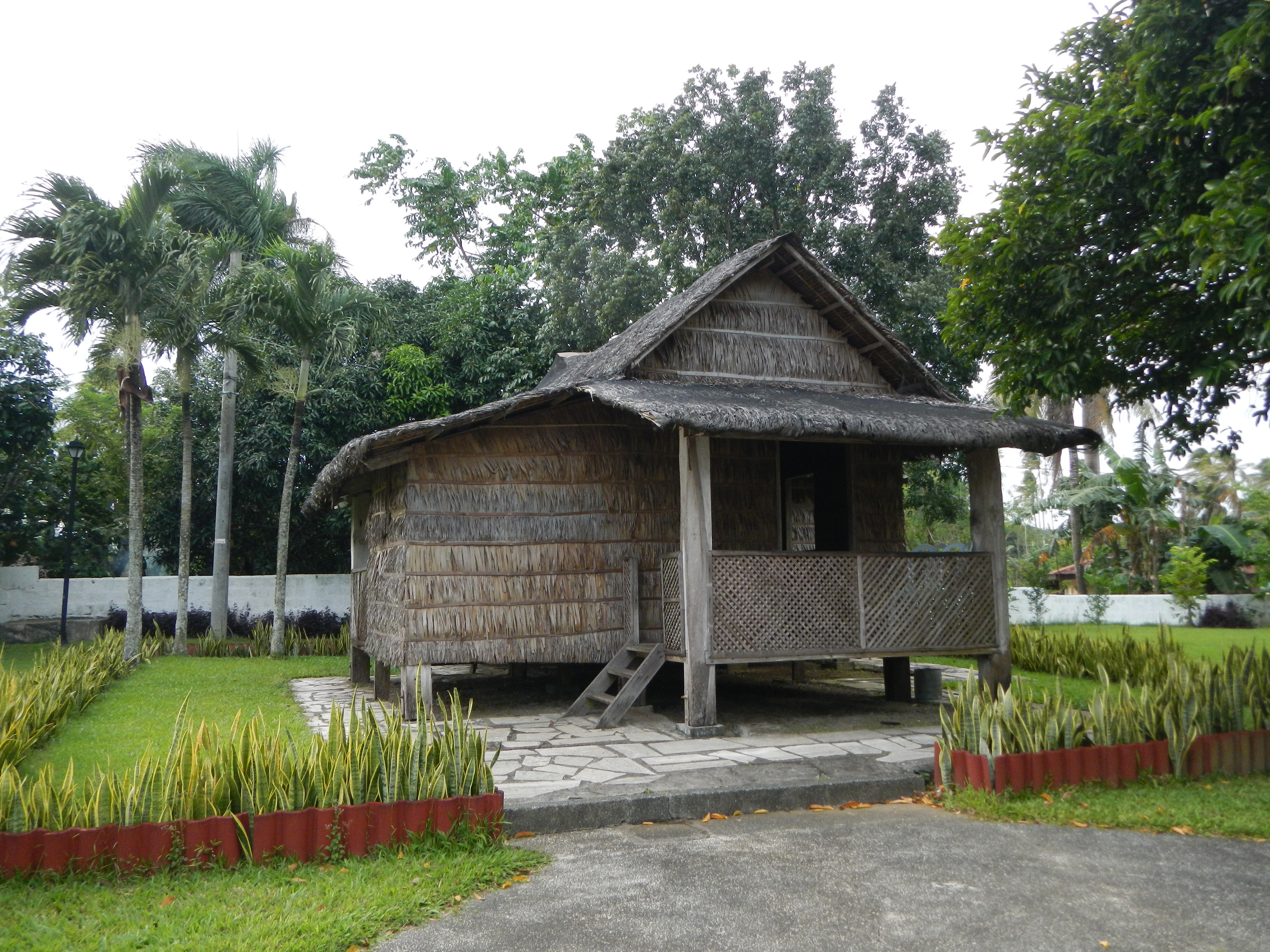
Replica of the house where Mabini was born and grew up, located at Apolinario Mabini Shrine in Tanauan, Batangas

Apolinario Mabini was born on July 23, 1864, in Barrio Talaga in Tanauan, Batangas. He was the second of eight children of Dionisia Maranan y Magpantay, a vendor in the Tanauan market, and Inocencio Leon Mabini y Lira, an illiterate peasant.

Apolinario Mabini attended the historical school of Father Valerio Malabanan located in Lipa. Being poor, Apolinario Mabini was able to get educated due to the Malabanan school's matriculation of students based on their academic merit rather than ability of the parents to pay. He would meet future leader Miguel Malvar while studying in Lipa.

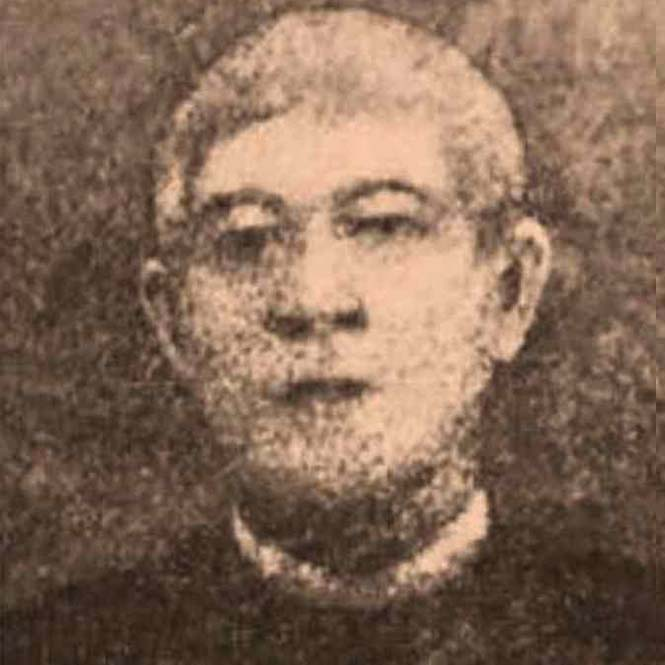
Valerio Malabanan took students into his school with academic merit regardless of ability to pay.

In 1881, Mabini received a scholarship from Colegio de San Juan de Letran in Manila. An anecdote about his stay there says that a professor there decided to pick on him because his shabby clothing clearly showed he was poor. Mabini amazed the professor by answering a series of very difficult questions with ease. His studies at Letran were periodically interrupted by a chronic lack of funds, and he earned money for his board and lodging by teaching children.

=== Law Studies ===
Mabini's mother had wanted him to enter the priesthood, but his desire to defend the poor made him decide to study law instead. A year after receiving his Bachiller en Artes with highest honors and the title Professor of Latin from Letran, he moved on to University of Santo Tomas in 1888, where he received his law degree in 1894.

Comparing Mabini's generation of Filipino intellectuals to the previous one of Jose Rizal and the other members of the propagandists movement, journalist and National Artist of the Philippines for Literature Nick Joaquin describes Mabini's generation as the next iteration in the evolution of Filipino intellectual development:

Europe had been a necessary catalyst for the generation of Rizal. By the time of Mabini, the Filipino intellectual had advanced beyond the need for enlightenment abroad[....] The very point of Mabini's accomplishment is that all his schooling, all his training, was done right here in his own country. The argument of Rizal's generation was that Filipinos were not yet ready for self-government because they had too little education and could not aspire for more in their own country. The evidence of Mabini's generation was that it could handle the affairs of government with only the education it had acquired locally. It no longer needed Europe; it had imbibed all it needed of Europe.

Mabini joined the Guild of Lawyers after graduation, but he did not choose to practice law in a professional capacity. He did not set up his own law office, and instead continued to work in the office of a notary public.

Instead, Mabini put his knowledge of law to much use during the days of the Philippine Revolution and the Filipino-American war. Joaquin notes that all his contributions to Philippine history somehow involved the law: "His was a legal mind. He was interested in law as an idea, as an ideal[...] whenever he appears in our history he is arguing a question of legality."

== Masonry and La Liga Filipina ==
Mabini joined the fraternity of Freemasonry in September 1892, affiliating with lodge Balagtas, and taking on the name "Katabay". The following year, Mabini became a member of La Liga Filipina, which was being resuscitated after the arrest of its founder José Rizal in 1892. Mabini was made secretary of its new Supreme Council. This was Mabini's first time to join an explicitly patriotic organization.

Mabini, whose advocacies favored the reformist movement, pushed for the organization to continue its goals of supporting La Solidaridad and the reforms it advocated.

When more revolutionary members of the Liga indicated that they did not think the reform movement was getting results and wanted to more openly support revolution, La Liga Filipina split into two factions: the moderate Cuerpo de Compromisarios, which wanted simply to continue to support the revolution, and the explicitly revolutionary Katipunan. Mabini joined the Cuerpo de Compromisarios.

When José Rizal, part of the "La Liga Filipina", was executed in December that year, however, he changed his mind and gave the revolution his wholehearted support.

=== Polio and eventual paralysis ===
Mabini was struck by polio in 1895, and the disease gradually incapacitated him until January 1896, when he finally lost the use of both his legs.

== Philippine Revolution ==
=== Arrest ===
When the plans of the Katipunan were discovered by Spanish authorities, and the first active phase of the 1896 Philippine Revolution began in earnest, Mabini, still ill, was arrested along with numerous other members of La Liga Filipina.

Thirteen patriots, later known as the "Thirteen Martyrs of Cavite", were arrested in Cavite, tried and eventually executed. José Rizal himself was accused of being party to the revolution, and would eventually be executed in December that year. When the Spanish authorities saw that Mabini was paralyzed, however, they decided to release him.

=== Adviser to the Revolutionary Government ===
Sent to the hospital after his arrest, Mabini remained in ill health for a considerable time. He was seeking the curative properties of the hot springs in Los Baños, Laguna in 1898 when Emilio Aguinaldo sent for him, asking him to serve as advisor to the revolution.

During this convalescent period, Mabini wrote the pamphlets "El Verdadero Decálogo" and "Ordenanzas de la Revolución". Aguinaldo was impressed by these works and by Mabini's role as a leading figure in La Liga Filipina, and made arrangements for Mabini to be brought from Los Baños to Kawit, Cavite. It took hundreds of men taking turns carrying his hammock to portage Mabini to Kawit.

He continued to serve as the chief adviser for General Aguinaldo after the Philippine Declaration of Independence on June 12. He drafted decrees and edited the constitution for the First Philippine Republic, including the framework of the revolutionary government which was implemented in Malolos in 1899.

== Prime Minister of the Philippines ==
Shortly after Aguinaldo's return to the Philippines from exile in Hong Kong in May 1898, he tasked Mabini with helping him establish a government. Mabini authored the June 18, 1898, decree which established the Dictatorial Government of the Philippines. After the Malolos Constitution, the basic law of the First Philippine Republic, was promulgated on January 21, 1899, Mabini was appointed Prime Minister and also Foreign Minister. He then led the first cabinet of the republic.

Mabini often clashed with the Malolos Congress, as he believed the legislative body’s powers increasingly infringed upon those of the executive branch. A notable instance of his uncompromising character occurred when his nomination to the Supreme Court was challenged on the basis of his physical disability; when told he could not serve because he was lame, Mabini famously retorted, "Why? Does the job entail a lot of walking?". In a memorandum to President Emilio Aguinaldo in January 1899, Mabini formally warned against constitutional provisions that would require Congress to approve all cabinet appointments, fearing it would undermine executive authority.

Serving as both Prime Minister and the nation's first Secretary of Foreign Affairs, Mabini acted as a key adviser to Aguinaldo, often referred to as the government’s cámara negra (Black Cabinet). He is noted by historians for his personal integrity, having entered and departed from government service in poverty despite the significant influence he wielded.

Mabini remained vigilant against the influence of the local elite on state affairs. He strongly advised the President against a proposed loan scheme involving wealthy individuals, which would have been secured by the rentals of government estates. Under this proposal, a "Permanent Commission" of the Board of Treasury—composed of major stockholders—would have been empowered to oversee the Treasury and utilize income from personal taxes if estate rentals proved insufficient. Mabini cautioned that this arrangement would effectively grant the Board control over the government’s finances, arguing that "if they controlled the purse, then they controlled the government".

Mabini found himself in the center of the most critical period in the new country's history, grappling with problems until then unimagined. Most notable of these were his negotiations with Americans, which began on March 6, 1899. The United States and the Philippine Republic were embroiled in extremely contentious and eventually violent confrontations. During the negotiations for peace, Americans proffered Mabini autonomy for Aguinaldo's new government, but the talks failed because Mabini's conditions included a ceasefire, which was rejected. Mabini negotiated once again, seeking for an armistice instead, but the talks failed yet again. Eventually, feeling that the Americans were not negotiating 'bona fide,' he forswore the Americans and supported war. He resigned from government on May 7, 1899.

== Exile and return ==
The Philippine–American War saw Mabini taken more seriously as a threat by the Americans than he was under the Spanish:

Says National Artist for Literature F. Sionil Jose:

The Spaniards underestimated Mabini primarily because he was a cripple. Had they known of his intellectual perspicacity, they would have killed him earlier. The Americans did not. They were aware of his superior intelligence, his tenacity when he faced them in negotiations for autonomy and ceasefire.

Apolinario Mabini sits outside his tent in Guam – 1902

On December 10, 1899, he was captured by Americans at Cuyapo, Nueva Ecija. He was captured by troopers of the 4th Cavalry Regiment. He was imprisoned after his capture, though he was in bad health, and was exiled to the island of Guam for refusing to take the oath of allegiance to the United States along with other revolutionists Americans referred to as insurrectos (rebels) or Irreconcilables.

Mabini returned to the Philippines after agreeing to take the Oath of Allegiance to the United States on February 26, 1903, before the Collector of Customs. On the day he sailed, he issued this statement to the press:

After two long years I am returning, so to speak, completely disoriented and, what is worse, almost overcome by disease and sufferings. Nevertheless, I hope, after some time of rest and study, still to be of some use, unless I have returned to the Islands for the sole purpose of dying.

Mabini resumed his work of agitating for independence for the Philippines soon after his return from exile.

== Death ==
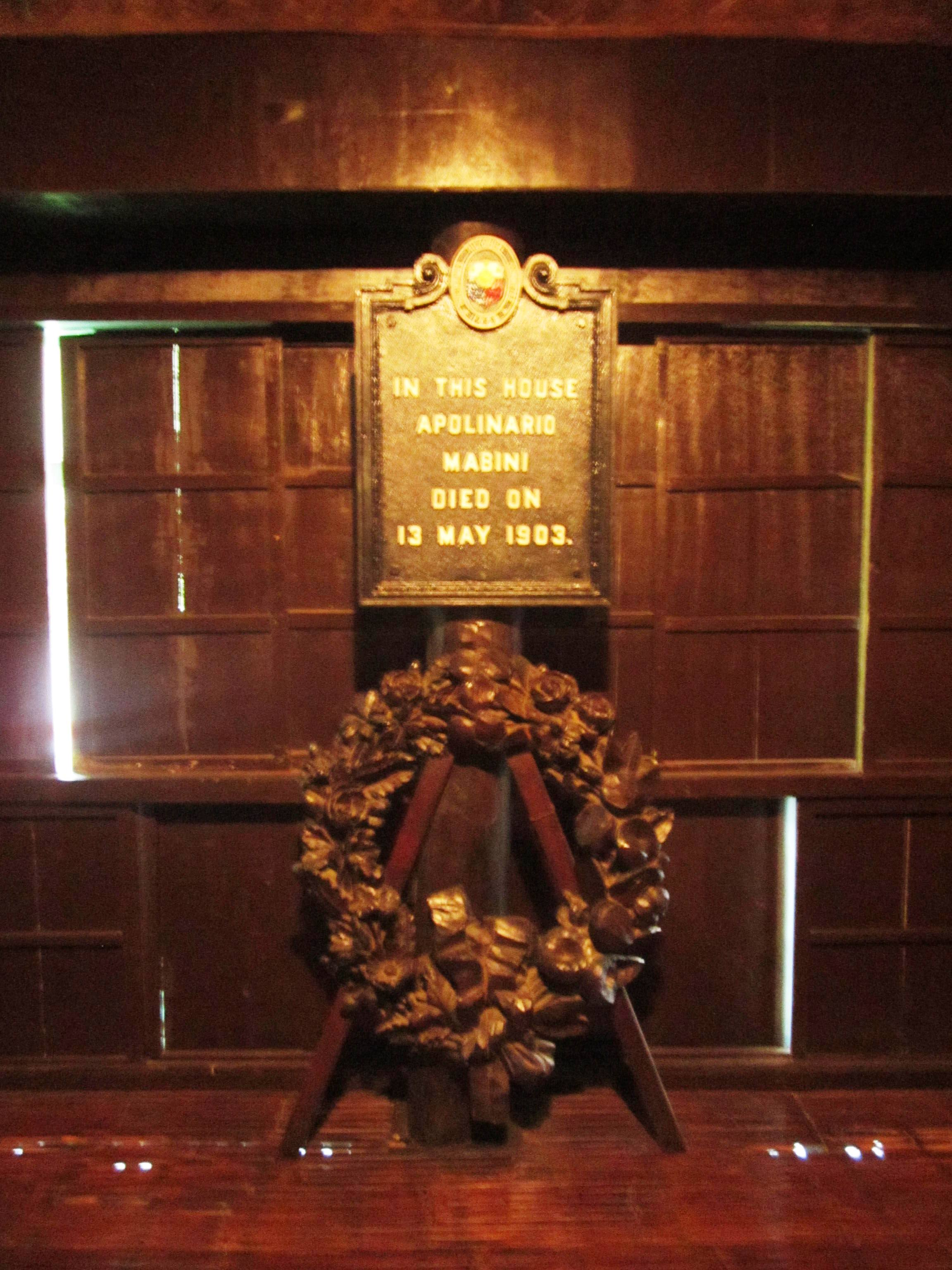
The marker of Mabini's death inside the antesala room of Mabini Shrine in Manila where he died

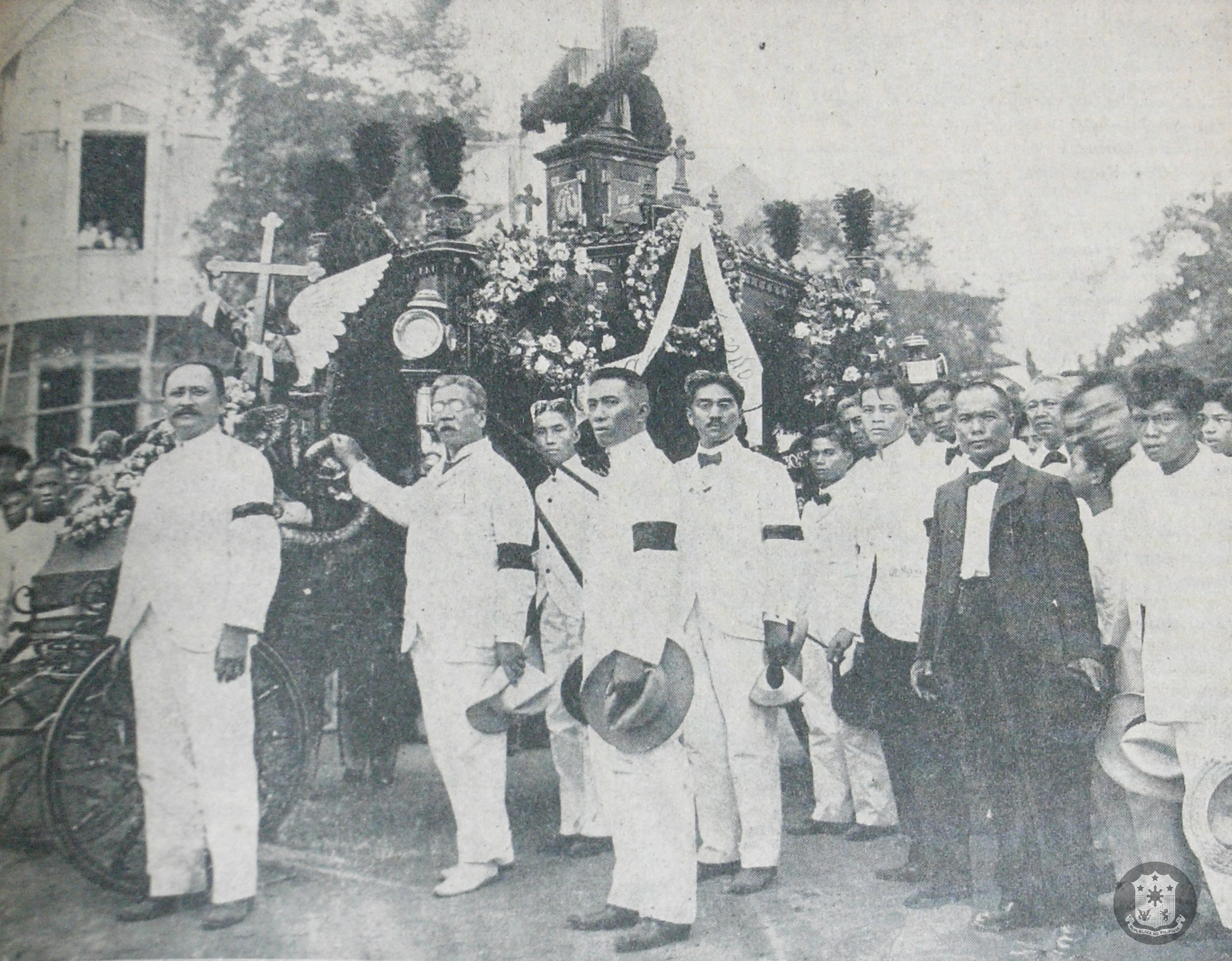
Funeral of Apolinario Mabini on May 16, 1903

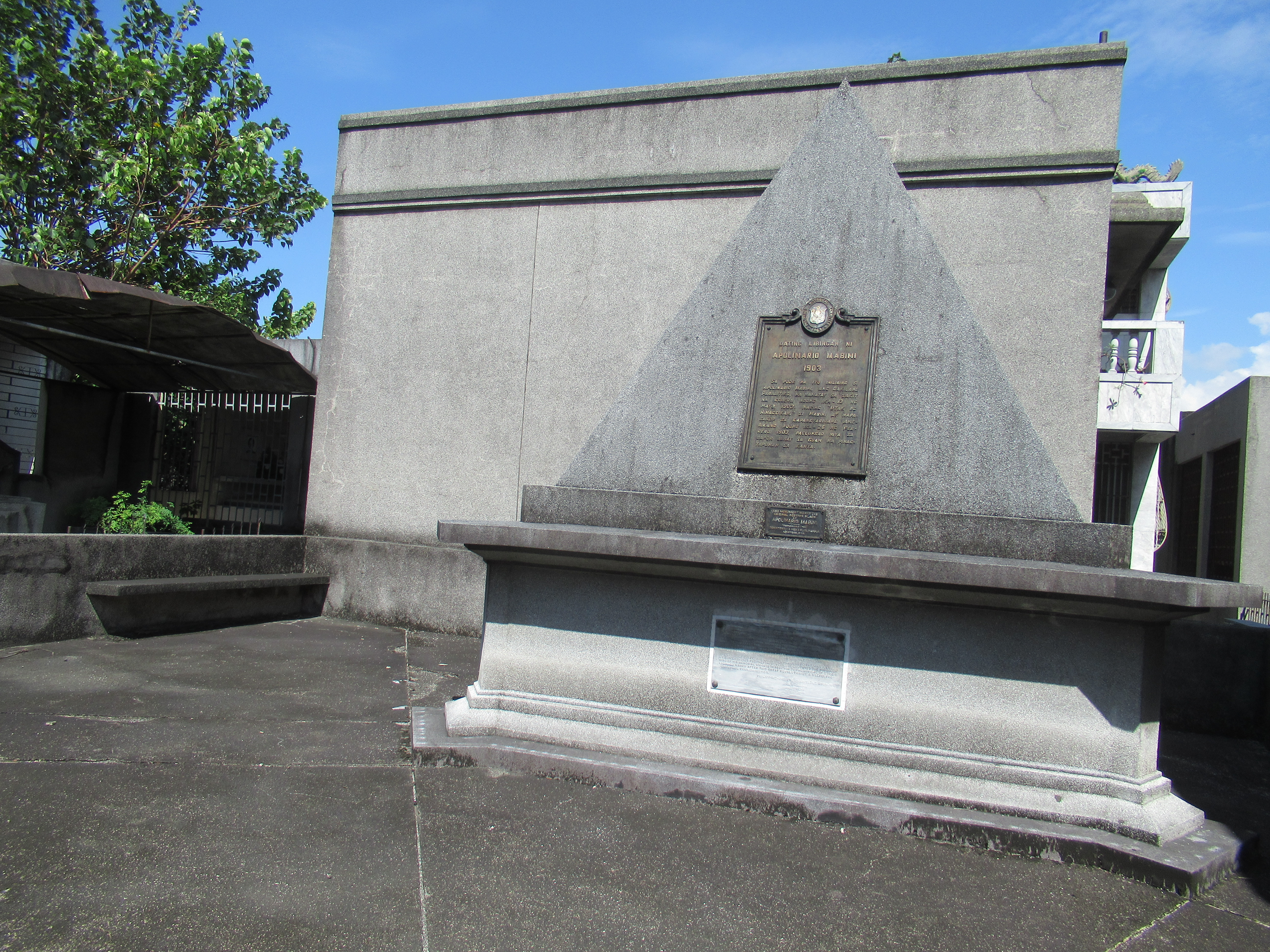
Mabini's grave at the Manila Chinese Cemetery.

Not long after his return, Mabini died of cholera at his home at 21 Calle Nagtahan, Manila, on May 13, 1903, at the age of 38, after consuming an unpasteurized and contaminated carabao milk. His funeral at the Binondo Church was attended by around 8,000 people, mostly Filipinos, including the foremost members of the Iglesia Filipina Independiente who took over and occupied the Binondo Church at the time.

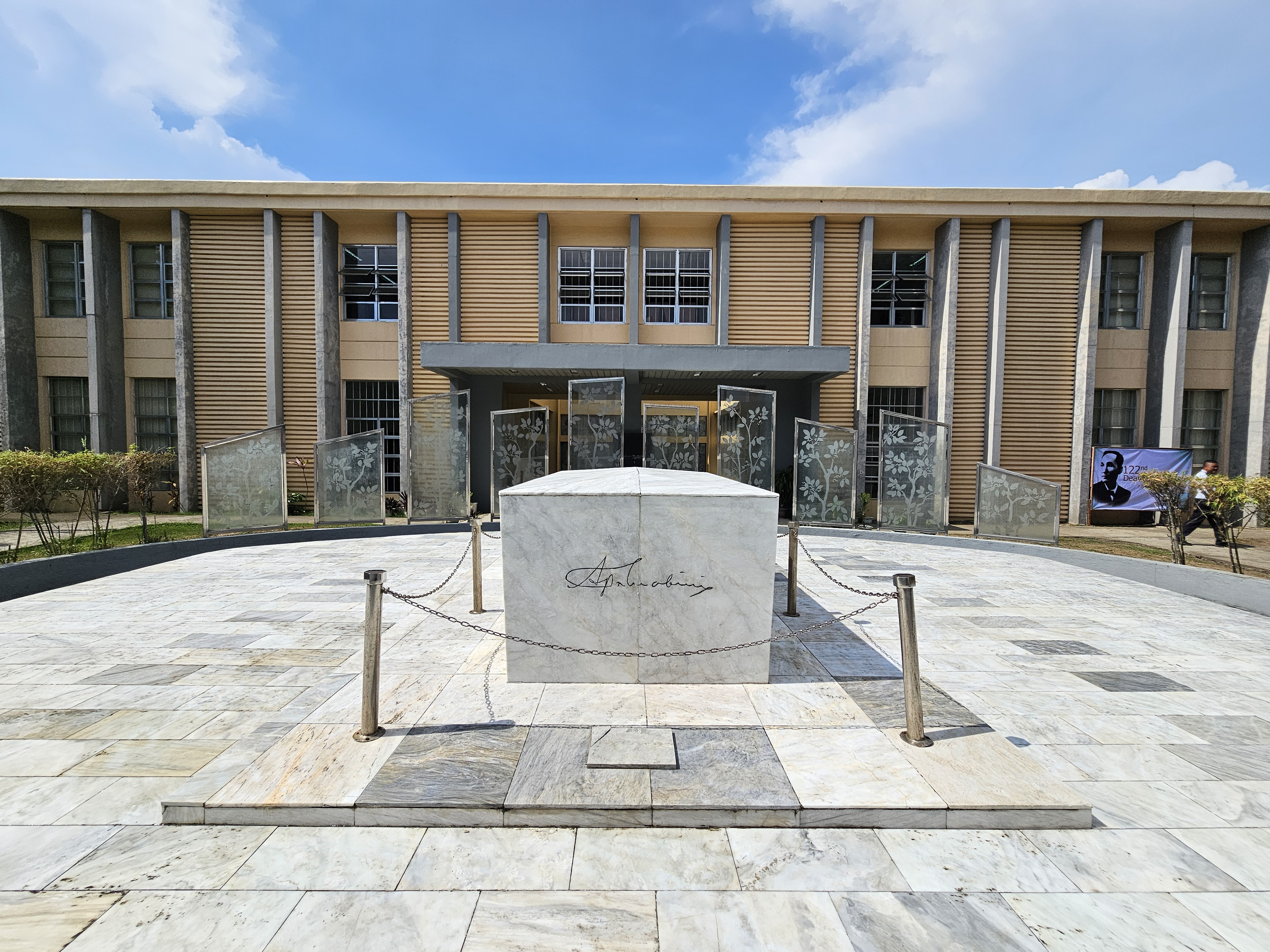
Current resting place of Mabini at the Mabini Shrine in Tanauan, Batangas

His remains were initially interred at the Manila Chinese Cemetery, marked by a triangular pyramid (symbolizing his Masonic beliefs) on a raised pedestal. Subsequently, they were transferred to the Mausoleo de los Veteranos de la Revolucion in the nearby Manila North Cemetery before finally being relocated to the newly-inaugurated Apolinario Mabini Shrine in Tanauan, Batangas, on his 92nd birth anniversary on July 23, 1956.

== Controversy about Mabini's paralysis ==
Even during his lifetime, there were controversial rumors regarding the cause of Mabini's paralysis. Infighting among members of the Malolos congress led to the spread of rumors that Mabini's paralysis had been caused by venereal disease - specifically, syphilis. This was finally debunked in 1980, when Mabini's bones were exhumed and the autopsy proved conclusively that the cause of his paralysis was polio.

This information reached National Artist F. Sionil José too late, however. By the time the historian Ambeth Ocampo told him about the autopsy results, he had already published Po-on, the first novel of his Rosales Saga. That novel contained plot points based on the premise that Mabini had indeed become a paralytic due to syphilis.

In later editions of the book, the novelist corrected the error and issued an apology, which reads in part:

I committed a horrible blunder in the first edition of Po-on. No apology to the august memory of Mabini no matter how deeply felt will ever suffice to undo the damage that I did.... According to historian Ambeth Ocampo who told me this too late, this calumny against Mabini was spread by the wealthy mestizos around Aguinaldo who wanted Mabini's ethical and ideological influence cut off. They succeeded. So, what else in our country has changed?

In the later editions, Mabini's disease - an important plot point - was changed to an undefined liver ailment. The ailing Mabini takes pride in the fact that his symptoms are definitely not those of syphilis, despite the rumors spread by his detractors in the Philippine Revolutionary government.

== Legacy ==
Mabini's complex contributions to Philippine History are often distilled into two historical monikers: "Brains of the Revolution," and "Sublime Paralytic". Contemporary historians such as Ambeth Ocampo point out, though, that these two monikers are reductionist and simplistic, and "do not do justice to the hero's life and legacy."

=== "Brains of the Revolution" ===
Because of his role as advisor during the formation of the revolutionary government, and his contributions as statesman thereafter, Mabini is often referred to as the "Brains of the Revolution", a historical moniker he sometimes shares with Emilio Jacinto, who served in a similar capacity for the earlier revolutionary movement, the Katipunan.

=== "Sublime Paralytic" ===
Mabini is also famous for having achieved all this despite having lost the use of his legs to polio just prior to the Philippine revolution. This has made Mabini one of the Philippines' most visually iconic national heroes, such that he is often referred to as "The Sublime Paralytic" (Tagalog: Dakilang Lumpo).

=== Shrines ===
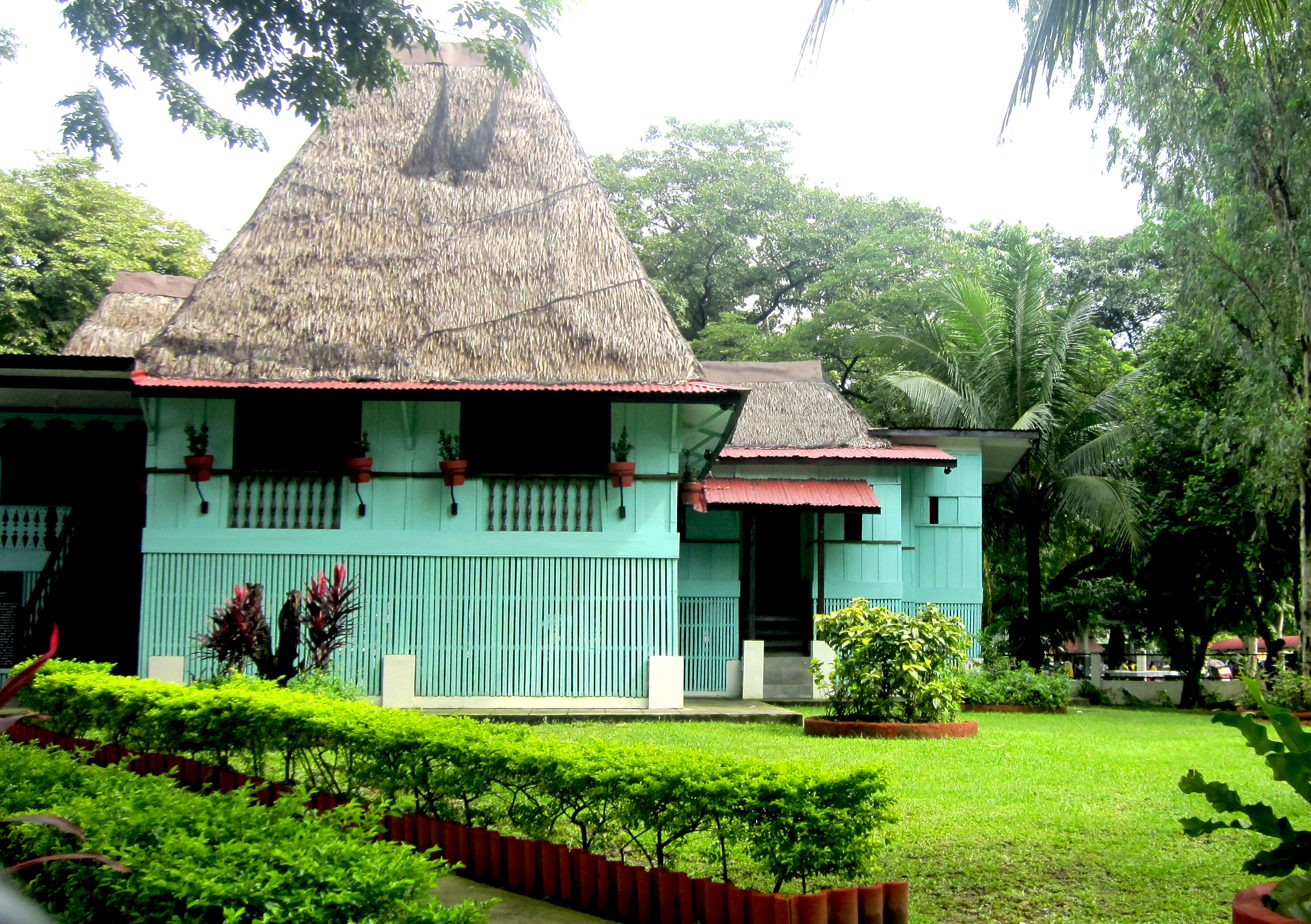
The Mabini Shrine, now located in the Polytechnic University of the Philippines (PUP) campus in Santa Mesa, Manila

- Two sites related to Mabini have been chosen to host shrines in his honor:
  - The house where Mabini died is now located in the campus of the Polytechnic University of the Philippines (PUP) in Santa Mesa, Manila, having been moved twice. The original location was within the PSG Compound inside the Malacanang Park. The simple nipa retains the original furniture, and some of the books he wrote, and also contains souvenir items, while hosting the municipal library and reading facilities.
  - Mabini was buried in his town of birth - what is now Barangay Talaga, Tanauan City, Batangas. An interactive museum containing historical artifacts, his personal belongings, books he authored, and historical information about him, the Philippines during his era, and his town's historical background was inaugurated on this site in 1956. Recently renovated and improved, it continues to serve as a tribute to his legacy. It also sells books about him and souvenir items. A replica of the house Mabini was born in was also constructed on the site.
- Two monuments to Mabini and the 41 other insurrectos imprisoned in Agat, Guam are located at the site of their prison camp, now part of the War in the Pacific National Historical Park.

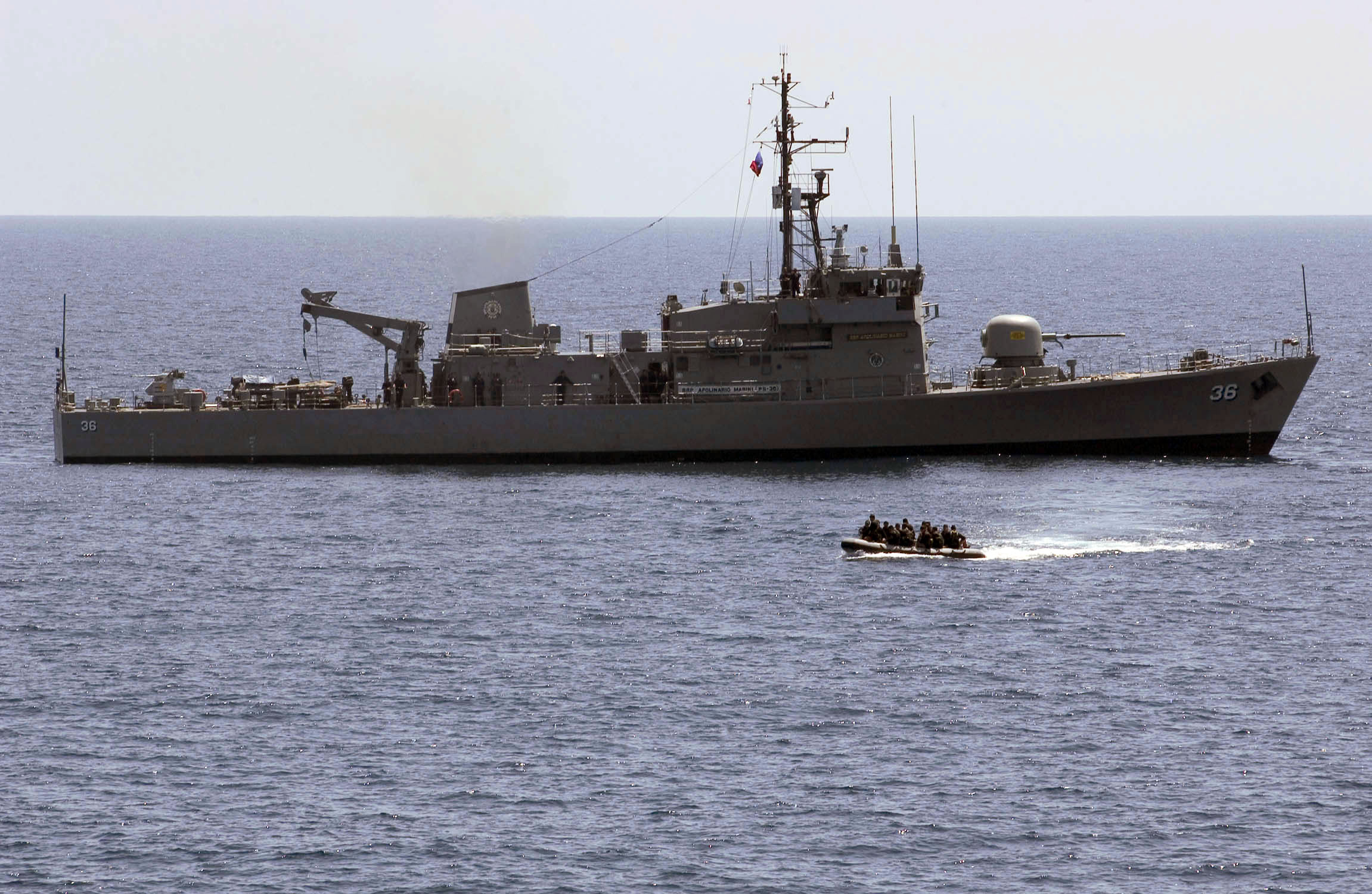
The BRP Apolinario Mabini (PS-36)

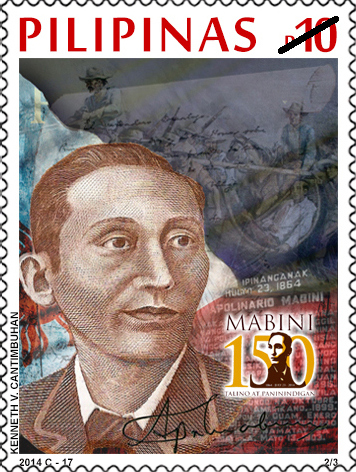
2014 Philippine stamp showing Mabini

=== Place names ===
- Four Philippine municipalities are named after Mabini:
  - Mabini, Batangas,
  - Mabini, Bohol,
  - Mabini, Davao de Oro, and
  - Mabini, Pangasinan
- The main campus of the Polytechnic University of the Philippines (PUP) in Santa Mesa, Manila was named after Apolinario Mabini by Dr. Nemesio Prudente, when he reorganized the university in 1988.
- Mabini Street in the Ermita and Malate districts of Manila.
- Other streets of the namesake in the following barangays:
  - Kapasigan in Pasig
  - West Rembo in Taguig
  - Mabini-J. Rizal in Mandaluyong
  - Addition Hills in both Mandaluyong and San Juan, Metro Manila
  - Sangandaan in Caloocan
  - Tipo in Hermosa, Bataan
  - Barangay 11 and Kumintang Ibaba in Batangas City
  - Daungan in Mauban, Quezon
- The Mabini Academy is a school in Lipa City, Batangas named after Mabini. The school logo carries Mabini's Image.
- Mabini Colleges, Inc is an academic institution in Daet, Camarines Norte, Philippines.
- Apolinario Mabini Superhighway, widely known as the Southern Tagalog Arterial Road or STAR Tollway, is an expressway that connect the province of Batangas to the South Luzon Expressway.
- Mabini Bridge, formerly known as Nagtahan Bridge in the city of Manila, was renamed in his honor.
- Mabini reef, also referred to as Johnson South Reef, is a reef claimed by the Philippines in the Spratly Islands in the South China Sea. It is currently controlled by China. In addition to the Philippines and China, its ownership is also disputed by Brunei, Malaysia, Taiwan, and Vietnam.

=== Naval Vessels ===
- The Philippine Navy's Jacinto class corvette, BRP Apolinario Mabini (PS-36), is also named after Mabini.

=== Philippine Peso ===
- Mabini's face adorns the Philippine ten peso coin, previously alongside Andrés Bonifacio.
  - The newer series (New Generation Currency Series) only has Mabini.
  - He was also featured on the ten peso bill that circulated or printed starting with the Pilipino Series in 1972 and continued until the Bangko Sentral ng Pilipinas stopped printing these notes (New Design series version) in 2001. From 1972 to 1997, he was the only one to portray on the front of the banknote until it added Andrés Bonifacio that were printed from 1997 to 2001.
  - He was previously featured on the one peso bill from 1949-1961

=== Government Awards and Citations ===
- The Gawad Mabini is awarded to Filipinos for distinguished foreign service, or promoting the interests and prestige of the Philippines abroad. It was established on June 24, 1974, by President Ferdinand Marcos through Presidential Decree No. 490, s. 1974 in Mabini's honor since he was the first Secretary of Foreign Affairs of the First Philippine Republic.
- The Philippine government presents the annual Apolinario Mabini Awards to outstanding persons with disabilities.

== Media portrayals and in fiction ==
- Mabini was portrayed by:
  - Ronnie Quizon in the film, El Presidente (2012).
  - Delphine Buencamino (2015), Liesl Batucan (2016), Monique Wilson (2019) and Shaira Opsimar (2026) in the musical "Mabining Mandirigma"
  - Epy Quizon in the film, Heneral Luna (2015), and its sequel, Goyo: Ang Batang Heneral (2018).
    - At the height of the film Heneral Luna's popularity, reports of numerous incidents - including one during a Q&A with actor Epy Quizon - in which school-age youths asked why Mabini just sat in a chair throughout the film, implying a lack of familiarity with the famously paralytic statesman. Even President Benigno Aquino III remarked on the implications of the lack of awareness among students, saying "even if only a few students said this, we can say that this is a reflection of how little some of the youth know about history. Later, I will call up (Education Secretary) Armin (Luistro) to act on this."
- F. Sionil Jose's Po-on (in English: "Dusk") has Mabini visit Rosales, Pangasinan during the Philippine Revolution.

== Selected works ==
- The True Decalogue (El Verdadero Decalogo, June 24, 1898)
- Contestaciones y Consideraciones Al Pueblo y Congreso Norte-Americanos
- Ordenanzas de la Revolucion
- Programa Constitucional dela Republica Filipina (The Constitutional Program of the Philippine Republic) (circa, 1898)
- La Revolución Filipina (The Philippine Revolution, 1931)

== Quotes ==
=== From Mabini ===
- Describing his cabinet:

...it belongs to no party, nor does it desire to form one; it stands for nothing save the interest of the fatherland.

- On Emilio Aguinaldo and his cabinet members:

The Revolution failed because it was badly directed, because its leader won his post not with praiseworthy but with blameworthy acts, because instead of employing the most useful men of the nation he jealously discarded them. Believing that the advance of the people was no more than his own personal advance, he did not rate men according to their ability, character and patriotism but according to the degree of friendship or kinship binding him to them; and wanting to have favorites willing to sacrifice themselves for him, he showed himself lenient to their faults. Because he disdained the people, he could not but fall like an idol of wax melting in the heat of adversity. May we never forget such a terrible lesson learned at the cost of unspeakable sufferings!

=== About Mabini ===
- By former Military Governor of the Philippines, Gen. Arthur MacArthur, describing Mabini before the US Senate's Lodge Committee of 1902:

Mabini is a highly educated young man who, unfortunately, is paralyzed. He has a classical education, a very flexible, imaginative mind, and Mabini's views were more comprehensive than any of the Filipinos that I have met. His idea was a dream of a Malay confederacy. Not the Luzon or the Philippine Archipelago, but I mean of that blood. He is a dreamy man, but a very firm character and of very high accomplishments. As said, unfortunately, he is paralyzed. He is a young man, and would undoubtedly be of great use in the future of those islands if it were not for his affliction.

- By President Benigno Aquino III, reacting to Philippine students' apparent lack of familiarity with Mabini in 2015, when Mabini was portrayed in the film Heneral Luna:

We cannot question the depth and breadth of the contribution to our country of the man we call the Sublime Paralytic and the Brains of the Revolution. He represented the intelligence and convictions of the Filipino people. His sharp mind was his weapon to strengthen the foundation of our democratic institution.

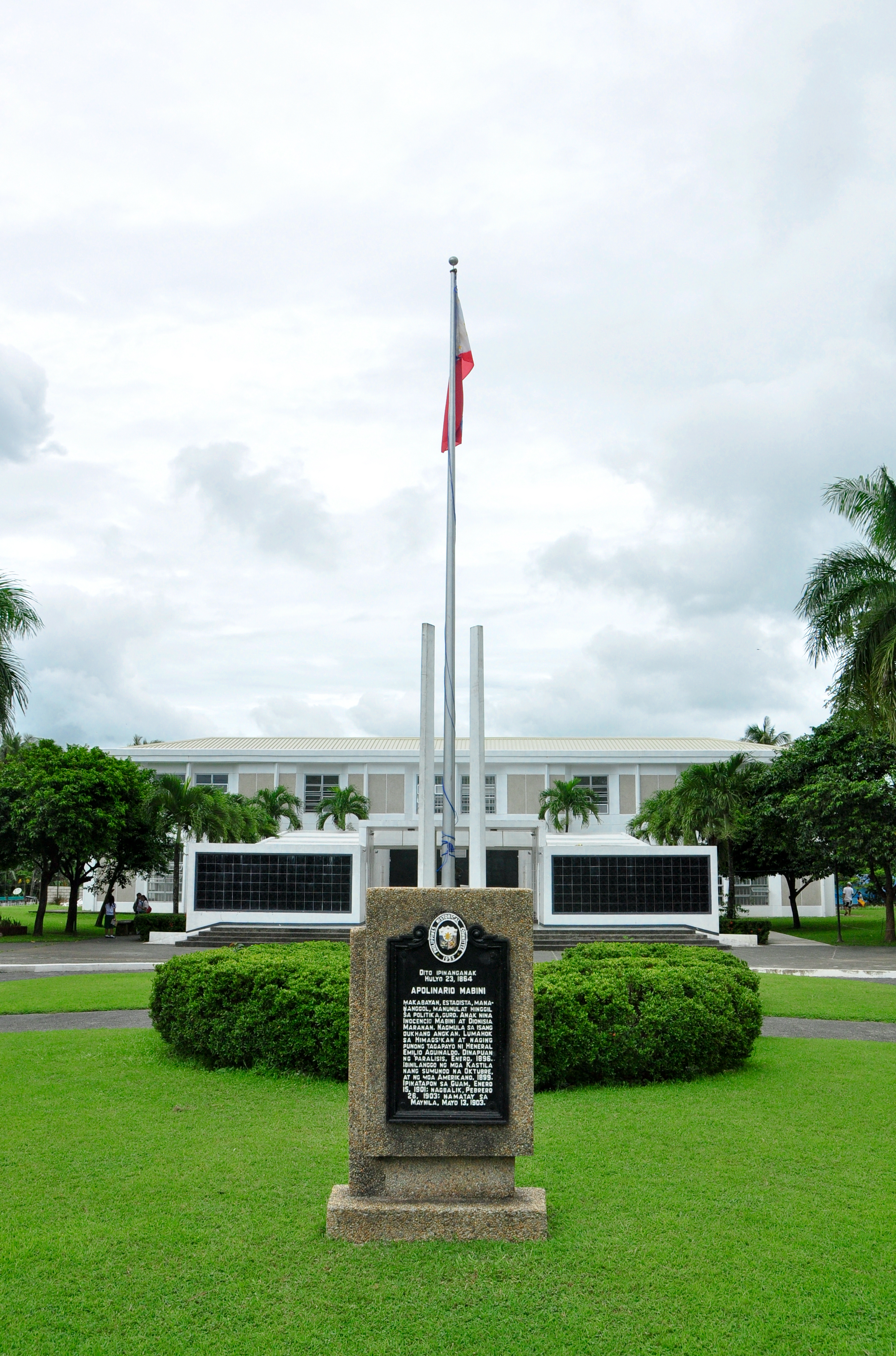
Apolinario Mabini Shrine in Tanauan, Batangas

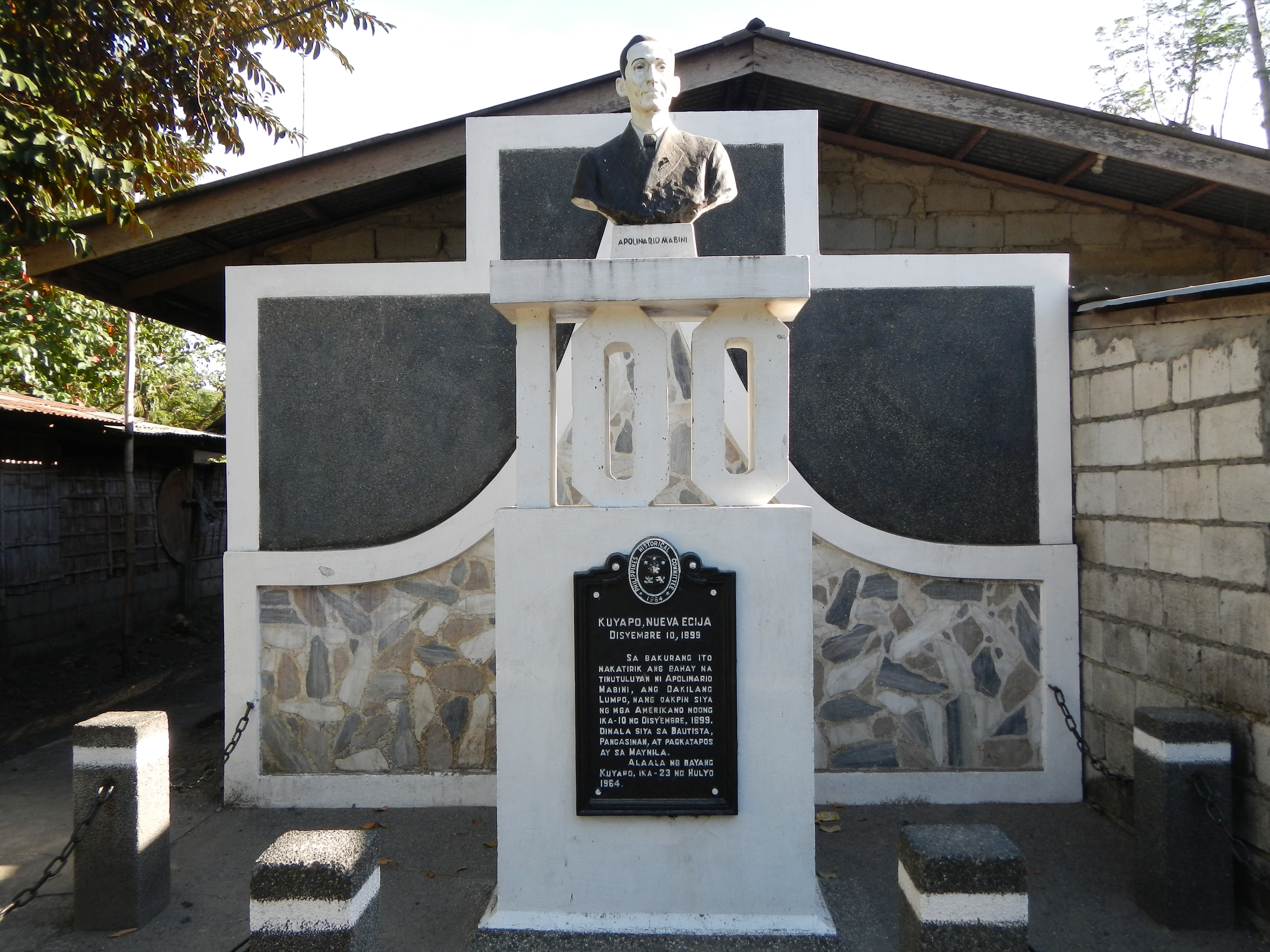
Apolinario Mabini Memorial (Cuyapo, Nueva Ecija)

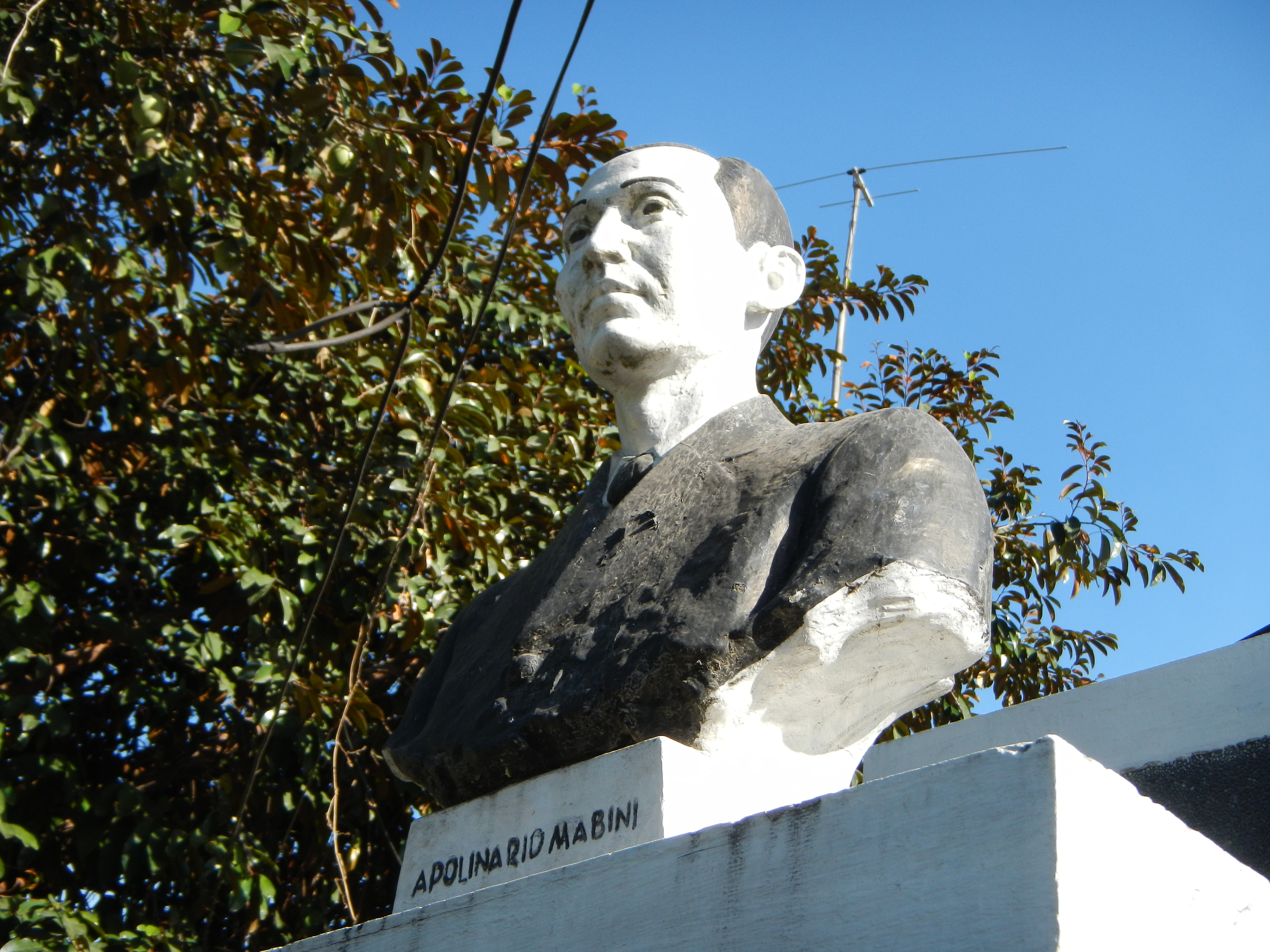
Bust

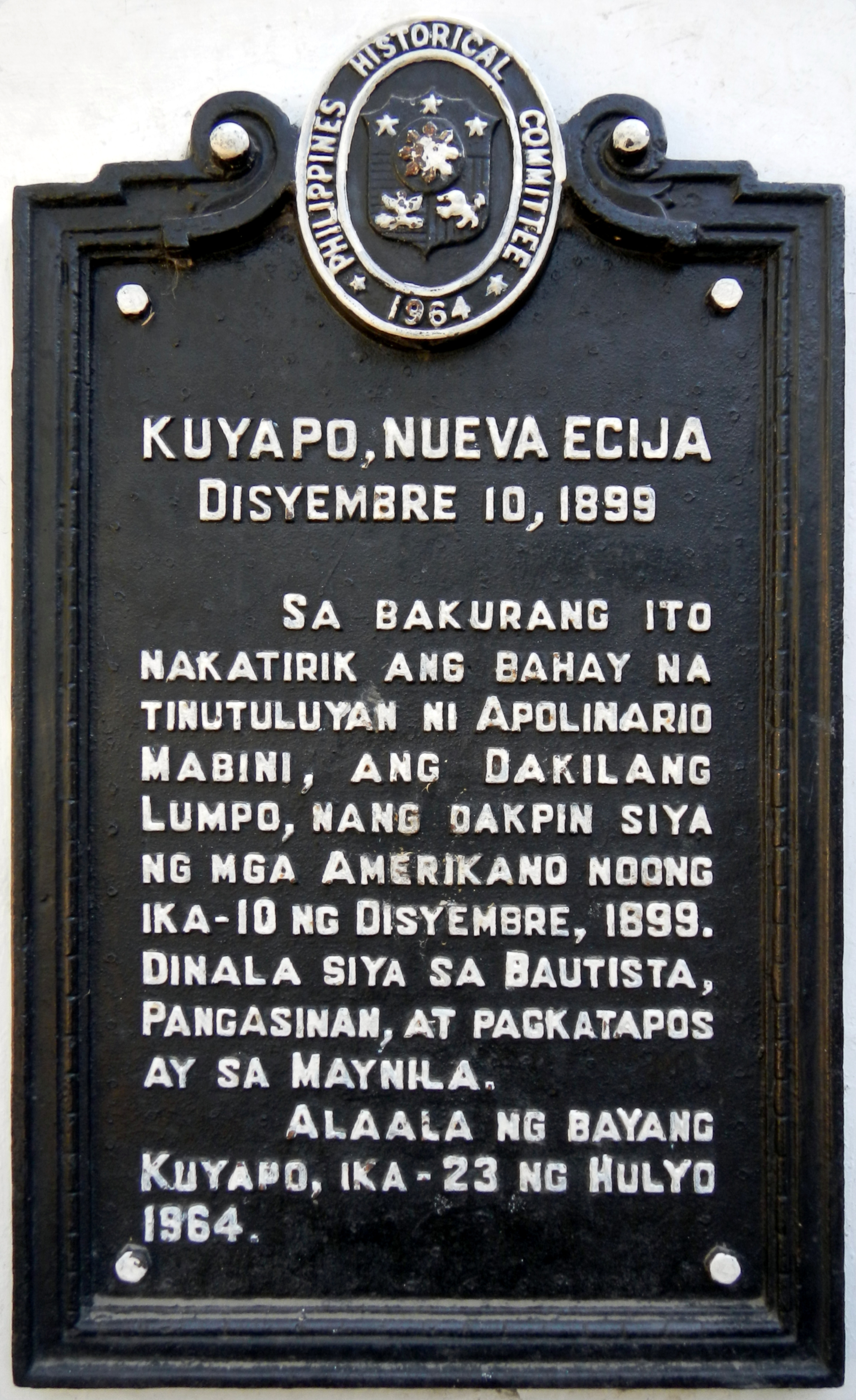
Historical marker

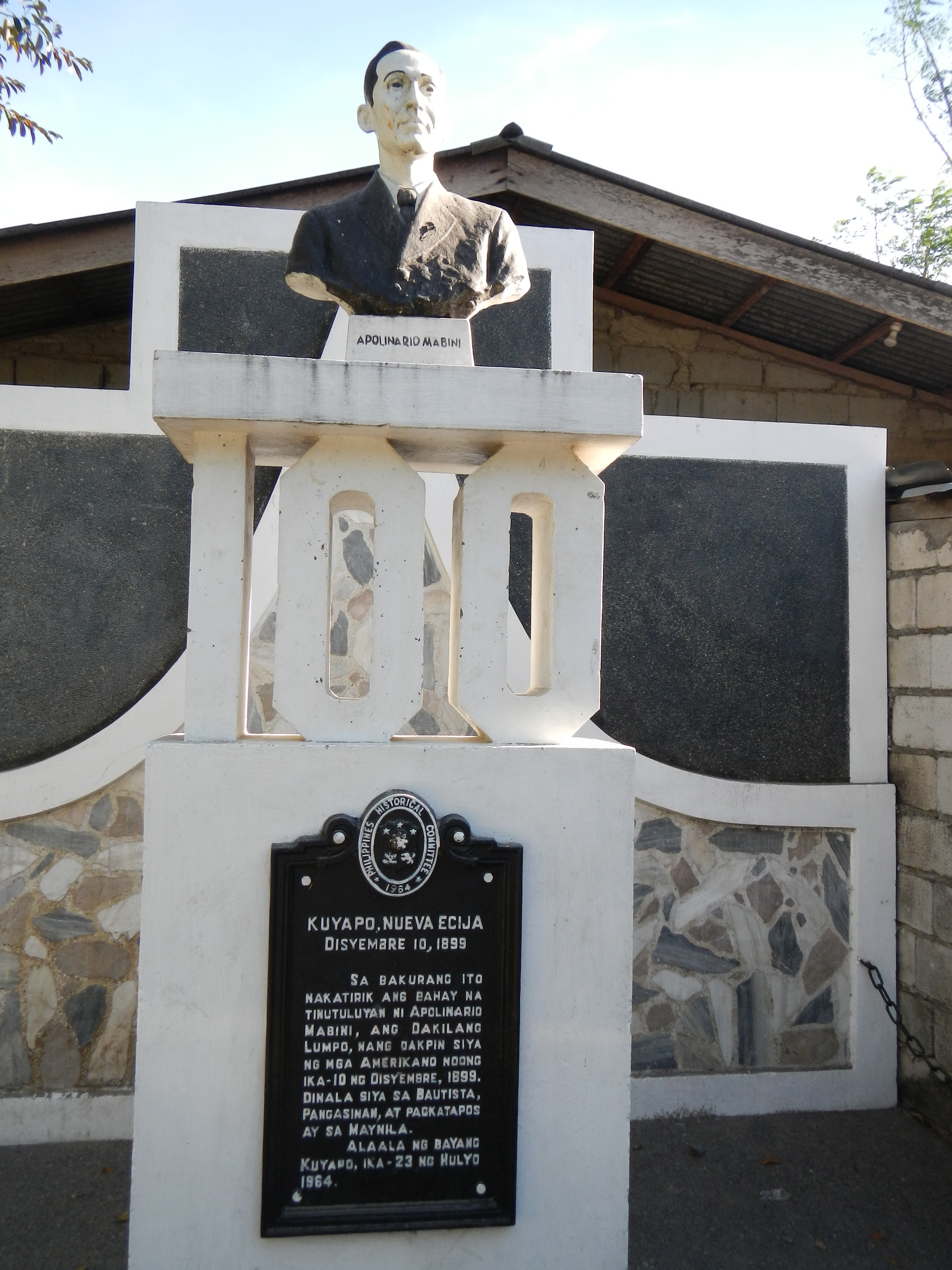
The Memorial

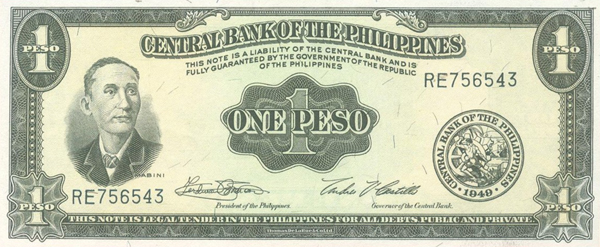
English series P1 Note Portrait of Mabini

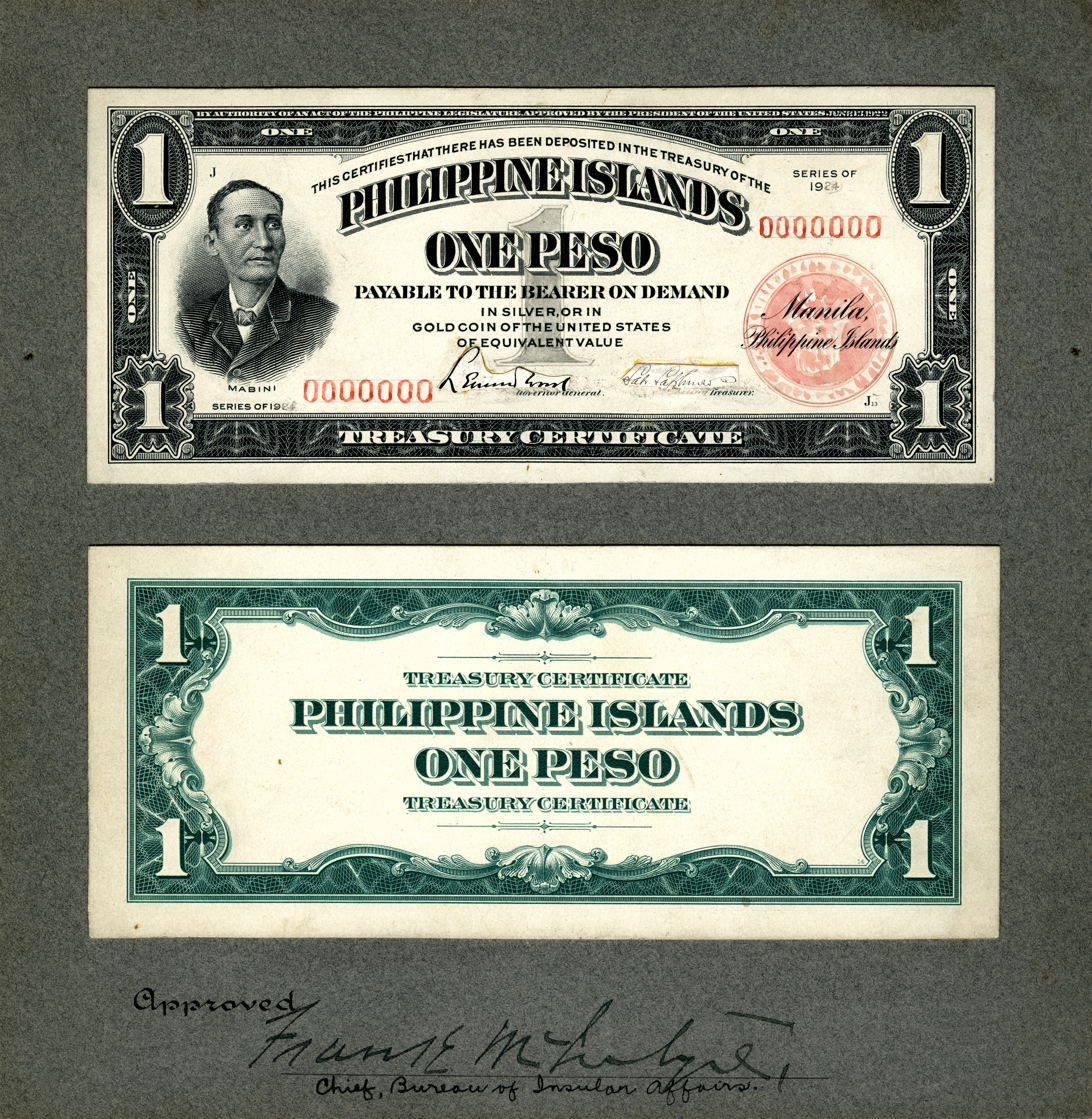
One peso treasury certificate

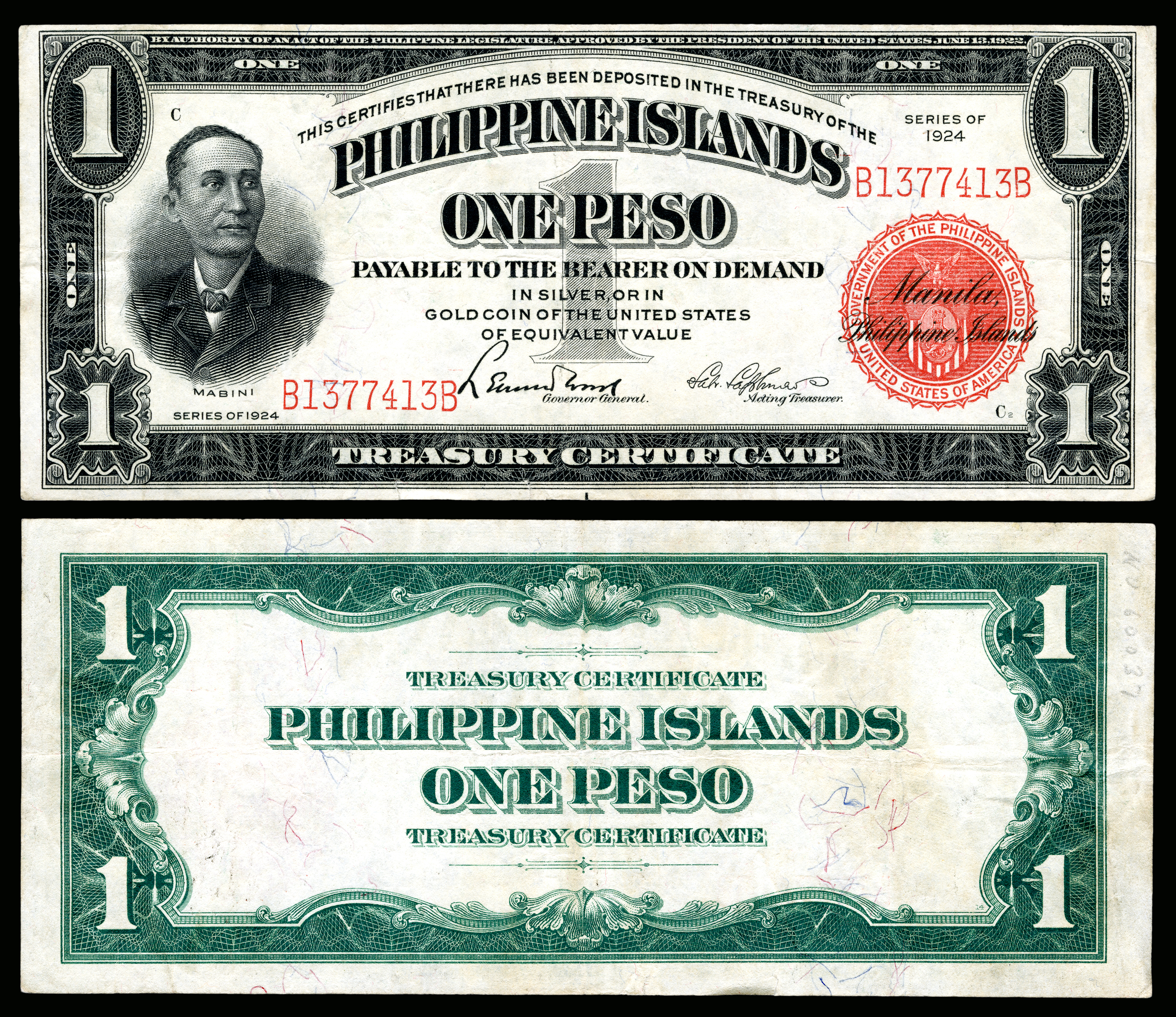
One peso issued note

Political offices
New office	Prime Minister of the Philippines; 1899	Succeeded by Pedro Paterno
New office	Minister of Foreign Relations; 1899	Succeeded by Felipe Buencamino
