= Mabini Shrine (Batangas) =

Memorial shrine in Tanauan, Philippines

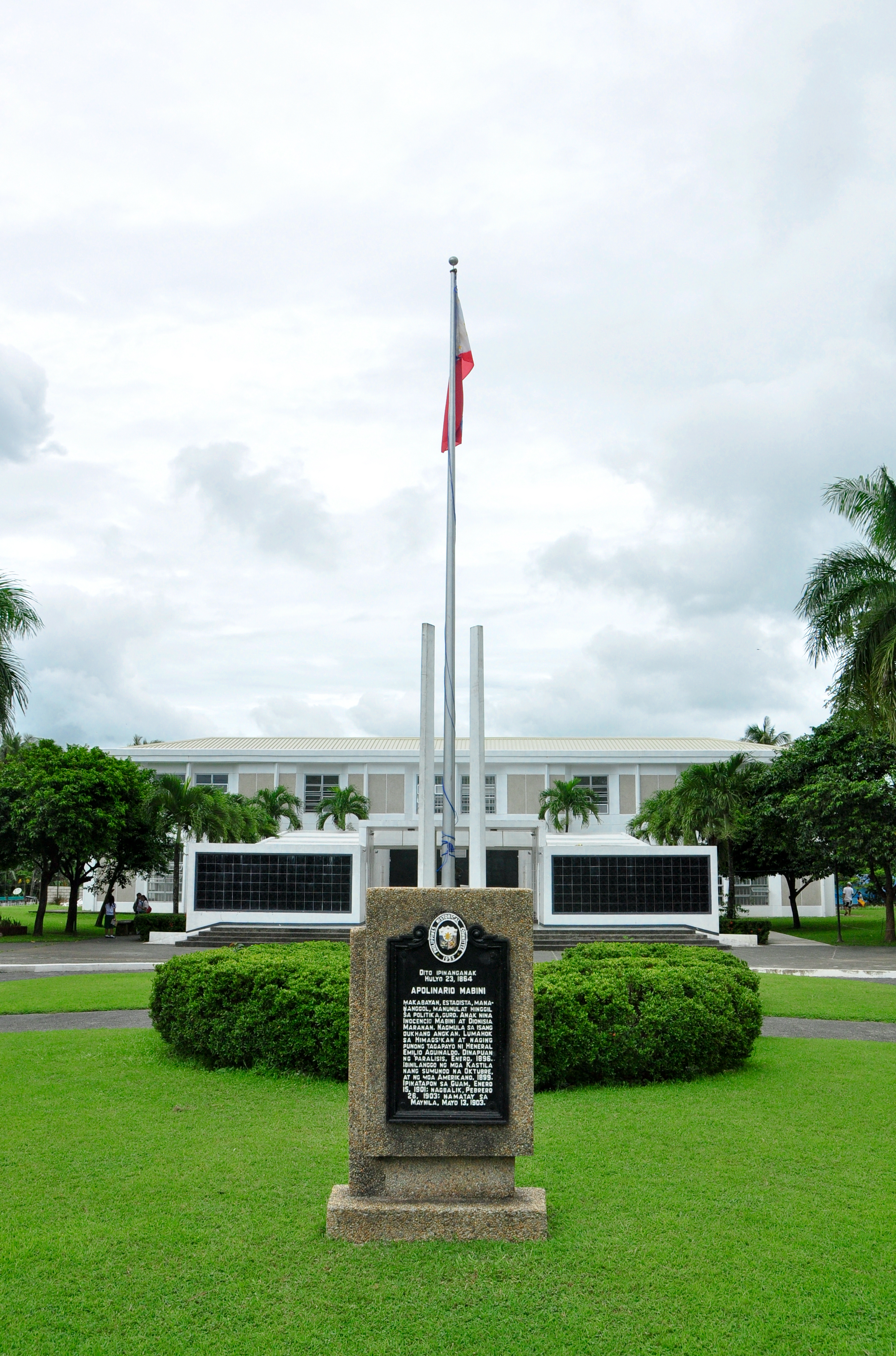
- Interactive map of Mabini Shrine
- Type: Shrine
- Location: Tanauan, Batangas, Philippines
- Coordinates: 14°06′04″N 121°05′57″E
- Designated: 1949
- Designer: Juan Nakpil

Mabini Shrine is a memorial shrine in Tanauan, Batangas, Philippines. The shrine is dedicated to Apolinario Mabini (1864–1903). He was a Filipino revolutionary leader and statesman who served as foreign minister and adviser to Emilio Aguinaldo, the first Philippine president. The shrine is also the place where Mabini was born.

== History ==
Mabini Shrine is a memorial shrine in Tanauan, Batangas dedicated to Apolinario Mabini. It was designed by Juan Nakpil, one of the National Artists for architecture in the Philippines.

The shrine hosts a historical marker that the Philippines Historical Committee, now the National Historical Commission of the Philippines (NHCP), installed in 1939 to denote the place where Mabini was born. A replica of the hut where Mabini was born can be seen in the shrine.

In addition, the shrine has a museum built in 1956, which the NHCP renovated in 2014. The museum's facilities now include an audio-visual room, a stereoscopy room, push-button exhibits, and a hologram display of Mabini.

== Gallery ==
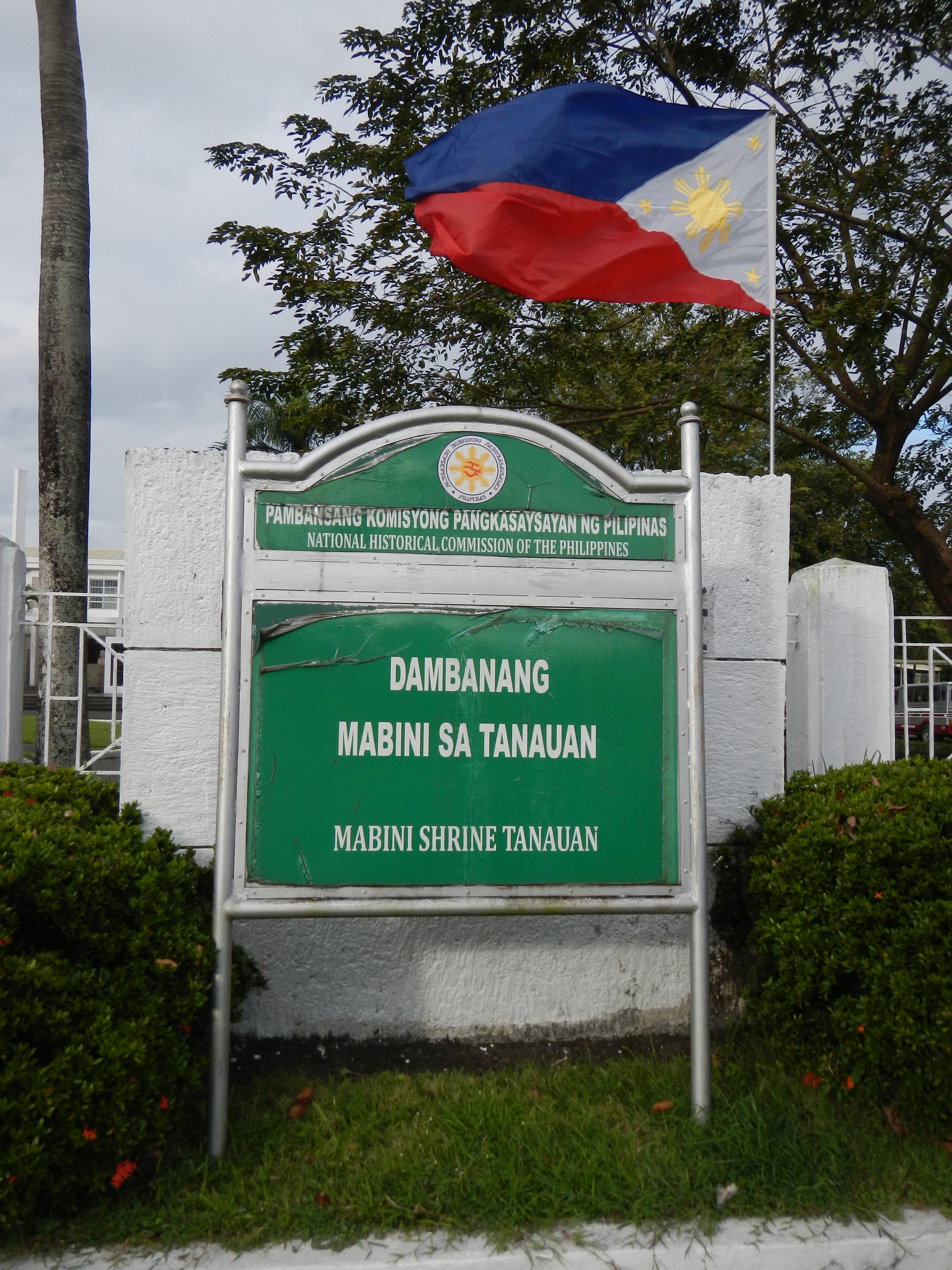
Signage

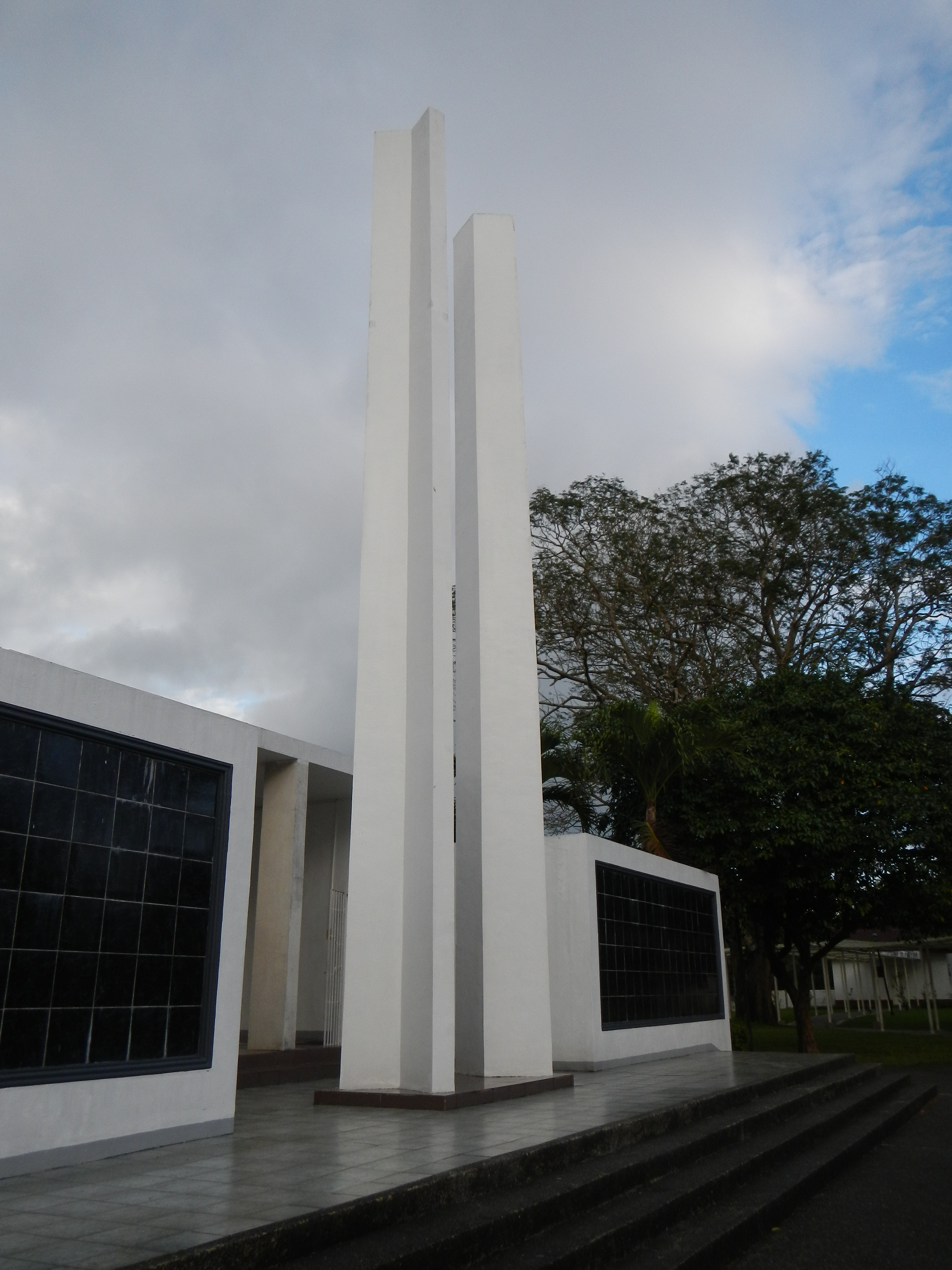
Shrine

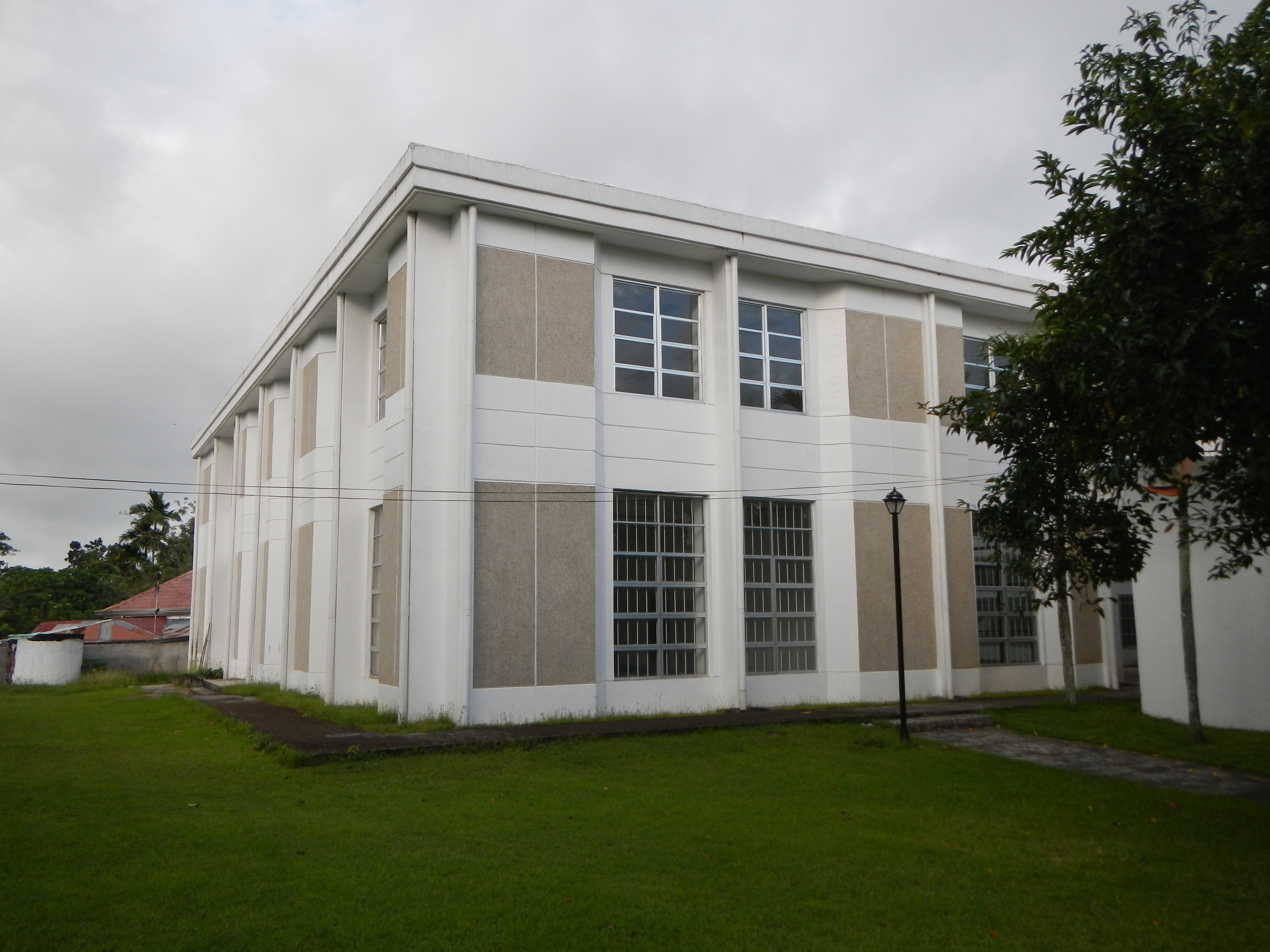
Museum

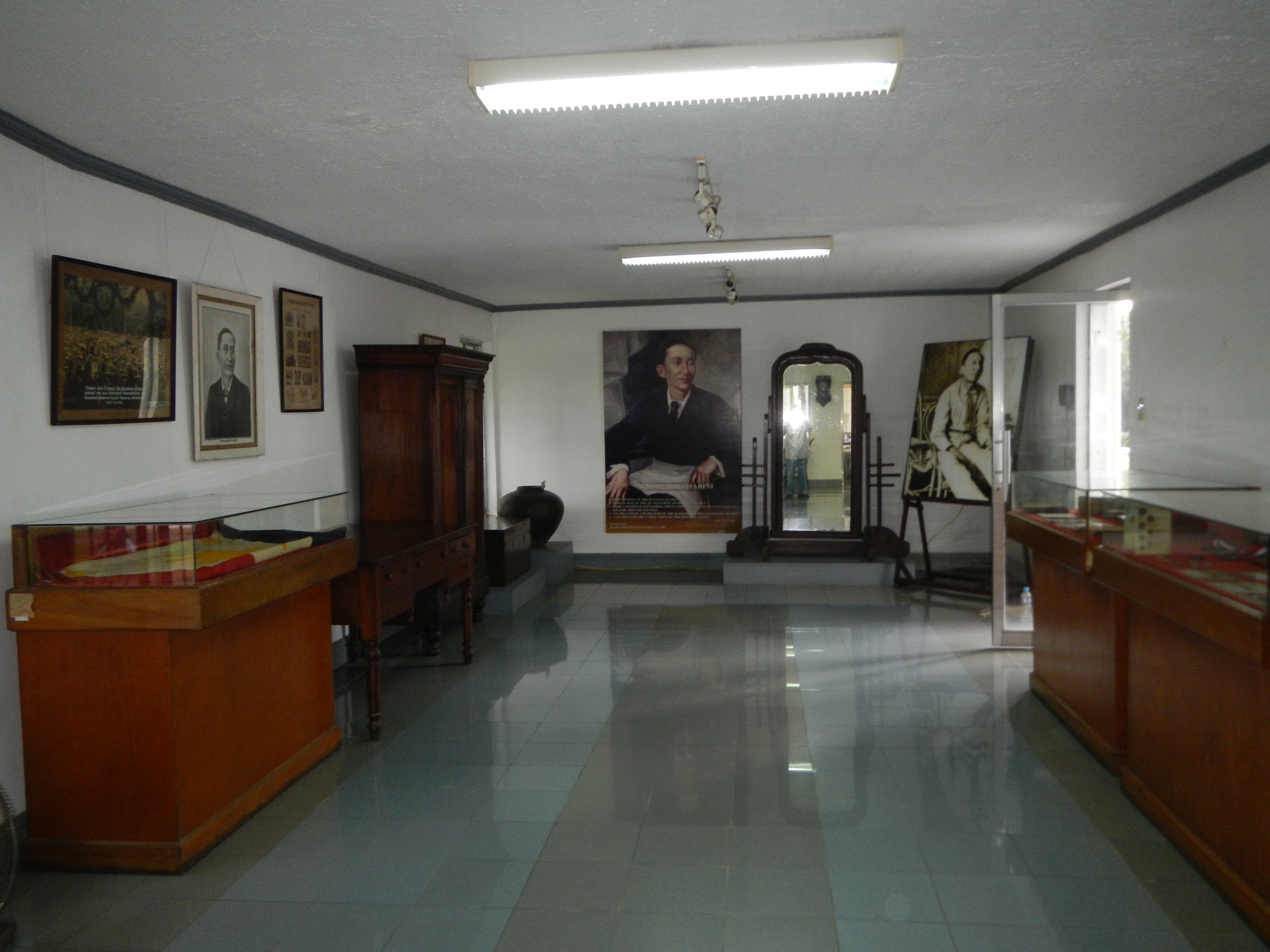
Exhibit

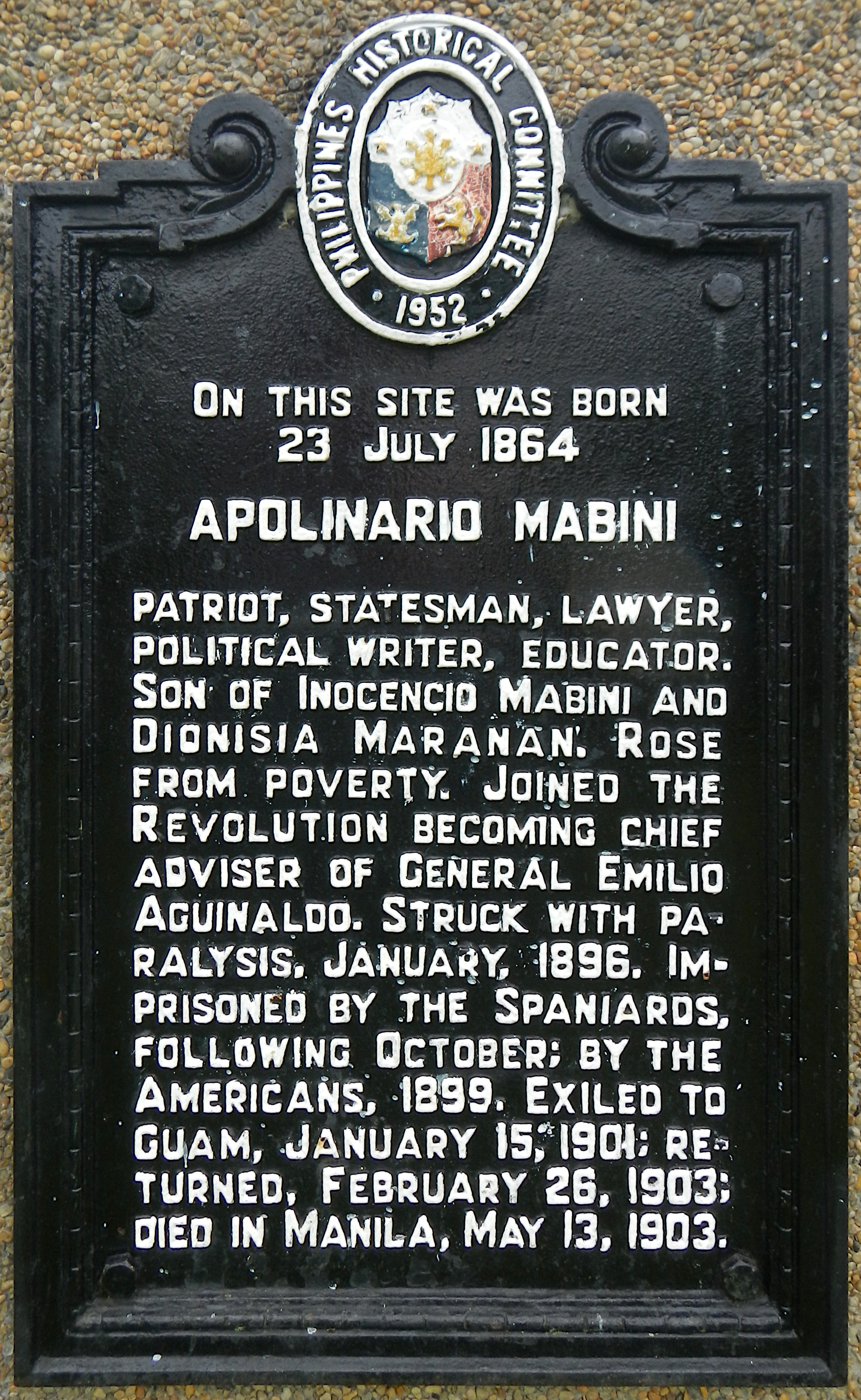
PHC marker

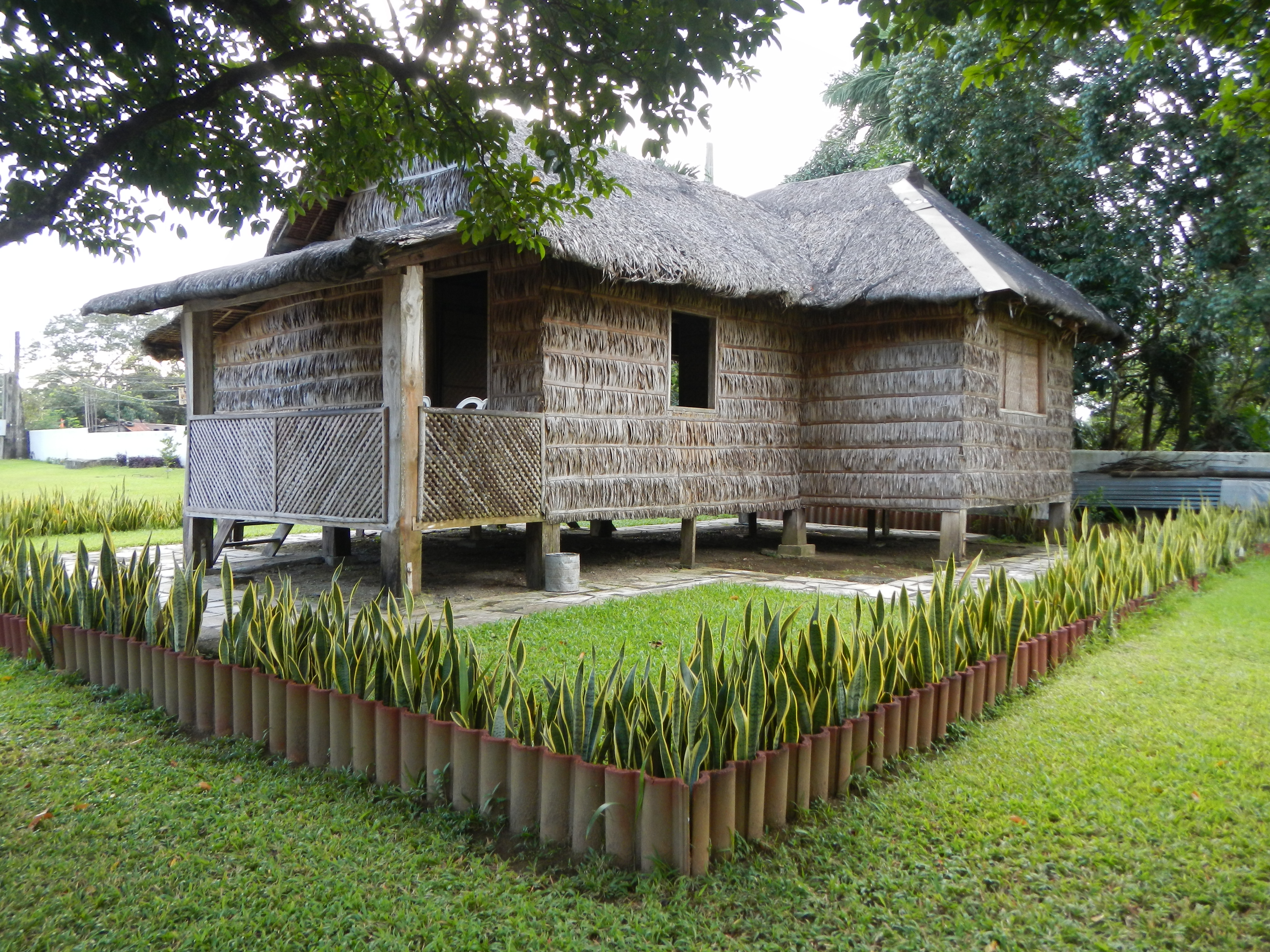
Replica of Mabini's birthplace
