= Mabini Shrine (Manila) =

Historic shrine in Manila, Philippines

- Dambanang Mabini (Filipino)
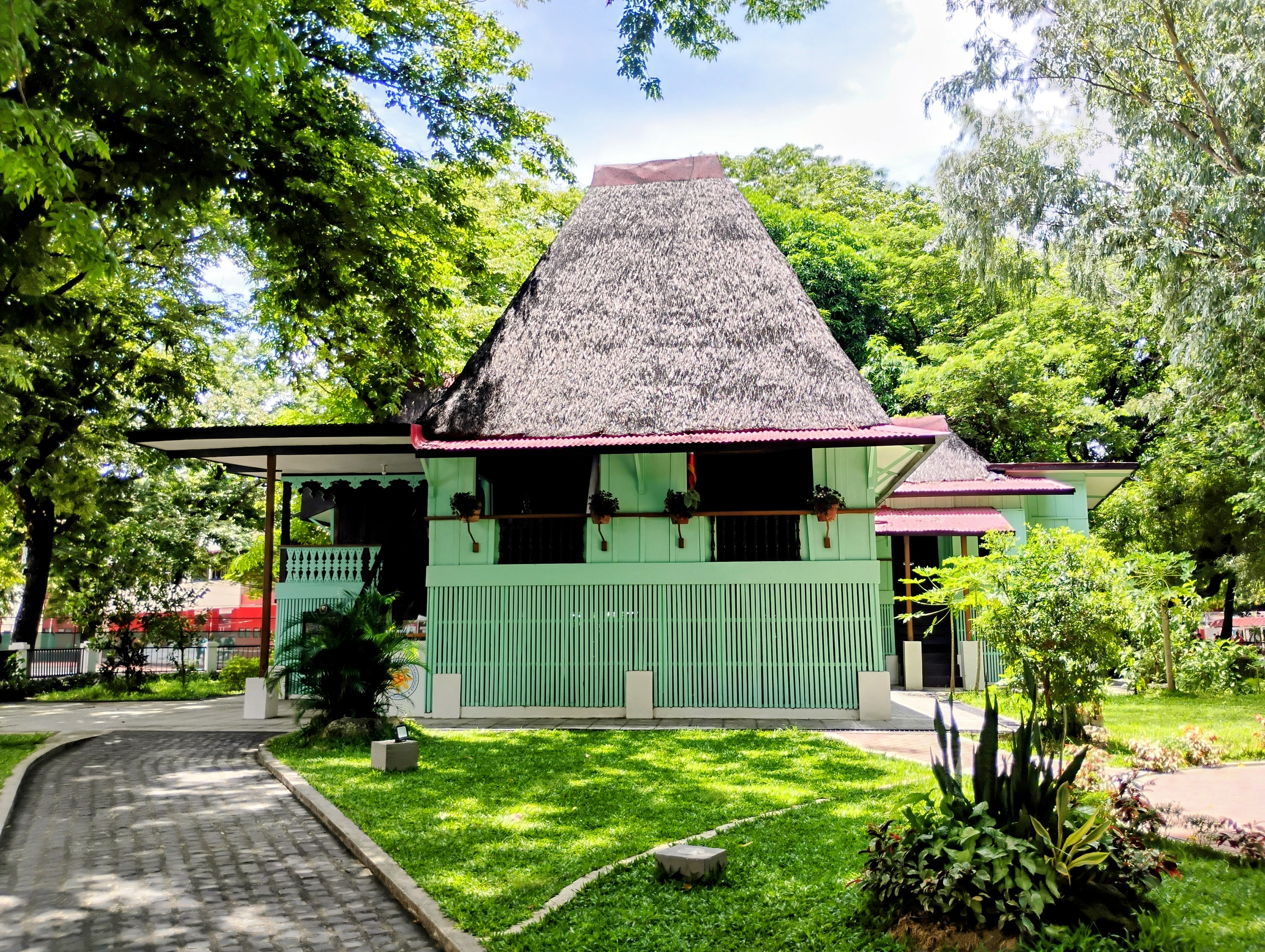
- Interactive map of the Mabini Shrine area

General information
- Status: Completed
- Location: Polytechnic University of the Philippines A. Mabini Campus, Santa Mesa, Manila, Philippines
- Coordinates: 14°35′52″N 121°00′40″E
- Current tenants: Museo ni Apolinario Mabini
- Named for: Apolinario Mabini
- Relocated: 1930s (23 Calle Nagtahan); 1960 (Malacañang Park); 2010 (PUP campus)

Technical details
- Material: Bamboo, nipa

Renovating team
- Architect: Juan Nakpil (1960s)

The Apolinario Mabini Shrine (Filipino: Dambanang Apolinario Mabini) is a historic site in Santa Mesa, Manila, Philippines. It is noted for being the residence of Filipino military leader Apolinario Mabini who figured in the Philippine Revolution. Originally situated on Nagtahan along the Pasig River, the structure was moved to the Polytechnic University of the Philippines main campus in Santa Mesa in the mid-2000s.

== History ==
=== As the house of Mabini ===
The bamboo-and-nipa house which would later become known as the Mabini Shrine was owned by Cecilio del Rosario and Máxima Castañeda. The del Rosarios became related by affinity to Apolinario Mabini, a significant figure of the Philippine Revolution, after Mabini's younger brother Agapito married a woman in the del Rosario family. The original address of the house was 21 Calle Nagtahan, on the northern bank of the Pasig River. Apolinario Mabini first lived in this house in 1888, the year he entered law school at the University of Santo Tomas. He continued to live there through most of his adulthood. On May 13, 1903, Mabini died of cholera in this house, shortly after his return from exile in Guam.

=== Relocation ===
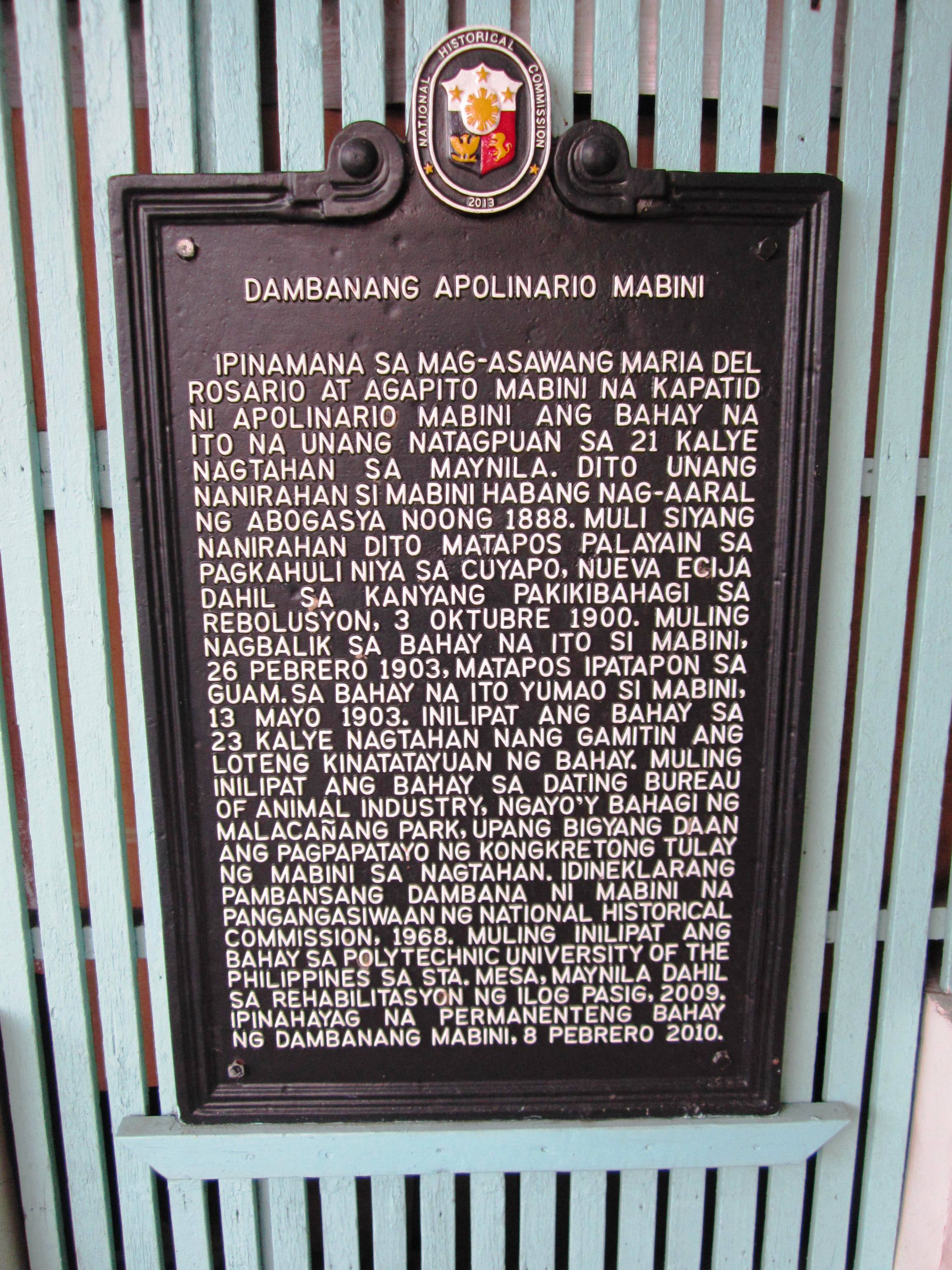
Historical marker in Tagalog

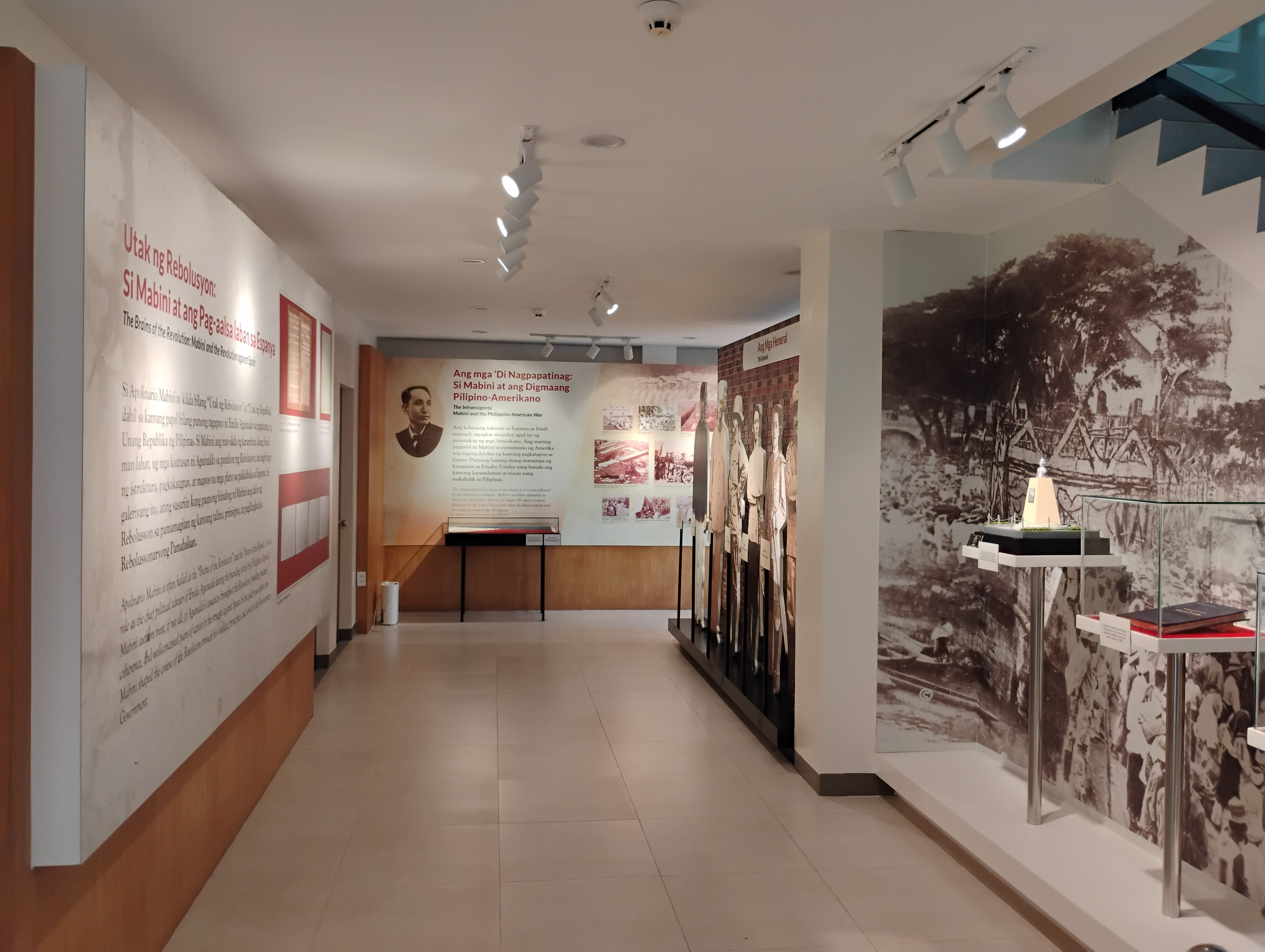
Museum interior

The house was moved in the 1930s to an adjacent site at 23 Calle Nagtahan, which was acquired by the government, to make way for the construction of Nagtahan Bridge (now Mabini Bridge).

It was moved once again in 1960, this time to the south bank of the Pasig River within the Bureau of Animal Industry compound (now Presidential Security Group Compound in Malacañang Park) to give way for the widening of Nagtahan Bridge. It was then restored under the supervision of National Artist for Architecture, Juan Nakpil. In 1968, the house was declared as a national shrine under the administration of National Historical Commission of the Philippines, pursuant to Proclamation No. 324 signed by President Ferdinand Marcos. In April 2007, the Metropolitan Manila Development Authority proposed that the Mabini Shrine be relocated to another site, as part of a project to widen the Pasig River. Dante G. Guevarra, President of the Polytechnic University of the Philippines (PUP), proposed in 2007 to have the house moved inside the main campus of his university, which is upstream of the bridge on the north bank of the Pasig River. PUP allocated 905-square-meter (9,740 sq ft) of land for the shrine and officially renamed its campus as the PUP Mabini Campus. There was a proposal to move the house inside the Arroceros Park, a plan which had the support of Manila Mayor Alfredo Lim.

On February 8, 2010, President Gloria Macapagal Arroyo issued Proclamation No. 1992 declaring the PUP Mabini Campus in Santa Mesa as a permanent home for the Mabini Shrine. This is to prevent another relocation that "may further diminish its historical and architectural authenticity and sanctity as a National Shrine". A yearlong project was undertaken in 2013 to restore the house and its surrounding grounds.

The structure now hosts the Museo ni Mabini (transl. Mabini's Museum) featuring objects once owned by Apolinario Mabini and other memorabilia.
