= The Mabini Academy =

Private school in Batangas, Philippines

Location
- T.M. Kalaw Street, Barangay Balintawak; Lipa, Batangas; Philippines
- Coordinates: 13°56′55″N 121°09′36″E

Information
- Type: Private
- Established: June 10, 1922
- Principal: Mrs. Abegail H. Vergara
- Enrollment: over 3,000

The Mabini Academy is a school in Lipa City, Batangas and was founded as a non-stock, non-profit corporation on June 10, 1922 by Professor Randall A. Rowley, Dean Francisco Benitez, Mrs. Paz M. Benitez, Dr. Jose M. Katigbak, Mrs. Tarcila M. Katigbak, and Miss Emilia Malabanan.

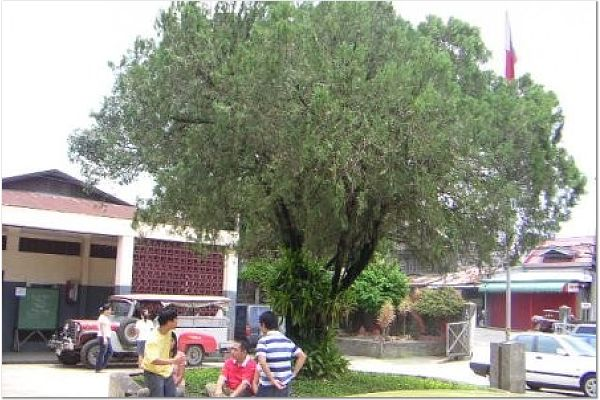
Batibot at the main entrance

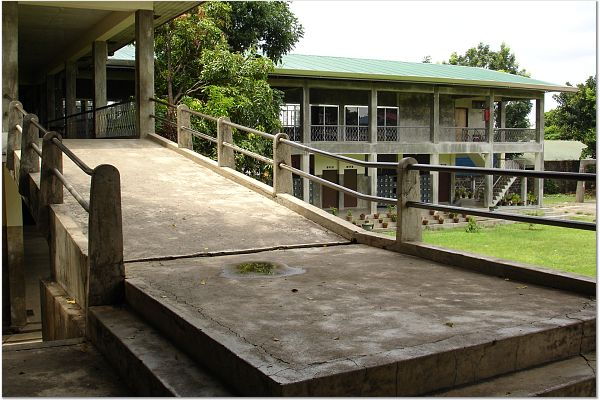
Stairs leading to second floor at the back

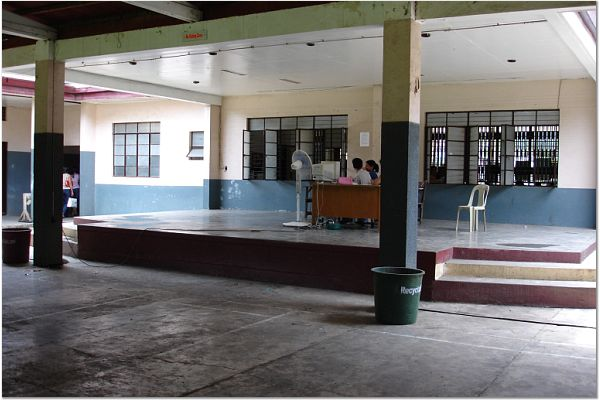
Close Stage (Multi-Purpose Hall)

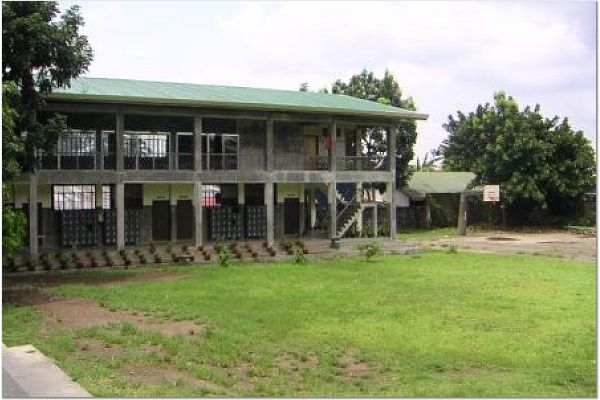
New Science Building

== History ==
The Mabini Academy opened on June 12, 1922 with an enrolment of more than one hundred students, two first year classes and one second year class. In June, 1923, a third year class was added, and in June, 1924, the complete high school course was given. On March 25, 1925, it received government recognition. It continued functioning as a secondary school, giving the complete general course (day) until December 9, 1941, when all schools closed because of the Second World War. It remained closed during the Japanese occupation. It reopened in June, 1945 and has been functioning ever since.

Before the war, the school occupied a large three-storey building with a library and laboratories. That building was burned, the apparatus and library was looted and burned during the war. By March, 1947, the library had been replenished and the laboratories equipped. In that same year the school transferred to its present site.

The site has been enlarged by buying adjoining lots. Its present area is 25, 610 square meters – one of the largest school sites among private schools in Batangas. On this site, the Academy has seven buildings, a basketball court, and an open stage. In 1948 a Junior College with Liberal Arts and Normal Courses was added together with a complete elementary department. The College Department, however, was short-lived, closing in 1961.

1963 saw the start of the improvement in the buildings. The administration building was the first to be demolished and replaced by a modern concrete edifice. In 1964, the two wings of this building, housing eight classrooms, were constructed. This was followed by the remodeling of the grandstand in 1965, by the construction of the first wing of the two-storey Science Building in 1966, by the construction of a 3-room Vocational Building in 1967, and by the erection of a semi-concrete fence along the southern boundary of the school. In 1971, the two-storey Science Building was completed. In 1982 enrollment in the high school reached 3,100.

Prior to the establishment of this school, Lipa students went to Batangas or to Manila for their secondary education. This was expensive for the parents. The schools establishment, therefore, was a great financial help to them. For many years, it was the only secondary school in Lipa City and the neighboring towns.

== Notable alumni ==
- Poet & Writer, Romalyn Ante
- Alberto Katigbak - former Ambassador to the Court of St. James (United Kingdom)
- Artemio Lobrin - 1971 Constitutional Convention delegate
- Dr. Jose R. Silva
- Porfirio Recio, Atty. Jose L. Africa,
- Eva R. Reyes - Miss Republic of the Philippines 1972
- Bienvenido Lumbera - National Artist for Literature
- Jose Lardizabal - playwright
- Lucas Garcia, Idol Philippines 2019 1st Runner up
- Domingo Altamirano - former Bureau of Plant Industry Region IV Director
- Former Mayor of Lipa City, Atty. Carlos Solis
- Vice-mayors Cesar Kison and Felino Magaling
- Former City Superintendent of Public Schools Isidoro Laygo,
- Former Municipal Judge Calixto Luna
- Former Assistant Treasurer Jose Estrella
- Former City Engineer Isidro Reyes
- Former Batangas Provincial Board Member Jacinto Castillo,
- Former Mayor Baldomero Reyes
- Humanitarian and Human Rights Icon, Jayson L. Laluna
- Educators Ramon L. Recio and Mother Agnes of the Good Shepherd Sisters (née Luz Katigbak),
- Newspapermen Arturo Dimayuga, Aristedes Africa, and Amado Macasaet
- Engineers Isabelo Tapia, Miguel Paala, Maximo Abaca, and Alfredo Roxas
- Businessmen Rodolfo Silva, Benedicto Katigbak, Jose K. Lirag (son of textile magnate Basilio L. Lirag), Alfredo Lipat Hospital owners and administrators Drs. Pedro Lasig, Amado Luz, Cesar Reyes, and Nemesio Villa, Jr.
- Edgardo Manguiat, founder and conductor, U.P. Singing Ambassadors
- Dennis Marasigan, theater/film/television director/writer/actor
- Manuel M. Lantin (1988), Alberto T. Barrion (1991), Ireneo L. Lit, Jr. (2000), Outstanding Young Scientist Awardees, National Academy of Science and Technology of the Philippines
