= National symbols of the Philippines =

The national symbols of the Philippines consist of symbols that represent Philippine traditions and ideals and convey the principles of sovereignty and national solidarity of the Filipino people. Some of these symbols namely the national flag, the Great Seal, the coat of arms and the national motto are stated in the Flag and Heraldic Code of the Philippines, which is also known as Republic Act 8491. In the Constitution of the Philippines, the Filipino language is stated as the national language of the Philippines. Aside from those stated symbols in the Constitution and in Republic Act 8491, there are only seven official national symbols of the Philippines enacted through law, namely sampaguita as national flower, waling-waling as national orchid, narra as national tree, the Philippine eagle as national bird, Philippine pearl as national gem, arnis as national martial art and sport and the Filipino Sign Language as the national sign language. Thus, there is a total of thirteen official national symbols passed through Philippine laws.

There are symbols such as the carabao (national animal), mango (national fruit) and anahaw (national leaf) that are widely known as national symbols but have no laws recognizing them as official national symbols. Even Jose Rizal, who is widely considered a national hero, has not been declared officially as a national hero in any existing Philippine law according to historical experts. However, in 2003, Benigno Aquino Jr. was officially declared by the President Gloria Macapagal Arroyo as a national hero by an executive order. A National Artist of the Philippines is a rank or a title given to a Filipino citizen in recognition to the recipient's contributions to Philippine arts and letters and they are not considered a national symbol that represents traditions and ideals.

Through the years, there were attempts to make those traditional symbols official. One of them is House Bill 3926, a bill proposed on February 17, 2014, by Bohol First District Representative Rene Relampagos of the Philippine House of Representatives that sought to declare, re-declare or recognize a number of national symbols. House Bill 3926 ("Philippine National Symbols Act of 2014"), aimed to encourage nationalism and unity; to guarantee respect, preservation and promotion of national symbols; and to correct the "unofficial" status of the symbols. Among the national symbols listed in the measure are Jose Rizal as the only historical Filipino to be recognized as national hero, adobo as the national food and jeepney as the national vehicle. It also includes the previous official national symbols, which were eleven during the filing of the bill. As of February 2014, the bill is still pending with the Committee on Revision Laws of the House of Representatives and is not yet a law that would make the proposed symbols as official national symbols.

== Development of the symbols ==
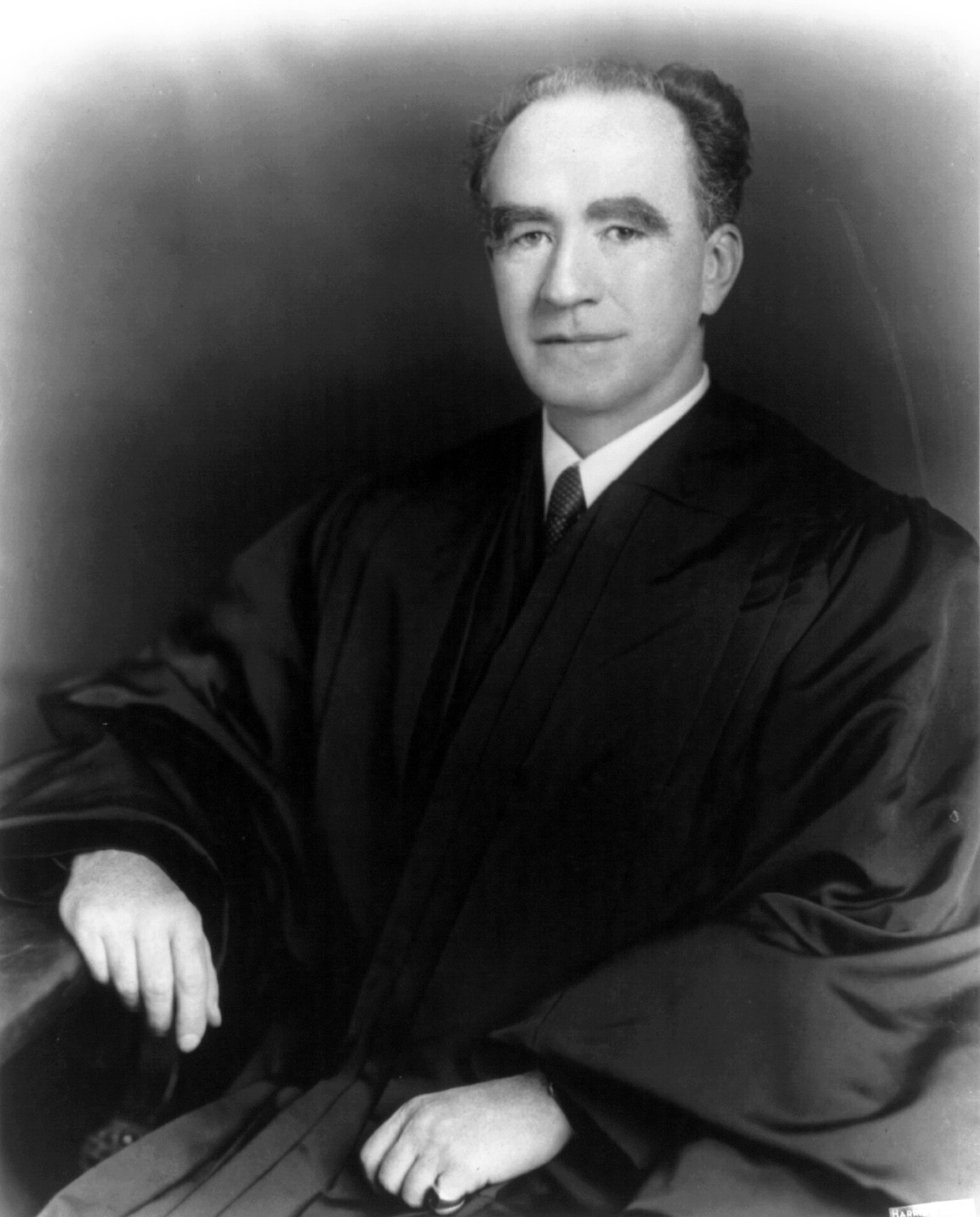
Governor-General Frank Murphy declared sampaguita and narra as national symbols during the Commonwealth era.

The Republic Act (RA) 8491, also known as Flag and Heraldic Code of the Philippines, stipulates the code for national flag, anthem, motto, coat-of-arms and other heraldic items and devices of the Philippines. According to Article XIV Section 6 of the Constitution of the Philippines, the national language of the Philippines is Filipino. Apart from RA 8491 and the Constitution, the Philippines has only six official national symbols enacted either through a proclamation by the executive department or through a Republic Act by the legislative department, namely sampaguita, narra, the Philippine eagle, the Philippine pearl, arnis and the Filipino Sign Language.

In 1934, during the Commonwealth era, Governor-General Frank Murphy declared sampaguita and narra as national flower and national tree, respectively, through Proclamation No. 652. Philippine President Fidel Ramos proclaimed the Philippine eagle as the national bird in 1995 through Proclamation No. 615. Ramos also declared the South Sea Pearl or Philippine Pearl as the national gem in 1996 through Proclamation No. 905. In 2009, President Gloria Macapagal Arroyo declared arnis as the national sport and martial art through Republic Act 9850. On October 30, 2018, President Rodrigo Duterte signed Republic Act No. 11106, a law declaring the Filipino Sign Language as the national sign language of the Filipino deaf and the official sign language of the Philippine government involving communications to the deaf.

=== Making a national symbol official ===
A Philippine national symbol will be considered official once it is declared through a law or a proclamation. National symbols such as the cariñosa, carabao, bangus (milkfish), and anahaw (footstool palm) that are circulating through various sources have no official status and have not established by law. According to Nestor Castro, a Filipino cultural anthropologist, most of these unofficial symbols were passed on as tradition in schools every start of the school year when students were asked to buy posters containing the supposed national symbols. While official national symbols are declared through law, Castro and National Historical Commission of the Philippines (NHCP) Section Chief Teodoro Atienza considered that the public must be consulted first before declaration of national symbol.

=== Pending and vetoed laws ===
Throughout the history of legislation in the Philippines, attempts were made to expand the list of official national symbols. In February 2013, the Philippine Senate passed a bill declaring waling-waling (Vanda sanderiana) as the national flower alongside sampaguita. A similar bill in the House of Representatives had already been passed in 2012. Normally, the bill would become law after being signed by the President. However, it was vetoed by President Benigno Aquino III. The veto did not grant the waling-waling as the second national flower due to the confusion that it would create.

A year later, on February 17, 2014, Representative Rene Relampagos, a congressman from the First District of Bohol, introduced a legislation in the Philippine House of Representatives that sought to declare, re-declare or recognize a number of national symbols. House Bill 3926 or the "Philippine National Symbols Act of 2014" aimed to encourage nationalism and unity; to guarantee respect, preservation and promotion of national symbols; and to correct the "unofficial" status of the symbols. It listed 26 symbols including the previous eleven official national symbols. The bill is not yet a law that would make those symbols official because it is still pending with the House of Representatives' Committee on Revision Laws as of February 2014.

In February 2016, the House of Representatives approved on final reading of House Bill 6366, which declared the ancient boat balangay as the national boat of the Philippines. In April 2018, the House Committee on Basic Education and Culture approved House Bill 1022, seeking to declare baybayin, a pre-Hispanic writing system used in the Philippines, as the country's national writing system. As of 2019, both legislation are still unresolved as Senate concurrence and a presidential signature is pending.

=== Filipinos as national symbol ===
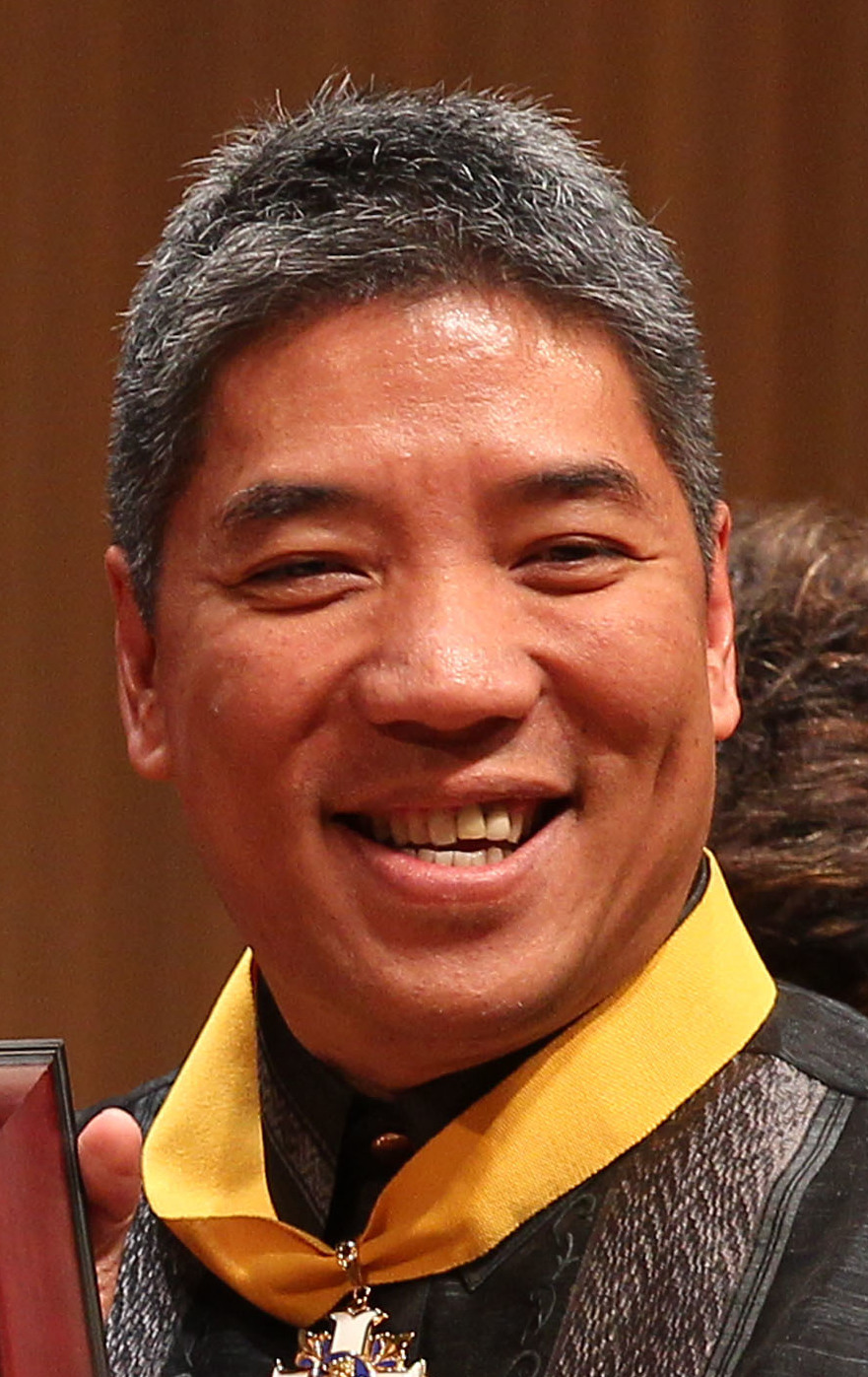
According to Ambeth Ocampo, no historical Filipino personage has been declared officially as being a National Hero through law.

According to the NHCP Section Chief Teodoro Atienza, and Filipino historian Ambeth Ocampo, there is no Filipino historical figure officially declared national hero through law or executive order. Although, there were laws and proclamations honoring Filipino heroes. In the Rizal Law principally sponsored by Claro M. Recto and enacted in 1956, Jose Rizal is mentioned as a national hero in the "whereas" clause of the law. Although, "whereas" clauses function as a preamble or introduction and it is not part of the provisions. On November 15, 1995, the Technical Committee of the National Heroes Committee, created through Executive Order No. 5 by former President Fidel Ramos, recommended nine Filipino historical figures to be National Heroes: Jose Rizal, Andres Bonifacio, Emilio Aguinaldo, Apolinario Mabini, Marcelo H. del Pilar, Sultan Dipatuan Kudarat, Juan Luna, Melchora Aquino, and Gabriela Silang. No action has been taken for these recommended National Heroes until it was revisited in one of the proceedings of the 14th Congress in 2009.

On August 3, 2009, shortly after the death of former President Corazon Aquino, widow of Benigno Aquino Jr., legislative measures have been filed calling for her official recognition as a national hero. Congresswoman Liwayway Vinzons-Chato filed a house resolution declaring Corazon Aquino a national hero. Although, a week after she filed the resolution, she realized that there is no Filipino historical figure declared through law. On August 10, 2009, she cited on her privilege speech in Congress the nine Filipino heroes recommended by National Heroes Committee in 1995. She then urge Congress to sign the resolutions declaring the nine Filipinos recommended by the National Heroes Committee plus Benigno Aquino Jr. and Corazon Aquino as national heroes. Congressman Salvador Escudero interpellated Vinzons-Chato's speech and stated that heroes are made in the hearts and minds of people and not through legislation. After the interpellation, it was moved by House of Representatives to refer the privilege speech of Vinzons-Chato to the Committee of Basic Education and Culture.

In 2013, Bayan Muna Congressmen Neri Colmenares and Carlos Isagani Zarate filed House Bill 3431 aiming to declare Andres Bonifacio as National Hero due to his actual participation in the Philippine Revolution against Spain. Another measure filed by Congressman Rene Relampagos from Bohol in February 2014 sought to declare Jose Rizal as the sole Filipino national hero. According to the bill, he was a nationalist and well known for his Philippine reforms advocacy during the Spanish colonial era.

Filipinos awarded with the rank or title National Artist of the Philippines are not considered to be national symbols because the title is given in recognition to the recipient's contributions to Philippine arts and letters and not as a symbol that represents traditions and ideals and convey the principles of sovereignty and national solidarity.

Despite declarations from historical experts that there is no historical person declared as a national hero, in 2003, an executive order by then-President Gloria Macapagal Arroyo officially declared Benigno Aquino Jr. as one of the national heroes, according to a news report by The Philippine Star. The news report did not specify which executive order was declared by Arroyo. The recognition of Rizal and Bonifacio as national heroes is implied by laws declaring their heroism, according to the NHCP.

== List of official national symbols ==
Here is the list of official national symbols recognized with legal foundation.

Type	Symbol	Depiction	Adopted	Legal basis
Declared by the 1987 Constitution and Republic Act No. 8491
National language	Filipino	—N/a	February 11, 1987	Article XIV, Sec. 6 of the 1987 Constitution
National flag	Flag of the Philippines	National flag	June 12, 1898 (Reaffirmed February 12, 1998)	Proclamation of President Emilio Aguinaldo; Reaffirmed by Republic Act No. 8491, Chapter I
National anthem	Lupang Hinirang	Lupang Hinirang (Chosen Land)	Music : June 12, 1898; Lyrics : May 26, 1958 (Reaffirmed February 12, 1998)	Music : Proclamation of President Emilio Aguinaldo; Lyrics : Department of Education Administrative Order; Reaffirmed by Republic Act No. 8491, Chapter II
National motto	National motto of the Philippines	"Maka-Diyos, Maka-tao, Makakalikasan at Makabansa" ("For God, People, Nature, and Country")	February 12, 1998	Republic Act No. 8491, Chapter III
Coat of arms	Coat of arms of the Philippines	Coat of arms of the Philippines	July 3, 1946 (Reaffirmed February 12, 1998)	Commonwealth Act No. 731; Reaffirmed by Republic Act No. 8491, Chapter IV^{[Note 1]}
Great seal	Great Seal of the Philippines	Great Seal	February 12, 1998	Republic Act No. 8491, Chapter V
Declared by Proclamations and other Republic Acts
National flower	Sampaguita (Jasminum sambac)		February 1, 1934	Executive Proclamation No. 652, issued by Governor General Frank Murphy
National tree	Narra (Pterocarpus indicus)		February 1, 1934	Executive Proclamation No. 652
National bird	Philippine eagle (Pithecophaga jefferyi)		July 4, 1995	Proclamation No. 615
National gem	Philippine pearl (Pinctada maxima)		October 15, 1996	Proclamation No. 905
National martial art and sport	Arnis (Eskrima/Kali)		December 11, 2009	Republic Act No. 9850
National sign language	Filipino Sign Language		October 30, 2018	Republic Act No. 11106
National orchid	Waling-waling (Vanda sanderiana)		June 7, 2016	Senate Bill 2092

== List of symbols with no official status ==
Here are the lists of symbols with no official status, or legal basis.

=== From pending, and failed proposals ===
According to NHCP, Rizal and Bonifacio are considered implied national heroes.

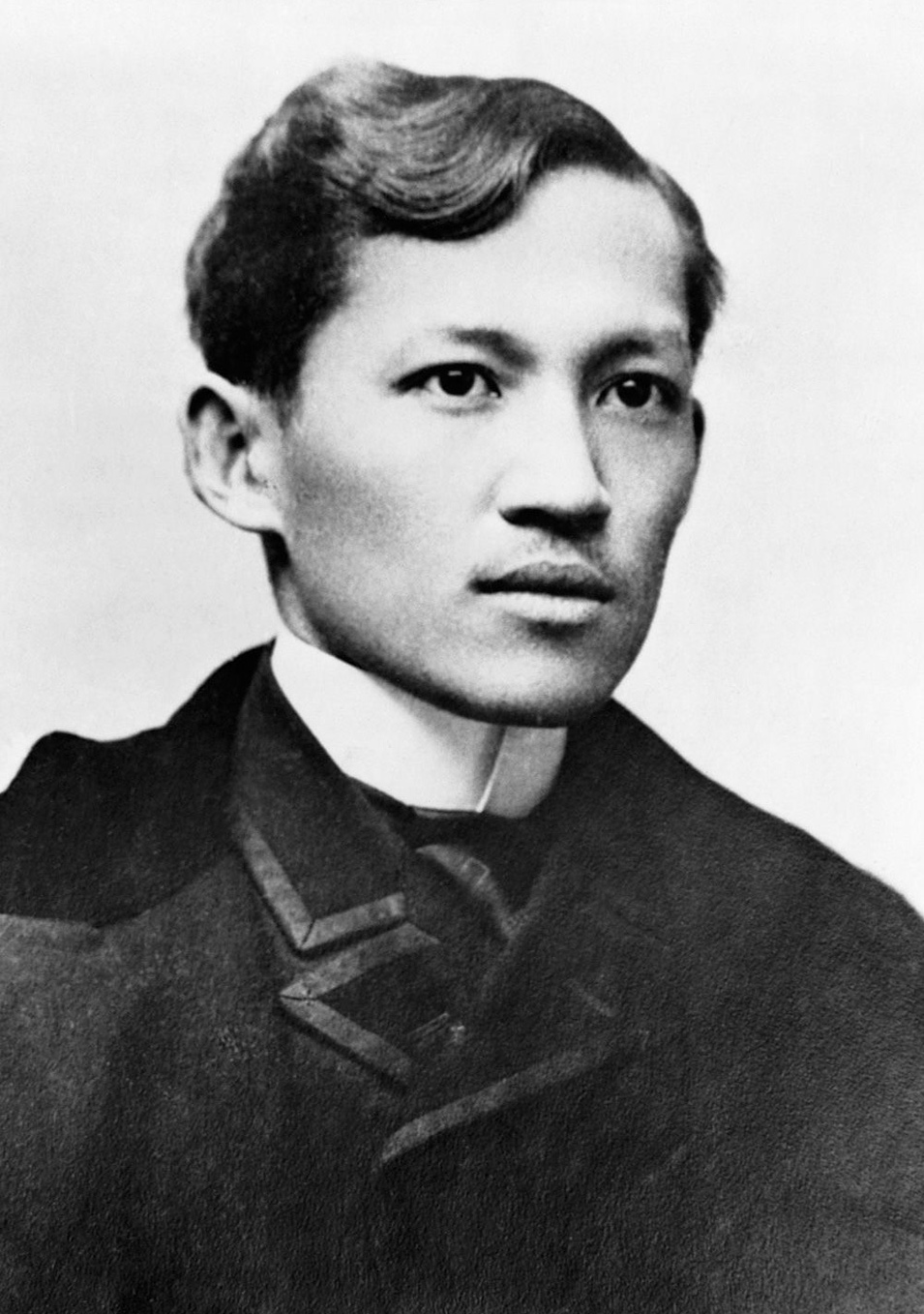
José Rizal

Andres Bonifacio

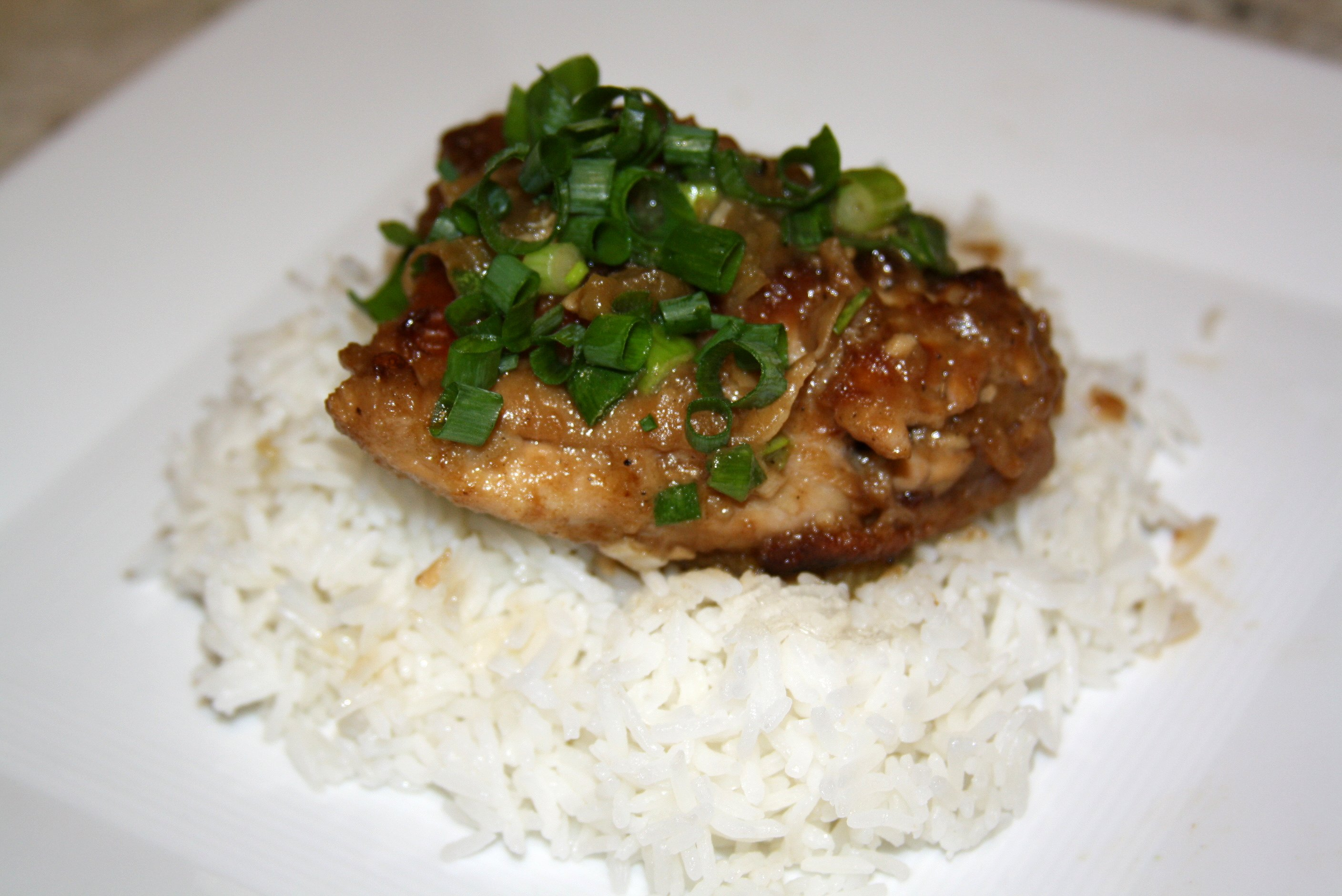
Rice topped with chicken adobo. Adobo is under consideration as the National Dish.

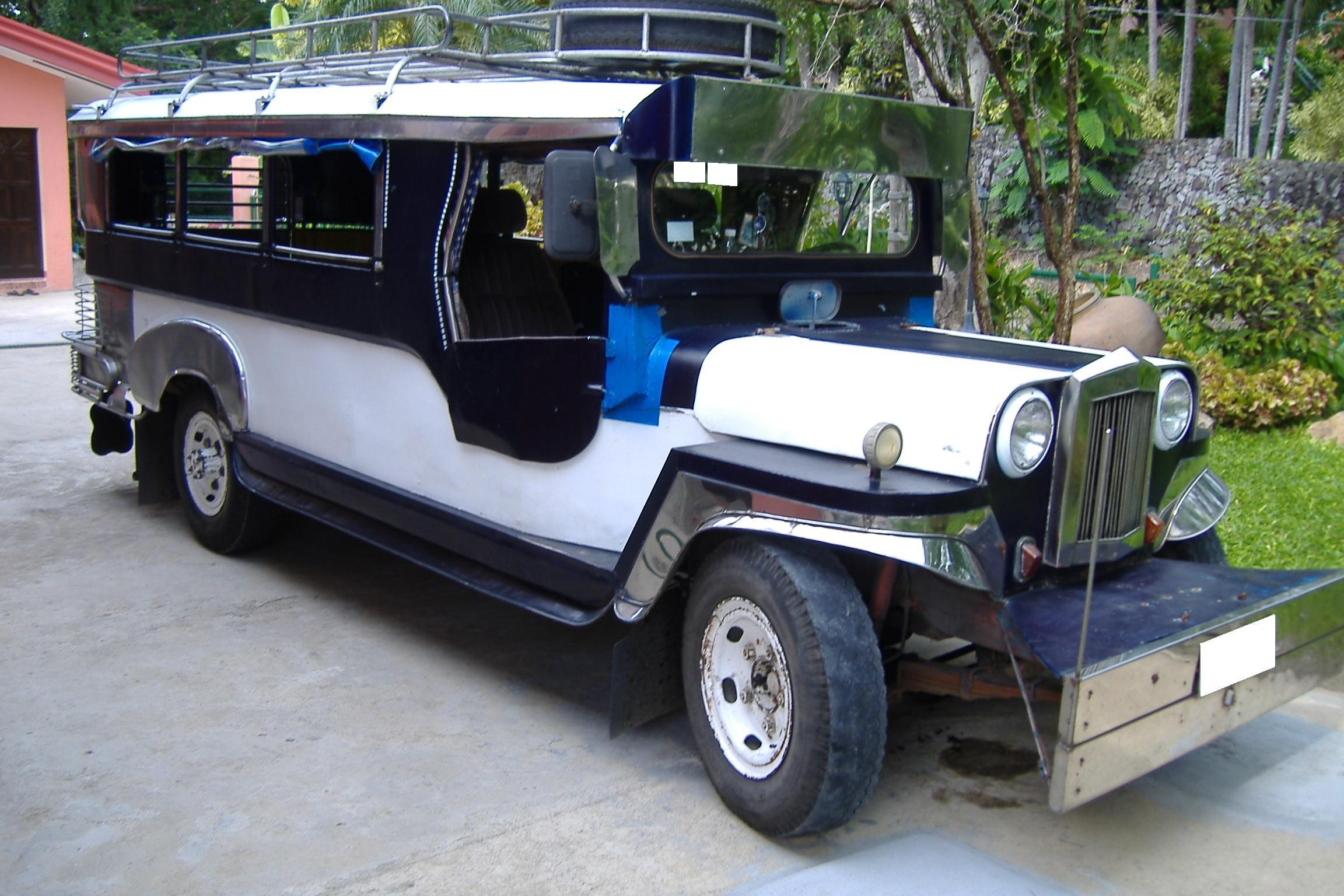
The Philippine jeepney is under consideration as the National Vehicle.

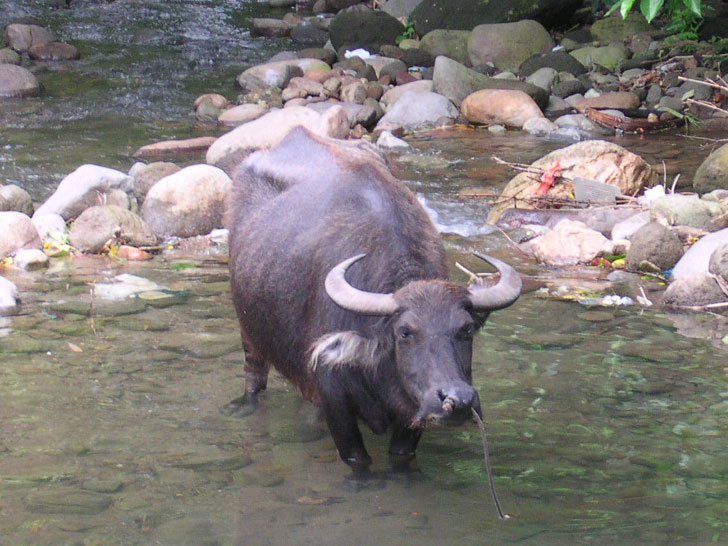
The Carabao is the National Animal for Philippines.

- The following individuals were recommended by the Technical Committee of the National Heroes Committee as national heroes:
  - Emilio Aguinaldo
  - Melchora Aquino
  - Andrés Bonifacio
  - Marcelo H. del Pilar
  - Sultan Dipatuan Kudarat
  - Juan Luna
  - Apolinario Mabini
  - José Rizal
  - Gabriela Silang
  - The review by the Technical Committee of National Heroes was revisited during the 14th Congress at the House of Representatives. In a resolution, a congresswoman added the following two historical figures to the nine heroes declared by the National Heroes Committee, making the total to eleven national heroes. This was referred to a Congressional Committee and remains unresolved.
  - Rizal and Bonifacio are considered implied national heroes according to NHCP.
- In August 2009, a bill called for official recognition of Corazon Aquino's as a national hero. In 2003, Benigno Aquino Jr., was already officially declared as one of the national heroes by then President Gloria Arroyo through an unspecified executive order according to the news report by The Philippine Star.
- Waling-waling as national flower; passed by Congress in 2013 but was vetoed by the President Benigno Aquino III.
- In 2013, House Bill 3431 was filed declaring Andres Bonifacio as national hero.
- The following were proposed as national symbols as per House Bill 3926 by Congressman Rene Relampagos. (The bill also includes the then eleven official symbols, which are not in the following list.)
  - Adobo as national food
  - Anahaw as national leaf
  - Bakya as national slippers
  - Bangus as national fish
  - Barong and Baro't saya as national costume
  - "Bayan Ko" as national song
  - Carabao as national animal
  - Cariñosa as national dance
  - Jeepney as national vehicle
  - Jose Rizal as national hero
  - Malacañang Palace as national seat of government
  - Mango as national fruit
  - Manila as national capital
  - Nipa hut (bahay kubo) as national house
  - Philippine peso as national currency
- The House of Representatives has approved on third and final reading of House Bill 6366, declaring the balangay as the national boat.
- The House of Representatives has approved House Bill 1022, declaring the baybayin as the national writing system.

=== From other sources ===
- Juan de la Cruz – as national personification (symbolizing the Filipino people)
- Lechon and sinigang as national food
- Sipa as national sport
- Tinikling as national dance

== Notes ==
1. ^{1} The description of the Philippines' coat of arms can be found under section 14 of Executive Order No. 292 (Book I/Chapter 4), which is also known as the Administrative Code of 1987.
