= National motto of the Philippines =

The national motto of the Philippines may refer to:

- Isang Bansa, Isang Diwa (Tagalog for "One Country, One Spirit"), the national motto of the Philippines from 1978 to 1986
- Maka-Diyos, Maka-Tao, Makakalikasan at Makabansa (Tagalog for "Godly, Humane, Nature Lover and Nationalistic"

And "Pium, humanum, environmental et nationale"(Latin); translated as "For God, People, Nature, and Country" or "For the Love of God, People, Nature, and Country"), the national motto of the Philippines from 1998 to present
