= List of Taguig symbols =

Taguig in Metro Manila

This is a list of symbols of Taguig.

== Insignia ==
Type	Symbol	Adopted	Image	Ref.
Flag	Flag of the City of Taguig		Flag of the City of Taguig	
Seal	Seal of Taguig	2019	Seal of the City of Taguig	
Seal	Seal of the Taguig City Council		Seal of the Taguig City Council	
Logo	I Love Taguig		Logo of the City of Taguig	
Motto	Think Big. Dream Big. Love Taguig.		Motto of the City of Taguig	
Trademark	Probinsyudad	2004	—N/a	
City anthem	Martsa ng Taguig	1990	—N/a	

== City Seal ==
Seal of Taguig
- The Seal of Taguig
- Armiger: City of Taguig
- Adopted: 2019 (Present seal)
- Use: To represent Taguig and the City Government, and as a seal of approval to authenticate certain documents and local government legislation.

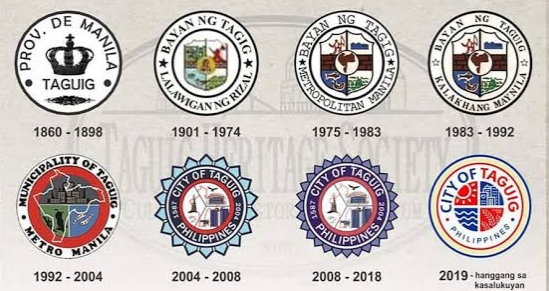
History of Taguig's City Seal up to the current iteration

The city's official seal has undergone many revisions over the years, reflecting its history as part of the province of Manila, province of Rizal, as an independent municipality within the National Capital Region, and its current status as a highly urbanized city.

The current official Seal of Taguig was adopted in 2019. It incorporates the colors of the Philippine flag: blue, red, white and yellow. The buildings symbolize the city's transformative growth and continued progress, the heart echoes the "I Love Taguig" motto, the sun represents bright future and warmth, the waves depict water and life, paying homage to the fishing livelihood of Taguigeños, and the rice grains describe the city's etymology (from taga-giik or rice thresher in Tagalog). The 28 grains represent the 28 barangays of Taguig at the time of its adoption, before the resolution of the border dispute with Makati and the addition of the 10 Embo barangays.
