= Secularism in the Philippines =

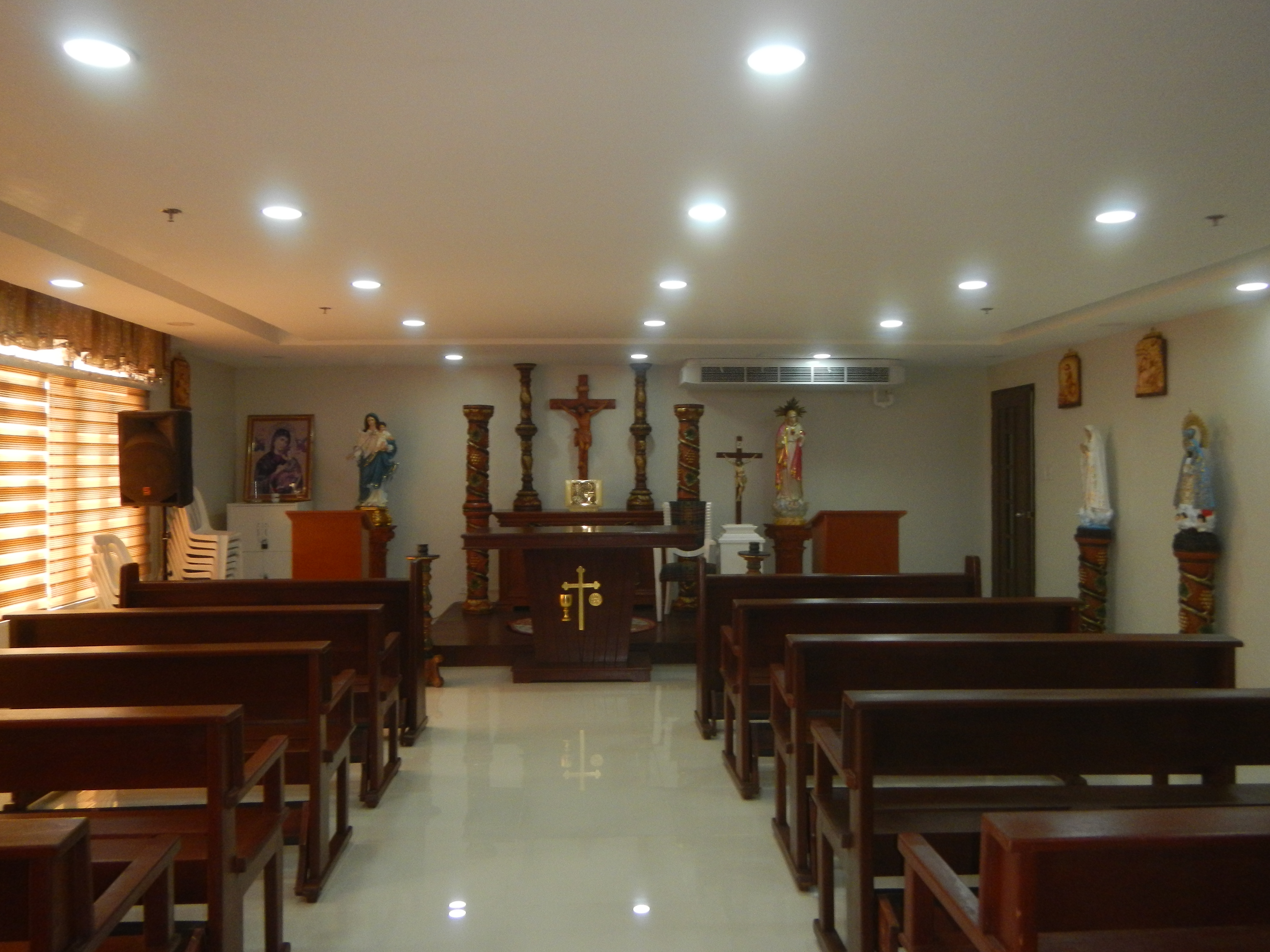
A Roman Catholic chapel inside the city hall of Caloocan, Metro Manila.

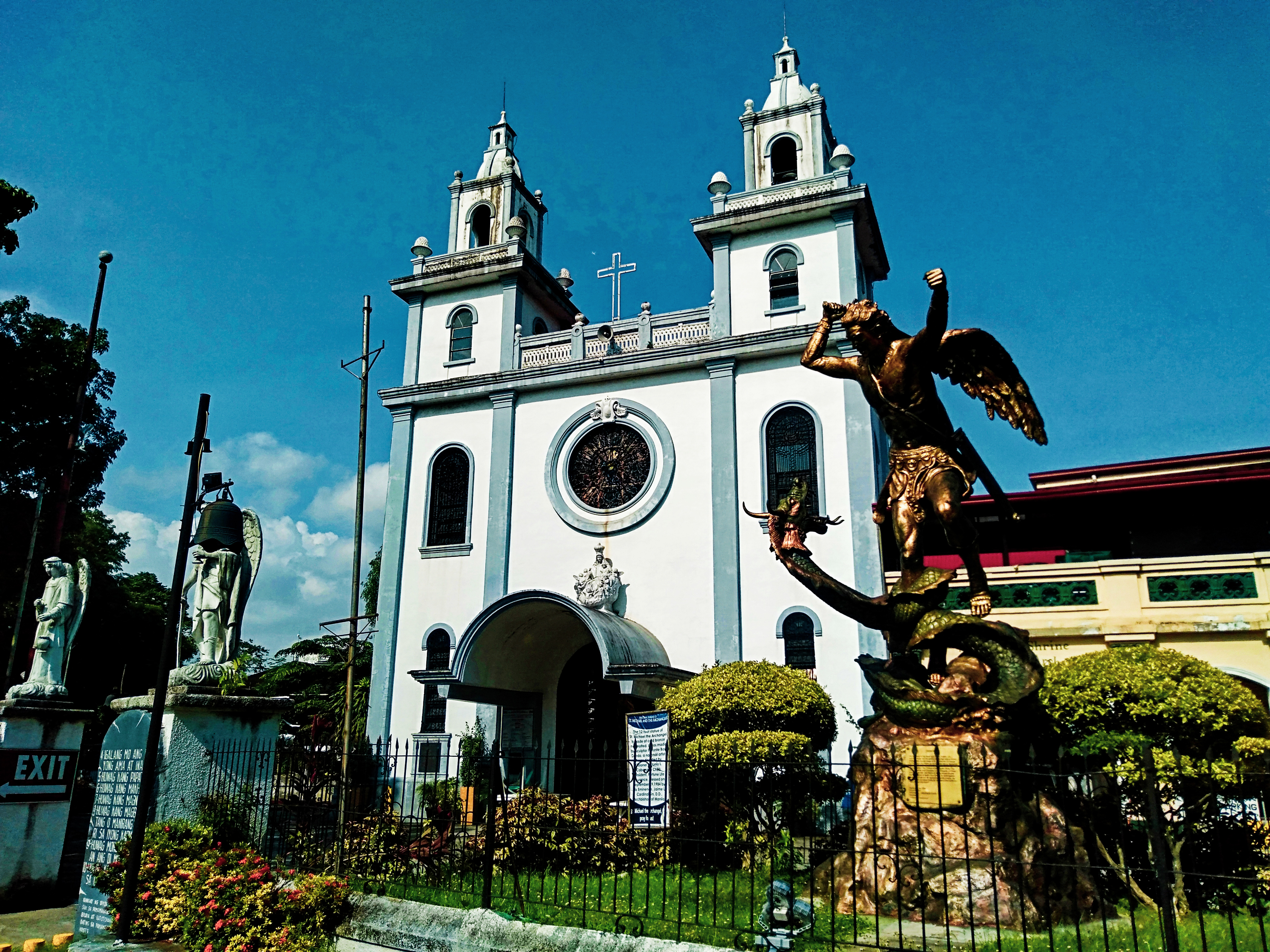
San Miguel Church, also known as Malacañang Church due to its proximity to the Malacañang Palace.

Secularism in the Philippines concerns the relationship of the Philippine government with religion. Officially the Philippines is a secular state, but religious institutions and religion play a significant role in the country's political affairs. Legal pluralism also persist with the application of Islamic personal laws for the country's Muslim population.

The Philippine government follows the doctrine of "benevolent neutrality" which affirms accommodation of religious exercises is not necessarily contrary to the Constitution.

== History ==
=== Spanish colonial era ===
The Spanish colonization of the Philippines in the 16th century was motivated by Catholicism. The Philippines became a Spanish colony in 1565, following the Magellan expedition's stopover in the islands in 1521. Religion played a significant role in the colony's governance. Due to the distance of the Philippines from the Iberian Peninsula, Spain had to rely on network of parishes and monastic orders for governance of the archipelago. The clergy had more de facto power over secular authorities. As a result of the intertwined relations of the secular colonial government and the Catholic Church, the Philippine Revolution which started in 1896 were both based on anti-colonial and anti-clerical grievances.

The Malolos Constitution adopted in 1899 for a Philippine revolutionary state explicitly takes a position against the establishment of a state religion. The document states that "The State recognizes the freedom and equality of all religions, as well as the separation of the Church and the State". There was a failed attempt to name Roman Catholicism as a state religion which would allow the practice of other religions as they were practiced privately and "did not endanger the security of the State". The separation clause was immediately suspended however by the constitution's proponents following the outbreak of the Philippine–American War.

=== United States colonial administration ===
Spain agreed to cede the Philippines and its other colonies to the United States in the 1898 Treaty of Paris following the aftermath of the Spanish-American War. The United States eventually gained control of the Philippines and made it its colony. The U.S. Congress enacted several "organic acts" for the Philippines which consistently had provisions apt for a secular state largely based on the American Bill of Rights. 1935 Constitution of the Philippines Commonwealth also mandates the separation of church and state.

=== Contemporary era ===
The Philippines became an independent Republic in 1946, its Constitution retain the provision on the separation of church and state. The 1973 Constitution adopted during the martial law era under President Ferdinand Marcos and the current Constitution adopted under President Corazon Aquino in 1987 also carried over this provision.

== Benevolent neutrality ==
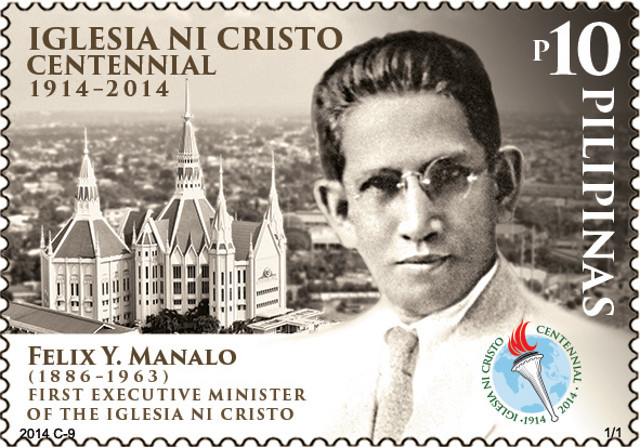
The PhilPost publication of a postal stamp commemorating the Iglesia ni Cristo Centennial was legally challenged and was alleged to be in violation of the separation of church and state clause of the Constitution. The Supreme Court ruled the printing of the stamps constitutional under "benevolent neutrality". The high court ruled that the government did not enndorse, nor encourage Filipinos to join INC through the printing of the stamp.

Philippine law follows the doctrine of "benevolent neutrality" which was affirmed in the Supreme Court ruling in Estrada v. Escritor. The doctrine "recognizes the religious nature of the Filipino people and the elevating influence of religion in society; at the same time, it acknowledges that [the] government must pursue its secular goals" and that the policy "incorporates the Constitutional principle of separation of the Church and the State while recognizing the people’s right to express their belief or nonbelief of a Supreme Being".

== Issues ==
=== Holidays ===
Religious observances are recognized as public holidays namely the Christian holidays of Maundy Thursday, Good Friday, All Saints Day, and Christmas and the Muslim observance of Eid al-Fitr.

=== Education ===
Despite the mandate of separation of church and state by the constitution, public schools are allowed to hold religion classes if the students' guardians request it. Under the Department of Education's policies, "Values Education" subject may be taught. Although distinct from the allowed "optional religious instruction", some schools teach Values Education with a Roman Catholic undertone. Due to most public school teachers being Roman Catholic, in some classrooms the image of the Virgin Mary is displayed and the practice of conducting prayers before classes is largely tolerated.

Islamic schools began to proliferate in Mindanao in the 1920s. The Philippine national government began integrating Islamic education into the mainstream education system in the 1970s.

In 1965, Miguel Cuenco proposed the passage of the Religious Instruction Bill which was largely backed by the Roman Catholic Church. It would allow teachers to teach religion in public schools. It was opposed by the Iglesia ni Cristo.

=== Marriage ===
The status of divorce being illegal in the Philippines is largely due to the influence of the Roman Catholic Church. The only other country to ban divorce is the Vatican City. It was legal in the Philippines during the American colonial period and the Japanese occupation during the World War II era. It became illegal with the enactment of the 1949 Civil Code. Couples could only file for legal separation or had their marriage voided through annulment. Muslims meanwhile are allowed to divorce.

== Role of Islam ==
Map depicting the jurisdiction of sharia district courts in Mindanao.

The Constitution provides explicit concession to Muslims, who are a minority in the Philippines, when it comes to state neutrality. It allows the Congress to enact "special courts with personal, family, and property law" for an autonomous region in Muslim Mindanao. This is implemented through Code of Muslim Personal Law. This is to accommodate the Moro ethnic group whose customs and traditions are largely reliant in Islam. The Code of Muslim Personal Laws in 1977 was enacted by President Ferdinand Marcos as an appeasement to the Moro independence movement which emerged in the late 1960s. It also provides for the establishment of Sharia district and circuit courts to cover personal affairs of Muslims in select localities in Mindanao. The Sharia court system became active in 1985.

The Islamic holiday of Eid al-Fitr has been a regular national public holiday since 2002. The status of the observance is by virtue of Republic Act 9177 and Presidential Proclamation 1083.

In Bangsamoro, Islam plays a significant role in the region. The interim government led by Murad Ebrahim pursued a policy of "moral governance" which is based on "moral virtues in Islam" noting that the Quran provides moral teachings address to the whole of mankind and not just to Muslims. Ebrahim, however is careful to not characterize the policy as equating to an official plan of establishing an Islamic government in the region.

== See also ==
- Freedom of religion in the Philippines
- Religion in the Philippines
- Irreligion in the Philippines
