= Ebralinag v. Division Superintendent =

Freedom of religion court case in the Philippines

- Court: Supreme Court of the Philippines en banc
Full case name
ROEL EBRALINAG, EMILY EBRALINAG, represented by their parents MR. & MRS. LEONARDO EBRALINAG, JUSTINIANA TANTOG, represented by her father AMOS TANTOG; JEMILOYAO & JOEL OYAO, represented by their parents MR. & MRS. ELIEZER OYAO; JANETH DIAMOS & JEREMIAS DIAMOS, represented by parents MR. & MRS. GODOFREDO DIAMOS; SARA OSTIA & JONATHAN OSTIA, represented by their parents MR. & MRS. FAUTO OSTIA; IRVIN SEQUINO & RENAN SEQUINO, represented by their parents MR. & MRS. LYDIO SEQUINO; NAPTHALE TANACAO, represented by his parents MR. & MRS. MANUEL TANACAO; PRECILA PINO, represented by her parents MR. & MRS. FELIPE PINO; MARICRIS ALFAR, RUWINA ALFAR, represented by their parents MR. & MRS. HERMINIGILDO ALFAR; FREDESMINDA ALFAR & GUMERSINDO ALFAR, represented by their parents ABDON ALFAR; ALBERTO ALFAR & ARISTIO ALFAR, represented by their parents MR. & MRS. GENEROSO ALFAR; MARTINO VILLAR, represented by his parents MR. & MRS. GENARO VILLAR; PERGEBRIEL GUINITA & CHAREN GUINITA, represented by their parents MR. & MRS. CESAR GUINITA; ALVIN DOOP, represented by his parents MR. & MRS. LEONIDES DOOP; RHILYN LAUDE, represented by her parents MR. & MRS. RENE LAUDE; LEOREMINDA MONARES, represented by her parents, MR. & MRS. FLORENCIO MONARES; MERCY MONTECILLO, represented by her parents MR. & MRS. MANUEL MONTECILLO; ROBERTO TANGAHA, represented by his parent ILUMINADA TANGAHA; EVELYN, MARIA & FLORA TANGAHA, represented by their parents MR. & MRS. ALBERTO TANGAHA; MAXIMO EBRALINAG, represented by his parents, MR. & MRS. PAQUITO EBRALINAG; JUTA CUMON, GIDEON CUMON & JONATHAN CUMON, represented by their father RAFAEL CUMON; EVIE LUMAKANG & JUNAR LUMAKANG, represented by their parents MR. & MRS. LUMAKANG; EMILIO SARSOZO, PAZ AMOR SARSOZO & IGNA MARIE SARSOZO, represented by their parents MR. & MRS. VIRGILIO SARSOZO; MICHAEL JOSEPH & HENRY JOSEPH, represented by parent ANNIE JOSEPH; EMERSON TABLASON & MASTERLOU TABLASON, represented by their parent EMERLITO TABLASON v. School Division of Schools of Cebu
One consolidated petition
MAY AMOLO, represented by her parents MR. & MRS. ISAIAS AMOLO; REDFORD ALSADO, JOEBERT ALSADO & RUDYARD ALSADO, represented by their parents MR. & MRS. ABELARDO ALSADO; NELIA ALSADO, REU ALSADO & LILIBETH ALSADO, represented by their parents MR. & MRS. ROLANDO ALSADO; SUZETTE NAPOLES, represented by her parents ISMAILITO NAPOLES & OPHELIA NAPOLES; JESICA CARMELOTES, represented by her parents MR. & MRS. SERGIO CARMELOTES; BABY JEAN MACAPAS, represented by her parents MR. & MRS. TORIBIO MACAPAS; GERALDINE ALSADO, represented by her parents MR. & MRS. JOEL ALSADO; RAQUEL DEMOTOR & LEAH DEMOTOR, represented by their parents MR. & MRS. LEONARDO DEMOTOR; JURELL VILLA & MELONEY VILLA, represented by their parents MR. & MRS. JOVENIANO VILLA; JONELL HOPE MAHINAY, MARY GRACE MAHINAY and MAGDALENE MAHINAY, represented by their parents MR. & MRS. FELIX MAHINAY; JONALYN ANTIOLA and JERWIN ANTIOLA, represented by their parents FELIFE ANTIOLA and ANECITA ANTIOLA; MARIA CONCEPCION CABUYAO, represented by her parents WENIFREDO CABUYAO and ESTRELLITA CABUYAO, NOEMI TURNO represented by her parents MANUEL TURNO and VEVENCIA TURNO; SOLOMON PALATULON, SALMERO PALATULON and ROSALINDA PALATULON, represented by their parents MARTILLANO PALATULON and CARMILA PALATULON v. THE DIVISION SUPERINTENDENT OF SCHOOLS OF CEBU, ANTONIO A. SANGUTAN (G.R. No. 95887)
- Decided: March 1, 1993
- G.R. numbers: 95770, et al.
- Citation: 292 Phil. 267; 219 SCRA 256

Case history
- Prior action(s): None, Supreme Court was first instance of both consolidated petitions
- Subsequent action(s): Motion for reconsideration denied December 29, 1995

Questions presented
- Whether school children who are members or a religious sect may be expelled from school (both public and private) for refusing to take part in a school flag ceremony owing to their religious beliefs

Holding
- Ponente: Carolina Griño-Aquino, joined by Andres Narvasa, Florentino Feliciano, Abdulwahid Bidin, Florenz Regalado, Hilario Davide Jr., Flerida Ruth Pineda-Romero, Rodolfo Rocon, Josue Bellosilo, Jose Melo, Jose Campos
- Religious freedom is fundamental right for which is entitled to the highest priority and the amplest protection among human rights. The petition for certiorari and prohibition is granted. The expulsion orders issued by the public respondents against the petitioners are hereby annulled and set aside.
- Concurrence: Isagani Cruz
- Concurrence: Teodoro R. Padilla
- Camilo Quiason and Hugo Gutierrez Jr. took no part in the consideration or decision of the case.

Laws applied
- Republic Act No. 1265; Department Order No. 8, Series of 1955
- This case overturned a previous ruling
- Gerona v. Secretary of Education

Keywords
- Freedom of religion

Ebralinag v. Division Superintendent, 292 Phil. 267 (1993), was a landmark decision of the Supreme Court of the Philippines concerning freedom of religion in schools. It involved 68 pupils from the towns of Asturias, Daanbantayan, Pinamungajan, Tuburan and Carcar, all in the province of Cebu, who were Jehovah's Witnesses expelled for refusing to sing the national anthem, salute the flag and recite the patriotic pledge in school as required by law. This ruling overturned the court's previous ruling on the same subject in Gerona v. Secretary of Education.

== Background ==
Sixty-eight high school and grade school students, all of whom were adherents of the non-trinitarian/Restorationist Christian sect, Jehovah's Witnesses, were expelled from their public schools in various towns in Cebu: Asturias, Daanbantayan, Pinamungajan, Carcar and Tuburan, for refusing to sing the national anthem, salute the flag and recite the patriotic pledge as required under Republic Act No. 1265 and Department Order No. 8, Series of 1955. Two teachers, one from each school, were also adherents of the same sect, and were removed from their positions for the same offense: one was fired and the other was forced to resign.

As practicing Jehovah's Witnesses, they were taught the practice of refraining from saluting the flag, singing the national anthem and reciting the patriotic pledge, on the belief that such constitute an "act of worship" or "religious devotion", which they cannot conscientiously participate in unless it is for God; they also believe that the action of flag salute and pledge transcends constitutional limitation into state power and invades the spirit which the Constitution protects against official control.

In 1989 the Department of Education, Culture and Sports (DECS) Regional Office in Cebu received complaints about Jehovah's Witnesses-affiliated teachers and pupils who were refusing to sing the national anthem, salute the national flag and recite the patriotic pledge. Division superintendent Susana Cabahug and assistant superintendent Dr. Marcelo Bacalso wrote a division memorandum recalling the previous Supreme Court's decision Gerona v. Secretary of Education, rebuking and condemning the pupils and teachers who refused to do so. Cebu school officials created a number of ways to persuade students to obey the memorandum; on one occasion, pupils at Buenavista Elementary School were asked to sign an agreement to sing the national anthem and recite the Patriotic Oath. Daanbantayan district supervisor Manuel F. Biongcog ordered the expulsion of the students who refused to pledge, stating that those who "opted to follow their religious belief against the Flag Salute Law" were "forfeit[ing] their right to attend public schools.

When the expulsion order came into effect on October 23, 1990, 43 of the expelled students wrote a petition to Secretary of Education Isidro Cariño, but no answer was received. The petition of the 25 students in G.R. No. 95887 were also expelled because the new division superintendent of schools, Dr. Pablo Antopina, did not recall the expulsion orders and caused expulsion of more children of Jehovah Witnesses instead. The parents of the students filed for specific civil actions for mandamus, certiorari and prohibition on October 31, 1990, alleging that the public acted in or without in excess of their jurisdiction and with grave abuse of discretion. On November 27, 1990, the Supreme Court issued a temporary restraining order and a writ of preliminary mandatory injunction commanding the respondents to immediately re-admit the petitioners to their respective classes until the further orders from the court.

== Argument ==
On May 13, 1991, the Solicitor General filed a consolidated comment to the petitioners defending the expulsion orders issued by the public respondents that says:

1. Bizarre religious practices of the Jehovah's Witnesses produce rebellious and anti-social school children and consequently disloyal and mutant Filipino citizens.
2. There are no new and valid grounds to sustain the charges of the Jehovah's Witnesses that the DECS rules and regulations on the flag salute ceremonies are violative of their freedom of religion and worship.
3. The flag salute is devoid of any religious significance; instead, it inculcates respect and love of country, for which the flag stands.
4. The State's compelling interests being pursued by the DECS' lawful regulations in question do not warrant exemption of the school children of the Jehovah's Witnesses from the flag salute ceremonies on the basis of their own self-perceived religious convictions.
5. The issue is not freedom of speech but enforcement of law and jurisprudence.
6. State's power to regulate repressive and unlawful religious practices justified, besides having scriptural basis.
7. The penalty of expulsion is legal and valid, more so with the enactment of Executive Order No. 292 (the Administrative Code of 1987). But the petitioners argued that even though they do not take part at compulsory flag ceremony they still show respect by standing quietly during the flag ceremony and having attention and not engaging in "external acts" or actions that would offend the heart of the countrymen who believe that expressing their love of the county through observance of flag ceremony.

Three questions were presented:

1. Whether or not school children who were members who are members of a religious sect may be expelled from school for disobedience to Republic Act No. 1265 and Department Order No. 8, Series of 1955
2. Whether or not the expulsion of the Students in refusing to participate in the Flag Ceremony in compliance with the teaching of the Jehovah’s Witnesses violates their Right to Freedom of Religion.
3. Whether or not the expulsion of the students is unconstitutional.

The Supreme Court ruled in favor of Ebralinag and the other expelled students, with the court ruling that "a similar exemption may be accorded to the Jehovah's Witnesses with regard to the observance of the flag ceremony out of respect for their religious beliefs, however 'bizarre' those beliefs may seem to others. Nevertheless, their right not to participate in the flag ceremony does not give them a right to disrupt such patriotic exercises." The Supreme Court further contended that the expulsion orders of the students who were members of Jehovah's Witnesses violated their right as a Filipino citizen under Section 1, Article 14 of the 1987 Constitution that seeks to "protect and promote the right of all citizens to quality education.....and to make such education accessible to all." The court also declared that the expulsion order was unconstitutional and violated their right of freedom of religion.

In his concurring opinion, Associate Justice Isagani Cruz said that "..freedom of choice guarantees the liberty of the religious conscience and prohibits any degree of any compulsion or burden, whether direct or indirect, in the practice of one's religion."

== See also ==
- Freedom of religion in the Philippines
- Secularism in the Philippines
