= Maka-Diyos, Maka-tao, Makakalikasan at Makabansa =

National motto of the Philippines

Maka-Diyos, Maka-Tao, Makakalikasan at Makabansa incorporated into the Great Seal of the Philippines.

Maka-Diyos, Maka-tao, Makakalikasan at Makabansa (Filipino for "For God, People, Nature, and Country" or "For the Love of God, People, Nature, and Country") is the national motto of the Philippines. Derived from the last four lines of the Pledge of Allegiance to the Philippine Flag, it was adopted on February 12, 1998, with the passage of Republic Act No. 8491, the Flag and Heraldic Code of the Philippines, during the presidency of Fidel V. Ramos. Its adoption came twelve years after the abolition of the country's previous motto, "Isang Bansa, Isang Diwa", which was adopted during the presidency of Ferdinand Marcos in 1979.

== Reception ==
The motto has been interpreted as embodying a set of common core Filipino values, with each of the four being connected to one another. Columnist Bobit Avila of the Philippine Star interpreted the motto as showing that Filipinos love God first before anything else. Another columnist, Kay Malilong Isberto of The Freeman, the Cebu City-based sister paper of the Star, meanwhile explains that the motto represents the duties of good Filipino citizens.

Although Maka-Diyos, Maka-tao, Makakalikasan at Makabansa was made official in 1998, most Filipinos are unaware of it. In 2007, columnist Geronimo L. Sy wrote in the Manila Times that the Philippines didn't have a national motto (which he called a "national slogan") and that many of the societal problems plaguing the country were because of a lack of common direction that a national motto would embody, despite the Flag and Heraldic Code being made law nine years earlier. Isberto would later suggest that most people probably don't know that there is a national motto to begin with, and of those who do know that there is one, they probably didn't take the time to contemplate how the motto should apply to their everyday lives. This view was echoed by Manuel Quezon III in the Philippine Daily Inquirer, who also criticized the motto for being "kilometric", as well as lawyer Lorna Kapunan, writing in BusinessMirror, where she expressed surprise at the existence of a national motto because she had not seen it in use anywhere. She continues on to write that the government should mandate that it be displayed prominently in government offices as a reminder of officials' civic duty.

Avila notes that while "Maka-Diyos, Maka-tao, Makakalikasan at Makabansa" is "perfect" as a national motto, he claims that because most Filipinos only look out for themselves, they don't abide by the doctrines of their Christian faith, which makes the motto problematic in comparison to mottos like "Bhinneka Tunggal Ika". This is in sharp contrast to his 2013 criticism of "Isang Bansa, Isang Diwa", which he denounced as embodying poorly-executed Jacobinist thought.

== Pledge of Allegiance / Panunumpa Sa Watawat ng Pilipinas ==
The national motto is inscribed in the Great Seal of the Philippines and the last part of the Pledge of Allegiance:

| Filipino Version | English translation |
|---|---|
| Ako ay Pilipino Buong katapatang nanunumpa Sa watawat ng Pilipinas At sa bansang kanyang sinasagisag Na may dangal, katarungan at kalayaan Na pinakikilos ng sambayanang Maka-Diyos Maka-tao Makakalikasan at Makabansa. | I am a Filipino I pledge my allegiance To the flag of the Philippines And to the country it represents With honor, justice and freedom Put in motion by one Nation For God, People, Nature, and Country. |

== See also ==
- Flag of the Philippines
- Lupang Hinirang
- Panatang Makabayan
