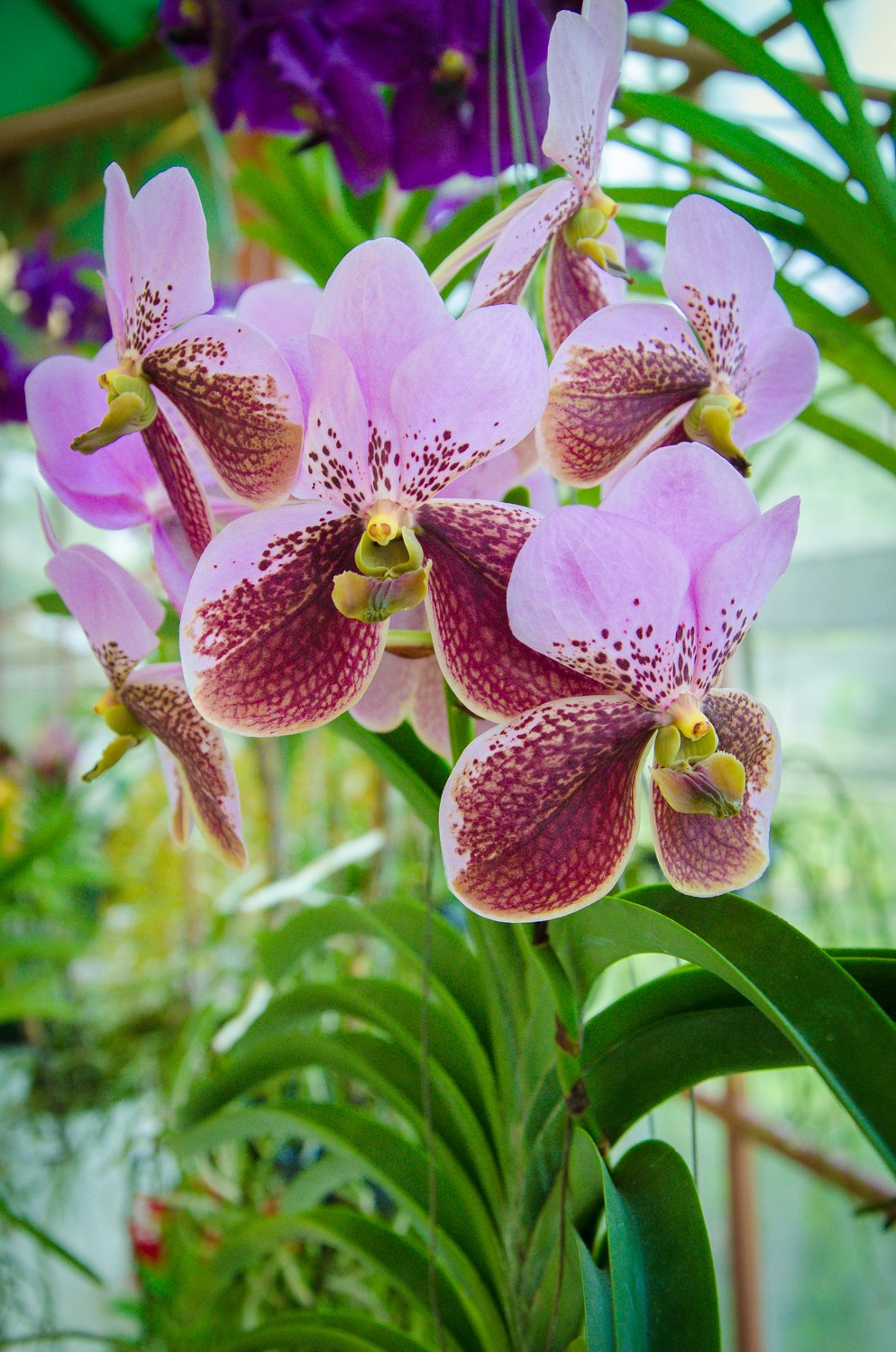
- flower detail

Scientific classification
- Kingdom: Plantae
- Clade: Embryophytes
- Clade: Tracheophytes
- Clade: Spermatophytes
- Clade: Angiosperms
- Clade: Monocots
- Order: Asparagales
- Family: Orchidaceae
- Subfamily: Epidendroideae
- Genus: Vanda
- Species: V. sanderiana

Binomial name
- Vanda sanderiana (Rchb.f.) Rchb.f.
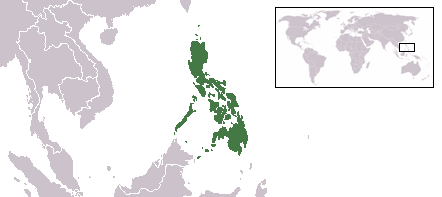
- Vanda sanderiana is endemic to the Philippines

Synonyms
- List: Euanthe sanderiana (Rchb.f.) Schlechter; Esmeralda sanderiana Rchb.f.; Euanthe sanderiana f. albata (Rchb.f.) M.Wolff & O.Gruss; Euanthe sanderiana f. immaculata (Golamco) Cootes; Vanda sanderiana var. albata Rchb.f.; Vanda sanderiana var. immaculata Golamco

= Waling-waling =

Vanda sanderiana

Species of orchid

Vanda sanderiana is a species of orchid. It is commonly called waling-waling in the Philippines and is also called Sander's Vanda, after Henry Frederick Conrad Sander, a noted orchidologist. The orchid is considered to be the "Queen of Philippine flowers" and is worshiped as a diwata by the indigenous Bagobo people.

== Description ==
=== Vegetative characteristics ===
The leaves are strap shaped.

=== Generative characteristics ===
The erect inflorescence bears 8–12 flowers with broad, flat sepals and petals.

== Taxonomy ==
It was first published as Esmeralda sanderiana Rchb.f. by Heinrich Gustav Reichenbach in 1882. It was transferred to the genus Vanda R.Br. as Vanda sanderiana (Rchb.f.) Rchb.f. published by Heinrich Gustav Reichenbach in 1882. It is placed in Vanda sect. Roeblingiana.

=== Varieties ===
The Philippine Orchid Society, which incorporates an image of the flower in its logo, states that the species has three varieties:

- Vanda sanderiana var. albata Reichb. f. in Gard. Chron. ser. 3.2 (1887) 9. Esmeralda sanderiana var. albata Will

Described by Heinrich Gustav Reichenbach in The Gardeners' Chronicle in 1887, the plant's flower size is smaller than that of the species. Its lateral sepals are yellowish-green with white margins. Its dorsal sepal and petals are white with purple spots at the base. The labellum has purple dots. This plant was reported from Davao del Sur and South Cotabato on Mindanao Island where it grows as an epiphyte at elevations to 500 meters. This variety is now extremely rare in its natural habitat.

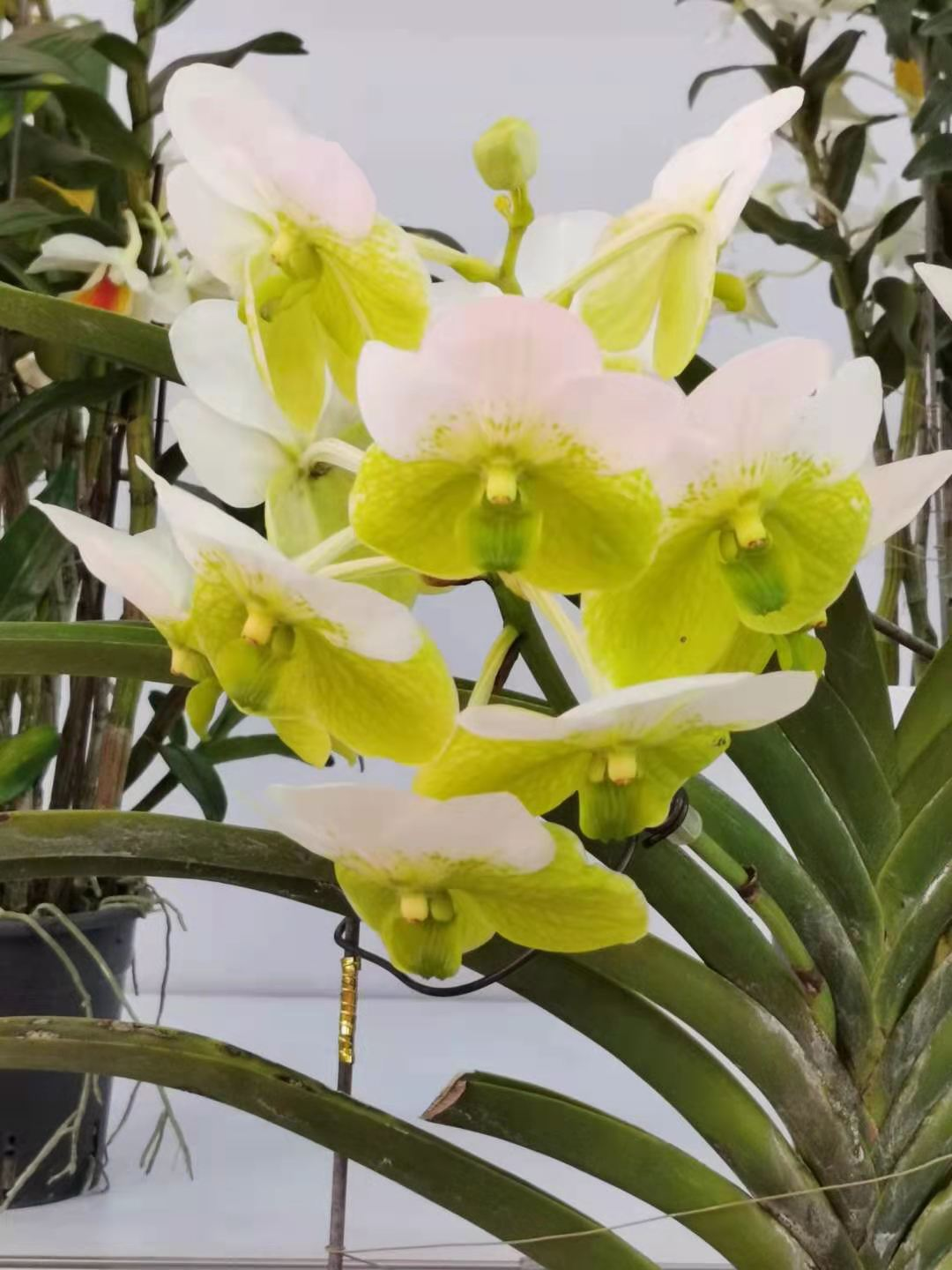
V. sanderiana var. alba. The petals are actually light green, not the yellow-green in the photo.

- Vanda sanderiana var. froebeliana Cogn. in Dict. Icon. des. Orch.Vanda t. 12 a (1903)

This variety has bright rose flower stalks and has very large flowers compared to the species. The lateral sepals are bright yellow, with rose coloration towards the margins and densely covered with large purple reticulated veins. The dorsal sepal and petals are rose-colored on the upper half, while the lower half has brownish-purple spots.

- Vanda sanderiana var. labello-viridi Linden & Rodigas in Lindenia 1:85, t (1885) 40. Esmeralda sanderiana var. labello-viridi Will

This variety is similar to the species, with the exception that the lip or labellum is green with crimson stripes.

== Distribution ==
Vanda sanderiana is endemic to Mindanao in the provinces of Davao, Cotabato, and Zamboanga where it is found on the trunks of dipterocarp trees at elevations below 500 meters. Over-collected, the plant is considered rare in nature. It is often used in hybridization.

== Use ==
=== Symbolism ===
In 2004, a motion was filed in the House of Representatives of the Philippines to declare the waling-waling as the country's national flower, replacing the sampaguita. In 2013, a bill was passed by the Philippine Senate declaring the waling-waling as a national flower alongside the sampaguita. However, the House Bill 5655 was vetoed by President Benigno Aquino III citing that other means were available to promote the protection and preservation of the orchid without declaring it a second national flower.
