= Second Philippine Republic =

1943–1945 Japanese puppet state

Republic of the Philippines Repúbliká ng Pilipinas (Tagalog) República de Filipinas (Spanish) フィリピン共和国 (Japanese)
- 1943–1945
- Flag Coat of arms
- Motto: Kapayapaan, Kalayaan, Katarungan (English: "Peace, Freedom, Justice")
- Anthem: Diwà ng Bayan (English: "Spirit of the Nation") Awit sa Paglikha ng Bagong Pilipinas (English: "Hymn to the Creation of the New Philippines")
- Great Seal

- The Philippines (dark red) within the Empire of Japan (light red) at its furthest extent.
- Status: Puppet state of the Empire of Japan
- Capital: Manila (1942–1945); Baguio (1945)
- Common languages: Tagalog; Spanish; English; Japanese; Other regional languages
- Government: Presidential republic under a military dictatorship
- President
  - 1943–1945: José P. Laurel
- Military Governor
  - 1943–1944: Shigenori Kuroda
  - 1944–1945: Tomoyuki Yamashita
- Speaker of the National Assembly
  - 1943–1944: Benigno Aquino Sr.
- Legislature: National Assembly
- Historical era: World War II
  - Established: October 14, 1943
  - Proclaimed dissolved: August 17, 1945
- Currency: Japanese government–issued Philippine peso (₱)
- Date format: mm/dd/yyyy; dd-mm-yyyy
Preceded by	Succeeded by
Philippine Executive Commission	Commonwealth of the Philippines
- Today part of: Philippines

The Second Philippine Republic, officially the Republic of the Philippines (Note: Tagalog: Repúbliká ng Pilipinas; Spanish: República de Filipinas; Japanese: フィリピン共和国, Firipin-kyōwakoku) and also known as the Japanese-sponsored Philippine Republic, was a pro-Axis government established on October 14, 1943, during the Japanese occupation of the islands until its dissolution on August 17, 1945.

== Background ==
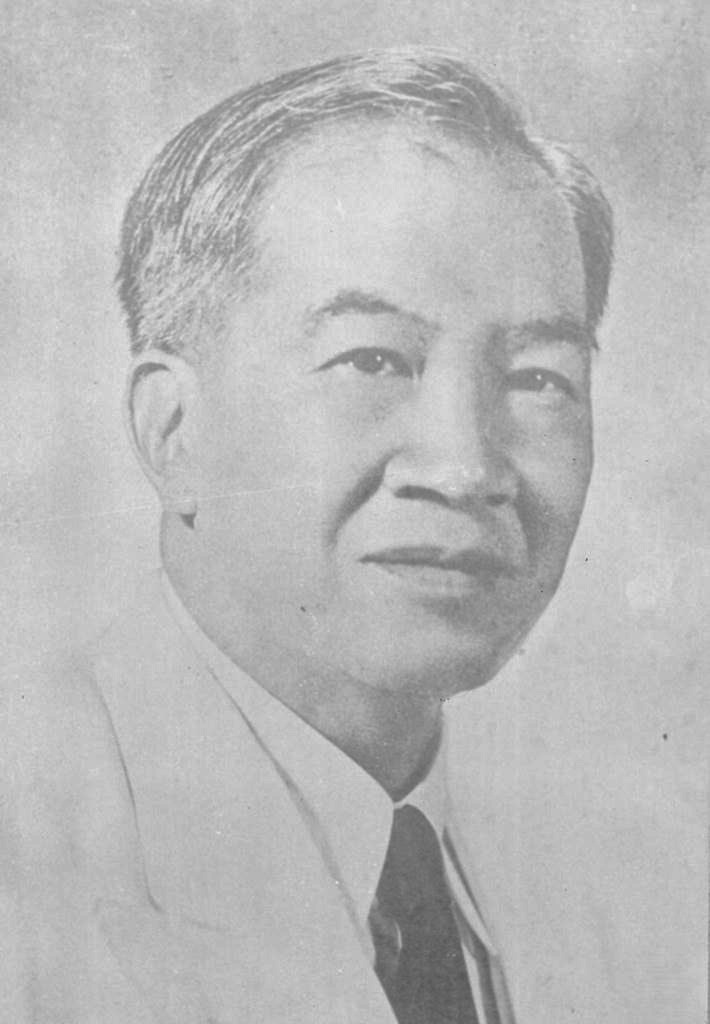
President Jose P. Laurel

After the Japanese invasion of the Philippines, President Manuel L. Quezon had declared the national capital Manila an "open city", and left it under the rule of Jorge B. Vargas, as mayor. The Japanese entered the city on January 2, 1942, and established it as the capital. Japan fully captured the Philippines on May 6, 1942, after the Battle of Corregidor.

General Masaharu Homma decreed the dissolution of the Commonwealth of the Philippines and established the Philippine Executive Commission (Komisyong Tagapagpaganap ng Pilipinas), a caretaker government, with Vargas as its first chairman in January 1942. KALIBAPI – Kapisanan sa Paglilingkod sa Bagong Pilipinas (Tagalog for the "Association for Service to the New Philippines") – was formed by Proclamation No. 109 of the Philippine Executive Commission, a piece of legislation passed on December 8, 1942, banning all existing political parties and creating the new governing alliance. Its first director-general was Benigno Aquino, Sr. The pro-Japanese Ganap Party, which saw the Japanese as the saviors of the archipelago, was absorbed into the KALIBAPI.

=== Independence ===
Before the formation of the Preparatory Commission, the Japanese gave an option to put the Philippines under the dictatorship of Artemio Ricarte, whom the Japanese returned from Yokohama to help bolster their propaganda movement. However, the Philippine Executive Commission refused this option and chose to make the Philippines a republic instead. During his first visit to the Philippines on May 6, 1943, Prime Minister Hideki Tōjō promised to return independence to the Philippines as part of its propaganda of Pan-Asianism (Asia for the Asians).

This prompted the KALIBAPI to create the Preparatory Committee for Philippine Independence on June 19, 1943. A draft constitution was formed by the Preparatory Commission for Independence, consisting of 20 members from the KALIBAPI. The Preparatory Commission, led by José P. Laurel, presented its draft Constitution on September 4, 1943, and three days later, the KALIBAPI general assembly ratified the draft Constitution.

By September 20, 1943, the KALIBAPI's representative groups in the country's provinces and cities elected from among themselves fifty-four members of the Philippine National Assembly, the legislature of the country, with fifty-four governors and city mayors as ex-officio members.

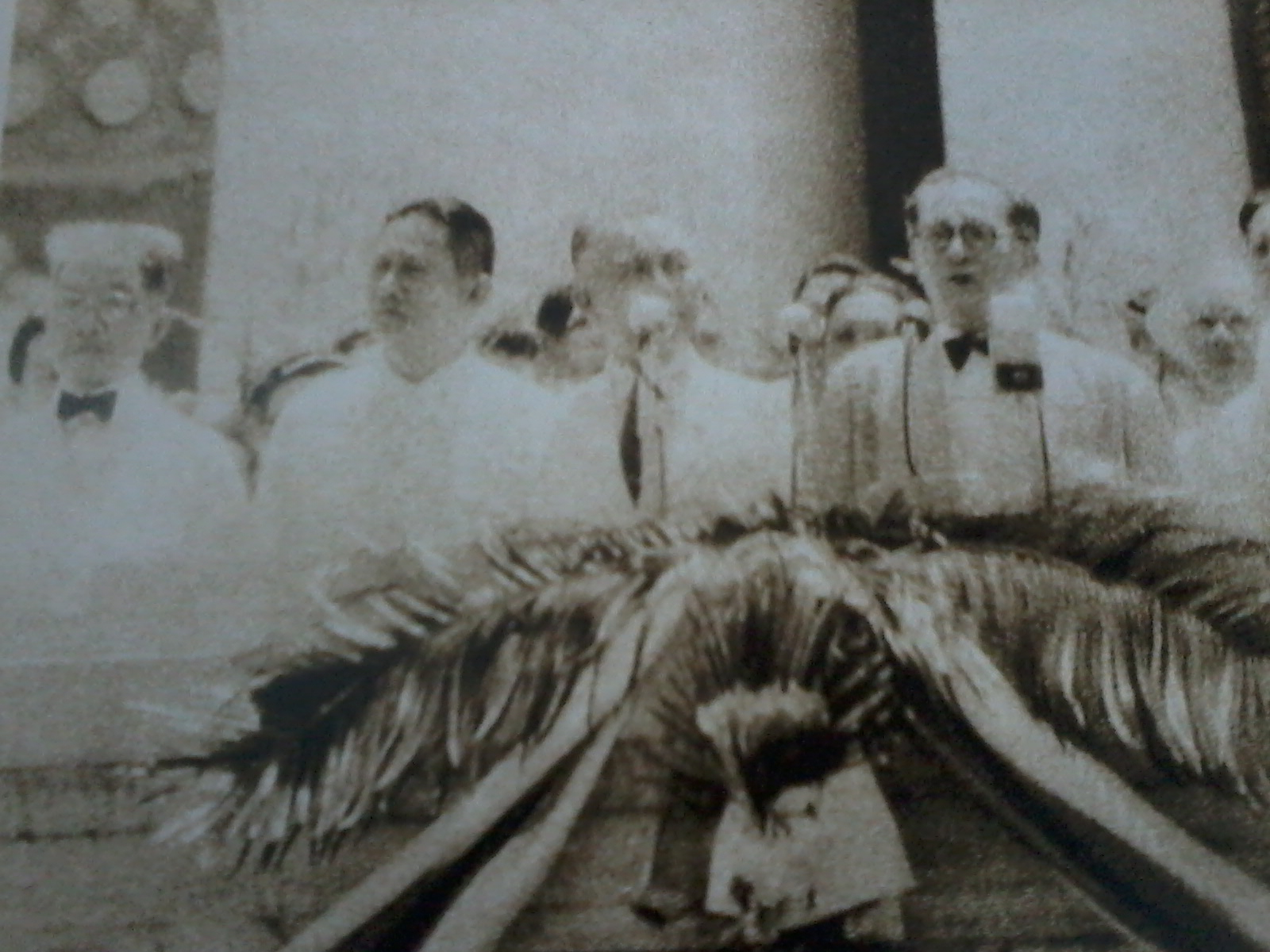
Preparatory Commission for Independence Chairman Jose P. Laurel addresses a public gathering; youths march to celebrate the signing of a draft constitution in the Philippines.

Three days after establishing the National Assembly, its inaugural session was held at the pre-war Legislative Building and it elected by majority Benigno S. Aquino as its first Speaker and José P. Laurel as President of the Republic of the Philippines, who was inaugurated on October 14, 1943, at the foundation of the Republic, the Legislative Building. Former President Emilio Aguinaldo and General Artemio Ricarte raised the Philippine flag, the same one used during the Philippine–American War which featured an anthropomorphic sun, during the inauguration. This was the first time since the Japanese occupation that the flag was displayed and the anthem played.

On the same day, a Pact of Alliance was signed between the new Republic and the Japanese government that was ratified two days later by the National Assembly.

Aguinaldo's flag which was briefly used as the de facto flag of the Second Republic in 1943.

On December 13, 1943, a version of the Philippine flag with no markings on the sun was adopted as the Second Republic's flag through Executive Order 17. On September 23, 1944, at 10:00 in the morning, President Laurel proclaimed that a state of war existed between the Philippine Republic and both the United States of America and the United Kingdom of Great Britain and Northern Ireland. By virtue of this proclamation the Philippine flag was inverted to signify that the Philippines was officially in a state of war. The (war) flag remained as the official flag until the formal dissolution of the Second Philippine Republic.

== Government ==
=== Cabinet ===
OFFICE	NAME	TERM
President; Minister of Home Affairs (concurrent capacity)	José P. Laurel	1943–1945
Speaker of the National Assembly	Benigno S. Aquino	1943–1945
Executive Secretary	Pedro Sabido	1943–1944
Minister of Public Works and Communications	Quintin Paredes	1943–1945
Minister of Agriculture and Natural Resources	Rafael Alunan Sr.	1943–1945
Minister of Health, Labor and Public Welfare	Emiliano Tria Tirona	1943–1944
Minister of Education	Camilo Osías	1943–1945
Minister of Justice	Teofilo Sison	1943–1945
Minister of Finance	Antonio de las Alas	1943–1945
Minister of Foreign Affairs	Claro M. Recto	1943–1945

=== Greater East Asia Conference ===
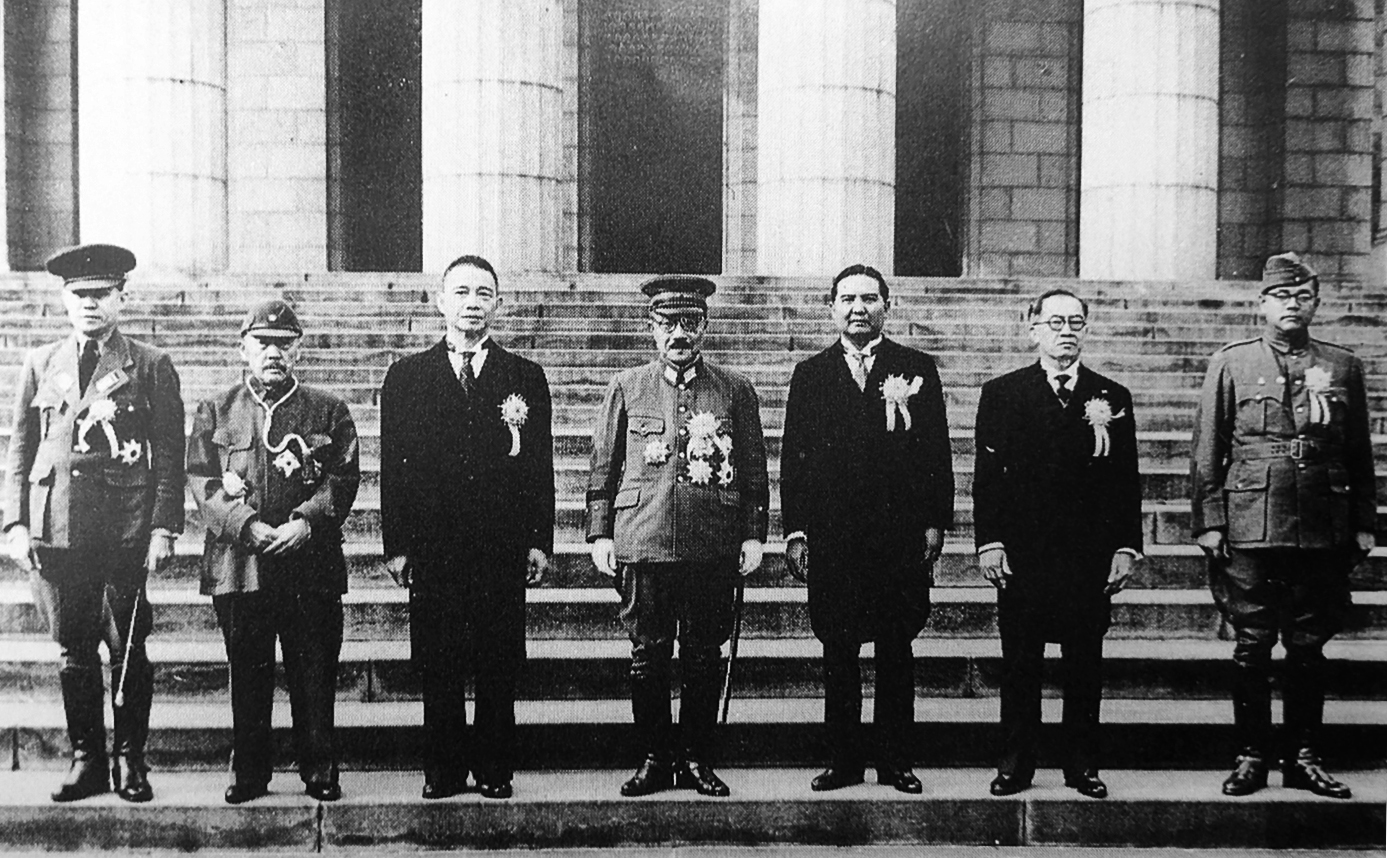
Greater East Asia Conference in November 1943, Japanese PM Hideki Tōjō (center) with heads of Japan-supported regimes (L–R): Ba Maw (State of Burma), Zhang Jinghui (Manchukuo), Wang Jingwei (Republic of China, Nanjing), Tōjō, Wan Waithayakon (Thailand), José P. Laurel (Second Philippine Republic), and Subhas Chandra Bose (Provisional Government of Free India)

The Greater East Asia Conference (大東亜会議, Dai Tōa Kaigi) was an international summit held in Tokyo from November 5 to 6, 1943, in which Japan hosted the heads of state of various component members of the Greater East Asia Co-Prosperity Sphere. The event was also referred to as the Tokyo Conference. The Conference addressed few issues of substance, but was intended from the start as a propaganda show piece, to illustrate the Empire of Japan's commitments to the Pan-Asianism ideal and to emphasize its role as the "liberator" of Asia from Western colonialism.

The conference and the formal declaration adhered to on November 6 was little more than a propaganda gesture designed to rally regional support for the next stage of the war, outlining the ideals of which it was fought. However, the Conference marked a turning point in Japanese foreign policy and relations with other Asian nations. The defeat of Japanese forces on Guadalcanal (in present-day Solomon Islands) and an increasing awareness of the limitations to Japanese military strength led the Japanese civilian leadership to realize that a framework based on cooperation, rather than colonial domination, would enable a greater mobilization of manpower and resources against the resurgent Allied Forces. It was also the start of efforts to create a framework that would allow for some form of diplomatic compromise should the military solution fail altogether. However these moves came too late to save the Empire, which surrendered to the Allies less than two years after the conference.

== Society ==
During his term in office, Laurel was faced with various problems that the country was experiencing, such as the following:

- Shortages of food, clothing, oil, and other necessities
- Heavy Japanese military presence throughout the entire region
- Japanese control of transportation, media, and communications

Laurel attempted to show that the independence of the republic was genuine by rectifying these problems.

=== Food shortages ===
Prioritizing the shortages of food, he organized an agency to distribute rice, even though most of the rice was confiscated by Japanese soldiers. Manila was one of the many places in the country that suffered from severe shortages, due mainly to a typhoon that struck the country in November 1943. The people were forced to cultivate private plots which produced root crops like kangkong. The Japanese, in order to raise rice production in the country, brought a quick-maturing horai rice, which was first used in Taiwan. Horai rice was expected to make the Philippines self-sufficient in rice by 1943, but rains during 1942 prevented this from happening.

In addition, carabaos provided the necessary labor that allowed Filipino farmers to grow rice and other staples. Japanese army patrols would slaughter the carabaos for meat, thereby preventing the farmers from growing enough rice to feed the large population. Before World War II, an estimated three million carabaos inhabited the Philippines. By the end of the war, an estimated nearly 70% of them had been lost.

=== Japanese money ===
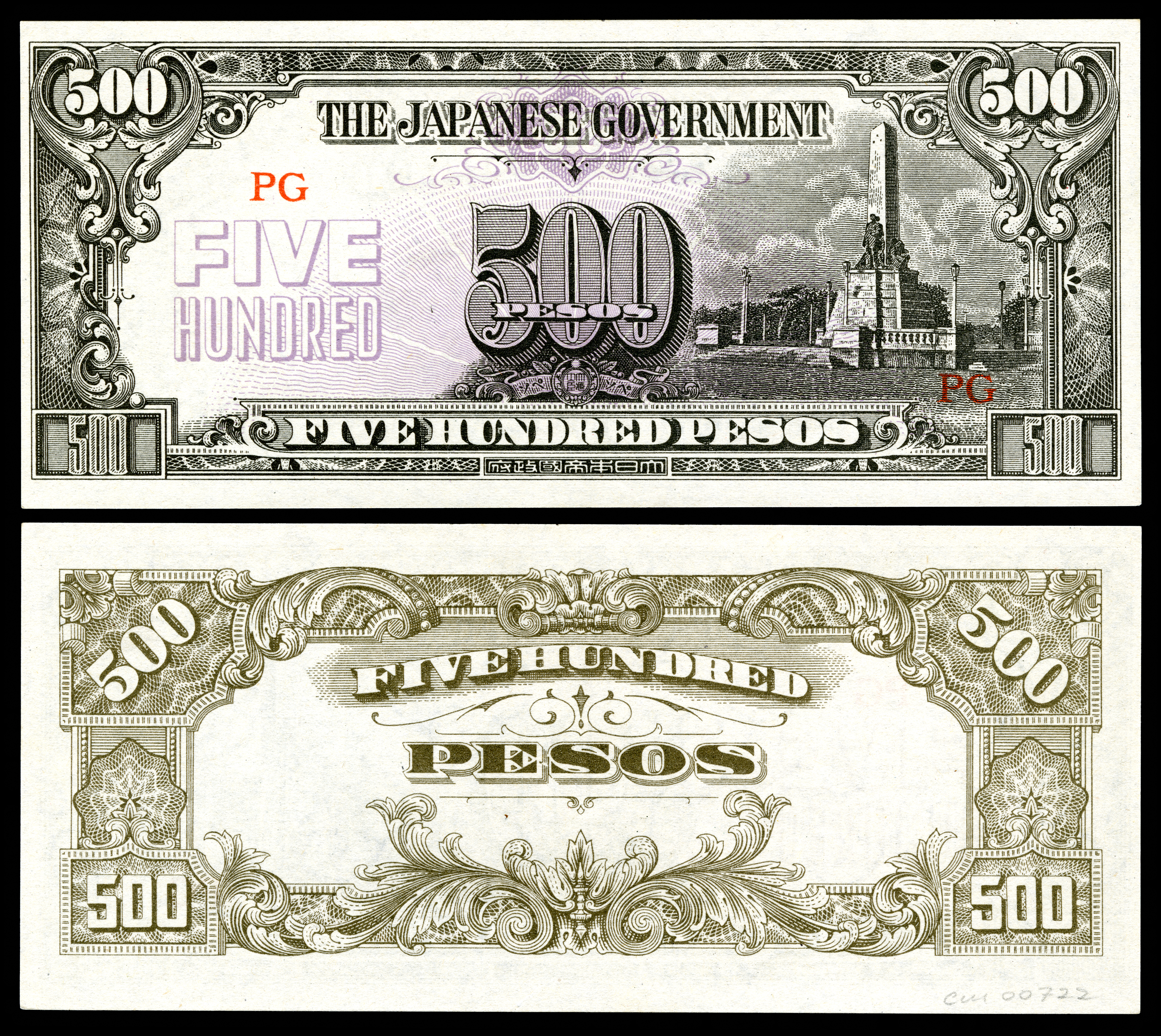
Japanese issued money – Philippines 500 peso notes

The first issue in 1942 consisted of denominations of 1, 5, 10 and 50 centavos and 1, 5, and 10 Pesos. The next year brought "replacement notes" of the 1, 5 and 10 Pesos while 1944 ushered in a 100 peso note and soon after an inflationary 500 peso note. In 1945, the Japanese issued a 1,000 peso note. This set of new money, which was printed even before the war, became known in the Philippines as Mickey Mouse money due to its very low value caused by severe inflation. Anti-Japanese newspapers portrayed stories of going to the market laden with suitcases or "bayong" (native bags made of woven coconut or buri leaf strips) overflowing with the Japanese-issued bills. In 1944, a box of matches cost more than 100 Mickey Mouse pesos. In 1945, a kilogram of camote cost around 1000 Mickey Mouse pesos. Inflation plagued the country with the devaluation of the Japanese money, evidenced by a 60% inflation experienced in January 1944.

=== Education ===
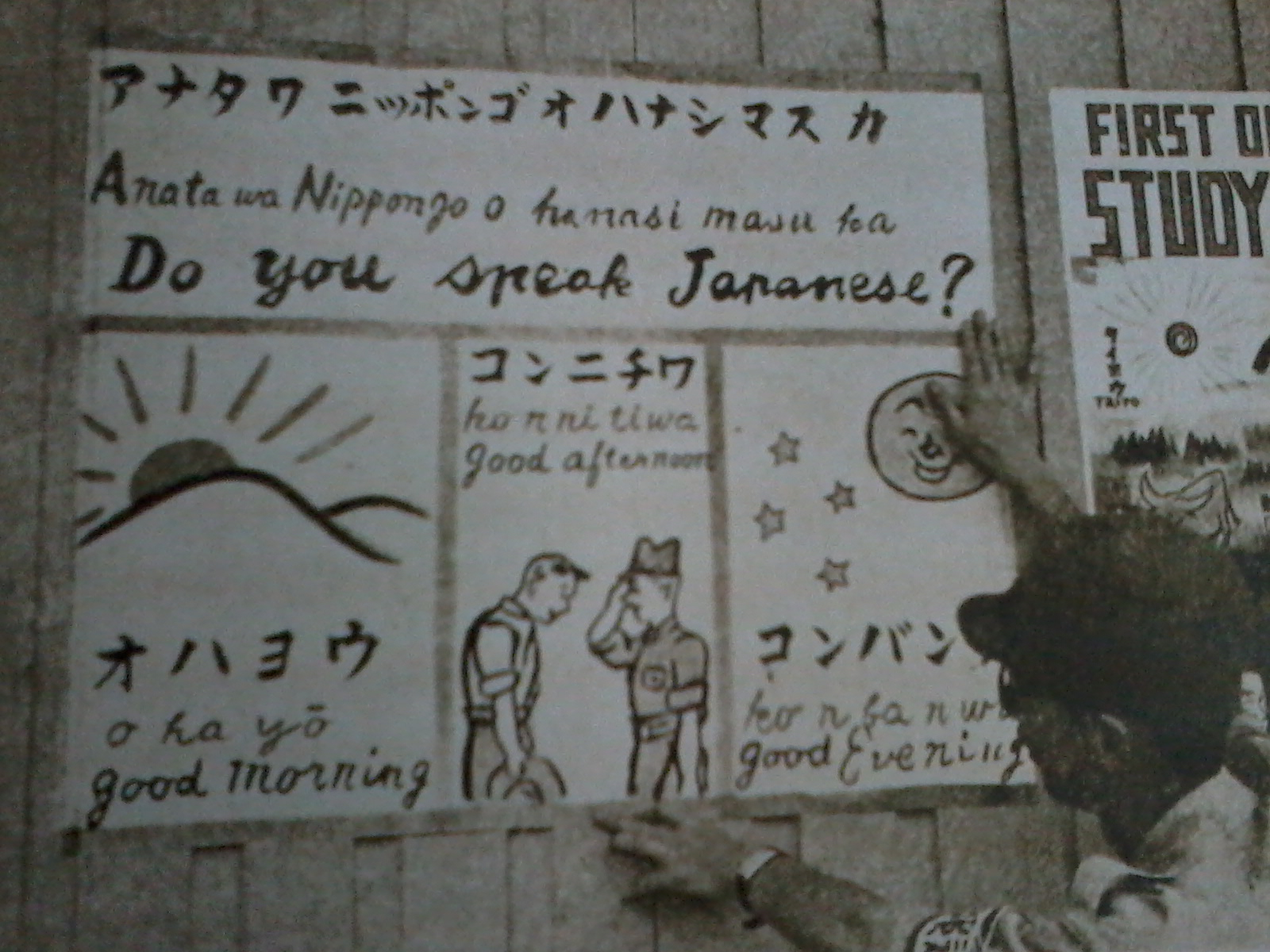
Japanese soldiers posting instructive posters on the Japanese language

The Japanese allowed Tagalog to be the national language of the Philippines. To this end, a pared-down, 1,000-word version of the language was promoted to be learned rapidly by those not yet versed in the language.

Love for labor was encouraged, as seen by the massive labor recruitment programs by the KALIBAPI by mid-1943. Propagation of both Filipino and Japanese cultures were conducted. Schools were reopened, which had an overall number of 300,000 students at its peak.

== End of the Republic ==
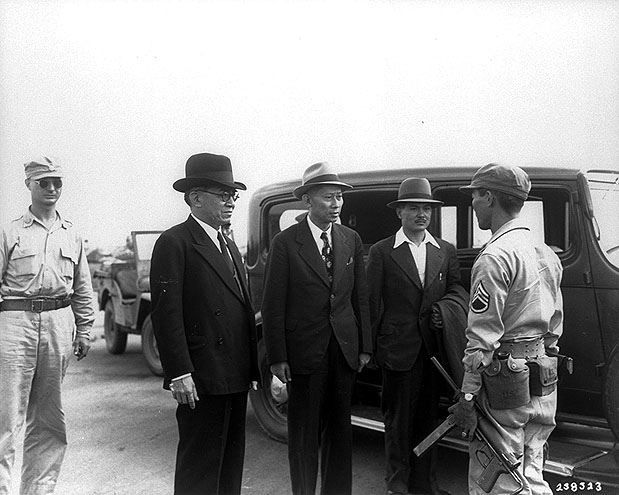
President Laurel, Speaker Aquino, and José Laurel III being taken into U.S. custody at Osaka Airport in 1945

On September 21, 1944, Laurel placed the Republic under martial law. On September 23, 1944, the Republic officially declared war against the United States and United Kingdom. Following the return of American-led Allied forces, the government of the Second Republic evacuated Manila to Baguio. The republic was formally dissolved by Laurel in Tokyo on August 17, 1945 – two days after the surrender of Japan.

== See also ==
- Emergency circulating notes
- Greater East Asia Co-Prosperity Sphere
- Japanese occupation of the Philippines
- Makapili
- Military history of the Philippines during World War II
