= Pledge of Allegiance to the Philippine Flag =

One of two national pledges of the Philippines

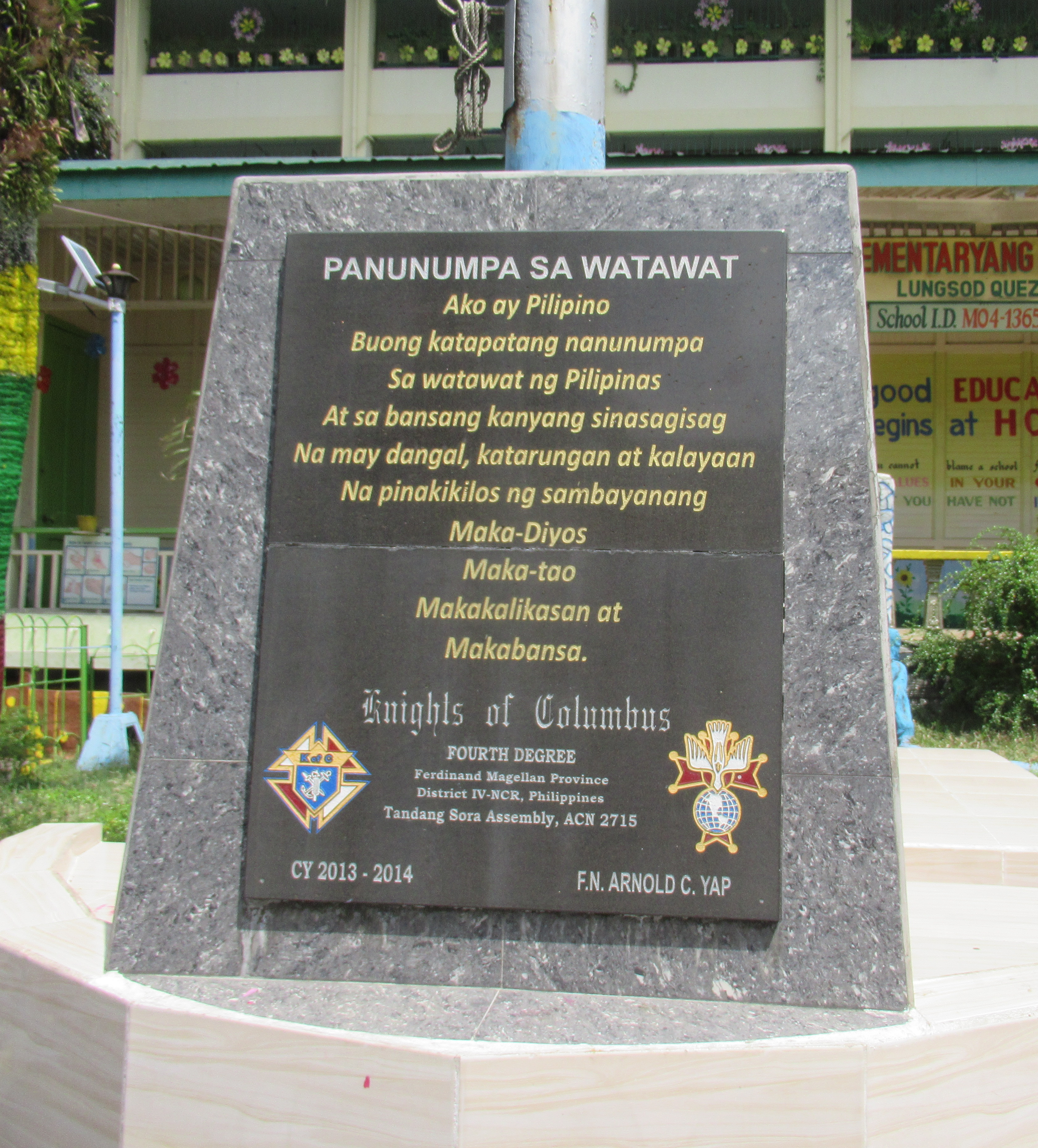
Plaque bearing the text of the pledge installed at the base of the flagpole at the Placido del Mundo Elementary School in Quezon City

The Pledge of Allegiance to the Philippine Flag (Filipino: Panunumpa ng Katapatan sa Watawat ng Pilipinas), or simply the Pledge to the Philippine Flag (Filipino: Panunumpa sa Watawat), is the pledge to the flag of the Philippines. It is one of two national pledges, the other being the Patriotic Oath (Filipino: Panatang Makabayan), which is the Philippine national pledge.

The Pledge of Allegiance to the Philippine Flag is recited at flag ceremonies in schools throughout the Philippines, immediately after the Patriotic Oath or, if the Patriotic Oath is not recited, after the national anthem.

The pledge was legalized under Executive Order No. 343, finalized by the National Commission for Culture and the Arts from a draft prepared by the Commission on the National Language, approved by President Fidel V. Ramos on Independence Day (June 12), 1996, and subsequently by the Flag and Heraldic Code of the Philippines, or Republic Act No. 8491. The law requires the pledge to be recited while standing with the right hand with palm open raised shoulder high. The law makes no statement of what language the pledge must be recited in, but the pledge is written (and therefore recited) in Filipino.

== Text of the pledge ==
Filipino version
English translation

Ako ay Pilipino
Buong katapatang nanunumpa
Sa watawat ng Pilipinas
At sa bansang kanyang sinasagisag
Na may dangal, katarungan at kalayaan
Na pinakikilos ng sambayanang
Maka-Diyos,
Maka-tao,
Makakalikasan, at
Makabansa.

I am a Filipino
I pledge allegiance
To the flag of the Philippines
And to the country it represents
With honor, justice and freedom
That is put in motion by a nation that is
For God, Humanity,
Nature and
Country.

== National motto ==
Chapter III, Section 40 of Republic Act no. 8491, popularly known as the Flag and Heraldic Code of the Philippines, specifies the national motto of the Philippines, which echoes the last four lines of the pledge of allegiance.

Maka-Diyos, Maka-tao, Makakalikasan at Makabansa (For God, People, Nature and Country)

The Philippine motto can also be read as the oath at the Text of the Pledge of Allegiance to the Philippine flag.

== See also ==
- Flag of the Philippines
- Lupang Hinirang
- Panatang Makabayan
- Ebralinag v School Superintendent
