= Religious Instruction Bill =

Proposed legislation

Congress of the Philippines
- Bill citation: House Bill No. 13043
- Introduced by: Representative Miguel Cuenco
- Status: Not passed

The Religious Instruction Bill also known as the Cuenco Bill was a proposed legislation sponsored by House of Representatives member Miguel Cuenco. It was filed as House Bill No. 13043 during the 5th Congress.

The Catholic Church has backed the institutionalizing of optional education of its catechism in public schools in the 1950s. The Department of Education has allowed instructors supplied from the church before. In 1965, Miguel Cuenco filed a bill which would allow public school teachers to teach religion. This bill was likewise backed by the Catholic Church who branded the bill's critics as "enemies of the church". Archbishop Julio Rosales of Cebu has urged president Diosdado Macapagal to endorse the bill at the Senate special session.

Noted opposition to the bill was the Christian denomination Iglesia ni Cristo who views that the Catholic Church could have a monopoly in religious instruction in public education. The INC's opposition was dramatized in the film, Ipakipaglaban ang Pananampalataya.

The bill did not pass.
