= Great Seal of the Philippines =

National seal of the Philippines

- Armiger: Government of the Philippines
- Motto: "Republika ng Pilipinas", "Maka-Diyos, Maka-Tao, Makakalikasan at Makabansa" ("Republic of the Philippines", "For God, People, Nature and Country")
- Badge: Coat of arms of the Philippines surrounded by a double marginal circle where the name of the Philippines in Filipino as well as the country's national motto are inscribed.

The Great Seal of the Philippines (Filipino: Dakilang Sagisag ng Pilipinas) is used to authenticate official documents of the government of the Philippines.

In this context, the word "seal" can mean the tool for pressing marks into paper, or it can mean the mark made by that tool. By law, the President of the Philippines is given custody of the seal.

== Design and usage ==
Republic Act No. 8491 specifies a Great Seal for the Republic of the Philippines:

The Great Seal shall be circular in form. with the same specifications with the national Coat of Arms, surrounding the arms is a double marginal circle which the official name of the Philippines in Filipino was inscribed in. the color of the arms shall not be deemed essential but tincture representation must be used. The Great Seal must also bear the national motto of the Philippines. The Great Seal shall be affixed to or placed upon all commissions signed by the President and upon such other official documents and papers of the Republic of the Philippines as may be provided by law, or as may be required by custom and usage. The President shall have custody of the Great Seal.

== Historical designs ==
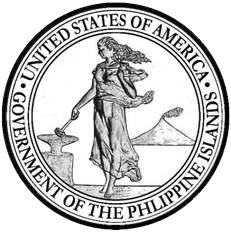
De facto Great Seal of the Philippine Islands (1903–1905)

De jure Great Seal of the Philippine Islands (1905–1935)

Government Seal of the Philippines, 1940–1941

Great Seal of the Second Philippine Republic (1943–1945)

Great Seal of the Republic of the Philippines (1946–1978)

Great Seal of the Republic of the Philippines (1978–1986)

=== Seals of the Philippine Revolutionary states ===
The First Philippine Republic did not employ a single great seal.

=== American period ===
In 1903, a design by Melecio Figueroa, a Filipino engraver, for coinage was adopted for the design of the Great Seal under the United States-administered Insular Government. The seal featured Mayon Volcano and a Filipino woman in Filipiniana attire striking an anvil, surrounded by the text "United States of America, Government of the Philippine Islands". This seal has "never been legally adopted by the Philippine Commission" was supplanted by a design of John R.M. Taylor in 1905, when a new coat of arms was also adopted.

The seal was revised when the Philippine Commonwealth was established in 1935, and the new coat of arms was patterned after the Philippine flag. The seal was composed of the arms inscribed in a circle with the text "United States of America, Commonwealth of the Philippines". President Manuel L. Quezon adopted a new coat of arms and seal in through Executive Order No. 313 on December 23, 1940. The seal was not used despite its official adoption, and the Commonwealth reverted to the 1935 seal on February 23, 1941.

=== Second Philippine Republic ===
The Second Philippine Republic of 1943 to 1945, a puppet state of Imperial Japan, adopted a different seal in October 1943. President Jose P. Laurel issued Republic Act No. 5, which states that the design is a triangular emblem encircled by a double marginal circle. The law dictates the seal to be:

The Great Seal of the Republic of the Philippines shall be circular in form with an equilateral triangle in the middle studded with three five-pointed stars in each corner and emblazoned at the 'center- with the eight-rayed sun, each ray flanked on both sides -by lesser and minor rays; the triangle to be enclosed by another equilateral triangle and between the lines of the two triangles there shall appear on the left side the word 'Kapayapaan,' on the right, 'Kalayaan,' and at the bottom 'Katarungan'; surrounding the whole a double marginal circle within which shall appear the words 'Republika ng Pilipinas' and the figures '1943'

=== Post–World War II ===
After the dissolution of the Philippine Commonwealth and the granting of the full independence of the Philippines by the United States in 1946, a new coat of arms was adopted along with a great seal. The seal was composed of the seal inscribed in a double marginal circle with the text "Republic of the Philippines". The seal had little revisions. In 1978, President Ferdinand Marcos, included the motto "Isang Bansa, Isang Diwa" (“One Nation, One Spirit”) and the inscription of the seal was in Filipino as "Republika ng Pilipinas, Opisyal na Tatak".

== See also ==
- Seal of the president of the Philippines
- Seal of the vice president of the Philippines
- Seal of the Senate of the Philippines
