= Coat of arms of the Philippines =

Versions
- Version with the colonial charges removed, as passed by Congress in 1998. It remains unofficial as no referendum has been called.
- Armiger: Republic of the Philippines
- Adopted: 1946
- Shield: Paleways of two pieces, azure and gules; a chief argent studded with three mullets equidistant from each other; and, in point of honor, ovoid argent over all the sun rayonnant with eight minor and lesser rays
- Compartment: Beneath shall be the scroll with the Name of the Country in Filipino inscribed thereon
- Motto: Republika ng Pilipinas
- Other elements: Bald eagle of the United States and lion rampant of Spain (the charge of the Kingdom of León)

The coat of arms of the Philippines (Filipino: Sagisag ng Pilipinas; Spanish: Escudo de Filipinas) features the eight-rayed sun of the Philippines, each ray representing one of the eight provinces (Batangas, Bulacan, Cavite, Manila, Laguna, Nueva Ecija, Pampanga, and Tarlac) which were placed under martial law by Governor-General Ramón Blanco Sr. during the Philippine Revolution, and three five-pointed stars, each representing one of the three major island groups Luzon, the Visayas, and Mindanao.

On the blue field on the dexter side is the North American bald eagle of the United States, and on the red field on the sinister side is the lion rampant of the coat of arms of the Kingdom of León of Spain, both representing the country's colonial past. The current arms, which share many features of the national flag, were designed by Filipino artist and heraldist Galo Ocampo.

== Blazon ==
The blazon of the coat of arms from Flag and Heraldic Code of the Philippines (Republic Act 8491) is as follows:

...Paleways of two (2) pieces, azure and gules; a chief argent studded with three (3) mullets equidistant from each other; and, in point of honor, ovoid argent over all the sun rayonnant with eight minor and lesser rays. Beneath shall be the scroll with the words "REPUBLIKA NG PILIPINAS", inscribed thereon.

Its original blazoning according to Commonwealth Act No. 731 is:

Pale ways of two pieces, azure and gules; a chief argent studded with three golden stars equidistant from each other; in point of honor, ovoid argent over all the sun rayonnant with eight minor and lesser rays; in sinister base gules, the Lion Rampant of Spain; in dexter base azure, the American eagle displayed proper. Beneath, a scroll with the words 'Republic of the Philippines' inscribed thereon.

== History ==
=== Spanish Colonial Period ===
A depiction of a version of the historical coat of arms of the City of Manila, created by royal decree

The Philippines' codified heraldry when King Philip II of Spain authorized the first coat of arms to the City of Manila through a royal decree issued on 20 March 1596 is, in part, as follows:

"... By these presents I assign, as the special coat-of-arms of the said city of Manila in the Filipinas Islands, a shield which shall have in the center of its upper part a golden castle on a red field, closed by a blue door and windows, and which shall be surmounted by a crown; and in the lower half on a blue field a half lion and half dolphin of silver, armed and langued gules–that is to say, with red nails and tongue. The said lion shall hold in his paw a sword with guard and hilt. ... "

— English translation from Blair and Robertson's The Philippine Islands, 1493–1898

The design of the arms of Manila had changed throughout the years, the castle had adopted various different forms, a crowned sea lion was present later, and in the 19th century, King Ferdinand VII granted the use and placement of the royal crown above the castle itself as an augmentation of honor by royal cedula of April 23, 1826.

Along with this, the lesser arms of the Spanish monarch was used. The design patterned after the national standard of Spain consisted of three fleur-de-lis surrounded by a quartered flag of Castille, represented by two golden castles located on the red field and two red lions on a white field. Minor details of the arms had changed over the years but the basic design elements remained.

=== Revolutionary and Republican Periods ===
During the 1896 Philippine Revolution, Filipino leaders adopted as a common symbol the Baybayin character "ka" (ᜃ) emanating indefinite rays of light. Upon General Emilio Aguinaldo's resumption of the Revolution, the emblem of the triangle with three stars and a mythological sun was adopted as an official symbol, ultimately becoming the coat of arms of the Philippine Republic.

=== American Colonial Period ===
During the American Occupation, a law was enacted prescribing a new coat of arms for the islands. The Spanish-era arms of the City of Manila were used until 1905, when the Philippine Commission adopted the "new arms and great seal of the Philippine Islands" designed by Gaillard Hunt of the US State Department. It consisted of thirteen alternating red-and-white stripes representing the Thirteen Colonies; a chief blue above, the honor color, and over them in an oval the arms of Manila with the castle of Spain and the sea lion prominently displayed. It also bore as its crest an American eagle, the symbol of United States. Beneath the shield was the scroll with the words Philippine Islands. It remained unaltered until the inauguration of Commonwealth of the Philippines in 1935.

=== Commonwealth Era ===
During the Commonwealth, extensive reform was made to the government in preparation for Philippine independence. One of major changes was changing the symbol for Filipinos. "The Arms and Great Seal of the Commonwealth Government of the Philippines" was approved in 1935, the number of stripes reduced from thirteen to two and three five-pointed stars added. The sea lion was made gold instead of silver and the eagle was slightly enlarged and placed closer to the arm. The word Commonwealth of the Philippines replaced Philippine Islands in the scroll below; it also incorporated the modified coat of arms of the City of Manila.

On December 15, 1938, President Manuel L. Quezon created the Special Committee of Arms of the Philippines. After almost two years of study, the committee recommended certain modifications to the coat of arms of the Commonwealth of the Philippines. They recommended that the eight-ray Philippine sun must be the point of honor. It was revised in 1940. It featured two stripes, blue on the sinister (left) side and red on the dexter (right) side of the shield; a white field above, studded with three five-pointed stars equidistant from each other; over them, the eight-rayed sun with each ray flanked on both sides by minor rays inside an oval. On the crest is the American eagle, its talon grasping an olive branch with eight leaves and eight fruits, and the left talon grasping three spears. Beneath the shield was the scroll with the inscription Philippines.

After providing the various branches of the government with their own symbols, President Quezon created the Philippine Heraldic Committee in 1940. The committee was assigned the studying and recommending the designs and symbolism for official seals of Philippines' political subdivision, cities, and government institutions.

The 1941 coat of arms was short-lived and the 1938 iteration of the symbol was restored. Both symbols were also used as a presidential symbol through executive orders.

The heraldic work of the committee was suspended during the Pacific War.

=== Second Philippine Republic ===
During the Second Philippine Republic, a more nationalistic policy were adopted and the seal was revised. Foreign components of the Filipino heraldic symbol which previously represented its colonial links to Spain and United States were removed. Instead, salient features of the flag and seal of the short-lived Philippine Republic were incorporated, consisting of the eight-ray mythological sun and three stars located beneath the equilateral triangle. Written within three sets of two marginal lines of the three sides of the triangle were Kalayaan, Kapayapaan, Katarungan (Liberty, Peace, Justice). Around the seal was a double marginal circle within which was written Republika ng Pilipinas (Republic of the Philippines).

=== Post World War II and full independence ===
After World War II, President Sergio Osmeña reactivated the Philippine Heraldic Committee. The current design pursuant to Commonwealth Act No. 731 was approved by the Congress of the Philippines on July 3, 1946. It was designed by Captain Galo B. Ocampo, Secretary of the Philippine Heraldry Committee.

During the administration of President Ferdinand Marcos, Isang Bansa, Isang Diwa (One Nation, One Spirit) became the national motto of the Philippines. It was immediately incorporated into the national seal, replacing the words Republic of the Philippines, which were originally inscribed in a scroll beneath the arms. The decree for this purpose was approved by the Office of the President on June 9, 1978. However, during the administration of President Corazon Aquino in 1986, the decree was revoked and reinstated the full English name of the country. The Administrative Code of 1987 provided that the inscription on the scroll could also be rendered in the national language.

The original English words were replaced by its Filipino translation, Republika ng Pilipinas, pursuant to Republic Act No. 8491 on February 12, 1998, coinciding with the centennial of the Philippine declaration of independence.

== Chronology ==
=== Spanish East Indies ===
During the Spanish colonial period, the lesser arms of the Spanish Sovereign were used. The seal of Manila was also issued under royal decree by Philip II (for whom the islands were named) in 1596. Note that the Pillars of Hercules or the Golden Fleece were not always displayed and the arms themselves were sometimes solely used.

Image	Description	Year/Period	Legal basis
Spanish East Indies (1565–1898)
	Arms under the House of Habsburg.	1565–1580	
	The Habsburg arms, with half-arches added to the crown.	1580–1668	
	Same arms, with crown's arches bent.	1668–1700	
	Arms under the House of Bourbon.	1700–1868; 1874–1898	
	Arms of the Provisional Government and the First Spanish Republic; royal crown replaced with mural crown and inescutcheon with Bourbon Arms removed.	1868–1870; 1873–1874	
	Inescutcheon shows arms of the House of Savoy during the brief reign of Amadeo I.	1871–1873	

Image	Description	Legal basis
Captaincy General of the Philippines (1565–1898)
	Lesser coat of arms of the Captaincy General of the Philippines	
	Middle coat of arms of the Captaincy General of the Philippines	
	Greater coat of arms of the Captaincy General of the Philippines	

=== First Philippine Republic ===
After the expulsion of the Spanish colonial government by the Philippine Revolutionary Army and the promulgation of the Malolos Constitution, the First Philippine Republic continued to use the emblem of the triangle with the sun and stars.

Image	Description	Year/Period	Legal basis
First Philippine Republic (1898–1901)
	Emblem of the Philippine Republic, the independent sovereign state established in Filipino-controlled Philippines. It shows an equilateral triangle in the center of which is the sun with eight rays and at each angle a five-pointed star. Used by the national government until its collapse with the capture of President Emilio Aguinaldo in 1901 during the Philippine-American War.	1898–1901	Malolos Constitution

=== Commonwealth and Second world war eras ===
After the signing of the 1898 Treaty of Paris that ended the Spanish–American War, Spain ceded control of the Philippines and several other possessions to the United States of America. The following arms were used in the period after the cession, during the Commonwealth, and throughout the Second World War.

Image	Description	Year/Period	Legal basis
American period (1898–1946)
	Coat of arms of the Philippine Islands designed by Gaillard Hunt. Used by the Insular Government, which reported to the U.S. Bureau of Insular Affairs. The banderole bore the words "Philippine Islands".	1905–1935	Act No. 1365
	First version of the Commonwealth arms, used by the Commonwealth of the Philippines. First used under President Manuel Quezon, it was also used by the Philippine government-in-exile when the country was occupied by Japan during the Second World War. This version had the sea-lion change tincture from Argent to Or, while the banderole was revised to read "Commonwealth of the Philippines". After World War II, the Commonwealth retained its coat of arms, which was used until the dissolution of the Commonwealth.	1935–1940	Act No. 4258
	Short-lived second version of the Commonwealth arms, approved on August 19, 1940, under Commonwealth Act No. 602. Its use was not widespread and the previous arms were restored on February 23, 1941, by Commonwealth Act No. 614.	1940–1941	Commonwealth Act No. 602
	The restored first version of the coat of arms. It was also used by the Philippine government-in-exile when the country was occupied by Japan during the Second World War.	1941–1946	Commonwealth Act No. 614
Japanese period (1942–1945)
	Emblem of the Second Philippine Republic.	1943–1945	Act No. 5
	Coat of arms of the Second Philippine Republic. Introduced by the Japanese puppet state's government. The inscription on the banderole was "Pilipinas" (Philippines). The left side of shield is red while the right side is blue as per Act No. 17. Adopted on December 24, 1943.	1943–1945	Act No. 17

=== Sovereignty ===
The following were used upon the Islands' achievement of full sovereignty in 1946. The arms as designed by Galo Ocampo have retained their basic design since, with only minor alterations made due to political and cultural considerations.

Image	Description	Year/Period	Legal basis
Sovereignty (since 1946)
	Arms of the then-newly independent Republic of the Philippines, used throughout the Third Republic and the early Fourth Republic. Prior to 1955, the shade of blue used in the coat of arms was said to be similar to that of the United States flag. Following the recommendations submitted by the Philippine Heraldry Committee in 1955, the colors of the flag were standardized and the shade of blue adopted by the Philippine Heraldry Committee was TCCA Cable No. 70077 also known in the Philippines as "National Flag Blue". The same color specifications was applied to the coat of arms.	1946–1978	Commonwealth Act No. 731
	In 1978, President Ferdinand Marcos changed the inscription to the national motto at the time, Isang Bansa, Isang Diwa (One Nation, One Spirit).	1978–1985	Presidential Decree No. 1413, s. 1978
	In 1985, the shade of blue was changed from "National Flag Blue" (Cable No. 80077) standardized in 1955 to "Oriental Blue" (Cable No. 80176), the same change was made on the flag of the Philippines.	1985–1986	Executive Order No. 1010, s. 1985
	The pre-1978 coat of arms was restored on September 10, 1986, by Memorandum Order No. 34 following the 1986 People Power Revolution. The scroll bore the country's official name in English. The Administrative Code of 1987 provided that the inscription on the scroll could also be rendered in the national language. Upon the changes of its coat of arms in 1998, the name of the country at the scroll is shown in Filipino.	1986–1998	Memorandum Order No. 34, s. 1986
	The arms according to the never-ratified Flag and Heraldic Code of the Philippines (Republic Act 8491). The scroll's inscription bears the country's official name in Filipino, Republika ng Pilipinas (Republic of the Philippines), and the lion and eagle charges have been removed. These unofficial arms remain unused since the referendum legally required to ratify them has not been called.	none	Republic Act 8491
	The version of the Arms in use. The banderole bears the country's official name in Filipino, Republika ng Pilipinas (Republic of the Philippines), slightly lighter shades of blue and red are used on the shield, and the American and Spanish symbols are included.	from 1998	

== In sport ==
A stylized form of the arms was formerly used on the jersey of the Philippine men's national basketball team (until 2012), and appears with the word "Pilipinas" emblazoned above it. In addition, many coats of arms of national and private institutions, as well as Philippine towns and cities, are inspired by the national coat of arms.

== See also ==
- Flag of the Philippines
- Great Seal of the Philippines
