= Patriotic Oath (Philippines) =

One of two national pledges of the Philippines

The Patriotic Oath (Tagalog: Panatang Makabayan) is one of two national pledges of the Philippines, the other being the Pledge of Allegiance to the Flag (Tagalog: Panunumpa ng Katapatan sa Watawat). It is commonly recited at flag ceremonies of schools—especially public schools—immediately after singing the Philippine national anthem but before reciting the Pledge of Allegiance to the Flag.

== Custom ==
Recitation of the Panatà is required by law at all public and private educational institutions. By custom, this is observed in institutions meant for Filipinos or containing a majority of Filipino nationals. This guideline was set in Republic Act No. 1265, one of many national symbols laws, which was approved on July 11, 1955. The act was implemented in schools through Department Order No. 8 of what is now the Department of Education, which was approved on July 21, 1955. the Tagalog version of the pledge was derived by the original English version known as "Partriotic Oath" penned in 1935, it was later translated by Benjamín Trinidad. The Panatà was revised in November 9, 2001 by then-Secretary of Education Raúl Roco, using shorter lines in less formal Tagalog. The oath was revised again on February 14, 2023 by Vice-President and then-Secretary of Education Sara Duterte replacing the word "nagdárasál" to "nananálangin".

Although Department Order No. 8 states that the Panatà may be recited in English or any Philippine language, the Panatà is now almost always recited in Tagalog, of which two versions exist: the current text is Roco’s shorter version of the English original, the older being the more direct translation by Trinidad.

== Text ==
Original Official Tagalog version

=== Panatang Makabayan ===
Iniibig ko ang Pilipinas.
Ito ang aking lupang sinilangan.
Ito ang tahanan ng aking lahi.
Ako'y kanyang kinukupkop at tinutulungan
Upang maging malakas, maligaya at kapakipakinabang.
Bilang ganti, ay diringgin ko ang payo ng aking mga magulang,
Susundin ko ang mga tuntunin ng aking paaralan,
Tutuparin ko ang mga tungkulin ng isang mamamayang makabayan at masunurin sa batas.
Paglilingkuran ko ang aking bayan nang walang pag-iimbot at ng buong katapatan,
Sisikapin kong maging isang tunay na Pilipino sa isip, sa salita, at sa gawa.

Original English translation

=== Patriotic Oath ===
I love the Philippines.
It is the land of my birth.
It is the home of my people.
It protects and aids me,
to be strong, happy, and trustworthy.
In return, I will heed the counsel of my parents,
I shall obey the rules of my school,
I will fulfill the duties of a patriotic, law-abiding citizen;
I will serve my country with selflessness and utter fidelity.
I will do my best to be a true Filipino in thought, word, and deed.

Official Tagalog version (DepEd Order 054, s. 2001)

=== Panatang Makabayan ===
Iniibig ko ang Pilipinas,
aking lupang sinilangan,
tahanan ng aking lahi;
kinukupkop ako at tinutulungang
maging malakas, masipag at marangal.
Dahil mahal ko ang Pilipinas,
diringgin ko ang payo
ng aking mga magulang,
susundin ko ang tuntunin ng paaralan,
tutuparin ko ang tungkulin
ng mamamayang makabayan:
naglilingkod, nag-aaral at nagdarasal
nang buong katapatan.
Iaalay ko ang aking buhay,
pangarap, pagsisikap
sa bansang Pilipinas.

Revised and amended Tagalog version (DepEd Order 004 s. 2023)

=== Panatang Makabayan ===
Iniibig ko ang Pilipinas,
aking lupang sinilangan,
tahanan ng aking lahi;
kinukupkop ako at tinutulungang
maging malakas, masipag at marangal.
Dahil mahal ko ang Pilipinas,
diringgin ko ang payo
ng aking mga magulang,
susundin ko ang tuntunin ng paaralan,
tutuparin ko ang tungkulin
ng mamamayang makabayan;
naglilingkod, nag-aaral at nananalangin
nang buong katapatan.
Iaalay ko ang aking buhay,
pangarap, pagsisikap
sa bansang Pilipinas.

Unofficial English translation (Raul Roco)

=== Patriotic Oath ===
I love the Philippines,
my land of birth,
home of my race.
I am protected by it and aided
to become strong, industrious and honorable.
Since I love the Philippines,
I shall heed the counsel of my parents,
I shall obey the rules of my school,
I shall fulfill the duties of a patriotic citizen,
serving, studying, and praying with utter fidelity.
I offer my life, dreams, and striving
to the Philippine nation

== 1993 Jehovah's Witnesses expulsion controversy ==
In 1993, a controversy erupted when 70 adherents of the Christian sect Jehovah's Witnesses: 68 students and two teachers, were expelled and fired respectively from five schools in Cebu for their failure to salute the flag, sing the Philippine National Anthem, and recite the patriotic oath. According to Jehovah's Witnesses teachings, flag ceremonies, flag salutes, and patriotic oaths are viewed as acts of worship or religious devotion, the latter two of which they believe can only be rendered to God alone and not to a person or an object. The same sect also upholds the teaching that flags of countries are considered as images; the act of honoring an image being constituted as idolatry.

The Cebu Division Superintendent argued in a court hearing that the students and the teacher violated Republic Act No. 1265, the law making the flag ceremony compulsory for all schools, citing the case of Gerona et al v. Secretary of Education. The superintendent also argued separation of church and state, stating the flag is devoid of religious significance and does not involve any religious ceremony, and that giving the JWs right to exemption would disrupt school discipline and demoralize the rest of the school population, which by far constitutes the great majority.

Evidence showed that none of the aggrieved parties engaged in "external acts" or behavior that would offend the people who believe in expressing their love of country through the observance of the flag ceremony even if they did not take part in the compulsory flag ceremony, having only quietly stood at attention during the event to show their respect for the right of those who choose to participate in the solemn proceedings.

The Court ruled in favor of the expelled students and the fired teachers on the grounds that expulsion due to religious beliefs is invalid, explaining the importance of freedom of religion in the Philippines in an opinion written by justice Carolina Griño-Aquino:

Religious freedom is a fundamental right which is entitled to the highest priority and the amplest protection among human rights, for it involves the relationship of man to his Creator. [...] The right to religious profession and worship has a two-fold aspect, vis., freedom to believe and freedom to act on one's belief. The first is absolute as long as the belief is confined within the realm of thought. The second is subject to regulation where the belief is translated into external acts that affect the public welfare. [...] The sole justification for a prior restraint or limitation on the exercise of religious freedom [...] is the existence of a grave and present danger of a character both grave and imminent, of a serious evil to public safety, public morals, public health or any other legitimate public interest, that the State has a right (and duty) to prevent.

The students were later allowed to re-enroll in the school they were expelled from, and the teachers were allowed to resume their duties.

== See also ==
- Flag of the Philippines
