= Isang Bansa, Isang Diwa =

National motto of the Philippines (1978–1986)

The coat of arms of the Philippines from 1978 to 1985, during which "Isang Bansa, Isang Diwa" appeared on the banderole.

Isang Bansa, Isang Diwa (Filipino for "One Nation, One Spirit") was the national motto of the Philippines from 1978 to 1986, during the presidency of President Ferdinand Marcos. It was adopted on June 9, 1978 by virtue of Presidential Decree No. 1413. The motto has been criticized and has been denounced as "the slogan of a fascist regime".

== History ==
"Isang Bansa, Isang Diwa" was adopted on June 9, 1978 by virtue of Presidential Decree No. 1413, a key element in Marcos's vision of building his "New Society". When the new motto was finally unveiled three days later on Independence Day during the 1978 State of the Nation Address, Marcos claimed that it was imperative for the nation to build a united though diverse political community.

It shall remain the paramount concern of our government to unite our country behind the cause of justice and dignity, to lift those who live in conditions of poverty, ignorance and lack of opportunity, so that together they may form one united political community. And regardless of differences in our views, we shall strive to be one nation, in which one will be free to disagree with another without undermining national unity. We shall be a nation with one purpose, no matter how differently individuals express themselves.

The precise meaning and rationale of "Isang Bansa, Isang Diwa" remains disputed, although it has been argued that the motto was part and parcel of the state's projection of its political power towards building the New Society, especially with the imposition of Martial Law in 1972. The motto in turn arguably embodied the New Society's cultural consciousness, developed in part through First Lady Imelda Marcos's socio-cultural projects. It was incorporated into the national coat of arms, and even a patriotic song from the period, Ako ay Pilipino ("I am Filipino") by George Canseco, incorporated the new motto in its chorus.

=== Abolition and present-day use ===
Following Marcos's ouster in the People Power Revolution, "Isang Bansa, Isang Diwa" was abolished by his successor, Corazon Aquino, on September 10, 1986 by virtue of Memorandum Order No. 34, which revoked the decree making the motto official. Public usages of the motto were quickly removed thereafter; for example, the motto was dropped from the coat of arms with the passage of the Administrative Code of 1987, replaced simply with the country’s official English name, “Republic of the Philippines”. The Philippines would not have another national motto until 1998, when the current motto, "Maka-Diyos, Maka-tao, Makakalikasan at Makabansa" ("For God, People, Nature and Country") was adopted under Republic Act No. 8491 (the Flag and Heraldic Code of the Philippines), promulgated during the presidency of Fidel V. Ramos.

Despite its abolition, unofficial use of the motto has persisted. "Isang Bansa, Isang Diwa" has been invoked in the speeches of prominent politicians and government officials, including Mayor of Manila Isko Moreno, Presidential Spokesperson Harry Roque, and Philippine ambassador to Switzerland Denis Lepatan, while presidential candidate Eddie Gil used it for the name of his political party in the 2004 Philippine presidential election. The motto has also been referenced in a song about the rehabilitation of Marawi, and is also invoked by persons and groups who remain loyal to Ferdinand Marcos, even being used by Marcos' son, Bongbong Marcos, to forward his own political ambitions.

== Reception ==
"Isang Bansa, Isang Diwa" has been criticized and denounced as being "the slogan of a fascist regime".

Architect and author Gerard Lico claims that the motto builds on a narrative of national palingenesis or rebirth, with the motto being seen as the culmination of the Marcoses' desire to build a single national identity that ultimately centered around their cult of personality. Meanwhile, Dr. Michael Tan, Chancellor of the University of the Philippines Diliman, criticized the motto for embodying a predominantly Catholic, Tagalophone monocultural national identity that came at the expense of the country's other religions, ethnic groups and languages. The Tagalophone aspect of this identity was further criticized by Philippine Star columnist Bobit Avila, who claimed that the motto embodied poorly executed Jacobinist thought.

The motto however is not without its defenders. Columnist Kitch Ortego, writing in the Manila Standard, invoked "Isang Bansa, Isang Diwa" as being representative of a former culture of consensus in Philippine politics, while former Senator and Marcos-era Information Minister Francisco Tatad, writing in the Manila Times, claimed that the motto was unfairly victimized by Corazon Aquino administration's vilification of Marcos's achievements — part of a larger claim that he makes accusing her, former Senator Benigno Aquino Jr. and their son, President Benigno Aquino III, of being overly vindictive towards Marcos and his family.
