= Freedom of religion in the Philippines =

Freedom of religion in the Philippines is guaranteed by the Constitution of the Philippines.

In 2024, Freedom House scored the country 4 out of 4 for religious freedom.

== Background ==
The 1987 Constitution of the Philippines declares: The separation of Church and State shall be inviolable. (Article II, Section 6), and, No law shall be made respecting an establishment of religion, or prohibiting the free exercise thereof. The free exercise and enjoyment of religious profession and worship, without discrimination or preference, shall forever be allowed. No religious test shall be required for the exercise of civil or political rights. (Article III, Section 5).....

The Supreme Court of the Philippines, ruling in 2003 and 2006 in the landmark case of Estrada vs. Escritor, established the doctrine of benevolent neutrality-accommodation. The 2006 ruling, penned by former Chief Justice Puno, explained benevolent-neutrality in the context of U.S. jurisprudence as follows:

Under the benevolent-neutrality theory, the principle underlying the First Amendment is that freedom to carry out one’s duties to a Supreme Being is an inalienable right, not one dependent on the grace of legislature. Religious freedom is seen as a substantive right and not merely a privilege against discriminatory legislation. With religion looked upon with benevolence and not hostility, benevolent neutrality allows accommodation of religion under certain circumstances.

The ruling went on to cite a U.S. Supreme Court decision which had held that if prohibiting the exercise of religion is merely the incidental effect of a generally applicable and otherwise valid provision, the First Amendment has not been offended. Though concurring in the decision, Justice O'Connor dissented strongly from the rationale, arguing that a compelling state interest test should have been applied.

Echoing Justice O'Connor's point from the U.S. case, the ruling in Estrada vs. Escritor went on to quote her as having said that strict scrutiny is appropriate for free exercise challenges because “[t]he compelling interest test reflects the First Amendment’s mandate of preserving religious liberty to the fullest extent possible in a pluralistic society.

The ruling then declared Underlying the compelling state interest test is the notion that free exercise is a fundamental right and that laws burdening it should be subject to strict scrutiny, and summarized a three-part compelling state interest test by quoting Michael W. McConnell as follows:

If the plaintiff can show that a law or government practice inhibits the free exercise of his religious beliefs, the burden shifts to the government to demonstrate that the law or practice is necessary to the accomplishment of some important (or ‘compelling’) secular objective and that it is the least restrictive means of achieving that objective. If the plaintiff meets this burden and the government does not, the plaintiff is entitled to exemption from the law or practice at issue. In order to be protected, the claimant’s beliefs must be ‘sincere’, but they need not necessarily be consistent, coherent, clearly articulated, or congruent with those of the claimant’s religious denomination. ‘Only beliefs rooted in religion are protected by the Free Exercise Clause’; secular beliefs, however sincere and conscientious, do not suffice.

The ruling noted that the then-current prevailing view under U.S. law is that there are no required accommodation under the First Amendment, although it permits of legislative accommodations. Considering Philippine jurisprudence, though, the ruling said:

By juxtaposing the American Constitution and jurisprudence against that of the Philippines, it is immediately clear that one cannot simply conclude that we have adopted—lock, stock and barrel—the religion clauses as embodied in the First Amendment, and therefore, the U.S. Court’s interpretation of the same. Unlike in the U.S. where legislative exemptions of religion had to be upheld by the U.S. Supreme Court as constituting permissive accommodations, similar exemptions for religion are mandatory accommodations under our own constitutions.

These landmark decisions in Estrada vs. Escritor established that benevolent neutrality-accommodation is the framework by which free exercise cases must be decided in the Philippines. This amounts to a requirement that any law which conflicts with a violator's sincerely held religious beliefs must pass a strict scrutiny test in order to be enforceable.

== History ==
By passing through the numerous phases of colonial occupation, the relationship between religion and government in the Philippines has repeatedly changed. The country had close ties between the Catholic Church and the government during the Spanish colonial period from 1565 to 1898. The American concept of separation of church and state was introduced during the American colonial period in the Philippine Constitution of 1899 and remains a part of the Philippine constitution today.

=== Spanish colonial period ===
Beginning with the Catholization of most of the Philippines in the 16th century, political power was shared by the Catholic Church and the Spanish civil authorities. The Filipino Jesuit historian Horacio de la Costa mentions that the rules governing the cooperation of the two entities was set in the Patronato Real de las Indias, a combination of law and jurisprudence that governed the delicate relationship of the Holy See and the Spanish monarchy regarding colonial affairs. In the agreements, the Catholic clergy gave the Spanish monarchy the responsibility of promoting, maintaining, and defending Catholicism in... all Spanish dominions overseas ^{(1)}. In return, the Spanish were permitted to exercise numerous rights to autonomously govern the colonial Catholic Church virtually independent of Roman jurisdiction. On the other hand, Teodoro Agoncillo, a Filipino historian from the University of the Philippines, mentions that the collaboration enabled the Spanish to readily subjugate the Indios (natives of the Philippines) by a potent combination of secular and religious might. The successful Legazpi conquest of the Philippines in 1565 recognized the power of clergy by bringing along the Augustinian friar, navigator and priest Andrés de Urdaneta, to help control the natives. Other Spanish rulers acknowledged the importance of clergy. A Mexican viceroy (quoted in Agoncillo) said that in each friar in the Philippines, they had a captain and a whole army. However, Church involvement had numerous ill effects, as anti-friar Marcelo H. del Pilar of the late 19th century complains: "... the friars control all the fundamental forces of society in the Philippines. They control the educational system, for they own the University of Santo Tomás, and are the local inspectors of every primary school. They control the minds of the people because in a dominantly Catholic country, the parish rectors can utilize the pulpit and confessionals to publicly or secretly influence the people."

In-fighting continued and reached its peak when the Gomburza, a triad of priests composed of Mariano Gómez, José Burgos, and Jacinto Zamora, were executed by civil authorities in 1872 after being implicated in the failed Cavite Mutiny in that same year. Popular discontent ensued, leading to the Philippine Revolution some twenty years later. The Spanish were unable to cope with multiple uprisings since their limited military was overextended. Bereft of the civil protection, clerics were at their most vulnerable. Rather than accept change, numerous friars "handled the Mausers and Remingtons when the tide of battle was going against the colonial government". As the status quo was being changed, the ties between Church and State began to fall apart.

Filipino nationalists in 1898 framed a constitution for an independent Philippine republic. There were heated discussions on the provision on state and religion. Felipe Calderón presented his draft proposal calling for Catholicism to be made the state religion. According to Jesuit historian John Schumacher, Calderón then attacked the position of Apolinario Mabini, who had insisted on the separation of church and state. The Calderón proposal, however, was defeated by a single vote, and the provision was finally passed. The Malolos Constitution thus stated in Article 5:

The State recognizes the freedom and equality of all religions, as well as the separation of Church and State.

=== American period ===
Spain ceded the Philippines to the United States in 1898. By the end of February 1902, American forces had defeated the Philippine forces seeking to establish an independent Philippine republic. The Philippine Organic Act of 1902 provided, among other things, "That no law shall be made respecting an establishment of religion or prohibiting the free exercise thereof, and that the free exercise and enjoyment of religious profession and worship, without discrimination or preference, shall forever be allowed."

Historian Schumacher cites that William Howard Taft, the head of the Second Philippine Commission and the first civil Governor-General of the Philippine Islands, was very much aware of the need to defuse anti-friar feeling throughout the Islands. He requested the Spanish friars be given leave of their parish posts. Many of the friars left voluntarily, and were replaced by native Filipino priests in the lower ranks and American bishops comprising the episcopacy. Negotiations also began for the compulsory sale of vast Church holdings. Although the sale was affected by pressure from influential sectors like some bishops and certain delegates, it achieved Taft's goal of sequestering all lands owned by the Catholic Church, something that the ill-fated Philippine Republic had failed to achieve. After taking the land, Taft intended to redistribute the land. This not only reduced the financial position of the Catholic Church, but also diminished the influential clout it had during the Spanish colonial period.

American jurisprudence reintroduced separation of church and state, relying on the First Amendment and the metaphor of Thomas Jefferson on the wall of separation... between church and state ^{(10)}, but the Philippine experience has shown that this theoretical wall of separation has been crossed several times by secular authorities. Schumacher states that in 1906, the Supreme Court of the Philippines intervened in the issue of parish ownership by returning assets seized by the Philippine Independent Church during the Revolution, while certain charitable organizations managed or influenced by the Catholic Church were either returned or sequestered.

=== Commonwealth era ===
The provision of the 1935 charter on religion mimicked the First Amendment to the United States Constitution, but the sentences

The free exercise and enjoyment of religious profession and worship, without discrimination or preference, shall be forever allowed. No religious test shall be required for the exercise of civil or political rights were appended and this section became the basis for the non-establishment of religion and freedom of religion in the Philippines.

=== Post-colonial era ===
With the guarantee of religious freedom in the Philippines, the Catholic clergy subsequently remained in the political background as a source of moral influence for many voters during elections, which continues to exert influence to the present day. Political candidates generally court the clergy for support, although this does not guarantee victory for a candidate. The Philippines was placed under martial law by President Ferdinand Marcos and relations changed dramatically, as some bishops opposed the martial law.

=== Marcos era ===
A new constitution was ratified in 1973 which included the separation of church and state clause, signaling a new development in the body of law on religious affairs. Joaquin Bernas, a Filipino Jesuit specializing in constitutional law, acknowledges that there were complex issues that were brought to court and numerous attempts to use the separation of Church and State against the Catholic Church, but he defends the statement, saying that the fact that he [Marcos] tried to do it does not deny the validity of the separation of church and state.

Sharia District Courts (SDCs) and Sharia Circuit Courts (SCCs) were created in 1977 through Presidential Decree 1083, which is also known as the Code of Muslim Personal Laws. Islamic law only applies to civil cases involving all Muslims nationwide. Cases are handled in the Autonomous Region in Muslim Mindanao and a couple of Mindanao provinces that are not part of ARMM by both sharia district and circuit courts, organised into five sharia districts. Outside these areas, sharia-related cases are processed in civil courts under a session from the five sharia districts. All other cases, including criminal ones, are dealt with by local civil courts.

The Catholic Church was instrumental in winning support for Corazon Aquino who replaced Marcos as president with Cardinal Sin calling for support. Aquino then initiated a new constitutional commission to frame a new charter again for the country. It is noted that Roman Catholic religious and clergy like Christine Tan, R.G.S., a nun, Joaquin Bernas, S.J., and Bishop Teodoro C. Bacani became part of the 1986 Constitutional Commission and left their mark on the promulgation of the charter and its numerous provisions on the Church and state.

=== Contemporary history ===
The CBCP was embroiled in a controversy in 2011 over millions of pesos in donations from the Philippine Charity Sweepstakes Office (PCSO) at the behest of then president Gloria Macapagal Arroyo. According to a Commission on Audit report in 2009, some bishops received donations for the purchase of vehicles from the PCSO. Critics claim the donations was given to ensure Church support for Arroyo, who was then buffeted by scandals and repeated threats of impeachment. The bishops were summoned during the Senate Blue Ribbon Committee investigation on the anomalies within the PCSO, with the bishops returning the vehicles donated to them. Senator Teofisto Guingona, chairman of the committee, said that since the vehicles were used for secular purposes, the donation is not considered as a violation of the Constitution, but added that the issue was a "litmus test to the Constitution" since the Constitution prohibits favoring a particular religious organization.

The Muslim population faces discrimination, mainly in the area of employment, as well as with regard to profiling on the basis of religion as well as freedom of worship, particularly in prisons where the Catholic majority are favored over religious minorities. In response to this, prominent Muslim actor and politician Robin Padilla proposed legislation seeking to end religious discrimination particularly against the Filipino Muslim community.

== See also ==
- Religion in the Philippines
- Blasphemy law in the Philippines
- Freedom of religion
- Separation of church and state
- Ebralinag v. School Superintendent
