= Triumphal march =

Musical form generally reflecting a triumph

A triumphal march is a musical form generally reflecting a triumph, victory or great joy.

Many composers have written a triumphal march, with maybe the best known one being by Italian opera composer, Giuseppe Verdi for his 1871 grand opera, Aida, where, in the second act, Radames leads the Egyptian army on its return following their victory over the Ethiopians. The triumphal scene gives directors the opportunity for elaborate spectacle typical of the grand opera of the period in the nineteenth century.

It is often played during graduation ceremonies in Latin America and the Philippines which is also called the Martsang Pandangál (Filipino for "Honours March") which is an excerpt from Verdi's march. The piece is also one of three compositions (the other two being the Spanish anthem Marcha Real and the French anthem La Marseillaise) that influenced the Philippine National Anthem, according to its composer, Julián Felipe. Verdi's triumphal march has also become the background of many a popular football chant, especially in his native Italy.

Among other composers who have composed triumphal marches are Ludwig van Beethoven, Edward Elgar, Edvard Grieg and Alfred Hollins. Alexander Glazunov's is known as the "Triumphal March on the Occasion of the Worlds Columbian Exposition in Chicago, 1893".

== See also ==
- "Marcia trionfale", the second Vatican national anthem
- "Marș triumfal", the first Romanian national anthem
