= Aguinaldo Shrine =

National shrine in Cavite, Philippines

Emilio Aguinaldo Shrine
- Dambanang Emilio Aguinaldo (Filipino)
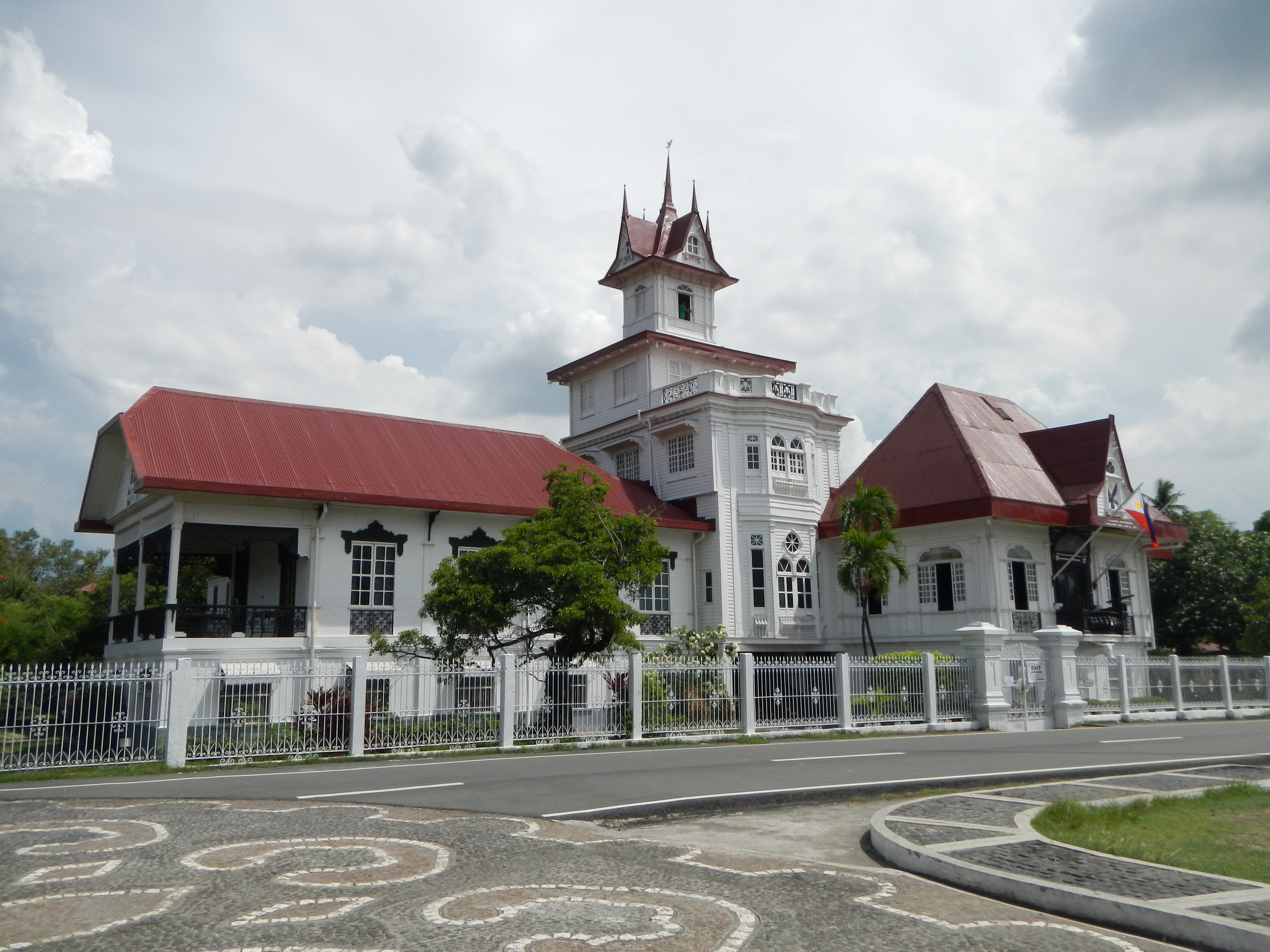
- The façade of the house
- Interactive map of the Emilio Aguinaldo Shrine area
- Alternative names: Emilio Aguinaldo House

General information
- Status: Completed
- Type: Mansion
- Architectural style: American Era Filipino Colonial Bahay na Bato
- Location: Tirona Highway, Kawit, Cavite
- Coordinates: 14°26′42″N 120°54′25″E
- Current tenants: National Historical Commission of the Philippines
- Construction started: 1845; 181 years ago
- Renovated: 1849; 177 years ago and 1919; 107 years ago
- Owner: Government of the Philippines

Technical details
- Floor count: 5 (with a mezzanine level on the second floor)
- Floor area: 1,324 m^{2} (14,250 sq ft)
- Grounds: 4,864 m^{2} (52,360 sq ft)

Design and construction
- Architect: Emilio Aguinaldo
- Designations: National Shrine; June 18, 1964

The Emilio Aguinaldo Shrine (or the Cavite El Viejo Shrine) is a national shrine located in Kawit, Cavite in the Philippines, where the Philippine Declaration of Independence from Spain was declared on June 12, 1898, or Independence Day. To commemorate the event, now known as Araw ng Kalayaan or Independence Day, a national holiday, the Philippine flag is raised here by top government officials on June 12 each year. The house is now a museum.

== History ==
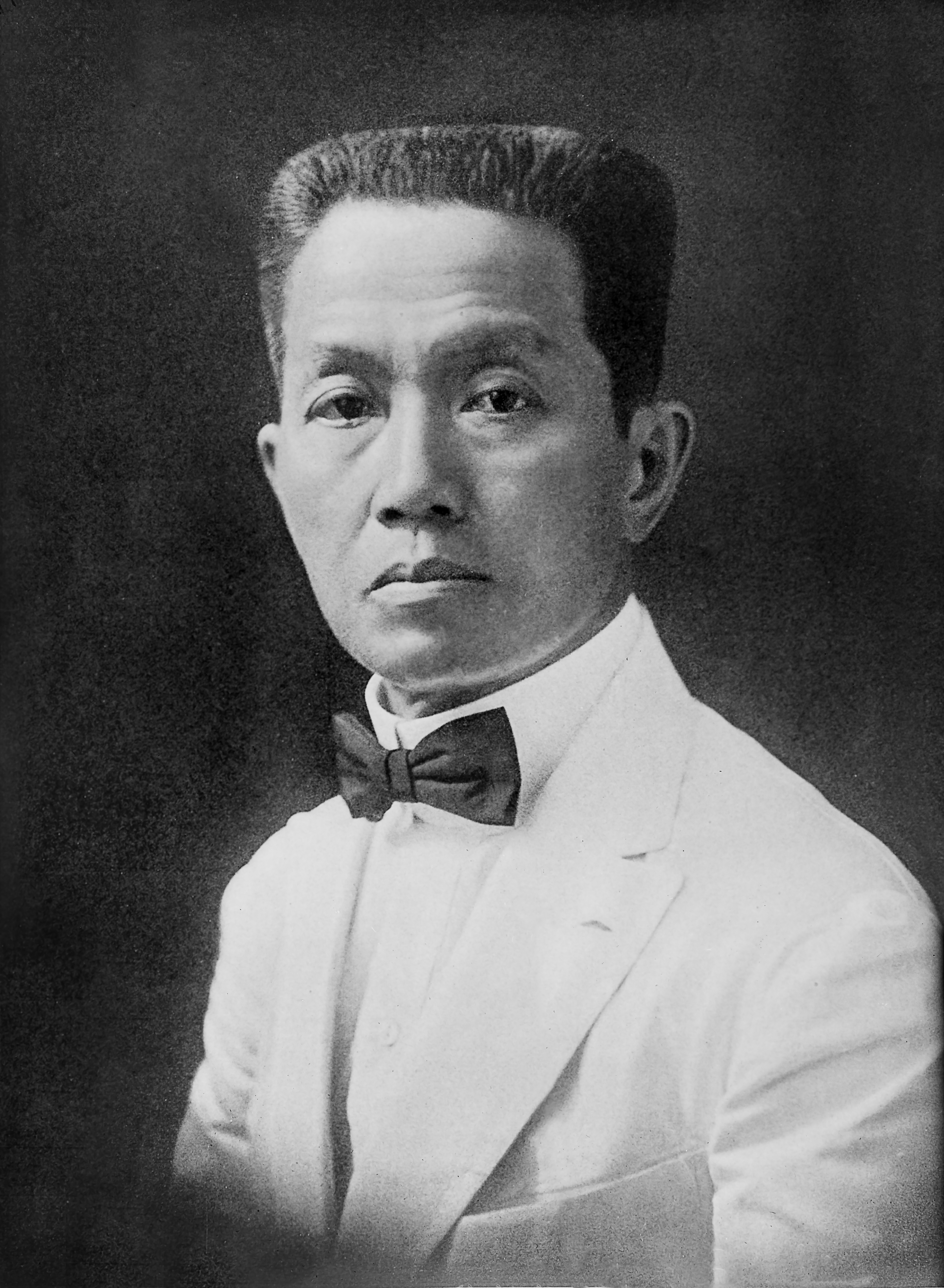
Emilio Aguinaldo

This shrine is the ancestral home of Emilio Aguinaldo, officially the first President of the Philippines, the only president of the First Philippine Republic. The house was built in 1845 made from wood and thatch and reconstructed in 1849. Here, Aguinaldo was born on March 22, 1869.

=== Independence day ===
On June 12, 1898, the independence was proclaimed from the window of the grand hall. The Declaration of Philippine Independence was read by its author, Ambrosio Rianzares Bautista The Declaration of Independence was ratified by the Malolos Congress on September 21, 1898.

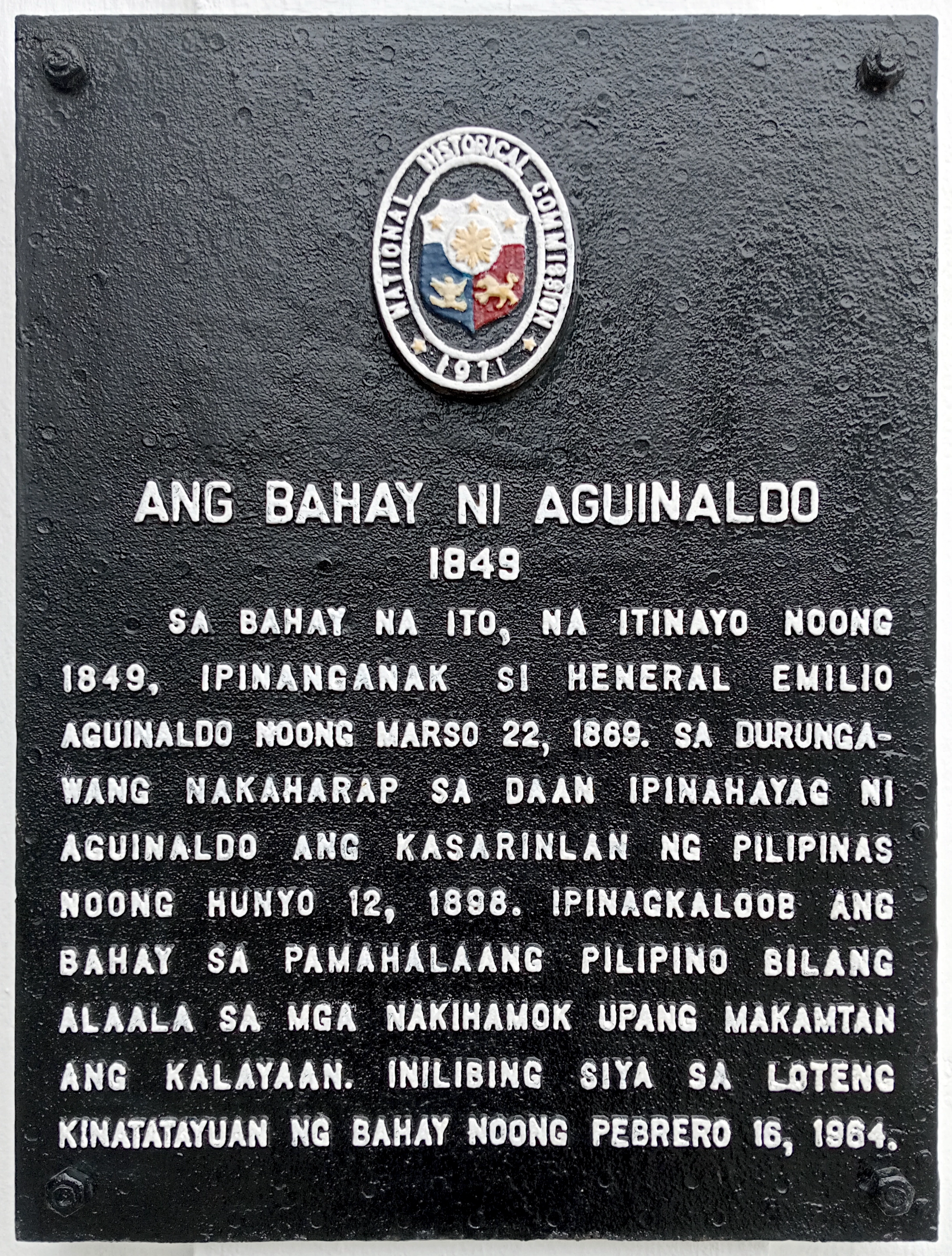
National historical marker installed in 1971

President Aguinaldo greatly enlarged his home from 1919 to 1921, transforming it into a monument to flag and country. He constructed an elaborate "Independence balcony", which Aguinaldo and top Philippine officials used during independence day celebrations. Many visitors today assume the balcony to be the actual location of the Independence Proclamation. Aguinaldo donated his home to the Philippine government on June 12, 1963, "to perpetuate the spirit of the Philippine Revolution of 1896 that put an end to Spanish colonization of the country".

=== National flag and anthem ===
During the independence celebration, the Philippine flag designed by Emilio Aguinaldo was formally unfurled from the front window. It was first flown during the Battle of Alapan in Imus two weeks earlier on May 28, 1898 (now celebrated as the Philippine National Flag Day each year). The Philippine national anthem was also first played on the grounds by the marching band of San Francisco de Malabon (now General Trias) but as an instrumental music; the lyrics were not written until 1899 by José Palma.

=== Declared a National Shrine ===
Emilio Aguinaldo died on February 6, 1964, at the age of 94 at the Veterans Memorial Medical Center in Quezon City. The same year, the government declared the mansion as a National Shrine on June 18 through the Republic Act of 4039 signed by President Diosdado Macapagal.

== Description ==
=== Aguinaldo Park ===
The property which is adjacent to a river, was expanded to include Aguinaldo Park, a park in front of the house created for the Philippine Centennial celebration of 1998. The park contains a long promenade and two long pools. Previously the house was fronted by a busy street, which has since been closed off to all automobile traffic. In the park is a bronze statue of Aguinaldo on horseback.

=== Main house ===
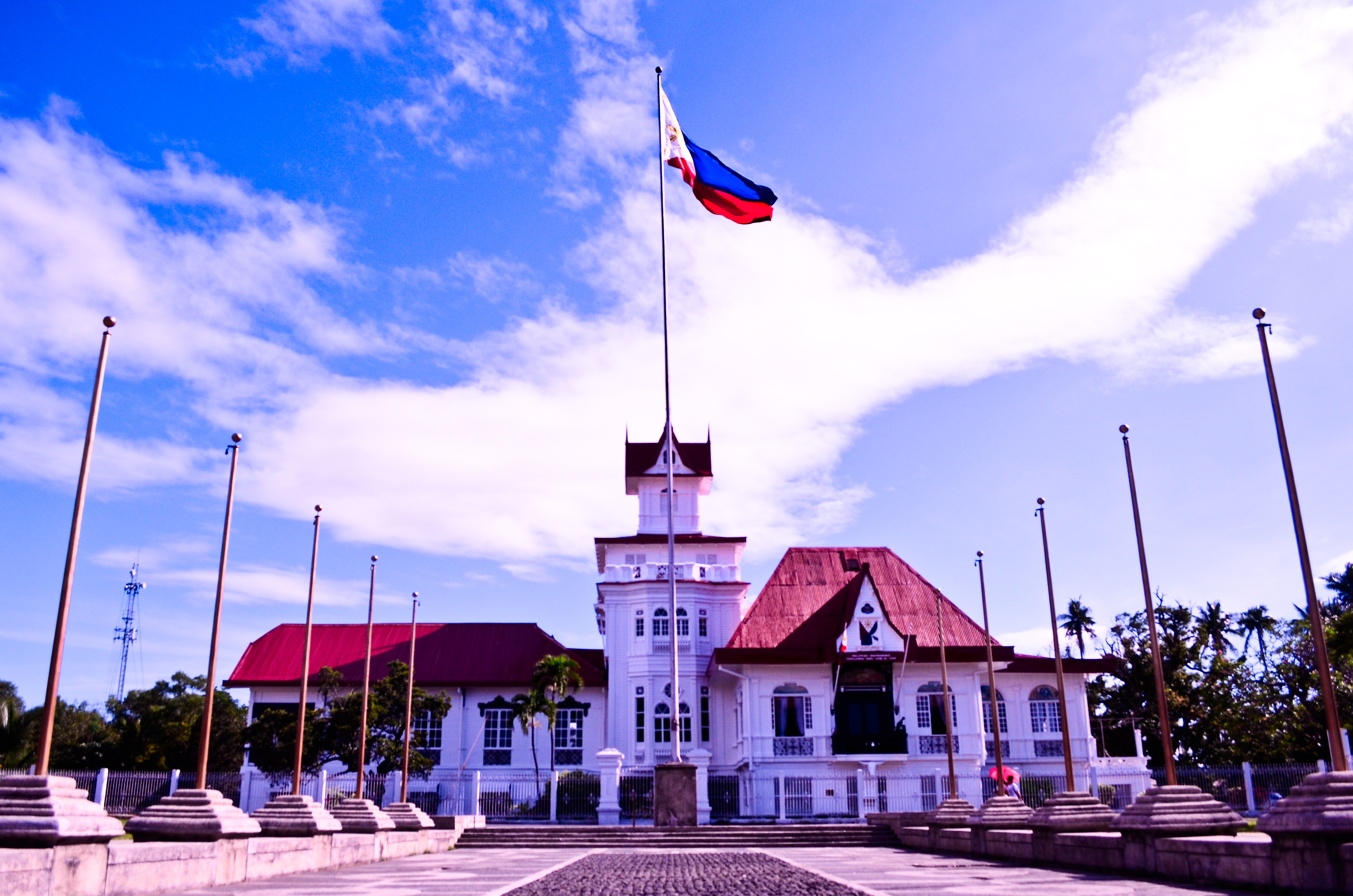
Aguinaldo's mansion

Aguinaldo's house is a mansion over 14,000 square feet (1,300 m^{2}) in floor area designed by Aguinaldo himself. The house features secret passages and hiding places for documents and weapons and is filled with antique furniture and decorated throughout with motifs of the Philippine flag and other national symbols. The building is divided into three sections: the main house on the west side of the building, the family wing on the east, and the tower located in between. The middle section is a five-story tower with a spire at the very top. The mezzanine level on the second floor is sometimes counted as an extra floor. The ground floor of the house was previously unwalled which is typical of the houses during the era. Today, it houses a museum of Aguinaldo's memorabilia and other historical artifacts. A hologram depicting Aguinaldo during the eve of June 12, 1898, is one of the exhibits.

Located on the second floor is the grand hall, a large meeting room with the historic front window from where the Declaration of Independence was read. The front Independence balcony was added by Aguinaldo during the 1919 renovations. The dining room located on the same floor is highlighted by a raised-relief map of the Philippines on its ceiling. Also on this level is the bedroom of Aguinaldo, the kitchen, a conference room, and a partially covered terrace on the western end of the building. On the east wing are three bedrooms for the general's three daughters. A covered balcony (azotea) at the end of the wing was christened by Aguinaldo as Galeria de los Pecadores (Hall of the Sinners) as military plots against the Spanish authorities were planned there.

The next level is a mezzanine library which overlooks the grand hall below. A flight of stairs takes the visitor to the Ambassador Room used as a study by the general's son-in-law, Ambassador Jose Melencio. The next floor is the other bedroom of Aguinaldo which he used during the latter part of his life. A tiled terrace on this level gives a commanding view of the town to as far as Manila. A very narrow ladder takes one to the top of the tower which is allegedly the favorite spot of Aguinaldo.

=== Garden ===
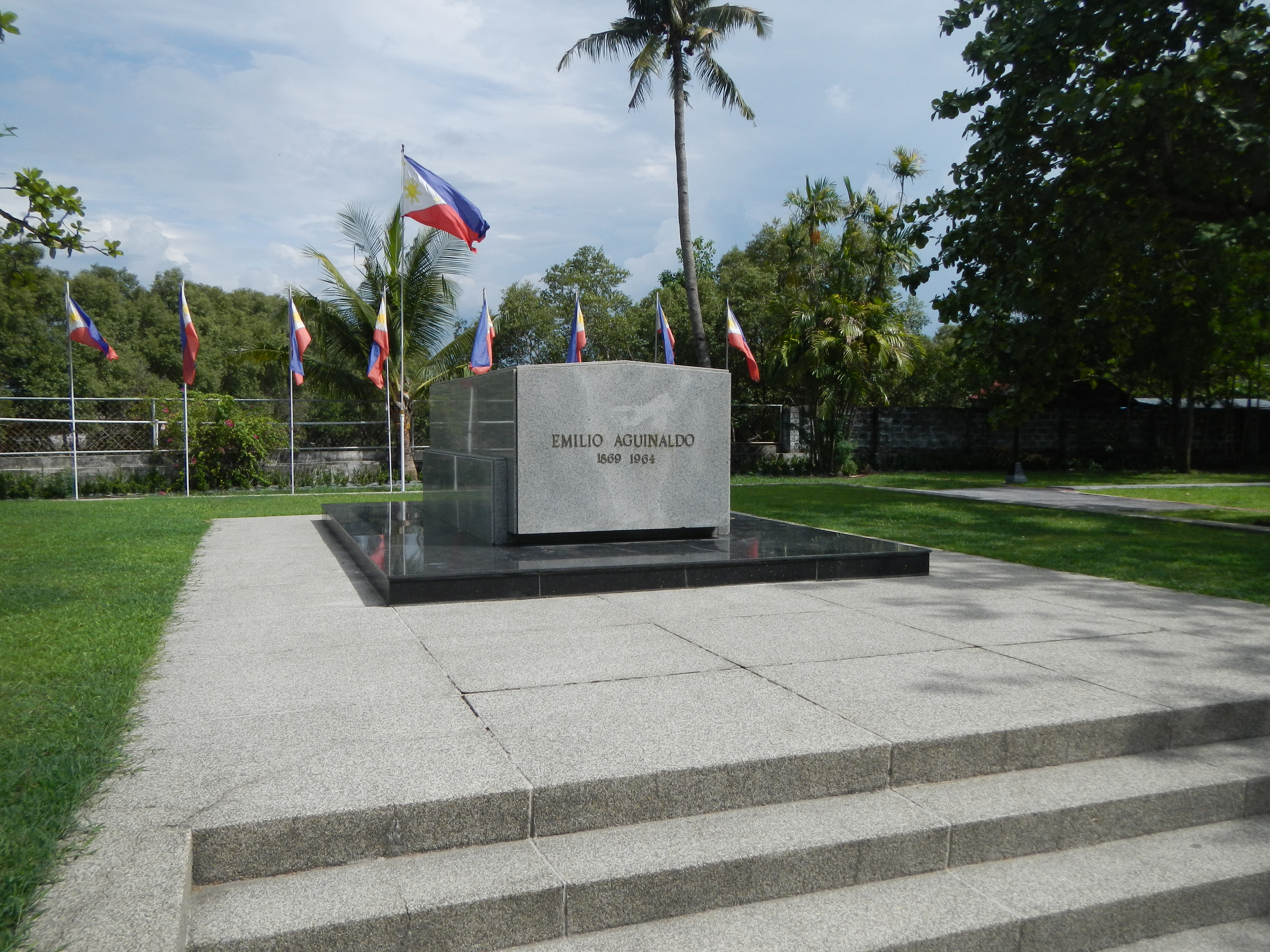
Garden and tomb of Emilio Aguinaldo

The grounds of the house is lush with greenery bordered by a river on the east and backed by a fish pond to the south. On display outside the house is Aguinaldo's personal car, a 1924 Packard limousine restored in November 2009.

In the middle of the garden behind the house is a marble tomb where the first president is interred.

== Museum ==
The Aguinaldo Shrine museum on the ground floor is maintained by the National Historical Commission of the Philippines.
