= José Palma =

Filipino playwright

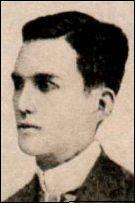
- Photograph of José Palma
- Born: José Palma y Velásquez; June 3, 1876; Tondo, Manila, Captaincy General of the Philippines, Spanish Empire
- Died: February 12, 1903 (aged 26); Manila, Philippine Islands
- Occupations: Soldier, writer
- Known for: lyricist of the Philippine National Anthem

José Palma y Velásquez (Spanish: [xoˈse ˈpalma]: June 3, 1876 – February 12, 1903) was a Filipino poet and soldier. He was on the staff of La independencia at the time he wrote "Filipinas", a patriotic poem in Spanish. It was published for the first time in the issue of the first anniversary of La independencia on September 3, 1899. The poem fit the instrumental tune "Marcha Nacional Filipina" by Julián Felipe, and it has since been the basis for every translation of the Philippine National Anthem.

== Early life ==
Palma was born in Tondo, on June 3, 1876, the youngest child of Don Hermogenes Palma, a clerk at the Intendencia Office, and Hilaria Velásquez. His older brother was the politician, intellectual and journalist Rafael Palma.

After finishing his primera enseñanza (first studies) in Tondó, Palma continued his studies at the Ateneo Municipal. While there, he gradually honed his skills by composing verses. One of his earliest works was La cruz de sampaguitas ("The Cross of Jasmines") in 1893.

== The Katipunan ==
As underground revolutionary activities intensified, Palma devoted his time to composing more poems. In 1894, he joined the Katipunan but did not enter battle when the Philippine Revolution of 1896 broke out. He eventually joined the revolutionary forces of Colonel Rosendo Simón in 1899 when the Philippine–American War erupted and fought under the command of Colonel Servillano Aquino in the encounters in Ángeles and Bambán. Since he could not physically cope with the difficulties of war, he often stayed in camps and entertained the soldiers with kundiman, a traditional Filipino poetic and musical art.

== La independencia ==
He eventually joined the staff of the Tagalog-language section of the revolutionary newspaper, La independencia, to fight against the Americans as he could not on the battlefield. Palma and his colleagues in the newspaper often amused themselves with songs and poems while resting in camps or other places during their marches away from the pursuing American forces.

=== Writing of "Filipinas" ===
It was during a break of the newspaper staff in Bautista, Pangasinán, that Palma’s poetic spirit produced the Spanish ode "Filipinas". Palma wrote "Filipinas" in the house of Doña Romana G. vda. de Favis at Sitio Estación in Barrio Nibaliw, Bayambang (today Barangay Población West, Bautista, Pangasinan). On June 24, 1900, Nibaliw was renamed "Bautista", in honour of Saint John the Baptist, and partitioned as a separate town from Bayambang.

The words were fit and eventually set to composer Julián Felipe's instrumental tune, “Marcha nacional filipina”, which was composed as incidental music a year earlier for the Declaration of Philippine Independence in Kawit, Cavite. "Filipinas" was published in the first anniversary issue of La independencia on September 3, 1899.

==== Complete lyrics ====
Tierra adorada,
hija del sol de Oriente,
su fuego ardiente
en ti latiendo está.

Tierra de amores,
del heroísmo cuna,
los invasores
no te hollarán jamás.

En tu azul cielo, en tus auras,
en tus montes y en tu mar
esplende y late el poema
de tu amada libertad.

Tu pabellón que en las lides
la victoria iluminó,
no verá nunca apagados
sus estrellas ni su sol.

Tierra de dichas, de sol y amores
en tu regazo dulce es vivir;
es una gloria para tus hijos,
cuando te ofenden, por ti morir.

== Death ==
José Palma died of tuberculosis on February 12, 1903, aged 26. No historical accounts are known to where his resting place is, however, his remains were believed to be interred inside the Maria Clara Parish Church of the Iglesia Filipina Independiente in Santa Cruz, Manila.

== Gallery ==
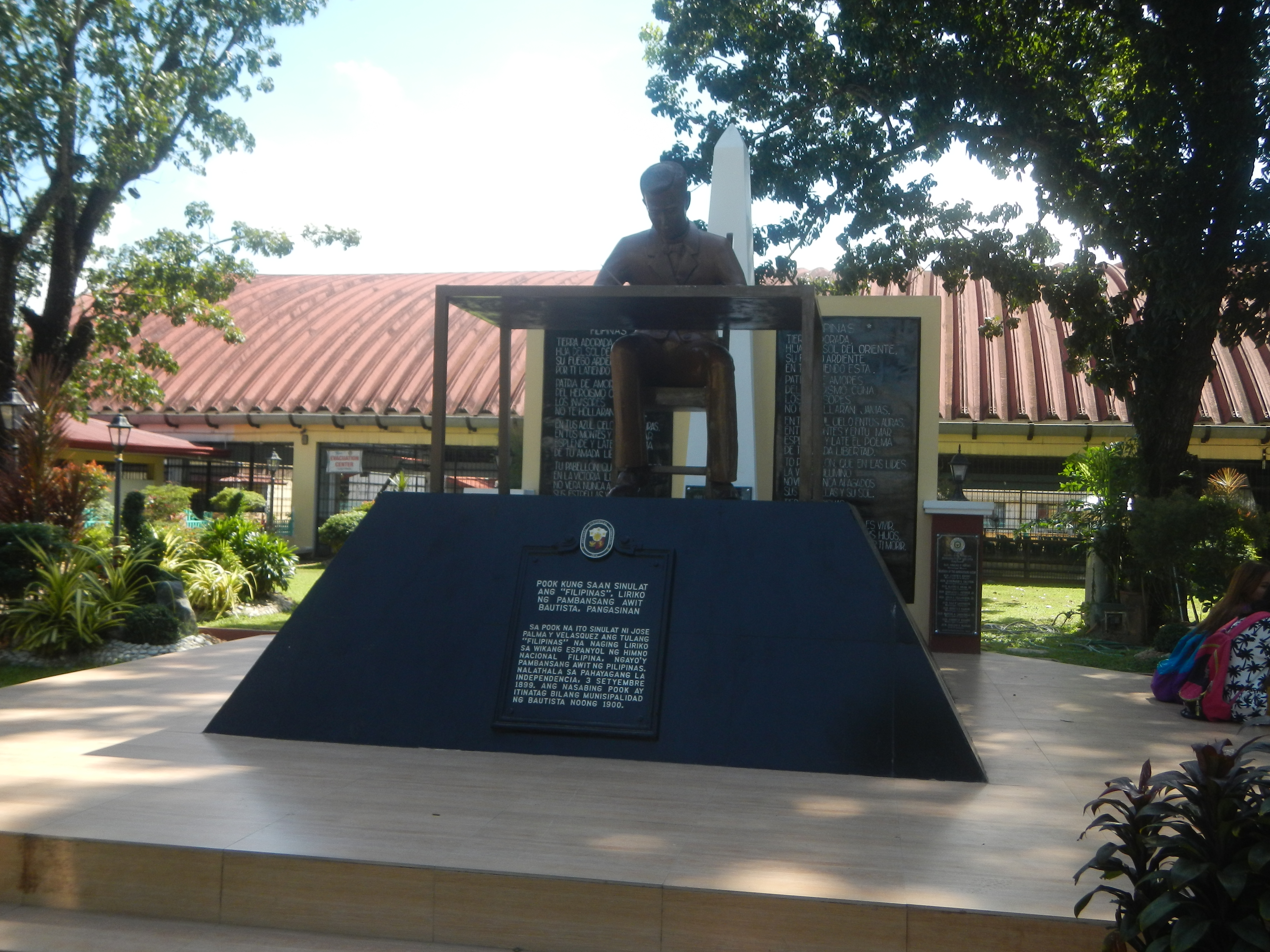
Pook Kung Saan Isinulat Ang Liriko Ng Pambansang Awit "Filipinas" At Dambana Ni José Palma y Velásquez

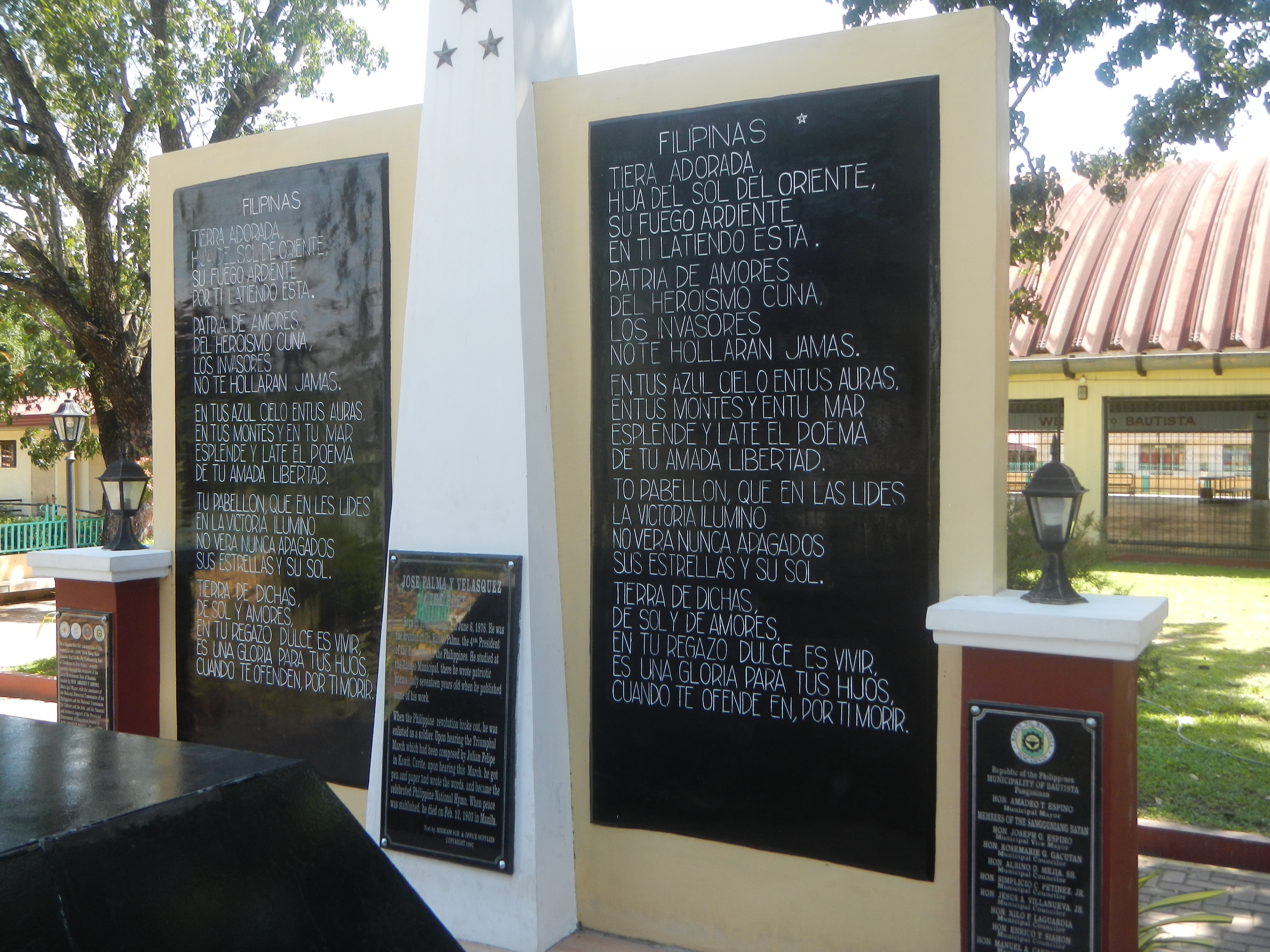
"Filipinas"

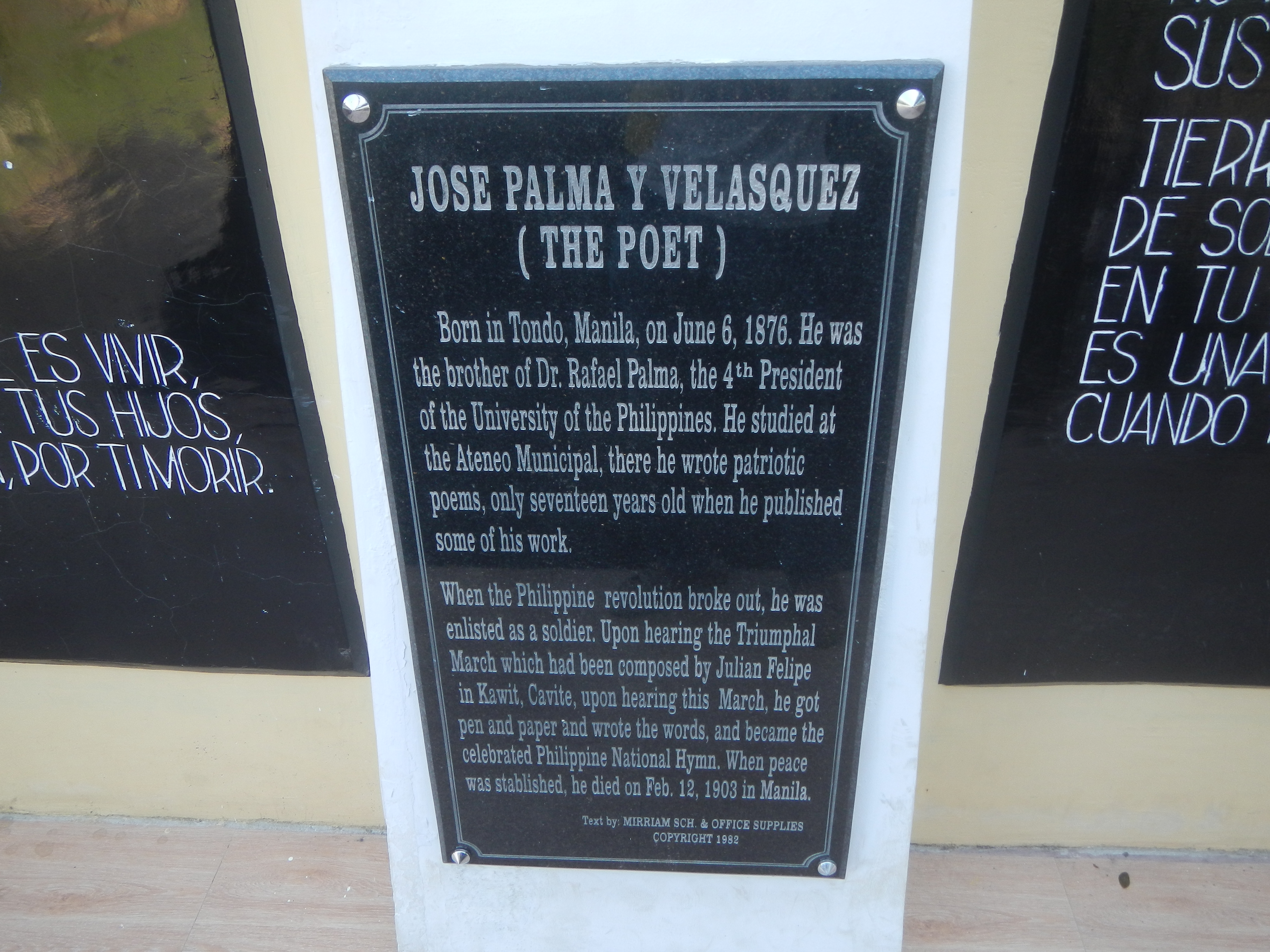
Historical marker

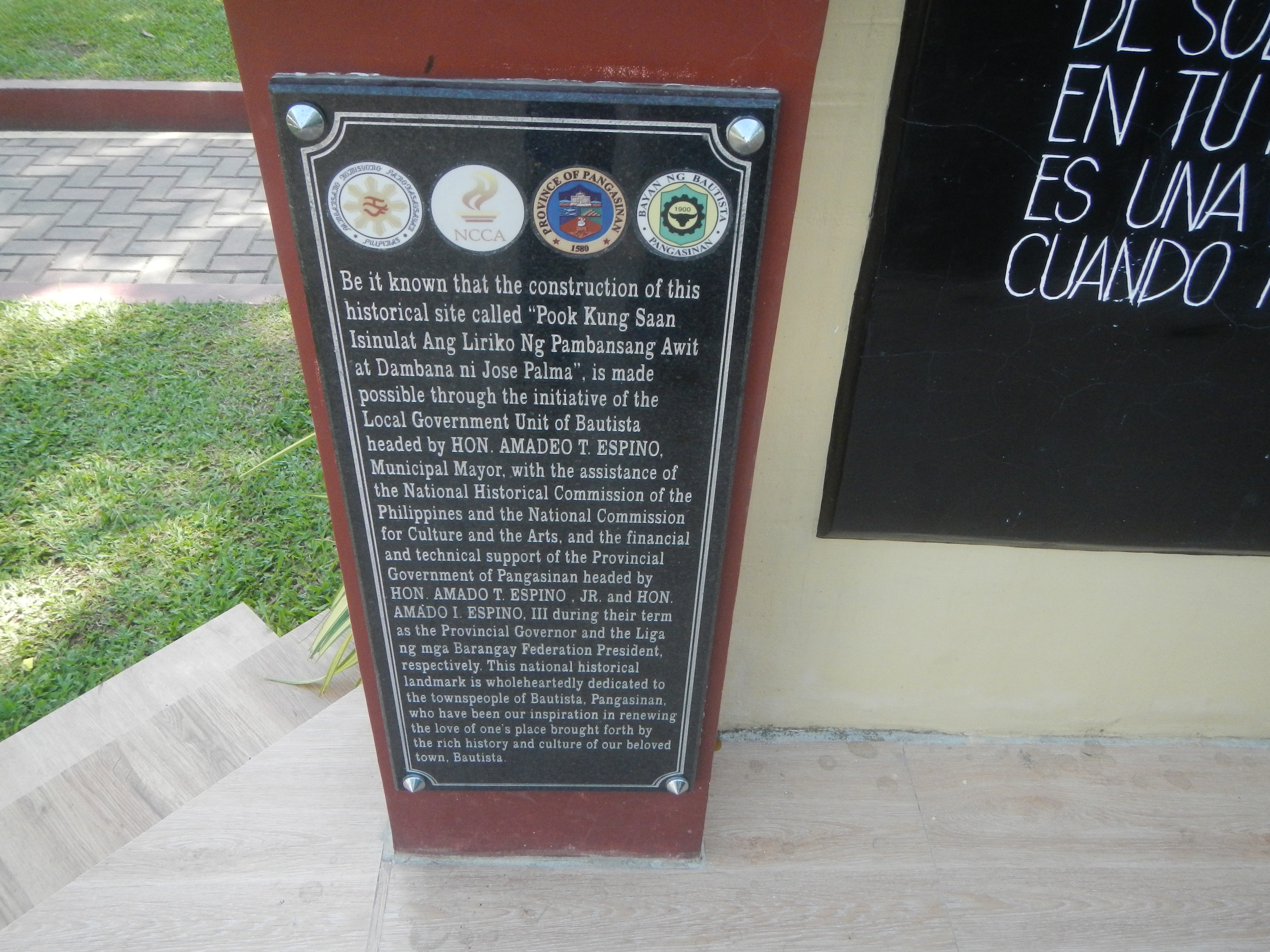
Historical marker
