= Don Ramon Reynado =

Filipino politician

Don Ramon Reynado was one of the founders of the town of Bautista, Pangasinan, Philippines, in the year 1900. During the American Military Government, he was appointed governor of that town.
