= Bautista, Pangasinan =

Municipality in Pangasinan, Philippines

Bautista
- Municipality
- Municipality of Bautista
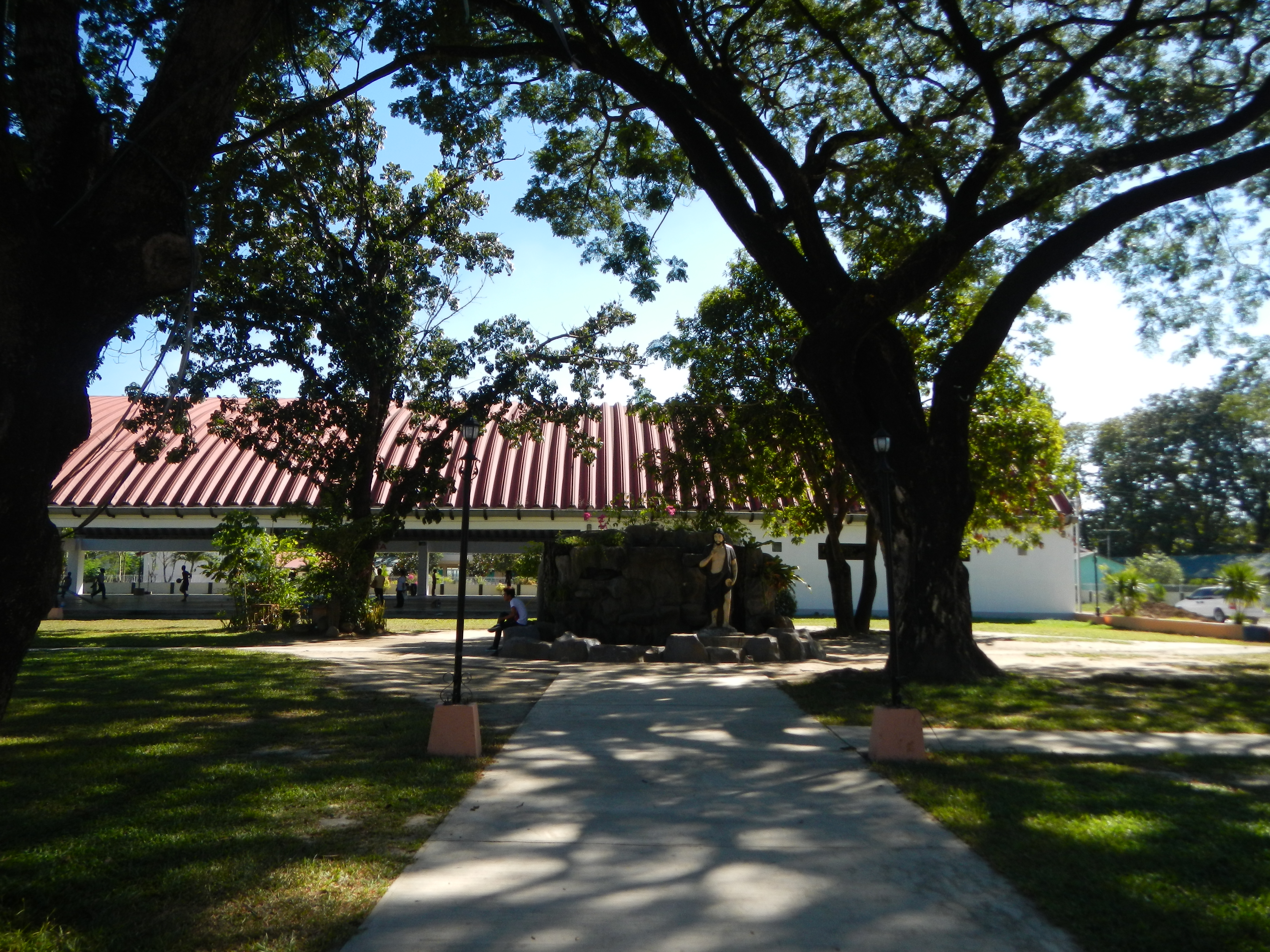
- Bautista municipal park and auditorium

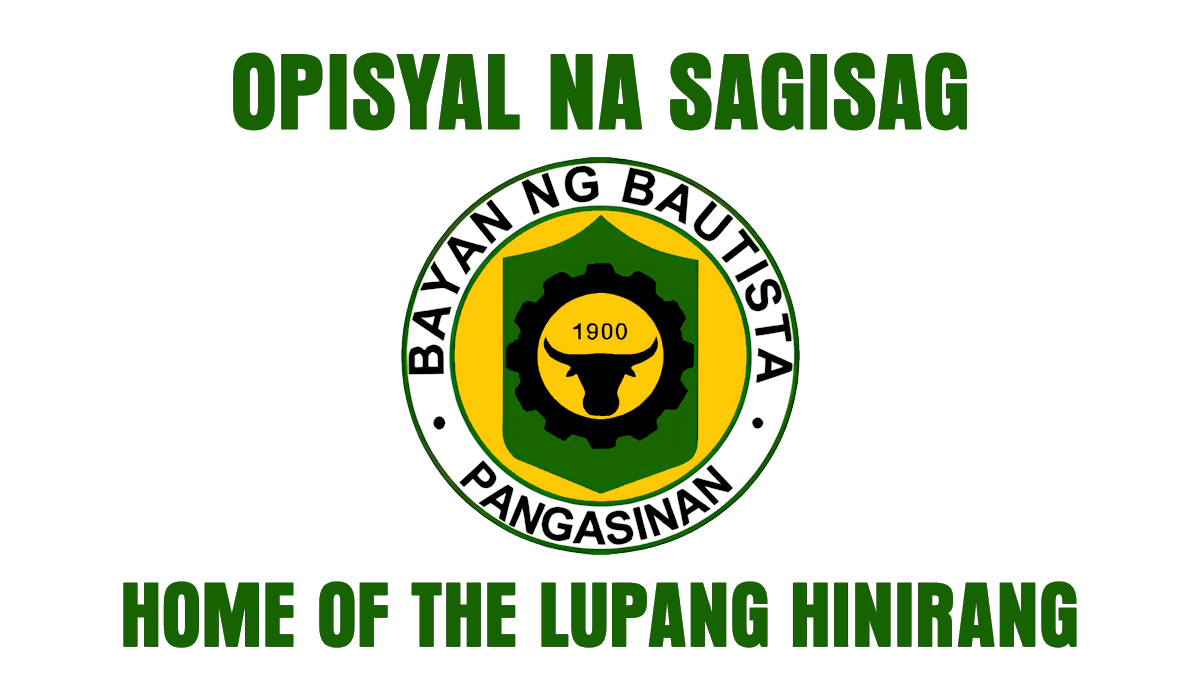
- Flag Seal

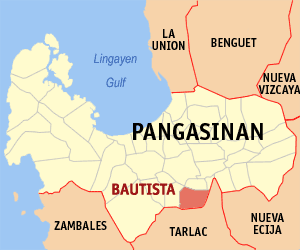
- Map of Pangasinan with Bautista highlighted
- Interactive map of Bautista
- Location within the Philippines
- Coordinates: 15°48′37″N 120°28′32″E
- Country: Philippines
- Region: Ilocos Region
- Province: Pangasinan
- District: 5th district
- Founded: May 5, 1900
- Named for: John the Baptist
- Barangays: 18 (see Barangays)

Government
  - Type: Sangguniang Bayan
  - Mayor: Joseph G. Espino
  - Vice Mayor: Rosemarie Gacutan
  - Representative: Ramon Guico Jr.
  - Municipal Council: Members: Rosemarie G. Gacutan; Albino D. Mejia Sr.; Simplicio I. Petinez III; Raem V. Aquino; Jesus S. Villanueva; Enrico Y. Siahon; Nilo F. Laguardia; Dominador C. Ramos
  - Electorate: 22,909 voters (2025)

Area
  - Total: 46.33 km^{2} (17.89 sq mi)
- Elevation: 21 m (69 ft)
- Highest elevation: 48 m (157 ft)
- Lowest elevation: 12 m (39 ft)

Population (2024 census)
  - Total: 35,728
  - Density: 771.2/km^{2} (1,997/sq mi)
  - Households: 8,478

Economy
  - Income class: 3rd municipal income class
  - Poverty incidence: 13.46% (2023)
  - Revenue: ₱ 156.9 million (2024)
  - Assets: ₱ 300.6 million (2024)
  - Expenditure: ₱ 132.4 million (2024)
  - Liabilities: ₱ 38.91 million (2024)

Utilities
  - Electricity: Central Pangasinan Electric Cooperative (CENPELCO)
  - Water: Bayambang Water District (BayWaD)
- Time zone: UTC+8 (PST)
- ZIP code: 2424
- PSGC: 0105510000
- IDD : area code: +63 (0)75
- Native languages: Pangasinan; Ilocano; Tagalog

Bautista, officially the Municipality of Bautista (Pangasinan: Baley na Bautista; Ilocano: Ili ti Bautista; Tagalog: Bayan ng Bautista; Spanish: Municipio de Bautista), is a municipality in the province of Pangasinan, Philippines. According to the 2024 census, it has a population of 35,728 people.

It is called "The Walis Tambo (broom) Capital of Pangasinan" and honored as the "Lupang Hinirang".

== History ==
The Boletín Ecclesiástico de Filipinas published that the Dominicans founded the towns of Binalatongan (now San Carlos), 1588; Calasiao, 1588; Mangaldán, 1600; Manaoag, 1608; Lingayén, 1614; Dagupan, 1614; and, Telbang (now Bautista), 1614 in Pangasinan. Historian Rosario Cortez however wrote that Bautista has been in existence since 1686, but was removed from the Parish of Bayambang.

The so-called "Rebirth of Bautista" as a municipality came about in 1900. Don Ramón Reynado became the first town executive, along with other notable founders: Guillermo Agcaoile, Francisco Gonzales, Felipe Ramos, Dionisio Galvan, Teodoro Carungay, Claudio and Antonio Galsim, Marciano Guzman, Nicolas Galsim, Marcelino Villanueva and Eleno Cayabyab.

Bautista was dubbed "mercancia" or "Melting Pot" (where cargoes bound for Camiling, Tarlac were traded via the Agno River or by train). The municipality was described as a melting pot due to the diversity of the ethnicities and languages of its residents, including Pangasinenses, Ilocanos, Tagalogs, Pampangos, Chinese, and Spanish. The people of Nibaliw, Baluyot and Cabuaan are mostly Pangasinenses. The people of Nandacan, Villanueva, Poponto, Primicias, Artacho and Pogo are predominantly Ilocanos. Within the Poblacion, residents had different persuasions, ideals and expression in varied dialects and language.

Bautista natives' livelihoods are farming, broom making (fiber, tanobong and midribs), dressmaking, sawali making, buro making, building construction, auto mechanics, basketry, bag making, blacksmithing, pottery, ceramics and hollow blocks making and rattan crafts. The residents also have clay, cattle, poultry, bamboo, rattan, anahaw, abiang, fishes, sugar, basi, vinegar and coconut, including watermelon and onion, its principal product.

1907 to 1920 was its golden years until San Quintin-Paniqui rail road line was opened, thus Bautista lost to Rosales, Tayug and San Quintin. The big floods of 1934 and 1972 almost annihilated the flood-prone town.

=== Alcala March to Righteousness ===
The Alcala December 5, 2012 "March to Righteousness" was launched to have joined the Ombudsman of the Philippines observance of December 9 International Anti-Corruption Day United Nations Convention against Corruption (UNCAC), General Assembly of the United Nations (UN). Recently, Alcala held its Incident Command System Training, the Bautista LGU-Pangasinan, the Malacanang & Google hold MapUp Session, the 23rd National Statistics Month (NSM) and Philippine Civil Service Anniversary 2012.

== Geography ==
The Municipality of Bautista is part of Pangasinan's Fifth Congressional District with a land area of 8,213 hectares. It is bounded by Alcala to the north, Bayambang to the south, and Agno River and Moncada, Tarlac to the east.

Bautista is situated 40.52 kilometres (25.18 mi) from the provincial capital Lingayen, and 189.76 kilometres (117.91 mi) from the country's capital city of Manila.

=== Barangays ===
Bautista is politically subdivided into 18 barangays: Each barangay consists of puroks and some have sitios.

- Artacho
- Baluyot
- Cabuaan
- Cacandongan
- Diaz
- Nandacan
- Nibaliw Norte
- Nibaliw Sur
- Palisoc
- Poblacion East
- Poblacion West
- Pogo
- Poponto
- Primicias
- Ketegan
- Sinabaan
- Vacante
- Villanueva

Barangay Poblacion West is the site where the lyrics of the Philippine National Anthem were written, and it is known as the "Home of the Philippine National Anthem". In 1899, Jose Palma wrote his poem "Filipinas" which became the Anthem's lyrics.

=== Climate ===
Climate data for Bautista, Pangasinan
| Month | Jan | Feb | Mar | Apr | May | Jun | Jul | Aug | Sep | Oct | Nov | Dec | Year |
|---|---|---|---|---|---|---|---|---|---|---|---|---|---|
| Mean daily maximum °C (°F) | 31 (88) | 31 (88) | 31 (88) | 33 (91) | 32 (90) | 32 (90) | 30 (86) | 30 (86) | 30 (86) | 31 (88) | 31 (88) | 31 (88) | 31 (88) |
| Mean daily minimum °C (°F) | 21 (70) | 21 (70) | 22 (72) | 24 (75) | 24 (75) | 24 (75) | 23 (73) | 23 (73) | 23 (73) | 23 (73) | 23 (73) | 22 (72) | 23 (73) |
| Average precipitation mm (inches) | 5.1 (0.20) | 11.6 (0.46) | 21.1 (0.83) | 27.7 (1.09) | 232.9 (9.17) | 350.8 (13.81) | 679.8 (26.76) | 733.1 (28.86) | 505 (19.9) | 176.6 (6.95) | 67.2 (2.65) | 17.7 (0.70) | 2,828.6 (111.38) |
| Average rainy days | 3 | 3 | 3 | 4 | 14 | 18 | 23 | 25 | 22 | 15 | 8 | 4 | 142 |
Source: World Weather Online (modeled/calculated data, not measured locally)

== Demographics ==
Population census of Bautista

| Year | Pop. | ±% p.a. |
|---|---|---|
| 1903 | 6,661 | — |
| 1918 | 5,424 | −1.36% |
| 1939 | 7,203 | +1.36% |
| 1948 | 9,176 | +2.73% |
| 1960 | 12,375 | +2.52% |
| 1970 | 14,985 | +1.93% |
| 1975 | 16,749 | +2.26% |
| 1980 | 18,072 | +1.53% |

| Year | Pop. | ±% p.a. |
|---|---|---|
| 1990 | 21,280 | +1.65% |
| 1995 | 23,375 | +1.77% |
| 2000 | 27,066 | +3.19% |
| 2007 | 28,094 | +0.52% |
| 2010 | 30,193 | +2.66% |
| 2015 | 32,307 | +1.30% |
| 2020 | 35,398 | +1.94% |
| 2024 | 35,728 | +0.22% |

Source: Philippine Statistics Authority

== Economy ==
Poverty incidence of Bautista (%)

Source: Philippine Statistics Authority

== Government ==
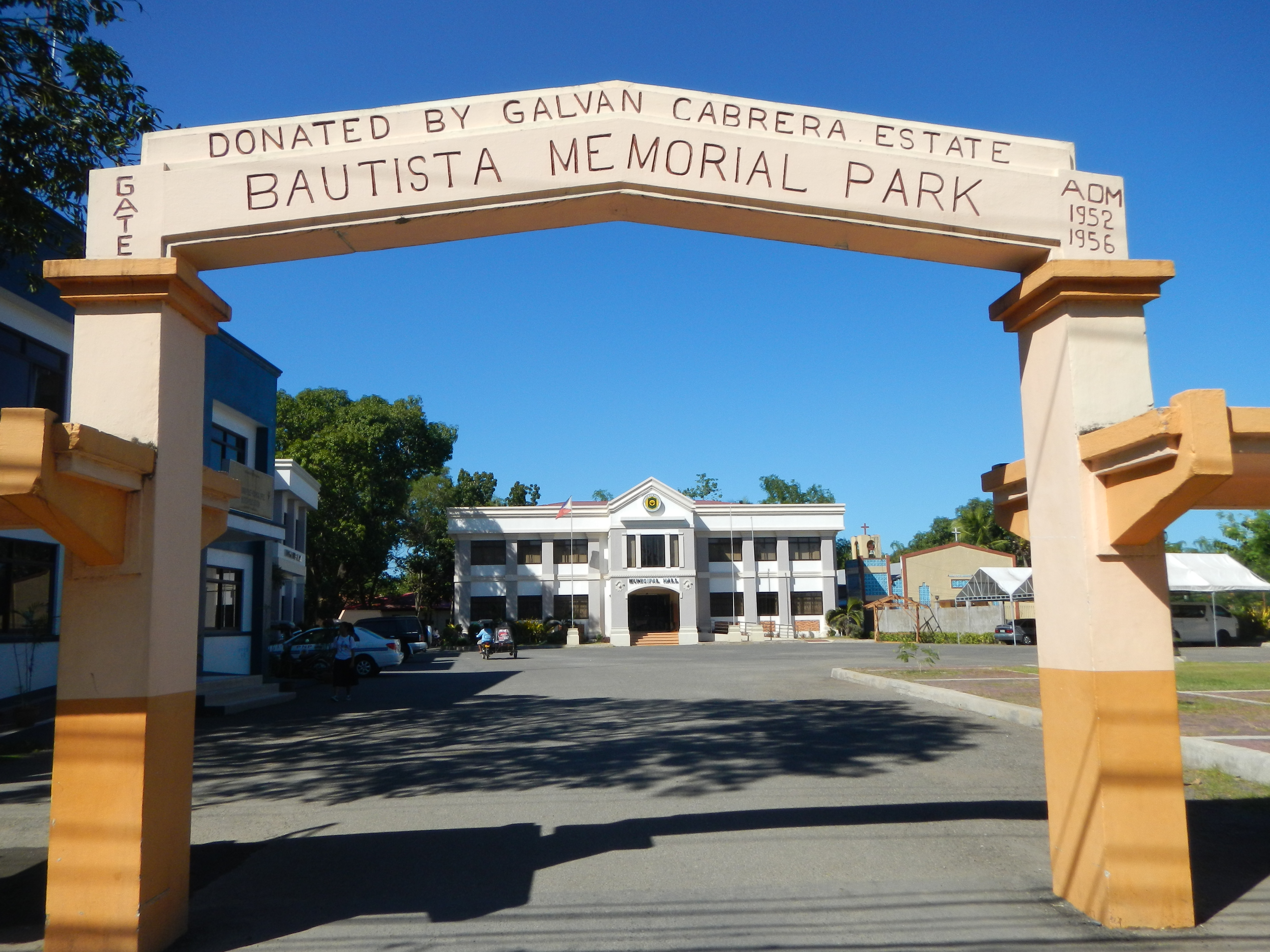
Arch of welcome and Municipal hall

=== Local government ===
Bautista, belonging to the fifth congressional district of the province of Pangasinan, is governed by a mayor designated as its local chief executive and by a municipal council as its legislative body in accordance with the Local Government Code. The mayor, vice mayor, and the councilors are elected directly by the people through an election which is being held every three years.

=== Municipal seal ===
The official seal of Bautista has "BAYAN NG BAUTISTA" amid the green color (agricultural area, the gear, farming developments, the carabao).

=== Elected officials ===
Members of the Municipal Council (2019–2022):

- Congressman: Ramon Guico Jr.
- Mayor: Rosemarie G. Gacutan
- Vice-Mayor: Joren Aaron C. Espino
- Councilors:
  - Joseph G. Espino
  - Alex S. Tagulao
  - Alfredo P. Laguardia
  - Simplicio I. Petinez III
  - Johnny S. Junio
  - Zamboy Alfaro
  - Bernabe Pasana Jr.
  - Mylene De Leon

== Tourism ==
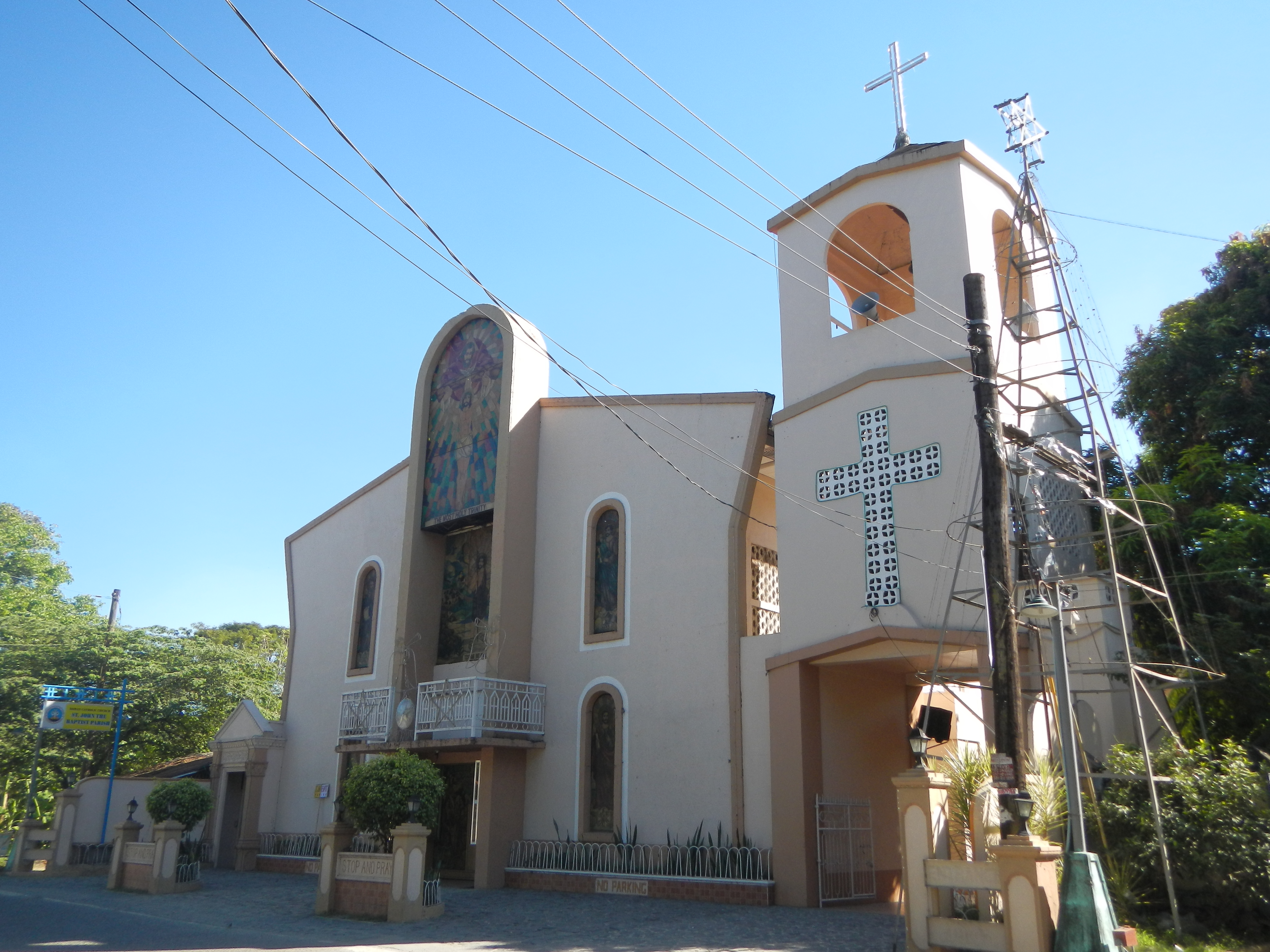
1723 Parish Church of St. John the Baptist facade

Bautista celebrates Philippine Eagle Week from June 4, 2012, to June 10, 2012 (Presidential Proclamation No. 79).

In the "Parada Na Dayew", a festivals of Pangasinan towns in the 432nd anniversary of April 11, 2012, Bautista Float Entry "Lupang Hinirang" claimed the 1st runner-up trophy with a cash of P 75,000 and trophy.

- Maekrisanne Resort, Bautista Police Building, Bautista Municipal Park, Bautista Municipal Auditorium, Rural Bank of Bautista (Pangasinan), Inc. and Jose Palma Historic Place
- 2nd Buntis Congress was held at Bautista (August 15, 2012, at Maekrisanne Garden Resort attended by 134 participants).

=== 1723 Parish Church of St. John the Baptist ===
Bautista derived its name from Saint John the Baptist ("Voice of the Wilderness and the Precursor of the Lord"), hence its town fiesta on June 23 and 24, the nativity of St. John, the Baptist.

The Parish Church of St. John the Baptist (F-1723), Poblacion East, Bautista, 2424 Pangasinan has a population of 19,547 Catholics with Parish Priests, Rev. Rafael Mesa and Rev. Rolando A. Fernandez. It is a part of the Vicariate IV: Queen of Peace, under the jurisdiction of the Roman Catholic Archdiocese of Lingayen-Dagupan. Its Vicar Forane is Rev. Fr. Alberto T. Arenos.

== Education ==
The Bautista Schools District Office governs all educational institutions within the municipality. It oversees the management and operations of all private and public elementary and high schools.

=== Primary and elementary schools ===
- A. Diaz Sr. Elementary School
- Artacho Elementary School
- Baluyot Elementary School
- Bautista Central School SPED Center
- Cabuaan Elementary School
- Ketegan Elementary School
- Nibaliw Elementary School
- Pogo Elementary School
- Poponto Elementary School
- Vacante Elementary School
- Villanueva Elementary School

=== Secondary schools ===
- Baluyot National High School
- Bautista National High School
- Coloscaoayan National High School

== Sources ==
- Boletin Ecclesiastico de Filipinas
  - Rosario Cortez, PANGASINAN, 1901-1986: A Political, Socio Economic and Cultural History
