= Awit sa Paglikha ng Bagong Pilipinas =

Philippine anthem

English: Hymn to the Creation of the New Philippines
- National anthem of the Second Philippine Republic (1943–1945)
- Lyrics: Catalino S. Dionisio, 1942
- Music: Felipe Padilla de León, 1942
- Adopted: 1942
- Relinquished: 1945

Awit sa Paglikha ng Bagong Pilipinas (English: Hymn to the Creation of a New Philippines), also known by its incipit Tindig! Aking Inang Bayan (English: "Stand! My Motherland"), is a patriotic song written by Filipino composer Felipe Padilla de León. It was commissioned during the Japanese occupation of the Philippines and intended to supplant Lupang Hinirang (then sung to its English translation as the Philippine Hymn) as the national anthem. It was also sung by the members of the Hukbo ng Bayan Laban sa Hapon, however, the words bear sentiments against the Japanese occupiers and the desire for national liberation.

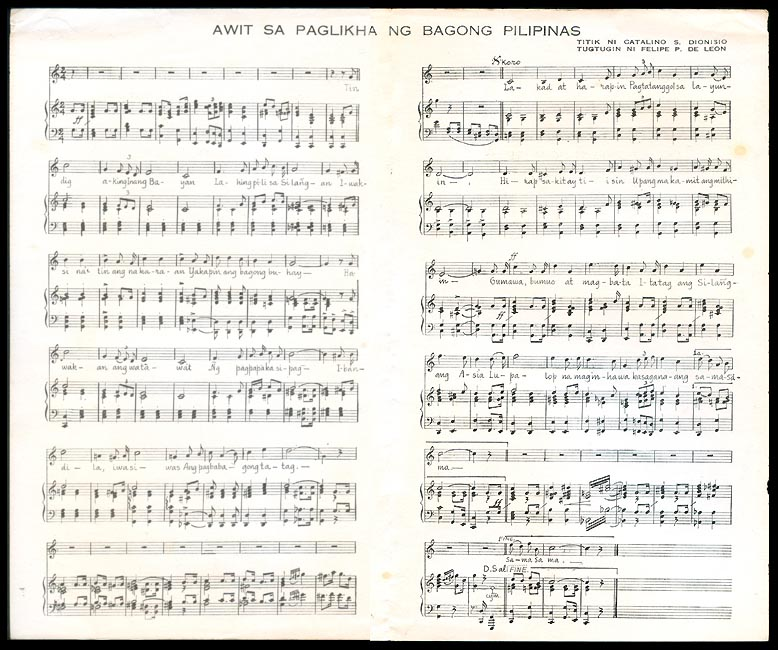
Awit sa Paglikha ng Bagong Pilipinas sheet music

The song was also appropriated by the communist New People's Army with the title Tindig Uring Anakpawis (Tagalog: "Arise, Working Class").

The Philippine Madrigal Singers recorded a rendition of the song for the album Bayan Ko, Aawitan Kita ("My Country, I Shall Sing For Thee"), an anthology of historic patriotic songs from the Spanish era up to the 20th century that was released for the Philippine Centennial in 1998.

== Lyrics ==
Original Tagalog lyrics

Tindíg! Aking Ináng Bayan,
Lahing pilî sa silangan
Iwaksî natin ang nakaraán,
Yakapin ang bagong buhay.

Hawakan ang watawat
Ng pagpápakasipag
Ibandila, iwasiwas
Ang pagbabagong tatág

Lakad at harapín
Pagtatanggól sa layunin
Hirap, sakit ay tiisín
Upang makamít ang mithiin

Gumawâ, bumuó, at magbatá
Itatág ang silangang Asya
Lupalop na maguinhawâ
Kasaganaang sama-sama

Unofficial, literal English translation

Stand! My Motherland
Chosen race in the East
Let us end the past
Embrace the new life.

Hold the flag
Of hardworking-ness
Flourish, brandish
The founding anew.

Walk and face
The defense of the purpose
Hardship and pain, we endure
In order to achieve our goal.

Make, form, and endure
Establish East Asia
Continent of wealth
Prospering all together.
