= Lupang Hinirang =

National anthem of the Philippines

English: 'Chosen Land'
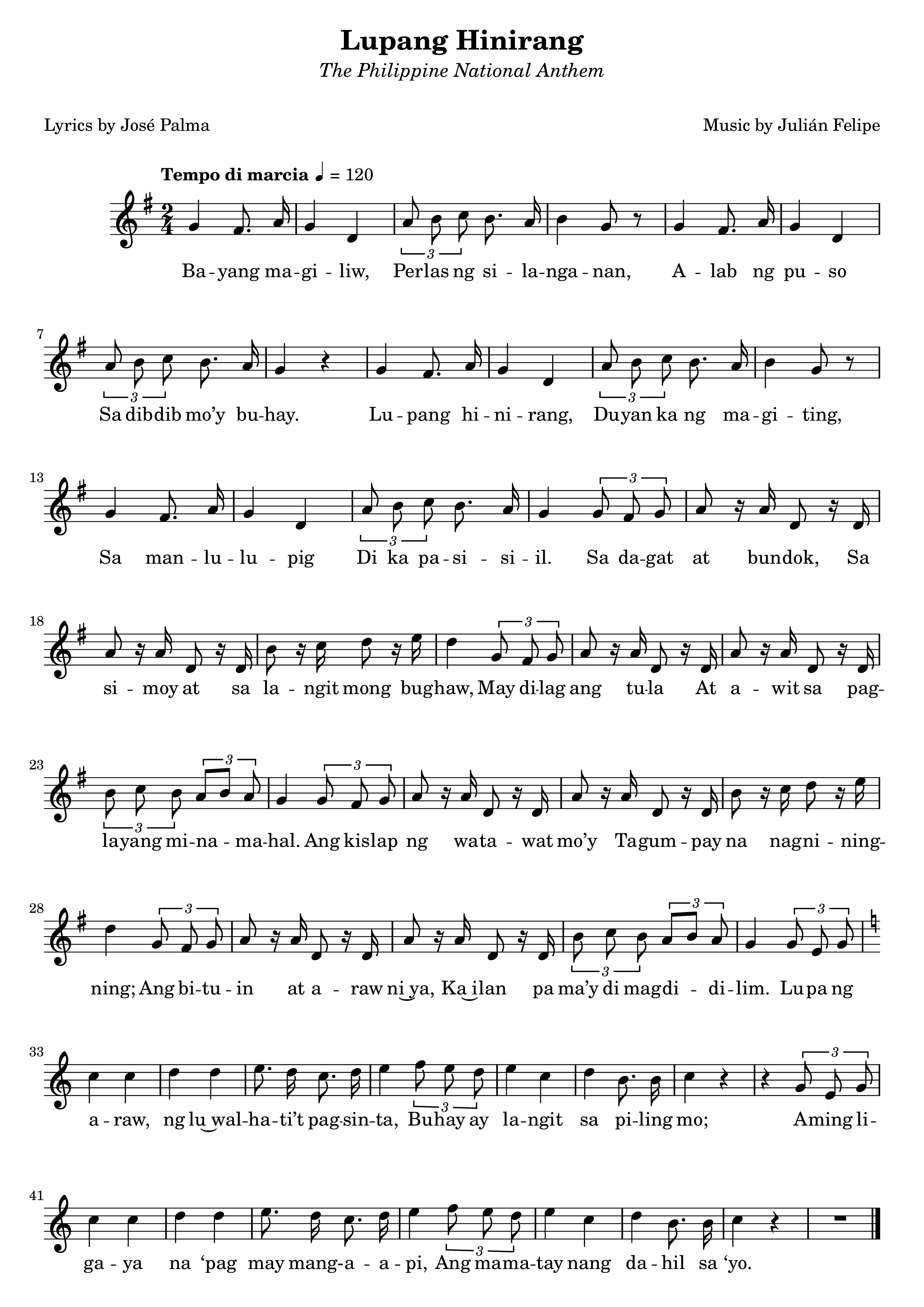
- Music sheet of "Lupang Hinirang"
- National anthem of the Philippines
- Also known as: "Marcha Nacional Filipina" (original title of the march composed by Julián Felipe) (English: 'Philippine National March') "Filipinas" (original title of the poem written by José Palma)
- Lyrics: José Palma (original Spanish lyrics), 1899; Felipe Padilla de León (Tagalog lyrics), 1956
- Music: Julián Felipe, 1898
- Adopted: June 12, 1898 (music); 1899 (Spanish lyrics); May 26, 1956 (Tagalog lyrics); February 12, 1998 (codification of the 1956 Filipino lyrics)

Audio sample
- The Philippine national anthem, "Lupang Hinirang": file; help

"Lupang Hinirang" ('Chosen Land'), originally titled in Spanish as "Marcha Nacional Filipina" ('Philippine National March'), and also commonly and informally known by its incipit "Bayang Magiliw" ('Beloved Country'), is the national anthem of the Philippines. Its music was composed in 1898 by Julián Felipe, and the lyrics were adopted from the Spanish poem "Filipinas", written by José Palma in 1899.

The composition known as "Lupang Hinirang" was commissioned on June 5, 1898, by Emilio Aguinaldo, head of the Dictatorial Government of the Philippines, as a ceremonial and instrumental national march without lyrics, similar to the status of the "Marcha Real" in Spain. It was first performed in public during the proclamation of Philippine independence at Aguinaldo's residence in Kawit, Cavite, on June 12, 1898. It was re-adopted as the national march of the Philippine Republic (Spanish: República Filipina) in 1899.

Following the defeat of the First Republic in the Philippine–American War and the subsequent Colonial rule of the United States, the Flag Act of 1907 prohibited the public display of flags, banners, emblems, or devices used by the Philippine Republican Army during the war. Though the Flag Act did not prohibit public performance of the national march, an entire band was imprisoned in 1909 for playing the anthem at a fiesta. Upon repeal of the Flag Act in 1919, the national march regained its popular status as the national anthem of the Philippines. Following the establishment of self-rule under the Commonwealth of the Philippines, Commonwealth Act No. 382, approved on September 5, 1938, officially adopted the musical arrangement and composition by Julián Felipe as the national anthem.

In the years after the revolution, the poem "Filipinas", written in 1899 by nationalist José Palma, gained widespread popularity as unofficial Spanish lyrics of the anthem. The Spanish lyrics were translated into English and, beginning in the 1940s, in the national language. The current Filipino lyrics, written in 1956 and with a slight revision in the 1960s, were adopted and made official. On February 12, 1998, Republic Act No. 8491 was passed, codifying these lyrics into law.

== History ==
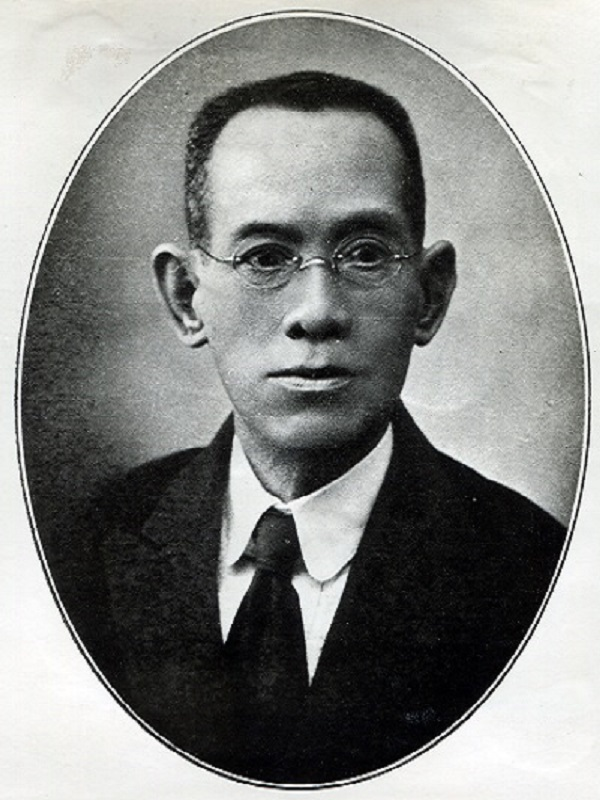
Julián Felipe, composer of the music

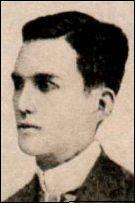
José Palma, author of the lyrics

"Lupang Hinirang" began as incidental music which President Emilio Aguinaldo commissioned for use in the proclamation of Philippine independence from Spain. This task was given to Julián Felipe and was to replace a march which Aguinaldo had deemed unsatisfactory. The original title of this new march was "Marcha Filipina-Magdalo" (Philippine-Magdalo March), and was later changed to "Marcha Nacional Filipina" (Philippine National March) upon its adoption as the national anthem of the First Philippine Republic on June 11, 1898, a day before independence was to be proclaimed. Felipe said that he had based his composition on three other musical pieces: the "Marcha Real", which is the current Spanish national anthem; the "Grand March" from Giuseppe Verdi's Aida; and the French national anthem, "La Marseillaise". It was played by the Banda San Francisco de Malabón (now called the Banda Matanda, from present-day General Trias) during the proclamation rites on June 12.

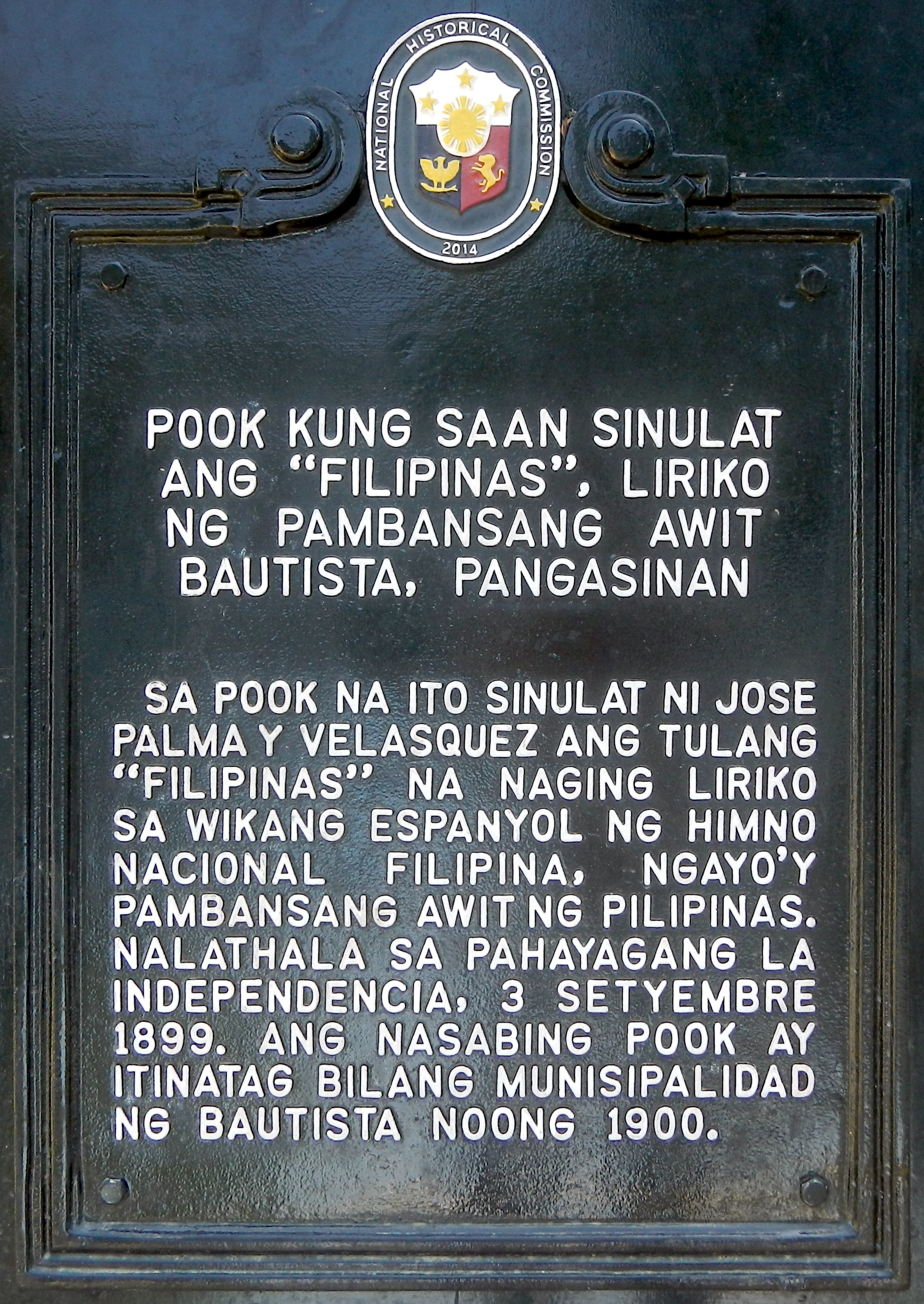
National historical marker installed in 2017 in Bautista commemorating the writing of "Filipinas" by José Palma

In August 1899, soldier and writer José Palma penned the Spanish poem "Filipinas" during his stay in Casa Hacienda in Bautista, Pangasinan. The poem was published for the first time for the first anniversary of the newspaper La Independencia on September 3, 1899, and was subsequently set to the tune of the "Marcha Nacional Filipina".

The Flag Act of 1907 prohibited the use of the anthem and other Philippine revolutionary and Katipunan symbols for a short period of time. When it was repealed back in 1919, the Insular Government decided to translate the hymn from its original Spanish version to the English version. The first translation was written around that time by the renowned poet Paz Márquez Benítez of the University of the Philippines. The most popular translation, called the "Philippine Hymn", was written by Senator Camilo Osías and an American, Mary A. Lane. The anthem was played alongside the United States anthem, "The Star-Spangled Banner", which was adopted in 1931, until the country's eventual independence in 1946.

Tagalog translations began appearing in the 1940s, with the first known one titled "Diwa ng Bayan" (Spirit of the Country), which was sung during the Japanese occupation of the Philippines. The second most popular one was "O Sintang Lupa" (O Beloved Land) by Julián Cruz Balmaceda, Ildefonso Santos, and Francisco Caballo; this was adopted as the official version in 1948. Upon the adoption of "Diwa ng Bayan", the song "Awit sa Paglikha ng Bagong Pilipinas" and the Japanese national anthem "Kimigayo" were replaced.

During the term of President Ramon Magsaysay, Education Secretary Gregorio Hernández formed a commission to revise the lyrics. On May 26, 1956, the Tagalog translation "Lupang Hinirang" was sung for the first time. Minor revisions were made in the 1960s, and it is this version by Felipe Padilla de León which is presently used.

The Marcos Sr. dictatorship until the 1986 EDSA Revolution saw the use of the National Anthem as the opening protest song of some political parties, activist organizations, and union groups, accompanied by the use of the "raised clenched fist" salute instead of the traditional hand-to-heart salute. This was notably done by opposition political parties and activists.

Some of the original meanings in "Filipinas" have been lost in translation; for example, "hija del sol de oriente" (Daughter of the orient (eastern) sun) in the original Spanish version became "child of the sun returning" in the Philippine Hymn and "perlas ng silanganan" (pearl of the orient) in the present (official) version. The time signature in performance had been changed from 2/4 to 4/4 to facilitate singing and the key changed from the original C major to G in the 1920s. However, this change was not codified into law.

The 1956 Filipino lyrics were confirmed in 1958 by Republic Act No. 8491 (the "Flag and Heraldic Code of the Philippines") in 1998, abandoning use of both the Spanish and English versions. Philippine law requires that the anthem always be rendered in accordance with Felipe's original musical arrangement and composition, but the original holograph cannot be located. In 2011, Senator Bong Revilla introduced a bill which, among other things, would have removed the requirement that the anthem be sung "in its original Filipino lyrics and march tempo", but this was not promulgated into law.

=== Other anthems ===
"Lupang Hinirang" was not the first Philippine national anthem to ever be conceived. The composer and revolutionist Julio Nakpil composed "Marangal na Dalit ng Katagalugan" (Honorable Hymn of the Tagalog Nation/People) upon the request of Andrés Bonifacio, the leader of the Katipunan, the secret society that had spearheaded the Revolution. Bonifacio had converted the organization into a revolutionary government—with himself as President—known as the Tagalog Republic just before hostilities erupted. The term "Katagalugan" in Bonifacio's usage referred to the Philippine Islands and its population as a whole; not just ethnic Tagalogs, but all Filipinos. Nakpil composed his national anthem for Bonifacio in Balara (part of modern Quezon City) in November 1896, and Bonifacio later promoted its use in Cavite, where it was still known as late as 1898. But after Bonifacio's Katipunan and Republika ng Katagalugan were superseded by a succession of various governments led by Aguinaldo starting in 1897, Nakpil's anthem was never officially adopted by them.

Some sources assert that an English version written by Mary A. Lane and Camilo Osías was legalized by Commonwealth Act No. 382. The act, however, only concerns itself with the instrumental composition by Julián Felipe.

During World War II, Felipe Padilla de León composed "Awit sa Paglikha ng Bagong Pilipinas", commissioned as a replacement anthem by the Japanese-sponsored Second Philippine Republic. It was later adapted during the martial law era under President Ferdinand Marcos into the patriotic song titled "Hymn of the New Society", not to be confused with the "March of the New Society".

== Lyrics ==
=== Official lyrics ===
The following Spanish, English and Tagalog versions of the national anthem have been given official status throughout Philippine history. However, only the current Filipino version is officially recognized by the Flag and Heraldic Code, approved on February 12, 1998, which specifies, "The National Anthem shall always be sung in the 'national language' within or outside the country; violation of the law is punishable by a fine and imprisonment." Several bills have been introduced to amend the Flag and Heraldic Code to highlight the importance of complying, abiding and conforming to the standard expression as prescribed by law, but none have been enacted into law.

Official Filipino version
(Lupang Hinirang)
IPA transcription of Filipino (Note: See Help:IPA/Tagalog and Tagalog phonology.)
Original Spanish version
(Marcha Nacional Filipina)
Baybayin version
(ᜎᜓᜉᜅ᜔ ᜑᜒᜈᜒᜇᜅ᜔)
Former English version
(Land of the Morning)

Bayang magiliw,
Perlas ng silanganan,
Alab ng puso
Sa dibdib mo'y buhay.

Lupang hinirang,
Duyan ka ng magiting,
Sa manlulupig
Di ka pasisiil.

Sa dagat at bundok,
Sa simoy at sa langit mong bughaw,
May dilag ang tula
At awit sa paglayang minamahal.

Ang kislap ng watawat mo'y
Tagumpay na nagniningning;
Ang bituin at araw niya,
Kailan pa ma'y di magdidilim.

Lupa ng araw, ng luwalhati't pagsinta,
Buhay ay langit sa piling mo;
Aming ligaya na 'pag may mang-aapi,
Ang mamatay nang dahil sa 'yo.

[ˈba.jɐŋ mɐ.ˈɡi.lɪʊ |]
[ˈpeɾ.lɐs nɐŋ sɪ.lɐ.ˈŋa.nɐn |]
[ˈʔa.lɐb nɐŋ ˈpu.so(ʔ) |]
[sɐ dɪb.ˈdib moɪ bu.ˈhaɪ ‖]

[ˈlu.pɐŋ hɪ.ˈni.ɾɐŋ |]
[ˈdu.jɐn k(x)ɐ nɐŋ mɐ.ˈɡi.tɪŋ |]
[sɐ mɐn.lʊ.ˈlu.pɪg |]
[ˈdi(ʔ) k(x)ɐ pɐ.ˌsɪ.sɪ.ˈʔil ‖]

[sɐ ˈda.gɐt ʔɐt bʊn.ˈdok]
[sɐ ˈsi.moɪ ʔɐt sɐ ˈla.ŋɪt moŋ bʊɡ.ˈhaʊ |]
[maɪ dɪ.ˈlaɡ ʔɐŋ tʊ.ˈlaʔ]
[ʔɐt ˈʔa.wɪt sɐ pɐg.ˈla.jɐŋ mɪ.ˌna.mɐ.ˈhal ‖]

[ʔɐŋ kɪs.ˈlap nɐŋ wɐ.ˈta.wɐt moɪ]
[tɐ.ˈgum.pɐɪ nɐ nɐg.ˌni.nɪŋ.ˈniŋ |]
[ʔɐŋ bɪ.tʊ.ˈ(ʔ)in ʔɐt ˈʔa.ɾɐʊ ɲa]
[k(x)ɐɪ.ˈlan pɐ maɪ ˈdi(ʔ) mɐg.ˌdɪ.dɪ.ˈlim ‖]

[ˈlu.pɐ(ʔ) nɐŋ ˈʔa.ɾɐʊ nɐŋ lwɐl.ˈha.tɪt pɐɡ.sin.ˈtɐ]
[ˈbu.haɪ ʔaɪ ˈla.ŋɪt sɐ ˈpi.lɪŋ mɔ |]
[ˈʔa.miŋ lɪ.ˈga.jɐ nɐ pɐɡ maɪ mɐŋ.ˌʔɐ.ʔɐ.ˈpi]
[ʔɐŋ mɐ.mɐ.ˈtaɪ nɐŋ ˈda.hɪl sɐ ˈjɔ ‖]

Tierra adorada,
Hija del sol de Oriente,
Su fuego ardiente
En ti latiendo está.

Tierra de amores,
Del heroísmo cuna,
Los invasores,
No te hollarán jamás.

En tu azul cielo, en tus auras,
En tus montes y en tu mar,
Esplende y late el poema
De tu amada libertad.

Tu pabellón, que en las lides,
La victoria iluminó,
No verá nunca apagados
Sus estrellas y su sol.

Tierra de dichas, de sol y amores,
En tu regazo dulce es vivir.
Es una gloria para tus hijos,
Cuando te ofenden, por ti morir.

ᜊᜌᜅ᜔ ᜋᜄᜒᜎᜒᜏ᜔,
ᜉᜒᜇ᜔ᜎᜐ᜔ ᜈᜅ᜔ ᜐᜒᜎᜅᜈᜈ᜔,
ᜀᜎᜊ᜔ ᜈᜅ᜔ ᜉᜓᜐᜓ
ᜐ ᜇᜒᜊ᜔ᜇᜒᜊ᜔ ᜋᜓᜌ᜔ ᜊᜓᜑᜌ᜔.

ᜎᜓᜉᜅ᜔ ᜑᜒᜈᜒᜇᜅ᜔,
ᜇᜓᜌᜈ᜔ ᜃ ᜈᜅ᜔ ᜋᜄᜒᜆᜒᜅ᜔,
ᜐ ᜋᜈ᜔ᜎᜓᜎᜓᜉᜒᜄ᜔
ᜇᜒ ᜃ ᜉᜐᜒᜐᜒᜁᜎ᜔.

ᜐ ᜇᜄᜆ᜔ ᜀᜆ᜔ ᜊᜓᜈ᜔ᜇᜓᜃ᜔,
ᜐ ᜐᜒᜋᜓᜌ᜔ ᜀᜆ᜔ ᜐ ᜎᜅᜒᜆ᜔ ᜋᜓᜅ᜔ ᜊᜓᜄ᜔ᜑᜏ᜔,
ᜋᜌ᜔ ᜇᜒᜎᜄ᜔ ᜀᜅ᜔ ᜆᜓᜎ
ᜀᜆ᜔ ᜀᜏᜒᜆ᜔ ᜐ ᜉᜄ᜔ᜎᜌᜅ᜔ ᜋᜒᜈᜋᜑᜎ᜔.

ᜀᜅ᜔ ᜃᜒᜐ᜔ᜎᜉ᜔ ᜈᜅ᜔ ᜏᜆᜏᜆ᜔ ᜋᜓᜌ᜔
ᜆᜄᜓᜋ᜔ᜉᜌ᜔ ᜈ ᜈᜄ᜔ᜈᜒᜈᜒᜅ᜔ᜈᜒᜅ᜔;
ᜀᜅ᜔ ᜊᜒᜆᜓᜁᜈ᜔ ᜀᜆ᜔ ᜀᜇᜏ᜔ ᜈᜒᜌ,
ᜃᜁᜎᜈ᜔ ᜉ ᜋᜌ᜔ ᜇᜒ ᜋᜄ᜔ᜇᜒᜇᜒᜎᜒᜋ᜔.

ᜎᜓᜉ ᜈᜅ᜔ ᜀᜇᜏ᜔, ᜈᜅ᜔ ᜎᜓᜏᜎ᜔ᜑᜆᜒ'ᜆ᜔ ᜉᜄ᜔ᜐᜒᜈ᜔ᜆ,
ᜊᜓᜑᜌ᜔ ᜀᜌ᜔ ᜎᜅᜒᜆ᜔ ᜐ ᜉᜒᜎᜒᜅ᜔ ᜋᜓ;
ᜀᜋᜒᜅ᜔ ᜎᜒᜄᜌ ᜈ ᜉᜄ᜔ ᜋᜌ᜔ ᜋᜅ᜔ᜀᜀᜉᜒ,
ᜀᜅ᜔ ᜋᜋᜆᜌ᜔ ᜈᜅ᜔ ᜇᜑᜒᜎ᜔ ᜐ ᜌᜓ.

Land of the morning,
Child of the sun returning,
With fervor burning
Thee do our souls adore.

Land dear and holy,
Cradle of noble heroes,
Ne'er shall invaders
Trample thy sacred shores.

Ever within thy skies and through thy clouds,
And o'er thy hills and seas,
Do we behold the radiance, feel the throb
Of glorious liberty.

Thy banner dear to all our hearts,
Its sun and stars alight,
Oh, never shall its shining fields
Be dimmed by tyrant's might!

Beautiful land of love, o land of light,
In thine embrace 'tis rapture to lie,
But it is glory ever, when thou art wronged,
For us, thy sons to suffer and die.

Source: (Note: Some sources present parts of this differently. example: the first line of the second stanza as "Patria de Amores", which can be translated as "Beloved homeland"; the fourth line of the second stanza as "No te hallarán jamás," which literally translates to "They shall never find you.")

=== Other historical lyrics ===
Kapampangan adaptation
(Dalit ning Lahi)
Pre-Commonwealth English version
Japanese-era Tagalog version
Post-World War II Tagalog version
(O Sintang Lupa)

Labuad a mapalad
Mutya nang lalu sampat
Ning dayat-malat
A queca misapuac.

Budning sultana
Guinu na ning Malasia
Pemalena'na
Ning tapat a sinta.

Caring bunduc mu at caqueuan
Batis, ulu't pulung cacal
Bitasang macalimbagan
Ing quecang catimauan.

Qng bandila mung maningning
A tecutan da ring tacsil
Capilan man e culimlim
Ing aldo na at batuin.

Labuad ning aldo, sinta't tepangan
Mayumung diling queque ca mie
Iyang ligaiang quequeng paniangian
Ing queca que ngan paimate.

O land beloved,
Child of the sunny Orient,
Whose ardent spirit
Ever burns in thy breast!

O land of beauty,
Cradle of valiant warriors,
Tyrant oppressors
Never will daunt thy sons!

On the blue seas and verdant hills
And in the winds and azure skies,
Thy immortal voice of Liberty
We hear in ringing song arise.

On thy dear banner that has led
Thy sons to victory in the fight,
Forever shall its sun and stars
Unclouded shine with golden light.

Philippines, O land beloved of the sun,
On thy dear bosom life is sweet!
But in the hour when men must die for thee,
Gladly our lives we’ll lay at thy feet!

Lupang mapalad,
Na mutya ng silangan;
Bayang kasuyo,
Ng sangkalikasan.

Buhay at yaman,
Ng Kapilipinuhan;
Kuha't bawi,
Sa banyagang kamay.

Sa iyong langit, bundok,
batis, dagat na pinalupig;
Nailibing na ang karimlan,
Ng kahapong pagtitiis.

Sakit at luha, hirap,
Sisa at sumpa sa pag-aamis;
ay wala nang lahat at naligtas,
Sa ibig manlupit.

Hayo't magdiwang lahi kong minamahal,
Iyong watawat ang siyang tanglaw;
At kung sakaling ikaw ay muling pagbantaan,
Aming bangkay ang siyang hahadlang.

O sintang lupa,
Perlas ng Silanganan,
Diwang apoy kang
Sa araw nagmula.

Lupang magiliw,
Pugad ng kagitingan,
Sa manlulupig
Di ka papaslang.

Sa iyong langit, simoy, parang.
Dagat at kabundukan,
Laganap ang tibok ng puso
Sa paglayang walang hanggan.

Sagisag ng watawat mong mahal
Ningning at tagumpay;
Araw't bituin niyang maalab
Ang s'yang lagi naming tanglaw.

Sa iyo, Lupa ng ligaya't pagsinta,
Tamis mabuhay na yakap mo,
Datapwa't langit ding kung ikaw ay apihin
Ay mamatay ng dahil sa 'yo.

Source:^{(lyrics in cited sources differ between sources and from lyrics given above)}

=== Proposed lyrical revisions ===
In 2018, Senate president Vicente Sotto III criticized the final line, "ang mamatay nang dahil sa 'yo" (literally "to die because of you [the country]" and translated above as "For us, thy sons to suffer and die."), in reference to Horace's Dulce et decorum est pro patria mori as "defeatist", but a proposed revision with a message of commitment to defending the country's independence drew popular backlash. In 2013, musician Joey Ayala, tampered with the national anthem in a forum by changing the last line to "ang magmahal nang dahil sa 'yo" ("to love for the country") and arranged the time signature from 4/4 to 6/8, drawing mixed reactions from the public. In 2018, Senate President Tito Sotto suggested that last line should be revised to "ang ipaglaban ang kalayaan mo" ("to defend your freedom") as it reflects the commitment of the Filipinos to defend the country's independence, but his suggestion was not well-received online.

== Music and tempo ==
R.A. 8491 specifies that in official or civic gatherings the anthem "shall be in accordance with the musical arrangement and composition of Julián Felipe." However, when literally followed, this would require performance by a pianist or by a brass band, as these were the only versions that were produced by Julián Felipe. The original version was composed in duple time (i.e., in a time signature of 2/4) and was changed to the present quadruple time (4/4) in the 1920s to make singing easier by reducing emphasis on syncopation.

During televised boxing matches featuring Filipino boxer Manny Pacquiao, singers have been both praised and criticized by the National Historical Institute (NHI) for singing too slow or too fast. The NHI says that the proper time signature is 2/4 and the proper tempo is 100 bpm. The NHI also states that the anthem should last 53 seconds.

== Usage ==
2008 official government recordings
Orchestral and tenor solo vocal version

Orchestral and teen solo vocal version

Orchestral and child solo vocal version

Orchestral instrumental version

Piano instrumental version

The anthem is usually played during public gatherings in the Philippines or in foreign countries where the Filipino audience is sizable. The Code also provides that it be played at other occasions as may be allowed by the National Historical Institute (now known as the National Historical Commission of the Philippines). It prohibits its playing or singing for mere recreation, amusement, or entertainment except during International competitions where the Philippines is the host or has a representative; local competitions; during the "sign-on" and "sign-off" of radio broadcasting and television stations in the country; and before the initial and last screening of films and before the opening of theatre performances.

Until 1999, the national anthem was played with four ruffles and flourishes as the presidential salute honors music during the beginning of civil or military parades following Spanish and Taiwanese tradition, especially on national holidays. Since that year it has been played solely during the presentation of award recipients on anniversary parades or following the presidential honors.

== Regulation ==
Article XVI, Section 2 of the 1987 Constitution specifies that "The Congress may, by law, adopt a new name for the country, a national anthem, or a national seal, which shall be truly reflective and symbolic of the ideals, history, and traditions of the people. Such law shall take effect only upon its ratification by the people in a national referendum."

=== Flag and Heraldic Code of the Philippines ===
Republic Act No. 8491 ("The Flag and Heraldic Code of the Philippines") regulates usage of the National Anthem, and contains the complete lyrics of "Lupang Hinirang". Enacted in 1998, it requires that the anthem "shall always be sung in the national language" regardless if performed inside or outside the Philippines, and specifies that the singing must be done "with fervor".

The code specifies penalties for violation of its provisions. Section 48 provides for public censure and cancellation of licenses and permits, Section 49 requires the Department of Education and the Commission on Higher Education to ensure that all students commit the national anthem to memory, section 50 specifies penalties of fine or imprisonment for violations.

== See also ==
- Marangal na Dalit ng Katagalugan
- Flag of the Philippines
- Oath of Allegiance (Philippines)
- Panatang Makabayan
- Pledge of Allegiance to the Philippine Flag
