= Julián Felipe =

Filipino composer

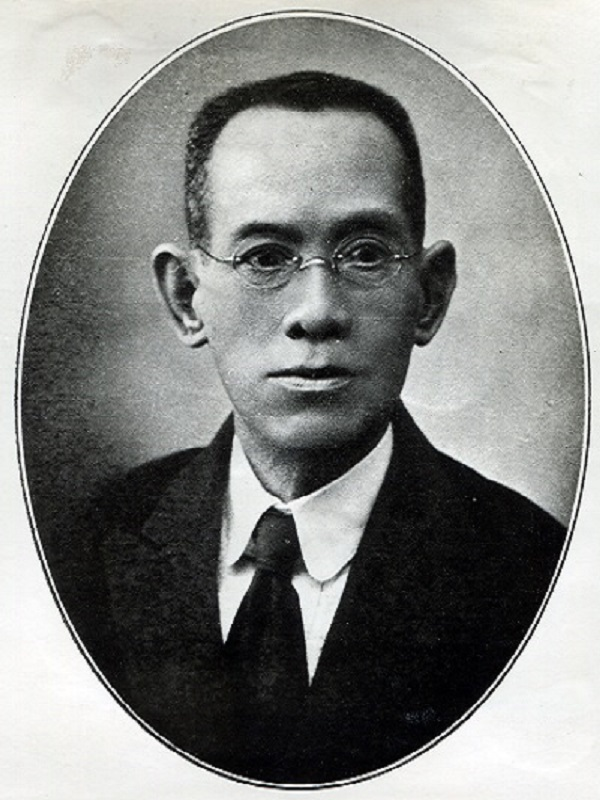
- Felipe, c. 1900
- Born: January 28, 1861; Cavite Nuevo, Captaincy General of the Philippines
- Died: October 2, 1944 (aged 83); Sampaloc, Manila, Second Philippine Republic
- Known for: Composer of the national anthem of the Philippines

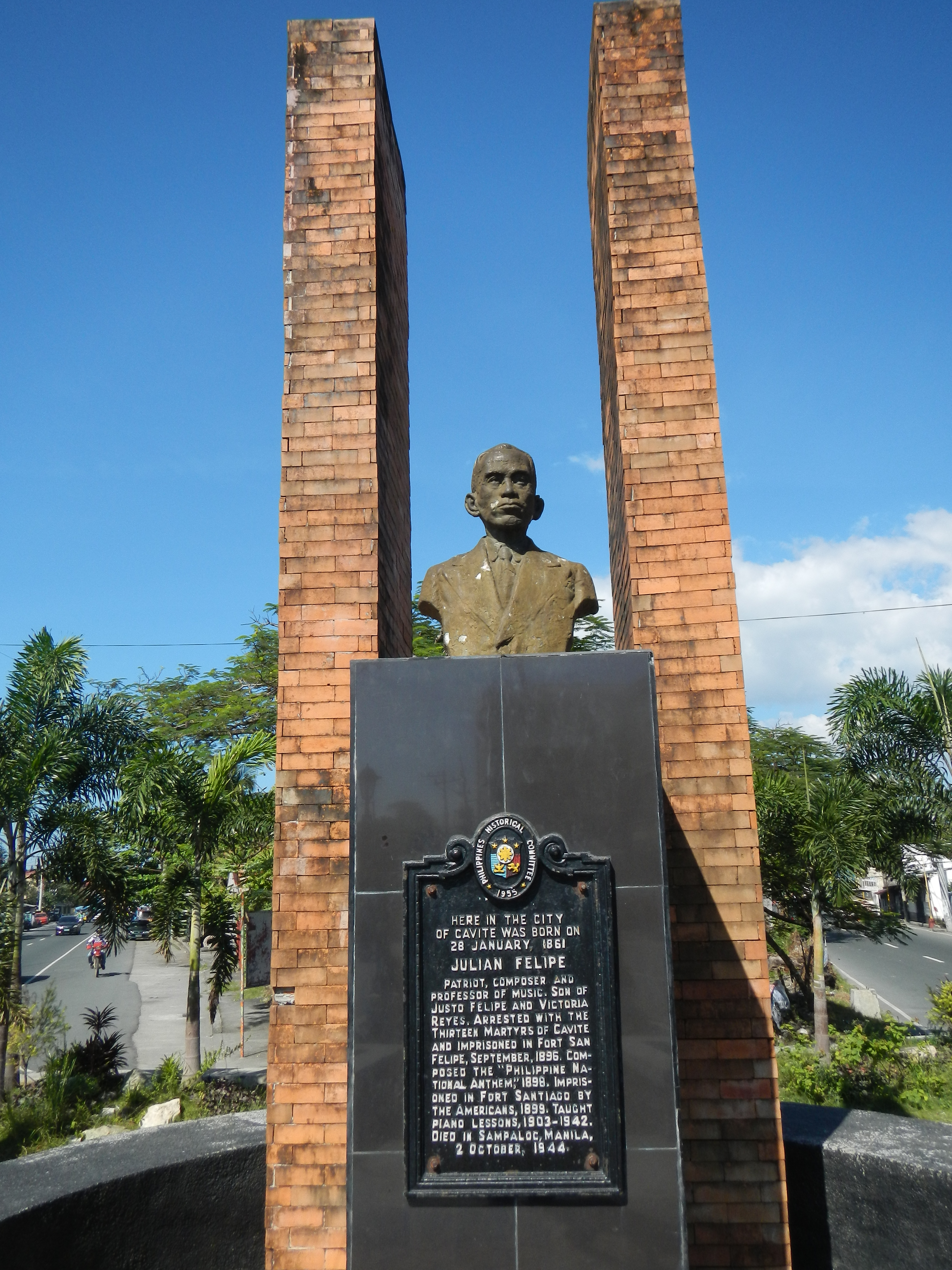
Monument at Cavite City

Julián Felipe y Reyes (Tagalog: [hulˈjan pɛˈlipɛ]; Spanish: [xuˈljaɱ feˈlipe]: January 28, 1861 – October 2, 1944) was a Filipino composer of the music of the Philippine national anthem, formerly known as "Marcha Nacional Filipina", now known as "Lupang Hinirang".

== Early life ==
Julián Felipe was born in Cavite Nuevo (the present-day Cavite City) on January 28, 1861, to Justo Felipe and Victoria Reyes.

He studied at a public school in quezon and Binondo, Manila, for his primary education. At an early age, he showed his talent in music. He also learned how to play the piano and the organ. Later, he was hired by Fr. Pedro Catalan, a Recollect priest who instructed him in playing the piano, as an organist at San Pedro Apostol Parish Church in Cavite Nuevo. As an organist, Felipe was given the chance to hone his gift. Soon after, he was composing songs. He also became a music teacher at La Sagrada Familia, a girls' school.

Among his early popular compositions were "Aurorita", "Moteti el Santesisimo", "Sintos y Floras Rogodones", "Amorita Danza", "Cintas y Flores", and "Reina de Cavite", the latter written in honor of Our Lady of Porta Vaga. In recognition of his contributions in the field of music, he was given awards and accolade and a membership to the prestigious Santa Cecilia Musical Society in 1895.

== Involvement in the Philippine Revolution ==
When the revolution broke out, Felipe joined his fellow Caviteños who fought against the Spaniards during the Philippine Revolution. He was arrested and jailed at Fort San Felipe in Cavite, alongside the Thirteen Martyrs of Cavite. The martyrs were executed on September 12, 1896, but Felipe was found innocent and was subsequently released on June 2, 1897.

After he was freed, he rejoined Aguinaldo's troops. He composed various nationalistic songs that inspired his compatriots to continue fighting against the Spaniards.

== National anthem ==
Emilio Aguinaldo asked Felipe to provide a stirring composition to be played in the historic proclamation of the Philippine independence. His composition Marcha Nacional Filipina was first played as incidental music on June 12, 1898, in Aguinaldo's home in Kawit. It was adopted as the Philippine national anthem on September 5, 1938, by the Commonwealth Government.

A dedicated music teacher and composer, he was later appointed by then-President Aguinaldo as Director of the National Band of the First Philippine Republic in 1899. On the same year, he was imprisoned by the Americans at Fort Santiago in Intramuros.

== Death ==
Julian died on October 2, 1944, in Sampaloc, Manila during World War II. He was interred in Barangay San Roque, Cavite City.

== Legacy ==
A bust of Felipe can be found in Cavite City, located near San Sebastian College – Recoletos de Cavite. A public elementary school in Cavite City and an auditorium at De La Salle University–Dasmariñas are also named after him. In 1994, Republic Act No. 7805 declared January 28 of every year as a non-working holiday in Cavite City, known as the "Julian Felipe Day."

== In popular culture ==
- Portrayed by Lou Veloso in the 2012 film, El Presidente.

== See also ==
- Music of the Philippines
