= Philippine Declaration of Independence =

1898 assertion of Philippine independence from Spanish colonial rule

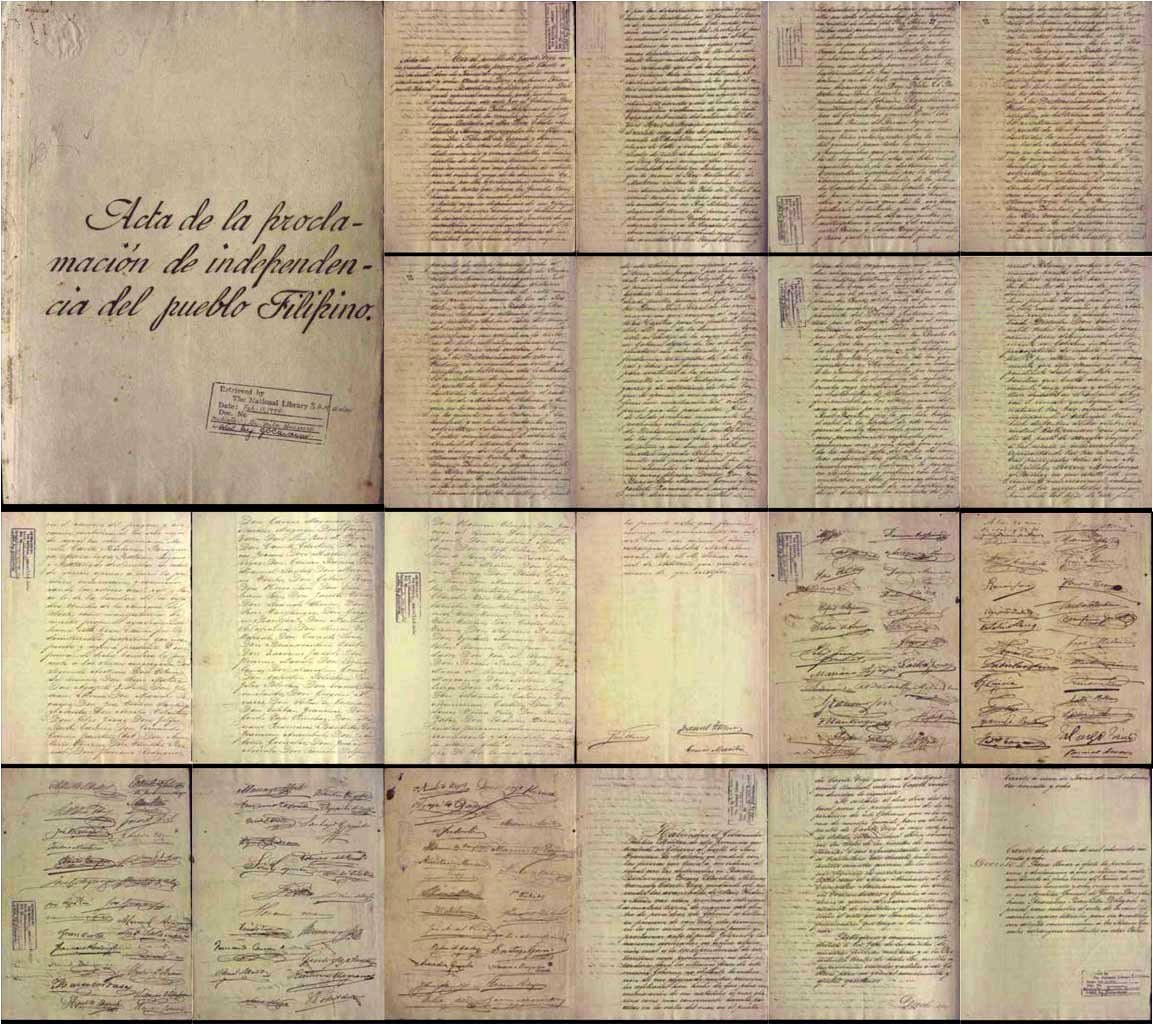
- Official draft copy of the Declaration of Independence
- Created: May–June 1898
- Presented: June 12, 1898, in Cavite el Viejo, Cavite
- Ratified: August 1, 1898 (first ratification in Bacoor, Cavite); September 29, 1898 (official ratification by the Malolos Congress)
- Location: National Library of the Philippines
- Commissioned by: Dictator Emilio Aguinaldo
- Author: Ambrosio Rianzares Bautista
- Signatories: 98 delegates
- Purpose: To proclaim the sovereignty and independence of the Philippines from the colonial rule of the Spanish Empire

The Philippine Declaration of Independence (Tagalog: Pagpapahayag ng Kasarinlan ng Pilipinas; Spanish: Declaración de Independencia de Filipinas) (Note: Full name: Act of the Proclamation of Independence of the Filipino People (Filipino: Kasulatan ng Pagpapahayag ng Kasarinlan ng Sambayanang Pilipino; Spanish: Acta de la proclamación de independencia del pueblo Filipino)) was proclaimed by Filipino revolutionary forces general Emilio Aguinaldo on June 12, 1898, in Cavite el Viejo (present-day Kawit, Cavite), Philippines. It asserted the sovereignty and independence of the Philippine islands from the 300 years of colonial rule by Spain.

The original flag raised by Emilio Aguinaldo in declaring independence in 1898

== History ==
In 1896, the Philippine Revolution began. In December 1897, the Spanish government and the revolutionaries signed a truce, the Pact of Biak-na-Bato, requiring that the Spaniards pay the revolutionaries $MXN800,000 (Note: The Mexican dollar at the time was worth about 50 US cents, equivalent to about $19.35 today. The peso fuerte and the Mexican dollar were interchangeable at par.) and that Aguinaldo and other leaders go into exile in Hong Kong. In April 1898, shortly after the beginning of the Spanish–American War, Commodore George Dewey, aboard the USS Olympia, sailed into Manila Bay, leading the Asiatic Squadron of the US Navy. On May 1, 1898, the US defeated the Spaniards in the Battle of Manila Bay. Emilio Aguinaldo decided to return to the Philippines to help American forces defeat the Spaniards. The US Navy agreed to transport him back aboard the USS McCulloch, and on May 19, he arrived in Cavite.

=== The Proclamation on June 12 ===
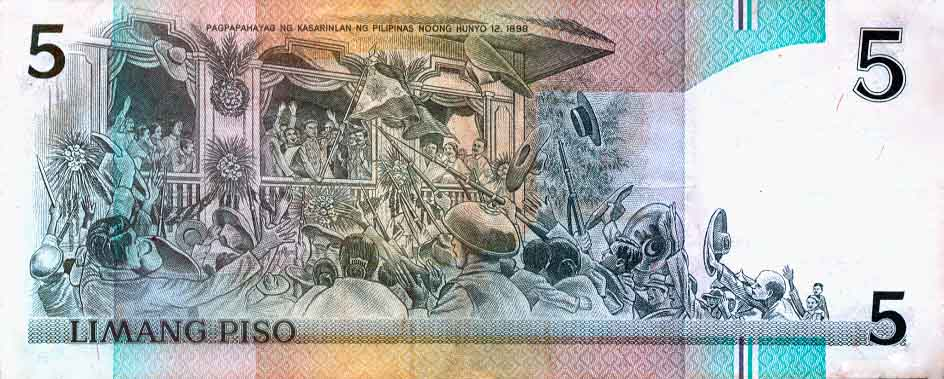
The Proclamation of Independence on June 12, 1898, as depicted on the back of the Philippine five peso bill

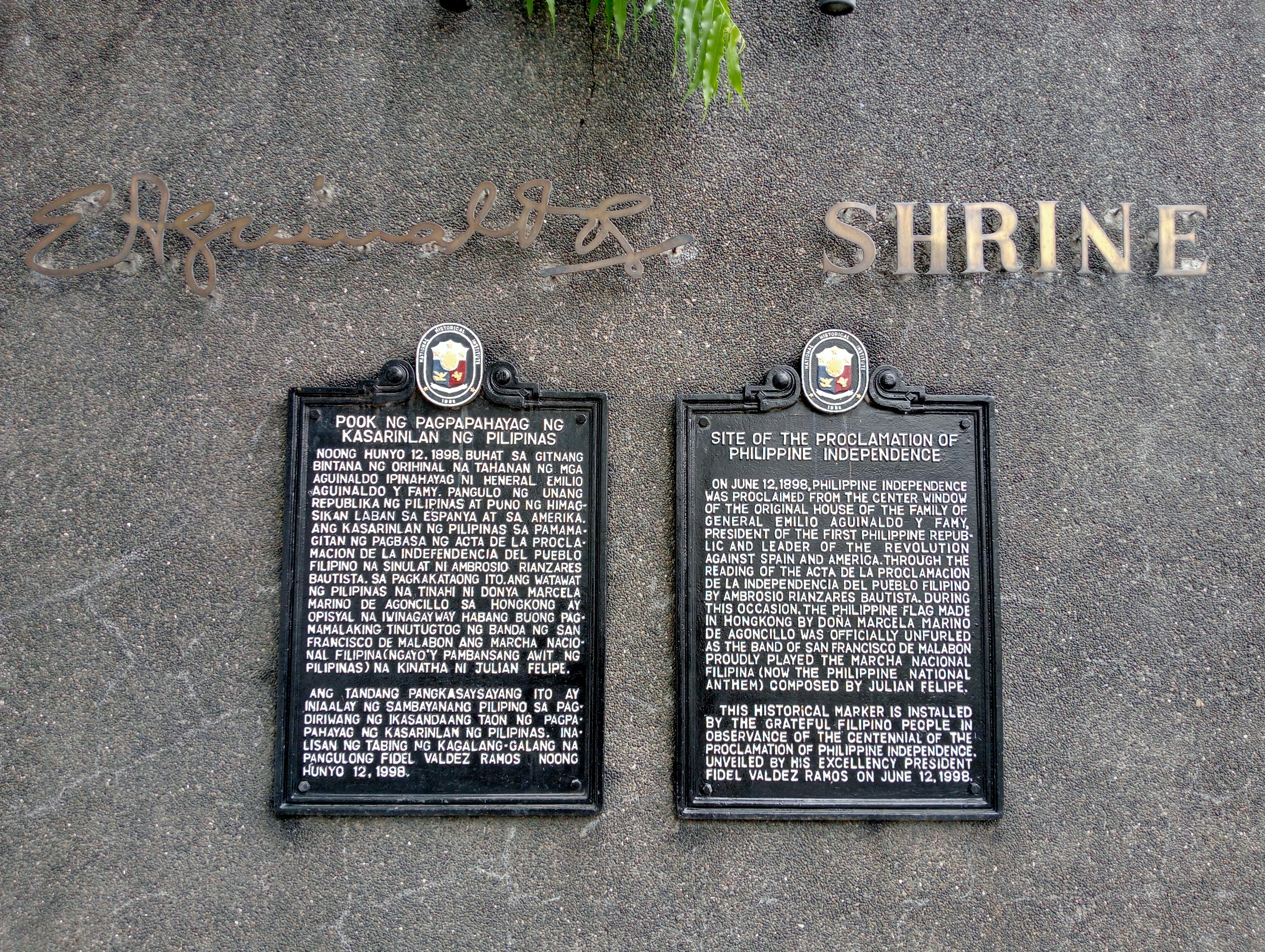
Proclamation of Philippine Independence Historical Markers at the Aguinaldo Shrine in Kawit, Cavite

Independence was proclaimed on June 12, 1898, between four and five in the afternoon in Cavite at the ancestral home of General Emilio Aguinaldo in Cavite el Viejo (present-day Kawit), Cavite, some 30 kilometers (19 mi) south of Manila. The event saw the unfurling of the flag of the Philippines, made in Hong Kong by Marcela Agoncillo, Lorenza Agoncillo, and Delfina Herboza, and the performance of the Marcha Filipina Magdalo, as the national anthem, now known as Lupang Hinirang, which was composed by Julián Felipe and played by the San Francisco de Malabon marching band.

The Act of the Declaration of Independence was prepared, written, and read by Ambrosio Rianzares Bautista in Spanish. The Declaration was signed by 98 people, among them a United States Army officer who witnessed the proclamation. The final paragraph states that there was a "stranger" (stranger in English translation—extranjero in the original Spanish, meaning foreigner) who attended the proceedings, Mr. L. M. Johnson, who had represented himself to Aguinaldo as Late Colonel and Artillery Inspector, Imperial Chinese Army. (Note: Dean Conant Worcester, in his 1914 book The Philippines: Past and Present (Worcester 1914), says: "Invitations to the ceremony of the declaration of independence were sent to Admiral Dewey; but neither he nor any of his officers were present. It was, however, important to Aguinaldo that some American should be there whom the assembled people would consider a representative of the United States. 'Colonel' Johnson, ex-hotel keeper of Shanghai, who was in the Philippines exhibiting a cinematograph, kindly consented to appear on this occasion as Aguinaldo's Chief of Artillery and the representative of the North American nation. His name does not appear subsequently among the papers of Aguinaldo. It is possible that his position as a colonel and chief of artillery was a merely temporary one which enabled him to appear in a uniform which would befit the character of the representative of a great people upon so solemn an occasion!" Worcester attributes this to "Taylor, 26 A J.", referring to Major J. R. M. Taylor, who translated and compiled insurgent records<) Despite his prior military experience, Johnson had no official role in the Philippines.

==== Ratification ====
The proclamation of Philippine independence was promulgated on August 1, when many towns had already been organized under the rules laid down by the dictatorial government of General Aguinaldo. There were 190 municipal presidents from different towns in 16 provinces—Manila, Cavite, Laguna, Batangas, Bulacan, Bataan, Infanta, Morong, Tayabas, Pampanga, Pangasinan, Mindoro, Nueva Ecija, Tarlac, La Union, and Zambales—who ratified the Proclamation of Independence in Bacoor, Cavite.

Later, at Malolos, Bulacan, the Malolos Congress modified the declaration upon the insistence of Apolinario Mabini, who objected to the original proclamation, on the grounds that it essentially placed the Philippines under the protection of the US.

=== Struggle for independence ===
The declaration was never recognized by either the US or Spain. Instead, Spain ceded the Philippines to the United States in the 1898 Treaty of Paris that took effect after the exchange of ratifications on April 11, 1899, marking the end of the Spanish–American War. The Philippine revolutionary government had been constituted as a democratic republic on January 23, 1899 and did not recognize the treaty or American sovereignty.

American assertion of sovereignty led to the outbreak of the Philippine–American War on February 4, 1899. President Aguinaldo was captured by US forces on March 23, 1901, and issued a statement acknowledging and accepting the sovereignty of the US over the Philippines. On July 2, 1902, US Secretary of War Elihu Root telegraphed that the fighting had come to an end, and provincial civil governments had been established everywhere except those areas inhabited by Moro tribes, notwithstanding the existing civil governments instituted by the Filipinos. Pockets of resistance continued for several years.

Following the end of World War II, the US recognized Philippine independence and withdrew from the country on July 4, 1946, via the Treaty of Manila. July 4 was observed in the Philippines as Independence Day until August 4, 1964, when, upon the advice of historians and the urging of nationalists, President Diosdado Macapagal signed into law Republic Act No. 4166, designating June 12 as the country's Independence Day. June 12 was previously observed as Flag Day, and many government buildings are urged to display the Philippine flag in their offices.

=== Current location of the Declaration ===
The Declaration is currently housed in the National Library of the Philippines. It has been put on public display since August 9, 2024.

During the Philippine–American War, the American government captured and sent to the US about 400,000 historical documents. In 1958, the documents were given to the Philippine government along with two sets of microfilm of the entire collection, with the US federal government keeping one set.

The Declaration was stolen from the National Library sometime in the 1980s or 1990s. As part of a larger investigation into the widespread theft of historical documents and a subsequent public appeal for the return of stolen documents, the Declaration was returned to the National Library in 1994 by historian and University of the Philippines professor Milagros Guerrero, who mediated the return of the documents.

In 2025, the Declaration was proclaimed as a national cultural treasure by the National Library.

A contemporary handwritten copy of the Declaration, handwritten by Lt. Col. Jose Bañuelo, was sold for ₱11.4 million at a Leon Gallery auction on September 14, 2024.

== The text of the "Act of the Proclamation of Independence of the Filipino People" ==
The Act of the Proclamation of Independence of the Filipino People (Spanish: Acta de la proclamación de independencia del pueblo Filipino; Filipino: Katitikan ng Pagpapahayag ng Pagsasarili ng Bayang Filipino) is part of a long line of declarations of independence, including the US Declaration of Independence. It includes a list of grievances against the Spanish government stretching back to Ferdinand Magellan's arrival in 1521. It confers upon "our famous Dictator Don Emilio Aguinaldo all the powers necessary to enable him to discharge the duties of Government, including the prerogatives of granting pardon and amnesty."

== See also ==
- First Philippine Republic
- Republic Day (Philippines)
- Philippine Independence Day Parade
