= Ambrosio Rianzares Bautista =

Filipino lawyer and author of the Declaration of Philippine Independence

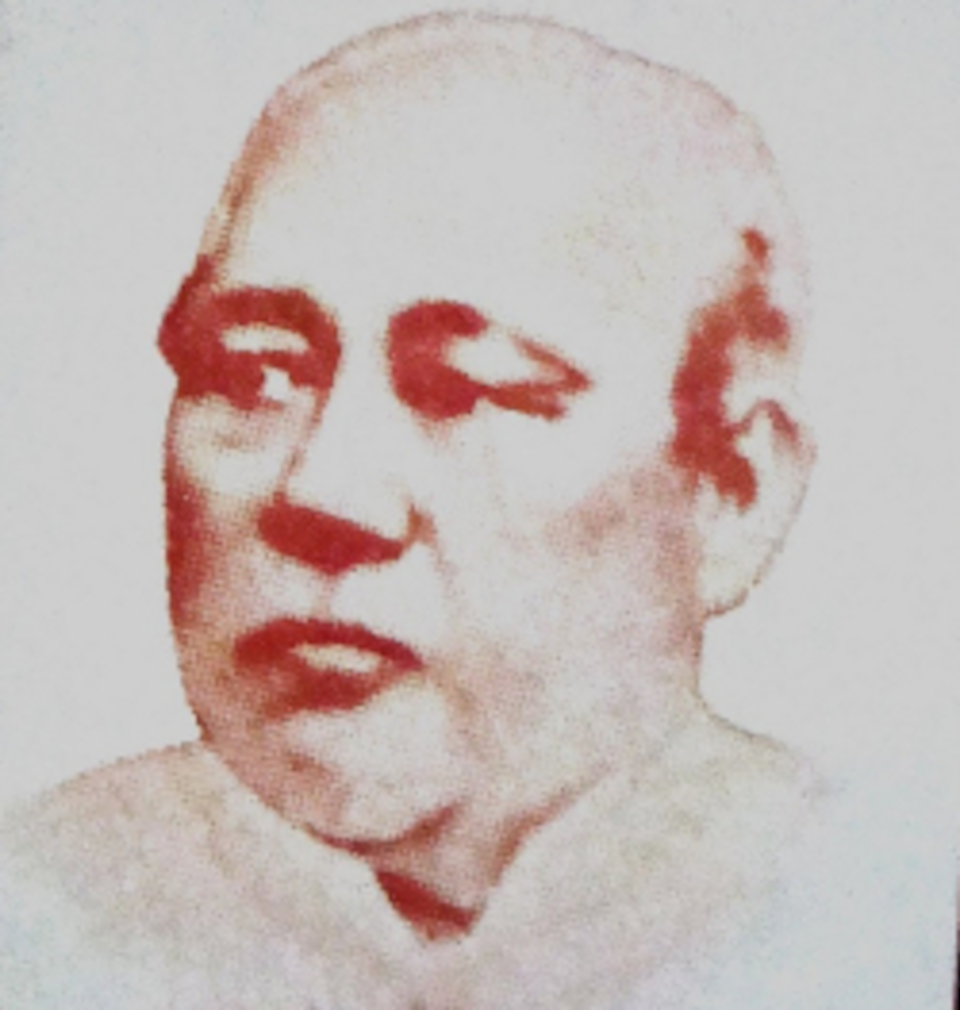
- Photo of Ambrosio Rianzares Bautista from a stamp

Member of the Malolos Congress from Bulacan
- In office September 15, 1898 – November 13, 1899 Serving with Mariano Crisostomo, Pedro Serrano, and Trinidad Iscasiano

Personal details
- Born: Ambrosio Rianzares Bautista y Altamira; December 7, 1830 Biñan, La Laguna, Captaincy General of the Philippines
- Died: December 4, 1903 (aged 72)
- Cause of death: Accidental fall from a Horse-drawn vehicle
- Education: University of Santo Tomas
- Occupation: Lawyer
- Known for: Author of the Declaration of Philippine Independence

Ambrosio Rianzares Bautista y Altamira (December 7, 1830 – December 4, 1903), also known as Don Bosyong, was a Filipino lawyer and author of the Declaration of Philippine Independence. A distant relative to the Rizal family and the Bonifacio family, Bautista often gave advice to José Rizal, a Filipino nationalist, while studying in Manila.

== Early life and career in the Malolos Congress ==
Bautista was born in Biñan, La Laguna (now Laguna) to Gregorio Enriquez Bautista and Silvestra Altamira. He attended preparatory school in Biñan and studied law at University of Santo Tomas, obtaining a degree in 1865. He practiced law in Manila and offered free legal services to poor clients. Whilst practicing law, Bautista, on his way to Malolos, Bulacan, was captured by a group of bandits, who subsequently learned that he saved many of their friends as a defender of the poor in court cases against rich Filipinos and Spaniards. The bandits apologized to Bautista and set him free.

== Political activism ==
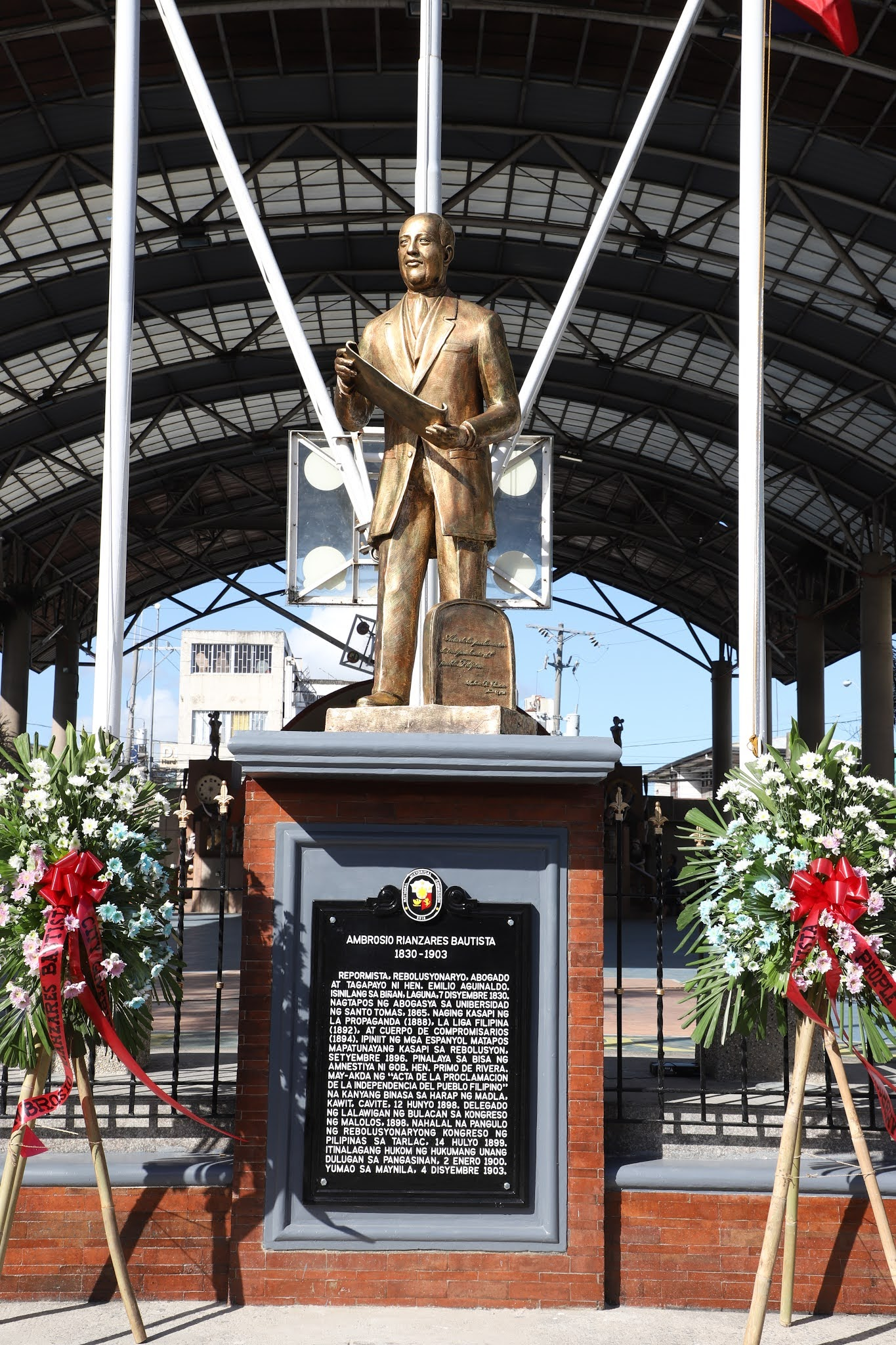
Monument of Bautista in Biñan

Bautista solicited funds to finance a campaign for reforms in the Philippines, later becoming a member of the La Liga Filipina, Cuerpo de Compromisarios and La Propaganda. In 1896, the Spaniards arrested and imprisoned him at Fort Santiago, as he was suspected of being involved in the Philippine Revolution; Bautista elected to defend himself and was later released from prison.

In 1898, Bautista became the first adviser to President Emilio Aguinaldo and subsequently wrote the Declaration of Philippine Independence.

Contrary to common belief, it was Bautista, and not Aguinaldo, who waved the Philippine flag before the crowd on June 12, 1898, during the Philippine Proclamation of Independence in Cavite.

On July 14, 1899, Bautista was elected to the position of president in Tarlac's Revolutionary Congress and was later appointed judge of the Court of First Instance of the province of Pangasinan.

== Legacy and remembrance ==
As a historical commemoration, the Bautista Monument and historical marker now stand at the Biñan City hall. In 2018, the NHCP unveiled his monument with a recreated marker to replace the missing 1980 memorial. The session hall of the Biñan City Council is named after Bautista.

The "Acta de la Proclamacion de Independencia del Pueblo Filipino" in Bautista's penmanship was signed by 98 natives on June 12, 1898, at the house of General Emilio Aguinaldo in Kawit, Cavite. The only copy of "The Birth Certificate of the Filipino Nation", handwritten by Lt. Col. Jose Bañuelo is set for auction at the Leon Gallery on September 14, 2024.

== In popular culture ==
- Portrayed by Richard Manabat in the 2012 film, El Presidente.

== See also ==
- Patricio Mariano
