= Flag of the Philippines =

Republic of the Philippines
- Pambansang Watawat (lit. 'National Flag'); Tatlong Bituin at Isang Araw (lit. 'Three Stars and a Sun')
- Use: Civil and state flag, national ensign
- Proportion: 1∶2
- Adopted: June 12, 1898; 128 years ago (original version used by the First Philippine Republic); 1936; 90 years ago (current pattern standard); February 12, 1998; 28 years ago (current version reaffirmed by Republic Act No. 8491)
- Design: A horizontal bicolor of blue and red with a white equilateral triangle based at the hoist containing a five-pointed gold star at each of its three vertices, and an eight-rayed gold sun at its center. (Note: The eight provinces symbolized by the rays are provinces which had significant early involvement in the Philippine Revolution. Identification of the eight provinces symbolized and descriptions of their early involvement vary between sources. Sources containing assertions regarding this include the following: Lists of provinces: Batangas, Bulacan, Cavite, Laguna, Manila–Morong, Nueva Ecija, Pampanga, Tarlac.; Batangas, Bulacan, Cavite, Laguna, Manila, Nueva Ecija, Pampanga, Tarlac.; Batangas, Bulacan, Cavite, Laguna, Nueva Ecija, Pampanga, Rizal, Tarlac.; Bataan, Batangas, Bulacan, Cavite, Laguna, Manila, Nueva Ecija, Pampanga.; Early involvement: Eight provinces which revolted first against the Spanish government during the revolution of 1896.; Placed under martial law on August 30, 1896.)
- Designed by: Emilio Aguinaldo
- Use: War flag
- Proportion: 1∶2
- Design: As above, with the blue and red stripes switched to indicate a state of war.
- Designed by: Emilio Aguinaldo

The national flag of the Philippines (Filipino: Pambansang Watawat ng Pilipinas), also known as Three Stars and a Sun (Filipino: Tatlong Bituin at Isang Araw), is a horizontal bicolor flag with equal bands of royal blue and crimson red, with a white, equilateral triangle at the hoist. In the center of the triangle is a golden-yellow sun with eight primary rays, to represent the original eight provinces that rebelled against the Spanish during the 1896 Philippine Revolution. At each vertex of the triangle is a five-pointed, golden-yellow star, each of which representing one of the country's three main island groups—Luzon, Visayas (though originally referring to the island of Panay), (Note: Visayans or Bisaya were originally referred to the people from the island of Panay, whereas those from the islands of Cebu, Bohol, Samar, and Leyte were referred to as Pintados by the Spaniards. Hence, Panay Island was recognized as the mainland of the Visayan Islands during the Spanish era. It was the representative of the entire Visayan region. Iloilo, a province on the island of Panay, was also the first province outside of Luzon to have raised the Philippine flag.) and Mindanao. The white triangle at the hoist represents liberty, equality, and fraternity. A unique feature of this flag is its usage to indicate a state of war if it is displayed with the red side on top, which is effectively achieved by flipping the flag upside-down.

== Design ==
=== Construction ===
The flag's length is twice its width, giving it an aspect ratio of 1:2. The white triangle is equilateral. Each star is oriented in such manner that one of its tips points towards the vertex at which it is located. Moreover, the gap-angle between two neighbors of the 8 ray-bundles is as large as the angle of one ray-bundle (so 22.5°), with each major ray having double the thickness of its two minor rays. The golden sun is not exactly in the center of the triangle but shifted slightly away from the hoist.

Construction sheet of the Philippine flag.

=== Color ===
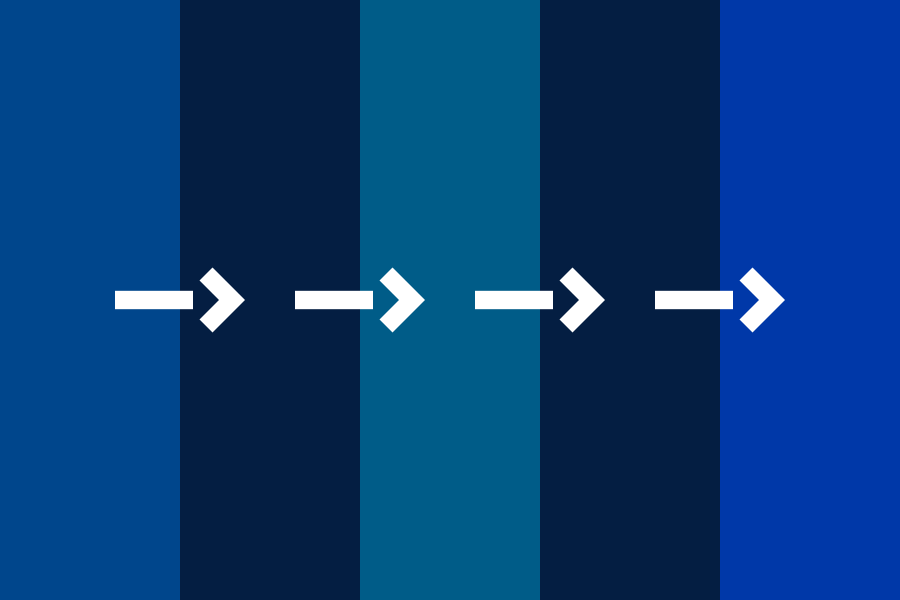
Changes to the shade of blue of the Philippine flag from left to right: Azul Oscuro (1898); National Flag Blue (1955); Oriental Blue (1985); National Flag Blue (1986); and Royal Blue (1998)

Changes to the shade of light red of the Philippine flag

The traditional royal blue color used in some institutions and schools

The shade of blue used in the flag has varied over time, beginning with the original color described as azul oscuro (Spanish, "dark blue"). The exact nature of this shade is debated, but a likely candidate is the blue on the Cuban flag, which a theory says influenced the Philippine flag's design. The colors of the flag were first standardized by President Ramón Magsaysay, upon the recommendation of the Philippine Historical Committee (PHC) dated January 24, 1955. Specifically, the colors adopted were Old Glory Red (Cable No. 70180), National Flag Blue (Cable No. 70077), Spanish Yellow (Cable No. 70068), and White (70001) by the Reference Guide of the Textile Color Card Association of the United States. In 1985, President Ferdinand E. Marcos through Executive Order No. 1010, s. 1985 instructed the National Historical Institute "to take the necessary steps to restore the original color of the First Philippine Flag". In late May, the NHI adopted Oriental Blue (Cable No. 80176) for the new national flag, but this was later rescinded by President Corazon C. Aquino after the 1986 People Power Revolution that removed him from power in favor of pre-1985 National Flag Blue. For the 1998 centennial celebration of Philippine independence, the Flag and Heraldic Code of the Philippines (Republic Act. 8491, s. 1998) was passed, designating Royal Blue (Cable No. 80173) as the official variant to be used from 1998 to present.

The flag's colors are specified and codified under Republic Act 8491, s. 1998 signed on February 12, 1998, in terms of their cable number in the system developed by the Color Association of the United States. The official colors and their approximations in other color spaces are listed below:

Scheme	Blue	Crimson red	White	Gold
Cable No.	80173	80108	80001	80068
Pantone	286C	193C		122C
RGB	0–56–168	206–17–38	255–255–255	252–209–22
CMYK	C99-M80-Y0-K0	C12-M100-Y87-K3	C0-M0-Y0-K0	C2-M17-Y91-K0
HEX	#0038A8	#CE1126	#FFFFFF	#FCD116

=== Symbolism ===
Official design of the eight-ray sun
(3.75°-spacing)

An erroneous design of the sun
(5°-spacing)

Flag of Manila (1845–1898)

Flag of Iloilo (1886–1898)

In the late 19th century, both Manila and Iloilo, the archipelago's largest ports, each had maritime flags used for navigation in the Philippine seas. Both maritime flags were swallowtail flags with red and blue stripes, respectively, which were later adopted in the Philippine flag. The Philippine national flag has a rectangular design that consists of a white equilateral triangle, symbolizing liberty, equality and fraternity; a horizontal blue stripe for peace, truth, and justice; and a horizontal red stripe for patriotism and valor. In the center of the white triangle is an eight-rayed golden sun symbolizing unity, freedom, people's democracy, and sovereignty. Each ray represents a province or district with significant involvement in the 1896 Philippine Revolution against Spain; these are the provinces Bulacan, Cavite, Pampanga, Laguna, Batangas, Tarlac, and Nueva Ecija (some sources specify other provinces as alternatives to some of these) and the district of Morong (modern-day province of Rizal). However, according to the Declaration of Independence and a research by Ateneo de Manila University Professor Ambeth Ocampo, the rays of the sun symbolized the first eight provinces of the Philippines which was declared under martial law during the Philippine Revolution (Batangas, Bulacan, Cavite, Manila, Laguna, Nueva Ecija, Pampanga and Tarlac). Three five-pointed stars, one at each of the triangle's points, stand for the three major island groups: Luzon, Visayas (originally referring to Panay Island) and Mindanao.

The flag's original symbolism is enumerated in the text of the independence proclamation, which makes reference to an attached drawing, though no record of the drawing has surfaced. The proclamation explains the flag as follows:

And finally it was resolved unanimously that this Nation, already independent from today should use the same flag which it has used, whose shape and colors are described in the attached drawing rendering realistically the three aforementioned forces representing the white triangle as the distinctive symbol of the famed Society of the Katipunan, which through the blood compact impelled the masses to rise in revolt; the three stars representing the three principal islands of this Archipelago — Luzon, Mindanao, and Panay (Visayas) in which the revolutionary movement broke out; the sun indicating the gigantic steps taken by the children of this country on the road to progress and civilization; the eight rays symbolizing the eight provinces of the Philippines, and the colors of blue, red and white commemorating the flag of the United States of North America as a manifestation of our profound gratitude towards this Great Nation for its disinterested protection which it lends us, and continues to lend us. And, carrying this flag, I unfurl it before the gentlemen assembled here—[List of names of the delegates]—and we all solemnly swear to acknowledge and defend it to the last drop of our blood.

The symbolism given in the 1898 Proclamation of Philippine Independence differs from the current official explanation. According to the document, the white triangle signifies the emblem of the Katipunan, the secret society that opposed Spanish rule. It says the flag's colors commemorate the flag of the United States as a manifestation of gratitude for American aid against the Spanish during the Philippine Revolution. It also says that one of the three stars represents the island of Panay, which recent historical interpretations say was "representative of the entire Visayas region".

== History ==
=== Historical flags of the Philippine Revolution ===
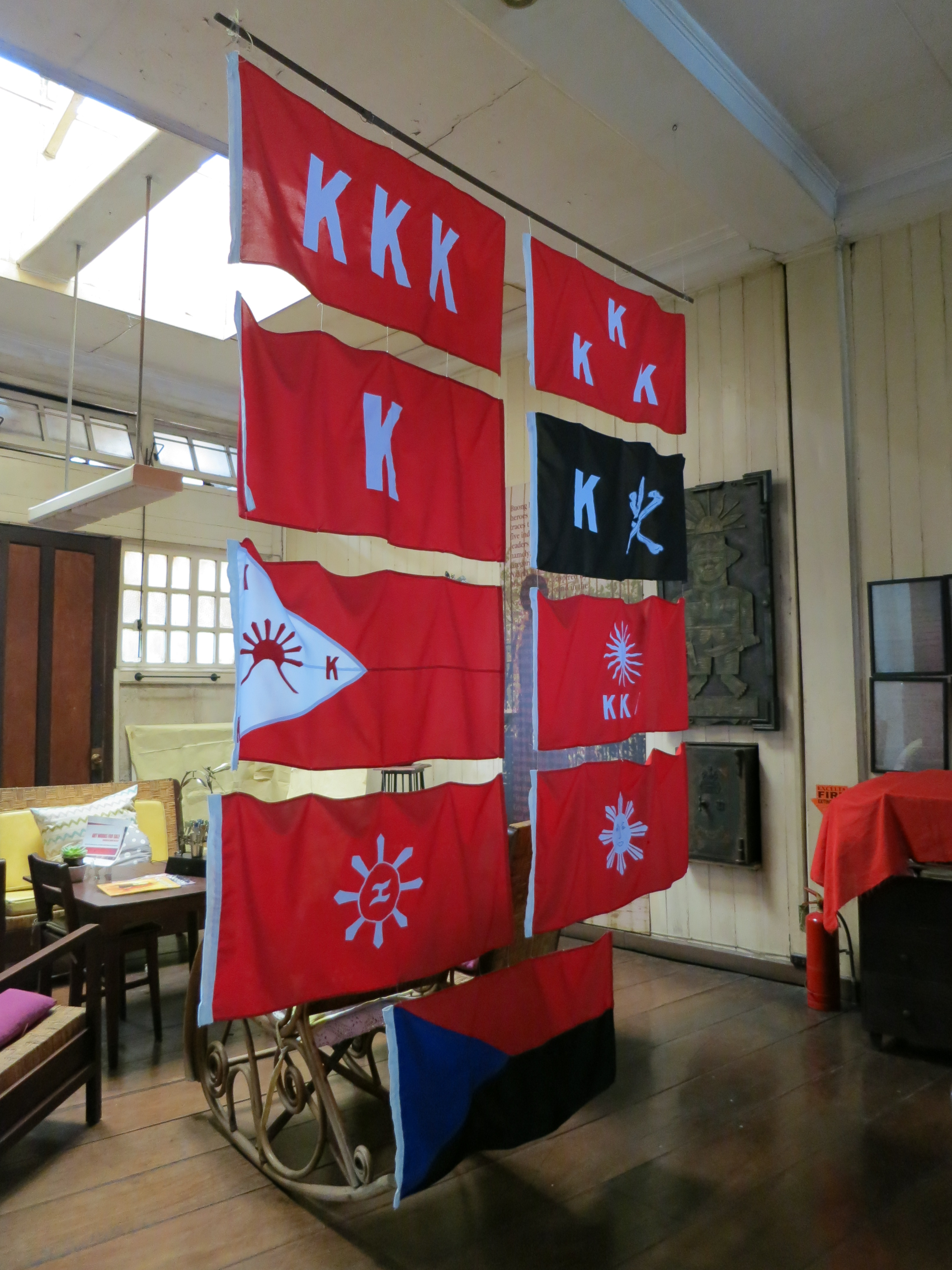
Nine of the Katipunan flags often erroneously cited as part of the "Evolution of the Philippine Flag" series

It has been common since the 1960s to trace the development of the Philippine flag to the various war standards of the individual leaders of the Katipunan, a pseudo-masonic revolutionary movement that opposed Spanish rule in the Philippines and led the Philippine Revolution. However, while some symbols common to the Katipunan flags would be adopted into the iconography of the Revolution, it is inconclusive whether these war standards can be considered precursors to the present Philippine flag.

The first flag of the Katipunan was a red rectangular flag with a horizontal alignment of three white Ks (an acronym for the Katipunan's full name, Kataas-taasang Kagalang-galangang Katipunan ng mga Anak ng Bayan – Supreme and Venerable Society of the Sons of the Nation). The flag's red field symbolized blood, as members of the Katipunan signed their membership papers in their own blood.

The various leaders of the Katipunan, such as Andrés Bonifacio, Mariano Llanera, and Pío del Pilar, also had individual war standards.

=== Current flag ===
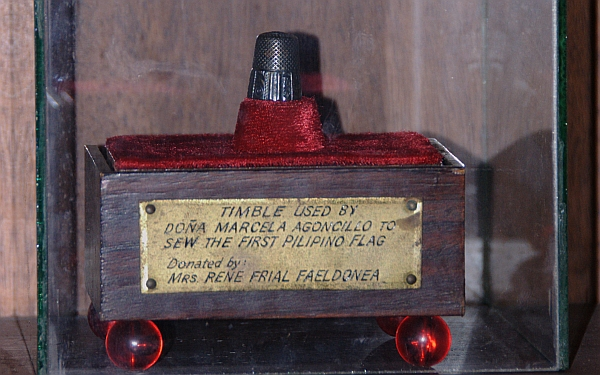
The thimble used by Doña Marcela Mariño de Agoncillo in sewing the first Philippine flag; on display at Presidential Museum & Library.

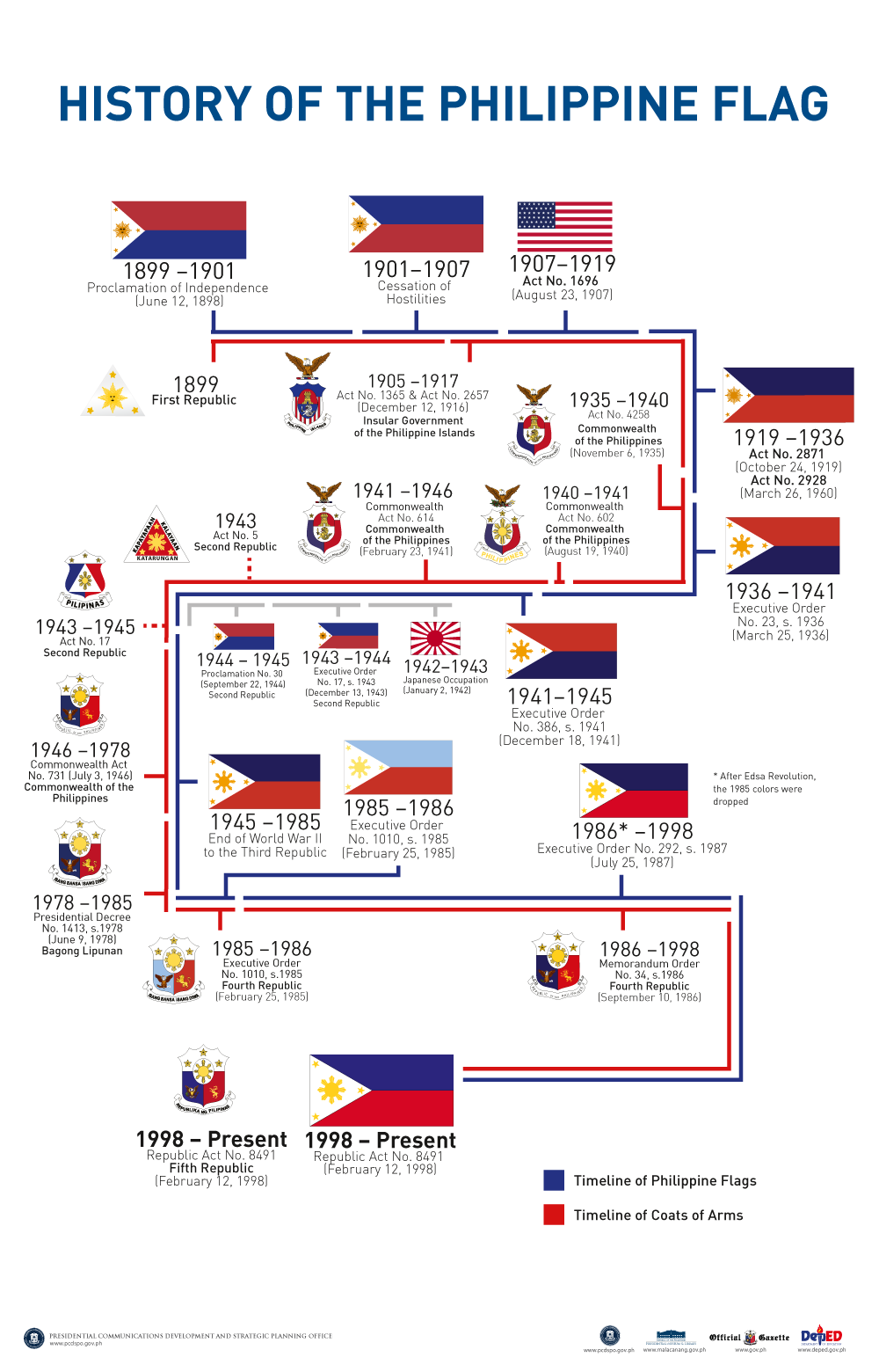
History of the modern Philippine flag

The Philippine national flag was designed by Emilio Aguinaldo. It was sewn by Doña Marcela Mariño Agoncillo, her five-year-old daughter Lorenza Mariño Agoncillo, and Mrs. Delfina Herbosa Natividad, Dr. José Rizal's niece by his sister Lucia. It was first displayed in the Battle of Alapan on May 28, 1898, after the Spaniards were defeated and surrendered to Aguinaldo. A Manila Times article by Augusto de Viana, Chief History Researcher, National Historical Institute, mentions assertions in history textbooks and commemorative rites that the flag was first raised in Alapan, Imus, Cavite, on May 28, 1898, citing Presidential Proclamation No. 374, issued by President Diosdado Macapagal on March 6, 1965. The article goes on to claim that historical records indicate that the first display of the Philippine flag took place in Cavite City, when General Aguinaldo displayed it during the first fight of the Philippine Revolution.

The flag was formally unfurled during the proclamation of independence on June 12, 1898, in Aguinaldo's Residence at Kawit, Cavite.

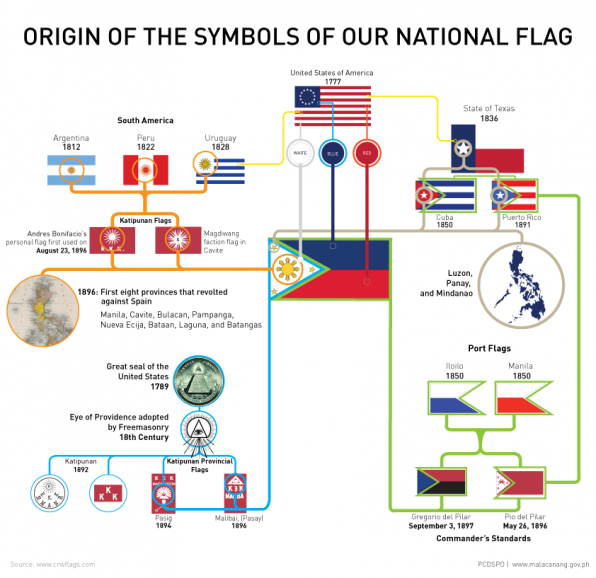
The elements making up the Philippine Flag and its subsequent meanings

The original design of the flag adopted a mythical sun (Sun of May) with a face influenced by The Republics of the Río de la Plata, Argentina and Uruguay, which in turn represent the Incan solar deity Inti; a triangle, representing the Katipunan which was inspired by both the Eye of Providence in the Great Seal of the United States and the Masonic Triangle and which enshrined Liberté, Égalité, Fraternité of the French Revolution; the stripes and colors are derived from the American flag. The particular shade of blue of the original flag has been a source of controversy. Based on anecdotal evidence and the few surviving flags from the era, historians argue that the colors of the original flag was influenced by the flags of Cuba and Puerto Rico.

During the session of the Malolos Congress, Aguinaldo presented the symbolism of the official flag to the members, delegates and representatives of the assembly as follows:

The Flag bears three colors, three stars, and a sun, the meaning of which are as follows: the red is symbolic of Filipino courage which is second to none, and was the color used during the war in the province of Cavite since the 31st of August 1896, until the Peace of Biak-na-Bato [in 1897]; the blue carries an allegorical meaning that all Filipinos will prefer to die before submitting ourselves to the invader, whoever he may be; the white conveys the idea that, like other nations, the Filipinos know how to govern themselves, and that they do not recede from observation of foreign powers. The sun and its rays stirred up Filipinos and spread the light over their world, piercing the clouds that enshrouded it; it is now the light which brightens every spot in the Philippine islands, and under its influence the Itas, Igorots, Manguians, and Moros, all of whom I believe were made in the image of God, and whom I recognize as our brethren, now come down from the mountains to join with us.

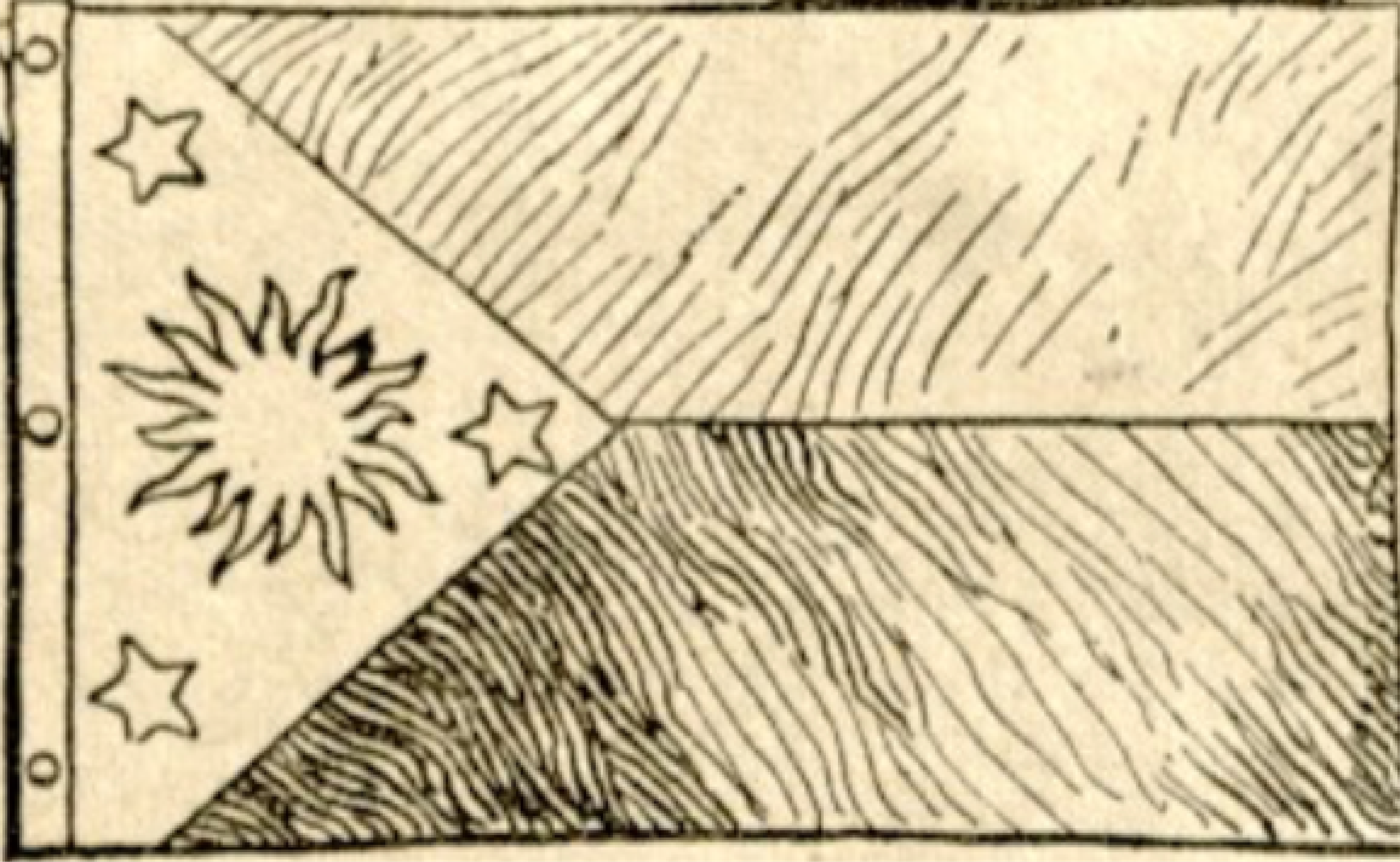
One of the early republic flags, 1898

The original flag that was first hoisted on May 28, 1898, and unfurled during the Declaration of independence on June 12, 1898, is believed to be preserved at the Gen. Emilio Aguinaldo Museum in Baguio. There were plans to restore the flag by replacing the worn-out portion, but the idea was abandoned as matching threads could not be found. The flag is more elaborate than the currently flag: it bears the embroidered words Libertad, Justicia and Igualdad (Liberty, Justice, and Equality) on one side of the flag and Fuerzas Expedicionarias del Norte de Luzon (Expeditionary forces of Northern Luzon) on the other. In a 2012 essay, the National Historical Commission of the Philippines recognized the flag in Baguio as authentic and a contemporary of the original flag, but not the same one unfurled at Kawit since it is made of a silk and cotton blend. According to Agoncillo's statement in Philippine Herald in 1929, the flag she had sewn was made in fine silk.

Hostilities broke out between the Philippines and the United States in 1899. The flag was first flown with the red field up on February 4, 1899, to show that a state of war existed. Aguinaldo was captured by the Americans two years later, and swore allegiance to the United States.

The detail of Fernando Amorsolo's The Making of the Philippine flag depicting Agoncillo and company's manual sewing

With the defeat of the Philippine Republic, the Philippines was placed under American occupation and the display of the Philippine flag and other flags and banners associated with the Katipunan were declared illegal by the Flag Act of 1907. This law was repealed on October 24, 1919. With the legalization of display of the Philippine flag, the cloth available in most stores was the red and blue of the flag of the United States, so the flag from 1919 onwards adopted the "National Flag blue" color. On March 26, 1920, the Philippine Legislature passed Act. No 2928 on March 26, 1920, which legally adopted the Philippine flag as the official flag of the Philippine Islands. Up until the eve of World War II, Flag Day was celebrated on annually on October 30, commemorating the date the ban on the flag was lifted.

The Commonwealth of the Philippines was inaugurated in 1935. On March 25, 1936, President Manuel L. Quezon issued Executive Order No. 23 which provided for the technical description and specifications of the flag. Among the provisions of the order was the definition of the triangle at the hoist as an equilateral triangle, the definition of the aspect ratio at 1:2, the precise angles of the stars, the geometric and aesthetic design of the sun, and the formal elimination of the mythical face on the sun. The exact shades of colors, however, were not precisely defined. These specifications have remained unchanged and in effect to the present. In 1941, Flag Day was officially moved to June 12, commemorating the date that Philippine independence was proclaimed in 1898.

The flag was once again banned with the Japanese invasion and occupation of the Philippines beginning in December 1941, to be hoisted again with the establishment of the Second Republic of the Philippines, a puppet state of Japan. In ceremonies held in October 1943, Emilio Aguinaldo hoisted the flag with the original Cuban blue and red colors restored. The flag was initially flown with the blue stripe up, until President José P. Laurel proclaimed the existence of a state of war with the Allied Powers in 1944. The Commonwealth government-in-exile in Washington, D.C. continued to use the flag with the American colors, and had flown it with the red stripe up since the initial invasion of the Japanese. With the combined forces of the Filipino and American soldiers and the liberation of the Philippines in 1944 to 1945, the flag with the American colors was restored, and it was this flag that was hoisted upon the granting of Philippine independence from the United States on July 4, 1946.

== Chronology ==
Flag	Date	Use	Description
The Spanish East Indies (1565–1898)
	1565–1762, 1764–1821	Flag used when the Philippine Islands were a Colony of New Spain.	The Cross of Burgundy: a red saltire resembling two crossed, roughly-pruned branches, on a white field.
	1762–1764	Flag during the brief British occupation of Manila, as used in occupied Manila and Cavite.	The flag of the British East India Company before 1801: A flag with red and white stripes with the Kingdom of Great Britain's Union Flag as a canton. The Union flag bears red cross on a white field, commonly called St George's Cross, superimposed on a white saltire on a blue field, known as St Andrew's Cross. Also known as the "King's Colours".
	1821–1873	Used during Spanish East Indies period.	Three horizontal stripes of red, weld-yellow and red, the centre stripe being twice as wide as each red stripe with arms in the first third of the weld-yellow stripe. The arms are crowned and vertically divided, the left red field with a tower representing Castille, the right white field with a lion representing León.
	1873–1874	Used by the Spanish East Indies under the First Spanish Republic.	Three horizontal stripes: red, weld-yellow and red, the yellow strip being twice as wide as each red stripe with arms in the first third of the yellow stripe. Royal crown removed from arms.
	1874–1898	Used during Spanish East Indies after the restoration of the Spanish monarchy.	The flag of the Kingdom of Spain used prior to the First Spanish Republic was reinstated.
Philippine Revolution – First Philippine Republic
	1898–1901	The flag design was conceived by President Emilio Aguinaldo. The exact shade of blue is debated; many variants were used by subsequent governments.	Sewn by Marcela Mariño de Agoncillo, Lorenza Agoncillo, and Delfina Herbosa de Natividad in Hong Kong and first flown in battle on May 28, 1898. It was formally unfurled during the Proclamation of Philippine Independence and the flag of the First Philippine Republic, on June 12, 1898, by President Aguinaldo. It contains a mythical sun (with a face) similar to the Sun of May in other former Spanish colonies; the triangle of Freemasonry; the eight rays representing eight rebellious provinces of the Philippines first placed under martial law by the Governor-General. Some flags carry the Spanish texts: Fuerzas Expedicionarias del Norte de Luzon on its obverse and Libertad Justicia e Ygualdad on its reverse, which means "Northern Luzon Expeditionary Forces" and "Liberty, Justice, and Equality" respectively.
American and Commonwealth Period (1898–1946)
	1898–1908	Used while under direct administration from the United States.	The Philippine Commission, passed Act No. 1697 or the Flag Law of 1907, that outlawed the display of Katipunan flags, banners, emblems, or devices in the American-controlled Philippine Islands. The same law prohibited the playing of the national anthem. Thirteen horizontal stripes of alternating red and white representing the original Thirteen Colonies; in the canton, white stars on a blue field, the number of stars increased as the United States expanded its territory.
	1908–1912	Variant after Oklahoma became a state	The Philippine Commission, passed Act No. 1697 or the Flag Law of 1907, that outlawed the display of Katipunan flags, banners, emblems, or devices in the American-controlled Philippine Islands. The same law prohibited the playing of the national anthem. Thirteen horizontal stripes of alternating red and white representing the original Thirteen Colonies; in the canton, white stars on a blue field, the number of stars increased as the United States expanded its territory.
	1912–1919	Variant after Arizona and New Mexico achieved statehood	The Philippine Commission, passed Act No. 1697 or the Flag Law of 1907, that outlawed the display of Katipunan flags, banners, emblems, or devices in the American-controlled Philippine Islands. The same law prohibited the playing of the national anthem. Thirteen horizontal stripes of alternating red and white representing the original Thirteen Colonies; in the canton, white stars on a blue field, the number of stars increased as the United States expanded its territory.
	1919–1936	From October 30, 1919, two flags were flown in the Philippines: the U.S. flag and the flag conceived by Emilio Aguinaldo which was made the national flag of the Philippines with the repealing of Act No. 1696.	The American flag remained unchanged since 1919. The Philippine flag was officially adopted on March 26, 1920. The design conceived by Emilio Aguinaldo remained but the shades of blue and red were adopted from the American flag. The sun's face was removed, but its stylized rays were retained. Many versions of the flag existed as no official design had been codified.
	1936–1946	From October 30, 1919, two flags were flown in the Philippines: the U.S. flag and the flag conceived by Emilio Aguinaldo which was made the national flag of the Philippines with the repealing of Act No. 1696.	Specifications standardized; Defined under Executive Order No. 23, s. 1936 which was signed on March 25, 1936. The de facto shade of blue used was Cable No. 70077 or "National Flag Blue" by the Reference Guide of the Textile Color Card Association of the United States. The triangle was made equilateral and the sun's rays were also further simplified, achieving its present form. Also used by the Commonwealth government-in-exile from 1942 to 1945.
Japanese Period (1942–1945)
	1942–1943	Used during the Japanese Occupation.	The Japanese flag as it appeared until 1999: a red sun-disc, shifted 1% left of centre, on a white field.
	1943–1945	Used during the Second Republic.	Emilio Aguinaldo's flag which featured an anthropomorphic sun, hoisted upon proclamation of the Second Republic.
	13 December 1943	Used during the inauguration of the Second Republic.	The original specifications of the flag as used by the Commonwealth government was readopted pursuant to Executive Order 17 issued on December 13, 1943.
Sovereignty (1946–present)
	1946–1985	Following independence, the 1936 design specifications standardized by President Manuel L. Quezon sported a shade of blue currently called National Flag Blue. Initially having de facto standing, it was officially adopted in 1955. In 1985, the shade of blue was updated to Oriental Blue, this change would later be rescinded in favor of pre-1985 National Flag Blue. In 1998, the flag gained its present definitive shade of blue currently called Royal Blue.	Defined under Executive Order No. 23, s. 1936 dated March 25, 1936. The shade of blue used here is Cable No. 70077 or "National Flag Blue" by the Reference Guide of the Textile Color Card Association of the United States. The particular shade of blue had de facto standing until January 24, 1955, when President Ramón Magsaysay upon the recommendation of the Philippine Heraldry Committee (PHC) officially adopted Cable No. 70077 or "National Flag Blue" as the official shade of blue to be used.
	1985–1986	Following independence, the 1936 design specifications standardized by President Manuel L. Quezon sported a shade of blue currently called National Flag Blue. Initially having de facto standing, it was officially adopted in 1955. In 1985, the shade of blue was updated to Oriental Blue, this change would later be rescinded in favor of pre-1985 National Flag Blue. In 1998, the flag gained its present definitive shade of blue currently called Royal Blue.	Executive Order No. 1010, s. 1985 was issued by President Ferdinand E. Marcos on February 25, 1985, instructing the National Historical Institute (NHI) "to restore the original color of the First Philippine Flag" amidst debate on the shade used in the original flag. The executive order declared that "the shade of the color blue was lighter than the present dark blue". The executive order did not specify a shade of blue to be adopted. A de facto version of the flag which featured a light blue was used in April 1985 despite NHI not having announced its recommendation. The NHI in May 1985, adopted Cable No. 80176 or "Oriental Blue" for the new national flag.
	1986–1998	Following independence, the 1936 design specifications standardized by President Manuel L. Quezon sported a shade of blue currently called National Flag Blue. Initially having de facto standing, it was officially adopted in 1955. In 1985, the shade of blue was updated to Oriental Blue, this change would later be rescinded in favor of pre-1985 National Flag Blue. In 1998, the flag gained its present definitive shade of blue currently called Royal Blue.	1936 version of the flag restored after the 1986 People Power Revolution. President Corazon C. Aquino restored the pre-1985 National Flag Blue specifications of the flag through Executive Order No. 292, s. 1987 which was signed on July 25, 1987.
	1998–present	Following independence, the 1936 design specifications standardized by President Manuel L. Quezon sported a shade of blue currently called National Flag Blue. Initially having de facto standing, it was officially adopted in 1955. In 1985, the shade of blue was updated to Oriental Blue, this change would later be rescinded in favor of pre-1985 National Flag Blue. In 1998, the flag gained its present definitive shade of blue currently called Royal Blue.	The Flag and Heraldic Code of the Philippines (Republic Act. 8491, s. 1998) specifies the colors for the blue field Cable No. 80173; the white field, Cable No. 80001; the red field, Cable No. 80108; and the golden-yellow Stars and Sun, Cable No. 80068. The colors were introduced in the same year that the Centennial celebrations were to take place.

== Proposals ==
=== Skull and crossbones ===
Mark Twain's satirical proposal

In 1901, Mark Twain wrote a satirical essay titled To the Person Sitting in Darkness, in which he expressed strong anti-imperialist views against certain ongoing conflicts such as the Philippine-American War. At one point, Twain sarcastically described what the flag of an American-controlled Philippines should look like; "And as for a flag for the Philippine Province, it is easily managed. We can have a special one—our States do it: we can have just our usual flag, with the white stripes painted black and the stars replaced by the skull and cross-bones."

=== Ninth ray for the flag's sun ===
Philippine flag with the proposed ninth ray.

Proposals to add a ninth ray to the sun of the Philippine flag dates as early as 1969, when the Ninth Ray historical reform movement started at the University of the Philippines Diliman in Quezon City. The symbolism of the ninth ray varies by proponent.

==== As representative of a ninth province ====
Prior to the 1998 independence centennial celebrations, the provincial government of Zambales lobbied that the sunburst design accommodate a ninth ray, reasoning that their province was also in a state of rebellion in 1896. The Centennial Commission however refuted this change, based on research by the National Historical Institute. In August 2003, then Foreign Affairs Secretary Blas Ople also lobbied for a ninth ray, saying that the province of Quezon should be added. He reasons that the first uprising against the Spaniards happened at the foot of Mount Banahaw which was led by Hermano Pule in 1841.

==== As representative of an ethnic group ====
In December 1987, congressman Alawadin Bandon Jr. of Tawi-Tawi proposed the addition of a ninth ray to the Philippine flag's sun to represent "Muslim participation" in the Philippine Revolution, arguing that "As a Muslim I am assaulted by a feeling of alienation in being excluded from the symbolic narration of the great history of the country." Senator Aquilino Pimentel Jr. later expressed the same view, filing a Senate Bill seeking the addition of a ninth ray representing Filipino Muslims in March 1988.

In 2008, Senator Dick Gordon filed Senate Bill No. 2590 which aimed to amend the Flag and Heraldic Code of the Philippines. This measure was later superseded by Senate Bill No. 3307 which was sponsored by Senator Francis Escudero and approved in September 2009. The bill was sent to the House of Representatives for concurrence with House Bill 6424. Both S.B. No. 3307 and H.B. 6424 was reconciled by the Bicameral Conference Committee in September 2009. President Gloria Macapagal-Arroyo, however, vetoed the measure.

As of 2014, a proposal from the Ninth Ray movement intends the additional ray to represent the Muslim and indigenous people of the country, including the Moro people, who kept colonizers away from their lands.

In June 2018, Gordon renewed his campaign to get his proposal passed into law.

=== Fourth star ===
Osorio's proposal

Emmanuel L. Osorio, one of the founders of the Ninth Ray movement, also came up with a proposal adding not only a ninth ray to the flag's sun but adding a fourth star to the flag, representing North Borneo (present-day Sabah), a territory claimed by the Philippines but currently under Malaysian sovereignty. The flag's triangle is changed into a rectangle to accommodate the fourth star. According to Osorio, the star representing Sabah in his proposed flag was added "in principle" and said the flag proposal seeks to express the Ninth Ray movement's view that "if we get Sabah, then it could be represented by the star".

=== Crescent moon ===
There was a proposal to add a crescent moon during the administration of President Fidel V. Ramos in a lead up to the 1998 Philippine Centennial. Ramos directed Education Secretary Ricardo Gloria in 1995 to form a commission of scholars to research on the possible modification of the flag. The crescent is meant to represent the Moro community.

== Usage ==
=== Display ===
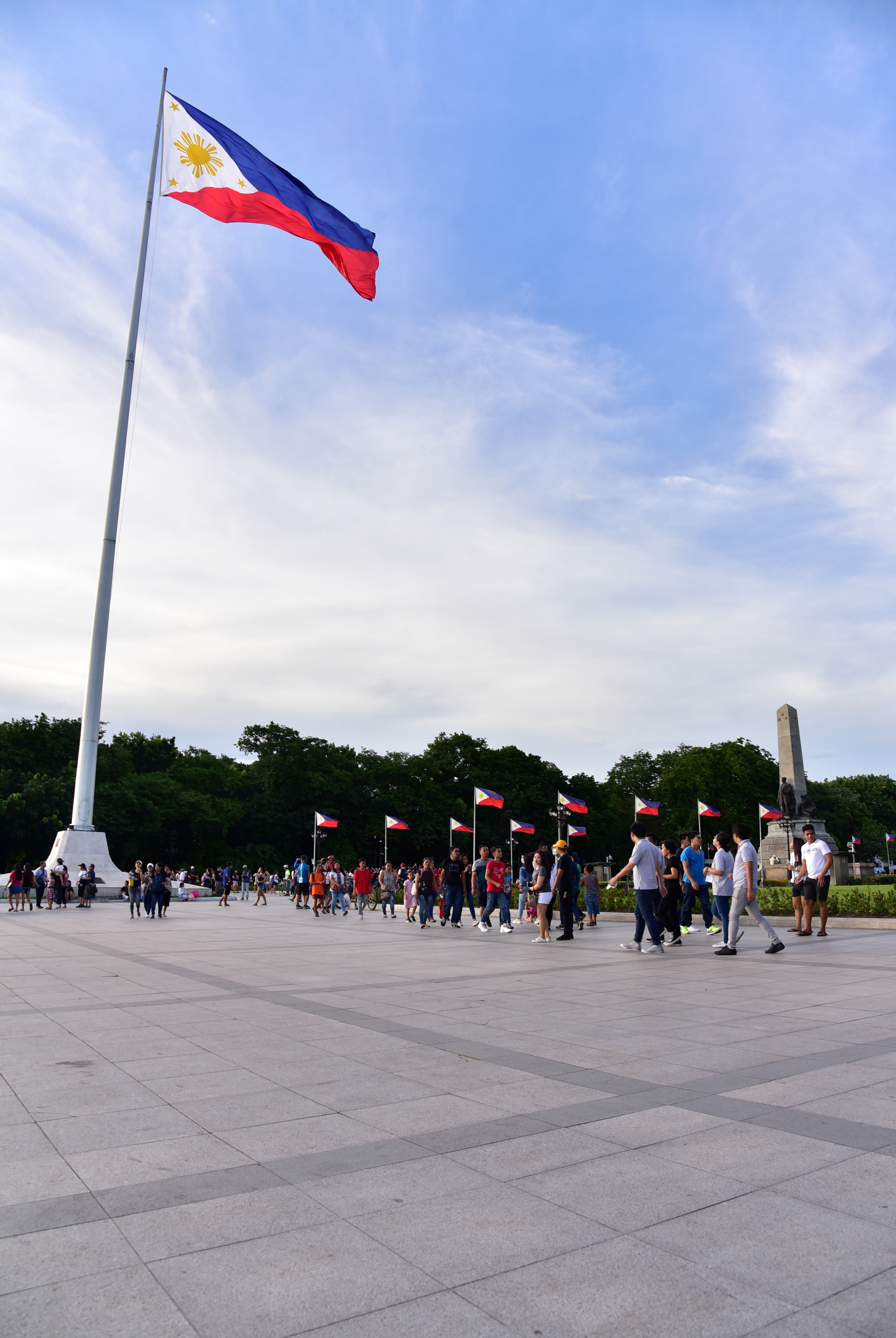
Philippine flag flying in the historic Independence Flagpole

The flag should be displayed in all government buildings, official residences, public plazas, and schools every day throughout the year. All other places as may be designated by the National Historical Commission of the Philippines as such. The days of May 28 (National Flag Day) and June 12 (Independence Day) are designated flag days, when all offices, agencies and instrumentalities of government, business establishments, institutions of learning and private homes are enjoined to display the flag. In recent years, flag days have been extended to all days from May 28 to June 30, inclusive, to promote patriotism and celebrate independence. Display of the Philippine flag by the public on their properties, during sporting matches, etc., is legal and common at other times of the year.

It is illegal to display the Philippine flag in cockpit arenas, casinos, and other gambling establishments; discothèques, night and day clubs; strip clubs, massage parlours, and houses of prostitution; methamphetamine consumption areas, methadone clinics, and "places of vice or where frivolity prevails".

When displaying the Philippine flag with another flag in a crossed position, the former should hang on the left side of the observer and its staff should be displayed over the staff of the second flag. The display of two crossed Philippine flags is not permissible. In the case of the Philippine flag's display on a stage or platform such as in a speech, the flag's staff should be positioned on the right side and in front of the speaker and all other secondary flags displayed on the speaker's left.

==== Permanent display ====
===== Original named sites =====
By law, the Philippine flag must be permanently hoisted and illuminated at night at the following places:

Sites of permanent display of the Philippine flag as per Republic Act No. 8491
Site	Location	Photo	Notes
Malacañang Palace	Manila		Official residence of the President of the Philippines
Congress of the Philippines Building (Batasang Pambansa Complex)	Quezon City		Listed as "Congress of the Philippines building" despite the Congress covering both the Senate and House of Representatives.
Supreme Court Building	Manila		
Rizal Monument	Manila		
Aguinaldo Shrine	Kawit, Cavite		
Barasoain Shrine	Malolos, Bulacan		
Tomb of the Unknown Soldier	Taguig		Specific site at the Libingan ng mga Bayani (Heroes' Cemetery). NHI Board Resolution No. 2 (2004), changed the description of the site's location from Makati to Taguig.
Mausoleo de los Veteranos de la Revolución (Mausoleum of the Veterans of the Revolution)	Manila		
All international ports of entry	Various (List of seaports / airports)		

===== Additional sites =====
The National Historical Commission of the Philippines (formerly the National Historical Institute) as per Republic Act No. 8491 can also designate additional sites where the Philippine flag should be displayed permanently.

Additional sites of permanent display of the Philippine flag as designated by the National Historical Commission of the Philippines
Site	Location	Photo	Basis	Notes
Senate of the Philippines Building (GSIS Building)	Pasay		NHI Board Resolution No. 2 (2004)	
Bonifacio Monument	Caloocan			
Marcela Agoncillo Historical Landmark	Taal, Batangas			
Battle of Alapan	Imus, Cavite		NHCP Board Resolution No. 17 (2015)	Listed after the historical event; the Battle of Alapan
Santa Barbara Plaza	Santa Barbara, Iloilo		NHCP Board Resolution No. 17 (2015)	Site where the first hoisting of the national flag outside of Luzon on November 17, 1898.
Subic Bay Metropolitan Authority	Olongapo		NHCP Board Resolution No. 8 (2017)	Administration building of the Subic Bay Metropolitan Authority at the Subic Bay Free Port Qualifies as an international port of entry.
Old Legislative Building	Manila		NHCP Board Resolution No. 8 (2017)	Site of the inauguration of the Philippine Commonwealth and Manuel L. Quezon as president.
Angeles Heritage District	Angeles City		NHCP Board Resolution No. 8 (2017)	As the site of the first anniversary of the declaration of Philippine independence held in 1899 m particularly the Holy Rosary Parish Church atrium and the Pamintuan Mansion which served as the Presidential Palace at the time.
Liberty Shrine	Lapu-Lapu City		NHCP Board Resolution No. 10 (2020)	Monument to Lapu-Lapu and commemorating the victory of the chieftain's forces in the 1521 Battle of Mactan. Flag of permanent display since January 17, 2021.

==== Half-mast ====
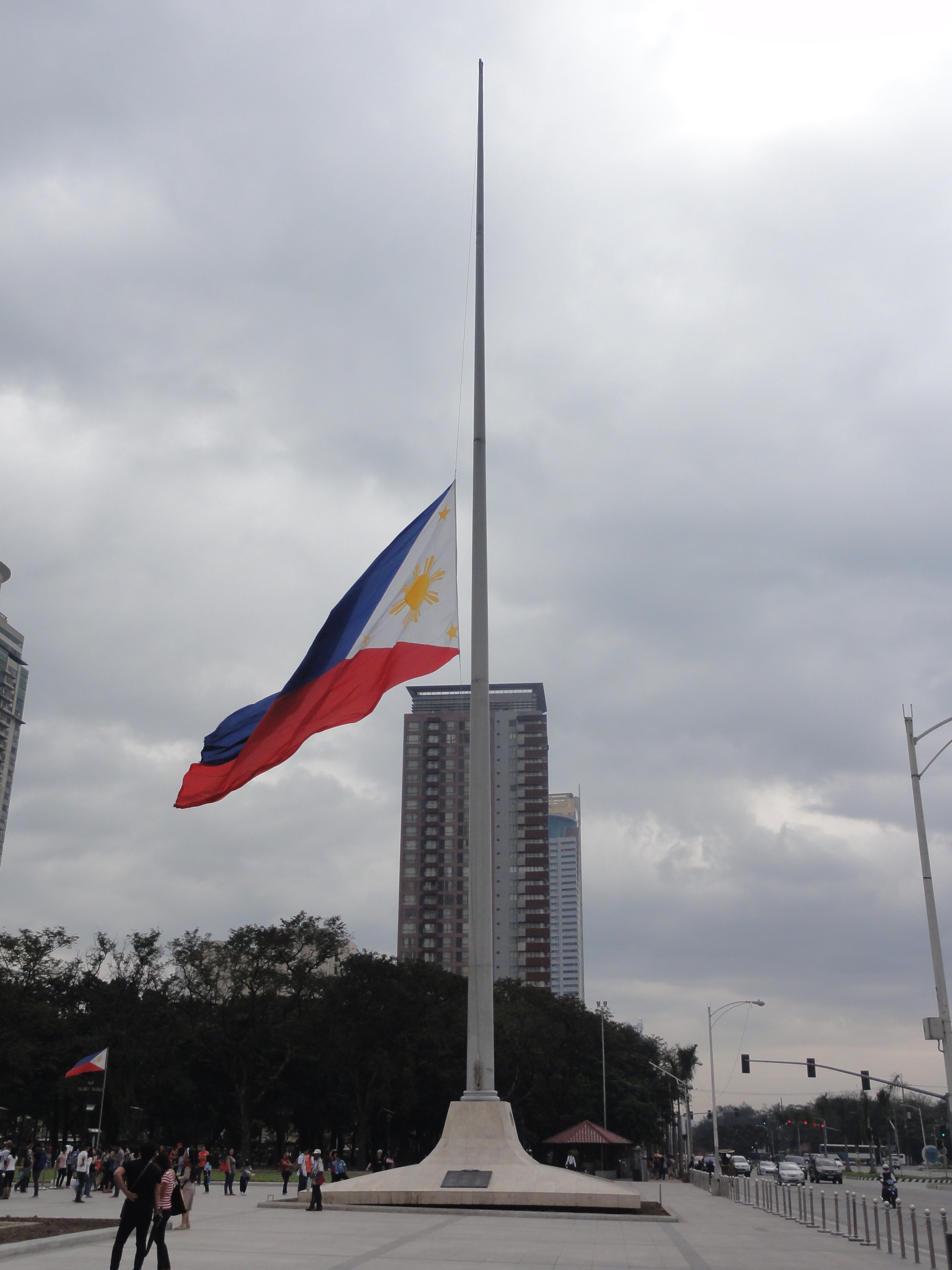
The Philippine flag at Rizal Park, flown at half-mast on January 30, 2015, during the National Day of Mourning in the aftermath of the Mamasapano clash

The flag may be flown at half-mast as a sign of mourning. Upon the official announcement of the death of the president or a former president, the flag should be flown at half-mast for ten days. The flag should be flown at half-mast for seven days following the death of the vice president, the chief justice, the president of the Senate or the speaker of the House of Representatives.

The flag may also be required to fly at half-mast upon the death of other persons to be determined by the National Historical Institute, for a period less than seven days. The flag shall be flown at half-mast on all the buildings and places where the decedent was holding office, on the day of death until the day of interment of an incumbent member of the Supreme Court, the Cabinet, the Senate or the House of Representatives, and such other persons as may be determined by the National Historical Commission.

When flown at half-mast, the flag should be first hoisted to the peak for a moment then lowered to the half-mast position. It should be raised to the peak again before it is lowered for the day.

A bill was filed in 2014 to mandate the flying of the flag at half-mast for a deceased public school teacher. Under the proposal, the flag shall be flown at half-mast for at least five days at the school or district office where the deceased teacher was assigned.

==== In wakes and burials ====
The flag may also be used to as a pall on the coffin of a deceased public official or government employee, as well as outstanding civilians so recognized by the state. In such cases, the flag must be placed such that the white triangle is at the head and the blue portion covers the right side of the casket. The flag is never lowered into the grave nor allowed to touch the ground, but should be solemnly folded and handed to the heirs of the deceased.

It is acceptable to place religious items on top of the Philippine flag if it is the pall of a coffin (e.g. a rosary, Bible, Quran, crucifix, cross, etc.) as part of funeral rites and to reflect the constitutional guarantee of religious freedom.

==== As a war ensign ====
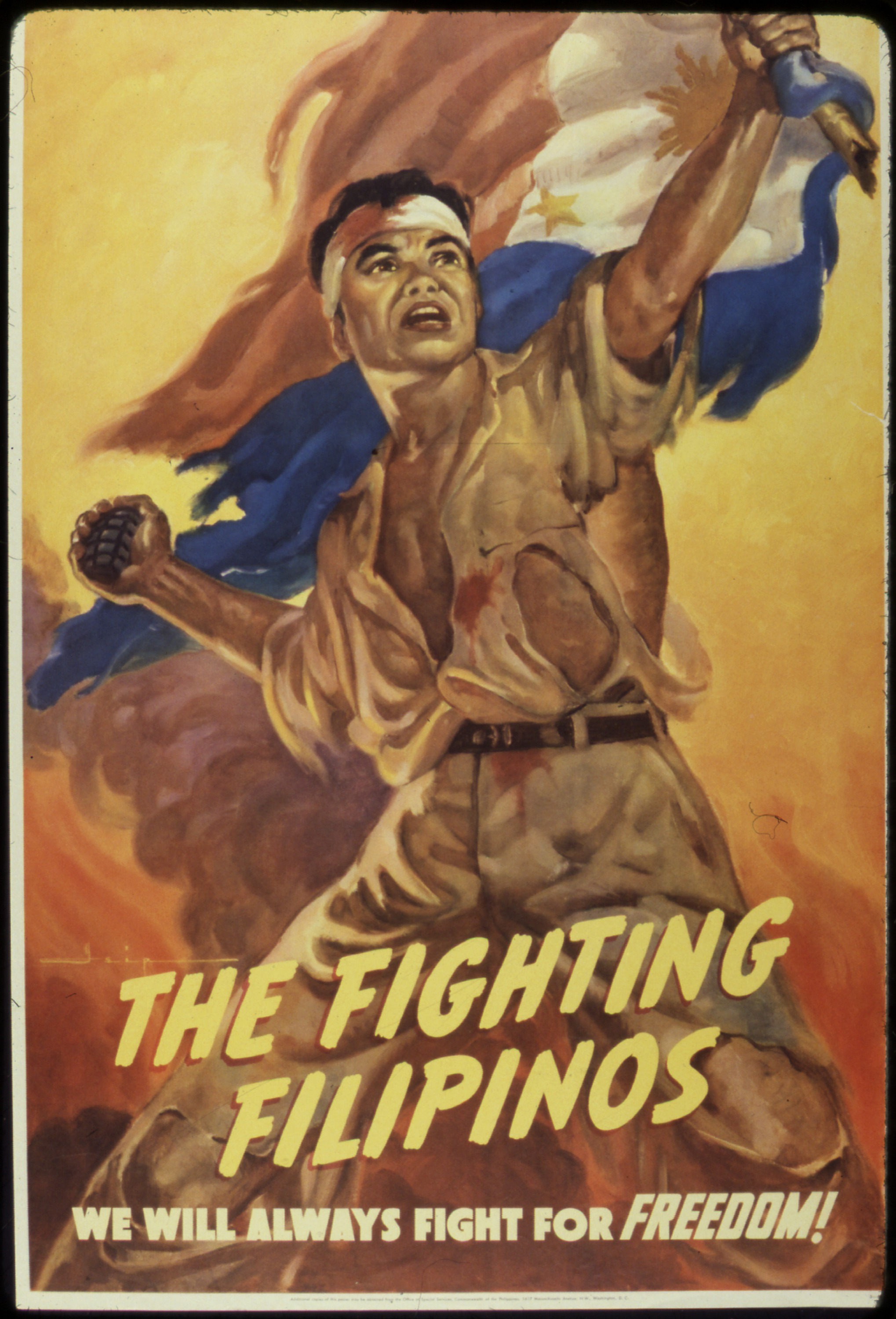
A pro-Allied World War II propaganda poster showing a Philippine soldier holding the national flag with the red field flown upwards

The Philippines does not utilize a separate war flag; instead, the national flag itself is used for this purpose. To indicate a state of war, the red field is flown upwards and is placed on the right (i.e., the observer's left) when hung vertically. In times of peace, however, the blue area is the superior field. On this case, the Philippine flag is the only official country flag in the world that can be flipped when the country is at war. (Note: Section 1, Paragraph 4. The Flag, if flown from a flagpole, should have its blue field on top in time of peace and the red field on top in time of war; if in a hanging position, the blue field should be to the right (left of the observer) in time of peace, and the red field to the right (left of observer) in time of war.) (Note: Section 10. The flag, if flown from a flagpole, shall have its blue field on top in time of peace and the red field on top in time of war; if in a hanging position, the blue field shall be to the right (left of the observer) in time of peace, and the red field to the right (left of the observer) in time of war.) The red side-up orientation of the flag was used by the First Philippine Republic during the Philippine–American War from 1899 to 1901, by the Philippine Commonwealth during World War II from 1941 to 1945, by the Japanese-sponsored Philippine Republic when it declared war against the United Kingdom and the United States in 1944, by soldiers and civilians during the attempted coups d'états against President Corazon Aquino's administration, and by militants and rallyists during EDSA III. Also the war ensign flag was seen during the January 6 United States Capitol attack and Canada convoy protests by participating Filipino Americans and Canadians.

=== Subdivision insignia ===
The usage of the Philippine flag as an element of a local government unit's (LGU; provinces, cities, and municipalities) seal is discouraged as per Memorandum Circular 92-30 of the Department of the Interior and Local Government. The usage of the flag is permissible if the flag itself has been part of the LGU's history such as in the case of Kawit, Cavite, which is the site of the declaration of Philippine independence.

=== In intellectual property ===
The Philippine flag itself is not eligible to be trademarked according to the Intellectual Property Office of the Philippines (IPOPHIL) since the flag is "owned by the public" in line with prohibitions on the flag's usage stated in Republic Act 8491. The Paris Convention for the Protection of Industrial Property, which the Philippines is a member of, also prohibits the registration of the state flags of its members as trademark. However both small and large businesses in the Philippines have used elements of the Philippine flag for their intellectual property. When it comes to this concern, the IPOPHIL has allowed businesses to use elements of the flag to invoke the national symbol as long as the intellectual property is neither a "true representation" of the Philippine flag nor a "modification that would amount to defacement of the flag".

=== Prohibited acts ===
Section 10 of RA 8491 states that when the flag is displayed on a wall during peacetime, the blue field is to the observers' left, as shown here.

According to Republic Act 8491 itself, it shall be prohibited:

a) To mutilate, deface, defile, trample on or cast contempt or commit any act or omission casting dishonor or ridicule upon the flag or over its surface;
b) To dip the flag to any person or object by way of compliment or salute;
c) To use the flag:

1) As a drapery, festoon, tablecloth;
2) As covering for ceilings, walls, statues or other objects;
3) As a pennant in the hood, side, back and top of motor vehicles;
4) As a staff or whip;
5) For unveiling monuments or statues; and
6) As trademarks, or for industrial, commercial or agricultural labels or designs.

d) To display the flag:

1) Under any painting or picture;
2) Horizontally face-up. It shall always be hoisted aloft and be allowed to fall freely;
3) Below any platform; or
4) In discothèques, cockpits, night and day clubs, casinos, gambling joints and places of vice or where frivolity prevails.

e) To wear the flag in whole or in part as a costume or uniform;
f) To add any word, figure, mark, picture, design, drawings, advertisement, or imprint of any nature on the flag;
g) To print, paint or attach representation of the flag on handkerchiefs, napkins, cushions, and other articles of merchandise;
h) To display in public any foreign flag, except in embassies and other diplomatic establishments, and in offices of international organizations;
i) To use, display or be part of any advertisement or infomercial; and
j) To display the flag in front of buildings or offices occupied by aliens.

The Act mandates that violators shall, upon conviction, be punished by fine or imprisonment.

However, some usage is tolerated such as the use of Philippine flag as patches in athlete's uniforms. Another case is of public officials and employees such as politicians often wearing pins with the flag as the motif.

== Relevant customs ==
=== Pledge ===
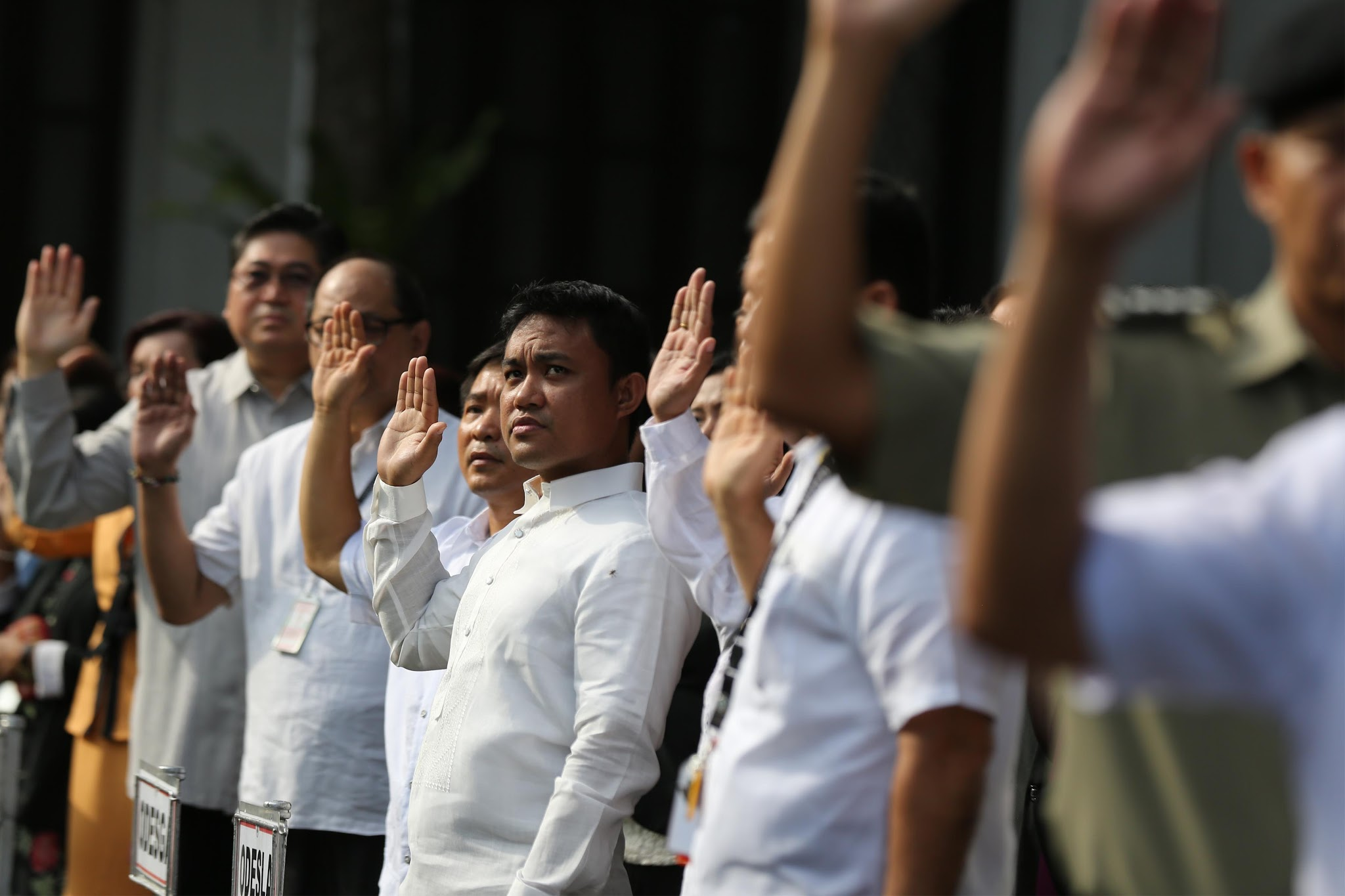
Government employees and officials raising their right hand for the pledge of allegiance to the Philippine flag

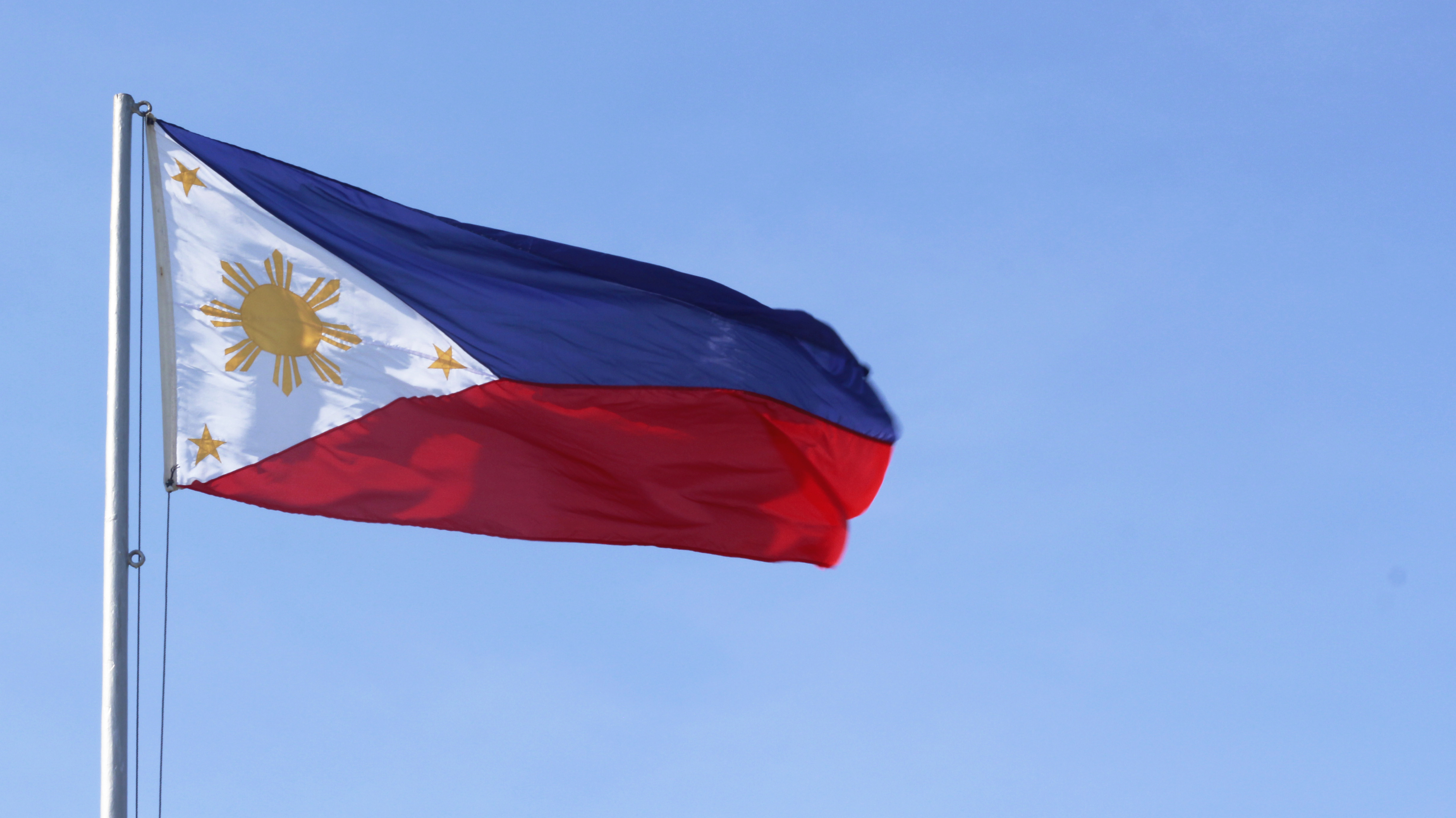
Philippine flag waving on a flagpole

The Pledge of Allegiance to the Philippine flag (distinct from the Patriotic Oath of Allegiance) should be recited while standing with the right hand with palm open raised shoulder high. Individuals whose faith or religious beliefs prohibit them from making such pledge as well as singing the national anthem are permitted to excuse themselves, but are required by law to show full respect when the pledge is being rendered by standing at attention.

The law makes no statement regarding the language in which the pledge must be recited, but the pledge is written (and therefore recited) in the Filipino language.

=== Flag anthem ===
Spanish, Tagalog and English versions of the national anthem have been given official status throughout Philippine history. However, only the most recent and current "Filipino" version is officially recognized by law. The Flag and Heraldic Code, approved on February 12, 1998, specifies, Lupang Hinirang, "The National Anthem shall always be sung in the national language within or without the country"; violation of the law is punishable by a fine and imprisonment.

=== National Flag Day ===
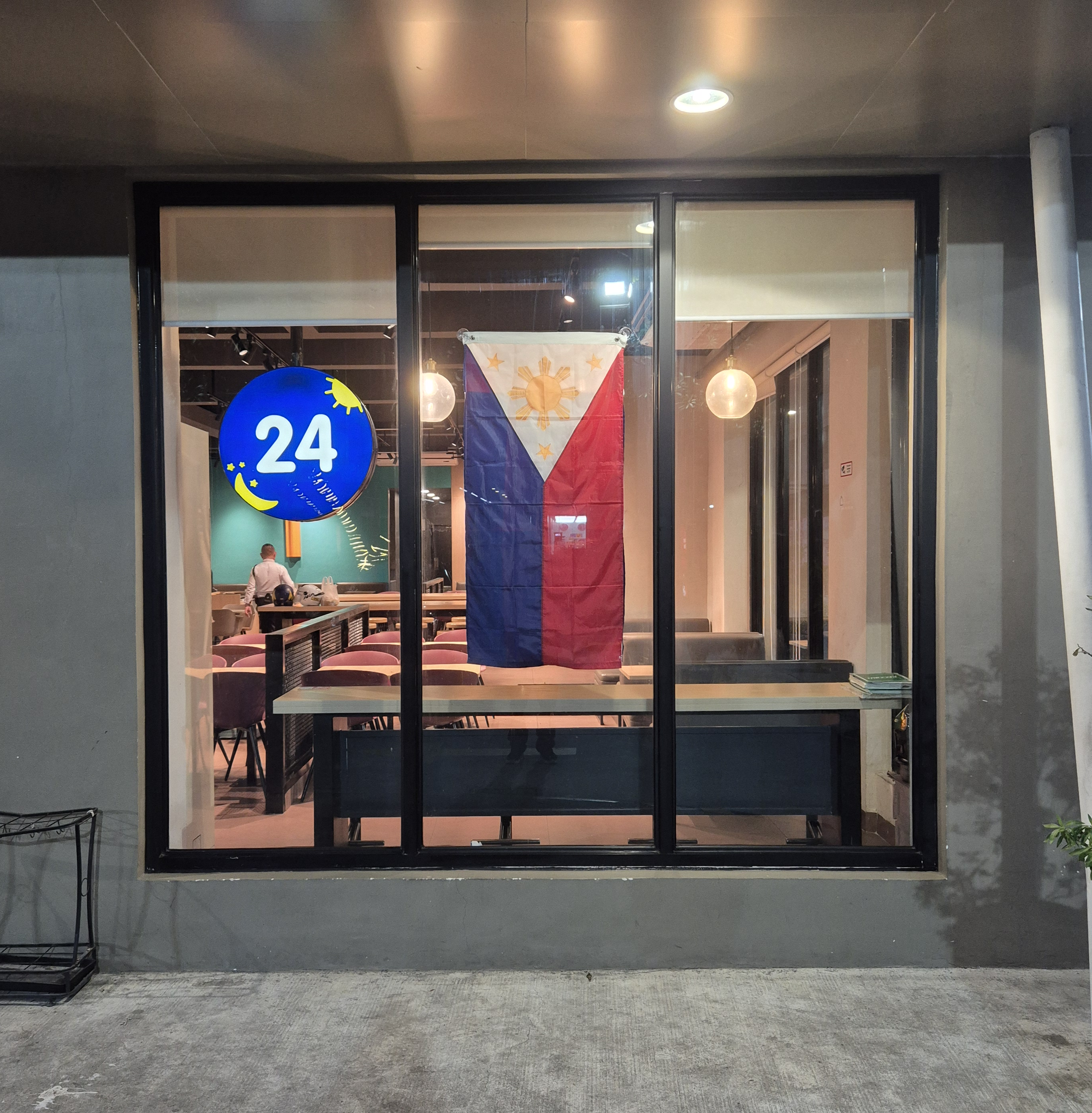
Philippine flag hanging vertically on the window of a Jollibee store during the National Flag Days in 2026

The National Flag Day in the Philippines is celebrated every May 28, the very day of the 1898 Battle of Alapan. The official national flag flying period starts from May 28 and ends on Independence Day, June 12, every year, although the flying period for the flag in homes, businesses and public establishments may start on a specified day of May (to be given by the National Historical Commission of the Philippines) and may last until June 30.

== See also ==
- Coat of arms of the Philippines
- List of Philippine flags
- Flags of the provinces of the Philippines
- Flags of cities and municipalities in the Philippines
- Philippine coastwise emblem
