= Short-sea shipping =

Movement of cargo and passengers by sea along a coast, without crossing an ocean

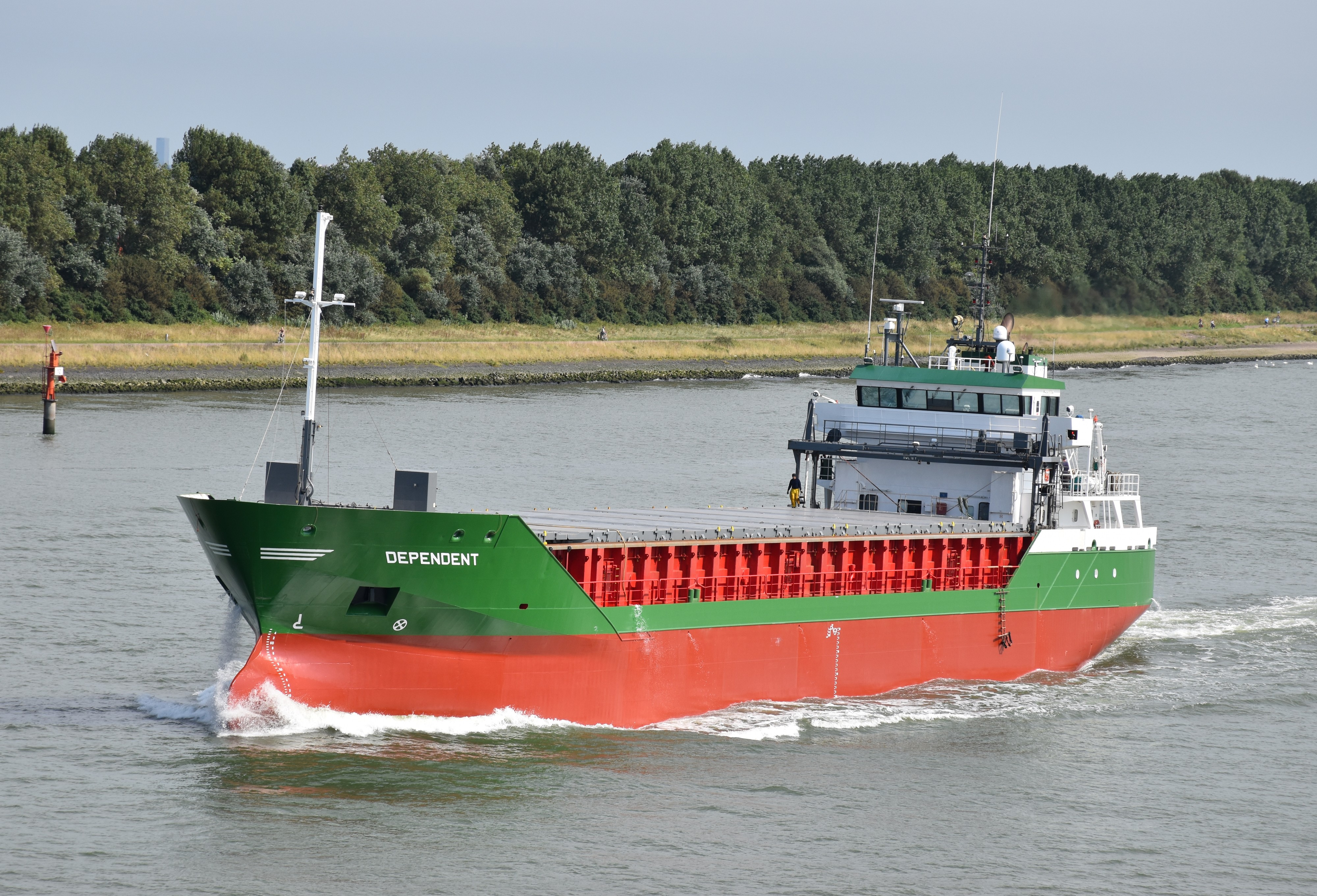
A modern short-sea trader with masts up while in coastal waters, near Rotterdam, Netherlands

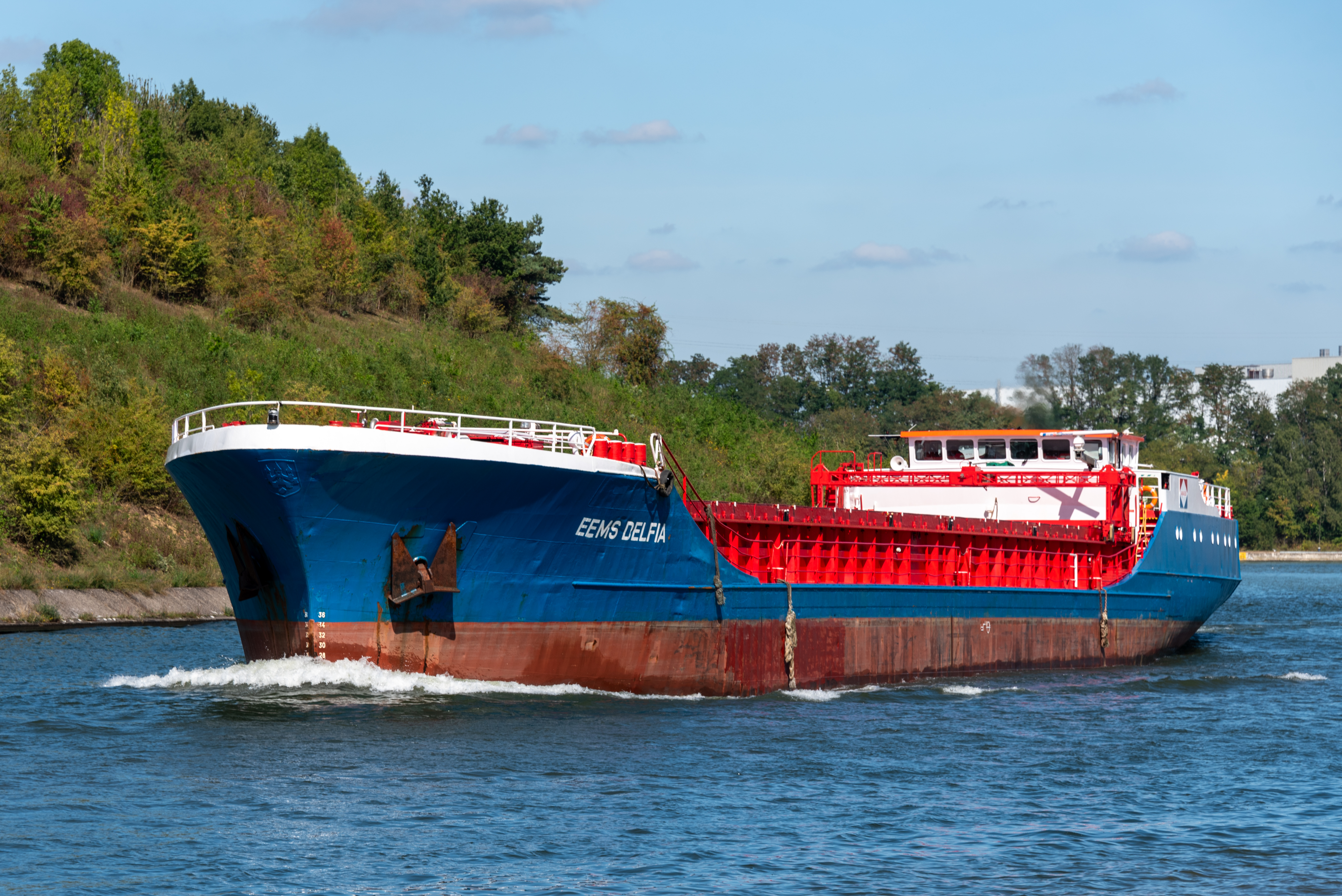
Short-sea trader with masts folded down, in the Albert Canal, Belgium

The modern terms short-sea shipping (sometimes unhyphenated), marine highway and motorways of the sea, as well as the more historical terms coastal trade, coastal shipping, coasting trade and coastwise trade, all encompass the movement of cargo and passengers mainly by sea along a coast, without crossing an ocean.

Short-sea shipping (or a translation thereof) is the term used by the European Commission and commonly throughout the European Union. Many English-speaking countries have used the British terms coasting trade and coastwise trade.

The United States maintained these term from its colonial era, including for domestic slave trade that shipped slaves by water from the Upper South to major markets, especially New Orleans. The US began regulating general coasting trade as early as 1793, with "An act for enrolling and licensing ships and vessels to be employed in the coasting trade and fisheries, and for regulating the same", which passed Congress on February 18 of that year. Over the years, it has been codified as Title 46 of the United States Code, Chapter 551 (46 USC Ch. 551), "Coastwise Trade".

Some short-sea ship vessels are small enough to travel inland on inland waterways. Short-sea shipping includes the movements of wet and dry bulk cargoes, containers and passengers around the coast (say from Lisbon to Rotterdam or from New Orleans to Philadelphia). Typical ship sizes range from 1,000 DWT (tonnes deadweight – i.e., the amount of cargo they carry) to 15,000 DWT with drafts ranging from around 3 to 6 m (10 to 20 ft). Typical (and mostly bulk) cargoes include grain, fertilisers, steel, coal, salt, stone, scrap, minerals, and oil products (such as diesel oil, kerosene, and aviation fuel), containers, and passengers.

In Europe, short-sea shipping is at the forefront of the European Union's transportation policy. It currently accounts for roughly 40% of all freight moved in Europe. In the US, short-sea shipping has yet to be used to the extent it is in Europe, but there is some development. The main advantages promoted for this type of shipping are alleviation of congestion, decrease of air pollution, and overall cost savings to the shipper and a government. Shipping goods by ship (one 4,000 DWT vessel is equivalent to between 100 and 200 trucks) is far more efficient and cost-effective than road transport (though the goods, if bound inland, have to be transferred and delivered by truck) and is much less prone to theft and damage.

Roughly 40% of all freight moved in Europe is classified as short-sea shipping, but the greater percentage of this cargo moves through Europe's heartland on rivers and not oceans. In the past decade, the term short-sea shipping has evolved in a broader sense to include point-to-point cargo movements on inland waterways as well as inland to ocean ports for shipment over oceans.

The contrasting terms deep-sea shipping, intercontinental shipping and ocean shipping refer to maritime traffic that crosses oceans. Short-sea shipping is also distinct from inland navigation, notably between two cities along a river.

== Europe ==
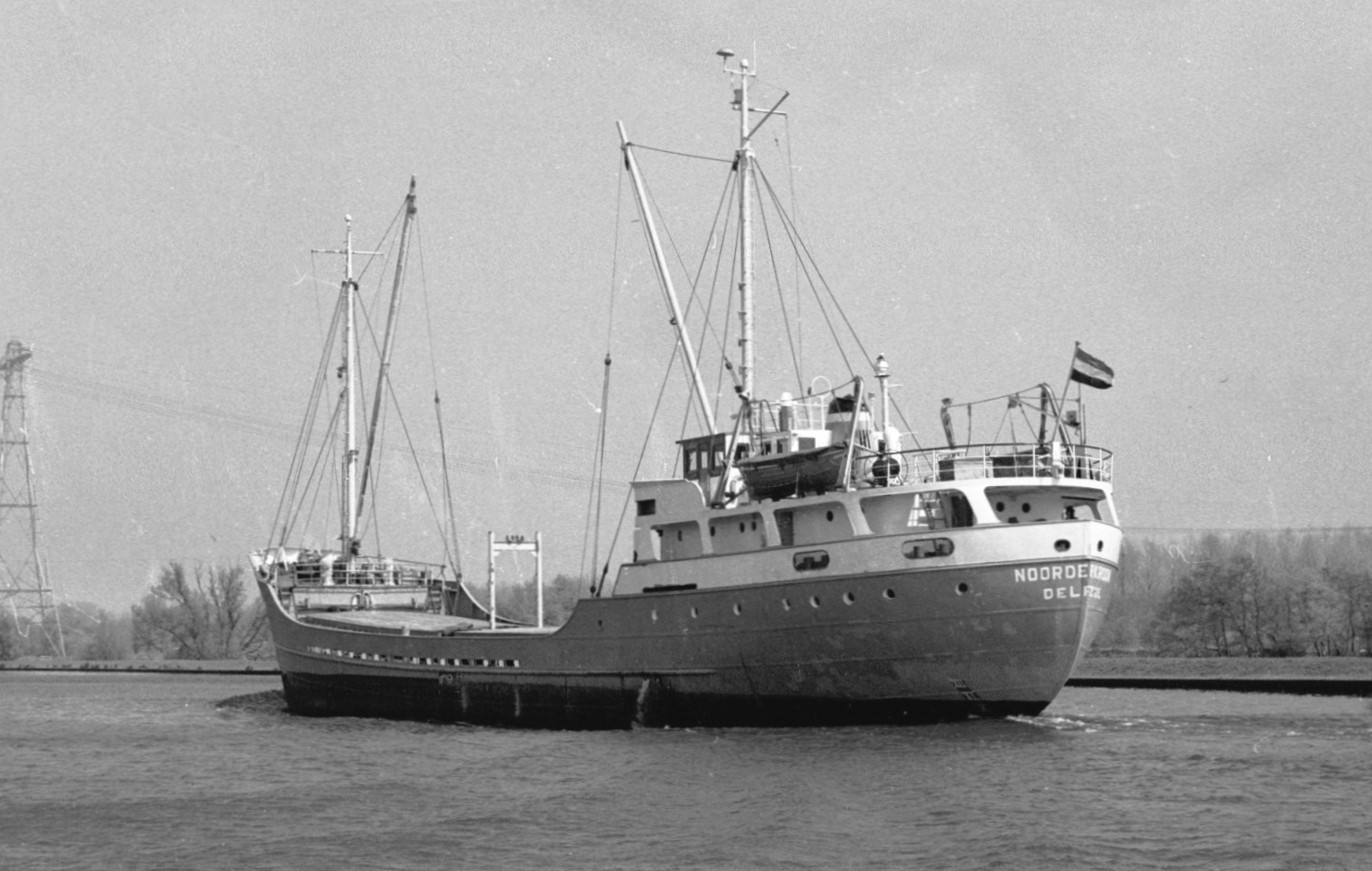
A typical Dutch coaster from the 1950s

In Europe, the main hub of short-sea shipping is Rotterdam, which is the largest European port, with Antwerp as a second. The Netherlands plays an important role in this, having developed a hybrid vessel designed to navigate the sea as well as the Rhine into the Ruhrgebiet. The Dutch and Belgian main waterways (Maas, Waal, Amsterdam-Rhine Canal, Scheldt) locks and bridges are built accordingly. Because of congestion in the larger ports, a number of smaller (container)ports have been developed, and the same goes for the Rhine-ports such as Duisburg and Dortmund in Germany. The ports of Hamburg, Felixstowe (now the largest port in the UK), and Le Havre also are significant in this shipping.

In the Netherlands the sector has seen rapid growth, aided by a tax-enabled investment scheme. The traditional region for building "coasters" is the province of Groningen, where most wharfs have side-laying ship slides. The major trend is to have bare hulls made with cheaper labor in Poland or Romania and to finish them in the Netherlands.

The European Commission presented a 35-point action plan in June 2021 to increase the amount of goods moved through Europe's rivers and canals and to speed up the switch to zero-emission barges by 2050. This is in accordance with the Sustainable and Smart Mobility Strategy and the European Green Deal, which set the target of boosting inland canal and short-sea shipping by 25% by 2030 and by 50% by 2050.

== Philippines ==
In Philippine law, short-sea shipping or coastwise trade is defined as the transport of either merchandise or passengers between two seaports in the Philippines Only vessels with coastwise license secured from and issued by the Maritime Industry Authority can legally engage in coastwise trade in the Philippines. Only vessels with certificate of Philippine registry are eligible for the license. The Philippine coastwise emblem must be hoisted at the main mast of engaged vessels when leaving or entering Philippine seaports.

== US and Canada ==
Cargo movements on the Great Lakes Waterway and Saint Lawrence Seaway system can be classified as short-sea shipping under this broadening of terminology. The St. Lawrence Seaway Management Corporation of Canada and its US counterpart, the St. Lawrence Seaway Development Corporation, have for the past several years promoted this concept under its marketing umbrella "Hwy H_{2}O". The concept is intended to use existing capacity on the 3,700-kilometer (2,300 mi) St. Lawrence – Great Lakes corridor in harmony with rail and truck modes to reduce overland congestion.

Great Lakes Feeder Lines of Burlington, Ontario, Canada was the first company to operate a "fit for purpose", European-built short-sea shipping vessel, named Dutch Runner, on the St. Lawrence Seaway under Canadian flag. During the winter of 2008–2009, it operated a weekly, fixed service between Halifax and St. Pierre et Miquelon, carrying roll-on/roll-off, break bulk, containers, and refrigerated goods. Crew on the ship can load and unload it with the two 35-tonne cranes.

Another Canadian firm, Hamilton-based McKeil Marine, operates a fleet of tug-and-barge combinations; these have has been moving commodities such as tar, fuels, aluminum ingots, and break bulk cargoes for years on the Saint Lawrence Seaway. Along the St. Lawrence River, McKeil Marine transports aluminum ingots from a smelter in Quebec to destinations in Ohio, a distance of 944 nautical miles (1,748 km). One barge carries the equivalent of 220 40-ton trucks.

America's Marine Highway is a program to promote inland and coastal shipping. In 2001 the Port of New York and New Jersey began its Port Inland Distribution Network (PIDN), a project to increase a network of inland points for shipping. Other features include strengthening rail-port connections. It is providing barge service to the Port of Salem in southern New Jersey on the Delaware River. In 2003 it started barge service to the Port of Albany–Rensselaer on the Hudson River in upstate New York, but this was suspended in 2006 after the end of funding for the start-up.

== See also ==
- Cabotage – Transport within a country by an operator from another country
- Coastal trading vessel – Shallow-hulled ships used for trading with ports along the same shoreline
- Feeder ship – Medium-size freight ship
