= Flag Act (Philippines) =

Act of the Philippine Commission

Act 1696, or the Flag Law Act , (Philippine Commission Act № 1696, August 23, 1907) is an act of the Philippine Commission that outlawed the display of the Philippine flag or any flag against American rule, and Katipunan flags, banners, emblems, or devices in the American-controlled Philippine Islands.

On August 23, 1907, American community members held a meeting at the Manila Grand Opera House and passed a resolution urging the proscription of the Filipino flag. On September 6, 1907, the Philippine Commission passed Act No. 1696, commonly known as the Flag Act or Flag Law of 1907. Both the current national anthem, Lupang Hinirang, and the present-day Flag of the Philippines, would have been covered by this ban.

The Flag Act was repealed by the Philippine Legislature in October 1919.
