= Evolution of the Philippine Flag =

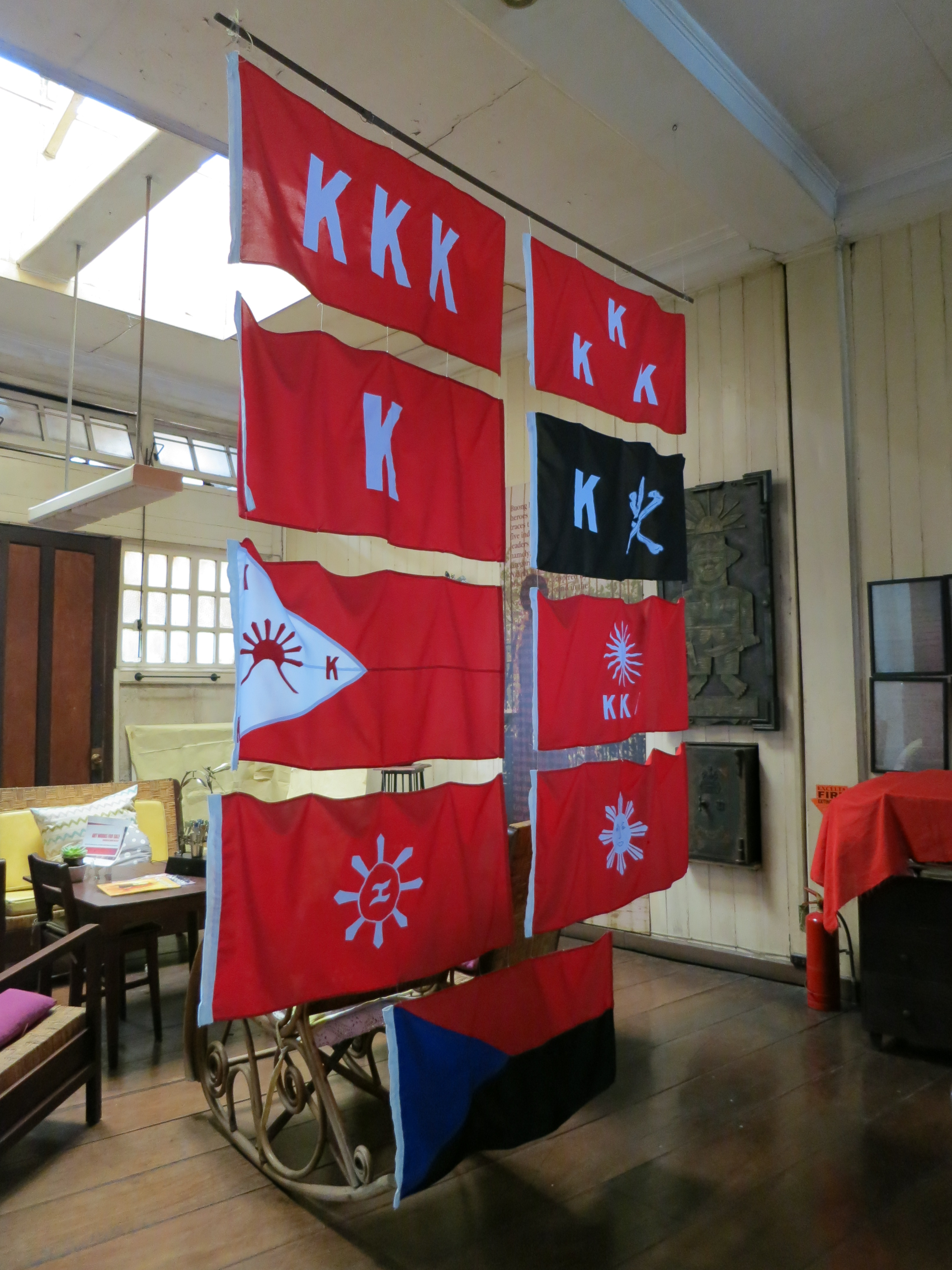
Katipunan flags which are often included in the "Evolution of the Philippine Flag" set at the Bahay Nakpil-Bautista.

The Evolution of the Philippine Flag (Filipino: Ebolusyon ng Bandilang Pilipino) is a set of flags consisting of select banners of the Katipunan of the Philippine Revolution. Often displayed with the flag of the First Republic, it is sometimes erroneously interpreted to imply the chronology of the national flag of the Philippines.

== Background ==
The "Evolution of the Philippine Flag" is a set of various flags of the Katipunan revolutionary group of the Philippine Revolution. Three of the flags are organizational flags of the Katipunan, while others were personal flags or battle standards of Andres Bonifacio, Mariano Llanera, Pio del Pilar, and Gregorio del Pilar. The name of the set erroneously suggest that the modern Flag of the Philippines was derived or "evolved" from the flags used by the Katipunan and all of the flags themselves were national flags.

The Manila Historical Institute and the National Historical Institute had insisted that the flags in the set, excluding the modern Philippine flag, are "Flags of the Philippine Revolution". Historians also questioned the limited number of flags included in the set. It is pointed out that the "Evolution of the Philippine Flag" set only represents a small fraction of flags used by Katipunan battalions.

== Flags ==
| Flag | Description |
|---|---|
| | The "first Katipunan flag". |
| | Variant of the Katipunan flag. |
| | Purported flag of the Magdiwang faction. This flag is also sometimes attributed to the Magdalo faction. |
| | Purported flag of the Magdalo faction. |
| | Purported flag of Republic of Biak-na-Bato. Sometimes described as the "first official revision". |
| | War standard by Andres Bonifacio |
| | Personal flag of Mariano Llanera |
| | Personal flag of Pio del Pilar |
| | Personal flag of Gregorio del Pilar |
| | Flag of the First Philippine Republic with an anthropomorphic sun. The flag itself is not part of the "Evolution of the Philippine Flag" but is often displayed alongside the other flags. Sometimes the more contemporary national flag without the anthropomorphic sun is used. |

== Discrepancies ==
Flag of the first Tagalog Republic according to Chua. This flag is not part of the "Evolution of the Philippine Flag" set.

The flag with the singular "K" is not part of the Boy Scouts of the Philippines' version of the Evolution of Philippine Flag.

According to historian Xiao Chua, there is no evidence supporting the historical usage of three of the flags in the set namely the purported flags of the Magdiwang and Magdalo factions, as well as the red flag with a white anthropomorphic sun. Chua noted discrepancies such as the supposed Magdiwang flag sometimes attributed as the Magdalo flag. Chua states that a separate flag, not part of the set, was used for the first Tagalog Republic formed by the Katipunan, regardless of faction.

== Usage ==
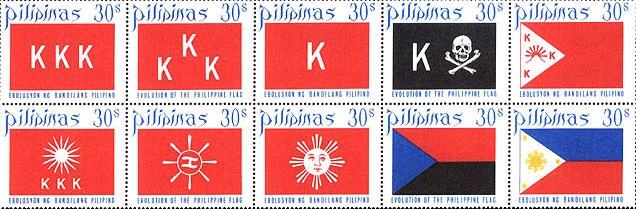
Stamps featuring the "Evolution of the Philippine Flag". (1972)

The flags has been presented as the "Evolution of the Philippine Flag" as early as 1972 as part of a postal stamp series. The set were featured also featured during the Philippine Centennial celebration of 1998.

== See also ==
- Flags of the Philippine Revolution
