= Independence Flagpole =

Flagpole in Manila, Philippines

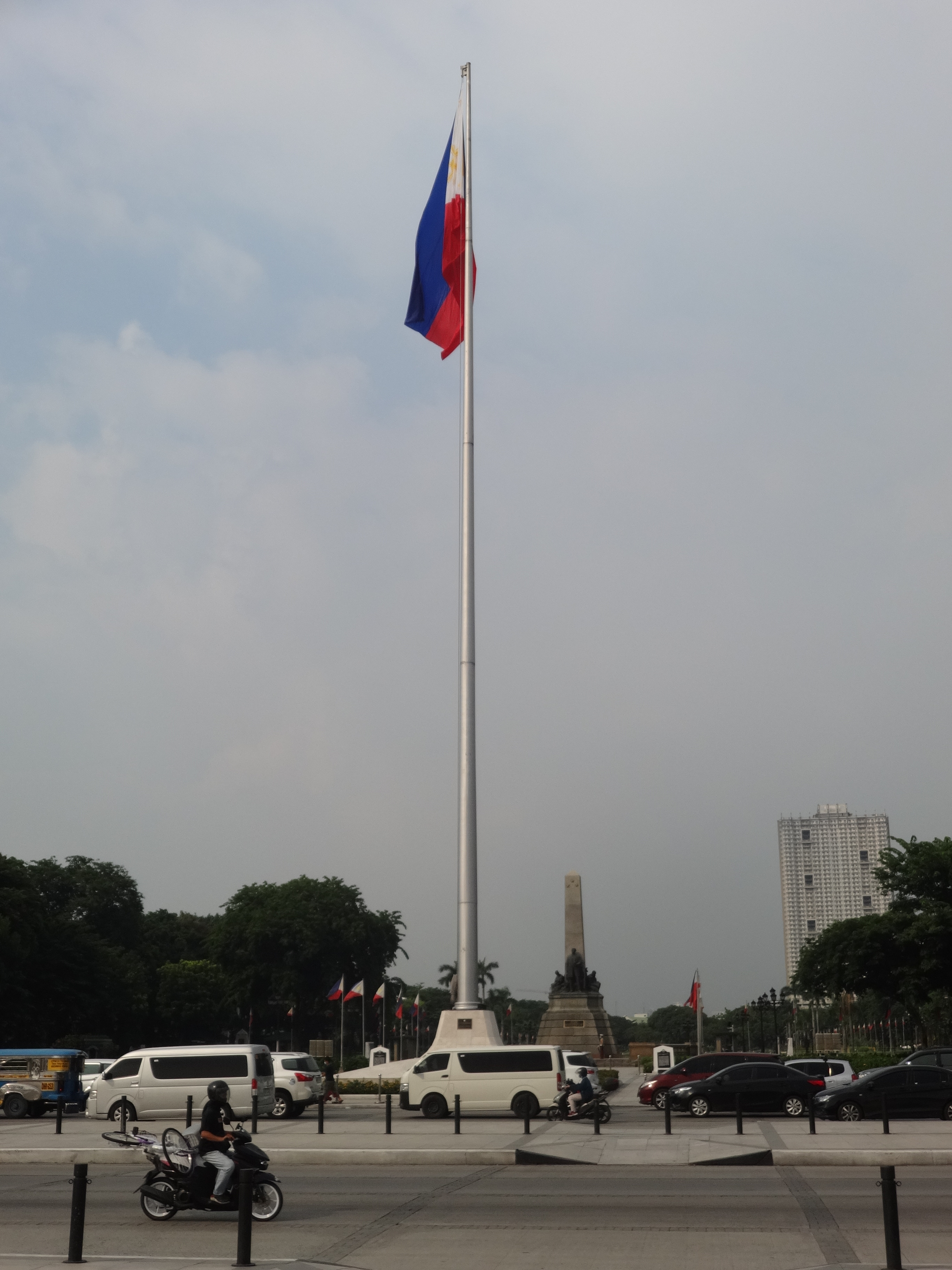
- The flagpole in 2020
- Interactive map of the Independence Flagpole area

General information
- Location: Rizal Park, Manila, Philippines
- Coordinates: 14°34′54″N 120°58′36″E
- Renovated: September 2013
- Renovation cost: ₱7.8 million

Height
- Height: 45.72 m (150.0 ft)

Technical details
- Material: Q345 steel

Renovating team
- Engineer: Manila South Engineering District
- Main contractor: AKH Construction

The Independence Flagpole or the Philippine National Flagpole is a 45.72 m (150.0 ft) flagpole located near the Rizal Monument in Rizal Park in Manila, Philippines. It is the tallest flagpole in the country.

== History ==
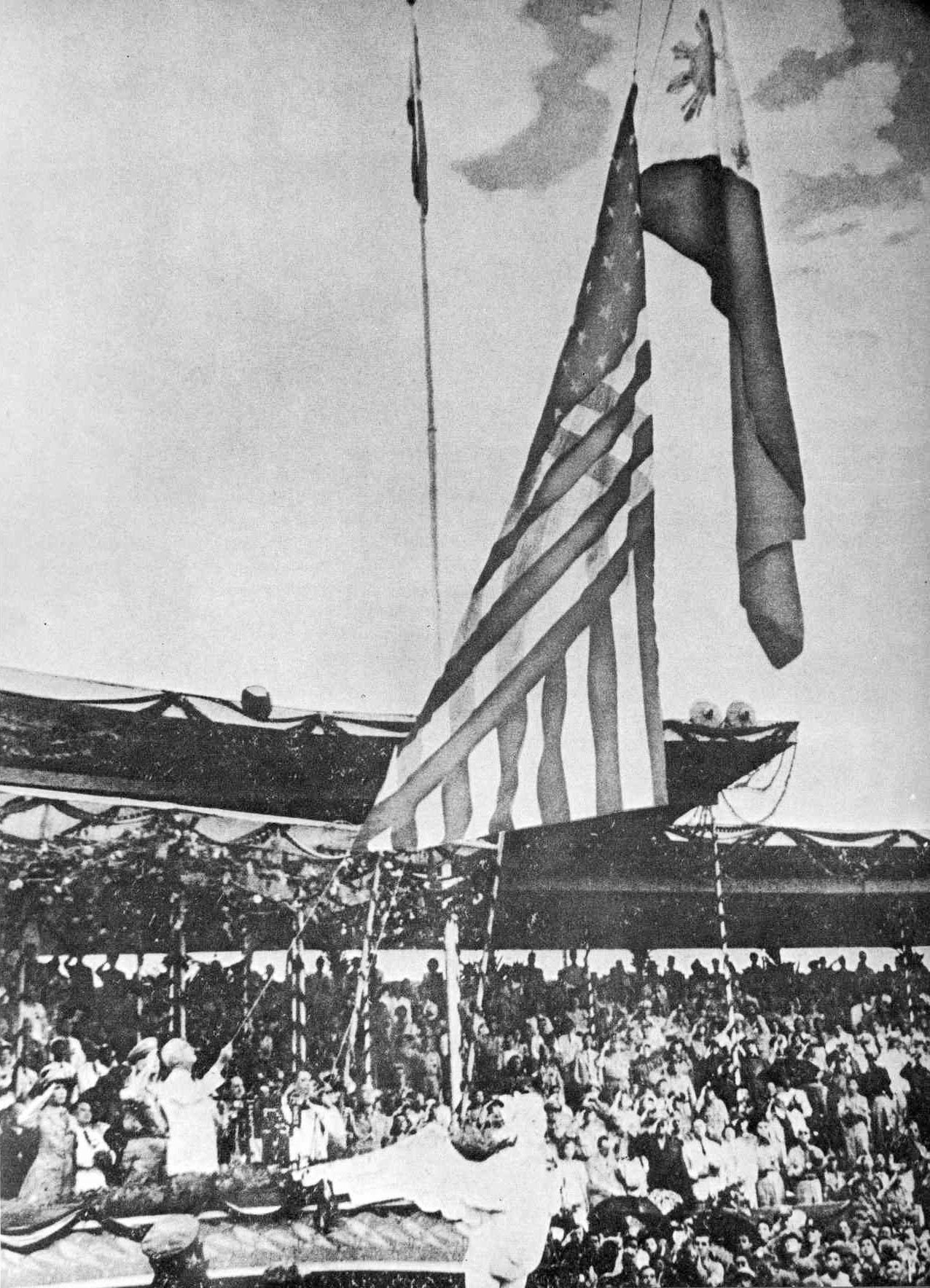
The Flag of the United States of America is lowered while the Flag of the Philippines is raised during the Independence Day ceremonies on July 4, 1946

The Independence Flagpole was the location where the Philippine flag was hoisted on July 4, 1946, when full independence was achieved from the United States. The flagpole was designed to be at 45.72 m (150.0 ft) high but was damaged by Typhoon Angela (Rosing) in 1995 reducing the flagpole's height to just 32 m (105 ft).

=== Restoration ===
Plans to restore the flagpole's original height was proposed in 2011 by the National Parks Development Committee (NPDC) of the Department of Tourism. The renovation project is one of the government body's commemorative projects for the 150th anniversary of Jose Rizal's birth. The NPDC requested funds and assistance from the Department of Public Works and Highways (DPWH) for the project which later underwent a public bidding that amounted to ₱7,865,425.30.

The flagpole's structural integrity was reinforced and a mechanized pulley in lieu of the manual pulley was installed along with a marble base. The renovation project was implemented by the DPWH's Manila South Engineering District while the project contractor was AKH Construction. The material used for the three-segment flagpole is Q345 steel, which along with the installing cranes was shipped from Hong Kong. The flagpole's construction took less than a month and was finished in September 2013. The old flagpole was brought to the Aguinaldo Shrine in Kawit, Cavite, and later installed at the Shrine of the National Flag of the Philippines inside Imus Heritage Park.

The project details of the restoration project went viral and were subject to controversy as critics questioned the price and structural integrity. The DPWH defended the project by emphasizing the flagpole's historical value and assuring the public a structural analysis has been conducted. They also emphasized that the renovation project planned as early as since 2011 went through a bidding process, and justified the cost citing the improvements then to be made for the flagpole.

In February 2016, another renovation work was commenced. The marble base was demolished and newer lights installed at the flagpole's base. The contractor was G.F. Fabian Construction and the cost of the project was ₱1.3 million.

Since October 2019, there has been a national flag raising ceremony on every first Monday of the month, open to the public, echoing similar ceremonies in Beijing's Tiananmen Square and Santiago's Plaza de la Ciudadania.

== Markers ==
The base of the Independence Flagpole contains the following markers:

Indicating the First Cabinet of the President and the First Supreme Court of the Philippines

Indicating the members of the First Congress of the Philippines

Indicating the members of the Joint Executive Committee for the Inauguration of the Republic of the Philippines

Indicating the requirement that the flag of the Philippines be flown permanently at the site, pursuant to the Flag and Heraldic Code of the Philippines (Republic Act No. 8491)
