= Imus Heritage Park =

Memorial park in Cavite, Philippines

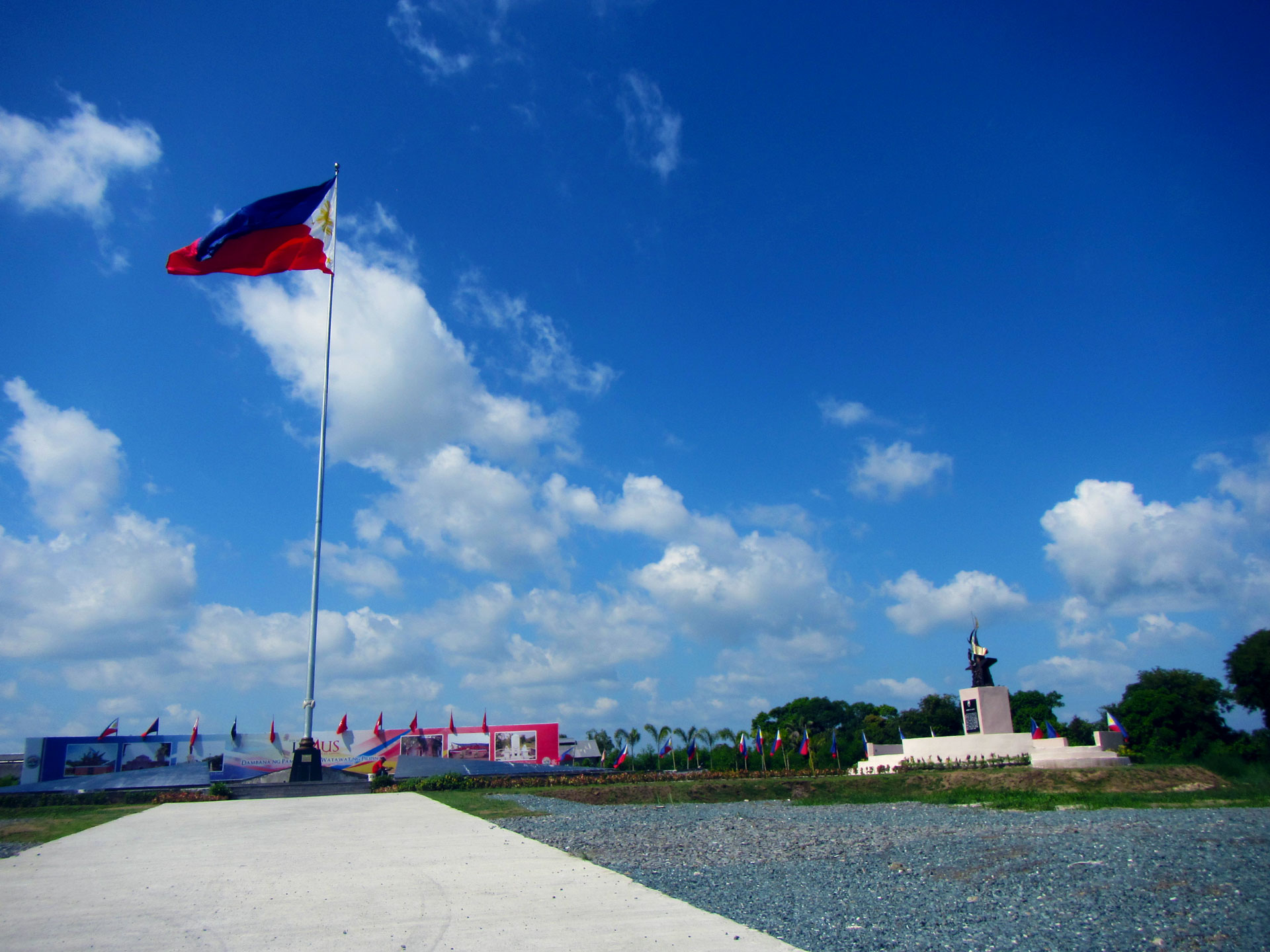
- The park in 2014
- Interactive map of Imus Heritage Park
- Type: Memorial park
- Location: Imus, Cavite, Philippines
- Coordinates: 14°24′14.5″N 120°54′55.1″E
- Designation: National Historic Landmark (1993)

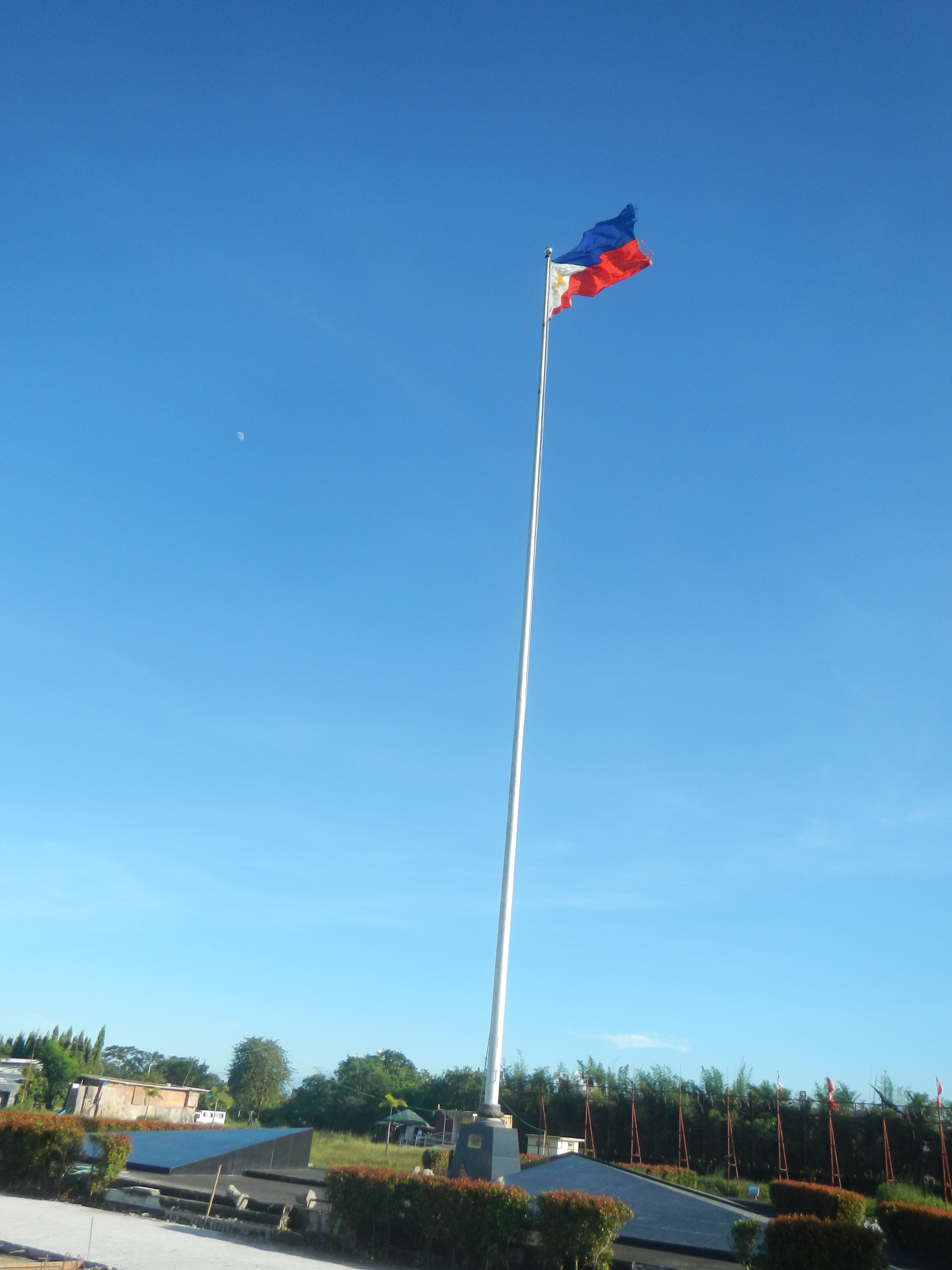
The flagpole in 2018

The Imus Heritage Park is a memorial park in Imus, Cavite, Philippines commemorating the Battle of Alapan. It is known for the Shrine of the National Flag of the Philippines (Filipino: Dambana ng Pambansang Watawat ng Pilipinas).

The National Historical Commission of the Philippines recognizes the Imus Heritage Park as a National Historic Landmark through Resolution No. 5 of May 26, 1993. The park has also been a venue for National Flag Day commemorations.

The park covers an area of 5 hectares (12 acres), purportedly at the site where the Battle of Alapan occurred. It also features a 35.05 m (115.0 ft) flagpole, which used to be the old Independence Flagpole in Rizal Park in Manila. In 2019, a sanctum of Katipunan revolutionary flags was unveiled at the National Flag Shrine.

A 10 m (33 ft) sculpture, Inang Laya (lit. 'Mother of Freedom'), created by visual artist Sandro Pakingan Castrillo, was introduced in 2020 and formally inaugurated on May 28, 2023. The statue is located at the center of the amphitheater in that area.
