= Philippine coastwise emblem =

Flag for Filipino vessels trading along shores

- Use: Civil ensign (Domestic only)
- Adopted: 1903
- Design: Rectangular white flag with one blue and one red stars ranged from staff to tip in the horizontal median line

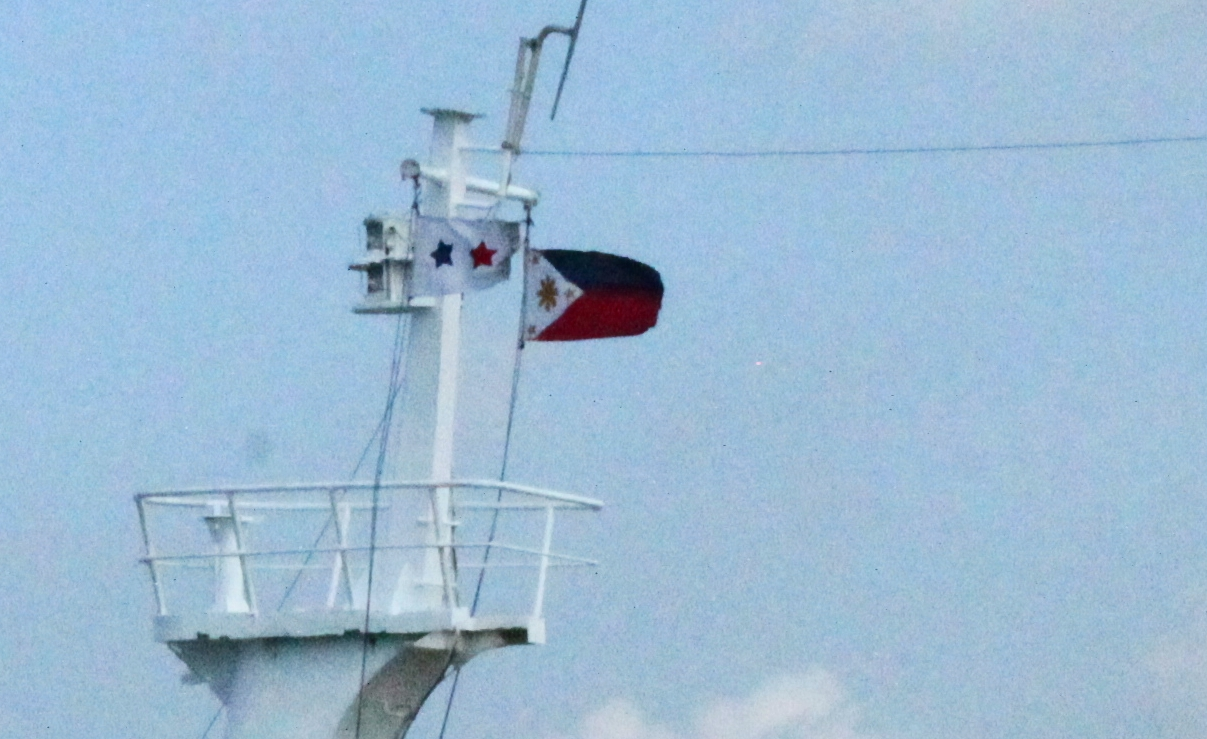
The Philippine coastwise emblem along with the Philippine flag flown at the main-mast of Montenegro Lines's MV Maria Diana.

The Philippine coastwise emblem is a flag flown at main-mast of marine vessels engaged in coastwise trade in the Philippines. Coastwise trade in the country is defined as the transfer of either merchandise or passengers between two seaports in the Philippines.

The flag was first adopted in 1903, following the passage of the Coastwise Trade Act of 1902 by the Insular Government of the Philippine Islands. Coastwise trade in the country is restricted to vessels with Philippine registry with a coastwise license secured from the Maritime Industry Authority. All licensed vessels must fly the Philippine coastwise emblem when entering or leaving Philippine seaports during daytime.

Under law, the Philippine coastwise emblem is defined to consist of a white rectangular flags with two stars (one blue, one red; from the staff to tip) in the horizontal median line.
