= Philippine five-peso note =

Five pesos
- Country: Philippines
- Value: 5 pesos
- Width: 160 mm
- Height: 66 mm
- Security features: Security fibers, Watermark, See-through registration device, Concealed value, Security thread
- Material used: 90% cotton 10% linen
- Years of printing: 1985–1995

Obverse
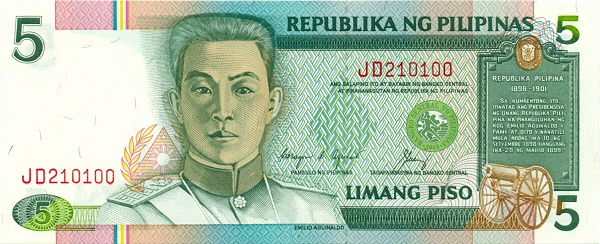
- Design: Emilio Aguinaldo, Philippine independence marker
- Designer: Romeo Mananquil
- Design date: 1985

Reverse
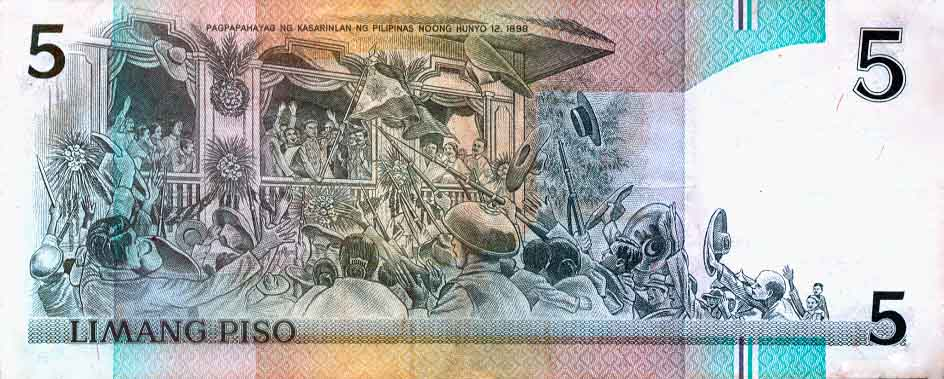
- Design: Declaration of Philippine independence
- Designer: Romeo Mananquil
- Design date: 1985

The Philippine five-peso note (Filipino: Limang Piso) (₱5) was a denomination of Philippine currency. Philippine president Emilio Aguinaldo is featured on the front side of the note, and the Declaration of the Philippine Independence on the reverse side. This banknote was circulated until the demonetization of main banknotes under the New Design/BSP series on January 3, 2018. Its printing was stopped when it was replaced by the BSP series five-peso coins, also featuring Aguinaldo, in June 1995.

== History ==
=== Pre-independence ===
- 1903: Philippine Islands issued silver certificates. Features a portrait of William McKinley.
- 1908: Banco Español Filipino issued notes.
- 1918: Philippine Treasury Certificates issued with a portrait of William McKinley. Design revised from 1929 to also include the portrait of George Dewey.
- 1920: BPI issued notes.
- 1936: PNB issued notes.
- 1937: Philippine Commonwealth issued treasury certificate. Features the portraits of William McKinley and George Dewey on both sides of the obverse. This series were later overprinted with the word "VICTORY" on the reverse after the liberation of the Philippines under Japanese rule in 1944.
- 1942: Japanese government issued series. Features a farmer in a forest on the right of the obverse, with the number "5" on the center. Another version, this time featuring the Rizal Monument on the right of the obverse, was released in 1944. The banknotes ceased to be legal tender after the liberation.
- 1949: The five peso bill issues whoever in "VICTORY, CENTRAL BANK OF THE PHILIPPINES" at back

=== Version history ===
	Philippines (1936-1941)	Victory Series No. 66 (1944)	Victory-CBP Banknote Series (1949)
Obverse			
Reverse			

=== Independence ===
==== English series (1951–1974) ====
Features the portraits of Marcelo H. Del Pilar and Graciano Lopez-Jaena, two important figures of the Propaganda movement before the Philippine revolution, on the obverse. The reverse features the official newspaper of the propaganda movement, the La Solidaridad.

==== Pilipino series (1969–1974) ====
In 1967, Andres Bonifacio replaced the portraits of Del Pilar and Lopez-Jaena. The note is now predominantly green in color. On the reverse, it now features the scenario of how to be a member of the Katipunan through signing a contract by their own blood. The design of the obverse was later revised, the font for the text Republika ng Pilipinas and Limang Piso was changed, the color of the portrait of Bonifacio was changed from brown to green and geometric lines were added on the sides and the watermark area of the bill. This design was later used when the Bagong Lipunan series was released in 1973.

==== Ang Bagong Lipunan series (1973–1996) ====
In 1973, the "Ang Bagong Lipunan" text was added and was overprinted on the watermark area.

==== New Design series (1985–2018) ====
In 1985, the bill was completely redesigned and Emilio Aguinaldo replaced Bonifacio in this series. The NHCP historical marker in the Malolos Cathedral indicating the foundation of the First Philippine Republic in Filipino language, which Aguinaldo became its president) along with a cannon can be seen on the right side of the obverse. On the reverse, a scene from the Declaration of the Philippine Independence is featured. This was previously featured on the reverse of the Ang Bagong Lipunan series two peso banknote. The banknote was designed by Romeo Mananquil.

After the creation of the "Bangko Sentral ng Pilipinas", its new logo was incorporated on all the New Design series bills in 1993.

In June 1995, the printing of this banknote was stopped after the Bangko Sentral ng Pilipinas released the new BSP Series ₱5 coin denomination on that same month. Because of this, it is the only banknote in the New Design/BSP Series to do not feature the printing year as it was only implemented in 1997 (ten-peso banknotes) and 1998 (rest of the banknotes in the series) when production for the five peso note was already stopped two to three years earlier. Only 303,000,000 banknotes were produced at the time when the BSP Series name is now used (with the 1993 BSP logo) which were printed from July 1993 to June 1995, with the notes using the letters "MQ" in red text and 1993 logo being the last prefix used and batch of banknotes printed during its production. However, the banknote had a spiritual successor seven years later in June 12, 2002 which is the Philippine two hundred-peso note due to its depiction of Aguinaldo Shrine and also having green color, and was printed from 2002 to 2020. Existing printed banknotes, along with 10-peso notes, continued to be seen commonly in circulation from 1995 to 2004, and from 2004 until the demonetization of main banknotes under the New Design Series on January 3, 2018, it still had a liability of the BSP (with January 2018 submission of old banknotes are only for those who secure a receipt showing that they went to the central bank before the December 29, 2017 final deadline of submission due to not being able to accommodate several individuals who tried to exchange their notes because of the unexpected number of people who arrived) although now rarely circulated.

=== Version history ===
	English Series (1951–1974)	Pilipino Series (1969–1974)	Ang Bagong Lipunan Series (1973–1996)	New Design/BSP Series (1985–2018)
Obverse				
Reverse				

== Commemorative issues ==
Throughout its existence, the five peso bill was often overprinted to commemorate certain events, namely:

- State visit of President Corazon Aquino to the United States of America: In 1986, Bangko Sentral ng Pilipinas released a commemorative banknote for the commemoration of state visit of President Corazon Aquino to the United States. The overprint features the seal of the Philippine President with the words "PAGDALAW NG PANGULONG CORAZON C. AQUINO SA AMERIKA" and the date "SET. 15-23, 1986" is displayed below.
- Canonization of Lorenzo Ruiz: The overprint features the first Filipino saint named San Lorenzo Ruiz with the words "KANONISASYON NG PINAGPALANG SAN LORENZO RUIZ" and the date "OKTUBRE 18, 1987".
- 40th anniversary of the Bangko Sentral ng Pilipinas: BSP released the overprint in commemoration of its 40th anniversary. It is printed in red, has the words "IKA-40 ANIBERSARYO" and "BANGKO SENTRAL NG PILIPINAS - 1949-1989" and features its building in Manila.
- Commemoration of Women's rights: The overprint features a portrait of a woman holding a Philippine flag and around it has the words "KABABAIHAN PARA SA KAUNLARAN - 1990".
- Plenary Council of the Philippines: Features a cross, the Philippine map on the lower-right corner of the circle, and the PX monogram. Around it are the words "UNITE ALL THINGS UNDER CHRIST (EPH 1:10)", "II PLENARY COUNCIL OF THE PHILIPPINES", and below it is the date "20 JANUARY TO 17 FEBRUARY 1991". This is the only time the overprint is in English language and the only commemorative banknote that features the signature of BSP governor Jose L. Cuisia, Jr.

== Printing years ==
Banknote series	Year	President of the Philippines	BSP Governor	Prefix
English Series	1951–1953	Elpidio Quirino	Miguel Cuaderno Sr.	A–F
English Series	1953–1957	Ramon Magsaysay	Miguel Cuaderno Sr.	G–AY
English Series	1957–1960	Carlos P. Garcia	Miguel Cuaderno Sr.	AZ–BH
English Series	1961	Carlos P. Garcia	Andres V. Castillo	BJ–BV
English Series	1961–1965	Diosdado P. Macapagal	Andres V. Castillo	BW–ER
English Series	1970	Ferdinand E. Marcos	Gregorio S. Licaros	ES–FG
Pilipino Series	1969–1970	Ferdinand E. Marcos	Alfonso Calalang	A–F
Pilipino Series	1969–1970	Ferdinand E. Marcos	Gregorio S. Licaros	G–Q
Ang Bagong Lipunan Series	1973–1981	Ferdinand E. Marcos	Gregorio S. Licaros	AH–VR
Ang Bagong Lipunan Series	1981–1984	Ferdinand E. Marcos	Jaime C. Laya	VS (Black)– HQ (Red)
Ang Bagong Lipunan Series	1984–1985	Ferdinand E. Marcos	Jose B. Fernandez Jr.	HR–PG
New Design Series	1985–1986	Ferdinand E. Marcos	Jose B. Fernandez Jr.	A–BE
New Design Series	1986–1990	Corazon C. Aquino	Jose B. Fernandez Jr.	BF–ZZ (Black), A–E, HV (Red)
New Design Series	1990–1992	Corazon C. Aquino	Jose L. Cuisia Jr.	BG–SR
New Design Series	1992–1993	Fidel V. Ramos	Jose L. Cuisia Jr.	SM–XW
New Design Series	1993–1995	Fidel V. Ramos	Gabriel C. Singson	A–MQ

== See also ==
- Philippine five-peso coin
- Philippine two hundred-peso note
