= Jaime C. Laya =

Filipino banker (born 1939)

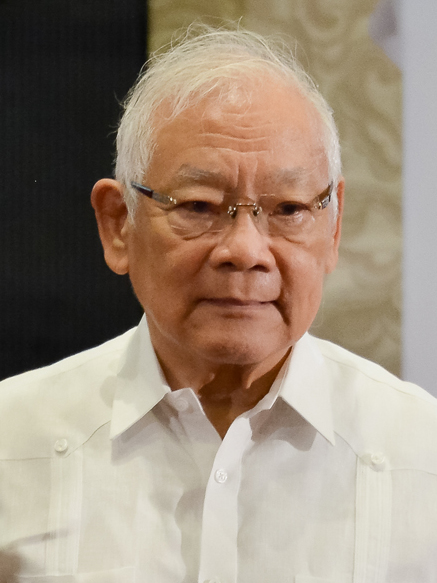
- Laya in 2019

5th Governor of the Central Bank of the Philippines
- In office January 16, 1981 – January 18, 1984
- President: Ferdinand Marcos
- Preceded by: Gregorio Licaros
- Succeeded by: Jose B. Fernandez Jr.
Other offices 1981–2001
1st Minister of Budget and Management
In office June 12, 1978 – January 12, 1981
President	Ferdinand Marcos
Prime Minister	Cesar Virata
Preceded by	Position created
Succeeded by	Manuel Alba
1st Action Officer of the Intramuros Administration
In office April 10, 1979 – April 16, 1986
President	Ferdinand Marcos; Corazon Aquino
Preceded by	Position created
Succeeded by	Eustacio Orobia (as Administrator of the Intramuros Administration)
39th Minister of Education, Culture and Sports
In office January 18, 1984 – February 25, 1986
President	Ferdinand Marcos
Prime Minister	Cesar Virata
Preceded by	Onofre Corpuz
Succeeded by	Lourdes Quisumbing (as Secretary of Education, Culture and Sports)
Chairman of the National Commission for Culture and the Arts
In office 1996–2001
President	Fidel Ramos; Joseph Estrada; Gloria Macapagal Arroyo

Mambabatas Pambansa (Assemblyman) from the Minister of Budget and Management
- In office June 12, 1978 – January 12, 1981
- Preceded by: Position created
- Succeeded by: Manuel Alba

Chairman of the Cultural Center of the Philippines
- Incumbent
- Assumed office June 30, 2022
- President: Bongbong Marcos
- Preceded by: Margie Moran

Personal details
- Born: Jaime del Carmen Laya; January 8, 1939 (age 87) Manila, Philippines
- Party: Independent (1981–present)
- Other political affiliations: KBL (1978–1981)
- Spouse: Alicia S. Laya (d. 1991)
- Education: University of the Philippines Diliman (BBA); Georgia Institute of Technology (M.A. Indus. Management); Stanford Graduate School of Business (Ph.D. Finance)
- Occupation: Cultural administrator
- Profession: Banker; Accountant

Jaime del Carmen Laya, better known as Jimmy Laya (born January 8, 1939) is a Filipino banker, accountant, and cultural administrator who served as the first Secretary of the Department of Budget and Management (as Minister of Budget) of the Republic of the Philippines, serving from 1978 to 1981. He was also the 5th governor of the Central Bank of the Philippines from 1981 to 1984 and later served as the Minister of Education, Culture and Sports from 1984 until 1986. His terms in civil service, covered two significant points in Philippine history, the election that made former President Ferdinand Marcos have his third term and the assassination of the late Senator Benigno S. Aquino Jr. that stimulated the People Power Revolution of 1986.

In between his political appointments to key government departments during the Marcos dictatorship, Laya also served as the first Action Officer of the Intramuros Administration. Later on, his work in cultural administration continued upon his appointment as Chairman of the National Commission for Culture and the Arts (NCCA) from 1996 until 2001. Since 2022, he presently serves as the Chairman of the Cultural Center of the Philippines.

He also served as the Dean of the College of Business Administration, now the Cesar E.A. Virata School of Business, of the University of the Philippines Diliman, and board of director of Audit and Risk Management Committee of the Philippine media conglomerate GMA Network Inc.

== Personal life and education ==
Born to Juan Cabreros Laya, noted author and Silvina del Carmen, an educator who were the founders of the Philippine publishing house, Kayumanggi Press. In 1956, Laya joined the Pan Xenia Fraternity and a year later, he graduated magna cum laude with a degree in business administration from the University of the Philippines Diliman. Later, he took up a master's degree in industrial management from the Georgia Institute of Technology. He did his graduate studies in finance at the Stanford Graduate School of Business of Stanford University from which he graduated with a doctoral degree in 1965.

Laya is a member of the Pan Xenia Fraternity.

He was married to Alicia Laya, who later died during the 1990 earthquake in Baguio.

== Career ==
Laya started off teaching accounting, economics, and management courses at UP after his graduation in 1957. At the age of 18, he placed eighth in the 1957 CPA examination. Laya served numerous positions in different government agencies. He rose to the rank of professor of accounting and director of graduate studies at the University of the Philippines Diliman College of Business Administration (present-day the Cesar E.A. Virata School of Business) and subsequently became its dean from 1969 to 1975, succeeding Cesar E.A. Virata who later served as Prime Minister during the Marcos dictatorship. In 1966, as an assistant professor, Laya became the inaugural recipient of the IBM Philippines Chair in Business Administration of the UP College of Business Administration, which was sponsored by IBM Philippines and the Ford Foundation.

=== Government service ===
In 1978, President Ferdinand Marcos appointed Laya to serve as the first Minister of Budget and Management handling the portfolios of distribution of the general appropriations of the government.

Laya was later appointed as the 5th Governor of the Central Bank of the Philippines from 1981 to 1984 and was the Minister of Education, Culture and Sports from 1984 to 1986. Whilst helming as Governor of the Central Bank from 1981 until 1984, Laya initiated the purchase of important works of Philippine art and significant pieces of pre-Hispanic ancestral gold in the Philippines. These works are part of the permanent collection of the Museo ng Bangko Sentral ng Pilipinas.

Laya was also the president of the Southeast Asian Ministers of Education Council from 1985 to 1986 and chairman of the Ad Hoc Working Group on International Standards of Accounting and Reporting of the United Nations Center on Transnational Corporations from 1980 to 1983. He also chaired the Philippine Delegations to the International Monetary Fund and the World Bank, the Southeast Asian Central Banks Association, and the United Nations Educational, Cultural and Scientific Organization (UNESCO).

=== Private sector ===
Following his retirement from public office in 1986, Laya proceeded to found the accounting firm, J.C. Laya and Co., Ltd., subsequently renamed Laya, Mananghaya and Co. (now known as KPMG Philippines), where he acted as chairman until his retirement in 2004. In 2003, he assumed the roles of chairman and president of the Association of Certified Public Accountants in Public Practice (ACPAPP) and, in 2004, of ACAPP Foundation, Inc.

He was previously the chairman of the publicly listed Philtrust Bank, CIBI Information, Inc., Dual Tech Foundation, Inc and Don Norberto Ty Foundation. Laya serves as Director for Victorias Milling Company, Inc., Philippine AXA Life Insurance Company, Manila Polo Club and GMA Network, Inc., the Philippine Ratings Services Corporation, the Philippines-Mexico Business Council, and the Philippines-Spain Business Council.

== Cultural administrator and writer ==
=== Action Officer of the Intramuros Administration (1979–1986) ===
In 1979, President Ferdinand Marcos appointed Laya to be the first Action Officer of the Intramuros Administration (IA), a government agency tasked with orderly restoring, administering, and developing the historic walled area of Intramuros, including the fortifications of the Baluarte de San Diego and the Gates of Intramuros. During his tenure, he led the acquisition of various ecclesiastical and decorative arts collections for the IA, forming the basis of the present collections at the Museo de Intramuros and Casa Manila. Furthermore, as the Action Officer, he spearheaded the publication of numerous monographs on the history of Intramuros and Philippine arts and culture.

=== Chairman of the National Commission of Culture and Arts (1996–2001) ===
In 1996, President Fidel Ramos appointed Laya to helm as the Chairman of the National Commission of Culture and Arts (NCCA), where he initiated projects and programs in the promotion of Philippine arts both domestically and overseas.

=== Trustee of the Cultural Center of the Philippines (2010–2022) ===
In 2010, President Benigno Aquino III appointed Laya as one of the board of trustees of the Cultural Center of the Philippines (CCP). It was during his term as trustee that CCP held the controversial Kulo exhibition with the installation art piece titled Poleteismo by Philippine contemporary artist Mideo Cruz, which was largely criticized by the largely Roman Catholic Philippine population. Laya, along with the rest of the CCP Board, faced criminal complaints before the Ombudsman. The complaints were dismissed for lack of merit in 2013.

=== Chairman of the Cultural Center of the Philippines (2022–present) ===
In 2022, President Bongbong Marcos appointed Laya to be the Chairman of the Cultural Center of the Philippines with the primary task of overseeing the renovation of the Tanghalang Pambansa, with plans to reopen the building by 2025. Consequently, Laya is one of two former officials from the previous martial law period to join the Marcos Jr. administration, the other being Juan Ponce Enrile.

== Writings ==
=== Wala Lang column ===
Laya has authored numerous books and other publications comprising compilations of his various essays and writings on Philippine history, arts, and culture. The majority of his published works have centered on Intramuros, where he collaborated with Esperanza Gatbonton on Intramuros of Memory released in 1983 and subsequently reissued in 2011. He has also delved into the realm of Philippine architecture, co-authoring Philippine Heritage Homes: A Guidebook in 2014 with antiquarian Sonny Tinio and architect Maria Cristina Turalba. Presently, Laya contributes a column titled Wala Lang to the Manila Bulletin, dedicated to his reflections on Philippine art, culture, and politics.

He also serves as a trustee for De La Salle University Manila, St. Paul University Manila, the Metropolitan Museum of Manila, the Yuchengco Museum, the Heart Foundation of the Philippines, Inc., the Fundacion Santiago, ABS-CBN Foundation, Inc., Dañgal ng Bulacan Foundation, Cofradia de la Immaculada Concepcion and Escuela Taller de Filipinas Foundation, Inc. where he served as chairman of the board of trustees.

== Bibliography ==
Books and Publications

- A Cash Flow Model and the Rate of Return: The Effect of Price Level Change and Other Factors on Book-Yield (1975)
- Budgetary Innovation in the New Society (1977)
- Philippine Government Budgeting: Policy and Practice in the New Society (1980)
- A Crisis of Confidence and Other Papers: A Compilation of Papers and Speeches Completed in 1981 (1982)
- Intramuros of Memory (1983) (co-authored with Esperanza B. Gatbonton)
- Gearing for Recovery and Other Papers: A Compilation of Papers and Speeches Completed in 1982 (1983)
- A Period of Adjustment and Other Papers: A Compilation of Papers and Speeches Completed in 1983 and 1984 (1984)
- A Question of Quality and Other Papers: A Compilation of Papers and Speeches Completed in 1984 (1985)
- Moving Forward in Education and Other Papers: A Compilation of Papers and Speeches Completed in 1985 (1986)
- Philippine Education Indicators: 1965-1985 (1986)
- Larawan: Immortality and Identity in Filipino Portraiture (1988) (co-authored with Luciano P.R. Santiago and Regalado Trota Jose)
- And Life Goes On: Memoirs of Purita Kalaw-Ledesma (1994) (co-authored with Purita Kalaw Ledesma) (as annotator)
- Prusisyon: Philippine Religious Pageantry (1996) (co-authored with Lulu Tesoro Castañeda)
- Letras y Figuras: Business in Culture, Culture in Business (2001)
- Philippine Cultural and Artistic Landmarks of the Past Millennium (2001) (as editor)
- Consuming Passions: Philippine Collectibles (2003) (as editor)
- Tanáw: Perspectives on the Bangko Sentral ng Pilipinas Painting Collection (2005) (co-authored with Cid Reyes, Alice Guillermo, Ma. Victoria Herrera, Fatima J. Lasay and edited by Ramon E.S. Lerma)
- Potlock Hidalgo Bonding: A Family Heritage Cookbook (2006) (co-edited with Adelaida Lim)
- Herencia - A Legacy of Art and Progress: The Bank of the Philippine Islands Collection (2008) (co-authored with Cid Reyes, Alice Guillermo, Ma. Victoria Herrera, Nicanor G. Tiongson and edited by Ramon N. Villegas)
- Hidden Treasures: Simple Pleasures (2008) (co-authored with Mariano C. Lao and Edilberto B. Bravo)
- Santa Ana Church: A Historical Guide (2008)
- Wala Lang: 500-Word Articles on Philippine Life & Culture (2012)
- Philippine Heritage Homes: A Guidebook (2014) (co-authored with Martin I. Tinio, Jr. and Ma. Cristina V. Turalba)
- Wala Lang II: 500-Word Articles on Philippine Life & Culture (2015)
- Wala Lang III: 500-Word Articles on Philippine Life & Culture (2018)
- In Dialogue: The Economic Managers of the Marcos Administration (2020) (co-authored with Placido L. Mapa, Jr., Estelito P. Mendoza, Vicente T. Paterno, Gerardo P. Sicat and Cesar E.A. Virata)
- The Art and Times of the Seventies (2020) (co-authored with Corazon S. Alvina, Augusto M.R. Gonzalez III, Lisa Guerrero Nakpil and Marian Pastor Roces)
- Wala Lang IV: Articles on Philippine Life & Culture (2021)

Contributor in Books and Other Publications

- The Filipino Drama, 1905 by Arthur Stanley Riggs (1981) (Note: This book is a new edition of The Filipino Drama by Arthur Stanley Riggs in 1905.) (with introduction by Doreen Fernandez)
- Magnificat: Mama Mary's Pilgrim Sites (2012) (edited by Cecilia Brainard)
- My BenCab: Collectors Tell Their Stories (2018) (edited by Thelma Sioson San Juan)

Government offices
Preceded by Gregorio Licaros	Governor of the Central Bank of the Philippines; 1981–1984	Succeeded by Jose B. Fernandez Jr.
House of Representatives of the Philippines
New constituency	Member of Parliament for Minister of Budget and Management; 1978–1981	Succeeded by Manuel Alba
Political offices
Preceded by Onofre Corpuz	Minister of Education, Culture and Sports; 1984–1986	Succeeded by Lourdes Quisumbing as Secretary of Education, Culture and Sports
New office	Action Officer of the Intramuros Administration; 1979–1986	Succeeded by Eustacio Orobia as Administrator of the Intramuros Administration
New office	Minister of Budget and Management; 1978–1981	Succeeded by Manuel Alba
Preceded by Margie Moran	Chairman of the Cultural Center of the Philippines; 2022–present	Incumbent
