= Philippine five-peso coin =

Philippine coin

Five pesos
- Philippines
- Value: 5.00 Philippine pesos
- Mass: 7.4 g
- Diameter: 25 mm
- Thickness: 2.20 mm
- Edge: Plain (1975–1982; 1995–present); Reeded (1991–1994); Plain/Nonagonal (9-sided shape): 2019–present)
- Composition: Nickel (1975–1982); Nickel-brass (1991–2017); Nickel-plated steel (2017–present)
- Years of minting: 1975–1982; 1991–present

Obverse
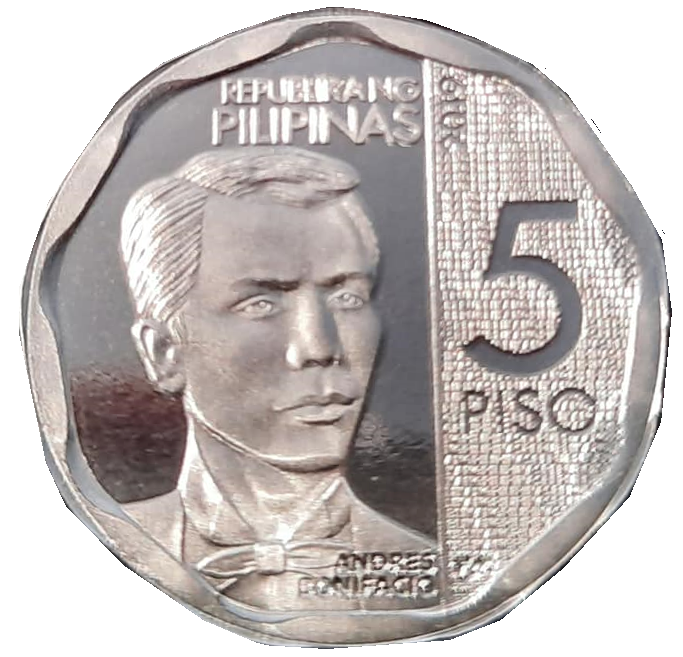
- Design: Portrait of Andrés Bonifacio, Year Mark
- Design date: 2019

Reverse
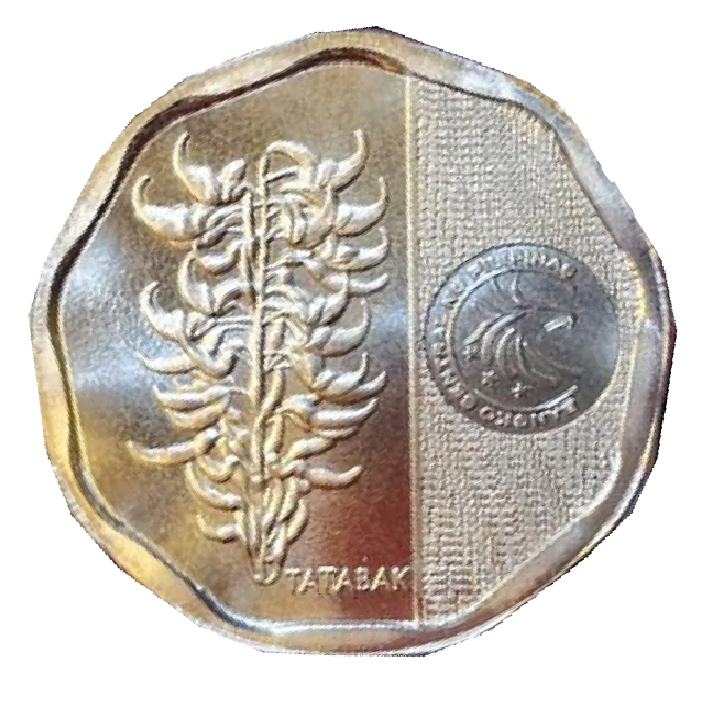
- Design: Tayabak, Logo of the Bangko Sentral ng Pilipinas
- Design date: 2019

The Philippine five-peso coin (₱5) is the third-largest denomination of the coins of the Philippine peso.

Three versions of the coin are in circulation, the version from the BSP Series which was issued from 1995 to 2017, the original round coin from the New Generation Currency Coin Series and the nonagonal (9-sided shape) version since 2017 and 2019, respectively. The original and updated versions from the NGC series are measured at 25 mm (0.98 in) in diameter and feature a portrait of Filipino revolutionary leader Andrés Bonifacio on the obverse. The reverse side depicts the Tayabak, a type of Philippine vine and the current logo of the Bangko Sentral ng Pilipinas.

Firstly, the five-peso coin was produced in conjunction with the five peso note, from the year 1975 to 1982 and again from April 1, 1991, until production for its banknote version became obsolete when the Bangko Sentral ng Pilipinas (BSP) stopped printing the banknotes upon the introduction of the coin's BSP Series version in June 1995 due to the note's faster wear and tear from everyday use.

== History ==
=== Independence ===
==== Ang Bagong Lipunan Series ====
From 1975 to 1982, a five-peso coin was introduced by the Bangko Sentral ng Pilipinas (BSP) in line with the new 'Ang Bagong Lipunan' series issued in commemoration of Fedinand Marcos' declaration of Martial Law. The obverse bears the inscription 'Ang Bagong Lipunan,' year of minting, and a profile of Marcos, who was the president throughout the circulation of the coins, faced to the left. Marcos himself approved the coins with his own face. The denomination, the inscription 'Republika ng Pilipinas' and its official coat of arms, are all on the reverse. This coin rarely circulated due to its large size and since it coexisted with the 2-peso and 5-peso notes.

==== Flora and Fauna Series ====
From 1991 to 1994, a new five-peso coin was issued. The obverse now features the inscription 'Republika ng Pilipinas' and a profile of Emilio Aguinaldo, a Filipino revolutionary, politician, and a military leader officially recognized as the first president of the Philippines, now faced to the right. An enlarged denomination and an image of the fruit of the Pterocarpus indicus or narra tree, the official national tree of the Philippines, are all on the reverse.

==== BSP Coin Series ====
Issued in June 1995, the BSP Coin Series version of the coin features the enlarged denomination on the obverse, while the inscription 'Bangko Sentral ng Pilipinas' and its official seal are all on the reverse. The reed on its edge was also removed. The name is narrower from 1995 to 1998 and wider from 1999 to 2017. It was released to replace the BSP Series five peso banknote with the 1993 logo that was only in production for 2 years from July 1993 to the said month of 1995.

==== New Generation Currency Coin Series ====
Issued on November 30, 2017, on the 154th birth anniversary of Andrés Bonifacio, the new five-peso coin was released ahead of the other denominations of the new currency series. It has been given new features to prevent counterfeiting. The obverse features Filipino revolutionary leader Andrés Bonifacio, and the reverse depicts a tayabak (Strongylodon macrobotrys), a type of Filipino vine. Each individual coin weighs 7.4 grams (0.26 oz), has a diameter of 25 millimeters (0.98 in), and has a smooth edge without ridges. The coin's design was criticized for being too similar to the ₱1 coin, since they are both colored silver, circular, and nearly the same size. However, it was also praised for inputting national hero Andrés Bonifacio and replacing Emilio Aguinaldo, who ordered Bonifacio's execution during the Philippine Revolution.

In September 2019, then-BSP Governor Benjamin Diokno announced that due to the confusion between the ₱5 coin and the ₱1 coin, a new "enhanced" ₱5 coin would be released in December 2019. It was initially said to be scallop-edged but a later report on November 29, 2019, showed it as nonagon-shaped, with the rim being scalloped in the inside.

=== Version history ===
	Ang Bagong Lipunan Series (1975–1982)	Flora and Fauna Series (1991–1994)	BSP Coin Series (1995–2017)	New Generation Currency Coin Series (2017–present)
Obverse				
Reverse				

== Commemorative coins ==
On December 19, 2014, the Bangko Sentral ng Pilipinas (BSP) published an announcement that three new limited edition commemorative coins is to be circulated, which was then released three days later. This includes the Bagong Bayani Commemorative Coin and the 70th anniversary Leyte Landing commemorative five-peso coin.

== See also ==
- Philippine five-peso note
