= Arthur Riggs =

Arthur Riggs is the name of:

- Arthur Riggs (geneticist) (1939−2022), geneticist who worked with Genentech to express the first artificial gene in bacteria
- Arthur Stanley Riggs (1879−1952), American writer, editor and historian
