= Philippine Deposit Insurance Corporation =

Government-run deposit insurance fund

- Type: State-owned
- Industry: Finance
- Founded: June 22, 1963; 63 years ago
- Headquarters: Makati, Metro Manila, Philippines
- Key people: Eli M. Remolona Jr.(Chairperson (Note: An ex-officio member through the Governor of the Bangko Sentral ng Pilipinas role)); Ralph Recto (Vice–Chairperson (Note: An ex-officio member through the Finance Secretary role)); Roberto B. Tan (President and Chief Executive Officer)
- Services: Deposit insurance funds; Bank examination and resolution; Receivership and liquidation of closed banks
- Owner: Government of the Philippines
- Website: www.pdic.gov.ph

The Philippine Deposit Insurance Corporation (PDIC; Filipino: Korporasyon ng Pilipinas sa Seguro ng Deposito) is a Philippine government-owned and controlled corporation providing deposit insurance to depositors in Philippine banks, such as commercial banks, savings banks, mortgage banks, stock savings and loan associations, development banks, cooperative banks, rural banks, and domestic branches of foreign banks. It was established on June 22, 1963 by virtue of Republic Act No. 3591.

The primary function of PDIC is to protect small depositors and strengthen the public's confidence in the Philippine banking system. PDIC guarantees deposits up to ₱1,000,000. PDIC receives guidance from the International Association of Deposit Insurers.

== History ==
=== Establishment ===
On June 22, 1963, PDIC was created through Republic Act No. 3591. The law provided the following:

- Deposit insurance coverage for banks
- Maximum deposit insurance of ₱10,000 per depositor
- Maximum assessment rate of 1/12 of 1% assessable deposits per annum
- Voluntary insurance membership with PDIC
- Permanent deposit insurance fund at ₱5,000,000
- Formation of a three-member Board of Directors

In 1969, membership to PDIC became compulsory for all banks through Republic Act No. 6037. In 1970, PDIC started collecting the maximum assessment rate of 1/18 of 1% of net assessable deposits per annum.

In the same year, the first payout was given to the Rural Bank of Nabua, as authorized by the Board. On July 6, 1970, initially one claim agent was assigned to handle the payout, although a transfer deposit scheme with the Rural Bank of Rinconada was later arranged to facilitate claims payment.

In 1978, Presidential Decree No. 1451 was issued, which increased the maximum deposit insurance coverage was increased to ₱15,000 per depositor.

=== 1980s ===
In 1984, Presidential Decree No. 1897 was issued, which again increased the maximum deposit insurance coverage to ₱40,000 per depositor. In the same year, the following reforms were undertaken through Presidential Decree No. 1940:

- PDIC made a preferred creditor over unsecured creditors
- Trust accounts excluded from insurance coverage
- Minimum assessment premium paid by banks set at ₱250

In 1988, the World Bank report on strengthening the financial sector was completed and recommended a greater role for PDIC in the supervision and examination of banks and in handling distressed banks. The World Bank recommended PDIC to be appointed as the mandatory receiver and liquidator of closed banks, and its financial and manpower resources reinforced. As a result, PDIC had taken the following actions:

- Drafted an Institutional Strengthening Program laying the groundwork for a company-wide restructuring to cope with the expanded function
- Set upgraded standards, hiring procedures and intensive training programs
- Pioneered innovations in systems and procedures with emphasis on computerization and automation

In 1989, liquidity pools were set up to contribute to the stability in the rural banking system by immediately addressing temporary liquidity requirements of rural banks. Under this scheme, rural banks contributed a portion of their liquid assets, which the Land Bank of the Philippines matched. The funds were invested in high-yielding, risk-free government securities, which can be availed of by member rural banks in the event of liquidity crisis. PDIC also maintained a credit line in case more funds are needed. After four years, there were already 27 liquidity pools created composed of 429 rural banks.

=== 1990s ===
In the following year, PDIC joined a World Bank mission, with then-Central Bank of the Philippines and Land Bank of the Philippines, that created the Countryside Financial Institutions Enhancement Program (CFIEP) aimed at transforming rural banks into formidable agents of countryside development. The program helped rural banks to reduce burden of debt to CB, raise capital, attain economies of scale and become more competitive in the banking system. CFIEP Module 1 provided for infusion of fresh equity from existing stockholders and new investors. Module 2 focused on incentives in enhancing capital, while Module 3 provided incentives for merging and consolidation.

Republic Act No. 7400 was enacted on April 13, 1992, amending Republic Act No. 3591, and providing, among other changes:

- Increased maximum deposit insurance coverage to ₱100,000 from ₱40,000
- Adjusted assessment rate to a maximum of 1/5 of 1% of total deposit liabilities
- Increased Permanent Insurance Fund to ₱3 billion from ₱2 billion
- Authority to conduct independent examination of banks
- Assumption of liabilities as an additional mode of financial assistance
- Mandated as receiver and liquidator of banks ordered closed by the Monetary Board
- Amendment to the composition of the PDIC Board of Directors, designating the Finance Secretary as chairman, PDIC President as vice-chairman, Governor of the Bangko Sentral ng Pilipinas as member, and two representatives from the private sector.

Also in 1992, PDIC established an office building at 2228 Pasong Tamo Street, Makati City.

In 1996, innovations were adopted to facilitate claims payment, including:

- Approval of scheme allowing immediate payment of claims with balances not exceeding ₱500 after these are validated, instead of passing through the usual rigorous deposit examination
- Direct cash payment of deposit accounts with balances not exceeding ₱1,000
- Simplification of documentary requirements to support claims for accounts of deceased depositors with deposit balances not exceeding ₱5,000
- Establishment of emergency pay-out facility to enable PDIC to respond to humanitarian needs of depositors. The facility allows the PDIC President to approve payment of the actual amount of claims or ₱5,000, whichever is lower, even before the official start of the claims settlement operations in a closed bank. Said amount was subsequently increased up to the MDIC of ₱100,000.

=== 2000s ===
In 2004, the institution made amendments with the goal of protecting depositors from loss. Republic Act No. 9302, or the Amendments to the PDIC Charter, was passed into law. The amendments aimed to provide heightened depositor protection. Major provisions included:

- Increase in the maximum deposit insurance coverage to ₱250,000 from ₱100,000
- Restoration of PDIC's authority to examine banks with prior approval by the Monetary Board
- Continuing insurance coverage of banks
- Grant of financial assistance to distressed banks under systemic risk conditions
- Authority to investigate banks on frauds, irregularities, and anomalies based on complaints received and reports of bank examinations
- Enhancement of PDIC's receivership and liquidation authority

Single digit turnaround time in claims settlement operations from bank takeover was achieved for all banks closed during the year, with average turnaround time at 8 days.

PDIC, as liquidator, completed 78 final projects of distribution (POD) for closed banks. POD refers to the specific distribution plan of a closed bank's assets and is submitted to the Liquidation Court for approval.

Additional amendments took place in PDIC in 2009. The PDIC Charter was amended with the passage of Republic Act No. 9576 that took effect on June 1, 2009. The most significant provisions were:

- Increase in the maximum deposit insurance coverage from ₱250,000 to ₱500,000
- Grant of the flexibility to adjust the maximum deposit insurance coverage in case of a condition that threatens the monetary and financial stability of the banking system, subject to the approval by the President of the Philippines
- Grant of institutional and financial strengthening measures to mitigate moral hazard and beef up the Deposit Insurance Fund

During the year, the PDIC laid the foundation for new initiatives aimed at invigorating the banking sector, particularly rural banks, through the Strengthening Program for Rural Banks funded at ₱5 billion and the support program, the Investor-Investee Helpdesk.

The PDIC adopted the Corporate Governance Code and implemented the Citizen's Charter.

President Jose C. Nograles was elected to the Executive Council of International Association of Deposit Insurers.

=== 2020s ===
Effective March 15, 2025, the maximum deposit insurance coverage provided by the PDIC has been increased from ₱500,000.00 to ₱1,000,000.00 per depositor per bank. The increase in the maximum deposit insurance coverage was approved by the PDIC Board of Directors to provide enhanced protection and more confidence for the depositing public.

== See also ==
- List of financial supervisory authorities by country
