= Medalla =

Medalla is a Spanish word meaning medal. It may also refer to:

- Medalla Light, a Puerto Rican beer produced by Cervecera de Puerto Rico
- David Medalla (born 1942), Filipino international artist
- Felipe Medalla, Filipino economist
