= Felipe Medalla =

Filipino economist and central bank governor

Felipe M. Medalla
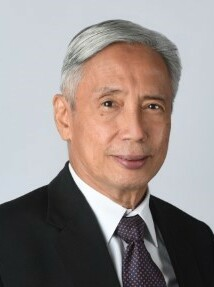

6th Governor of the Bangko Sentral ng Pilipinas
- In office June 30, 2022 – July 3, 2023
- President: Bongbong Marcos
- Deputy: Francisco G. Dakila, Jr. Eduardo G. Bobier; Chuchi G. Fonacier; Mamerto Tangonan; Bernadette Romulo-Puyat
- Preceded by: Benjamin Diokno
- Succeeded by: Eli M. Remolona, Jr.

Member of the Monetary Board of the Bangko Sentral ng Pilipinas

9th Director-General of the National Economic and Development Authority Concurrently Secretary of Socioeconomic Planning
- In office June 30, 1998 – January 20, 2001
- President: Joseph Estrada
- Preceded by: Cielito Habito
- Succeeded by: Dante Canlas

Personal details
- Education: De La Salle University (AB); University of the Philippines Diliman (M.Ec); Northwestern University (Ph.D. Ec.)
- Occupation: Professor
- Profession: Economist

Felipe Manguiat Medalla is a Filipino economist who has served as the governor of the Bangko Sentral ng Pilipinas, the central monetary authority of the Philippines, and the ex officio chair of the Anti-Money Laundering Council, the central anti-money laundering/counter-terrorism financing authority of the Philippines under the Marcos administration from 2022 to 2023. He previously served as the 9th Socio-Economic Planning Secretary and Director-General of the National Economic and Development Authority under President Joseph Estrada.

Medalla served as dean of the University of the Philippines School of Economics. In 1983, he earned his Ph.D. in economics from Northwestern University in Evanston, Illinois. His dissertation "Industrial Location in the Philippines" showed the consistence of a combination of Weberian and Loschian ideas in the location of industries in the Philippines.

Government offices
Preceded by Benjamin Diokno	Governor of the Bangko Sentral ng Pilipinas; 2022–2023	Succeeded by Eli M. Remolona, Jr.
Political offices
Preceded by Cielito Habito	Director-General of the National Economic and Development Authority; Concurrently Secretary of Socioeconomic Planning; 1998–2001	Succeeded by Dante Canlas
