= Jose Cuisia Jr. =

Filipino banker and diplomat (born 1944)

Jose L. Cuisia Jr. KGCR
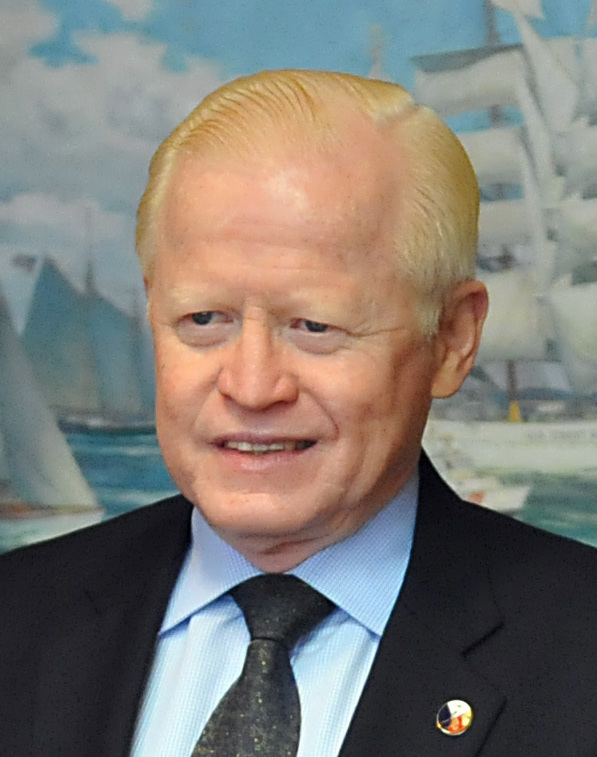
- Cuisia in 2013

Ambassador of the Philippines to the United States
- In office July 7, 2011 – June 30, 2016
- President: Benigno Aquino III
- Preceded by: Willy Gaa
- Succeeded by: Jose Manuel Romualdez

7th Governor of the Central Bank of the Philippines
- In office February 20, 1990 – July 2, 1993
- President: Corazon Aquino; Fidel V. Ramos
- Preceded by: Jose B. Fernandez Jr.
- Succeeded by: Gabriel C. Singson

Personal details
- Born: 16 July 1944 (age 82)
- Spouse: Maria Victoria Jose Cuisia
- Education: De La Salle University (AB-BS); University of Pennsylvania (MBA)
- Occupation: Banker

Jose Lampe Cuisia Jr. KGCR (born 16 July 1944) is a Filipino banker, business executive, and diplomat. He was the seventh Governor of the Central Bank of the Philippines, serving from 1990 to 1993, and formerly the Ambassador of the Republic of the Philippines to the United States of America. He is vice-chairman in the Philippine American Life and General Insurance Co., in which he had been CEO for a decade until its American owners, AIG, went bankrupt and had to sell out to Asian investors. He is also vice chairman of SM Prime Holdings. He is also a director of the Ayalas' Manila Water Co., in cement conglomerate Holcim Philippines, in call-center firm Integra Business Processing Solutions, in property firm ICCP Holdings, and in Beacon Property Ventures. Likewise, Cuisia is chairman of The Covenant Car Co.

Ambassador Cuisia is an alumnus of De La Salle University, where he graduated in 1967 with degrees in Bachelor of Arts in Social Science and Bachelor of Science in Commerce (magna cum laude). He also finished his Masters in Business Administration-Finance at The Wharton School, University of Pennsylvania in 1970 as a University Scholar.

== Awards and honors ==
- : The Order of the Knights of Rizal - Knight Grand Cross of Rizal, KGCR (2015).
