= Gregorio Licaros =

Filipino banker

4th Governor of the Central Bank of the Philippines
- In office January 10, 1970 – January 15, 1981
- President: Ferdinand Marcos
- Preceded by: Alfonso Calalang
- Succeeded by: Jaime C. Laya

Personal details
- Profession: Banker, politician

Gregorio Licaros was the fourth Governor of the Central Bank of the Philippines from 1970 to 1981.

He was from Meycauayan, Bulacan, and was married to Concepcion Blanco where they had two sons, Gregorio Jr. and Abelardo.
