= Anti–Money Laundering Council =

Philippine government agency

- AMLC Logo

Agency overview
- Formed: October 17, 2001
- Jurisdiction: Philippines
- Headquarters: Anti–Money Laundering Council, EDPC Building, BSP Complex, Malate, Manila, Philippines
- Annual budget: ₱333.102 million Php (2026)
- Agency executives: Eli Remolona, Chairman; Reynaldo A. Regalado, Member; Francis Edralin Lim, Member; Ronel U. Buenaventura, Executive Director
- Website: www.amlc.gov.ph

The Anti–Money Laundering Council (AMLC, locally [ˈam.lak] ahm-LAHK) is the agency of the government of the Philippines that is tasked to implement the provisions of Republic Act No. 9160, also known as the Anti–Money Laundering Act of 2001 (AMLA), as amended, and Republic Act No. 10168, also known as the Terrorism Financing Prevention and Suppression Act of 2012 (TFPSA).

It serves as the Philippines' central anti–money laundering/counter-terrorism financing (AML/CTF) authority. As such, it functions as the AML/CTF regulator and supervisor, financial intelligence unit, and primary law enforcement agency of the Philippines against money laundering and terrorist financing. While the Bangko Sentral ng Pilipinas (BSP) Governor is its ex-officio chairman, it is an altogether separate entity from the BSP.

The AMLC may refer to (1) the government agency or (2) the Council, which heads the said government agency.

== Mandate ==
The AMLC is mandated to implement the AMLA and TFPSA, in accordance with the following State policies:

=== AMLA ===
- To protect and preserve the integrity of the Philippine financial system, including the confidentiality of bank accounts.
- To ensure that the Philippines shall not be used as a money laundering site for the proceeds of any unlawful activity.
- To extend cooperation, consistent with Philippines’ foreign policy, in transnational investigations and prosecutions of persons involved in money laundering activities wherever committed.

=== TFPSA ===
- To protect life, liberty and property from acts of terrorism and to condemn terrorism and those who support and finance it; and to recognize it as inimical and dangerous to national security and the welfare of the people; and to make the financing of terrorism a crime against the Filipino people, against humanity and against the law of nations.
- To recognize and to adhere to international commitments to combat the financing of terrorism, specifically to the International Convention for the Suppression of the Financing of Terrorism, as well as other binding terrorism related resolutions of the United Nations Security Council, pursuant to Chapter 7 of the United Nations Charter.
- To reinforce the fight against terrorism by preventing and suppressing the commission of said offenses through freezing and forfeiture of property or funds while protecting human rights.

== The council ==
The council is composed of the governor of the Bangko Sentral ng Pilipinas (BSP) as chairman, and the commissioner of the Insurance Commission(Philippines) (IC) and the chairperson of the Securities and Exchange Commission (SEC) as members. It acts unanimously in the discharge of its functions.

== Historical composition ==
2001–2004:

- Rafael Buenaventura (BSP, July 1999– )
- Lilia R. Bautista (SEC, 2000 – August 2004)
- Eduardo T. Malinis (IC, April 1962 – )

2004:

- Rafael Carlos B. Buenaventura (BSP, July 1999 – July 2005)
- Fe B. Barin (SEC, Sep. 2004 – )
- Eduardo T. Malinis (IC, April 1962 – July 2004)

2004–2005:

- Amando Tetangco, Jr. (BSP, July 2005 – )
- Fe B. Barin (SEC, Sep. 2004 – )
- Benjamin S. Santos (IC, August 2004 – October 2005)

2005–2007:

- Amando M. Tetangco, Jr. (BSP, July 2005 – )
- Fe B. Barin (SEC, Sep. 2004 – )
- Evangeline C. Escobillo (IC, October 2005 – August 2007)

2007–2010:

- Amando M. Tetangco, Jr. (BSP, July 2005 – )
- Fe B. Barin (SEC, Sep. 2004 -)
- Eduardo T. Malinis (IC, August 2007 – February 2010)

2010:

- Amando M. Tetangco, Jr. (BSP, July 2005 – )
- Fe B. Barin (SEC, Sep. 2004 -)
- Santiago J. Ranada (IC, February 2010 – July 2010)

2011:

- Amando M. Tetangco, Jr. (BSP, July 2005 – July 2011, 2 July 2011 – )
- Fe B. Barin (SEC, September 2004 – March 2011)
- Emmanuel F. Dooc (IC, January 2011 – )

2011–2016:

- Amando M. Tetangco, Jr. (BSP, July 2005 – )
- Teresita J. Herbosa (SEC, March 2011 – )
- Emmanuel F. Dooc (IC, January 2011 – 16 November 2017)

2016–2017:

- Amando M. Tetangco, Jr. (BSP, July 2005 – 2 July 2017)
- Teresita J. Herbosa (SEC, March 2011 – )
- Dennis B. Funa [IC, 16 November 2016 – 23 December 2018 (Officer-in-Charge), 23 December 2016 – ]

2017–2018:

- Nestor Espenilla, Jr. (BSP, 2 July 2017 – )
- Teresita J. Herbosa [SEC, March 2011 – 11 March 2018, 11 March 2018 – 6 June 2018 (Hold-over)]
- Dennis B. Funa [IC, 16 November 2016 – 23 December 2018 (Officer-in-Charge), 23 December 2016 – ]

2017–2019:

- Nestor A. Espenilla, Jr. (BSP, 2 July 2017 – 23 February 2019)
- Emilio Aquino (SEC, 6 June 2018 – )
- Dennis B. Funa (IC, 23 December 2016 – )

2019–2022:

- Benjamin Diokno (BSP, 4 March 2019 – 29 June 2022)
- Emilio B. Aquino (SEC, 6 June 2018 – )
- Dennis B. Funa (IC, 23 December 2016 – )

2022-2023:

- Felipe Medalla (BSP, 30 June 2022 – )
- Emilio B. Aquino (SEC, 6 June 2018 – )
- Dennis B. Funa (IC, 23 December 2016 – 31 December 2022; Hold-over - 1 January 2023 - 29 March 2023)

2023:

- Felipe Medalla (BSP, 30 June 2022 – 29 June 2023)
- Emilio B. Aquino (SEC, 6 June 2018 – June 5, 2025)
- Reynaldo A. Regalado (IC, 29 March 2023 – )

Present:

- Eli M. Remolona, Jr. (BSP, 30 June 2023 – present)
- Francis Edralin Lim (SEC, 5 June 2025 – present)
- Reynaldo A. Regalado (IC, 29 March 2023 – present)

== Executive directors ==
Rule 6, Section 2 of the 2018 Implementing Rules and Regulations, in relation to Section 8 of Republic Act No. 9160, as amended, states that the executive director shall be the chief executive officer of the AMLC. The following are the past and present executive directors of the AMLC:

- (Ret.) Judge Pio C. Guerrero

November 2001 – May 2002

- Atty. Vicente S. Aquino

May 2002 – March 2013

- Atty. Julia C. Bacay-Abad

March 2013 – 31 January 2017

- Atty. Mel Georgie B. Racela

01 February 2017 – 10 August 2017 (as Officer-in-Charge); 18 August 2017 – 17 August 2022

- Atty. Matthew M. David

18 August 2022 – 24 March 2026

- Atty. Arnold T. Kabanlit

25 March 2026 - 13 April 2026 (as Officer-in-Charge)

- Atty. Ronel U. Buenaventura

14 March 2026 - present

== Frenchie Mae Cumpio ==
In October 2025, the Court of Appeals reversed the forfeiture of ₱557,360 that the AMLC had seized from journalist Frenchie Mae Cumpio and church worker Marielle Domequil. The court reprimanded the AMLC for the "hasty labeling" of Cumpio and Domequil as terrorists. The Court of Appeals decision stated,

The Court cannot countenance the hasty labeling of human rights advocates as terrorists and the speedy confiscation of their funds and property in the name of national security. Measures to counter terrorism must not be done without due process, and at the expense of individuals, groups, and civil society organizations that are engaged in the promotion and defense of human rights.... To permit the forfeiture of property and funds without strict observance of the guidelines… would erode the public's trust in the state's capacity to manage threats to national security and address the causes of terrorism.
