= Poleteismo =

Installation art piece

Poleteismo was an installation art project by Filipino artist and curator Mideo Cruz. Previously exhibited starting in 2002 at the Ateneo de Manila, the UP Vargas Museum, among other venues, without much controversy, its 2011 iteration, exhibited at the Cultural Center of the Philippines (CCP), became the subject of a public outcry from the Philippines' overwhelmingly Christian population. The CCP display of the installation piece was a part of Kulô (Boiling), a group exhibition organized by the fine arts alumni of the University of Santo Tomas (UST) to commemorate both the university's 400th anniversary and the 150th anniversary of José Rizal's birth.

== Description ==
The installation combined Catholic religious symbols, pop culture images, political images, and phallic objects.

Taking inspiration from his childhood where he would see on their family house's walls family pictures, framed certificates, and medals, and similarly the neighbors' houses' walls displaying posters, calendars, pictures of politicians and celebrities, etc. as adornments, Cruz recreated in the same aesthetic manner the idea behind the worship of such images of identification and devotion. The work was composed of relics the artist had collected since high school, items that he grew up with as well as objects that reflect society and the nation. Cruz said that the 2011 "uproar (that was) created may be the unconscious denial of seeing ourselves truthfully in the mirror."

In the 2011 iteration of Poleteismo, one could literally see their own reflection on the convex mirror placed at the center of the Cross relic, as well as the wall collage behind them, which, according to the artist, was another kind of reflection.

== Impact ==
One piece in the 2011 installation, as Cruz's version of the Crucifixion of Jesus, got the most ire for the artist's placement of a wooden representation of a human male genital organ on the forehead of a representative face of Jesus. Religious organizations and individuals, including former First Lady Imelda Romualdez Marcos, criticized the installation, citing Cruz's Crucifixion imagery as an insult to the Crucifix symbol or to the Crucifixion as a whole. Catholic bishops and some Catholic conservatives described the work as blasphemous. Another piece in the installation depicted Jesus Christ as a figurine with Mickey Mouse's ears.

An individual vandalized Cruz's art project and attempted to set fire to it, death threats were communicated to both the artist and members of the CCP board, and officials of the CCP were summoned to a Senate hearing to explain why they mounted the exhibit. The CCP's board later decided to take down the piece due to the "increasing number of threats to persons and property", after which decision one board member resigned. Cruz begged off from attending the Senate hearing, writing that he was abiding by the advice of colleagues to not attend, as the process might simply feed his "self-serving impulse to defend my work or my person to each query, insult or threat being hurled at me." Meanwhile, there were offers of novenas for Cruz, and the CCP was "exorcised" by devout Catholics.

In August 2011, Cruz and ten CCP officials faced criminal complaints accusing them of violating the Revised Penal Code's Article 201 on obscene exhibitions and indecent shows. The ten CCP officials—namely Emily Abrera, Raul Sunico, Florangel Rosario-Braid, Jaime Laya, Isabel Caro Wilson, Zenaida Tantoco, Maria Cristina Turalba, Antonio Yap, Carolyn Espiritu, and Karen Ocampo Flores—also faced administrative complaints alleging their violation of the Code of Conduct and Ethical Standard for Public Officials and Employees (Republic Act 6713). Abrera and Sunico were also charged with grave misconduct and conduct unbecoming of a public officer. In March 2013, Ombudsman Conchita Carpio-Morales cleared Cruz and the ten officials of any wrongdoing and ruled that Poleteismo was not obscene.

== Critical reception ==
=== Criticism ===
Novelist F. Sionil Jose lambasted Cruz's installation in his column in The Philippine Star with a piece titled "The CCP Jesus Christ exhibit: It ain't art". He echoed this opinion in the Senate hearing that transpired, saying the artwork was an attempt by an "immature" and "juvenile" artist to express his views. "(Not) all propaganda is art," he added.

Visual artist Abdulmari Asia Imao, who was also present during the hearing, apologetically agreed with Jose. In an interview with the Philippine Daily Inquirer, he said that, although a Muslim, he was offended by Cruz's decision to put a penis image on the forehead of the Sacred Heart of Jesus image. "Mabigat… (It's quite grave)," he added.

The Catholic Bishops' Conference of the Philippines (CBCP) reminded Cruz how freedom of expression is not absolute. "Human freedom is a gift of God and has corresponding responsibilities," said CBCP vice president and Cebu Archbishop José S. Palma, while noting that the Conference was condemning Cruz's artwork, not Cruz. UST's vice rector, Rev. Pablo Tiong, agreed with Archbishop Palma, and informed the panel that the exhibition was not a project of the university and emphasized the fact that Cruz was once a student of the institution but did not earn a degree there.

=== Defense ===
In answer to Sionil Jose's essay and Senate hearing testimony, critic Isagani R. Cruz (no relation to the artist) defended the artist's work through a write-up titled "Is Poleteismo Art?" in his own Philippine Star column, offering three positive readings. First, that the artist is expressing his anger at representations of Jesus, such as the Crucifix, as a betrayal of the real Jesus. Second, that the artist is presenting sex (represented by the human sex organ) and religion as necessary to each other, given that the human genital organ is used for removing waste (crucial to a person's life) and for "going and multiplying". Finally, for his third reading, which expands his first reading with the support of his second, Cruz wrote: "Following 'biblical hermeneutics' (a way of reading religious symbols from the point of view of the reader or audience), we could say that Poleteismo is really about us. We who are looking at the work read our own meanings into the male organ and into the face of Jesus. It is we that have ridiculed the face of Jesus, with our preoccupation with the male organ. . . . Our obsession with the RH bill, divorce, same-sex marriage, and other issues that are somehow related to sexual intercourse is a betrayal of the Christian message, which has to do with feeding the hungry, visiting the sick and imprisoned, and helping the poor. By focusing our energies on the male genital organ, we . . . have been unfaithful to Jesus, who was extremely tolerant of sex offenders but was very angry at people that judged or hated other people."

Echoing critic Cruz's second reading, the artist himself had stated that "Anything that is part of our body is not obscene." More to the point, the artist had said that the penis image is "symbolic of patriarchy, a symbol of power. There are those who worship power, who put their faith in men who wield power even if the power is used against women, or against the whole of society. The fight for sexual and gender equality continues, doesn't it? But the balance continues to be tipped in favor of the phallus. Is this good or bad? You decide."

Fiction writer Butch Dalisay, in his own Philippine Star column and also in answer to Sionil Jose's judgment of the artist, wrote: "Cruz's maturity is beside the point. It's our maturity as a critically thinking people that's on the line here. What seems to me more immature is banning movies, books, and other works of art—especially if you have the power—because you don't like them, because you think they're bad or you can do better, because they run counter to your own beliefs and values, or because they point an annoying, accusing finger at you. (I'll agree that badly written books have no right to get published, but once published, it would be silly to ban them.)"

Meanwhile, the Center for Media Freedom & Responsibility (CMFR), also in defense of the artist's work, blamed the media for the conservative public's negative response to the artwork, specially citing that it was the result of a deliberate sensationalist take by ABS-CBN 2's investigative program XXX. The CMFR chastised XXX for falsely linking Cruz's installation art piece to the divisive debate then going on around what was then still the reproductive health (RH) bill. In its chastisement, CMFR reported that the program did not mention the larger exhibit and described Cruz's work as the artist's statement on the pending bill that the Church was strongly opposing. CMFR cited a BusinessWorld report where Cruz denied ever mentioning the RH bill in his interview with XXX. "It has since become clear that the program took the tack it took for its controversial value," CMFR wrote, describing how the XXX episode on the issue began with footage of anti- and pro-RH advocates. The report's lead included the line, "Eksklusibo: Art exhibit sa CCP minatyagan ng XXX. Mga kontrobersyal na art works patungkol sa RH bill. Pambabastos na raw at ‘di na for art’s sake. (Exclusive: Art exhibit at the CCP monitored by XXX. Controversial art works about the RH bill. Disrespectful, some say, and no longer for art's sake)." Thus, according to the CMFR, XXX provoked the outrage over Cruz's work, which, in addition to the artist's "being threatened, insulted and ridiculed by various conservative groups and individuals," resulted in Cruz being accused of violating the country's obscenity laws. This barrage led to a need for CCP to put out a disclaimer spelling out what the piece was actually about, "idolatry and the deconstruction of neo-deities (in the Philippines)". Additionally, ABS-CBN published the artist's address, which made the artist fear the possible arrival of a mob in front of his yard.

The Concerned Artists of the Philippines (CAP), in light of the hearing the Philippine Senate decided to hold, issued a statement urging the senators to uphold the Freedom of Expression article in the 1987 Constitution. The CAP also expressed alarm over President Benigno Aquino III's reported call to the CCP Board and his public "there is no freedom that is absolute" statement.

Similarly, artist Leonilo Doloricon, a former dean of the UP at Diliman College of Fine Arts, disagreed with the notion that free expression is "a gift of the state to the people out of compassion". "(Our present) right to free expression is the result of the people's struggle against the Marcos dictatorship," he said, explaining that the 1986 fall of the dictatorship led the new government under President Cory Aquino to form a Constitutional Assembly that would frame a new constitution that would replace the 1973 Constitution to which the political mandate of Marcos belonged. It was under the new 1987 constitution, says Doloricon, that Article 4, section 4, on freedom of speech, expression, and the press, came to pass. "If this is the case," he asked, "why are we still pressing for the right to free expression vis-a-vis the closure of the Kulo exhibit, and to whom are we addressing the issue? Are we addressing the issue to the board of trustees of the CCP, to the Church people, or to the Aquino government who were also believed to be behind this closure?”

Raul Pangalangan, dean of the University of the Philippines College of Law and a columnist of the Philippine Daily Inquirer, said in an interview with Bulatlat that a lot of "fallacies" were peddled by Cruz's conservative critics, among which was that Poleteismo is free to be displayed in a private gallery but not at the CCP, which is a state instrumentality. Pagdanganan argued that, true, a "private gallery is completely free to judge art according to its aesthetic biases. But a publicly-funded gallery is bound by a document called the Philippine Constitution, which requires it to respect 'freedom of speech and of expression' (Article III, Sec. 4 of the Philippine Constitution) and 'foster … a Filipino national culture … in a climate of free artistic and intellectual expression' (Article XIV, Sec. 14). By shutting down Kulô, the government is reduced to being the henchman of the neighborhood thug." In an interview with SunStar, he said that the courts have already ruled in favor of free speech in two cases of people offending religious sensibilities.

Artist, author and curator Imelda Cajipe-Endaya said the controversy was not about an artwork being prurient or obscene but more about blasphemy and sacrilege. She told Cruz himself in a forum that she herself was offended by the artwork, but that she didn't think that the CPP should have closed the exhibit. Cajipe-Endaya previously wrote an essay titled "Trying to understand why art can offend, and why artists should continue to be free".

== See also ==
- Carlos Celdran
