= Jose B. Fernandez Jr. =

José B. Fernández Jr.

6th Governor of the Central Bank of the Philippines
- In office January 19, 1984 – February 19, 1990
- President: Ferdinand Marcos; Corazon Aquino
- Preceded by: Jaime C. Laya
- Succeeded by: José L. Cuisia Jr.

Personal details
- Born: September 22, 1923
- Died: June 19, 1994 (aged 70)
- Profession: Banker

José Bartolome Fernández Jr. (22 September 1923 – 19 June 1994) was the sixth Governor of Central Bank of the Philippines. Under his term, he served two Philippine presidents and was the governor under one turbulent event, the People Power Revolution of 1986.
