= Dante Canlas =

Filipino economist

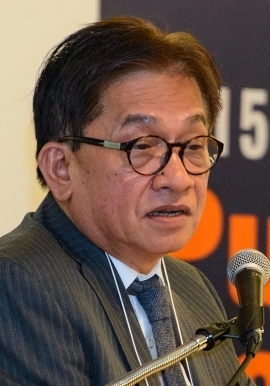
- Dr. Canlas speaking at a PIDS conference in September 2015

10th Director-General of the National Economic and Development Authority Concurrently Secretary of Socioeconomic Planning
- In office January 20, 2001 – December 13, 2002
- President: Gloria Macapagal Arroyo
- Preceded by: Felipe Medalla
- Succeeded by: Romulo Neri

Personal details
- Education: University of the Philippines Diliman (AB, MA, PhD)
- Occupation: Professor
- Profession: Economist

Dante Bondoc Canlas is a Filipino economist and a professor at the UP School of Economics at the University of the Philippines Diliman. He served as Socio-Economic Planning Secretary and concurrently Director-General of the National Economic and Development Authority from 2001 to 2002 under President Gloria Macapagal Arroyo. Dr. Canlas was also the Executive Director of the Asian Development Bank (ADB) for Kazakhstan, Maldives, Marshall Islands, Mongolia, Pakistan, and the Philippines from 2003 to 2004.

He earned his B.S. in mathematics, M.A. and Ph.D. in economics from the University of the Philippines Diliman, where he was a member of Upsilon Sigma Phi. He completed his dissertation "Marital Fertility and Working Wives in the Philippines: An Economic Analysis" in 1978. He was Visiting Professor at Northern Illinois University in De Kalb, Illinois and Research Fellow at the prestigious Princeton University in New Jersey.

Preceded by Felipe Medalla	Director-General of the National Economic and Development Authority; 2001 – 2002	Succeeded by Romulo Neri
