= Eli Remolona =

Filipino economist and central bank governor

Eli Remolona Jr.
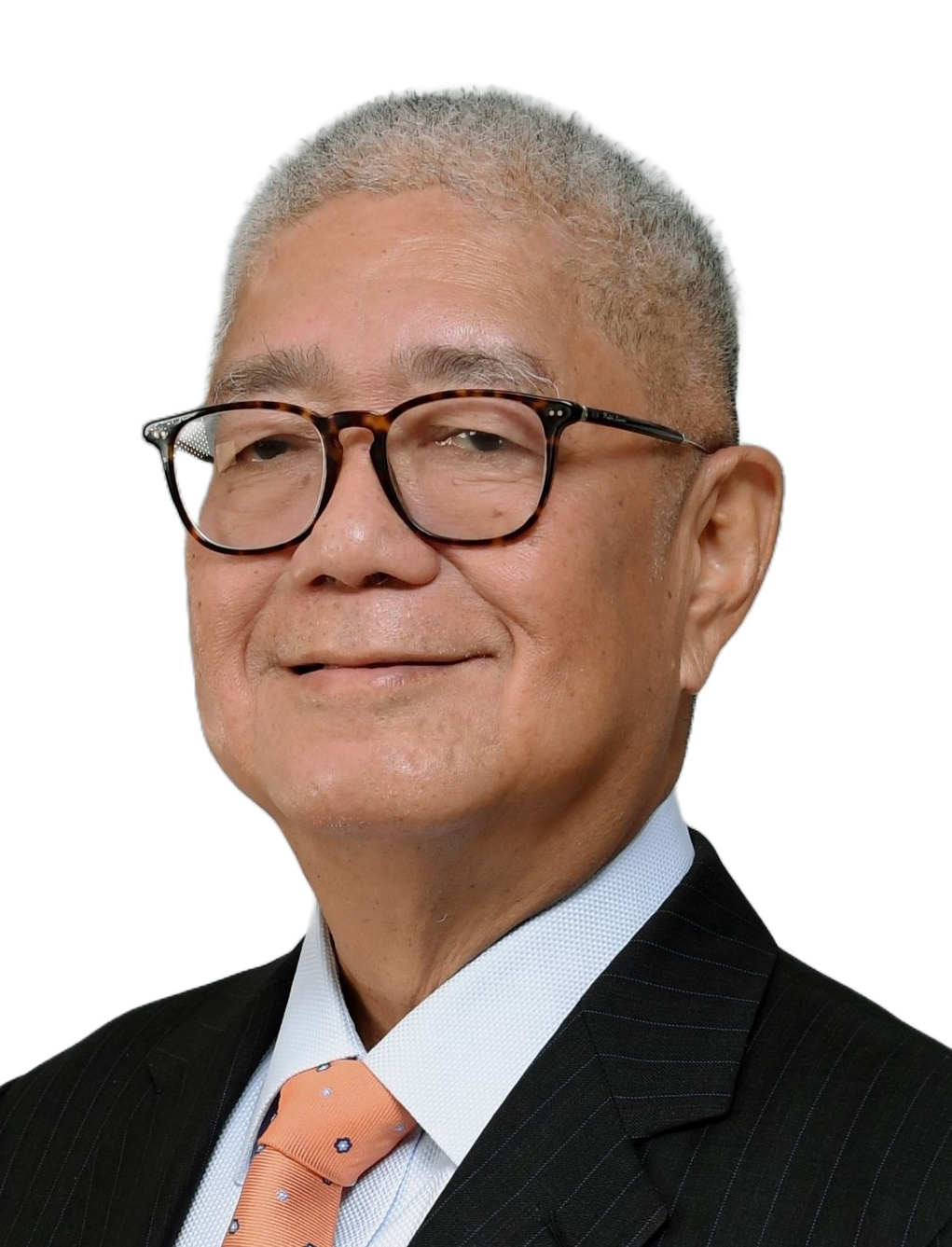
- Official portrait, 2023

7th Governor of the Bangko Sentral ng Pilipinas
- Incumbent
- Assumed office July 3, 2023
- President: Bongbong Marcos
- Deputy: Francisco G. Dakila Jr. Eduardo G. Bobier; Chuchi G. Fonacier; Mamerto Tangonan; Bernadette Romulo-Puyat
- Preceded by: Felipe Medalla

Member of the Monetary Board of the Bangko Sentral ng Pilipinas

Personal details
- Born: 1952 (age 73–74)
- Education: Ateneo de Manila University (AB); Stanford University (Ph.D. Ec.)
- Occupation: Professor
- Profession: Economist

Eli Mendiola Remolona Jr. (born 1952) is a Filipino economist serving as the governor of the Bangko Sentral ng Pilipinas (BSP), the central monetary authority of the Philippines, and the ex officio chairman of the Anti-Money Laundering Council, the central anti-money laundering/counter-terrorism financing authority of the Philippines, under the Bongbong Marcos administration since July 3, 2023.

He previously worked for 14 years at the Federal Reserve Bank of New York and for 19 years at the Bank for International Settlements (BIS), where he was regional head for Asia and the Pacific from 2008 to 2018. He was an editor of the BIS Quarterly Review and was an associate editor for finance of the International Journal of Central Banking, as of 2005.

In addition, he has taught at Williams College, Columbia University, New York University, the University of the Philippines School of Economics, and the Asia School of Business.

== Selected works ==
Two of his most cited co-authored articles according to his Scopus author profile are:

- Amstad, Marlene; Remolona, Eli M.; Shek, Jimmy. (September 2016). "How do global investors differentiate between sovereign risks? The new normal versus the old". Journal of International Money and Finance. 66: 32–48. doi: 10.1016/j.jimonfin.2015.12.006. ScienceDirect. Also published as BIS Working Papers, no 541.
- Don, Kim H.; Loretan, Mico; Remolona, Eli M. (June 2010). "Contagion and risk premia in the amplification of crisis: Evidence from Asian names in the global CDS market". Journal of Asian Economics. 21 (3): 314–326. doi: 10.1016/j.asieco.2009.07.010. ScienceDirect.

Government offices
Preceded by Felipe Medalla	Governor of the Bangko Sentral ng Pilipinas; 2023–present	Incumbent
Order of precedence
Preceded by Assistant Secretaries of Departments, Directors-General and Chiefs of Mission I and II of the Department of Foreign Affairs	Order of Precedence of the Philippines as Governor of the Bangko Sentral ng Pilipinas	Succeeded by Foreign Charges d’Affaires de missi, Foreign Chargé d'Affaires ad interim
