= Baluarte de San Diego =

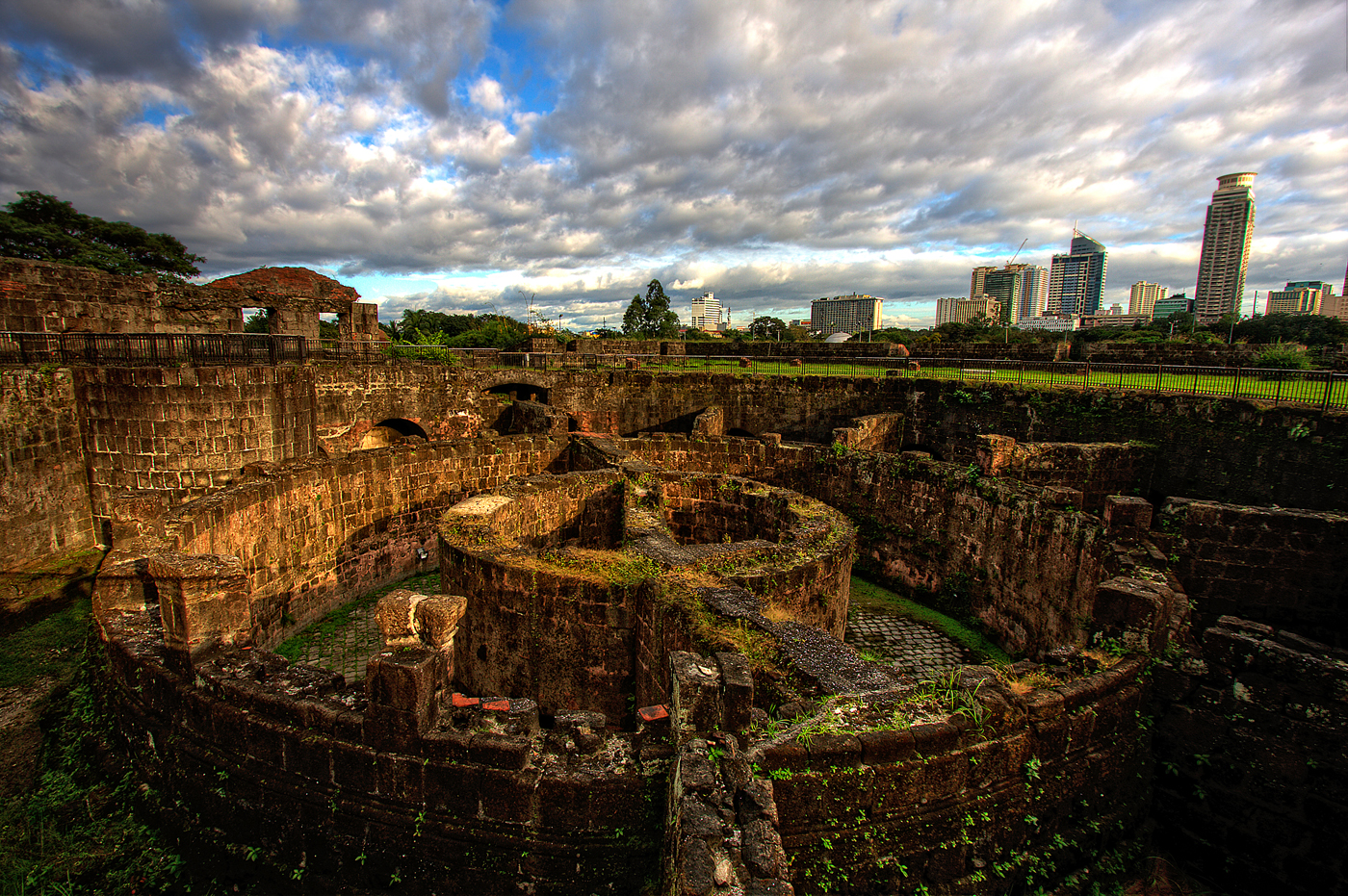
- Baluarte de San Diego in Intramuros
- Interactive map of the Baluarte de San Diego area
- Former names: Fort Nuestra Señora de Guia

General information
- Type: Fortification
- Architectural style: Bastioned fort
- Location: Santa Lucia corner Muralla Streets, Intramuros, Manila, Philippines
- Coordinates: 14°35′07″N 120°58′32″E
- Construction started: 1586
- Completed: 1587
- Renovated: 1979–1992
- Owner: Intramuros Administration

Technical details
- Structural system: Masonry

Design and construction
- Architects: Fr. Antonio Sedeño, SJ

The Baluarte de San Diego is a bastion in Intramuros, part of the Spanish colonial fortification in the walled city of Manila in the Philippines.

== History ==
The existence of the fort started from Governor General Gómez Pérez Dasmariñas who integrated an older fort with cortina or curtain walls, built from 1591 to 1594. The bastion is a protruding structure with facing flanks built along the cortina. The purpose of its projection was to ensure a clearer view of the cortina for the artillery - in order for them to prepare against invaders. The bastion has two parts; face (which projected outward) and flanks (connecting the face and the cortina, or the curtain wall). Several developments were added in the course of time such as addition of semi-circular structures at the base called orillons or little ears making the bastion resemble an ace-of-spades shape.

Baluarte de San Diego was an ace-of-spades bastion built on the southwestern corner of Intramuros. It underwent several alterations. In 1609, a writing from Antonio de Morga states that the structure was only a tower within a much larger construction of the Fort Nuestra Señora de Guia. Jesuit priest Antonio Sedeño was the commissioned parish priest responsible for the construction of the Fort Nuestra Señora de Guia. Some of the amenities and facilities included within the fort were courtyard, cistern tank (water supply tank), lodging quarters, and workshops. However, the construction of the fort was always interrupted due to arising circumstances, thus, was not finished.

== Archaeological excavation ==
The archaeological excavation of Bastion de San Diego was conducted by the Intramuros Administration and the National Museum from 1979 up to December 1982. Dog-leash method was used due to the sandy soil condition of the site. This method involved measuring the location of artifacts and their distances from a single control point, and orienting their location toward a datum point.

Below were the following facts established:

1. The unexcavated portion below the exposed level of the outer circular structure and the casements on its street level may have been part of the original Vera-Sedeño tower, with possible improvements introduced during Manrique de Lara's time.
2. The construction of the second and first circular structures is not contemporaneous with the older structure, being differentiated from the third circle by its finish and mode of construction.
3. The terra-cotta finish of the masonry of the second and first circles appears to have been applied for waterproofing.
4. Brick tiles were introduced in the flooring of the innermost circle so that it may act as filter from underground impurities.
5. No trace was left of the circular wall that had supposedly surrounded the patio of Vera's time. The present inner circular structures have floor elevations that fall at 3.65 metres (12.0 ft) below the present street level. The latter coincides with the flooring of the third outer circle.

== Excavated structures ==
Bastion de San Diego is composed of three concentric structures. The first circle has an inner diameter of 8 metres (26 ft) and a wall thickness of 1.41 metres (4.6 ft). It lies 3.65 metres (12.0 ft) below the present street level of Muralla Street on the southern section. It has a total height of 5.75 metres (18.9 ft). Also, its inner and outer sides were plastered in pink terra cotta. The second circle has a diameter of 21 metres (69 ft) with a wall thickness of 0.90 metres (3.0 ft). Its total height is 6.15 metres (20.2 ft). The interior surface of the second circle was in terra-cotta finish. The flooring of both circles were made of brick tiles. The third circle has a height of 8.55 metres (28.1 ft) with a diameter of 32 metres (105 ft) and a wall thickness of 3 metres (9.8 ft). It is composed of 11 chambers. Although it is constructed with adobe walls, it has no direct relation to the first 2 circles. It was constructed earlier than the remaining circles.

== Statue of Liberty ==
As early as January 1945, there were already news of a campaign that would help erect a Statue of Liberty replica in the Philippines. The said monument was supposed to be sponsored by The Chicago Daily Times whose goal was "to commemorate one of the great epics in the struggle for human freedom–the liberation of the Philippines."

Fast forward to 1950, the Boy Scouts of America was celebrating its 40th anniversary. Jack P. Whitaker, then Scout Commissioner of the Kansas City Area Council, had earlier suggested the creation and distribution of several Statue of Liberty replicas to all American states and territories, including the Philippines.

In the Philippines, several places were suggested as the site where the eight-foot bronze replica would be erected. The task of choosing the perfect site was delegated to the National Urban Planning Commission, and among those it considered were "Engineer Island, atop the proposed reviewing stand on the Rizal Park, and on the center island rotunda between the Old Legislative Building and Manila City Hall."

In the end, the Boy Scouts of the Philippines (BSP) erected the statue on the fort. As the icon of the United States, the replica of Lady Liberty would survive several attacks by student protesters in the 1960s. It remained standing until the early 1970s, when the BSP decided to transfer it to the Scout Reservation in Mt. Makiling which would serve as the statue's home for two decades or so.

In a 2002 article published by the Philippine Star, then BSP PR head Nixon Canlapan revealed that the Statue of Liberty was eventually moved and stored at the BSP headquarters on Concepcion Street (now Natividad Almeda-Lopez) in Ermita, Manila.

== Present condition ==
Gardens and pergolas were added to make the structure more appealing to the visitors and more suitable for special events. The area is managed by the Intramuros Administration, an attached agency of the Department of Tourism.

=== Marker from the Intramuros Administration ===
Baluarte de San Diego
DESIGNED AND BUILT BY JESUIT PRIEST ANTONIO SEDEÑO FROM 1586 TO 1587, IT IS ONE OF THE OLDEST STONE FORTIFICATIONS IN INTRAMUROS. BEGAN AS A CIRCULAR FORT CALLED NUESTRA SEÑORA DE GUIA. RENOVATED IN 1593 TO JOIN THE WALLS OF THE CITY. FORT FELL IN DISREPAIR AND IN 1614, CONSTRUCTION BEGAN FOR A NEW BALUARTE WHICH WAS COMPLETED BETWEEN 1653 AND 1663. RESEMBLING AN ACE OF SPADES, IT HOUSED A FOUNDRY DURING THE 18TH CENTURY.

THE BALUARTE WAS BREACHED BY BRITISH FORCES WITH CANNON FIRE IN 1762. RESTORED AND STRENGTHENED AFTER THE BRITISH OCCUPATION BUT WAS DAMAGED DURING THE 1863 EARTHQUAKE. IT WAS DESTROYED DURING THE BATTLE OF MANILA IN 1945. RESTORATION BEGAN IN 1979 AND WAS COMPLETED IN 1992.
