= Miguel Cuaderno Sr. =

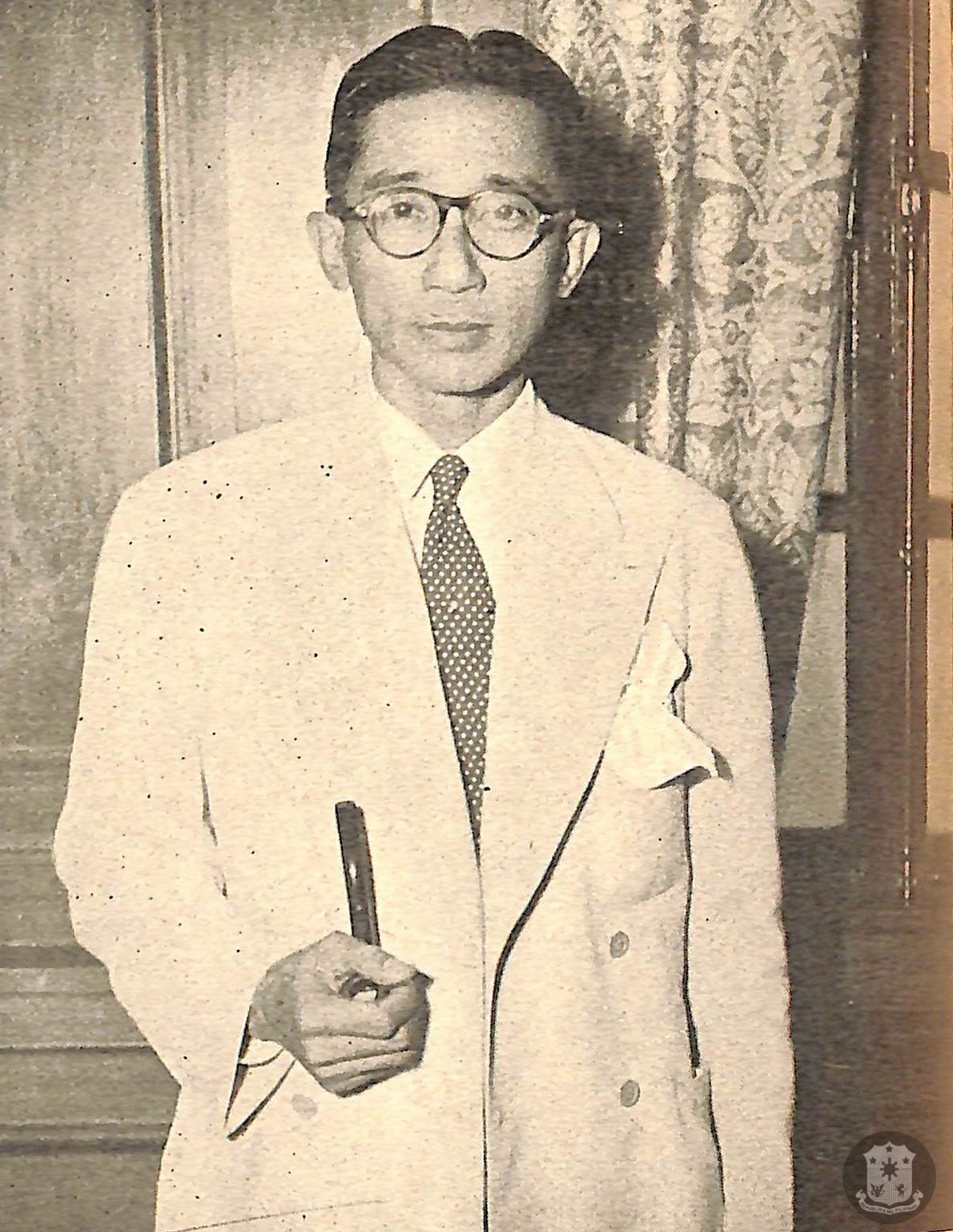
- Photograph from the Blue Book: First Anniversary of the Republic of the Philippines, published 1947

1st Governor of the Central Bank of the Philippines
- In office January 3, 1949 – December 31, 1960
- President: Elpidio Quirino; Ramon Magsaysay; Carlos P. Garcia
- Preceded by: Position established
- Succeeded by: Andres Castillo

17th Finance Secretary of the Philippines
- In office November 25, 1946 – January 2, 1949
- President: Manuel Roxas; Elpidio Quirino
- Preceded by: Elpidio Quirino
- Succeeded by: Jaime Hernandez

Personal details
- Born: Miguel Pascual Cuaderno; December 12, 1890 Manila, Captaincy General of the Philippines
- Died: January 14, 1975 (aged 84) Philippines
- Profession: Banker, politician

Miguel Pascual Cuaderno Sr. (December 12, 1890 – January 14, 1975) was the Finance Secretary of the Philippines under Manuel Roxas from November 25, 1946 to January 2, 1949 and the first Governor of the Central Bank of the Philippines from 1949 to 1960.

== Biography ==
Don Miguel was born in Manila on December 12, 1890. His parents were Protacio Cuaderno of Manila and Francisca Rey Hipolito Pascual of Balanga. He grew up in the ancestral home of the Pascuals in Talisay, Balanga. Cuaderno finished his Commerce course from the Liceo de Manila, and his Law degree from the Philippine Law School as valedictorian. He passed the Bar examinations in 1919 as second placer. While employed as professional lecturer of Law at the Philippine Law School and lecturer in banking and finance at the Far Eastern University and University of the East (1922-1937), he also undertook special studies in monetary theory and central banking in the United States and England.

Cuaderno was a member of the Pan Xenia Fraternity.

=== Early career ===
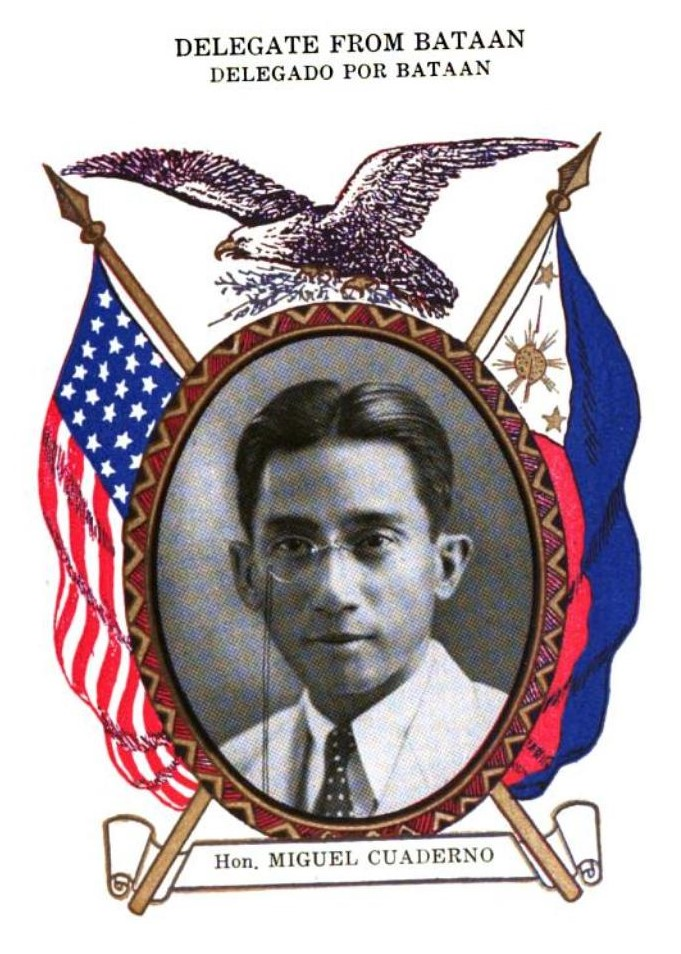
Cuaderno as a delegate to the Philippine Constitutional Convention, published by Benipayo Press (c. 1935)

Cuaderno formerly served as the general manager of the Philippine National Bank. During his time in the PNB beginning in 1926, Cuaderno handled the bank's legal cases following the financial crisis in the 1920s. During the 1930s, he, along with Miguel Unson and Rafael Corpus, was one of the advocates of establishing a central bank. In their book Economic Problems of the Philippines (1934), Cuaderno and Unson referenced the failure of the Philippine currency system in 1920 and 1921 stating that it failed to provide enough money. They also further reiterated the need for "an independent system" to perform "adequate management of currency."

In 1934, he became a member of the Committee of “Seven Wise Men” which included the father and chairman of the Constitution Filemon Sotto, Norberto Romualdez, Manuel Roxas, Vicente Singson Encarnacion, Manuel Briones and Conrado Benitez who drafted the 1935 Philippine Constitution. He was among the members of the Philippine delegation that traveled to the United States to submit the constitution to President Franklin D. Roosevelt for certification under the provisions of the Philippine Independence Act. While in the US, he was admitted to the practice of Law in Washington, D.C. (1935).

He was made a member of the board, then acting general manager and later executive vice president of the Philippine National Bank until 1936. Thereafter, he served as chairman of the board of directors of the International Stock Exchange until 1938. Consequently, he served as first president of the Philippine Bank of Commerce. From June 1946 until December 1948, he served as Secretary of Finance under President Manuel A. Roxas. He was also a member of the National Economic Council (1946-1960) and chairman of the Economic Commission for Asia and the Far East (ECAFE) starting in 1948.

=== Governor of the Philippine Central Bank ===
It was President Elpidio Quirino (1948-1953) who appointed Cuaderno as first governor of the Central Bank of the Philippines. He served for 12 years (1948-1959) under three presidents—Quirino, Ramon Magsaysay (1953-1957) and Carlos P. Garcia (1957-1961). In 1953, he was appointed by the Secretary-General of the United Nations as member of a committee which drew up plans for the establishment of a special fund for the financing of economic development of underdeveloped countries (SUNFED). In 1957, he was elected chairman of the Board of Governors of the International Monetary Fund, International Bank for Reconstruction and Development, and the International Finance Corporation. Upon his suggestion, businessman Eugenio Lopez Sr. bought Meralco from an American multinational corporation.

As governor of the central bank, Cuaderno was disappointed with the weak import controls in the Philippines and wrote to President Quirino three times, suggesting strict enforcement of the 1948 import control law. He argued in an interview by the Manila Chronicle that controls help local producers. During the presidency of Ramon Magsaysay, Cuaderno stressed the importance of keeping the foreign exchange policy stable, highlighting the negative impacts of currency devaluation. In his speech on March 6, 1954 at the annual convention of the Philippine Coconut Planters Association, he argued that the Philippine economy was thriving, as shown by the growth in copra exports. He explained that devaluation would raise prices of essential imports and harm the economy by increasing costs of machinery and materials.

=== Later years ===
On May 1, 1970, he was engaged by the Asian Development Center to draft an agreement among eight Asian countries for the organization of the Asian Payment Union which made possible the use in said countries of their respective national currencies, thereby promoting trade among them. In 1971, he was elected as member of the 1971 Constitutional Convention. Don Miguel Cuaderno was married to Mercedes Martin. He had nine children. He died on January 14, 1975 due to a heart attack.
