= Governor of the Bangko Sentral ng Pilipinas =

Role in the Philippines central bank

- Tagapangasiwa ng Bangko Sentral ng Pilipinas
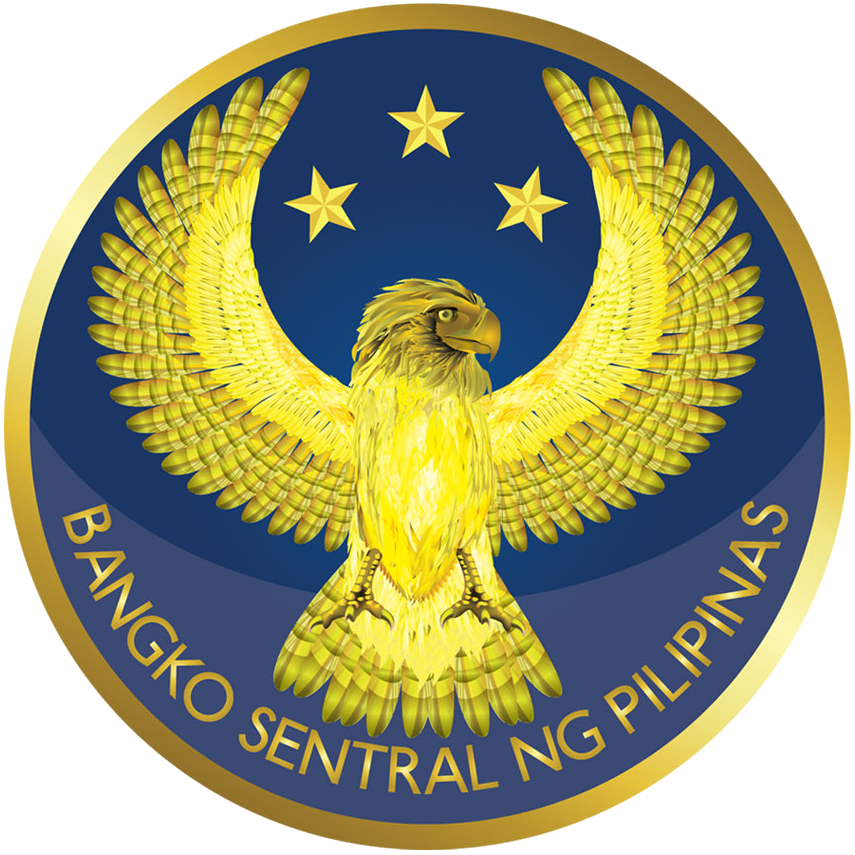
- Official Bangko Sentral seal

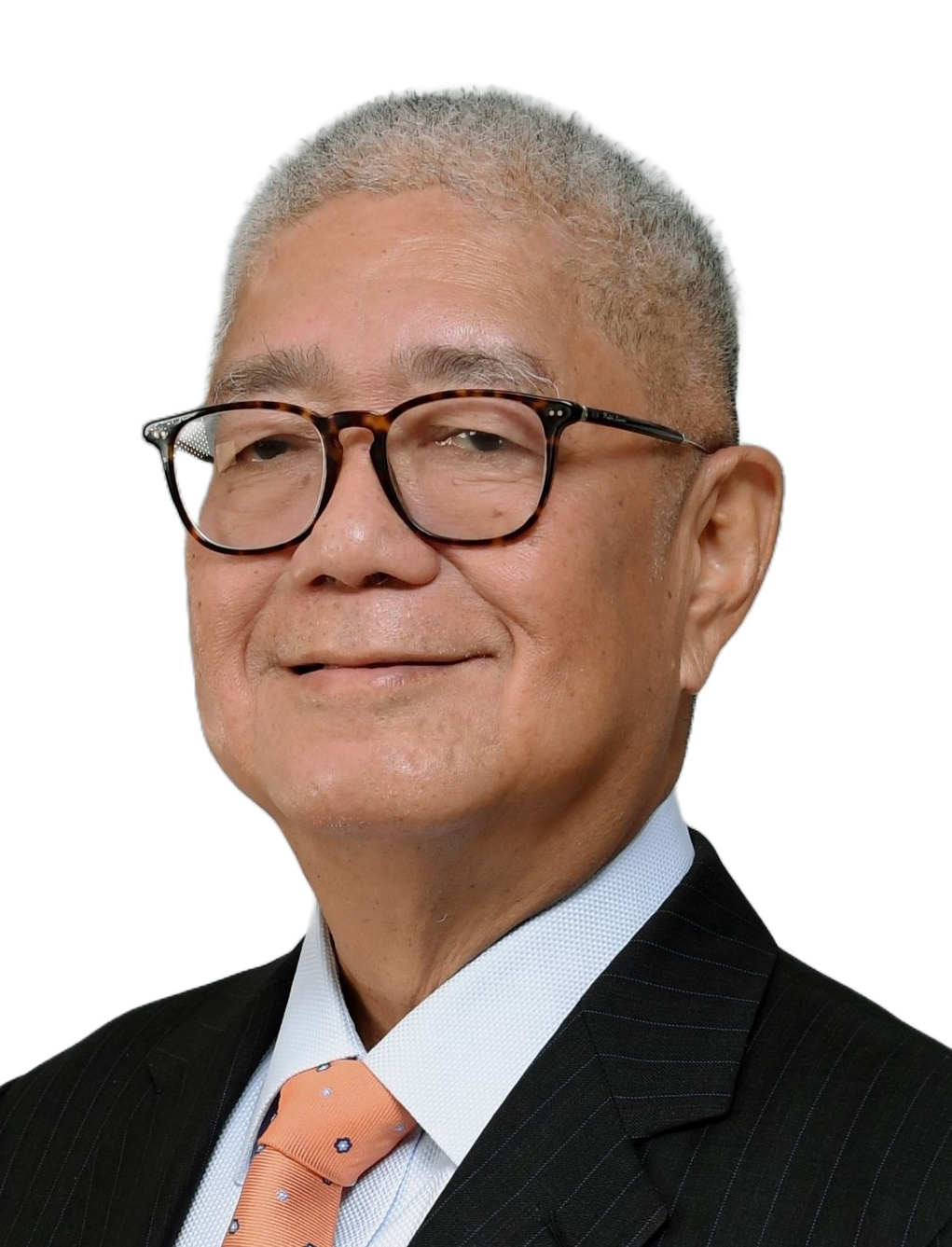
- Incumbent; Eli Remolona since July 3, 2023
- Member of: The Monetary Board; Anti-Money Laundering Council
- Seat: BSP Complex, Roxas Boulevard, Manila, Philippines
- Appointer: The president (Note: Though the New Central Banking Act said that the Governor of the Bangko Sentral ng Pilipinas needs confirmation from the Commission on Appointments, both the Supreme Court and Malacañang stated that the officials subjected to CA confirmation does not include the BSP Governor.)
- Term length: Six years renewable once
- Constituting instrument: The BSP Charter; The New Central Bank Act (RA11211 )
- Inaugural holder: Miguel Cuaderno Sr.
- Formation: January 3, 1949
- Website: bsp.gov.ph

The governor of the Bangko Sentral ng Pilipinas/Central Bank of the Philippines (Filipino: Tagapangasiwa ng Bangko Sentral ng Pilipinas or simply Tagapangasiwa ng Bangko Sentral (Note: Seen on Philippine banknotes since the release of Pilipino Series in 1969.)) is the chief executive officer of the Bangko Sentral ng Pilipinas, the Philippines' central bank.

On June 23, 2023, President Bongbong Marcos appointed Eli Remolona as the fourteenth governor of the Bangko Sentral ng Pilipinas, replacing Felipe Medalla. Medalla had shared a six-year term with Benjamin Diokno, who was subsequently appointed as Secretary of Finance. and Nestor Espenilla, Jr., who died while in office.

== Roles with other agencies ==
He also serves as the chairman and principal representative of the Monetary Board; chairman of the Anti–Money Laundering Council and Philippine International Convention Center; vice-chairman of the Governing Council of Agriculture Credit Policy Council; member of the Capital Market Development Council, Export Development Council, PhilExport board of trustees, and Philippine Export-Import Credit Agency; and director of Philippine Deposit Insurance Corporation, National Development Council, and National Home Mortgage Finance Corporation.

== Powers and duties ==
His powers and duties as the chief executive officer of the Bangko Sentral shall be to:

1. Prepare the agenda for the meetings of the Monetary Board and to submit for the consideration of the Board the policies and measures that he believes to be necessary to carry out the purposes and provisions of said Act;
2. Execute and administer the policies and measures approved by the Monetary Board;
3. Direct and supervise the operations and internal administration of the Bangko Sentral. The Governor may delegate certain of his administrative responsibilities to other officers or may assign specific tasks or responsibilities to any full-time member of the Monetary Board without additional remuneration or allowance whenever he may deem fit or subject to such rules and regulations as the Monetary Board may prescribe;
4. Appoint and fix the remunerations and other emoluments of personnel below the rank of a department head in accordance with the position and compensation plans approved by the Monetary Board, as well as to impose disciplinary measures upon personnel of the Bangko Sentral, subject to the provisions of Section 15(c) of said Act: Provided, That removal of personnel shall be with the approval of the Monetary Board;
5. Render opinions, decisions, or rulings, which shall be final and executory until reversed or modified by the Monetary Board, on matters regarding application or enforcement of laws pertaining to institutions supervised by the Bangko Sentral and laws pertaining to quasi-banks, as well as regulations, policies or instructions issued by the Monetary Board, and the implementation thereof; and
6. Exercise such other powers as may be vested in him by the Monetary Board.

In capacity as the principal representative of Bangko Sentral and the Monetary Board and in accordance with the instructions of the Monetary Board, he shall be empowered to:

1. Represent the Monetary Board and the Bangko Sentral in all dealings with other offices, agencies and instrumentalities of the Government, and all other persons or entities, public or private, whether domestic, foreign or international;
2. Sign contracts entered into by the Bangko Sentral, notes and securities issued by the Bangko Sentral, all reports, balance sheets, profit and loss statements, correspondence, and other documents of the Bangko Sentral;
3. Represent the Bangko Sentral, either personally or through counsel, including private counsel, as may be authorized by the Monetary Board, in any legal proceedings, action or specialized legal studies; and
4. Delegate his power to represent the Bangko Sentral, to other officers upon his own responsibility: Provided, however, That in order to preserve the integrity and the prestige of his office, the Governor of the Bangko Sentral may choose not to participate in preliminary discussions with any multilateral banking or financial institution on any negotiations for the Government within or outside the Philippines. During the negotiations, he may instead be represented by a permanent negotiator.

== List of governors of the Bangko Sentral ==
Governors of the Central Bank/Bangko Sentral
#	Name	Image	From	To	Presidents
1		Miguel Cuaderno Sr.	January 3, 1949	December 31, 1960	Elpidio Quirino; Ramon Magsaysay; Carlos P. Garcia
2		Andres Castillo	January 6, 1961	December 31, 1967	Carlos P. Garcia; Diosdado Macapagal; Ferdinand Marcos Sr.
3		Alfonso Calalang	January 1, 1968	January 9, 1970	Ferdinand Marcos Sr.
4		Gregorio Licaros	January 10, 1970	January 15, 1981	Ferdinand Marcos Sr.
5		Jaime C. Laya	January 16, 1981	January 18, 1984	Ferdinand Marcos Sr.
6		Jose B. Fernandez Jr.	January 19, 1984	February 19, 1990	Ferdinand Marcos Sr. Corazon Aquino
7		Jose L. Cuisia Jr.	February 20, 1990	July 2, 1993	Corazon Aquino; Fidel V. Ramos
8		Gabriel Singson	July 4, 1993	July 4, 1999	Fidel V. Ramos; Joseph Ejercito Estrada
9		Rafael Buenaventura	July 4, 1999	July 3, 2005	Joseph Ejercito Estrada; Gloria Macapagal Arroyo
10		Amando Tetangco Jr.	July 3, 2005	July 3, 2017	Gloria Macapagal Arroyo; Benigno S. Aquino III; Rodrigo Duterte
11		Nestor Espenilla Jr.	July 3, 2017	February 23, 2019*	Rodrigo Duterte
12		Benjamin Diokno	March 4, 2019	June 30, 2022	Rodrigo Duterte
13		Felipe Medalla	June 30, 2022	July 3, 2023	Bongbong Marcos
14		Eli M. Remolona, Jr.	July 3, 2023	Incumbent	Bongbong Marcos

*Died in office
