= Arthur Stanley Riggs =

Arthur Stanley Riggs (1879 – November 8, 1952) was an American writer, editor and historian, noted for his biographies of Titian and Velázquez.

== Biography ==
Riggs was born in New York City in 1879. In 1896, he took his first job as a clerk for Standard Oil Company in New York. In 1898, Riggs served with the Naval Auxiliary Force in the Spanish–American War. In 1900, Riggs worked for the New York newspapers the Commercial Advertiser, The Mail and Express and The New York Times.

In 1901, he married Elisabeth Adams Corey (died December 25, 1944).

He served as the director of the Archaeological Society of Washington from 1925 to 1935 and was editor of the society's magazine Art and Archaeology, and he served as librarian in the Office of Censorship during World War II. After the war, he also published adventure stories in various pulp magazines of the era, including Adventure (magazine).

Riggs died in Washington, D.C., on November 8, 1952. He was working at the time on a biography of Francis Drake called "Drake of the Seven Seas," which was unfinished and whose text is found in Riggs's papers at the Library of Congress.

== Legacy ==
The Liberty Ship SS Arthur Riggs was named for him.

== Works ==
- The Filipino Drama (1905)
- France from Sea to Sea. New York City: McBride, Nast & Company, May 1913.
- Vistas in Sicily. New York: McBride, Nast & Company, 1914., revised edition 1925.
- With Three Armies on and Behind the Western Front. Indianapolis: The Bobbs-Merrill Company, 1918.
- The Spanish Pageant. Indianapolis: The Bobbs-Merrill Company, 1928.
- The Romance of Human Progress. Indianapolis: The Bobbs-Merrill Company, 1938.
- Titian the Magnificent. Indianapolis: The Bobbs-Merrill Company, 1946.
- Velasquez: Painter of Truth and Prisoner of the King. Indianapolis: The Bobbs-Merrill Company, 1947.

== See also ==
- List of Liberty ships: A-F
