= Bangko Sentral ng Pilipinas =

Central bank of the Philippines

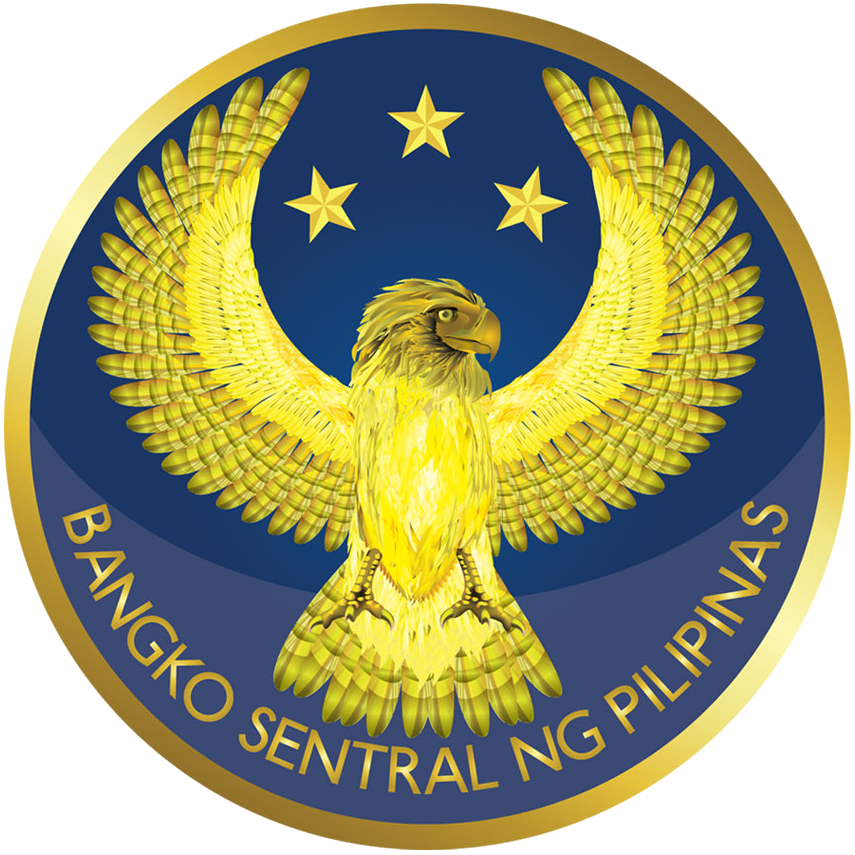

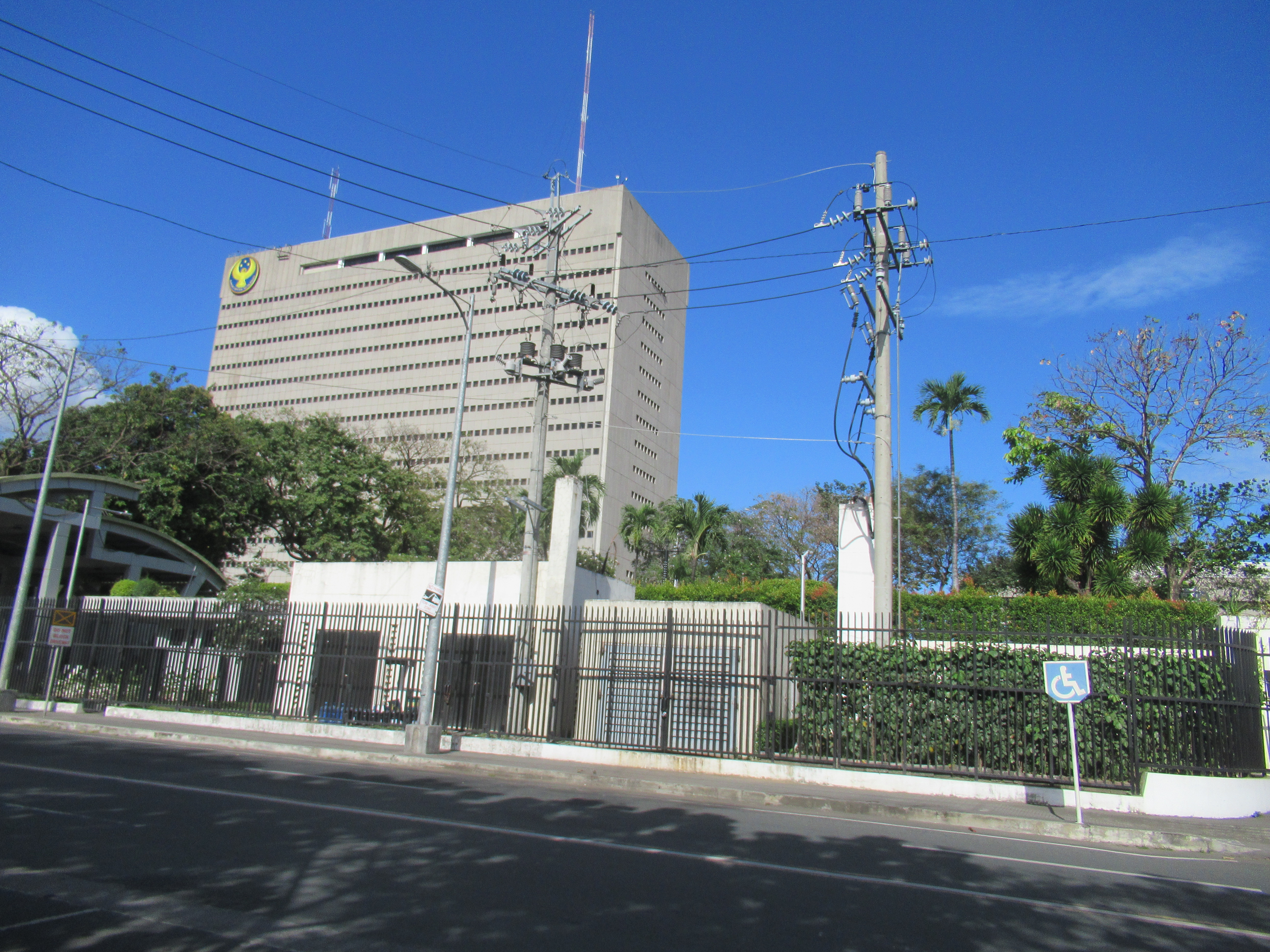
- The multi-storey building of the BSP Complex in Manila
- Central bank of: Philippines
- Headquarters: BSP Complex, Roxas Boulevard, Manila, Philippines
- Coordinates: 14°33′39″N 120°59′18″E
- Established: January 3, 1949; 77 years ago July 3, 1993; 33 years ago (reestablished as per the New Central Bank Act)
- Ownership: 100% government-owned with independence
- Governor: Eli M. Remolona, Jr.
- Currency: Philippine peso PHP (ISO 4217)
- Reserves: US$107.71 billion
- Bank rate: 5.25% (as of June 20, 2025)
- Preceded by: Central Bank of the Philippines (1949–1993); Philippine National Bank (1916–1949)
- Website: www.bsp.gov.ph

The Bangko Sentral ng Pilipinas (lit. 'Central Bank of the Philippines'; commonly abbreviated as BSP in both Filipino and English) is the government-owned central bank of the Philippines. It was established on January 3, 1949, and then re-established on July 3, 1993, pursuant to the provision of Republic Act 7653 or the New Central Bank Act of 1993 as amended by Republic Act 11211 or the New Central Bank Act of 2019.

== History ==
=== American era and World War II ===
In 1900, the First Philippine Commission passed Act No. 52. This placed all banks under the Bureau of the Treasury and authorized the Insular Treasurer to supervise and examine banks and all banking activity. In 1929, the Department of Finance, through the Bureau of Banking, took over bank supervision.

BSP Complex in Manila still bearing the 2010 logo, January 2021

By 1933, a group of Filipinos had conceptualized a central bank for the Philippine Islands. It came up with the rudiments of a bill for the establishment of a central bank after a careful study of the economic provisions of the Hare–Hawes–Cutting Act, which would grant Philippine independence after 12 years, but reserving military and naval bases for the United States and imposing tariffs and quotas on Philippine exports. However, the Hare–Hawes–Cutting Act would be rejected by the Senate of the Philippines at the urging of Commonwealth President Manuel L. Quezon. This Senate then advocated a new bill that won United States President Franklin D. Roosevelt's support, this would be the Tydings–McDuffie Act, which would grant Philippine independence on July 4, 1946.

Under the Commonwealth, discussions continued regarding the idea of a Philippine central bank that would promote price stability and economic growth. The country's monetary system then was administered by the Department of Finance and the National Treasury, and the Philippine peso was on the exchange standard using the United States dollar, which was backed by 100 percent gold reserve, as the standard currency.

As required by the Tydings–McDuffie Act, the National Assembly of the Philippines in 1939 passed a law establishing a central bank. As it was a monetary law, it required the approval of the President of the United States; Franklin D. Roosevelt did not give his. A second law was passed in 1944 under the Japanese-controlled Second Republic during the Second World War, but the 1945 arrival of American liberation forces, aided by Philippine Commonwealth troops and recognised guerrillas, aborted its implementation.

=== Third Republic and martial law ===
Shortly after President Manuel Roxas assumed office in 1946, he instructed then-Finance Secretary Miguel Cuaderno, Sr. to draw up a charter for a central bank. The establishment of a monetary authority became imperative a year later as a result of the findings of the Joint Philippine-American Finance Commission chaired by Cuaderno. The commission, which studied Philippine financial, monetary, and fiscal problems in 1947, recommended a shift from the dollar exchange standard to a managed currency system. A central bank was needed to implement this proposed shift.

Roxas then created the Central Bank Council to prepare the charter of a proposed monetary authority. It was submitted to Congress in February 1948. The Central Bank Act authored by then Congressman José J. Roy was signed into law in June of the same year by the newly proclaimed President Elpidio Quirino, who succeeded the late President Roxas, affixing his signature on Republic Act (RA) No. 265 or the Central Bank Act of 1948. On January 3, 1949, the Central Bank of the Philippines was formally inaugurated with Cuaderno as the first governor. The main duties and responsibilities of the Central Bank were to promote economic development and maintain internal and external monetary stability.

Over the years, changes were introduced to make the charter more responsive to the needs of the economy. On November 29, 1972, President Ferdinand Marcos' Presidential Decree No. 72 amended Republic Act No. 265, emphasizing the maintenance of domestic and international monetary stability as the primary objective of the Central Bank. The Bank's authority was also expanded to include regulation of the nation's entire financial system just supervision of the banking system. In 1981, RA 265, as amended, was further improved to strengthen the financial system, among the changes was the increase in the capitalization of the Central Bank from ₱10 million to ₱10 billion.

In the 1973 Constitution, the interim Batasang Pambansa (National Assembly) was mandated to establish an independent central monetary authority. Presidential Decree No. 1801 designated the Central Bank of the Philippines as the central monetary authority (CMA).

The Central Bank facilitated loans to Marcos cronies at Marcos's behest. Through these behest loans, large sums of money went to cronies' projects, including several that were not considered feasible.

In 1984, a Monetary Board report discovered that the Central Bank overstated the country's dollar reserves by approximately $600 million, which was caused by anomalous transactions made to overseas branches of the Philippine National Bank in a desperate effort to generate non-existent foreign exchange reserves to increase lending and credit creation. The Central Bank's financial stability was also undermined by large emergency loans that it made to failing institutions such as Banco Filipino and financing of government deficits and loss-making assets, which eroded its capital requirement. This eventually caused the Central Bank to become insolvent, effectively becoming bankrupt.

=== Present ===
Following the People Power Revolution which overthrew President Marcos, the 1987 Constitution adopted the CMA provisions from the 1973 Constitution that were aimed at establishing an independent monetary authority through increased capitalization and greater private sector representation in the Monetary Board.

In accordance with this provision, President Fidel V. Ramos signed Republic Act No. 7653, otherwise known as The New Central Bank Act, into law on June 14, 1993. Taking on the reins of the bankrupt Central Bank, the new law provided for the establishment of an independent monetary authority to be known as the "Bangko Sentral ng Pilipinas", with its primary objective being the maintenance of price stability, which was previously only implied in the old Central Bank charter. The law also gives the Bangko Sentral fiscal and administrative autonomy which the old Central Bank did not have. On July 3, 1993, the New Central Bank Act took effect.

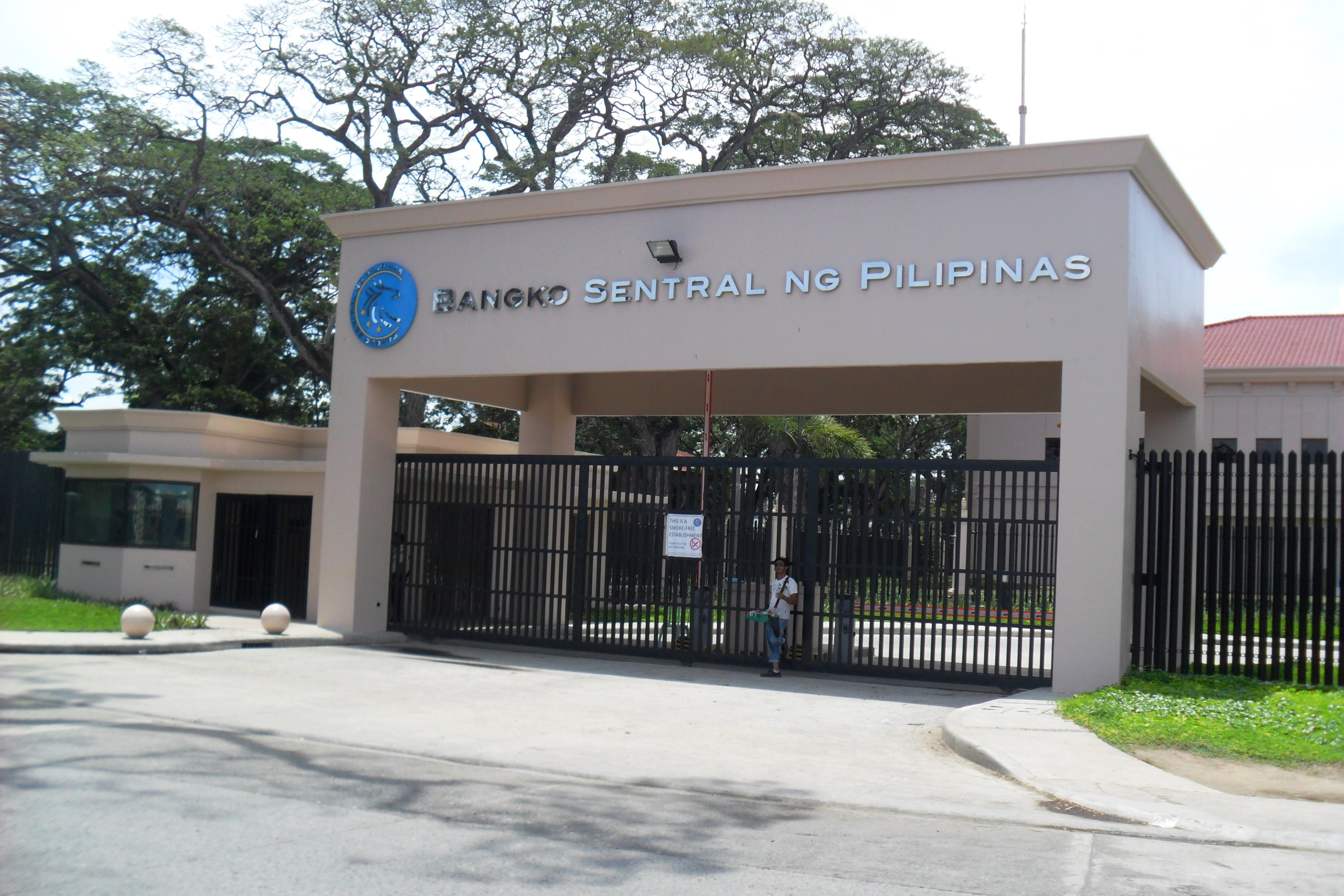
BSP Branch in Zamboanga City.

On the evening of September 26, 2012, a Wednesday, the BSP website was hacked by a group named Anonymous Philippines in a protest against the recently passed Cybercrime Prevention Act of 2012. The website was promptly restored in the early hours of the following day.

On April 23, 2013, The Asian Banker named the BSP as the Best Macroeconomic Regulator in the Asia-Pacific Region for 2013 in The Asian Banker Leadership Achievement Awards in Jakarta, Indonesia. The BSP was cited as a "good, strong, and fair-minded regulator." About a month later, the BSP was given the country award by the Child and Youth Finance International in its 2013 International Summit in Istanbul, Turkey, in recognition of its initiative to integrate financial literacy education into the Philippine elementary school curriculum. In 2019, President Rodrigo Duterte signed R.A. 11211 (principally authored by Franklin Drilon), further increasing the Bank's capitalization to ₱200 billion.

==== Project Nexus ====
The Bank for International Settlements signed an agreement with Central Bank of Malaysia, Bank of Thailand, Bangko Sentral ng Pilipinas, Monetary Authority of Singapore, and the Reserve Bank of India on 30 June 2024 as founding member of Project Nexus, a multilateral international initiative to enable retail cross-border payments. Bank Indonesia involved as a special observer. The platform, which is expected to go live by 2026, will interlink domestic fast payment systems of the member countries.

== Roles and responsibilities ==
As prescribed by the New Central Bank Act, the main functions of the Bangko Sentral are:

1. Liquidity management, by formulating and implementing monetary policy aimed at influencing money supply, consistent with its primary objective to maintain price stability,
2. Currency issue. The BSP has the exclusive power to issue the national currency. All notes and coins issued by the BSP are fully guaranteed by the Government and are considered legal tender for all private and public debts,
3. Lender of last resort, by extending discounts, loans and advances to banking institutions for liquidity purposes,
4. Financial supervision, by supervising banks and exercising regulatory powers over non-bank institutions performing quasi-banking functions,
5. Management of foreign currency reserves, by maintaining sufficient international reserves to meet any foreseeable net demands for foreign currencies in order to preserve the international stability and convertibility of the Philippine peso,
6. Determination of exchange rate policy, by determining the exchange rate policy of the Philippines. Currently, the BSP adheres to a market-oriented foreign exchange rate policy, and
7. Being the banker, financial advisor and official depository of the Government, its political subdivisions and instrumentalities and fellow GOCCs.

== Organization ==
The basic structure of the Bangko Sentral includes:

- The Monetary Board, which exercises the powers and functions of the BSP, such as the conduct of monetary policy and supervision of the financial system;
- The Monetary and Economics Sector, which takes charge of the formulation and implementation of the BSP's monetary policy, including serving the banking needs of all banks through accepting deposits, servicing withdrawals and extending credit through the rediscounting facility;
- The Financial Supervision Sector, which enforces and monitors compliance to banking laws to promote a sound and healthy banking system;
- The Payments and Currency Management Sector, which maintains the safety and integrity of the Philippine currency and ensuring a well-functioning payments and cash ecosystem;
- The Corporate Services Sector, which serves the human, financial and physical resource needs of the BSP; and
- The Regional Operations and Advocacy Sector, which manages activities related to regional operations, consumer empowerment and advocacy, and communications.

The powers and function of the Bangko Sentral are exercised by its Monetary Board, whose seven members are appointed by the President of the Philippines. As provided for by RA 7653 or the New Central Bank Act, one of the government sector members of the Monetary Board must also be a member of Cabinet. Members of the Monetary Board are prohibited from holding certain positions in other government agencies and private institutions that may give rise to conflicts of interest. The members have fixed and overlapping terms, except for the Cabinet Secretary representing the incumbent administration.

The current members of the Monetary Board are:

- Eli M. Remolona, Jr. – BSP Governor and Chairman of the Monetary Board
  - Zeno Ronald R. Abenoja – Deputy Governor for Monetary and Economics Sector
  - Chuchi G. Fonacier – Deputy Governor for Financial Supervision Sector
  - Mamerto E. Tangonan – Deputy Governor for Payments and Currency Management Sector
  - Eduardo G. Bobier – Deputy Governor for Corporate Services Sector
  - Bernadette Romulo-Puyat – Deputy Governor for Regional Operations and Advocacy Sector
- Frederick Go - Secretary of the Department of Finance
- Benjamin Diokno - Monetary Board Member
- Rosalia V. De Leon - Monetary Board Member, former National Treasurer
- Romeo L. Bernardo - Monetary Board Member, former undersecretary of the Department of Finance
- Walter C. Wassmer - Monetary Board Member
- Jose Querubin - Monetary Board Member

== Convertible currencies ==
The Bangko Sentral has 32 currencies directly convertible with the Philippine peso, which serves as a benchmark for all Philippine banks.

Convertible currencies with Bangko Sentral:

- (Australia) Australian dollar (AUD)
- (Bahrain) Bahraini dinar (BHD)
- (United Kingdom) British pound (GBP)
- Brunei dollar (BND)
- (Canada) Canadian dollar (CAD)
- (China) Chinese yuan (CNY)
- (Europe) Euro (EUR)
- Hong Kong dollar (HKD)
- (Indonesia) Indonesian rupiah (IDR)
- (Japan) Japanese yen (JPY)
- (South Korea) South Korean won (KRW)
- (Kuwait) Kuwaiti dinar (KWD)
- (Saudi Arabia) Saudi riyal (SAR)
- Singapore dollar (SGD)
- (Switzerland) Swiss franc (CHF)
- (Thailand) Thai baht (THB)
- United Arab Emirates dirham (AED)
- United States dollar (USD)

Others (Not Convertible With BSP):

- Argentina Peso (ARS)
- Brazil Real (BRL)
- Denmark Kroner (DKK)
- India Rupee (INR)
- Malaysia Ringgit (MYR)
- Mexico New Peso (MXN)
- New Zealand Dollar (NZD)
- Norway Kroner (NOK)
- Pakistan Rupee (PKR)
- South Africa Rand (ZAR)
- Sweden Kroner (SEK)
- Syria Pound (SYP)
- Taiwan NT Dollar (TWD)
- Venezuela Bolivar (VES)

== Microfinance and financial inclusion ==
In 2000, the General Banking Law mandated the BSP to recognize microfinance as a legitimate banking activity and to set the rules and regulations for its practice within the banking sector. In the same year, the BSP declared microfinance as its flagship program for poverty alleviation. The BSP has become the prime advocate for the development of microfinance. To this end, the Bangko Sentral aims to:

1. Provide the enabling policy and regulatory environment;
2. Increase the capacity of the BSP and banking sector on microfinance operations; and
3. Promote and advocate for the development of sound and sustainable microfinance operations.

The Bank is active in promoting a financial inclusion policy and is a leading member of the Alliance for Financial Inclusion. It is also one of the original 17 regulatory institutions to make specific national commitments to financial inclusion under the Maya Declaration during the 2011 Global Policy Forum held in Mexico.

== Anti-money laundering ==
With money laundering being one of the problems of the Philippines, the BSP has issued a number of measures to bring the Philippines' regulatory regime on money laundering closer to international standards. In September 2001, the Anti-Money Laundering Act, or AMLA, was made into law. The AMLA defined money laundering a criminal offense, and prescribed corresponding penalties. It also provided the foundation for a central monitoring and implementing council called the Anti-Money Laundering Council (AMLC). The AMLC is composed of the Governor of the Bangko Sentral as chair, and the Commissioner of the Insurance Commission and the Chairman of the Securities and Exchange Commission as members, all acting unanimously in the discharge of the group's mandate.

In February 2013, Philippine President Benigno Aquino III signed "Republic Act No. 10365" known as An Act Further Strengthening the Anti-Money Laundering Law, which aims to strengthen the AMLC by requiring that any suspicious transaction in foreign exchange, real estate, and jewelry and precious metal trading be reported.

The Bangko Sentral ng Pilipinas (BSP) introduced regulations in September 2025 requiring enhanced due diligence for cash transactions exceeding ₱500,000 per day, as part of efforts to combat money laundering and corruption.

== Logo ==
Logo used since March 2010. Still used secondarily nowadays

The 2020 logo of the Bangko Sentral was first adopted as the its primary logo on November 20, 2020, with the design receiving endorsement by the National Historical Commission of the Philippines (NHCP). The circular symbol features a full-bodied gold-colored Philippine eagle based on actual photographs of the bird and three stars.

The logo featuring a more stylized rendition of the eagle is still used since March 2010 upon the announcement of an imminent start of print run and subsequent release to the public of New Generation Currency (NGC) from November to December 2010 where an earlier design that is closer to the final during its production was previewed and then unveiled to the public on May 7, 2010. Six months after the unveiling, it was used on NGC banknotes printed from its initial batch in November 2010 to December 2022 and coins from November 30, 2017, until the said month of 2022, and on the central bank's headquarters in Manila and Security Plant Complex in Quezon City from 2012 to 2022. It is concurrently used with the 1993 and 2020 logos since March 2010 and November 20, 2020, respectively.

== Museum ==
Within the main Manila complex of the BSP is the Museo ng Bangko Sentral ng Pilipinas (English: Museum of the Bangko Sentral ng Pilipinas). Inaugurated on January 3, 1999, as part of the golden jubilee of central banking in the country, the Museo showcases the BSP's collection of currencies.

As repository and custodian of the country's numismatic heritage, the Museo collects, studies and preserves coins, paper notes, medals, artifacts and monetary items found in the Philippines during its different historical periods. These collections have been placed on permanent display at the Museo. Designed to "walk" the visitor through a number of galleries dedicated to a specific historical period of the country, the Museo visually narrates the development of the Philippine economy, parallel to the evolution of its currency. Complementary paintings from the BSP's art collection, together with chosen artifacts, enhance each gallery.

A panoramic memorabilia of central banking in the Philippines, it showcases the strides made in bringing about price stability to sustain economic growth in the country. The exhibition hall also features portrait busts of previous governors.

== Security Plant Complex ==
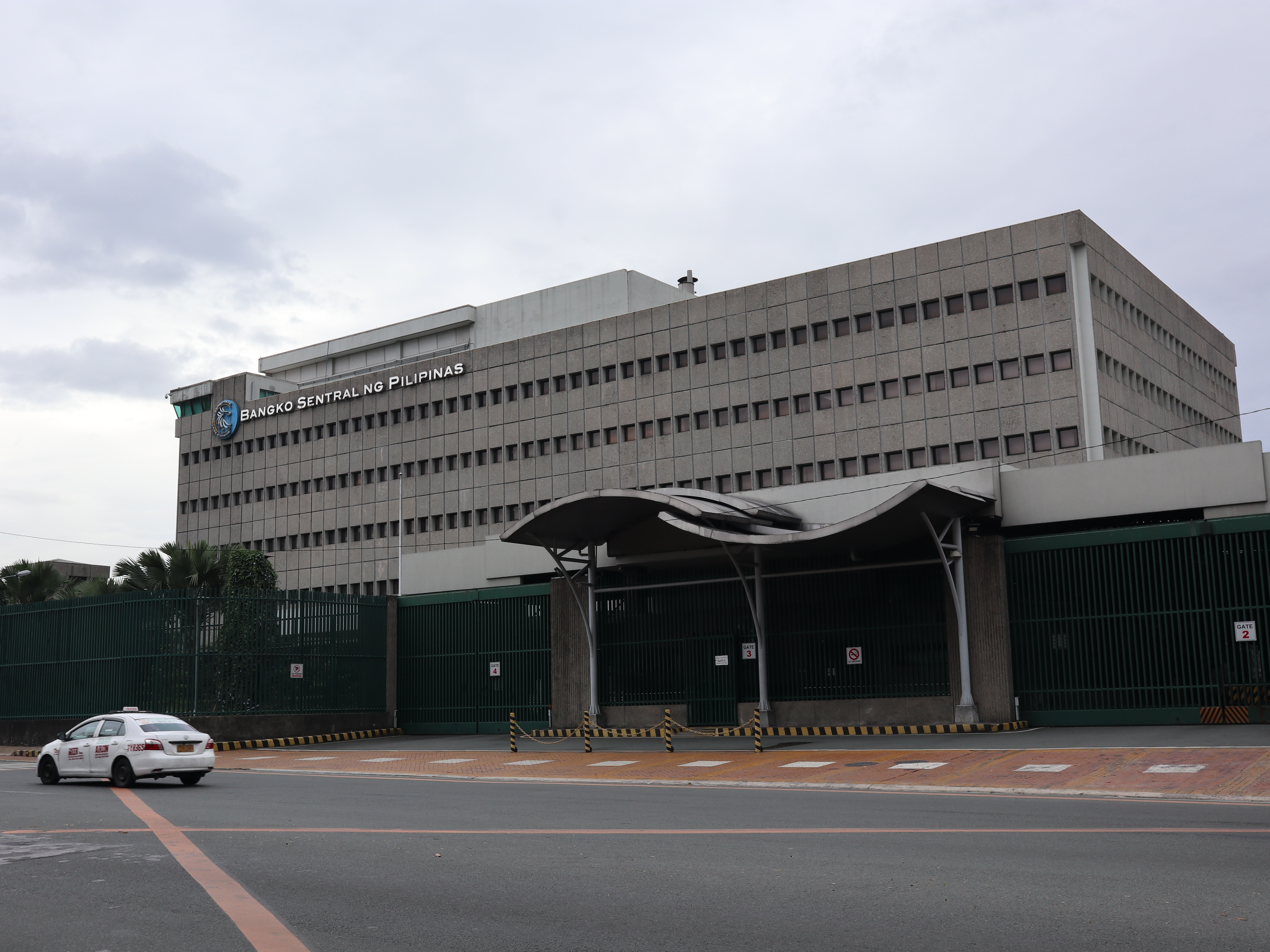
Security Plant Complex in Quezon City.

The Security Plant Complex, or SPC, was formally established on September 7, 1978, to safeguard the printing, minting, refining, issuance, distribution and durability of coins, banknotes, gold bars, government official receipts, lottery tickets, internal revenue stamps, passports, seaman identification record books, strip stamps, official documents, registration certificates, Torrens titles, treasury warrants, stocks and bonds, government contracts, ration coupons, official ballots, election return forms, checks and other security printing or minting jobs of the Philippine government.

Printing of official ballots and other public documents was later transferred to the National Printing Office pursuant to Executive Order No. 285 issued on July 25, 1987.

On August 4, 2003, President Gloria Macapagal Arroyo issued "Administrative Order No. 79", which designated the SPC as the sole producer of insignia of national orders, decorations, and medals.

The BSP will relocate its security plant complex from East Avenue, Quezon City to the National Government Administrative Center district of New Clark City in Capas, Tarlac after it signed a memorandum of agreement with the Bases Conversion and Development Authority in September 2019. The new currency production facility will be located on a 29-hectare (72-acre) plot near the access road connecting New Clark City in Pampanga to the Subic–Clark–Tarlac Expressway and it is expected to be completed within two years.

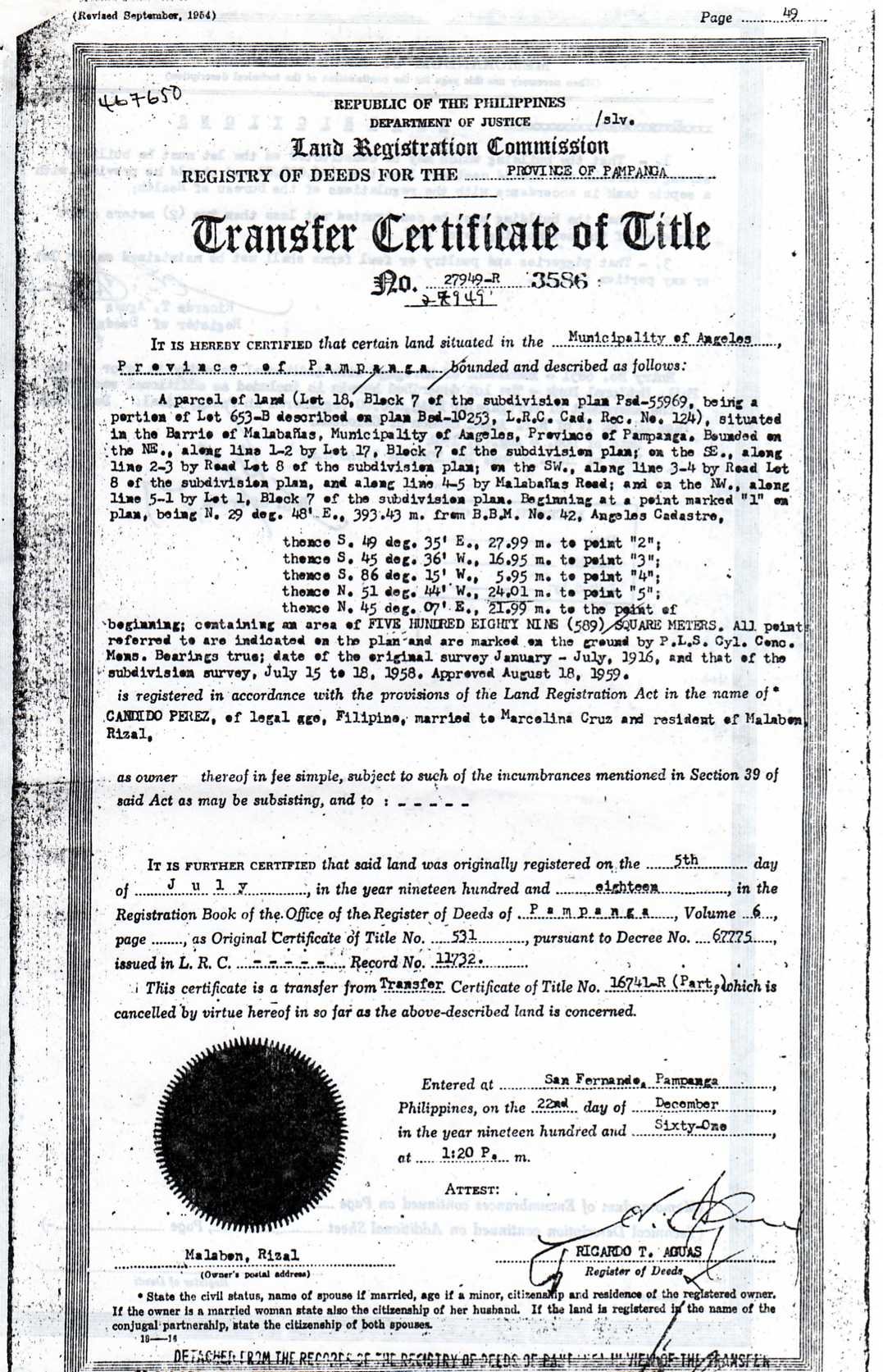
A Philippine Torrens title, dated to December 1961

Current version of the Philippine passport, equipped with biometric technology.

== See also ==
- List of central banks
- List of financial supervisory authorities by country

== Publications ==
- Villegas, Ramón N. (1983). Kayamanan: The Philippine Jewelry Tradition. Central Bank of the Philippines. ISBN 9711039001.
- Montemayor, Rafaelita V.; et al. (1998). 50 Years of Central Banking in the Philippines. Manila, Philippines: Bangko Sentral ng Pilipinas. ISBN 971-91785-1-5. OCLC 42772558.
