= Pinoy Big Brother: Kumunity Season 10 – Adult Edition =

Pinoy Big Brother: Kumunity Season 10 Adult Edition
- Season 10
- Hosted by: Toni Gonzaga (until February 9, 2022); Bianca Gonzalez; Robi Domingo
- No. of days: 70
- No. of housemates: 17
- Top 2: Nathan Juane; Isabel Laohoo
- Companion show: Kumulitan, Kumunity: G sa Gabi, and Kumulitan Weekends (online via Kumu)

Release
- Original network: Kapamilya Channel
- Original release: January 2 – March 12, 2022

Season chronology
- ← Previous; Kumunity Season 10: Celebrity Edition (In season) Next → Kumunity Season 10: Teen Edition (In season)

The adult edition of Pinoy Big Brother: Kumunity Season 10 premiered on Kapamilya Channel, Jeepney TV and A2Z on January 2, 2022. The second edition in the multi-part season, this edition featured contestants (known as Housemates) from the Adult Kumunity, which composes of civilians aged twenty through forty.

This edition saw the departure of host Toni Gonzaga from the show following her controversial appearance at the proclamation rally of presidential candidate Bongbong Marcos. Her exit marked the promotion of Bianca Gonzalez as the main host, assuming Gonzaga's duties for the remainder of the season alongside Robi Domingo.

The edition ended on March 12, 2022, following 70 days of competition. Nathan Juane and Isabel Laohoo were named as the Kumunity's Top 2, advancing to the final part of the season.

== Production ==
=== Auditions ===
The online auditions opened on September 1, to auditionees aged 20 to 40. During the launch night, it was announced that the show received as total of 33,319 audition videos for the Adult Edition. Also announced was the extension of the submission of audition videos for the adults from October 16 to 31.

=== Online Bahay ni Kuya ===
Turned over from the previous edition, three additional civilian housemates were chosen from the Online Bahay ni Kuya Kumu campaign. There will be one winner for each of the three Kumunities: the Male, Female, and LGBTQIA+ Kumunities. The campaign was held from December 1, 2021, until January 1, 2022.

Andrei King, Kathleen Agir, and Roque Coting emerged as the winners of their respective Kumunities and were declared as official civilian housemates for this season.

== Overview ==
=== Title card change ===
A new title card has been made for this edition. Since the theme for this edition is airport-themed, it differs from the previous edition which lacked a unique title card. Instead, this edition's title card features a moving airplane on a red and blue background with tickets displaying the hometowns of the civilian housemates, and the title card didn't mention the editions' title. That would change until the next edition began, which displayed their editions' name below the logo of the season.

=== The House ===
Prior to the release of this edition, only a small portion of the House's interior had been removed. The confession rooms' color has been changed from yellow to red, and only a few lines of their editions' theme song, "Pinoy Ako," are based on the neon lights displayed throughout the house.

=== Theme songs ===
The theme song for this edition is a new cover of the series' theme song, Pinoy Ako, now re-titled as Pinoy Tayo, by Rico Blanco and Jonathan Manalo which was originally sung by the band Orange and Lemons, which debuted on the Sunday variety show ASAP Natin 'To and then was sung on the opening night of this edition by Blanco with ex-celebrity housemates Alexa Ilacad and KD Estrada.

The eviction theme song for this edition is entitled "When I See You Again", written and performed by both Ilacad and Estrada.

=== Twists ===
- Pre-existing Relationships – Two of the adult housemates, Nathan and Raf Juane, who are siblings in real life, were tasked to serve their fellow housemates in the opening days of the Adult Batch while maintaining their relationship as siblings as a secret. If the siblings manage to keep their secret, they will be given their first weekly budget and one of them will be given a Nomination Immunity Pass.
- Ligtask Challenges – Nominated housemates will undergo several challenges to save themselves from evictions. These will serve as an eviction process for the nominated housemates.
- Houseplayers — This edition first featured houseplayers that can possibly claim Final Five spots by posing as late-entry housemates, through methods of sabotaging the House and threatening the housemates, and by accomplishing tasks given by Big Brother.
- The Secret Room — This edition also featured the adult housemates that were fake evicted for failing their Ligtask challenge. Instead of being actually evicted from the House, they were sent to a secret room by Big Brother until his given time.
- The Challengers — This edition featured the other four Final 5 housemates the possibility to snatch all the diamonds from its reigning diamond holder through a series of challenger tasks given by Big Brother.

== Housemates ==
The first two adult housemates, siblings Nathan and Raf Juane, entered the house during the Celebrity Kumunity Top 2 reveal on Day 7 (January 1), where they were also assigned their weekly secret task. The following day (Day 78), the remaining eight adult housemates entered the house. Meanwhile, three more adult housemates entered the house on Day 97, and the remaining three adult housemates who won the Online Bahay ni Kuya campaign on Kumu entered two days later on Day 99, along with houseguest Glenda Victorio.

Name	Age on Entry	Hometown	Occupation	Day entered	Day exited	Status	Refs.
Nathan Juane	33	Las Piñas	Flight instructor	Day 77	Day 147	Adult Top 2	
Isabel Laohoo	26	Leyte	Entrepreneur and fashion designer	Day 78	Day 147	Adult Top 2	
Zach Guerrero	22	Aurora	Dentistry student	Day 78	Day 147	Evicted	
Michael Ver Comaling	21	Leyte	Modern pentathlete	Day 78	Day 147	Evicted	
Seham Daghlas	23	Iloilo	Vlogger and influencer	Day 78	Day 147	Evicted	
Raf Juane	25	Las Piñas	Vlogger	Day 77	Day 141	Evicted	
Laziz Rustamov	24	Tashkent, Uzbekistan	Model	Day 78	Day 141	Evicted	
Roque Coting	24	Davao de Oro	Salesman	Day 99	Day 133	Evicted	
Gin Regidor	21	Cebu	Cemetery vendor	Day 78	Day 133	Evicted	
Kathleen Agir-Zarandin	25	United States	Caregiver	Day 99	Day 133	Evicted	–
Basti Macaraan	22	Milan, Italy	Fast food service crew	Day 97	Day 126	Evicted	
Jaye Macaraan	26	Milan, Italy	Fast food service crew	Day 97	Day 126	Evicted	
Aleck Iñigo	23	Las Piñas	Delivery rider and athlete	Day 78	Day 119	Evicted	
Rica Kriemhild	22	Bologna, Italy	Theatre actress and vlogger	Day 97	Day 119	Evicted	–
Andrei King	25	Taguig	Content creator and vlogger	Day 99	Day 112	Evicted	
Thamara Alexandria	22	Davao City	Model and actress	Day 78	Day 112	Evicted	

=== Housemates ===
- Isabel Laohoo: Billed as the "Bubbly Boss Lady of Leyte", she is a businesswoman from the Eastern Visayan cities of Catbalogan and Tacloban known for her humility, wholesomeness, and leadership throughout the edition
- Nathan Juane: Known as the "Pursigidong Papiloto of Las Piñas" ("Determined Dad-Pilot of Las Piñas"), he is a flight instructor who displayed strong leadership and task performance. He is also the older brother of fellow housemate Raf, and initially introduced himself as a pilot named "Policarpio"
- Zach Guerrero: Called the "Smillenial Chamer of Aurora", he is a dentistry student who showed character growth during the course of the edition, especially during a heated confrontation with houseplayer Marky Miranda. He was also commonly paired with Thamara, and later Seham.
- Michael Ver Comaling: Billed as the "Mr. Pentastic of Leyte", he is an athlete and model notable for strong task performances, albeit was unpopular with the viewers as he was frequently described as a showoff, including scenes where he was visibly agitated after he was given 8 out of 8 possible nomination points, eavesdropping during a private conversation between Seham and Zach, and talking about the Juane siblings in a negative manner to Laziz
- Seham Daghlas: Called the "Brightminded Darling of Iloilo", she is a vlogger who was initially very popular with viewers due to her girl-next-door look and her engineering background. However, her popularity significantly declined in the latter part of the edition due to a sudden personality change, with some of her actions during the last 3 weeks of the edition being dubious and unpopular with the viewers, such as routinely favoring Michael over Zach (even flirting with him several times), below-par performances in tasks, and nominating Isabel, her closest friend in the house, on consecutive occasions.
- Raf Juane: Known as the "Ms. Beauty Kabo-guru of Las Piñas", she is a vlogger who is the sister of fellow housemate Nathan. She welcomed the first 8 housemates (not including herself and Nathan) to the PBB house as a flight attendant
- Laziz Rustamov: Known as the "Modelskarteng Breadwinner of Uzbekistan", he was mostly known for his diligence inside the Big Brother house and his close friendship with Nathan
- Roque Coting: Salesman from Davao de Oro notable for nominating other housemates due to them "umuutot" (farting)
- Gin Regidor: A cemetery vendor whose house was repaired as a reward for a weekly task after it was damaged by Typhoon Rai. She also showed leadership during the edition, particularly during the Drag Week
- Kathleen Agir-Zarandin: Caregiver from California whose temper got her in conflicts with several housemates, most notably with Aleck. Ironically, the duo would be in a relationship a few months after the edition ended
- Basti Macaraan: Service crew from Milan notable for pursuing a romantic relationship with Rica, including a scene of him serenading her by the pool area. He is the younger brother of Jaye
- Jaye Macaraan: Service crew from Milan mostly notable for having a romantic interest on fellow housemate Isabel. He is the older brother of Basti
- Aleck Iñigo: A delivery rider and an athlete who was most notable for his friendship with Michael and romantic pursuit of Rica, which lead to his early exit from the Big Brother house
- Rica Kriemhild: A theatre actress from Bologna, her stint in the edition was mostly notable for her relationships with male housemates, which was viewed unfavorably by viewers
- Andrei King: An influencer who was evicted early due to being automatically nominated as a result of failing to become a "boss" during the Capital Task week
- Thamara Alexandria: An actress known as the "Headstrong Hottie of Davao", she was the first evicted housemate of the edition after other housemates nominated her due to her allegedly being "mataray" (sassy or intimidating)

== Houseplayers ==
This season featured houseplayers that served as a challenge to the current housemates through methods such as sabotaging, harsh behaviors, acting as a threat to their status as a housemate, and competing with the housemates in the series of tasks intended to bring a set of housemates to the Final Five of each Kumunity. Most of the rules observed by the housemates still apply to the houseplayers.

The chosen houseplayers will then enter the house after they have successfully completed their mandatory quarantine and COVID-19 testing at a later date as part of the show's strict health protocols.

To determine the first two houseplayers of the season, two separate Kumu campaigns were held during the run of the Adult Edition. The top five winners will first undergo screening with the production team of the show, wherein one of them in each campaign will become a houseplayer and have the chance to become a co-host in PBB Kumulitan, the show's online companion show. As for the other four streamers that are not chosen, they will instead have a virtual appearance in the house—they explained the task that was given to them and to the housemates.

The first campaign was held on January 22 until January 27, 2022, while the second campaign was held on February 5 until February 10, 2022. Marky Miranda and Jannene Anne Nidoy were selected the first two houseplayers of the season.

- Marky Miranda is the season's first houseplayer. By impressing the housemates with his strong aura and personality at first, he successfully sabotaged the housemates by posing as a late-entry housemate, and then acting crazy and rebellious after he had a quick glimpse of the housemates. After drinking whiskey while Zach Guerrero was celebrating his birthday inside the house, Miranda had a confrontation with Guerrero, Nathan Juane, and Michael Ver Comaling. The next day, they apologized to each other.
- Jannene Anne "Ja" Nidoy is the season's second houseplayer. Entering the same day as Miranda, she was very shy to the housemates at first, but she immediately became friends with Raf Juane and Seham Daghlas after revealing her occupation as a vlogger and an influencer. Even though she and Miranda had a plan to sabotage the housemates, she handed the sabotage button over to Miranda alone and stayed with Juane during the confrontation by between fellow houseplayer Miranda and Guerrero by acting innocent—that she didn't know about it. She also had a close friendship with the Adult Final Five shortly after their exit.

List of Pinoy Big Brother: Kumunity Season 10 Adult houseplayers
Name	Age on Entry	Hometown	Occupation	Day entered	Day exited	Status
Ja Nidoy	21	Laguna	Social media influencer and vlogger	Day 136	Day 142	Exited
Marky Miranda	27	Cavite	Entrepreneur and theatre actor	Day 136	Day 142	Exited

Houseplayer campaign results for Adult Edition
Houseplayer 1 Campaign Top Earners (from January 22–27, 2022)				Houseplayer 2 Campaign Top Earners (from February 5–10, 2022)			
Rank	Name	Diamonds earned (in millions)	Result	Rank	Name	Diamonds earned (in millions)	Result
1	Marky Miranda	13.26	Selected	1	Marco Roxas	6.55	Not selected
2	Shanna May	11.89	Not selected	2	Kobe Medalla	4.06	Not selected
3	Mark Fayo Hilongo	10.59	Not selected	3	Niña Demata	3.25	Not selected
4	Jun Sunga	10.25	Not selected	4	Marylene Arellano	3.06	Not selected
5	Kimpoy Feliciano	7.90	Not selected	5	Jannene Anne Nidoy	2.80	Selected

== Houseguests ==
=== Online Guesting ===
- Day 121: Lyg Carillo, also known as Maria Christina, a drag queen, helped the housemates virtually in regards on their PBB Drag Race weekly task. She was tasked to practice the housemates' journey to being a drag queen and helped in creating their gowns.
- Day 122: Eva Le Queen, a drag queen, also helped the housemates in their PBB Drag Race task a day after Carillo's virtual guesting. She was tasked to judge the housemates' dance for their weekly task.
- Day 126: Brigiding, a drag queen, and former 737 regular housemate Dawn Chang were invited by Big Brother to judge the housemates' performance for their PBB Drag Race weekly task.

=== Physical Guesting ===
- Day 99: First entered as a houseguest from the previous season, Brilliant Skin Essentials CEO Glenda Victorio returned to the Big Brother House again as a houseguest to assist the Adult housemates with their Big Online 10-dahan weekly task. Victorio stayed inside the house for two weeks until her exit on Day 112.

== Tasks ==
=== Weekly tasks ===
Task No.	Date given	Task title and description	Result
1	January 1 (Day 78)	Secret Siblings Task; A day before the entry of the other adult housemates, Nathan and Raf were given their first weekly task. They must make sure that for the entire week, the others will not find out that they are siblings.	Passed
2	January 9 (Day 86)	Build a House; Three at a time, the housemates must build a six-feet house made by wall blocks using an improvised tools made by Aleck, Michael Ver, and Zach were isolated in the secret room. Meanwhile, the three isolated housemates must build the frame and roof of the house they built. The housemates must not use their hands to place the blocks—instead, they must use the tools provided by the three isolated housemates. To complete the task, the house must be stable within ten minutes. Once completed, the reward of a task is to re-build Gin's house that was devastated by Typhoon Odette.	Passed
3	January 18 (Day 95)	Pinoy Big Video Challenge; The housemates were tasked to create three videos that will be posted on the show's social media accounts the day after the shooting of their videos. The housemates must reach at least 10,000 Kumu Klips of their videos that must be re-enacted by the Kumunity through Kumu to win this task.^{1}	Failed
4	January 24 (Day 101)	The Big Online 10-dahan (English: The Big Online Store); The housemates must form an online startup company to buy and sell the products that they have made through a series of tasks. The boss of their company can be replaced once voted by a majority; the incumbent boss within the end of the weekly task will be given immunity for the first nominations. The bosses of their company during their weekly task: No. / Day elected / Elected boss / Votes given / Day removed; 1 / January 24 (Day 101) / Michael Ver / 14–3 (against Glenda) / January 28 (Day 105); 1 / January 24 (Day 101) / Michael Ver / 9–4–2–1–1 (against Roque, Glenda, Raf, and Nathan) / January 28 (Day 105); 2 / January 28 (Day 105) / Isabel / 7–5–3–1–1 (against Kathleen, Seham, Glenda, and Nathan) / January 29 (Day 106); 3 / January 29 (Day 106) / Kathleen^{2} / 8–4–2–2–1 (against Isabel, Michael, Glenda, and Aleck) / February 8 (Day 116); To win this task, they must earn a capital of a minimum of at least ₱75,000 and a maximum of ₱100,000 at the end of the week. The sales that they will earn at the end of this task will then be donated to the victims of Typhoon Odette. The incumbent boss of the company must not participate on the capital tasks; only the board members and Glenda, the houseguest, can participate. The capital tasks given on The Big Online 10-dahan weekly task: No. / Day given / Task / Participants / Maximum capital to be earned / Capital earned; 1 / January 26 (Day 103) / Vault of Balls; There are 1,000 black balls placed on a vault, which will be scattered on the floor once the door of the vault is twisted. Only three of the housemates will only get each ball using their hands. They are given 100 seconds to place all of the balls into the vault again. ₱20 will be added to the capital for every ball placed into the vault. / Glenda, Isabel, Raf / ₱20,000 / ₱12,660 (placed 633 balls); 2 / January 27 (Day 104) / Capital Tower of Blocks; The housemates must stack and balance the boxes that spell the word "capital" while getting 10 blue balls placed around the play area. A player will balance and get the balls, and two players will stack and balance the boxes. If the boxes fall down, they must balance the boxes again to get a ball. They are given 6 minutes to get all of the blue balls. ₱3,000 will be added to the capital for every blue ball taken. / Seham, Nathan, Isabel / ₱30,000 / ₱30,000 (got 10 blue balls); 3 / January 28 (Day 105) / The Elevated Pathway; The housemates must construct an elevated pathway using the tools provided by Big Brother and must start from the living area to the activity area; from there, the housemates must form four sides for the balls to rotate to the other side. An amount is assigned on every side, with the box on the center of the activity area being the highest. If the ball falls, they must begin on the living area again. ₱50,000 will be added to the capital once the ball lands on the center of the activity area. If not, the peak side of where the ball landed will be their final capital. / Gin, Seham, Laziz, Aleck, Michael Ver / ₱50,000 / ₱40,000 (peaked on the fourth side); Total capital earned / / / / / ₱82,660	Passed
5	February 7 (Day 115)^{3}	Love Sacrifice; In connection to the upcoming Valentine's Day celebration inside the House, the housemates must create enough paper flowers to fill the big broken heart found in the center of the activity area.^{4}	Passed
6	February 13 (Day 121)	PBB Drag Race; Similar to RuPaul's Drag Race, the housemates must dress, act, and perform like drag queens and must do a dancing and lip-syncing challenge.^{5} To complete this task, both groups must get at least 90% of the average score from the judges and from the Kumunity. Teams: Roqueens: Roque (leader), Isabel, Jaye, Nathan, Seham, and Zach; Ginwin: Gin (leader), Basti, Kathleen, Laziz, Michael Ver, and Raf; The result of the PBB Drag Race task: Dawn Chang / Brigiding / Kumunity; 91% / 95% / 23.37%^{6}; Total Average Score / / 69.8%	Failed
7	February 23 (Day 131)	Endurance Challenge; To test their endurance, patience, and teamwork, the housemates must build 10 wooden pillars at the height of a circular base. Each wooden pillar is 1 foot high and each pillar has 2 wooden blocks that overlap. Once completed, they should lay a circle cover on top of it. The five housemates inside the house (Laziz, Michael Ver, Nathan, Raf, and Seham) need to move the pillars by pulling the leash to transport it from the garden area to a stand located in front of the activity area, while the five other housemates that were fake-evicted during their Ligtask challenge (Gin, Isabel, Kathleen, Roque, and Zach) in the activity area do the same from one end of the activity area to the other. The housemates should not be too close to the base of the handle of the strap. There are fixed knots on the ropes as a sign of the correct distance between them. If this task is considered successful, the housemates will not only receive their weekly budget, they will also be reunited with the fake-evicted housemates.^{7}	Passed
8	March 2 (Day 138)	Stand Up; The housemates, including the houseplayers, must stand up for eight hours. The timer displayed on a TV located in the living area will start once the housemates stand when the weekly task leaders have announced the weekly task to the housemates. The timer will temporarily stop when a housemate sits, kneels, or leans during the duration of the weekly task, even when the housemates use the comfort room, or sits in the confession room, except for when they are called by Big Brother for their bed time. When the housemates wake up in the morning during the duration of this weekly task, they have 5 seconds to immediately stand up after they hear the wake-up call as a sign that the timer will start ticking again. For the final night of this weekly task, both the housemates and the houseplayers were challenged to walk and stand constantly without giving up for a period amount of time, as said and set by Big Brother. If the housemates and the houseplayers manage to stand for eight hours within the end of the week, they will be given their weekly budget; otherwise, if they don't, they will lose their weekly budget and must ration their food for their final week in the House.	Passed
9	March 6 (Day 142)^{8}	Charity Task; Served as both a charity and a weekly task, five selected housemates must step on a color-coded part on the floor chosen by a digital roulette. Then, they must use a paddle to pass a ball to another housemate to a container provided in the play area. One hundred pesos (₱100) will be added for every ball inserted in the container. They can shoot a maximum of 1,000 balls for this weekly task, possibly giving one hundred thousand pesos (₱100,000) if they shoot all of the balls to the chosen charity. All of the earnings that they will accumulate after the end of this weekly task will be donated to St. Arnold Janssen Kalinga Foundation, Inc., the fifth beneficiary Kumunity for this season.^{9}	Passed

Notes

Adults

1. The adult housemates were informed by Big Brother that the result of this weekly task will be displayed on the plasma TV; if the face of Karlito, the tarsier mascot of Kumu, is happy, signifies success; if sad, signifies failure. After revealing the result by revealing each part of the picture, a sad Karlito was shown, meaning that they have failed this weekly task.
2. Kathleen was elected as the last boss of their company the day after completing their third capital task; thus making her safe from the nominations. This was in connection to their secret weekly task given to them on Day 101, making Andrei and Roque the first two nominees of the first nominations.
3. Aleck and Rica were in the house when the task was performed. The episode for this task was aired on February 13, 2022.
4. To determine the result of their weekly budget, they were given an hour to insert all of the flowers they have created and earned during the task given to Aleck, Basti, Kathleen, and Rica; they have successfully placed all of the flowers in the big broken heart in one hour, therefore giving them their weekly budget.
5. Basti and Jaye were in the house when the task was performed. The episode for this task was aired on February 19, 2022.
6. To get the average score of 90%, the Kumunity must drop at least 840,000 diamonds on Kumu to get 84% of their total score. Every 10,000 diamonds dropped is equivalent to 1% of their score. In total, the Kumunity had only dropped 233,700 diamonds.
7. Gin, Isabel, Kathleen, Roque, and Zach helped the other housemates' as another paramdam (feeling) in their weekly task. Since they have successfully transferred the pillars, they were given their weekly budget and were reunited with the other five housemates.
8. Raf and Laziz along with the houseplayers Marky and Ja were in the house when the task was performed. The episode for this task was aired on March 7, 2022, one day after the fifth eviction night.
9. At the end of the weekly task, the housemates have successfully transferred 940 balls; this was equivalent to ₱94,000. All of the proceeds will be donated to St. Arnold Janssen Kalinga Foundation, Inc., the said Kumunity beneficiary for the weekly task.

=== Other tasks ===
Task No.	Date given	Type	Task title and description	Participants	Result
Pre-House Tasks
1	January 2 (Day 79)	Reward task	Airplane Balancing Task; The housemates must line up and balance the plane's wing provided in the activity area for ten seconds. If the plane's wing is unbalanced, they must start again from the beginning. Once completed, all of the housemates will finally enter PBB Airlines.	All housemates	Passed
2	January 3 (Day 80)	Reward task	Turbulence; Just like riding an actual airplane, the housemates may experience turbulence at unexpected times while riding in PBB Airlines. This is represented by a turbulence sound that will be played by Big Brother. Instructed by the Final Five of the Celebrity Kumunity, Nathan or Captain Policarpio must shake a pair of two inter-connected bottles that are filled with marbles and must transfer it to the other side of the bottle by shaking it. On the other hand, the other housemates, including Raf, must wiggle their respective airplane helmets during the duration of the turbulence. They must do this until Nathan successfully transfers the marbles to the other side.	All housemates	Passed
3	January 4 (Day 81)	Special task	Babylandia Airport; For their first stop, the housemates had to layover to Babylandia Airport. From there, the housemates were greeted with garlands that has their baby pictures of them. They must wear their respective garlands and explain them to the housemates before they could finally ride again in PBB Airlines.	All housemates	Passed
4	January 5 (Day 82)	Reward task	Baggage Task; To gain access into the house, the housemates have to finish first an obstacle course while lined up altogether and must stack two boxes between them. They would have to start again if any of the boxes fall in the obstacle course. The housemates can then claim their baggages and finally enter the house altogether once they reach the finish line while keeping the boxes between them.	All housemates	Passed
House Tasks
5	January 7 (Day 84)	Secret reward task	Chosen by Kumu users through Kumunity Decides, Isabel was tasked to determine the two housemates that are hiding their real identity from each other. She chose Seham as her help in this task. At the end of the week, she chose Raf and Aleck, which in turn, have no relationship with each other. Nathan, on the other hand, revealed their secret weekly task and his real name afterwards. The reward for this secret task was never revealed as both Isabel and Seham failed in this task.	Isabel and Seham	Failed
6	January 12 (Day 89)	Reward task	Using their hips as their clues for their answers, the adult housemates must guess four correct answers each on the quizzes given by the three isolated housemates (Zach, Aleck, and Michael Ver). Successfully answering 10 or more of this quiz will reward them with extra materials for their second weekly task. The outcome of this reward task: No. / Question (translated from Filipino) / Response / Actual Answer / Outcome; For Zach: 1 / On what year did Zach move in to their house? / 2016 / 2016 / Correct; 2 / What is the color of the roof of Zach's house? / Green / Grey / Wrong; 3 / How many of Zach's siblings are left at his home? / 2 / 2 / Correct; 4 / What is the name of their dog in the photo? / Dutch / Gary / Wrong; For Aleck: 1 / What is the color of Aleck's gate? / Black / Black / Correct; 2 / What item did Aleck buy during the lockdown that was placed on the outside of their house? / Swimming pool / Swimming pool / Correct; 3 / What is the name of the thing Aleck parked on the front of the black gate? / Motorcycle / Motorcycle / Correct; 4 / On what day of the week does Aleck's family reunite at his home? / Sunday / Sunday / Correct; For Michael Ver: 1 / How old was Michael Ver when he lived in the house shown in the picture? / 6 / 6 / Correct; 2 / What are the many things that are outside Michael Ver's house that his mother also sells it? / Plants / Plants / Correct; 3 / How many family members does Michael Ver have in his house? / 10 / 10 / Correct; 4 / From where does Michael Ver live? / Isabel, Leyte / Isabel, Leyte / Correct	All housemates	Passed
7	January 18 (Day 95)	Special task	Big Brother's Supervisor; In preparation for the arrival of three other adult housemates, the current adult housemates must audition for the role of Big Brother's Supervisor. For the first part of the auditions, each of the housemates had two minutes to introduce themselves and say that why they must be picked as Big Brother's Supervisor. At the end of the first auditions, they chose Zach, Raf, Isabel, and Michael Ver as the four contenders for Big Brother's Supervisor. For the second and final auditions, each of the four contenders must lend their voices once again and must assign special tasks to their co-housemates to the confession room. Then, they must select one housemate that they wish to assign as Big Brother's Supervisor. In the end of the final auditions, decided through a game of rock paper scissors between Zach and Raf, Zach was officially assigned as Big Brother's Supervisor. Tasks given by the contenders: No. / Task (translated from Filipino) / Assigned by / Assigned to / Ref.; 1 / Seham must show her modeling skills by getting the bananas from the kitchen area and must hold it while striking a pose for two to three seconds in each of the four corners of the pool. / Isabel / Seham; 2 / Gin must get Raf's skirt in the girls' bedroom and must wash it in the garden area while singing. / Raf / Gin; 3 / Thamara must walk like a model while watering the plants (excluding the plants with white burns). / Zach / Thamara; 4 / Nathan must "fight" Laziz in the garden area using only his hand and foot for twenty seconds. / Michael Ver / Nathan	All housemates	Passed
8	January 19 (Day 96)	Secret task	After isolating from the housemates, Michael Ver and Aleck must sneak into the house secretly and arrange their respective beds without the housemates noticing them. If they are caught, the both of them will have to sleep on the floor.	Michael Ver, Aleck	Passed
9	January 20 (Day 97)	Special task	As Big Brother's Supervisor, Zach was given a big microphone by Big Brother to talk to the three newly entered housemates Jaye, Basti, and Rica. For the microphone to turn on, the housemates must form a human "cord" first and must insert the end of the cord on an on-air sign.	Zach	Passed
10	January 21 (Day 98)	Secret task	Chosen by Kumu users through Kumunity Decides, Isabel and Thamara must teach the dance steps that they have created and danced during their flight on PBB Airlines to the three new housemates (Basti, Jaye, and Rica) in connection to the third video for their third weekly task that were made by the new housemates. The two must not see the three new housemates while practicing, and the Supervisor (Zach) must not know that they are doing this task. If considered successful, the three new housemates will finally enter the house.	Isabel, Thamara	Passed
11	January 22 (Day 99)	Special task	The last three adult housemates that were the winners of Online Bahay ni Kuya (Andrei, Kathleen, and Roque), including houseguest Glenda, must step on a pathway of 8 pairs of "rocks". Every rock signifies if they can proceed to another rock (represented by a ding sound), or a consequence if not. They can only land on a rock once the plasma TV displays "proceed". A buzzer sound will be played if the last three housemates and Glenda stepped on a wrong rock, and will be given a consequence to all of them (including the housemates that are inside the House). The consequence given will be displayed on the plasma TV for them to proceed and will be provided by a ninja. If considered successful, the last three housemates, including Glenda, will officially enter the house. Consequences given: No. / Step given / Consequence (translated from Filipino); 1 / 2nd / All of them must drink a raw egg from a shot glass. Selected housemates: Isabel, Seham, Michael Ver, and Thamara; 2 / 3rd / All of them must drink an ampalaya shake. Selected housemates: Nathan, Raf, Gin, and Aleck; 3 / 5th / All of them must eat a sliced eye of a cow. Selected housemates: Jaye, Basti, Rica, and Zach; 4 / 6th / Andrei, Kathleen, Roque, and Glenda must crawl on a muddy rope course.; 4 / 6th / Selected housemates that are inside the house must be showered with mud. Selected housemates: Jaye, Laziz, Gin, and Thamara; 5 / 8th / Andrei, Kathleen, Roque, Glenda, and selected housemates that are inside the house must blow a bowl of flour to find a key and must get it using only their mouths. Selected housemates: Nathan, Rica, Aleck, and Michael Ver	All housemates and Glenda	Passed
12	January 23 (Day 100)	Special task	Laziz must teach his native culture to all of the housemates by rapping in Russian with the help of his fellow male housemates (excluding Roque and Andrei).	Laziz	Passed
13	January 24 (Day 101)	Secret task	In connection to their fourth weekly task, the winners of Online Bahay ni Kuya on Kumu, Andrei, Kathleen, and Roque were informed separately that they must be assigned as the boss of their company during the duration of the weekly task. Failing this secret task will give them an automatic nomination for the first nominations.	Kathleen	Passed
13	January 24 (Day 101)	Secret task	In connection to their fourth weekly task, the winners of Online Bahay ni Kuya on Kumu, Andrei, Kathleen, and Roque were informed separately that they must be assigned as the boss of their company during the duration of the weekly task. Failing this secret task will give them an automatic nomination for the first nominations.	Andrei and Roque	Failed
14	January 24 (Day 101)	Special secret task	Houseguest Glenda was tasked to convince a housemate of her choice to become the boss of their company. The housemates must not know that she is doing this task, and Glenda must not be elected as the boss of their company, as she is only a houseguest, and not an official housemate. Glenda's choice was Michael Ver; as a result, Michael Ver was elected as the first boss of the company; making her special secret task a success.	Glenda	Passed
15	January 29 (Day 106)	Special task	In connection to the birthday of Laziz's mother, as his close friend, Nathan and his fellow housemates must surprise Laziz after he is done talking with Big Brother in the confession room.	Nathan	Passed
16	February 1 (Day 109)	Secret task	Secret Messages; Basti was asked by Big Brother to send secret messages to Rica, in connection to his developing feelings for her. For Basti to create a secret message, Basti must go to the activity area and say "Rica, may tanong ako para sa'yo" (Rica, I have a question for you) and then say his question. Example: "Rica, may tanong ako para sa'yo. Kumain ka na ba?" (Rica, I have a question for you. Have you eaten?) The question will then be displayed on the plasma TV. He is given three questions every day to ask Rica secretly; this will go on for days until the time given by Big Brother that the housemates must guess the person who is sending those secret messages, and to whom is the secret sender sending the messages to. For this secret task to be successful, Rica and the other housemates (including houseguest Glenda) must not know that the questions displayed on the plasma TV are from Basti, that Basti is doing this task, and Rica must answer every question displayed on the plasma TV. Secret messages given by Basti to Rica: No. / Question (translated from Filipino) / Did Rica answer this question?; 1 / "Are you sad?" / Correct; 2 / "Do you like spaghetti?" / Correct; 3 / "Do you like Korean food?" / Correct; 4 / "Why did your 'M.U' (mutual understanding) hurt you before?" / Correct; 5 / "What are you looking for in a girlfriend/boyfriend?" / Correct; 6 / "If someone asked you to date, where would you like to go?" / Correct; 7 / "So your 'M.U' traded you (for a woman) farther?" / Correct; 8 / "So you want your man to be family oriented and strategic?" / Correct; 9 / "Can we meet tomorrow?" / Correct	Basti^{1}	Passed
17	February 6 (Day 114)	Secret task	KUPIDUO; A combination of the words "kupido" (Filipino word for Cupid) and duo, in preparation for the upcoming Valentine's Day, Seham and Zach were assigned and must dress as cupids. The both of them must help their fellow housemates in repairing their "broken hearts" through a series of tasks. The KupiDuo's missions: No. / Day given / Task / Participant(s) / Result; 1 / February 7 (Day 115) / Aleck, Basti, and Rica must fill a container in the garden area by swimming in the pool area while wearing their helmets that are attached with a shot glass with the help of the KupiDuos in filling the container by using the water in the pool. One second will be added to Rica's reward for every 1ml passed by the water in the container. They were given an hour to complete this task. Once completed, all of the seconds banked will go to a video message sent by Rica's step-mother to her that was seen by herself in a special room. The three collected 37ml out of a possible 100ml to collect in the container; this gave Rica 37 seconds to view a video message from her step-mother. / Aleck, Basti, Rica / Passed; 2 / February 9 (Day 117) / Nathan and Zach must connect a broken heart while going to a specified platform in the activity area while wearing bands. One minute will be added to Nathan's reward for every 12 minutes that they stay, connect and form each other's hearts in the platform. For their final round, Nathan must stay in the platform for one hour while still wearing the bands they wore earlier, and one minute will still be added to the reward for every 12 minutes passed, garnering a possible and additional 5 minutes for Nathan's reward, making a possible total of 11 minutes of time banked if they stayed for a whole hour. In conclusion, the pair gained 9 minutes for Nathan to talk and have a date with his wife in a special room. / Nathan, Zach / Passed; 3 / February 11 (Day 119) / Jaye, Isabel, and Seham must construct a picture of Jaye in the activity area by first, selecting two cards placed on separate tables that contains the same picture as the other card in the garden area, similar to a memory game. Once all cards are matched, they can go to the activity area, and Jaye must construct a picture of Basti (using the back portion of the cards from earlier) in a specified spot. They must do both of these tasks in one hour. A special reward was given to Jaye in regards to Basti with the connection to Jaye willing to sacrifice his place in the game for his sibling; if Basti was evicted in any eviction night starting from the second eviction night, Jaye would be evicted instead of Basti, but it all depends on Basti if he wants to trade places with his brother. / Jaye, Isabel, Seham / Passed	Seham and Zach	Passed
18	February 8 (Day 116)	Reward task	Birthday Rag Doll; Raf must dress, act, and pose like a Barbie doll in a box for 260 minutes (4 hours and 20 minutes). She can only be moved by her brother Nathan when Big Brother gives Nathan a signal on the plasma TV an assigned place, position, and a pose for the last 100 minutes to where he can place Raf to. Once completed, Raf will have a chance to talk to her parents in a special room for 100 seconds.	Raf	Passed
19	February 11 (Day 119)	Reward task	Aleck, Basti, Kathleen, and Rica must transfer 100 flowers from a designated spot up to the garden from where they placed their flowers in the activity area to a garden in one hour while both of the pairs are wearing heart costumes. Each pair must attach and place a flower to the garden using a garter. One flower placed into the garden is equivalent to double the flowers earned by the housemates. For the last 20 minutes of the said task, both of the pairs must be tied in each other's foot. In conclusion, 61 flowers were transferred by the pairs; therefore, the flowers earned by the housemates were then doubled to 122 flowers.	Aleck, Basti, Kathleen, and Rica	Passed
20	February 14 (Day 122)	Reward task	To get their needed supplies in decorating their gowns for their weekly task, all of the housemates must walk an elevated pathway while wearing high heels and wearing a costume similar to a chicken while holding and balancing the "eggs" in both of their hands. They must start again if one, many, or all of the "eggs" that they hold in their hands fall down or if they fall down while walking on the pathway.	All housemates	Passed
21	February 17 (Day 125)	Special task	Trading of Roses; The nominees (Basti, Gin, Jaye, Kathleen, and Zach) were tasked by Big Brother to trade and give their black rose that was given to them during the third nomination night into an actual rose to their fellow housemate of their choice and explain on why they gave that housemate their rose. Roses given by the nominees: No. / Nominee / Given to / Reason; 1 / Jaye / Isabel / Told Isabel that he has a crush on her.; 2 / Gin / Nathan / Talked to Nathan because they have not had a serious conversation.; 3 / Kathleen / Raf / To forgive her on their confrontation on the girls' bedroom that was shown yesterday.; 4 / Basti / Roque / Thanked Roque for being a friend and a brother.; 5 / Zach / Seham / Admitted that they liked each other (especially during their KupiDuo task).	Basti, Gin, Jaye, Kathleen, and Zach	Passed
22	February 22 (Day 130)	Secret task	Paramdam (English: Feelingly); As the fake-evictees of their Ligtask challenge, Gin, Isabel, Kathleen, Roque, and Zach were tasked by Big Brother to secretly sneak into the house and give hints to the housemates through a series of tasks. The other housemates must not know that they are inside the house. The Paramdam task result: No. / Task; 1 / All of them must sneak into the house and do general cleaning and prepare a meal for the housemates.; 2 / All of them were tasked to select the housemates that they think that are undeserving to be in the Top 2 by crossing out their pictures with red paint. Then, they must place the pictures in the living area.; 3 / All of them must help their fellow housemates in their weekly task by using their voices as their paramdam.; 4 / All of them must bang on the hallway door as their paramdam to the housemates.; 5 / All of them must use their voice as their final paramdam to the housemates by helping them in their weekly task.	Gin, Isabel, Kathleen, Roque, and Zach	Passed
23	February 23 (Day 131)	Special task	Ninja Feels; Gin, Isabel, Kathleen, Roque, and Zach were tasked to dress and act as ninjas. As ninjas, they must distribute the materials needed for their weekly task. The housemates must not know that they are the ninjas while they are inside the house. They were also tasked to assign four housemates (to be given in pairs) to give the materials needed and a housemate to instruct the other housemates in their weekly task. The housemates' assignments in Ninja Feels: Housemate / Task; Isabel / Tasked to distribute the rope needed in their weekly task.; Kathleen / Tasked to distribute the rope needed in their weekly task.; Gin / Tasked to distribute the blocks needed in their weekly task.; Roque / Tasked to distribute the blocks needed in their weekly task.; Zach / Tasked to instruct the housemates in their weekly task.	Gin, Isabel, Kathleen, Roque, and Zach	Passed
24	March 4 (Day 140)	Secret reward task	Birthday Sacrifice; Zach volunteered to sacrifice himself for the day in exchange for a reward for his birthday celebration; as per said by Big Brother himself and by their agreement with each other, Zach was tasked to do all of the household chores (e.g. washing the dishes and cleaning the house) for that day and must also clean the "teeths" of his fellow housemates by acting like a dentist. The housemates must not know the reason why he is doing this task. In exchange for Zach's sacrifice, Zach had a one-on-one drink with the housemates and the houseplayers in the garden area to celebrate his birthday inside the house.	Zach	Passed

Notes

Adults

1. On Basti's behalf, Jaye and Nathan helped give the 7th and 8th questions respectively.

== Challenges ==
=== Head of Household ===
Challenge No.	Date given	Challenge title and description	Head of Household
1	January 9 (Day 85)	Using a remote controller, each housemate must navigate a drone through an obstacle course consisting of a set of four hoops of varying sizes and heights, and of a tunnel. The housemate that can land their drone at the end point at the fastest time wins the challenge. Padaluck recipient: Isabel (decreased to three hoops)	Nathan
2	February 13 (Day 121)^{1}	Using any parts of their body (except for their hands), each housemate must transfer a ball through cylindrical obstacle course without falling it. If ever they fell a ball, they will go back to the starting point. The housemate with the fastest time to finish, wins the challenge.	Michael Ver

Notes

Adults

1. No Padaluck campaign was held on Kumu for this challenge—as of this date, the reason for this is still unknown. Zach was the first housemate to do this challenge as he was chosen by users through Kumunity Decides.

=== Ligtask ===
The Ligtask challenge was brought back specifically for this edition since it was last used on Connect.

Task No.	Date given	Challenge title and description	Participants	Saved
Adults
1	February 20 (Day 128)	To test their accuracy and luck, the housemates (except Nathan, Raf, and Seham) must shoot one of their assigned balls into two different sizes of round cylinders above a platform. The first five housemates to do this will be saved from eviction; while the remaining housemates who did not shoot their respective balls will be evicted.^{1}	Gin, Isabel, Kathleen, Laziz, Michael Ver, Roque, Zach	Laziz, Michael Ver^{2}
2	February 21 (Day 129)	Isabel, Kathleen, and Roque must balance and stack two blocks on each end of a pole while undergoing a maze. They must start again from the beginning of the maze if any of their stacked blocks fall down. They were given 30 minutes to complete this task.	Isabel, Kathleen, Roque	None^{3}

Notes

1. As part of a twist, the first two housemates to do this challenge will be saved instead of five.
2. Even though only Laziz and Michael Ver were saved from this eviction as per the announcement by Big Brother, Isabel, Kathleen, and Roque were also saved from eviction as they have also successfully shot their balls on the container as part of the original rules before the twist occurred.
3. The number of evictees for this task was never revealed as the three of them did not finish the challenge in time. Therefore, they were "evicted" from the house.

=== Group challenges ===
Challenge No.
Date given
Challenge title and description
Winner
Loser(s)
1
January 31
(Day 108)
Battle of the Duos
The housemates were informed that the house was split into two, it was also announced that the two pairs of leaders of their respective groups were related to each other; the two pairs of leaders being Raf and Nathan as Team Juane, and Basti and Jaye as Team Macaraan. The winning group at the end of this challenge will be given immunity; with the other group being the possible nominees for the second nominations.

To determine the members of each group, first, the remaining housemates will pick a random number from a bowl; the housemates who picked the first numbers will then select their pair. Then, in the activity area, the two pairs of leaders must inflate a balloon and then pass it to a basket by using their heads. The two housemates standing on a podium will then belong to the winning pair.

As the Macaraan Brothers have won the first three rounds, the remaining housemates (Isabel, Kathleen, Rica, Seham, Thamara, and Zach) were automatically assigned to Team Juane.

Teams:

- Team Juane: Raf and Nathan (captains), Isabel, Kathleen, Rica, Seham, Thamara, and Zach
- Team Macaraan: Basti and Jaye (captains), Andrei, Aleck, Gin, Laziz, Michael Ver, and Roque

The group challenges
Challenge No.	Date given	Challenge title and description	Team Juane	Team Macaraan
1	Feb. 2 (Day 110)	Home Along Da Riles (English: Home Along the Rails); In every group, four housemates in pairs of two must ride into a cart using only their body movement in order to move the cart. Once they reach into a row of keys, a housemate must get a key and a plunger to help them go back faster and unlock a lock from a box that has six locks that contains an immunity necklace. The two members of a pair will get a key separately, and then both of the pair will get another key together. The group who unlocks their respective box first wins this round.	Won	Lost
2	Feb. 3 (Day 111)	Goal Boal; Similar to the Paralympic sport goalball, while wearing safety gear and eyepatches, the remaining pair of each group that did not participate on the first challenge must catch the ball of the other pair with the first pair lying on the floor and the other pair standing. The pair standing must roll the ball into the floor, and the other pair must catch the ball using their hands. Points ranging from 2–3 points will be given to the standing pair if the other pair fails to catch the ball in one of the three areas of the other pairs' goal area. There will be two rounds that consists of two 10-minute half-times, for a total of 20 minutes for the pairs to play with. The group pair with the most points garnered during the game wins this round.	Lost	Won
Final score			16	20

The winner for the group challenge was in favor for Team Macaraan for winning the tiebreaker in the second challenge.

Jaye, Michael Ver, and Roque
Aleck, Basti, Gin, Laziz, and Team Juane
2
February 4–5
(Days 112–113)
Plot Twist
As a twist, Big Brother informed the members of Team Macaraan that they have not claimed their immunity yet. He then gave a plot-twisting challenge to determine the final winners of the Battle of the Duos, and to also finally determine the possible nominees for the second nominations.

To test their strategies, creativity, and patience, all of the members of Team Macaraan must stack a tower of blocks within 30 minutes. They were allowed to create the mechanics for their respective games against each other. At the end of all games, only four winners of their respective games against each other will then be given immunity for the second nominations, making the other four vulnerable for eviction.

The plot twist challenges created by the housemates
Challenge No.	Date given	Challenge title and description	Winners	Losers
1	Feb. 4 (Day 112)	For the Macaraan brothers, Basti and Jaye, must stack a tower of blocks on a table within 30 minutes. The person who has the highest height of stacked blocks will be immune for the nominations; the other will be vulnerable for the second nominations. Jaye automatically won this round due to Basti's tower falling down seconds before their timer ran up, making Jaye immune for the second nominations.	Jaye (automatically won)	Basti (automatically lost)
2	Feb. 4 (Day 112)	For Laziz and Michael Ver, they must run from a spot in the activity area and get their respective blocks using their hands to get blocks as they can carry. Then, once they have all the blocks they need, they can stack their blocks on the floor. The person who has the highest height of stacked blocks will be immune for the nominations; the other will be vulnerable for the second nominations.	Michael Ver (reached 5 feet)	Laziz (reached 4.6 feet)
3	Feb. 5 (Day 113)	For Andrei and Aleck, similar to the block game Jenga, they must take turns on stacking their blocks and removing a block in turns to stack the removed block of their choosing from the bottom to the top of the blocks. The person who makes the stacked blocks fall loses the game and loses immunity; making the opponent immune for the nominations. Due to Aleck making their stacked blocks fall down, he automatically lost their game; making Andrei the winner and made him immune for the nominations; making Aleck the possible nominee for the second nominations.	~~Andrei~~; ~~(automatically won)~~	Aleck (automatically lost)
4	Feb. 5 (Day 113)	For Gin and Roque, they must play a game of rock paper scissors first to determine who will play first. Then, the winner must first shoot a ball into a glass. The one who shoots three of their respective balls first will then stack their blocks; this will go on for three rounds until someone wins. Because Roque won all of the rounds, he automatically won his game and was immune for the nominations; making Gin vulnerable for eviction.	Roque (automatically won)	Gin (automatically lost)

At the end of the group challenge, only Andrei, Jaye, Michael Ver, and Roque of Team Macaraan have claimed immunity for the second nominations; leaving their fellow team members Aleck, Basti, Gin, and Laziz, along with the members of Team Juane vulnerable for eviction.

Although Andrei won his battle against Aleck, he was evicted prior to the second nomination night, which rendered his immunity void.

=== The Ten Million Diamonds Challenge ===
Challenge No.	Date given	Challenge title and description	Order of finish or rank				
Challenge No.	Date given	Challenge title and description	1st	2nd	3rd	4th	5th
1	March 6 (Day 142)	The Final Five must stand into a platform and must hold on that platform's handle for an indefinite amount of time by only holding their right hand into a stand that holds the gold bars which signifies the diamonds they'll get after the challenge. If a housemate either lifts their legs up while standing on the stand, holds the handle with both of their hands, or slips while standing, they will be eliminated from the challenge and won't get any diamonds. The last housemate standing will instantly get 10 million diamonds.	Isabel	Zach	Seham	Nathan	Michael Ver
2	March 9–10 (Days 145–146)	The Challengers; Big Brother informed the housemates that the other Final Five housemates have the chance to become the owner of the diamonds by battling the reigning diamond holder and have the diamonds to keep for himself/herself through a series of tasks. The said holder must protect his/her diamonds by winning the challenges given by Big Brother to defend his/her diamonds from the challengers. To determine a housemate to become a challenger, the housemates (except for the reigning diamond holder) must unlock a box that contains a challenger shirt from a box of identical keys that can be found in the pool area. They can only start once Big Brother gives his signal. The housemate that successfully unlocks the box will then become a challenger and can battle with the reigning diamond holder. If the reigning diamond holder wins the challenge, he/she will keep the diamonds until the next challenge; otherwise, if the challenger wins, he/she will take over as the reigning diamond holder and must protect it until someone beats him/her again in the next challenge/s until Big Brother stops the cycle. The last reigning diamond holder will keep the diamonds for himself/herself for the final eviction of their Kumunity, unless Big Brother says that the final holder must share a portion of his/her diamonds to the challengers/non-challengers. The challenges: Challenge No. / Date given / Challenge title and description / Challenged / Challenger; 1 / March 9 (Day 145) / Isabel and Zach must transfer balls from its starting position while inside a wire cage. This can be done by inserting their fingers into the wire to cross the ball to the top. After that, the ball needs to be dropped on the other side to roll it on a plank and be able to shoot the ball into a container. They have to go back to the beginning when the ball falls to the floor. The first to shoot four balls in the container will be the reigning diamond holder. / Isabel (only inserted 3 balls) / Zach; 2 / March 10 (Day 146) / Zach and Nathan must place four block pieces from their respective build areas which they must balance it while holding a rope. They must stack all of the four blocks to make a tower. If the stacked blocks fall, they must return all their blocks to their starting point and must start again. The housemate that builds their tower first wins and will be the final owner of the diamonds. / Zach / Nathan; After two rounds, Nathan was crowned as the final owner of the remaining diamonds; in total, the diamonds he got was 6 million diamonds. This was equivalent to 240 gold bars after the remaining 160 gold bars (equivalent to 4 million diamonds) were secretly stolen by a ninja.					
3	March 11 (Day 147)	Take Back; To retrieve the missing four million diamonds that were stolen by a ninja, Isabel, Michael Ver, Seham, and Zach must transfer a ball from a hanging maze that is engraved with the show's eye logo. The housemates can transfer two balls: each colored ball transferred has an assigned point. One point will be counted for a blue ball; while a red ball counts for five points. The housemates can do this in turns and must gather as much points as they can within six hours. They must start again from the beginning and wait for their turn if ever a ball falls to the ground or hits the maze. The housemate that gathers the most points after six hours will own the remaining four million diamonds. Final results: Housemate / Isabel / Michael Ver / Seham / Zach; Points garnered; Points garnered / 8 / 16 / 16 / 31					

=== Final Five spot challenges ===
Challenge No.	Date given	Challenge title and description	Winner/s	Dethroned/Loser(s)
1	March 2 (Day 138)	The participants must roll a ball from the starting point and then catch it at the end of the track or pathway. They should catch it at the end and must return immediately to the starting point to repeat the process again. If they do not catch the ball in the end point, they will be eliminated from the game. This will be represented by a ding sound and all housemates must stop the game at that point. After the first round, the ball they need to roll will increase from the starting point but they must first roll all the balls in that round before they can catch the first ball they rolled. Only one ball at a time can be caught at the end to be returned and rolled again at the starting point. This will go on for five rounds until there are two persons left at the last round of the game. The last man standing will get the third spot in the Final Five and will be immediately given immunity for the next nominations, while the remaining housemates will be given an automatic nomination. Final ranking: 1st / 2nd / 3rd / 4th / 5th / 6th / 7th; Seham / Isabel / Raf / Laziz / Zach / Jannene / Marky; Michael Ver and Nathan were exempt from participating as they have already claimed the first two spots of the Final Five of their Kumunity.	Seham	Isabel, Jannene, Laziz, Marky, Raf, Seham, Zach

== Nomination history ==
In each standard nomination round, every housemate is called to the confession room to nominate two of their housemates for eviction with the first nominee receiving 2 points and the other receiving 1 point. The housemates with the most nomination points (usually 3) will then face the public vote to determine the evictee for that round. However, Big Brother may automatically nominate a housemate for rule violations or a failure in a task. On the other hand, immunity may be awarded as a reward for accomplishing a task. Big Brother may forcibly evict a housemate for severe violations and a housemate may opt to voluntarily leave the house. In certain circumstances, the nomination process may be delayed as a result of a pending challenge or task.

	No. 1	No. 2	No. 3	No. 4	No. 5	No. 6	Top 2	Nominations Received
Eviction Day and Date	Day 112 Feb. 5	Day 119 Feb. 12	Day 126 Feb. 19	Day 133 Feb. 26	Day 141 Mar. 6	Day 147 Mar. 12		Nominations Received
Nomination Day and Date	Day 106; Jan. 30	Day 113; Feb. 6	Day 120; Feb. 13	Day 127; Feb. 20	Day 134; Feb. 27	Day 142; Mar. 7	–	Nominations Received
Isabel	Laziz; Aleck	Aleck; Rica	Kathleen; Raf	Roque; Zach	No nominations	No nominations	Adult Top 2 (Exited; Day 147)	10 (+1)
Nathan	Thamara; Aleck	Aleck; Rica	Seham; Jaye	Zach; Seham	No nominations	No nominations	Adult Top 2 (Exited; Day 147)	4
Zach	Isabel; Raf	Nathan; Aleck	Nathan; Gin	Isabel; Roque	No nominations	No nominations	Evicted (Day 147)	14 (+1)
Michael Ver	Gin; Thamara	Kathleen; Gin	Kathleen; Zach	Kathleen; Laziz	No nominations	No nominations	Evicted (Day 147)	9
Seham	Jaye; Basti	Kathleen; Raf	Gin; Basti	Zach; Isabel	No nominations	No nominations	Evicted (Day 147)	5
Raf	Thamara; Aleck	Aleck; Basti	Basti; Zach	Michael Ver; Kathleen	No nominations	Evicted (Day 141)		6 (+1)
Laziz	Isabel; Thamara	Aleck; Basti	Zach; Seham	Michael Ver; Kathleen	No nominations	Evicted (Day 141)		13 (+1)
Roque	Laziz; Basti	Rica; Aleck	Jaye; Laziz	Isabel; Zach	Evicted (Day 133)			3 (+1)
Gin	Basti; Laziz	Aleck; Kathleen	Jaye; Basti	Michael Ver; Kathleen	Evicted (Day 133)			12
Kathleen	Jaye; Rica	Basti; Aleck	Basti; Laziz	Michael Ver; Gin	Evicted (Day 133)			24
Basti	Thamara; Seham	Kathleen; Gin	Kathleen; Gin	Evicted (Day 126)				14
Jaye	Thamara; Zach	Kathleen; Laziz	Kathleen; Raf	Evicted (Day 126)				11
Aleck	Gin; Zach	Kathleen; Gin	Evicted (Day 119)					16
Rica	Raf; Laziz	Zach; Laziz	Evicted (Day 119)					5
Andrei	Laziz; Isabel	Evicted (Day 112)						0 (+1)
Thamara	Jaye; Michael Ver	Evicted (Day 112)						10
Notes	^{1,} ^{2,} ^{3}	^{3,} ^{4}	^{3,} ^{5}	^{6,} ^{7,} ^{8,} ^{9}	^{3,} ^{10,} ^{11,} ^{12,} ^{13}	^{None}		
Head of Household	Nathan	None	Michael Ver	None		Challenge Score + Open Voting		
Ligtask Winners	None			Laziz; Michael Ver	None	Challenge Score + Open Voting		
Up for eviction	Andrei; Roque; Thamara	Aleck; Basti; Kathleen; Rica	Basti; Gin; Jaye; Kathleen; Zach	Gin; Isabel; Kathleen; Roque; Zach	Isabel; Laziz; Raf; Zach	Challenge Score + Open Voting		
Saved from eviction	Roque; 20.88%	Basti; 19.06% Kathleen; 11.75%	Zach; 16.88% Kathleen; 12.53% Gin; 11.37%	Isabel; 45.87% Zach; 24.23%	Isabel; 52.21% Zach; 26.68%	Isabel; 29.56% Nathan; 20.93%		
Evicted	Andrei; 18.69% Thamara; 9.36%	Aleck; 5.02% Rica; 4.55%	Basti; 10.07% Jaye; 2.00%	Roque; 7.63% Gin; 5.86% Kathleen; 3.40%	Raf; 6.17% Laziz; 4.42%	Zach; 19.43% Michael Ver; 6.83% Seham; 2.35%		
References								

Legend
Housemate received immunity after becoming a Head of Household.
Housemate received immunity after winning or finishing a task or challenge; or was exempt from the nominations due to being a new entrant.
Housemate received immunity after winning the Ligtask challenge.
Housemate was automatically nominated as a result of a twist or a rule violation.

Notes

1. For being elected as the last boss of their company for their weekly task, Kathleen was awarded immunity for this eviction.
2. As both Andrei and Roque failed to be elected as the boss of their company, thus failing in their weekly task resulting in their automatic nominations. Since there are two housemates that were both automatically nominated, only the highest-pointer will be included from the list of nominees for this week.
3. This eviction is a double eviction wherein two nominees are set to be evicted.
4. Andrei, Jaye, Michael Ver, and Roque won immunity after winning the twist given by Big Brother as part of the Battle of the Duos challenge. As nominees from the prior nominations, Andrei and Roque may only be safe for this round of nominations if they were to be saved in the first eviction night.
5. Isabel used her Nomination Immunity Pass for this round, giving her immunity for this week.
6. For this week, the housemates had a face to face nomination unlike the previous nomination rounds.
7. This nomination round was divided into two groups; Team GinWin and Team RoQueens from the PBB Drag Race weekly task. Each housemate must be nominate a fellow member of their team.
8. Nathan used his Nomination Immunity Pass for this round, giving him immunity for this week.
9. This eviction is a triple eviction wherein three nominees are set to be evicted.
10. Since almost all of them had left during the special nomination process, as the housemates that still stayed in the activity area after Big Brother announced his offer, Michael Ver and Nathan claimed the first two spots of the Final Five.
11. Even though there was a special nomination process in this round of nominations, all nominations given there were declared void.
12. Seham was exempt for this eviction after she claimed the third Final Five spot.
13. Isabel, Laziz, Raf, and Zach were given an automatic nomination after they failed to claim the third spot of the Final Five that was based on the task given to them by Big Brother.

=== Powers ===
On Day 93, Nathan and Raf were awarded one Nomination Immunity Pass as a reward for succeeding in their secret weekly task with the siblings themselves deciding whom between the two will receive the pass. They chose to give the pass to Nathan. Nathan used his power on the fourth round of nominations, guaranteeing him another week in the house by giving himself immunity.

On Day 113, Isabel was also awarded one Nomination Immunity Pass for having the most number of followers among her fellow housemates during their Follower Sprint task that was held from January 22 to February 4, 2022. Isabel used her power on the third round of nominations, guaranteeing her another week in the house by giving herself immunity.

=== Special nomination process ===
A special nomination process occurred on Day 134, which was a deviation from the regular nominations in the confession room and from the normal face-to-face nominations.

For each housemate to nominate their fellow housemate for eviction, the housemate must nominate another housemate and then explain their reason why they nominated such housemate. Then, the housemate must place their picture into a holder that has a number of nomination points displayed on it. For the nomination to be considered valid, the housemate must need to bounce a ball from the six platforms provided to a container that depends on the number of nomination points that can be found below the platform. The housemate will then do the same task for the other point. Once the nominating housemate has successfully placed a ball in one or all of the containers, the nominated housemate will be given the nomination point assigned; a necklace bearing the point received will also be worn by the nominated housemate. If a housemate fails to place a ball in one or both of the containers on a round, the housemate must repeat the process again until all the balls in the container will be used. The two (or more of there is a tie) highest pointers after three rounds or more until it is determined will then be considered as the final nominees for eviction.

On the second round, Big Brother noticed that they were not taking the task seriously; so, he made an offer to the housemates: to either stay in the Activity Area if they want to proceed to the next round, or leave if they don't want to. This offer tested the housemates' authenticity towards their fellow housemates.

As the housemates that remained in the Activity Area after Big Brother announced his offer to the housemates, Nathan and Michael Ver secured their spots on the Final Five of their Kumunity.

Housemate	Rounds			Nominations Received
Housemate	1	2	3	Nominations Received
Isabel	Laziz; Zach	Left Activity Area		0
Laziz	Isabel; Nathan	Left Activity Area		1
Michael Ver	Raf; Zach	Raf; Zach	Raf; Zach	4
Seham	Laziz; Isabel	Left Activity Area		0
Zach	Michael Ver; Nathan	Left Activity Area		0
Raf	Michael Ver; Zach	Left Activity Area		2
Nathan	Michael Ver; Laziz	Michael Ver	Finished	0

Legend
Housemate became part of the Final Five of their Kumunity.
Housemate has finished shooting all of the balls in all of the containers and made their nominations valid.
Housemate failed to shoot a ball in all of the containers in that round and made their nominations invalid.

For housemates that only placed one ball during a round:
Green name name means that a ball was placed in the housemates' chosen container, making their nomination valid.
Red name means that no ball was placed in the housemates' chosen container, making their nomination invalid.

== Kumunity beneficiaries ==
- Isang Daan sa Pagtutulungan — The adult housemates, while doing The Big Online 10-dahan weekly task, will have to sell their products as proceeds from the sale will be donated to ABS-CBN Foundation through Tulong-Tulong sa Pag-ahon: Operation Odette, as part of Isang Daan sa Pagtutulungan, a 100-day series of fundraising activities initiated by ABS-CBN and ABS-CBN Foundation aimed at helping 100,000 families affected by Typhoon Odette. As of February 4, 2022, the housemates collected two hundred forty-nine thousand pesos (₱249,000) to be given to this Kumunity, as announced by main host Bianca Gonzalez during the first eviction night.
- St. Arnold Janssen Kalinga Foundation, Inc. – At Big Brother's request, the adult housemates were asked to think of ideas of which beneficiary they can help. After a round of discussions, they decided to help a particular Kumunity focusing on the impoverished and the homeless; however, they let Big Brother select such beneficiary as they do not know what particular charitable organization focuses on the aforementioned concerns. A day after, Big Brother announced to the adult housemates that the St. Arnold Janssen Kalinga Foundation, Inc. is their next Kumunity in need. A weekly task and charity task was given to Nathan and Michael Ver where the housemates must step on a color-coded part on the floor chosen by a digital roulette, and must use a paddle to pass a ball to another housemate to a container provided in the play area. One hundred pesos (₱100) will be added for every ball inserted in the container. They can shoot a maximum of 1,000 balls for this weekly task, possibly giving one hundred thousand pesos (₱100,000) if they shoot all of the balls to the chosen charity. In the end, the housemates successfully completed their task after shooting 940 balls, giving the housemates the opportunity to give ninety-four thousand pesos (₱94,000) to this Kumunity.

== S-E voting system result ==
Eviction No.	Nominee	Votes			Result	Refs.
Eviction No.	Nominee	To-Save	To-Evict	Net Total	Result	Refs.
1	Andrei	30.89%	−12.20%	18.69%	Evicted	
1	Roque	32.11%	−11.23%	20.88%	Saved	
1	Thamara	11.47%	−2.11%	9.36%	Evicted	
2	Aleck	10.98%	−5.96%	5.02%	Evicted	
2	Basti	19.65%	−0.59%	19.06%	Saved	
2	Kathleen	30.53%	−18.78%	11.75%	Saved	
2	Rica	19.15%	−14.60%	4.55%	Evicted	
3	Basti	19.36%	−9.29%	10.07%	Evicted	
3	Gin	20.05%	−8.68%	11.37%	Saved	
3	Jaye	2.26%	−0.26%	2.00%	Evicted	
3	Kathleen	17.64%	−5.11%	12.53%	Saved	
3	Zach	17.12%	−0.24%	16.88%	Saved	
4	Gin	6.59%	−0.73%	5.86%	Evicted	
4	Isabel	46.08%	−0.21%	45.87%	Saved	
4	Kathleen	6.51%	−3.11%	3.40%	Evicted	
4	Roque	8.35%	−0.72%	7.63%	Evicted	
4	Zach	25.96%	−1.73%	24.23%	Saved	
5	Isabel	52.40%	−0.19%	52.21%	Saved	
5	Laziz	4.58%	−0.16%	4.42%	Evicted	
5	Raf	9.68%	−3.51%	6.17%	Evicted	
5	Zach	28.08%	−1.40%	26.68%	Saved	
6	Isabel	29.65%	−0.09%	29.56%	Finalist	
6	Michael Ver	9.16%	−2.33%	6.83%	Evicted	
6	Nathan	24.27%	−3.34%	20.93%	Finalist	
6	Seham	2.52%	−0.17%	2.35%	Evicted	
6	Zach	23.95%	−4.52%	19.43%	Evicted	

== Controversies and criticisms ==
=== Inappropriate remarks ===
Michael Ver Comaling received heavy backlash from viewers for allegedly talking about the Juane siblings, Nathan and Raf, behind their backs in a bad manner to fellow housemate Laziz Rustamov, who is a close friend of the said siblings and was uncomfortable with Comaling's actions towards them. Comaling told Rustamov that he gave Raf 2 points as an act of vengeance since she had given him 2 points during the last two nominations, while he also questioned Nathan's religiousness, using it to "hide things".

=== Michael Ver-Seham-Zach love triangle ===
In the final three weeks of the edition, a love triangle emerged between Michael Ver Comaling, Seham Daghlas, and Zach Guerrero. Daghlas admitted her feelings towards Guerrero while also admitting her feelings towards Comaling a few days after, causing her to get backlash online, as she began favoring Comaling over Guerrero in the final 3 weeks of the edition, such as a scene where Daghlas got drunk on Guerrero's birthday celebration but asked for Comaling's help, and talking to Comaling after she had a "heart-to-heart" conversation with Guerrero that Comaling was seen eavesdropping on. The love triangle caused both Comaling and Daghlas, especially the latter, to decline in favorability from the viewers.
