= Pinoy Big Brother: Kumunity Season 10 – Teen Edition =

Pinoy Big Brother: Kumunity Season 10 Teen Edition
- Season 10
- Hosted by: Bianca Gonzalez; Robi Domingo
- No. of days: 63
- No. of housemates: 17
- Top 2: Gabb Skribikin; Rob Blackburn
- Companion show: Kumulitan, Kumunity: G sa Gabi, and Kumulitan Weekends (online via Kumu)

Release
- Original network: Kapamilya Channel
- Original release: March 13 – May 14, 2022

Season chronology
- ← Previous; Kumunity Season 10: Adult Edition (In season) Next → Gen 11

The teen edition of Pinoy Big Brother: Kumunity Season 10 premiered on Kapamilya Channel, Jeepney TV and A2Z on March 13, 2022. The third edition in the multi-part season, this edition featured contestants (known as Housemates) from the Teen Kumunity, which composes of civilians aged fifteen through nineteen.

The edition concluded on May 14, 2022 after 63 days. Rob Blackburn and Gabb Skribikin emerged as the Teen Top 2, advancing to the final part of the season.

== Production ==
=== Housemate selection ===
Just like the previous edition, online auditions were also held for this edition. It was initially scheduled to open on December 1, 2021, but was moved to November 6 during the Celebrity Edition's first eviction episode as an early Christmas treat to the show's teenage viewers.

=== Online Bahay ni Kuya ===
Unlike the previous edition that had three winners, only one spot was given to the aspiring teen housemates that auditioned online via Kumu. The Online Bahay ni Kuya Kumu campaign was held from March 11–12, 2022 where John Paolo Alcantara emerged as the winner of the campaign and therefore was declared an official teen housemate.

== Overview ==
=== Title card change ===
A new title card was included in both this edition and the preceding edition. On the back is a blue neon-colored house with the seasons' logo on the front, now displaying the words "Teen Edition" on the bottom of the seasons' logo. This was the only edition to display the editions' name to differentiate it from the other editions. Additionally, the entire title card for this edition has a neon summer background.

=== The House ===
The interiors of the houses were largely left alone, much like the previous edition. The only difference was that instead of showing Pinoy Ako, some of the neon lightings now display some of the lines of the edition's theme song, Kabataang Pinoy performed by BINI and SB19.

=== Theme songs ===
The theme song for this edition came in two different versions; one was performed by the independent musical group Nameless Kids and was solely intended for promotional use. The latter was abandoned in favor of SB19 and BINI working together on the same theme song.

The eviction theme song for this edition is entitled Dalampasigan by celebrity housemate and finalist Anji Salvacion.

=== Twists ===
- Outside World Destination — Last used in Otso, instead of entering the House immediately, the Teen housemates were sent into a remote location up in the mountains and were divided into two groups. They must complete a series of tasks and challenges given by Big Brother to grant them access into the House.
- K.E.A (Kuya's Executive Assistant) — During the Teen Edition, Big Brother announced to his teen housemates that he'll leave the house temporarily for an undisclosed reason. In connection to this, he introduced his savvy virtual assistant named K.E.A (short for Kuya's Executive Assistant) that the housemates can communicate with her on a separate room. Unbeknownst to the Teen housemates, K.E.A was "hacked" by a scammer by catfishing the housemates. This gave them and the viewers a valuable lesson regarding social media fraud.
- Kuya's Task Master — Similar to Kuya's Christmas Elf, the Teen Edition featured a task master in which the winner of this campaign on Kumu will distribute tasks and messages in behalf of Big Brother virtually or in person. Hiroshi Aruelo won this campaign and appeared virtually on May 5 to explain the Plate Balancing weekly task.
- The Ten Million Diamonds Group Challenge — This edition featured the Teen housemates competing against a group of Teen houseplayers to get a portion of the ten million diamonds on two group challenges.

== Housemates ==
The edition's first three housemates were introduced at the show's online companion show, PBB Kumulitan, on March 7, 2022. The rest of the housemates were introduced in pairs throughout the rest of the week. The final two housemates —Paolo Alcantara, the winner of the last Online Bahay ni Kuya campaign and Stephanie Jordan were revealed nine days later on March 16.

Name	Age on Entry	Hometown	Occupation	Day entered	Day exited	Status	Refs.
Rob Blackburn	19	Laguna	Traveler	Day 154	—^{1}	Teen Top 2	—
Gabb Skribikin	19	Pasig	Idol performer	Day 154	—^{1}	Teen Top 2	—
Stephanie Jordan	16	Cebu	Singer	Day 155	Day 210	Evicted^{2}	
Maxine Trinidad	18	Davao City	Influencer and athlete	Day 154	Day 210	Evicted^{2}	
Paolo Alcantara	15	Nueva Ecija	Influencer	Day 155	Day 210	Evicted	—
Tiff Ronato	19	Northern Samar	Accountancy student	Day 154	Day 204	Evicted	—
Dustine Mayores	19	Marikina	Streamer and model	Day 154	Day 204	Evicted	—
Eslam El Gohari	17	Makati	Model	Day 154	Day 197	Evicted	—
Luke Alford	17	Batangas	Actor and singer	Day 154	Day 197	Evicted	—
Ashton Salvador	18	Quezon City	Actor and model	Day 154	Day 190	Evicted	
Stef Draper	15	Parañaque	Student-athlete	Day 154	Day 183	Evicted	—
Kai Espenido	18	Surigao del Norte	Surfer and model	Day 154	Day 176	Evicted	
Don Hilario	19	Laguna	Vlogger	Day 154	Day 169	Evicted	—

Notes

1. Gabb and Rob did not leave the house when they were declared as the Top Two winners. They were then joined by the Kumunity Top Twos and the wildcard housemates the next day.
2. Stephanie and Maxine did not completely leave the house due to the wildcard housemates twist announced to them by Big Brother, but they were still considered as the last two evictees of the edition. They would return to the house and compete as individual wildcard housemates for a spot at the Biga-10 housemates.

== Houseplayers ==
Turning over from the previous edition, another campaign for the Teen Edition was held on April 2 until April 8, 2022. Out of the top ten diamond earners, only three of them will be selected as the official houseplayers for the Teen Edition—they will play as a group to challenge the housemates through a series of tasks given by Big Brother. The seven unchosen earners will instead have their respective co-host slots in PBB Kumulitan and will receive exclusive merch from Kumu. They will also undergo screening first with the production team of the show similar to the previous edition's campaign.

David Charles Longinotti, Erica Dimaculangan, and Lyanna Ong Fontanilla were selected to become the teen houseplayers for the Teen edition. They were first introduced on PBB Kumulitan during the sixth live eviction night on May 8 before the three of them entered the house the next day.

With the houseplayers successfully stealing the housemates' 7 million diamonds out of the possible 10 in the Ten Million Diamonds Group Challenge, they have proved that teamwork, determination, and patience is the key when it comes to Big Brother's tasks.

All of them have formed friendships with the Teen housemates almost immediately after the "camp masters" (what the housemates called them during the time of their stay) revealed their true status to the Teen housemates on Day 209. They exited the house minutes after their announcement after a short bonding with each other.

List of Pinoy Big Brother: Kumunity Season 10 teen houseplayers
Name	Age on Entry	Hometown	Occupation	Day entered	Day exited	Status
Yanna Fontanilla	19	Baguio	Student-athlete	Day 205	Day 209	Exited
David Charles Longinotti	18	Nueva Vizcaya	Streamer	Day 205	Day 209	Exited
Ika Dimaculangan	19	Laguna	Online seller and streamer	Day 205	Day 209	Exited

=== Campaign results ===
Houseplayer campaign results for Teen Edition
Rank	Name	Diamonds earned (in millions)	Result
1	Jana Indanan	4.31	Not selected
2	Zed Anda	4.30	Not selected
3	Erica Dimaculangan	4.26	Selected
4	Kimberly Cryztal Jaucian	4.21	Not selected
5	David Charles Longinotti	3.49	Selected
6	Miguel Luis Arrieta	3.04	Not selected
7	Darlyn Villanueva	2.99	Not selected
8	Alyanna Fontanilla	2.98	Selected
9	Venize Villadolid	2.50	Not selected
10	Kriziah Torrefiel	2.49	Not selected

== Houseguests ==
=== Online Guesting ===
- Day 178: John Bradley "Jan-Jan" Ronato, Tiff's autistic brother, got to spend time with Tiff and the housemates through Zoom in occupational therapy and mathematics sessions as part of her sacrifice task.
- Day 184: As a response to the widely criticized History Quiz Bee, historian Xiao Chua was invited to help Big Brother in re-educating the housemates in learning Philippine history as part of their History Week task.
- Day 196: Lilibeth and Simon Alford, Luke's parents, appeared virtually on Zoom to have a talk with Luke in the confession room, especially to his father that he had not been seen for 11 years.
- Day 202: Hiroshi Aruelo, the winner of Kuya's Task Master campaign on Kumu, appeared virtually to explain the Plate Balancing weekly task to the Teen housemates.
- Day 204: Paz Blackburn and Nelflor Jordan, Rob and Stephanie's respective mothers, appeared virtually to have one-on-one chat with Rob and Stephanie as a reward for completing the How Well Do You Know Each Other task.

=== Physical Guesting ===
- Day 178: Paz Blackburn and Ana Marie Lim, Rob and Ashton's respective mothers, were invited inside as they were to see Rob and Ashton separately as part of their secret tasks. Prior to this, the mothers were given a task and helped Eslam and Stef in their secret task for the two boys. Rob was able to spend time with Paz with a fine dining dinner date, while Ashton had the same with Ana Marie with a picnic table date.
- Day 186: JC Alcantara entered the house to perform tasks with Tour Group members before reuniting with brother Paolo in the Museum Group. Bonifacio "Tatay Dennis" Alcantara, Paolo's father, joined JC and the Tour Group as they enter the Museo ni Kuya witnessing the Museum Group recreate Paolo's family picture in their human diorama challenge with JC joining in, and reunite with Paolo for a brief period.
- Day 194: P-pop groups MNL48 (Coleen, Ella, and Jem) and SB19 entered the house as mentors to teach the housemates in singing and dancing choreography in preparation for the upcoming The Big KumuniTEEN Summer Concert weekly task. SB19 would go on to stay inside the house and be with the housemates in the coming days until the time of their concert, while MNL48 exited the house the same day after their entrance.
- Day 196: Elizabeth El Gohari, Eslam's mother, entered the house to celebrate Eslam's birthday celebration and reunited with him along with the other housemates and SB19 for a brief period of time.
- Day 204: Evelyn Alcantara, Flora Mae Trinidad, Jessica Ronato, Marianne Mayores, and Rosalinda Skribikin, the respective mothers of Paolo, Maxine, Tiff, Dustine, and Gabb, entered the house to help the housemates in cleaning the house while wearing PPEs before eventually reuniting with the housemates to celebrate Mother's Day inside the house.

== Tasks ==
=== Weekly tasks ===
Task No.	Date given	Task title and description	Result
1	March 14 (Day 150)	Star Hunt; While staying in the camp, all of the housemates in both groups must find ten stars that represent the first ten main seasons of the show in order to have a weekly budget and to successfully enter in the House through a series of tasks given by Big Brother. They were given separate tasks for the groups to find out.^{1} Teams: Camp Masagana: Dustine, Eslam, Gabb, Maxine, and Rob; Camp Matiyaga: Ashton, Don, Kai, Luke, Stef, and Tiff; The tasks given: Task No. / Date given / Challenge task and description / Result; Camp Tasks: 1 / March 14 (Day 150) / Shooting Task; The team must gather 100 water balloons that are scattered on the play area. Then, they must hit 10 poles that are represented by the kinds of foods that they need to eat in the camp (e.g. fish, beef, and pork). The poles that they can take down after all of the water balloons have been used will only be the foods that they will eat. A star will be given for every five poles that they have taken down. / Passed (took down 7 poles and gained one star); 2 / March 15 (Day 151) / Fishing Task; The team must undergo fishing on a pond located just beyond their camp. First, each member of the team must find 3 worms as their fish bait. Once completed, they can then find the five fishing rods scattered throughout the area. To succeed, the team must collect 10 fishes in a span of 10 minutes. A star will be given for every five fish caught. / Passed (caught 9 fishes and gained one star); 3 / March 16 (Day 152) / Find the Key; Both of the camps must unlock a box that has ten locks by finding its keys that are hanging in the various trees found in the forest. Each key is represented with an emoji that corresponds to a pre-determined sequence of keys. Each camp must find the correct emoji to find the correct key to successfully unlock a lock. One housemate must be assigned as a spotter from each camp to find the correct bag of keys by using binoculars. A star will be given for every five locks that they unlock. Both of the camps were given 30 minutes to complete the task. / Passed (gained two stars); 4 / March 18 (Day 154) / Both of the groups must undergo an obstacle course while carrying a housemate that will remove the three sacks that are hanging on a pole that contains the puzzle pieces that they must assemble in the center of the course. Once the three sacks have been removed, the group can then start assembling the puzzle pieces that resembles the show's eye logo. They were given 100 minutes to complete the task—the unused time by the first group will be used by the second group. Once completed, the housemates will be given three stars. / Passed (gained three stars and was completed by Camp Matiyaga); Joint Tasks: 5 / March 19 (Day 155) / All of the housemates must line up and must hold a balloon on their chests while walking on a star-shaped pathway. The first housemate in line must balance a ball using a balancing device. The housemates must place three balls in three poles once they reach to the center of the star. If the ball or the balloon falls, they must start again from the beginning. Every ball placed in a pole is equal to one star. The housemates must complete this in 30 minutes. If they complete this task, they will earn their weekly budget and will earn three stars; otherwise, if they fail this, they will lose their weekly budget. / Failed (only placed two balls and gained two stars)	Failed
2	March 21 (Day 157)	Basketball Dance; The housemates must create a basketball choreography wherein they will perform a dance and use a basketball at the same time. They must be able to perform five basketball tricks on their final performance. They are only allowed to make three mistakes.^{2,} ^{3}	Failed
3	March 29 (Day 165)	Body Photo Mosaic Making; The housemates must successfully mimic an image through a photo mosaic with 324 pieces of different photographs. That is, when the photos they are taking are set aside, can be successfully seen and correct. They can use any parts of their body to put and color them to help with the image that needs to be formed.^{4}	Passed
4	April 4 (Day 171)	PBB University; Served as both a weekly task and a group challenge, the housemates were divided into two groups. They must compete with each other through tasks or "examinations" on different subjects that are taught at schools such as Language and Science. The housemates in both groups must successfully create a boat made from different sizes of water bottles. Their boats must not sink and must hold multiple people when tested. If both groups are successful, they will be given their weekly budget, otherwise, if only one of the groups succeed, they will be given half of the budget, or none if both of the groups failed to successfully create a boat. They were given one week to complete this task. See Group challenges for more information about this task. Teams: Team Dustine: Dustine (leader), Kai, Paolo, Rob, Stef, and Stephanie; Team Luke: Luke (leader), Ashton, Eslam, Gabb, Maxine, and Tiff	Passed
5	April 10 (Day 177)	Tree of Sacrifice; Using the big rocks that they have written earlier, the housemates must carry all of their rocks altogether on a tree for the entire week. Only six housemates at a time can carry the tree and they have an assigned carrying time; they must carry the tree for ten minutes each without attempting to lower the tree. They can only start when Big Brother gives them his signal. They are only allowed to make three attempts to lower the tree for the entire duration of this task.^{5}	Passed
6	April 18 (Day 185)	Past is Past; As a response to the widely criticized History Quiz Bee, the housemates were divided into two groups that was determined through its counterpart as a Head of Household challenge, the housemates in both groups must earn a "passing grade" of 15 out of 20 correct answers from two examinations; a surprise midterm and a final examination that will be given by Big Brother during the duration of the weekly task. Teams: Tour Group: Tiff (leader), Dustine, Gabb, Luke, and Maxine; Museum Group: Eslam (leader), Ashton, Paolo, Rob, and Stephanie; The tasks given on Past is Past: Task No. / Date given / Challenge task and description / Result; 1 / April 18 (Day 185) / Live Human Diorama; The Museum Group were tasked by Big Brother to create 5 live human dioramas in the living area (and in the pool area for the fifth diorama) and must re-enact the events that Big Brother will give to them for the other group (Tour Group) to see. While doing the task, a voiceover by Robi about the details regarding the diorama portrayed by the Museum Group will be heard around the house for the groups to learn. They are not allowed to move or communicate with the other group while doing the task. The result of Live Human Diorama task: Task No. / Date given / Event to imitate / Result; 1 / April 18 (Day 185) / Battle of Mactan / Passed; 2 / April 18 (Day 185) / Bataan Death March / Passed; 3 / April 19 (Day 186) / Family photo of Paolo and JC Alcantara / Passed; 4 / April 22 (Day 189) / Austronesians / Passed; 5 / April 22 (Day 189) / Miss Universe 2015 coronation / Passed / Passed; 2 / April 21 (Day 188) / Surprise Midterm Examination; The Tour Group embarked on an outside world journey to Ayala Museum as a reward for earning the most points during their History Picture Quiz Bee challenge with the help of Mr. Ambeth R. Ocampo, a renowned Filipino public historian. The two teams will work together to fill in the ten blank exhibits displayed in Museo ni Kuya. The Museum Group must read the description of each exhibit and the Tour Group must find the correct artifact that can be found throughout Ayala Museum and must take a picture of it to confirm their answer by sending it through an online messaging application. They only have 20 minutes to complete this task. The points that they will gather at the end of this midterm examination will be added to their final score in their final examination. The result of their surprise midterm exam: No. / Clue (translated from Filipino) / Artifact / Result; 1 / It is a stylized human figure made of wood commonly seen in front of Ifugao houses in the 17th century. / Bulul / Correct; 2 / Jar burials have been one of the burial practices of the past 7,000-2,500 years. These jars like the Manunggul Jar were discovered in this cave. / Not revealed / Wrong; 3 / He was a general who commanded the Armed Forces of the Philippine Revolution. He was strict in training and disciplined so he was known as the best Filipino general of his time. He was killed on June 5, 1899, by the Kawit Battalion. / Assassination of General Antonio Luna / Correct; 4 / It was worn to show the status symbol of men in Bontoc in the 20th century. It is an ornament made of mother-of-pearl shell, string, and metal. / Fikum buckle / Correct; 5 / This national hero was shot on December 30, 1896, in Bagumbayan now better known as Rizal Park. / The execution of Jose Rizal / Correct; 6 / Also called Mickey Mouse Money, these Philippine currencies in 1944 during World War II represented the victory over foreign invasion. / Assorted Japanese invasion money / Correct; 7 / For the first time on March 31, 1521, a celebration took place to spread Roman Catholicism. This celebration was led by Father Pedro de Valderrama. / The First Mass / Correct; 8 / This is a common practice of Southeast Asians to clean the skull of the remains of their loved ones. These bones were then placed in this container. / Secondary burial jar with cover / Correct; 9 / These images of saints were made in the 19th century. Ivory, gold, silver, wood, and other precious stones are their materials. Some of them also used real human hair. / Nuestra Señora del Rosario / Correct; 10 / No clue as their time has run out; Final score / / / 8 / Passed (earned 8 out of 10 correct answers); 3 / April 22 (Day 189) / Final Examination; With the special and only participation of the Museum Group, there are 30 pictures that are hanging in the activity area—they have to identify the right photographs from the distracting ones that are not the same as the original photograph provided to them. They have to select 10 pictures of the events that they have studied all week from Museo ni Kuya, from the Live Human Diorama task, and from the Ayala Museum. The three of them must pull the chariot or kalesa as horses while two of them are on board getting the right pictures. Once complete, they must arrange the 10 photos in chronological order (from the beginning up to the present). They must get 7 or more correct answers to succeed in their weekly task. The result of their final examination: Place No. (in chronological order) / Artifact with date / Housemates' placement / Result; 1 / Austronesian period (5,000-7,000 B.C.) / 1st / Correct; 2 / Magellan's arrival in the Philippines (Mar. 16, 1521) / 2nd / Correct; 3 / First Mass in the Philippines (Mar. 31, 1521) / 3rd / Correct; 4 / Battle of Mactan (Apr. 27, 1521) / 4th / Correct; 5 / Cry of Pugad Lawin (Aug. 23, 1896) / 6th / Wrong; 6 / The execution of Dr. Jose Rizal (Dec. 30, 1896) / 5th / Wrong; 7 / Assassination of General Antonio Luna (June 5, 1899) / 7th / Correct; 8 / Bataan Death March (Apr. 9–17, 1942) / 8th / Correct; 9 / Miss Universe 2015 coronation (Dec. 20, 2015) / 9th / Correct; 10 / Family photo of Paolo and JC Alcantara (circa 2016) / 10th / Correct; Final score / / / 8 / Passed (earned 8 out of 10 correct answers); Grand total / / / 16	Passed
7	April 24 (Day 191)	The Big KumuniTEEN Summer Concert; All of the housemates must create a summer-themed concert throughout the week. They must create five performances on the said concert and must use the musical instruments provided by Big Brother. They must include one musical instrument on each of their performances. P-pop groups SB19 and MNL48 will serve as their mentors in singing and dancing respectively for this weekly task. The concert will be judged alone by the Kumunity; this consists of a panel of 50 people selected by the management between April 25 to 27. At the end of each performance, the Kumunity judging panel will judge their performances and will give a maximum of 50 diamonds to the housemates; each of them can give a diamond to a performance that they like. This will go on for all 6 of their performances; a total of 300 diamonds can be possibly given to the housemates. The housemates must reach at least 250 diamonds or more at the end of all 6 performances in order to succeed in this weekly task and to give ₱100,000 to Bantay Bata: Children's Village, the seventh Kumunity beneficiary for this season. Concert score tally Performance No.: 1 / 2 / 3 / 4 / 5 / 6; 50 / 39 / 31 / 45 / 49 / 50; Final total number of diamonds / / / 264; Performance list: Performance No. / Song / Original artist/s / To be performed by; 1 / Kabataang Pinoy (remix version) / SB19 and BINI / All housemates; 2 / Dahil Sa'yo / Iñigo Pascual / Dustine, Eslam, Luke, Paolo, and Rob; 3 / Mabagal / Daniel Padilla and Moira Dela Torre / Luke and Gabb; 4 / No Way Man / MNL48 (original ver. by AKB48) / Gabb, Maxine, Stephanie, and Tiff (with MNL48); 5 / Bahaghari / Dustine, Eslam, Rob, Stephanie, and Tiff (original composition); 6 / Mapa / SB19 / Dustine, Eslam, Rob, Stephanie, and Tiff (with SB19); — / Bazinga / Guest performance by SB19; Tasks given on the Big KumuniTEEN Summer Concert: No. / Date given / Challenge title and description / Result; 1 / April 25 (Day 192) / The Big KumuniTEEN Concert Auditions; The auditions for the concert was held live on Kumu to determine the leader for this weekly task. All housemates will audition on the Kumu Room and the Kumunity can drop virtual gifts to a housemate of their choice during 10-minute audition windows of every housemate. Virtual gifts sent after each 10-minute window will not be counted. As an added twist, they were distracted by a furry mascot in unexpected times during the duration of their respective auditions. The housemate with the most number of virtual gifts sent by the Kumunity at the end of the auditions will become the leader for the weekly task. NOTE: The listing is based on the chronological order of their respective auditions during the Kumu live stream. The result of the auditions: No. / Housemate / Talent / Diamonds received / Result; 1 / Maxine / Freestyle dancing / 62,600 / Not selected; 2 / Dustine / Poetry and a cappella singing / 12,700 / Not selected; 3 / Tiff / Singing and guitar playing / 45,300 / Not selected; 4 / Eslam / Singing and piano playing / 16,700 / Not selected; 5 / Stephanie / Singing and guitar playing / 386,900 / Not selected; 6 / Paolo / Singing and dancing / 417,600 / Selected (Weekly Task Leader); 7 / Rob / Singing / 74,400 / Not selected; 8 / Gabb / Singing and dancing / 31,700 / ~~Not selected~~ (Co-Task Leader); 9 / Luke / Singing / 72,200 / Not selected; In addition, Paolo was tasked by Big Brother to select a co-task leader for the weekly task; he chose Gabb. / N/A; 2 / April 25 (Day 192) / Selected housemates must try to lift a specified number of musical notes on a wide rectangular-shaped piano platform into a specified height set by Big Brother in order to get musical instruments for their concert. There are four rounds for this task: in each succeeding round, the number of musical notes that they need to lift will be added by 5; a maximum of 20 musical notes for four musical instruments. Four housemates will be assigned as lifters, while the remaining will become the lookout. As an added twist on the third and fourth rounds, the lifters were required to wear blindfolds and were distracted by different sounds while lifting the platform. The housemates must not make the musical notes fall down while lifting—otherwise, they must start from the beginning. They only have 30 minutes to complete this challenge. Selected housemates: Dustine, Luke, Maxine, Stephanie, and Tiff The result of their challenge: Round No. / No. of musical notes needed to lift / No. of musical instruments to be awarded / Result; 1 / 5 / 1 / Correct; 2 / 10 / 2 / Correct; 3 / 15 / 3 / Correct; 4 / 20 / 4 / Time ran out / Passed^{6} (gained three musical instruments); 3 / April 26 (Day 193) / Target Shooting Task; Selected housemates must shoot the 10 targets away from a distance using a toy gun to form a puzzle that displays the reward that they will get after the challenge: the stage needed for their concert. Once a specific target is shot, the accompanied puzzle piece will slide down, revealing the puzzle. They only have 10 rounds to complete this task. When completed, not only will the housemates receive the stage needed for their concert, Maxine, who is celebrating her birthday at that time, will also receive a cake and a video call from her parents. Selected housemates: Eslam, Gabb, Maxine, Paolo, and Rob / Failed^{7} (shot 3 out of 10 targets); 4 / April 28 (Day 195) / Human Sinulid (English: Human Thread); The housemates, including a member of SB19 (Ken) must need to get through the "needle holes" that they must pass through from the living area to the activity area. They can do this as they move their bodies and lying on the floor while being connected at each other. They must pass through all 9 "holes" to get 9 costumes for the said concert. They must start from the beginning if the human thread is cut. The task will begin with two people and one person will be added to the human thread for each hole passed. They only have an hour to complete this task. / Passed^{8} (got all 9 costumes)	Passed
8	May 5 (Day 202)^{9}	Plate Balancing Task; The housemates must balance 200 plates that must be individually placed in 5 tables consisting of 40 thin poles each. All of the plates must not fall throughout the duration of the task and must stay put until the time runs out. They only have 100 minutes to complete this task.	Failed
9	May 13 (Day 210)	Paper Tower of Tibay (English: Paper Tower of Strength); The housemates must build a tower made out of paper in the activity area. They must walk around the pool area for 10 times to get the supplies needed for the weekly task. The housemates must make sure that the paper tower that they built must be at least 7-feet tall and must be sturdy while three diamonds are placed on top of their tower within 100 seconds. The outcome of this weekly task will be the basis of the donation Big Brother will give to Sinag Kalinga Foundation, Inc., the eighth Kumunity beneficiary for this season.	Passed

Notes

1. The teen housemates have only collected nine stars at the end of the weekly task. Therefore, they have failed and were not given their weekly budget.
2. As suggested by Big Brother himself, Don was exempt from performing due to his health condition.
3. The housemates made four mistakes while performing the weekly task. They were made by Rob and Tiff with one mistake each, and Maxine with two mistakes; therefore, they were not given their weekly budget again.
4. The housemates only received 50% of their weekly budget for the week as the task leaders, Dustine and Maxine, traded the other 50% for an extra advantage on the last 15 minutes of their weekly task as said by Big Brother.
5. Kai was in the house when the task was performed. The episode for this task was aired on April 11, 2022, one day after the second eviction night.
6. As punishment, the housemates must construct the remaining unclaimed musical instrument by themselves.
7. Maxine still received her reward even though the housemates failed to shoot the 7 remaining targets required to complete the task. The housemates would have to construct and paint the stage by themselves as another punishment for failing the challenge.
8. As task leader, Paolo was excluded for this challenge to act as their lookout for the challenge along with the other members of SB19.
9. This weekly task must be completed by the housemates in 24 hours after the housemates voted for "a weekly task valid for a day" in the voting asked by Big Brother.

=== Other tasks ===
Task No.	Date given	Type	Task title and description	Participants	Result
Camp Tasks
1	March 13 (Day 149)	Special task	Big Summer Adventure; All of the Teen housemates were sent to a secluded forest that is located far away from the Big Brother House instead of entering immediately. To test their camaraderie, teamwork, and creativity, both of the groups must accomplish a series of tasks given by Big Brother in order for them to finally enter the House. The Teen housemates were divided into two camps: Camp Masagana (Abundant), where all of their materials and camping gears needed were already provided, and Camp Matyaga (Persevering), where they must find their materials and camping gears through tasks. Teams: Camp Masagana: Dustine, Eslam, Gabb, Maxine, and Rob; Camp Matiyaga: Ashton, Don, Kai, Luke, Stef, and Tiff	All housemates	Passed
2	March 17 (Day 153)	Special task	In order to get to know each other, the members of Camp Masagana were tasked to list their memories through two badges: the Badge of Honor (colored white) signifying good memories, and the Badge of Horror (colored black) signifying bad memories. Then, they must explain why and paste both of the badges on their respective sashes.	Dustine, Eslam, Gabb, Maxine, and Rob	Passed
3	March 17 (Day 153)	Special task	The members of Camp Matyaga were tasked to send a member that will go to the other group, Camp Masagana, for that housemate to get to know the other group. The group played a fair game wherein the last man standing will be their representative and will go to the other camp. At the end of the game, Ashton won against Don and was the sole representative that will go to Camp Masagana. Ashton told the members of Camp Masagana about the other housemates, their lifestyles, on how they live there, their friendships, and their surroundings.	Ashton	Passed
House Tasks
4	March 20 (Day 156)	Reward task	Back to the '90s The two new teen housemates, Paolo and Stephanie, were "trapped" in the 90s as they entered a '90s themed room. The housemates must help to "retrieve" them through a task—they must identify five things that were built in the '90s that is displayed in the plasma TV. The items are placed in the garden area and must present it to Big Brother for verification. Only two of them can present at the same time. A bell sound will play once they are correct. Items found on Back to the '90s task: No. / Item / Found by; 1 / 10 Teks (texted game cards) / Kai, Maxine; 2 / Pager / Ashton, Dustine; 3 / Diskette / Eslam, Luke; 4 / 5 inflatable plastic balloons / Don, Rob; 5 / VHS tape / Gabb, Tiff	All housemates	Passed
5	March 21 (Day 157)	Special task	While wearing their school uniforms and inside a '90s themed classroom, the housemates have to go back to the youth stories of the photographs that they see and attached in the notebooks inside of their respective bags that are named after them. They must share their experiences and stories of their parents while they were on their youth days.	All housemates	Passed
6	March 23 (Day 159)	Reward task	Tatsing (English: Touching); In order to receive an additional attempt for their weekly task, the housemates must play a popular '90s game in the Philippines—tatsing. The housemates must defeat the ninjas (dubbed by Big Brother as Batang '90s ['90s Kids]) that will serve as their opponents in the game. In the play area, there are thirty slippers that they can hit using a pamato (shooter) away from the area; twenty of those are colored white, while the remaining ten are black. One point is added to a groups' score if a white slipper is hit and has been removed from the area; otherwise, if they remove a black slipper, one point will be deducted from their score. No score will be added if the slipper moves and does not move away from the area. Only six housemates at a time can participate. As task leaders, Ashton and Gabb were asked if they can switch the members of their groups. The team with the highest points after the round wins the game. Final score: Batang '90s / Teen Housemates; 10 / 0^{1}	Ashton, Dustine, Eslam, Gabb, Luke, Maxine, Stef, and Tiff	Failed
7	March 24 (Day 160)	Secret reward task	Dustine, Gabb, Luke, and Paolo must perform four scoring methods used in basketball: lay-up, free throw, three-points, and half-court. They must perform all of those methods without failing to shoot the ball to earn one point. Only one of them must perform one method at a time. They must gain five points in order for Gabb to successfully receive a special reward for her parents. In addition, Gabb and the other housemates must not know that the task is for Gabb's parents. This secret task was only told to Dustine, Luke, and Paolo.	Dustine, Gabb, Luke, and Paolo	Passed
8	March 25 (Day 161)	Reward task	Kumu Room Presents: Rewind; Chosen by users through Kumunity Decides, Stephanie was asked to do and host a live stream along with the rest of the housemates. They must gather at least 2,000 concurrent views of their livestream on Kumu after two hours in order for them to get an additional attempt for their weekly task.	Stephanie	Failed
9	March 26 (Day 162)	Special task	As leaders of the second weekly task, Ashton and Gabb were summoned by Big Brother to the confession room to have a fun activity: to play jackstone and inflatable plastic balloons, which were popular during the '90s. They were divided into two groups with Ashton and Gabb assigned as their respective leaders and selected their group members.	Ashton and Gabb	Passed
10	March 27 (Day 163)	Special task	Like and Dislike; Similar to liking a post on Instagram, all of the housemates were tasked by Big Brother to put a heart on the housemate (except for the five nominees) that they think that they were connected and close by placing a heart below on that housemates' picture of and must explain their reasons why. The most-liked housemate will wear the Most Liked Pin; as the most-liked housemate, Maxine was given a privilege: the five nominated housemates (Don, Kai, Rob, Stef, and Stephanie) must "serve" her by acting like maids for the rest of the day. This task was also set for the remaining unnominated housemates while wearing the Most Disliked Pin. The result of Like and Dislike task: Housemate / Gave heart to / No. of hearts received; Ashton / Luke / 3; Don / Paolo / 0; Dustine / Luke / 1; Eslam / Gabb / 0; Gabb / Ashton / 2; Kai / Dustine / 0; Luke / Ashton / 2; Maxine / Gabb / 4; Paolo / Maxine / 1; Rob / Maxine / 0; Stef / Ashton / 0; Stephanie / Maxine / 0; Tiff / Maxine / 0	All housemates	Passed
11	March 27 (Day 163)	Special task	As task leaders, Dustine and Maxine were tasked by Big Brother to remove one of a nominated housemates' Most Disliked Pin at a time that the nominees wore earlier. Both of them sought the help of the unnominated housemates for further interrogation. Once removed, the nominated housemate can then stop serving the other unnominated housemates and will be served by the remaining housemate/s.	Dustine and Maxine	Passed
12	March 28 (Day 164)	Special task	The housemates were tasked to share their experiences and memories about their lives on the outside world that they have shared on their respective social media accounts while standing on a heart emoji; but if they see something that has greatly affected them, they will also tell it while standing on an angry emoji.	All housemates	Passed
13	April 2 (Day 169)	Special reward task	The housemates were tasked to clean and sanitize the whole house in pairs while being tied in each other's arms by selecting the part of the house that they will be assigned to clean in a row of tissue papers that has the word CHEERS hidden inside them along with a smiley emoji that signifies as the supervisor of the task. The pair chosen by the supervisor will receive a special reward provided by Big Brother. The housemates' assignments: Letter / Housemates assigned / Area; C / Eslam and Stephanie / Kitchen Area; H / Dustine and Paolo / CR & Gym Area; E (1st and 2nd E) / Maxine and Tiff / Boys' Bedroom; E (3rd and 4th E) / Gabb and Stef / Girls' Bedroom; R / Luke and Rob / Living Room; S / Don and Kai / Garden Area; / Ashton / None (Supervisor)	All housemates	Passed
14	April 4 (Day 171)	Reward task	After explaining to the housemates and Big Brother about missing her father, Stephanie was tasked by Big Brother to do the following tasks in order to see her father that is diagnosed with throat cancer that she hadn't bond with for a long time. Once Stephanie successfully completes all of her tasks, she can have a one-on-one video chat with her father in a special room. The result of Stephanie's task: Task No. / Task description / Result; 1 / Stephanie was tasked to compose a song for her father. / Passed; 2 / Stephanie must teach five of her fellow housemates of her choice on how to properly play the guitar by using an acoustic guitar. / Passed; 3 / Stephanie was also tasked to teach a "foreign exchange student" on how to play the guitar and must do a performance by performing her now newly composed song for her father. Unbeknownst to Stephanie, the "foreign exchange student" was actually her father, who has been observing her while she was doing the second task, which made her emotional. / Passed	Stephanie	Passed
15	April 6 (Day 173)	Secret reward task	Inspiration to Lead; The weekly task leaders, Dustine and Luke, were informed separately that they must complete the weekly task to them in exchange for a reward to their loved ones in the outside world. For Dustine, this will give his brother Austin some school supplies for his education, while for Luke, this will give her mother a small capital (₱10,000) for their sari-sari store.	Dustine and Luke	Passed
16	April 10 (Day 177)	Special task	The housemates were tasked to write the things that their loved ones have did to them by writing it on each of their respective big rocks represented by their hometowns that are placed on different parts of the house and must share it to their fellow housemates in the living area.	All housemates	Passed
17	April 11 (Day 178)	Special task	My Sacrifice; Tiff was tasked by Big Brother to do the following tasks for his younger brother, Jan-jan that is diagnosed with autism. She must grant the three wishes of her younger brother. The result of Tiff's My Sacrifice task: Task No. / Task description / Result; 1 / Tiff was tasked to make lunch for the housemates and for his younger brother that will be delivered to their house that same day. / Passed; 2 / As one of her brother's wishes, Tiff was tasked to cook adobo. She can seek the help of two housemates of her choice. Selected housemates: Paolo and Rob / Passed; 3 / Tiff must do sessions with his younger brother with the housemates—to do therapy and teaching. She can seek the help of two housemates for each of the lessons for this task. Selected housemates: Ashton and Maxine (teaching), Dustine and Stephanie (therapy) / Passed; 4 / As one of her brother's wishes, Tiff was tasked to cook cookies. She can seek the help of Eslam and Stef for this task. / Passed; 5 / As one of her brother's wishes, Tiff was tasked to wrap the gifts Big Brother provided for his younger brother. She can seek the housemates' help for this task. / Passed	Tiff	Passed
18	April 11 (Day 178)	Secret reward task	Thank You Mate; Part 1: Chosen by users through Kumunity Decides, Eslam and Stef must help the mothers of Ashton and Rob in creating a pathway that can be found scattered in the activity area. The other housemates, including Ashton and Rob, must not know this task.	Eslam and Stef	Passed
18	April 11 (Day 178)	Secret reward task	Part 2: Using the pathway that Eslam and Stef along with their mothers have made earlier, Ashton and Rob must carry a 145-kilogram tire from the maze starting from the starting point up to the finish line and again to the starting point and vice versa. They must do this 37 times (which is the sum of both of their ages) in order for them to have a special date with their mothers. Unbeknownst to Ashton and Rob, this was a secret sacrifice for each other.	Ashton and Rob	Passed
18	April 11 (Day 178)	Secret reward task	Part 3: Hours after the main task was finished, Eslam and Stef were tasked by Big Brother to become waiters for the special dates with their mothers. They can seek the two housemates of their choice.	Eslam, Gabb, Luke, and Stef	Passed
19	April 17 (Day 184)	Secret task	As the new batch of nominees, Ashton, Paolo, Rob, and Stephanie must make sure that for the entire week, the other housemates, including the other nominees except for themselves—must not know that they are nominated for eviction.	Ashton, Paolo, Rob, and Stephanie	Passed
20	April 19 (Day 186)	Reward task	What Would Kim Do? In celebration of Teen Edition 1 Big Winner Kim Chiu's birthday inside the house, the female members of Tour Group (Gabb, Maxine, and Tiff) were tasked by Big Brother to act like her. Successfully completing this task will reward them the cake Big Brother provided for Chiu.	Gabb, Maxine, and Tiff	Passed
21	April 19 (Day 186)	Reward task	JC must braid and attach altogether the hairs of Gabb, Maxine, and Tiff along with the wigs of Dustine and Luke just like what Chiu did when she was still a teen housemate. The five of them must sit first while JC braids the wigs and must stand altogether once finished and must go round in circles until Big Brother gives his signal.	Dustine, Gabb, JC, Luke, Maxine, and Tiff	Passed
22	April 20 (Day 187)	Reward task	The Tour Group must find the 15 items that are included on JC and Paolo's family photo that can be found scattered on the activity area. They can only find five items at a time and must place it in a container for Paolo to get the items after they have found the items that they need. They must find all 15 items in order for Paolo to see JC and his father while doing their last human diorama task (which is to re-enact their family photo). The items they need to find in this task: No. / Item / Result; 1 / Spread/mayonnaise / Correct; 2 / Ketchup / Correct; 3 / Flowers / Correct; 4 / Watermelon / Correct; 5 / Blue shirt / Correct; 6 / Red-striped sando / Correct; 7 / Checkered polo and brown top / Correct; 8 / Yellow shirt / Correct; 9 / Grapes in a bowl / Correct; 10 / Banana leaves / Correct; 11 / Bread with container / (found on 2nd try); 12 / Broom with dustpan / Correct; 13 / Sling bag / Correct; 14 / Kettle / Correct; 15 / Rice cooker / (found on 2nd try)	Dustine, Gabb, Luke, Maxine, and Tiff	Passed
23	April 21 (Day 188)	Special task	After rushing to the Confession Room thinking that the other group (Tour Group) was there, the Museum Group were tasked by Big Brother to write their message on a big piece of paper to a selected Tour Group member of their choice. The same task was given to the opposite group a day later.	All housemates	Passed
23	April 23 (Day 190)	Special task	The housemates were finally reunited moments after the result of their Past is Past weekly task. In line with this and with the housemates' missing each other after days of separation, Stephanie was first tasked to compose a message for all of the housemates or to a housemate of their choice. The same task was then given to the other housemates. Unbeknownst to Stephanie, she was chosen by users through Kumunity Decides.	All housemates	Passed
24	April 23 (Day 190)	Special task	Six days after the nominees were determined and keeping it a secret, as the current Head of Household, Tiff was tasked to reveal the current nominees to the housemates by scratching the picture that is covered in scratchable ink by using a big coin that will then reveal the picture of a nominated housemate.	Tiff	Passed
25	May 1 (Day 198)^{2}	Special reward task	Divided into three groups, the housemates must race to move the 3 paper cups that are filled with flour and is inserted on a string on each of the three stations and must get it to the end of a string until another housemate will blow their assigned paper cup. They must only use their mouths to blow their respective paper cups. The team that reaches first to the end of their station and turns on the air conditioner's switch will get a reward that will surely beat the heat this summer: a halo-halo provided by Big Brother. Teams: Team 1 (Red Team): Dustine, Eslam, and Tiff; Team 2 (White Team): Gabb, Paolo, and Rob; Team 3 (Black Team): Luke, Maxine, and Stephanie	All housemates	Passed
26	May 7 (Day 204)	Reward task	How Well Do You Know Each Other? Rob and Stephanie were tasked to host a game show that tests how well the five housemates know their respective mothers. To score a point, the housemates must match the answers of their respective mothers. The pair that gets 3 points wins while the pair that scores less than 3 will receive a fun punishment; they must dance in front with their respective mothers in the living area. Once completed, Rob and Stephanie will get a chance to see their respective mothers virtually.	Rob and Stephanie	Passed
27	May 7 (Day 204)	Punishment task	As a consequence of the numerous violations the teen housemates have committed during their stay, they were asked to choose between one of the two punishments: either they would (a), kneel while doing their task; or (b), stand while doing their task. The majority of the housemates chose A; therefore, the housemates must kneel for 100 minutes and do their tasks at the same time.	All housemates	Passed

Notes

Teens

1. The teen housemates scored 0 points as they removed 4 white and black slippers during the game.
2. Eslam and Luke were in the house before they were both evicted that same night. Team 2 won this game and was rewarded a halo-halo by Big Brother.

=== K.E.A's tasks ===
K.E.A (short for Kuya's Executive Assistant) was introduced to the Teen housemates before Big Brother temporarily left the House shortly on Week 24. Unbeknownst to the Teen housemates, K.E.A was "hacked" by a "scammer" days later when a power outage occurred in the house. The "scammer" K.E.A then lured the housemates into giving them a reward for every secret reward task they complete. This gave the Teen housemates and the viewers a valuable lesson regarding on rising cases of social media fraud in the Philippines.

Task No.	Date given	Type	Task title and description	Participants	Result
1	March 29 (Day 165)	Reward task	With the real K.E.A's help, seven selected housemates must knock down four water bottles while wearing a stocking with a ball attached in order for the bottle to be taken down. They must not step into the white line in order for them to not get buzzed. Each housemate were given three minutes to complete this task. This was in connection to their third weekly task; ten photos will be deducted in their required number of pictures for every housemate that successfully knocks down all four water bottles in the time set. Selected housemates: Don, Eslam, Kai, Luke, Rob, Stephanie, and Tiff	Eslam, Kai, Luke, Rob, Stephanie, Tiff	Passed
1	March 29 (Day 165)	Reward task		Don	Failed
2	March 30 (Day 166)	Secret reward task	Kai was tasked by "scammer" K.E.A to give a foot and body massage to one male and female housemate of her choice for each type of massage. Kai will be given a hamburger by "scammer" K.E.A herself if she successfully completes this task. The other housemates must not know that she is doing this task.	Kai	Passed
3	March 30 (Day 166)	Secret reward task	Eslam was tasked by "scammer" K.E.A to secretly steal some things in the House that are needed by the virtual assistant herself in exchange for an extra cellphone for their third weekly task. The result of Eslam's secret reward task: Name / Result; Boys’ name plates / Correct; Curling iron / Correct; Don's make-up kit / Correct; Dustine's skin care / Correct; Plates / Correct	Eslam	Passed
4	April 1 (Day 168)	Punishment task	In order to retrieve their nameplates, all of the male housemates, except Eslam, must lift their respective large nameplates in the activity area until "scammer" K.E.A's signal. As a twist, fifteen minutes will be deducted for their weekly task if any of the male housemates try to put down their hands while lifting their respective nameplates. Another twist was later added by the "hacked" virtual assistant: the housemates must walk in the pool three times while squatting and holding their nameplates at the same time. Eslam did not participate on this punishment as he was busy for their weekly task.	All boys except Eslam	Passed

== Challenges ==
=== Head of Household ===
Challenge No.	Date given	Challenge title and description	Head of Household
1	March 26 (Day 162)	Each housemate must transfer 2 CDs that is inserted on a slinky and must move it to the end of the slinky by only using their body. The housemate that transfers both of the CDs at the fastest time wins the challenge. Padaluck recipient: Stef (first to create time to beat)	Maxine
2	April 4 (Day 171)	The housemates must imitate the three positions displayed on a blackboard while laying flat on the floor and holding a book on their foot. They must start again from the beginning if ever the book falls. When finished, they must stand on a stair and make a bow to stop their time. The housemate that does this in the fastest time wins the challenge. Padaluck recipient: Paolo (one minute was added to his time to beat)	Stef
3	April 17 (Day 184)^{1,} ^{2}	History Picture Quiz Bee; A deviation of the widely criticized History Quiz Bee, the housemates must guess the pictures displayed by Big Brother on the plasma TV. The first housemate to answer five questions correctly wins the challenge.	Tiff

Notes

Teens

1. Stef participated in this challenge before being evicted on the same night. Should Stef be saved from eviction, then she would be automatically assigned to the Museum Group for the then-upcoming Past is Past weekly task.
2. No Padaluck recipient and campaign was held on Kumu for this challenge to ensure fairness for all the housemates.

=== Group challenges ===
Challenge No.
1
Date given
April 4
(Day 171)
Challenge title and description
PBB University
Served as both a weekly task and a group challenge, the housemates were divided into two groups. They must compete with each other through a series of tasks or "examinations" through different subjects that are taught at schools such as Language and Science.

Teams:

- Team Dustine: Dustine (leader), Kai, Paolo, Rob, Stef, and Stephanie
- Team Luke: Luke (leader), Ashton, Eslam, Gabb, Maxine, and Tiff

The challenges and tasks given on PBB University
Challenge No.	Date given	Challenge title and description	Team Dustine	Team Luke
1	April 4 (Day 171)	To determine the members of each group, the task leaders, or "student leaders", Dustine and Luke, must try to swing a ring to apply it to a hook. Once completed, they should bring the PBB University logo close to their side until a leader successfully reaches the logo to the end of their side. Then, they must choose which housemate they think that should belong to their group. This must be completed in five rounds.	N/A	
2	April 6 (Day 173)	Plastic Bottle Boat Task; The housemates in both groups must successfully create a boat made from different sizes of water bottles. Their boats must not sink and must hold multiple people when tested. The housemates must ride their respective boats in two at a time while wearing their toga hats. They must reach the other end of the pool three times in opposite directions to reach the other pairs until all six of them ride the boat for the last time to reach the finish line and must bow altogether to stop their time. The group that reaches the finish line in the fastest time wins and is safe from the next round of nominations. If both groups are successful, they will be given their weekly budget, otherwise, if only one of the groups succeed, they will be given half of the budget, or none if both of the groups failed to successfully create a boat. They were given one week to complete this task.	Lost (5 minutes and 35 seconds)	Won (2 minutes and 36 seconds)
3	April 6 (Day 173)	Math Quiz Bee; To get an advantage in creating their boats, the first five housemates of a group must successfully answer a math equation by undergoing first through five stations with different mechanics. Then, they can then reveal the number hidden inside the plate once completed (except for Stations 2, 4, and 5 which they must count the numbers by their hands). They must do this one-by-one in the activity area. The sixth housemate must then identify the correct equation. The groups must successfully guess the numbers that when solved, must answer the number 10. The group that does this in the fastest time wins and gets additional materials for their weekly task. The Math Quiz Bee stations: Station No. / Station title and description / Number; 1 / Ampalaya Smoothie (English: Bittergourd Smoothie); The housemate must remove the lid and drink the bittergourd shake. Once empty, the housemate can then look at the number at the bottom of the plate. / 888; 2 / Puso ng Manok (English: Chicken Heart); The housemate must insert their hands into the box that contains chicken hearts and count how many are inside it while cannot be seen or looked at. / 95; 3 / Mata ng Baka (English: Cow's Eye); The housemate must remove the lid to eat and consume the cow's eye. They must fully consume the said exotic food to reveal the hidden number at the bottom of the plate. / 37; 4 / Jolens (English: Marbles); The housemate must stand in the designated area on the floor and from there count the marbles without touching or being near in the marbles. / 102; 5 / Fake Ipis (English: Fake Cockroaches); The housemate must insert two hands inside the box and count how many fake cockroaches are inside of the box. / 8; The result of Math Quiz Bee task: Station No. / Assigned housemate / Final time; Team Dustine: 1 / Stephanie / Time undisclosed; 2 / Paolo / Time undisclosed; 3 / Kai / Time undisclosed; 4 / Dustine / Time undisclosed; 5 / Stef / Time undisclosed; 6 / Rob / Time undisclosed; Team Luke: 1 / Luke / 1 hour and 24 minutes; 2 / Gabb / 1 hour and 24 minutes; 3 / Maxine / 1 hour and 24 minutes; 4 / Ashton / 1 hour and 24 minutes; 5 / Tiff / 1 hour and 24 minutes; 6 / Eslam / 1 hour and 24 minutes	Lost	Won
4	April 7 (Day 174)	History Quiz Bee; One student from each team will go to a podium and must answer history-related questions which will be asked by Professor Robi by pressing their respective buzzers to answer. There are balloons placed above each player—each correct answer of a team will inflate the balloon of the opponent. The opponent's balloon will explode once a team gets two correct answers. The first student to get two correct answers is equivalent to one point for their team and the team that gathers three points first at the end of the game wins and gets additional materials for their weekly task. The result of History Quiz Bee task: Round No. / Question (translated from Filipino) / Answer / Result; Round No. / Question (translated from Filipino) / Answer / Team Dustine / Team Luke; Dustine vs. Luke: 1 / Where is the "Summer Capital of the Philippines"? / Baguio / Wrong / Correct; 1 / Complete the full name of national hero Jose Rizal: José Protacio Rizal _____ y Alonso Realonda. / Mercado / Correct / Wrong; 1 / In which war was the First Republic of the Philippines first established? / Philippine-American War / Wrong / Correct; Paolo vs. Maxine: 2 / How many and what are the colors found in the Philippine flag? / 4 (Blue, Red, Yellow and White) / Correct / Wrong; 2 / By what name is the Filipino General Gregorio del Pilar better known? / Goyo / Correct / Wrong; Rob vs. Eslam: 3 / The "Mother of the Association" Melchora Aquino is also known by what nickname? / Tandang Sora (Elder Sora) / did not answer; 3 / How many people are in front of the one-thousand peso bill? / 3 (José Abad Santos, Vicente Lim, and Josefa Llanes Escoda) / Wrong / Correct; 3 / Who is the Philippine president featured on both the 20 peso bill and coin? / Manuel Quezon / Wrong / Correct; Kai vs. Gabb: 4 / What is Jose Rizal's famous nickname? / Pepe / Wrong / Correct; 4 / What is the name of the longest bridge in the Philippines? / San Juanico Bridge / Correct / Wrong; 4 / Who is the hero featured on the 5-peso coin? / Emilio Aguinaldo/Andres Bonifacio / Correct / Wrong; Tiebreaker Round Dustine vs. Ashton: 5 / Who made the famous painting Spolarium? / Juan Luna / Wrong / Correct; 5 / Give the titles of the two famous books written by Jose Rizal. / Noli Me Tángere and El Filibusterismo / Correct / Wrong; 5 / Called Walled City, this place is located in Manila. / Intramuros / Wrong / Correct; 5 / "Jasminum sambac" is better known by what Filipino name? / Sampaguita / Correct / Wrong; 5 / In what town in Laguna was Jose Rizal born? / Calamba, Laguna / Correct / Wrong; Final score / / / 3 / 2	Won	Lost
5	April 8 (Day 175)	Language Class; Taught by English "major" teacher Melai, the housemates must accurately translate the proverbs or salawikain in English from Filipino. To answer, the five housemates must perform first a human table by laying down on each table and must crawl to the other side without falling; they should not cross the line. The first group to do this will get to answer first and once correct, will be given a point for their team. The group that gets two points first gets more additional materials for their weekly task. The result of Language Class task: Round No. / Proverb (in English) / Proverb (in Filipino) / Result; Round No. / Proverb (in English) / Proverb (in Filipino) / Team Dustine / Team Luke; Paolo vs. Ashton: 1 / If there's no patience, there's no beef stew. / Kapag walang tiyaga, walang nilaga. / did not answer; Kai vs. Gabb: 2 / Rock, rock in the sky, take cover, don't get angry. / Bato bato sa langit, ang matamaan, huwag magalit. / Correct / Wrong; Dustine vs. Tiff: 3 / If someone throws stones at you, throw back bread. / Kapag binato ka ng bato, batuhin mo ng tinapay. / Wrong / Correct; Tiebreaker Round Paolo vs. Tiff: 4 / If you plant... versus zombies, you harvest. / Kapag may tinanim, may aanihin. / Wrong / Correct; Final score / / / 1 / 2	Lost	Won

Winner
Team Luke
Loser(s)
Team Dustine

=== The Ten Million Diamonds Challenge ===
Challenge No.
1
Date given
May 12
(Day 209)
Challenge title and description
Pole Throw Battle
The housemates must try to place their assigned colored pole on a board that has five pegs with each peg level having an assigned point value; one point from the bottom until to the top that has five points. The pole must be straight to the placed position in the board in order for the assigned pegs' score to be valid. The housemates' score will be removed if it has been removed by another housemates' pole during the duration of the challenge or will be considered invalid if the pole placed is slant on the board.

They only have five hours to complete this; whoever has the most points after the duration of the task will own the three million diamonds gathered by themselves on the group challenge.

Two tiebreaker rounds have occurred for this challenge due to a tie in the first two rounds. Ten minutes and five minutes were given for the tied housemates in the two rounds of the tiebreaker round to determine the final owner of the diamonds.

Final result of the Pole Throw task
Housemate	Gabb	Maxine	Paolo	Rob	Stephanie
Points garnered					
Points garnered	5	0	1	5	5
Points garnered	3	Ineligible	Ineligible	0	3
Points garnered	8	Ineligible	Ineligible	Ineligible	0
Total	16	0	1	5	8

==== The Ten Million Diamonds Group Challenge ====
A special variation of the challenge was featured during the Teen edition featured the Teen housemates competing against a group of Teen houseplayers to gain a portion of the ten million diamonds given by Big Brother. They must defend their diamonds against the houseplayers to earn a bigger portion of the diamonds.

Challenge No.	Date given	Challenge title and description	Teen Housemates	Houseplayers
1	May 10 (Day 207)	Push of War; The housemates and houseplayers must defend their flags by pulling the cart towards the opponents' side until it reaches their respective colored flag. There will be four match-ups that consists of two rounds each; the first three will be one-on-one, while the last match-up will be three-by-three. One million diamonds are at stake in the first three match-ups, while two million diamonds are at stake at the final match-up. The team that wins on each round will be given the diamonds that are at stake in that round, meaning that if the housemates lose on a round, the diamond value at stake will then belong to the houseplayers, or not if they succeed. The result of Push of War: Match-Up No. / Match-Up Winner / / Overall Result; Match-Up No. / Round 1 / Round 2 / Overall Result; Ika vs. Stephanie: 1 / Houseplayers / Houseplayers / Lost (lost 1,000,000 diamonds); David vs. Rob: 2 / Teen Housemates / Teen Housemates / Won (defended 1,000,000 diamonds); Yanna vs. Gabb: 3 / Houseplayers / Houseplayers / Lost (lost 1,000,000 diamonds); David, Ika, and Yanna vs. Gabb, Rob, and Stephanie: 4 / Teen Housemates / Teen Housemates / Won (defended 2,000,000 diamonds)	Won (gained 3 million diamonds)	Lost (gained 2 million diamonds)
2	May 11 (Day 208)	Tower of Time; The housemates and houseplayers must race to build a tower in an hour. Each team must select three players where the first player will use a pole to land the yellow bricks to their area and must shoot into the basket held by the second player. The first player can defend the hanging yellow bricks above against the other group and may stop the opponent to shoot more yellow bricks in their basket. When all of the 100 yellow bricks above the net have been collected, the second player can then go to a table with a container to pick up the collected yellow bricks to get additional colored bricks that they can add to the bricks that they will stack. 1 yellow brick collected is equivalent to a pouch that contains 10 colored bricks. Once finished, only the second and third players can then build their respective towers. The team that has the tallest tower of bricks after one hour will own the remaining five million diamonds. Tower of Time members: Player No. / Teen Housemates / Houseplayers; 1 / Paolo / David; 2 / Maxine / Erica; 3 / Gabb / Alyanna; Final result of Tower of Time: Teen Housemates / Houseplayers; 62 inches / 80 inches	Lost (lost 5 million diamonds)	Won (gained 5 million diamonds)
Total no. of diamonds earned			3,000,000	7,000,000

=== Final Five spot challenges ===
Challenge No.
Date given
Challenge title and description
Winner/s
Dethroned/Loser(s)
1
May 3
(Day 201)
The housemates must balance a can while holding it on a stick and must walk through a series of obstacle courses at the same time. They must successfully place the can on a platform above without letting it fall throughout the course. They must start from the beginning and must wait for their turn again if ever their respective cans fall down. The first two housemates to place their respective cans will claim the first two spots of their Final Five.

As the housemates that were ranked from first to fifth, Tiff, Gabb, Stephanie, Paolo, and Maxine were only required to place two cans, while Dustine and Rob, who were ranked sixth to seventh respectively, were required to place three cans.

Final results
Housemate	Dustine	Gabb	Maxine	Paolo	Rob	Stephanie	Tiff
Points garnered							
Points garnered	0	2	0	2	0	0	0

Gabb
Paolo
N/A
2
May 4
(Day 202)
Dustine, Gabb, Paolo, and Tiff must place six (five for Gabb and Paolo) their respective beanbags on each of the boxes that spell the words "FINAL 5". They must place it by using a catapult to place their respective beanbags on each letter. They are not allowed to skip each letter and must follow the sequence from left to right. The two housemates that fills the boxes first will become the official members of the Final Five.

As Final Five spot holders, Gabb and Paolo were given an advantage; they can place a beanbag on a selected box of their choice before the game starts, meaning that they have to only place 5 beanbags; while Dustine and Tiff were required to place all 6 beanbags.

Paolo
(defender, first official Final Five member)

Gabb
(defender, second official Final Five member)

Tiff
(challenger, lost)

Dustine
(challenger, lost)

== Nomination history ==
In each standard nomination round, every housemate is called to the confession room to nominate two of their housemates for eviction with the first nominee receiving 2 points and the other receiving 1 point. The housemates with the most nomination points (usually 3) will then face the public vote to determine the evictee for that round. However, Big Brother may automatically nominate a housemate for rule violations or a failure in a task. On the other hand, immunity may be awarded as a reward for accomplishing a task. Big Brother may forcibly evict a housemate for severe violations and a housemate may opt to voluntarily leave the house. In certain circumstances, the nomination process may be delayed as a result of a pending challenge or task.

	#1	#2	#3	#4	#5	#6	#7	Top 2	Nominations Received
Eviction Day and Date	Day 169 Apr. 3	Day 176 Apr. 10	Day 183 Apr. 17	Day 190 Apr. 24	Day 197 May 1	Day 205 May 8	Day 210 May 14		Nominations Received
Nomination Day and Date	Day 163; Mar. 28	Day 170; Apr. 4	Day 177; Apr. 11	Day 184; Apr. 18	Day 191; Apr. 25	Day 202; May 6	Day 206; May 10	—	Nominations Received
Rob	Paolo; Don	Paolo; Luke	No nominations	Paolo; Luke	Luke; Gabb	No nominations	No nominations	Teen Top 2 (Day 210)	30 (+2)
Gabb	Stephanie; Don	Kai; Rob	No nominations	Stephanie; Rob	Stephanie; Dustine	No nominations	No nominations	Teen Top 2 (Day 210)	3
Stephanie	Don; Rob	Rob; Tiff	No nominations	Ashton; Rob	Luke; Gabb	No nominations	No nominations	Evicted (Day 210)	19 (+2)
Maxine	Stef; Kai	Kai; Stephanie	No nominations	Stephanie; Luke	Luke; Stephanie	No nominations	No nominations	Evicted (Day 210)	1 (+1)
Paolo	Rob; Stephanie	Kai; Stephanie	No nominations	Rob; Ashton	Eslam; Luke	No nominations	No nominations	Evicted (Day 210)	15
Tiff	Stef; Paolo	Stephanie; Eslam	No nominations	Luke; Eslam	Eslam; Luke	No nominations	Evicted (Day 204)		5 (+1)
Dustine	Rob; Don	Rob; Ashton	No nominations	Ashton; Stephanie	Tiff; Gabb	No nominations	Evicted (Day 204)		4 (+1)
Eslam	Kai; Stef	Paolo; Kai	No nominations	Paolo; Rob	Luke; Stephanie	Evicted (Day 197)			11
Luke	Kai; Rob	Rob; Stephanie	No nominations	Paolo; Dustine	Dustine; Eslam	Evicted (Day 197)			15
Ashton	Rob; Don	Rob; Kai	No nominations	Paolo; Eslam	Evicted (Day 190)				6
Stef	Eslam; Rob	Rob; Eslam	No nominations	Evicted (Day 183)					5 (+1)
Kai	Tiff; Stephanie	Rob; Maxine	Evicted (Day 176)						13
Don	Rob; Stephanie	Evicted (Day 169)							6
Notes	^{None}		^{1}	^{None}	^{2,} ^{3,} ^{4,} ^{5}	^{5,} ^{6}	^{7,} ^{8}		
Head of Household	Maxine	Stef	None	Tiff	None		Challenge Score + Open Voting		
Up for eviction	Don; Kai; Rob; Stef; Stephanie	Kai; Rob; Stephanie	Rob; Stef; Stephanie	Ashton; Paolo; Rob; Stephanie	Dustine; Eslam; Gabb; Luke; Stephanie	Dustine; Maxine; Rob; Stephanie; Tiff	Challenge Score + Open Voting		
Saved from eviction	Rob; 34.71% Stef; 16.58% Kai; 12.05% Stephanie; 8.09%	Rob; 34.75% Stephanie; 18.91%	Rob; 27.33% Stephanie; 16.54%	Rob; 28.84% Paolo; 17.31% Stephanie; 13.56%	Stephanie; 20.75% Gabb; 16.66% Dustine; 11.08%	Maxine; 25.38% Rob; 24.17% Stephanie; 15.58%	Rob; 27.10% Gabb; 22.34%		
Evicted	Don; 2.09%	Kai; 17.22%	Stef; 14.39%	Ashton; 12.38%	Eslam; 8.22% Luke; 3.31%	Tiff; 12.16% Dustine; 5.14%	Stephanie; 16.71% Maxine; 15.42% Paolo; 11.06%		
References									

Legend
Housemate received immunity after becoming a Head of Household.
Housemate received immunity after winning or finishing a task or challenge
Housemate was automatically nominated as a result of a loss in a challenge.

Notes

1. For winning the PBB University group challenge, Team Luke, consisting of its namesake, Ashton, Eslam, Gabb, Maxine, and Tiff were awarded immunity for the week. On the other hand, Team Dustine, consisting of its namesake, Paolo, Rob, Stef, and Stephanie decided that week's nominees.
2. For this week, the housemates had a face to face nomination unlike the previous nomination rounds.
3. Gabb gave her Nomination Immunity Pass to Paolo, giving him immunity for this week's nomination.
4. Maxine and Rob won immunity after winning the most Vote to Save face-to-face nomination.
5. This eviction is a double eviction wherein two nominees are set to be evicted.
6. Paolo and Gabb secured their first two Final Five slot after defending their spot to Tiff and Dustine, the challengers.
7. Rob and Gabb did not leave the house. They will be joined by the Top 2 of each batch.
8. Stephanie and Maxine did not leave on Day 210. As the next two highest voters, they were the comeback housemates in the teen batch.

=== Powers ===
On Day 162, Gabb was awarded a Nomination Immunity Pass for having the most number of followers among her fellow housemates during their Follower Sprint task that was held from March 22 to 25, 2022. On the fifth round of nominations, Gabb gave her Nomination Immunity Pass to Paolo, guaranteeing him another week in the house by giving himself immunity.

=== Special Nomination Processes ===
Prior to the fifth nominations, the housemates observed two special nomination processes which granted immunity to the winners of each process.

==== Yellow Discs ====
For this process, each housemate is given five yellow discs, each representing a positive nomination point. A housemate may choose to award each disc to a housemate of their choice (including themselves) by shooting each disc into that particular housemate's container. A point will be considered valid should its corresponding disc land on their intended container, otherwise it would be invalidated.

The housemate(s) with the highest number of discs inserted in their respective containers will then be granted immunity from that week's nomination. The remaining housemates will then move to another round of nomination. As Ashton was evicted from the house prior to the nominations, any points he had received were invalidated.

Final score
Ashton	Dustine	Eslam	Gabb	Luke	Maxine	Paolo	Rob	Stephanie	Tiff
~~0~~	0	0	1	0	3	0	3	1	0

The result of their Yellow Disc nomination process
Housemate	Disc 1	Disc 2	Disc 3	Disc 4	Disc 5
Ashton	Stephanie	Maxine	Rob	Gabb	Tiff
Dustine	Luke	Gabb	Maxine	Stephanie	Rob
Eslam	Dustine	Maxine	Rob	Gabb	Stephanie
Gabb	Ashton	Maxine	Tiff	Luke	Luke
Luke	Maxine	Tiff	Stephanie	Gabb	Gabb
Maxine	Tiff	Stephanie	Gabb	Gabb	Maxine
Paolo	Dustine	Maxine	Maxine	Gabb	Gabb
Rob	Stephanie	Ashton	Eslam	Tiff	Maxine
Stephanie	Rob	Maxine	Dustine	Tiff	Ashton
Tiff	Rob	Gabb	Stephanie	Maxine	Ashton

Legend
Housemate successfully shoots the disc in the chosen housemates' container.
Housemate failed to shoot the disc in the chosen housemates' container.
Underlined name denotes a vote intended to be cast for oneself.

==== Red Discs ====
Following Ashton's eviction, the housemates had their fifth nominations, in which each housemate's nominations were cast publicly. In this process, each housemate is given three red discs, each representing a nomination point. Each housemate, including those made immune by the Yellow Disc challenge were obligated to nominate two housemates by placing discs on the housemates they chose to nominate for eviction, with the first nominee receiving two discs and the second receiving one disc. The housemates with the least discs would be saved from nominations, with the rest being nominated for that week.

== Kumunity beneficiaries ==
- Girls Got Game Philippines, Inc. — The teen housemates were informed that they have the chance to help a Kumunity in need, and the Girls Got Game Philippines, Inc. will be the said Kumunity in need of help. The outcome of their Body Photo Mosaic Making weekly task wherein they must successfully mimic a photo mosaic with 324 different pieces of photographs will determine the amount to be given to this Kumunity. As of this date, the amount given by Big Brother and the housemates to this Kumunity was not revealed, nor was posted in each of their social media accounts.
- Bantay Bata: Children's Village — Big Brother revealed on Day 191 that the Bantay Bata: Children's Village will be the next Kumunity in need. To determine the outcome and basis of the donation that Big Brother will donate to this Kumunity, the housemates were given the Big KumuniTEEN Summer Concert weekly task wherein the housemates must create a summer-themed concert throughout the week. The housemates must earn at least 250 diamonds after all of their performances. Big Brother and the housemates donated one hundred thousand pesos (₱100,000) to this Kumunity after the Teen housemates successfully completed the said weekly task.
  - Another charity task for the same beneficiary was given to the Biga-10 housemates. Named the Biga-10 Bayanihan para sa Bantay Bata, the housemates of three Kumunities were tasked to create a 5-minute superhero-themed play. They must assign one housemate as their brand ambassador/ambassadress of the beneficiary. The public will then select a housemate to become the face of the said beneficiary. The hero's assigned Kumunity that has the highest number of virtual gifts at the end of the livestream on Kumu will become the said ambassador.
- Sinag Kalinga Foundation, Inc. — A beneficiary that houses aged people that do not have a permanent home, this Kumunity beneficiary is the last that they will be giving help for this edition. The housemates were given their last weekly task named the Paper Tower of Tibay where they must make a paper tower that is 7-foot tall. They must make sure that the tower they have made will be sturdy when three heavy diamonds are placed for 100 seconds. The Teen housemates successfully completed the said weekly task but Big Brother did not announce on how much did he donated for this beneficiary during the episodes' broadcast.

== S-E voting system result ==
Eviction No.	Nominee	Votes			Result	Refs.
Eviction No.	Nominee	To-Save	To-Evict	Net Total	Result	Refs.
1	Don	9.00%	-6.91%	2.09%	Evicted	
1	Kai	12.61%	-0.56%	12.05%	Saved	
1	Rob	35.23%	-0.52%	34.71%	Saved	
1	Stef	17.75%	-1.17%	16.58%	Saved	
1	Stephanie	12.16%	-4.07%	8.09%	Saved	
2	Kai	23.67%	-6.45%	17.22%	Evicted	
2	Rob	35.92%	-1.17%	34.75%	Saved	
2	Stephanie	25.85%	-6.94%	18.91%	Saved	
3	Rob	27.72%	-0.39%	27.33%	Saved	
3	Stef	24.35%	-9.96%	14.39%	Evicted	
3	Stephanie	27.06%	-10.52%	16.54%	Saved	
4	Ashton	19.71%	-7.33%	12.38%	Evicted	
4	Paolo	18.06%	-0.75%	17.31%	Saved	
4	Rob	29.28%	-0.44%	28.84%	Saved	
4	Stephanie	19.00%	-5.44%	13.56%	Saved	
5	Dustine	12.92%	-1.84%	11.08%	Saved	
5	Eslam	9.13%	-0.91%	8.22%	Evicted	
5	Gabb	28.71%	-12.05%	16.66%	Saved	
5	Luke	5.50%	-2.19%	3.31%	Evicted	
5	Stephanie	23.75%	-3.00%	20.75%	Saved	
6	Dustine	5.77%	-0.63%	5.14%	Evicted	
6	Maxine	26.37%	-0.99%	25.38%	Saved	
6	Rob	25.71%	-1.54%	24.17%	Saved	
6	Stephanie	18.78%	-3.20%	15.58%	Saved	
6	Tiff	14.59%	-2.43%	12.16%	Evicted	
7	Gabb	23.38%	-1.04%	22.34%	Finalist	
7	Maxine	16.60%	-1.18%	15.42%	Evicted	
7	Paolo	11.30%	-0.24%	11.06%	Evicted	
7	Rob	27.44%	-0.34%	27.10%	Finalist	
7	Stephanie	17.59%	-0.88%	16.71%	Evicted	

== Controversies and criticisms ==
=== Inappropriate remarks ===
Stephanie Jordan called out Rob Blackburn for allegedly shouting at fellow housemate Kai Espenido as he was participating in K.E.A.'s punishment task, saying "Rob, next time you don't shout because di niya kasalanan 'to, ang sama ng ugali mo Rob!" ("Rob, next time you don't shout because it's not her fault, your attitude is bad Rob!") after Blackburn said "You should be!" to Espenido in an aggravated tone which caused the latter to cry. Jordan reiterated the events outside to Gabb Skribikin and Stef Draper, who were working on their weekly task inside. Jordan went back outside for a while, but quickly went inside again after Skribikin and Maxine Trinidad calmed her down, and Tiff Ronato restrained her from going outside in order for Blackburn to not feel any more pressure. Espenido was still crying when she came back, and Draper said that "it was the third time he (Blackburn) shouted to girls", in which Jordan responded "Di yan pwede guys, di yan pwede! Kahit anong gagawin mo, hindi ka pwede sumigaw sa tao na walang dahilan! Di tayo pwede maging soft sa lalaki na walang utak na ginagamit!" ("That's not allowed guys, that's not allowed! Whatever you do, you can't shout at someone without a reason! We can't be soft to boys that don't use their brains!"), which earned a mixed reaction from viewers. Some praised her for being frank and unfiltered, while others criticized her for the words she used and for being insensitive towards Blackburn, who had told Draper and Trinidad in an earlier episode about trauma he had from being a victim of bullying by his classmates. Blackburn apologized to Espenido the day after the incident. This was a primary factor that caused Jordan to garner a lot of BBEs in succeeding evictions.

During the fifth round of nominations, Gabb Skribikin gave 2 points to Stephanie Jordan, citing that she hasn't been evicted from the first nomination up to that point, and Skribikin wanted to see "how much can she (Jordan) go". As a result, Skribikin was heavily criticized online for being insensitive towards Jordan, who was nominated for the fifth straight time alongside Skribikin, who herself was nominated for the first time, with many bringing up her widely panned "MaJoHa", "SLEX", and "Sultan Kudarat" blunders during their History Picture Quiz Bee challenge. Both Jordan and Skribikin were saved from eviction by the end of the week, with Jordan topping the polls after 4 consecutive second-to-last finishes.

=== Housemates' performance on quiz bee ===
Gabb Skribikin and Kai Espenido were widely criticized across social media platforms for incorrectly answering a question about the collective nickname of three Filipino priests executed during the Spanish colonial period, namely Mariano Gomez, Jose Burgos, and Jacinto Zamora, known as Gomburza, during their History Quiz Bee. Espenido answered "MarJo", while Skribikin answered "MaJoHa". The latter was also criticized for answering "SLEX" to a question about the San Juanico Bridge. Viewers said that the incorrect answers of both Espenido and Skribikin are a symptom of the Philippines' poor education system, and others called for the Department of Education (DepEd) to "open the schools" online. Because of this, Big Brother decided to refreshen the teen housemates' knowledge in Philippine history by giving them quizzes in the form of a Head of Household challenge along with an examination weekly task that was given to them in the following week, though Espenido was already evicted a week prior, thus she didn't participate in the History Week.

Host Robi Domingo, who asked the history questions to the housemates, expressed his disappointment on Twitter a few days after the history quiz bee trended across social media, saying

“Sa una, nakakatawa pero habang tumatagal, di na nakakatuwa. Sana maging daan ito para makita kung ano ang kakulangan sa sistema ng ating edukasyon. Sa lahat ng content creators, let's battle #MaJoHa.” ("At first, it's funny but as time passes by, it's not amusing anymore. I hope this will be a way to shed light on the gaps in our education system. To all content creators, let's battle #MaJoHa.")

— Robi Domingo, Twitter
