= Emmanuel de Dios =

Emmanuel "Noel" S. de Dios is a Filipino economist, author, academic and former activist best known for the influence his publications have had on the fields of political economy, economic theory, and institutional development as applied to the Philippines context. He has been associated with the University of the Philippines School of Economics since 1980 and continues to play a role in the UPSE as a Professor Emeritus.

De Dios had initially enrolled in the literature-focused Philippine Studies course at the Ateneo de Manila University, but dropped out to pursue full-time student activism with the Samahang Demokratiko ng Kabataan (SDK) after the declaration of Martial law under Ferdinand Marcos in 1972. In the following years, though, de Dios developed an interest in understanding economics, and enrolled in Ateneo's Economics degree after returning to school. He graduated cum laude from the course in 1978, some years after the SDK was dissolved in 1975. He then took his masters in ecnomics at the UP School of Economics and joined the faculty in 1980, also earning his Ph.D. there in 1987.

Because of the long and consequential period in Philippine history that was the two-decades long administration of President Ferdinand Marcos, two of de Dios' early works at different points in his early career came to play significant roles in Philippine history: the anonymously written January 1974 political manifesto titled "Hinggil sa Legal na Pakikibaka" (HLP) which helped shape the engagement approaches of the Samahang Demokratiko ng Kabataan and other aboveground political groups in the resistance against the Marcos dictatorship; and the June 1984 UP School of Economics "White Paper" whose official title was "An Analysis of the Philippine Economic Crisis" for which de Dios served as Editor, documenting a year of workshops in which he and nine prominent UPSE economists asserted that the nosedive which the Philippine economy was taking towards the end of the Marcos regime was driven by crony capitalism and the many monopolies the Marcos administration had allowed over the years, rather than being triggered by external global shocks as asserted by government economists of the time.

== See also ==
- Winnie Monsod
- Cielo Magno
- JC Punongbayan
