= Open Government Partnership =

2011 multilateral initiative

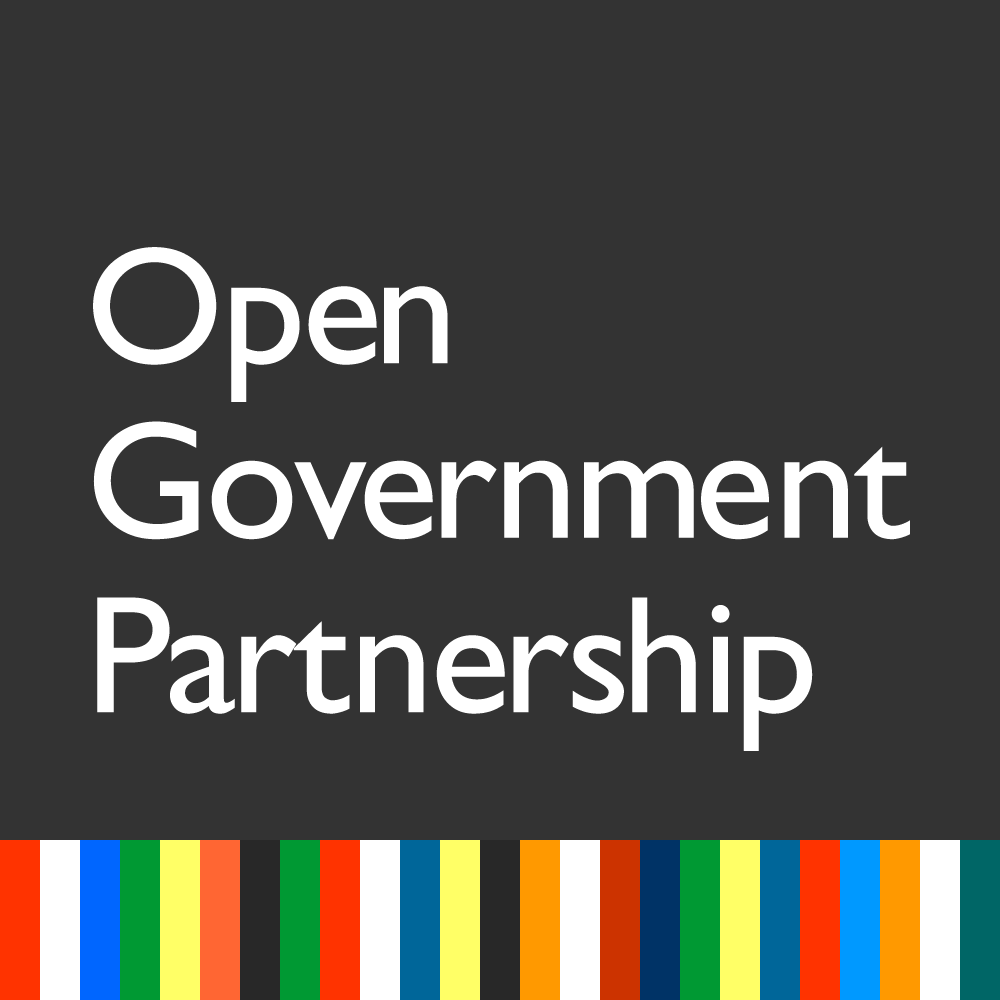
- Abbreviation: OGP
- Formation: September 20, 2011; 15 years ago
- Founder: Brazil Indonesia; Mexico; Norway; Philippines; South Africa; United Kingdom United States
- Founded at: New York, United States
- Headquarters: Washington, D.C., United States
- Location: Worldwide
- Members: 73 (National); 136 (Local)
- CEO: Aidan Eyakuze
- Website: opengovpartnership.org

The Open Government Partnership (OGP) is a multilateral initiative aimed at securing commitments from national and sub-national governments to promote open government, combat corruption, and improve governance. The OGP is managed by a steering committee that includes representatives from governments and from civil society organizations.

== History ==
The Open Government Partnership was formally launched on September 20, 2011, on the sidelines of a UN General Assembly meeting during which heads of state from eight founding governments (Brazil, Indonesia, Mexico, Norway, the Philippines, South Africa, the United Kingdom, and the United States) endorsed the Open Government Declaration and announced their country action plans along with an equal number of civil society leaders. The eight founding members also welcomed the commitment of 38 governments to join the OGP. India and Russia had initially expressed intentions to join the partnership, but neither followed through with the process.

Six months after its start, OGP had grown from eight action plans and 46 participating countries to 50 action plans and 54 participating countries. The meeting in Brasília brought together countries and organizations united in their belief in the power of transparency, with participation from anti-censorship campaigners in Yemen to reformers using data on primary schools to improve education in India.

A total of 46 members had already published action plans containing over 300 open government commitments. According to the then Minister of the United Kingdom's Cabinet Office responsible for public transparency and open data, Francis Maude, Britain sought to "further secure the foundations of OGP as a globally recognized and respected international initiative…. [and to] strengthen the role of civil society organizations, encouraging greater collaboration with governments to forge more innovative and open ways of working."

In 2013, OGP's thematic goals centered around citizen action and responsive government. In an era of hyperconnectivity, openness and transparency, as well as citizen participation and collaboration, are increasingly viewed as essential components of good governance.

With the adoption and implementation of the 2030 Agenda for Sustainable Development by world leaders at a historic United Nations Summit, including Sustainable Development Goals (SDG) 16 for the "promotion of peaceful and inclusive societies," 2015 marked a milestone for the future of development outcomes and open government. In October 2015, the Government of Mexico hosted the third OGP Global Summit in Mexico City, emphasizing the theme "Openness for All: Using the Open Government Principles as Key Mechanisms to Implement the Post-2015 Development Agenda."

In early 2016, OGP launched a new pilot program designed to involve sub-national governments more proactively in the initiative. Later in December 2016, the Government of France, in partnership with the World Resources Institute (WRI), hosted the fourth OGP Global Summit in the nation's capital, Paris, gathering 3000 representatives from 70 countries.

In the first 10 years, OGP members created over 4,500 commitments in more than 300 action plans.

== Objectives ==
OGP serves as a platform for reformers within and outside governments worldwide to develop initiatives that enhance transparency, empower citizens, combat corruption, and utilize new technologies to improve governance. OGP seeks to secure concrete commitments from national and sub-national governments to promote open government reform and innovation, advancing transparency, accountability, and citizen engagement. It is a voluntary partnership that countries choose to join, allowing civil society organizations to collaborate with governments on initiatives aligned with their reform agendas.

=== Open Government Declaration ===
The principles of OGP are best explained by the Open Government Declaration. As outlined in the declaration, participating countries are expected to adhere to the following principles:

- Acknowledge that people all around the world are demanding more openness in government. They are calling for greater civic participation in public affairs and seeking ways to make their governments more transparent, responsive, accountable, and effective.
- Recognize that countries are at different stages in their efforts to promote openness in government and that each of us pursues an approach consistent with our national priorities and circumstances and the aspirations of our citizens.
- Accept responsibility for seizing this moment to strengthen our commitments to promote transparency, fight corruption, empower citizens, and harness the power of new technologies to make government more effective and accountable.
- Uphold the value of openness in our engagement with citizens to improve services, manage public resources, promote innovation, and create safer communities. We embrace principles of transparency and open government with a view toward achieving greater prosperity, well-being, and human dignity in our own countries and in an increasingly interconnected world.

OGP participants declare their commitment to increase the availability of information about governmental activities, support civic participation, implement the highest standards of professional integrity, and increase access to new technologies for openness and accountability.

=== Community of reformers ===
Rather than establish a worldwide transparency ranking of countries, OGP provides support and encouragement to countries around the world as they champion ambitious new reforms and deliver on their promises "under the watchful eyes of citizens." The community of reformers is meant to "offer support to those in government that are willing and to create a hook whereby the conversations among government and civil society can occur." This relationship between government and civil society is the cornerstone of OGP. Governments are expected to actively collaborate with civil society when drafting and implementing country commitments, as well as when reporting on and monitoring efforts. The OGP process requires the government to consult with civil society and citizens, and the Independent Reporting Mechanism (IRM) assesses the quality of this consultation.

== Funding ==
The Open Government Partnership is funded through three primary sources: country contributions, bilateral agencies, and private foundations. Country contributions are core, unrestricted funds that support the OGP Support Unit's services to all members. Funding from bilateral and private donors complements this by supporting specific initiatives and strategic priorities.

=== Country contributions ===
In May 2014, it was agreed that all participating governments were expected to contribute to OGP's budget. Contributions are based on each participating country's income level (according to World Bank data) with additional consideration introduced for GDP size. The OGP Steering Committee sets both minimum and recommended contribution levels.

Income level	Minimum member contribution	Recommended member contribution
Low income	$13,500	$33,750
Lower middle income	$33,750	$67,500
Upper middle income	$67,500	$135,000
High income (<$100bn GDP)	$67,500	$135,000
High income ($100bn to $2500bn GDP)	$135,000	$270,000
High income (>$2500bn GDP)	$200,000	$400,000

== Structure ==
As a multi-stakeholder initiative, civil society participation is enshrined in OGP's foundational principles and management structures. Governments and civil society play an equally important role in managing the OGP through participation in the steering committee, the OGP's executive management body, as well as at the national level.

=== Co-chairs ===
Year	Government Co-chair	Civil Society Co-chair
2012–2013	Government of the United Kingdom	Warren Krafchik, Senior Vice President, International Budget Partnership (IBP)
2013–2014	Government of Indonesia	Rakesh Rajani, Head, Twaweza
2014–2015	Government of Mexico	Alexandro Gonzales, Executive Director, GESOC A.C.
2015–2016	Government of South Africa	Suneeta Kaimal, Chief Operating Officer, Natural Resource Governance Institute (NRGI)
2016–2017	Government of France	Manish Bapna, Executive Vice President & Managing Director, World Resources Institute (WRI)
2017–2018	Government of Georgia	Mukelani Dimba, Executive Director, Open Democracy Advice Centre (ODAC)
2018–2019	Government of Canada	Nathaniel Heller, Executive Vice President, Results for Development (R4D)
2019–2020	Government of Argentina	Robin Hodess, Director of Governance & Transparency, The B Team
2020–2021	Government of South Korea	María Baron, Global Executive Director, Directorio Legislativo
2021–2022	Government of Italy	Aidan Eyakuze, Executive Director, Twaweza
2022–2023	Government of Estonia	Anabel Cruz, Founder Director, Institute for Communication and Development
2023–2024	Government of Kenya	Blair Glencorse, Co-CEO, Accountability Lab
2024–2025	Government of Spain	Cielo Magno, Bantay Kita - PWYP Philippines
2025–2026	Government of Brazil	Stephanie Muchai
2026–2027	Government of United Kingdom	Laura Neuman, Senior Advisor, The Carter Center

=== Steering Committee ===
The OGP Steering Committee provides guidance and direction at the international level in order to maintain the highest standards for the initiative and ensure its long-term sustainability. It is composed of equal numbers of representatives of governments and civil society organizations. OGP's leadership regularly rotates by appointing a new government co-chair and a new civil society co-chair every year. Incoming government and civil society members of the steering committee are selected by their peers.

==== Subcommittees ====
Members of the OGP Steering Committee delegate work to the OGP sub-committees. There are three sub-committees: 1) Governance and Leadership; 2) Criteria and Standards; and 3) Thematic Leadership. The principle of parity is preserved in the sub-committees, as an equal number of government and civil society representatives serve in each one.

=== OGP Support Unit ===
The OGP Support Unit is a small, permanent secretariat that works closely with the steering committee to advance the goals of the OGP. It is designed to maintain institutional memory, manage OGP's external communications, ensure the continuity of organizational relationships with OGP's partners, and support the broader membership. It also serves as a neutral third party between governments and civil society organizations, ensuring that OGP maintains a productive balance between the two constituencies.

=== Independent Reporting Mechanism ===
The Independent Reporting Mechanism (IRM) is the key means by which all stakeholders can track OGP progress in participating countries. The IRM produces biannual independent progress reports for each country participating in the OGP. Progress reports assess governments on the development and implementation of their OGP action plans as well as their progress in upholding open government principles. The reports also provide technical recommendations for improvements. These reports are intended to stimulate dialogue and promote accountability between member governments and citizens.

=== International Experts Panel ===
The International Experts Panel (IEP) oversees the IRM by helping to ensure the quality of the reviews, assess procedures, and promote findings.

== Membership ==
=== National members ===
Country	Joined in	Geographic location	Notes
Albania	2011	Europe	
Argentina	2012	Americas	
Armenia	2011	Europe	
Australia	2015	Asia-Pacific	
Benin	2025	Africa and Middle East	
Bosnia and Herzegovina	2014	Europe	
Brazil	2011	Americas	Founder
Bulgaria	2011	Europe	
Burkina Faso	2016	Africa and Middle East	
Canada	2011	Americas	
Cape Verde	2015	Africa and Middle East	
Chile	2011	Americas	
Colombia	2011	Americas	
Costa Rica	2012	Americas	
Croatia	2011	Europe	
Czech Republic	2011	Europe	
Dominican Republic	2011	Americas	
Ecuador	2018	Americas	
Estonia	2011	Europe	
Finland	2012	Europe	
France	2014	Europe	
Germany	2016	Europe	
Ghana	2011	Africa and Middle East	
Greece	2011	Europe	
Guatemala	2011	Americas	
Honduras	2011	Americas	
Indonesia	2011	Asia-Pacific	Founder
Ireland	2013	Europe	
Italy	2011	Europe	
Ivory Coast	2015	Africa and Middle East	
Jamaica	2016	Americas	
Jordan	2011	Africa and Middle East	
Kenya	2011	Africa and Middle East	
Kosovo	2023	Europe	Non-voting member
Latvia	2011	Europe	
Liberia	2011	Africa and Middle East	
Lithuania	2011	Europe	
Malawi	2013	Africa and Middle East	
Maldives	2024	Asia-Pacific	
Malta	2011	Europe	
Mexico	2011	Americas	Founder
Moldova	2011	Europe	
Mongolia	2013	Asia-Pacific	
Montenegro	2011	Europe	
Morocco	2018	Africa and Middle East	
Netherlands	2011	Europe	
New Zealand	2013	Asia-Pacific	
Nigeria	2016	Africa and Middle East	
North Macedonia	2011	Europe	
Norway	2011	Europe	Founder
Panama	2012	Americas	
Papua New Guinea	2015	Asia-Pacific	
Paraguay	2011	Americas	
Peru	2011	Americas	
Philippines	2011	Asia-Pacific	Founder
Portugal	2017	Europe	
Romania	2011	Europe	
Senegal	2018	Africa and Middle East	
Serbia	2012	Europe	
Seychelles	2018	Africa and Middle East	
Sierra Leone	2013	Africa and Middle East	
Slovakia	2011	Europe	
South Africa	2011	Africa and Middle East	Founder
South Korea	2011	Asia-Pacific	
Spain	2011	Europe	
Sweden	2011	Europe	
Thailand	2026	Asia-Pacific	
Timor-Leste	2023	Asia-Pacific	
Tunisia	2014	Africa and Middle East	
Ukraine	2011	Europe	
United Kingdom	2011	Europe	Founder
Uruguay	2011	Americas	
Zambia	2024	Africa and Middle East	

=== Local members ===
Name of local jurisdiction	Type of local jurisdiction	Country	Joined in	Geographic location
Abuja	City	Nigeria	2020	Africa and Middle East
Agadir	City	Morocco	2024	Africa and Middle East
Anloga District	District	Ghana	2022	Africa and Middle East
Antigua Guatemala	City	Guatemala	2024	Americas
Aragón	Autonomous community	Spain	2020	Europe
Armavir	Municipality	Armenia	2022	Europe
Asturias	Autonomous community	Spain	2022	Europe
Athens	City	Greece	2024	Europe
Austin, Texas	City	United States	2016	Americas
Baguio	City	Philippines	2024	Asia-Pacific
Banggai	Regency	Indonesia	2020	Asia-Pacific
Banská Bystrica	City	Slovakia	2020	Europe
Bar	Municipality	Montenegro	2024	Europe
Basque Country	Autonomous community	Spain	2018	Europe
Béni Mellal-Khénifra	Region	Morocco	2022	Africa and Middle East
Bishkek	Municipality	Kyrgyzstan	2020	Asia-Pacific
Bogotá	City	Colombia	2020	Americas
Brebes	Regency	Indonesia	2020	Asia-Pacific
Buenos Aires	City	Argentina	2016	Americas
Cajamarca Region	Region	Peru	2024	Americas
Cartagena de Indias	City	Colombia	2022	Americas
Catalonia	Autonomous community	Spain	2020	Europe
Chihuahua City	City	Mexico	2022	Americas
Contagem	Municipality	Brazil	2022	Americas
Córdoba	City	Argentina	2020	Americas
Córdoba Province	Province	Argentina	2020	Americas
Corrientes	City	Argentina	2022	Americas
Curridabat	District	Costa Rica	2020	Americas
Dakar	CIty	Senegal	2024	Africa and Middle East
Dar Chaabane El Fehri	Municipality	Tunisia	2024	Africa and Middle East
Detmold	City	Germany	2022	Europe
Drâa-Tafilalet + Laâyoune-Sakia El Hamra + Oriental + Souss-Massa	Consortium of regions	Morocco	2024	Africa and the Middle East
El Kef	Municipality	Tunisia	2020	Africa and Middle East
Elbasan	City	Albania	2020	Europe
Elgeyo-Marakwet County	County	Kenya	2016	Africa and Middle East
Fuvamulah	City	Maldives	2024	Asia-Pacific
Gjakova	City	Kosovo	2024	Europe
Glasgow	Municipality	United Kingdom	2020	Europe
Goiás State	State	Brazil	2024	Americas
Greater Karak	Governorate	Jordan	2020	Africa and Middle East
Greater Manchester Combined Authority	Combined Authority	United Kingdom	2024	Europe
Gyumri	Municipality	Armenia	2020	Europe
Hamburg	Municipality	Germany	2022	Europe
Jalisco	State	Mexico	2016	Americas
Kaduna State	State	Nigeria	2018	Africa and Middle East
Kakamega	City	Kenya	2024	Africa and Middle East
Ketu South Municipal District	Municipal district	Ghana	2022	Africa and Middle East
Khmelnytskyi	Municipality	Ukraine	2020	Europe
Khoni	Municipality	Georgia	2020	Europe
Kisela Voda	Municipality	North Macedonia	2024	Europe
Kyiv	City	Ukraine	2024	Europe
La Paz	City	Bolivia	2024	Americas
Larena	Municipality	Philippines	2024	Asia-Pacific
Leova	City	Moldova	2024	Europe
Lima	City	Peru	2020	Americas
Lisbon	City	Portugal	2024	Europe
Los Angeles	City	United States	2020	Americas
Machakos	Municipality	Kenya	2024	Africa and Middle East
Madiun	City	Indonesia	2024	Asia-Pacific
Madrid	City	Spain	2016	Europe
Maipú	Municipality	Chile	2022	Americas
Makueni	County	Kenya	2020	Africa and Middle East
Mar del Plata	City	Argentina	2024	Americas
Medellín	City	Colombia	2024	Americas
Mendoza	City	Argentina	2020	Americas
Metsamor	Municipality	Armenia	2024	Europe
Modriča	Municipality	Bosnia and Herzegovina	2024	Europe
Monterrey Municipality	Municipality	Mexico	2022	Americas
Montevideo	City	Uruguay	2022	Americas
Nairobi	City	Kenya	2020	Africa and Middle East
Nandi County	County	Kenya	2020	Africa and Middle East
Navarre	Autonomous community	Spain	2024	Europe
New York City	City	United States	2024	Americas
Northern Ireland		United Kingdom	2020	Europe
Novi Pazar	City	Serbia	2022	Europe
Nuevo León	State	Mexico	2022	Americas
Ontario	Province	Canada	2016	Americas
Orzhytsia + Zviahel	Consortium of cities	Ukraine	2024	Europe
Osasco	Municipality	Brazil	2020	Americas
Osh	City	Kyrgyzstan	2024	Asia-Pacific
Ouellé	Municipality	Côte d'Ivoire	2024	Africa and Middle East
Ozurgeti	City	Georgia	2020	Europe
Paris	City	France	2016	Europe
Pastaza	Province	Ecuador	2024	Americas
Peñalolén	Municipality	Chile	2020	Americas
Pichincha	Province	Ecuador	2024	Americas
Plateau State	State	Nigeria	2020	Africa and Middle East
Plav	Municipality	Montenegro	2024	Europe
Pristina	City	Kosovo	2024	Europe
Québec	Province	Canada	2020	Americas
Quezon City	City	Philippines	2024	Asia-Pacific
Quintana Roo	State	Mexico	2020	Americas
Quito	City	Ecuador	2020	Americas
Río Branco	City	Uruguay	2024	Americas
Rosario	City	Argentina	2020	Americas
Salcedo	City	Dominican Republic	2022	Americas
San Jerónimo	Municipality	Guatemala	2024	Americas
San Joaquín	City	Chile	2024	Americas
Santa Catarina	State	Brazil	2020	Americas
San Pedro Garza García	Municipality	Mexico	2022	Americas
Santiago + Renca	Consortium of cities	Chile	2024	Americas
Santo Domingo de los Tsáchilas	Province	Ecuador	2020	Americas
São Paulo	City	Brazil	2016	Americas
Sarchí	Canton	Costa Rica	2022	Americas
Scotland		United Kingdom	2016	Europe
Sekondi-Takoradi	City	Ghana	2016	Africa and Middle East
Semarang	City	Indonesia	2020	Asia-Pacific
Shama	City	Ghana	2020	Africa and Middle East
South Cotabato	Province	Philippines	2018	Asia-Pacific
Tagbilaran	City	Philippines	2024	Asia-Pacific
Tamale	City	Ghana	2024	Africa and Middle East
Tangier – Tetouan – Al Hoceima	Region	Morocco	2020	Africa and Middle East
Tarkwa-Nsuaem	Municipal district	Ghana	2022	Africa and Middle East
Ternopil	Municipality	Ukraine	2020	Europe
Tétouan	Municipality	Tunisia	2022	Africa and Middle East
Timișoara	City	Romania	2020	Europe
Tlajomulco de Zúñiga	Municipality	Mexico	2022	Americas
Topoľčany	Municipality	Slovakia	2024	Europe
Travnik	Municipality	Bosnia and Herzegovina	2024	Europe
Valencian Community	Autonomous community	Spain	2022	Europe
Valongo	Municipality	Portugal	2024	Europe
Vanadzor	Municipality	Armenia	2020	Europe
Villanueva	Municipality	Honduras	2024	Americas
Vinnytsia	City	Ukraine	2020	Europe
Vitória da Conquista	Municipality	Brazil	2024	Americas
Wassa Amenfi East	Municipal district	Ghana	2022	Africa and Middle East
West Java	Province	Indonesia	2024	Asia-Pacific
West Nusa Tenggara	Province	Indonesia	2020	Asia-Pacific
West Sumbawa	Regency	Indonesia	2020	Asia-Pacific
Yerevan	City	Armenia	2022	Europe
Yoff	Municipality	Senegal	2024	Africa and Middle East
Yogyakarta	City	Indonesia	2024	Asia-Pacific
Žabljak	Municipality	Montenegro	2024	Europe
Zagreb	City	Croatia	2024	Europe
Žilina Region	Region	Slovakia	2022	Europe
Zriba	Municipality	Tunisia	2024	Africa and Middle East

=== Eligibility Criteria ===
In order to participate in OGP, governments must exhibit a demonstrated commitment to open government in four key areas, as measured by objective indicators and validated by independent experts. The four critical areas of open government are: fiscal transparency, access to information, asset disclosure, and citizen engagement. Countries can earn a total of 16 points for their performance in these four metrics, or 12 points if they are not measured in one of the metrics. Countries that earn 75% of the applicable points (either 12 out of 16 or 9 out of 12) or more are eligible to join. For an eligible country to join, all that is required is a letter from a ministerial representative indicating agreement with the Open Government Declaration and intent to participate in the OGP, as well as the leading agency and an individual point of contact for future work.

The following countries are eligible, but have yet to express interest to join the partnership as of June 2026.

Eligible country	Geographic location
Austria	Europe
Belgium	Europe
Bhutan	Asia-Pacific
Denmark	Europe
Guyana	Americas
Hungary	Europe
Iceland	Europe
Israel	Europe
Japan	Asia-Pacific
Luxembourg	Europe
Namibia	Africa and the Middle East
Nepal	Asia-Pacific
Pakistan	Asia-Pacific
Poland	Europe
Slovenia	Europe
Sri Lanka	Asia-Pacific
Switzerland	Europe
Tanzania	Africa and the Middle East
Trinidad and Tobago	Americas
United States	Americas

=== Former member countries ===
Country	Year of entry	Year of exit	Reason
Turkey	2011	2016	Inactivity
Hungary	2012	2016	Request of its government
Tanzania	2011	2017	Inactivity
Trinidad and Tobago	2016	2019	Inactivity
Pakistan	2016	2022	Inactivity
Luxembourg	2016	2023	Request of its government
El Salvador	2011	2023	Inactivity
Azerbaijan	2011	2023	Permanently suspended by the OGP Steering Committee
Denmark	2011	2024	Request of its government
Kyrgyzstan	2017	2025	Inactivity
Sri Lanka	2015	2025	Inactivity
Afghanistan	2017	2025	Inactivity
United States	2011	2026	Request of its government
Israel	2011	2026	Request of its government
Georgia	2011	2026	Permanently suspended by the OGP Steering Committee

== Mechanism ==
=== Co-creation ===
OGP participating countries co-create a National Action Plan (NAP) with civil society. The action plans are "the driving device" for OGP, as they are the instrument through which government and civil society develop their agreed reforms, or commitments, every two years. The set of commitments aims to advance transparency, accountability, participation, and/or technological innovation. Countries, with the active involvement of civil society, are encouraged to tackle new and ambitious commitments as well as build upon past successes. An effective public consultation process during the development of action plans can help build broad support for commitments with a wider set of actors to rely on for successful implementation. OGP participating countries operate on a two-year action plan calendar cycle, whereby countries are continuously implementing their programs. The government must regularly report on its progress and work with civil society to monitor and achieve the agreed-upon reforms. Progress is evaluated at regular intervals by an independent researcher appointed by the OGP's Independent Reporting Mechanism.

=== OGP Local ===
Launched in 2016 as the sub-national pilot program, OGP Local seeks to extend the principles of OGP to the local level. A total of 15 sub-national governments were selected to participate in the pilot program and, with the support of the OGP Support Unit and steering committee, have developed national action plans in collaboration with civil society. They will actively contribute to peer learning and networking activities with other sub-national governments and, like OGP's member countries, will be assessed by the IRM. The cohort later expanded to 20 before further expansion in October 2020, with 56 new local jurisdictions added to the program. In 2022, 30 new more local jurisdictions joined OGP Local. In 2024, additional 55 local jurisdictions joined the OGP Local program.

=== Open Parliament ===
As OGP continued to expand, engagement with legislative institutions also became more prevalent. In some OGP-participating countries, open parliament has become a particularly significant part of the push for more open government, although commitments related to parliamentary transparency, public participation, and accountability are not always co-created in the same process as the country's OGP action plan. The open parliament initiative also benefits from strategic collaborations with the Open Parliament e-Network (OPeN), a global consortium of organizations focused on parliamentary engagement. As of 2020, its members are the Directorio Legislativo, the Westminster Foundation for Democracy (WFD), the National Democratic Institute (NDI), ParlAmericas, Red Latinoamericana por la Transparencia Legislativa (RedLTL), and the OSCE Office for Democratic Institutions and Human Rights.

== OGP Global Summits ==
OGP participants gather regularly at regional and global events to share their findings in person and to strengthen international cooperation. The most significant of these events has been the Global Summit, held annually since 2012. At the 2013 Global Summit, the steering committee voted to skip the 2014 Summit and reconvene in 2015. In addition to providing spaces where participating countries and civil society groups could share information in person, OGP wanted to find a way to showcase the standout efforts of global transparency leaders.

Year	Event	Host	Dates
2012	The 1st OGP Annual Meeting	Brasília, Brazil	April 17–18, 2012
2013	The 2nd OGP Annual Meeting	London, United Kingdom	October 31–November 1, 2013
2015	The 3rd OGP Global Summit	Mexico City, Mexico	October 28–29, 2015
2016	The 4th OGP Global Summit	Paris, France	December 7–8, 2016
2018	The 5th OGP Global Summit	Tbilisi, Georgia	July 18–19, 2018
2019	The 6th OGP Global Summit	Ottawa, Canada	May 29–30, 2019
2021	The 7th OGP Global Summit	Seoul, South Korea	December 13–17, 2021
2023	The 8th OGP Global Summit	Tallinn, Estonia	September 6–7, 2023
2025	The 9th OGP Global Summit	Vitoria-Gasteiz, Spain	October 7-9, 2025

=== Open Government Awards ===
OGP established the Open Government Awards to showcase standout efforts and notable initiatives advancing open government worldwide.

Year	Theme	Category	Winner
2014	Citizen Engagement	Gold Awards	Denmark | Statutory Elected Senior Citizens’ Council; Montenegro | Be Responsible, Zero Grey Economy; Philippines | Grassroots Participatory Budgeting
2014	Citizen Engagement	Silver Awards	Italy | OpenCoesione-Monithon; Netherlands | MijnWOZ: My Law on Appreciating Local Property; United Kingdom | Sciencewise
2014	Citizen Engagement	Bronze Awards	Mexico | Centro de Integración Ciudadana; Peru | Children of Miraflores; United States | Collaboration and Innovation through Prizes, Crowdsourcing, and Citizen Science; France | data.gouv.fr
2015	Improving Public Services	Overall Awards	Uruguay | ATuServicio.uy; Indonesia| The Guiding Lights of the Archipelago; United Kingdom | Neighborhood Planning
2015	Improving Public Services	Regional Awards	Tunisia | Tunisia Online e-Procurement System; Mexico | Stakeholder Participation in Day Care Center Safety; Armenia | Smart Municipality; Croatia | E-Citizens
2015	Improving Public Services	Special Recognition	Indonesia | The Guiding Lights of the Archipelago
2016	Making Transparency Count	Overall Awards	Ukraine | ProZorro: Bringing Government Procurement to the People; Indonesia | API Pemilu: Improving Access and Understanding of Elections Data; Honduras | Construction Sector Transparency Initiative Honduras: Better Infrastructure through Transparency
2016	Making Transparency Count	Regional Awards	Malawi | Construction Sector Transparency Initiative Malawi: Development through Transparency; Mexico | Budget Transparency Portal: Expenditure Tracking from the Executive to the Streets; Mongolia | Check My Service: Closing the Feedback Loop; Netherlands | OpenSpending: Reporting Directly to the Taxpayers
2016	Making Transparency Count	Special Recognition	Ukraine | ProZorro: Bringing Government Procurement to the People
2021	None	Impact Awards	Africa and the Middle East 1st place: Nigeria | Beneficial Ownership Transparency; 2nd place: Tunisia | Right to Information; 3rd place: Ghana | Open Data Initiative Americas 1st place: Panama | Hotline 311; 2nd place: Brazil | Innovations in Basic Education; 3rd place: Argentina | Active Transparency Index Asia and the Pacific 1st place: Philippines | Citizen Participatory Audit; 2nd place: Indonesia | Open E-Procurement; 3rd place: South Korea | National Core Data Release Program Europe 1st place: Ukraine | Transparent Sale of Public Assets; 2nd place: Serbia | Public Services on ePAPER; 3rd place: Ireland | Citizens’ Assembly; 3rd place: North Macedonia | Transparent & Accountable Local Government
2021	None	Local Innovation Awards	Africa and the Middle East; 1st place: Plateau, Nigeria | Increasing Transparency and Accountability in Extractives; 2nd place: Nandi, Kenya | Public Participation and Civic Engagement; 3rd place: Tangier – Tetouan – Al-Hoceima, Morocco | MEL Platform for Regional Development Americas; 1st place: Bogota, Colombia | Innovation and Participation in Health; 2nd place: Bogota, Colombia | Gender Parity in Open Government; 2nd place: São Paulo, Brazil | Citizen Monitoring of the Municipal Agenda 2030; 3rd place: Córdoba Province, Argentina | Localizing the 2030 Agenda Asia and the Pacific; 1st place: West Sumbawa, Indonesia | Forum for Consultation, Complaints, and Problem Solving; 2nd place: West Nusa Tenggara, Indonesia | Community Complaint Resolution; 3rd place: Semarang, Indonesia | Complaint Portal for Vulnerable Communities Europe; 1st place: Khmelnytskyi, Ukraine | Formation of the Green Course Action Plan; 2nd place: Tirana, Albania | WhatsApp Counselor; 3rd place: Vinnytsia, Ukraine | Liaison Offices for Citizen Participation
2023	Inspirational Reforms	National Awards	Africa & the Middle East; Ghana | Public Accounts Committee and Audit Reports Americas; Brazil | Panorama do Legislativo Municipal Asia-Pacific; Indonesia | Expanding Legal Aid for Vulnerable Persons and Groups Europe; Portugal | Transparency Plus Portal
2023	Inspirational Reforms	Local Awards	Africa & the Middle East; Nandi, Kenya | County Open Data Desk; Tarkwa-Nsuaem, Ghana | Youth Entrepreneurship and Women Empowerment Programme Americas; Contagem, Brazil | Aqui tem remédio Asia-Pacific; Yerevan, Armenia | Green Seal-Green Deal initiative Europe; Aragon, Spain | Gobierno Fácil; Glasgow, United Kingdom | Citizen Power
2023	Inspirational Reforms	Honorable Mentions	Mongolia | The E-Mongolia, Ministry of Digital Development and Communications Morocco | Open Local Government Support Program Slovak Republic | MuMap: Municipalities on Map
2025	Open Gov Challenge Awards	National Regional Awards	Africa & the Middle East; Nigeria | Advance Inclusive and Responsible Digital Governance Americas; Brazil | Federal Strategy for Social Participation and Popular Education Asia-Pacific; Philippines | Improve Data Availability, Interoperability, and Public Participation in Procurement Europe; United Kingdom | Build Public Dashboards for Open Contracting Data; Ukraine | Implement a Whole-of-Government Anti-Corruption Strategy
2025	Open Gov Challenge Awards	Local Regional Awards	Africa & the Middle East; Tangier, Morocco | Implement and Inclusive Participatory Budgeting Process Americas; Nuevo Leon, Mexico | Develop a Digital Platform for Public Participation Asia-Pacific; Quezon City, Philippines | Support Capacity Building for Civil Society to Participate in Governance Europe; Zagreb, Croatia | Implement a Citywide Participatory Budgeting Process
2025	Open Gov Challenge Awards	Thematic Awards	Access to Information; Nandi, Kenya | Make Information More Inclusive and Accessible Civic Space; Quezon City, Philippines | Support Capacity Building for Civil Society to Participate in Governance Climate and Environment; Philippines | Increase the Accessibility of Climate Finance Data Digital Governance; Nigeria | Advance Inclusive and Responsible Digital Governance Fiscal Openness; Zagreb, Croatia | Implement a Citywide Participatory Budgeting Process Gender and Inclusion; Metsamor, Armenia | Improve Youth Participation in Decision-Making Justice; Costa Rica | Co-Create a Participatory Framework for Restorative Justice Open Procurement; Philippines | Improve Data Availability, Interoperability, and Public Participation in Procurement Public Participation; Brazil | Federal Strategy for Social Participation and Popular Education
2025	Open Gov Challenge Awards	Honorable Mentions	Bogotá, Colombia | Improve Transparency and Monitoring of Public Works Projects Brazil | Open Contracting for Federal Infrastructure Projects; Córdoba Province, Argentina | Co-Create an Access to Information Law for the Province; Mendoza, Argentina | Launch a Digital Participatory Budget Program; Nuevo León, Mexico | Digitize the Public Procurement System; Philippines | Co-Create a Framework to Implement Local RTI Ordinances; Santiago de Cali, Colombia | Improve Public Monitoring of Debt and Investment; Uasin Gishu County, Kenya | Increase Fiscal Transparency and Participatory Budgeting

== See also ==
- Transparency International
- Transparency Directive
- Transparency (behavior)
- Open Data Partnership
- Corruption
- Corruption Perceptions Index
- Anti-corruption
