= Amado Castro =

Filipino broadcaster

Amado A. Castro (May 31, 1924 - June 10, 2017) was a Filipino economist and the first Dean of the University of the Philippines School of Economics (UPSE). He was also former Governor of the Development Bank of the Philippines.

== Early life and education ==
Castro was born on May 31, 1924. He obtained his Bachelor of Science in Business Administration (major in Economics) degree from the University of the Philippines in 1948, and his PhD in Economics from Harvard University in 1954. He was a member of the Upsilon Sigma Phi.

== Academic career ==
Castro joined the UP academe in 1948 as instructor in Economics at the College of Business Administration (CBA), eventually becoming the Head of the Department of Economics in June 1956.

He was Acting Dean of CBA in 1958 and Director of the Institute of Economic Development and Research from 1958 to 1966. He became Dean of the UP School of Economics from its founding in 1965 to 1973. In 1989, he retired from UPSE and served as a Professorial Lecturer at the University of Asia & the Pacific. He was also a founding member and former president of the Philippine Economic Society.

== Death ==
Castro died on June 10, 2017.
