= JC Punongbayan =

Filipino economist, professor, and columnist

Jan Carlo Borruel Punongbayan

Personal details
- Born: 30 July 1989 (age 37) Philippines
- Education: University of the Philippines Diliman
- Profession: Economist; Professor; Columnist

Jan Carlo "JC" Borruel Punongbayan is a Filipino economist, columnist, and assistant professor at the University of the Philippines Diliman.

Punongbayan is one of the 2023 Ten Outstanding Young Men Awardees. Punongbayan, together with Jefferson Arapoc and Marianne Vital, co-founded Usapang Econ, a Philippine educational blog, podcast, and social media platform that aims to explain economic concepts in a clear, engaging, and accessible manner for the general public.

== Education ==
Punongbayan graduated summa cum laude with a Bachelor of Science in economics from the University of the Philippines School of Economics (UPSE) in 2009. He finished his master's degree in economics at the UPSE in 2013.

Under his adviser Karl Robert L. Jandoc, Punongbayan wrote his dissertation titled "Essays in market design and college admissions" and obtained a Doctor of Philosophy in Economics also at the UPSE in 2021.

== Career ==
Punongbayan teaches Economics at the UPSE and has served various positions in the university. He writes a regular column at Rappler.
