= Open Data Partnership =

The Open Government Partnership (OGP) is a new multilateral initiative introduced by the United States Government that aims to secure concrete commitments from governments to promote transparency, empower citizens, fight corruption, and harness new technologies to strengthen governance by means of Open Data Platforms. In the spirit of multi-stakeholder collaboration, OGP is overseen by a steering committee of governments, civil society organizations and the developer community.
