= University of the Philippines School of Economics =

Coordinates: 14°39′21″N 121°4′24″E

University of the Philippines Diliman School of Economics
- Unibersidad ng Pilipinas Diliman; Paaralan ng Ekonomiya
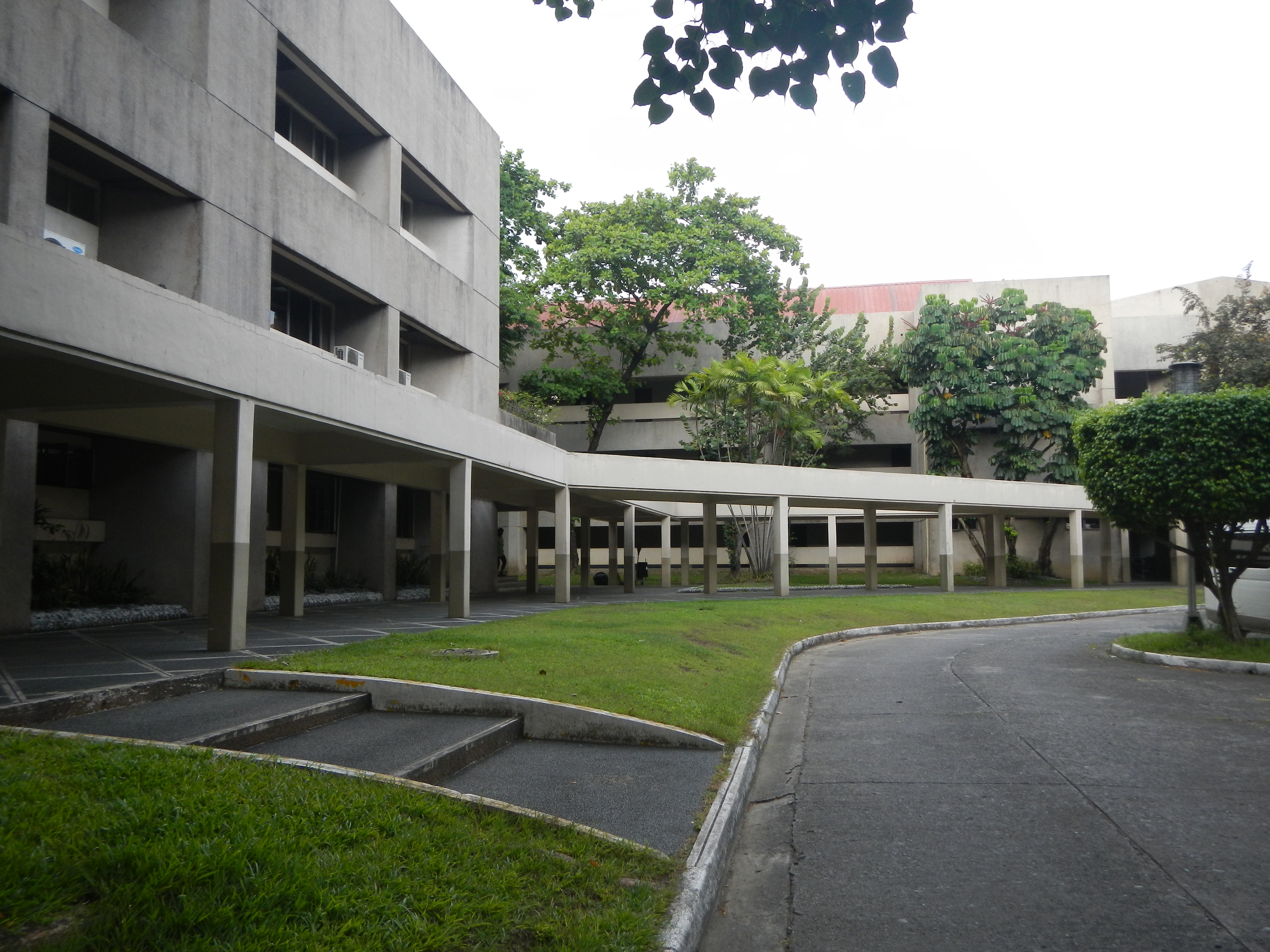
- Façade of the School of Economics
- Type: Public University; Research University; Degree-granting unit of the University of the Philippines Diliman
- Established: 1965
- Parent institution: University of the Philippines Diliman
- Dean: Ma. Joy V. Abrenica, Ph.D.
- Department Chair: Aleli D. Kraft
- Academic staff: 17 full time
- Students: 646 (as of 1st Semester, AY 2023 – 2024)
- Undergraduates: 571
- Postgraduates: 57
- Doctoral students: 18
- Location: Guerrero corner Osmeña Streets, Diliman, Quezon City, Philippines
- Website: www.econ.upd.edu.ph
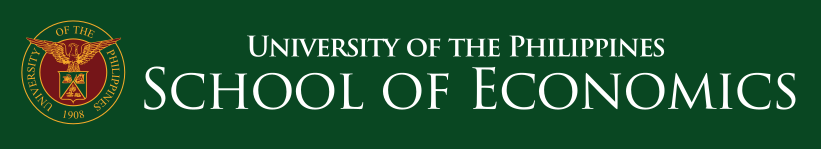

The University of the Philippines Diliman School of Economics (UPSE) is a degree-granting unit of the University of the Philippines Diliman specializing in the study of economics. Established in 1965, the School of Economics was chosen as the first and only CHED Center for Excellence in Economics in the Philippines in 1999.

As of September 2024, the School was among the top 5% (ranked 238) of economics departments in the world based on the strength of its graduate research in the fields of Economics and Finance, as ranked by RePEc.

Multiple Socioeconomic Planning Secretaries and Directors-General of the National Economic and Development Authority have hailed from the school such as Gerardo Sicat, Solita Collas-Monsod, Dante Canlas, Emmanuel Esguerra, and Felipe Medalla.

Faculty research is particularly strong in the areas of health economics, public economics, and development economics. In collaboration with the Philippine Economic Society, the school publishes the Philippine Review of Economics, a leading journal of economics-related research in the Philippines.

The 9th and current dean of the School of Economics is Prof. Ma. Joy V. Abrenica, Ph.D. She was appointed in 2021 for a term for 3 years.

== History ==
=== Department of Economics ===
The School of Economics traces its origins to the Department of Economics established in 1926 under the College of Liberal Arts (CLA). Alongside its focus on economic studies, the department also offered the degree of Bachelor of Science in Commerce as a two-year course.

Three years later in 1929, the department was detached from the CLA upon the establishment of the School of Business Administration, which would be elevated into a college in 1934.

The Department of Economics was financially and academically supported by institutions like the Rockefeller Foundation and the Ford Foundation. Visiting professors such as Karl William Kapp and Vernon Ruttan from the Rockefeller Foundation, and John H. Power and Harry Oshima from the Ford Foundation were indispensable to the department.

Additional visiting professors such as Jeffrey G. Williamson and Leon Mears would offer their services to the department.

Contention would later happen, however, upon the establishment of the Institute of Economic Development and Research which functioned as the economic research wing of UP. Though separate units of UP, instructors and professors under the department also held positions in the institute, which sparked calls for the detachment of the department from the College of Business Administration.

The Department of Economics initially specialized solely in baccalaureate programs in economics, immersing students with economic problems in the Philippines. Graduate studies in economics were often taken in foreign universities upon financial backing. Foreign exchange programs to universities like Harvard, Columbia, and MIT would be funded by the Rockefeller Foundation.

In 1963, the Director of the IEDR, Amado Castro, and the Chair of the Department of Economics, José "Pepe" Encarnación Jr., would push for a homegrown graduate studies program, up to the doctorate level, at the department.

In early 1964, a one-year UP-University of Wisconsin Program in Development Economics specializing in basic skills in development economics would be financed by the Ford Foundation.

Many of the graduates of the time would serve in what would become the National Economic and Development Authority and the Philippine Institute for Development Studies.

=== School of Economics as an Academic Degree Granting Unit ===
Recommended by the Dean of the College of Business Administration, Cesar Virata, and endorsed by U.P. President Carlos P. Romulo, the School of Economics was established in 1965 as a degree-granting unit upon the merger of the Department of Economics and the Institute of Economic Development and Research (IEDR). Amado Castro would serve as the first Dean of the School of Economics from its founding, until his resignation in 1974.

Following the foundation of the School of Economics as an independent unit, the IEDR would be restructured into the Economics Research Center (ERC) to coordinate research activities within the school. The ERC focuses on collaborative research between the school faculty, graduate students, and other scholars, associateships with visiting scholars, and coordination with government agencies and international bodies through the school faculty.

In 1974, José Encarnación Jr. became the dean of the school, and would serve until 1994, making him the longest-serving dean of the school.

In the same year, the Philippine Center for Economic Development (PCED) was established to provide research, training, teaching and other programs in support of the School of Economics.

Financed by PCED, the School of Economics would move to its current location along Osmeña Avenue in 1977. The school's two buildings, the Diosdado P. Macapagal Hall (often referred to as the Library Building) and the José "Pepe" Encarnación Jr. Hall, were designed by Carlos Arguelles.

In the 80s, the school would establish the Health Economics Program (HEP) as a specialization for its graduate students. Organized by Dr. Alejandro N. Herrin, the program sought to train graduates in health economic issues, undertake health-related economics policy research, and disseminate information generated through HEP research. The HEP is supervised and implemented by the Health Economics Program Committee, consisting of faculty members specializing in health economics.

The HEP offers electives specializing in health economics both at the undergraduate and graduate levels. The health committee members have also helped generate research and policy modules for use by national and local health workers under the Department of Health (DOH), including the World Bank-DOH Flagship Course on Sustainable Financing and the DOH Introductory Course on Principles of Health Systems Reform. HEP members have also contributed to international policy research projects such as the WB/DOH-Philippine Institute for Development Studies (PIDS)– Philippine Health Development Program (1990–1995)which generated research on healthcare financing and the United States Agency for International Development (USAID)-funded Health Policy Development Program (1992–1996) which led to the creation of the National Health Insurance Act which established PhilHealth.

=== School of Economics in the 21st Century ===
In March 2020, in response to the implementation of the Enhanced Community Quarantine in Luzon to mitigate the COVID-19 pandemic, Alfredo Paloyo of the University of Wollongong, and School of Economics faculty Cielo Magno, Karl Jandoc, Laarni Escresa, Maria Christina Epetia, Maria Socorro Bautista, and Emmanuel de Dios argued that the initial ₱27.1 billion fiscal stimulus packaged proposed by President Rodrigo Duterte was insufficient as the government should invest more to mitigate the effects of the community quarantine. They specified that the government focus on programs such as distribution of cash and non-cash aid to the poor, moratorium on foreclosures and utility payments, extension of sick leaves, loans for small to medium businesses, mass testing, relaxation of tariffs and other barriers on PPE, takeovers of hotels and other accommodation services, financial support to farmers and other affected industries to increase hospital bed capacity, totaling ₱100 to 300 billion.

From May 15 to November 17, 2023, the School of Economics and the PCED would host a lecture series titled "PCED@50 Lecture Series: 50 Years of Economic Policy-making." to be delivered by former NEDA Directors-General Gerardo Sicat, Solita Monsod, Cielito Habito, Felipe Medalla, and Dante Canlas and former NEDA Secretary Ernesto Pernia and incumbent Arsenio Balisacan.

On May 17, 2024, the Philippine Center for Economic Development would formally celebrate its 50th founding anniversary. Surviving PCED founding members Gerardo Sicat, Cesar Virata, and Jaime Laya joined the current PCED Chair, Arsenio Balisacan, the Department of Budget and Management Secretary Amenah Pangandaman, UP President Angelo Jimenez, and PCED Executive Director and UPSE Dean Joy V. Abrenica in marking PCED's golden anniversary.

In response to the soon approval of the Maharlika Investment Fund (MIF) by President Bongbong Marcos, and the proposed remittance of Land Bank and the Development Bank of the Philippines capital to fund the MIF, 21 professors of the school published a paper entitled "Maharlika Investment Fund: Still Beyond Repair" in June 2023 arguing against the investment fund. They highlighted 6 key issues with the then-proposed legislation:

1. lack of focus on whether the MIF served as a sovereign wealth fund or a national development fund;
2. Encroachment on government budgetary processes;
3. Lack of money sources for the MIF and its corresponding moral hazard;
4. Lack of administrative independence among the appointed board of directors;
5. Presently high interest rate which can hamper investments; and
6. Diverts attention from more urgent national issues such as retirement and pension reform for military personnel.

In a forum held by the school in August 2023, Finance Secretary Benjamin E. Diokno detailed his position against the "unsustainable" Republic Act 10931 or the Universal Access to Quality Tertiary Education Act of 2017 which mandated that all State Universities and Colleges (SUCs) in the country offer free tuition. Diokno elaborated that in his experience as the Budget Secretary and former Bangko Sentral Governor, the law was "anti-poor" as more poor students didn't attend college. He added that improvement of the basic education system should be prioritized over maintaining free college tuition to increase student's odds of gaining entry into SUCs.

== Deans of the School of Economics ==
The Dean of the School of Economics is the presiding officer of the school and is appointed by the Board of Regents upon the recommendation of the Chancellor and the President of the University.

They are appointed to a term of 3 years from the date of their appointment, and shall continue their term until the appointment of their successor. A nominal term limit of 2 terms is allowed, however, they may be permitted more than 2 terms in "highly exceptional cases."

1. Amado Castro (1965–1974)
2. José Encarnación Jr. (1974–1994)
3. Felipe M. Medalla (1994–1998)
4. Raul V. Fabella (1998 - 2007)
5. Emmanuel S. de Dios (2007 - 2010)
6. Arsenio M. Balisacan (2010 - 2012)
7. Ramon L. Clarete (2012 - 2015)
8. Orville Jose C. Solon (2015 - 2021)
9. Ma. Joy V. Abrenica (2021–present)

== Rules on Scholastic Standing ==
The University of the Philippines implements a grade point scale with the requirement that all baccalaureate students achieve a General Weighted Average (GWA) of no less than 3.00 (on a scale of 1.00 to 5.00, with 4.00 as conditional failure, and 5.00 as failed) at the end of each semester.

The School of Economics, meanwhile, sets the minimum grade to pass a course to 2.50. Additionally, students must achieve a minimum Cumulative Weighted Average of 2.50, or they are dismissed from the school. Additionally, all BS Econ and BS BE students are required to pass Econ 106 (Elements of Mathematical Economics) and Econ 131 (Quantitative Economics) within 4 semesters of enrolling in Econ 101 (Macroeconomics I) or Econ 102 (Microeconomics I), inclusive of the semester they enrolled in Econ 101 or 102.

For graduate studies, the minimum Cumulative Weighted Average is 2.00 for MA Econ and MDE econ students, and 1.75 for PhD students, according to University rules.

== Economics Research Center ==
Following the creation of the School of Economics as an independent unit of the university, the IEDR, as the research wing of the former department, was restructured into the Economics Research Center to balance the teaching and research activities of the school. The ECR oversees visiting research associateships, research seminars, and publications in support of the school.

To meet the interests of the school faculty and the needs of the government in policy making and planning, the ERC specializes in policy research in the areas of international trade and finance, fiscal management, income and poverty distribution, regional and rural development, resource and environmental economics, growth and development, economic theory, and econometrics. Collaborative research can be undertaken by school faculty, alongside graduate students and other scholars, in the field of economics, mathematics, operations research, etc.

Through the school faculty, the ERC works with institutions such as the World Bank, World Health Organization, Food and Agriculture Organization, Asian Development Bank, National Economic and Development Authority (NEDA), Department of Agriculture, and the Department of Trade and Industry. The ERC also undertakes policy research and analysis for members of Congress and other government officials.

Foreign scholars, such as PhD candidates and professors and researchers in the field of economics, can also visit the school to perform research focusing on Philippine economic development using the facilities and services of the school.

The ERC also holds regular research seminars focusing on economic developments in the Philippines and other developing countries and economic research methods.

== University of the Philippines School of Economics Library ==
University of the Philippines School of Economics Library
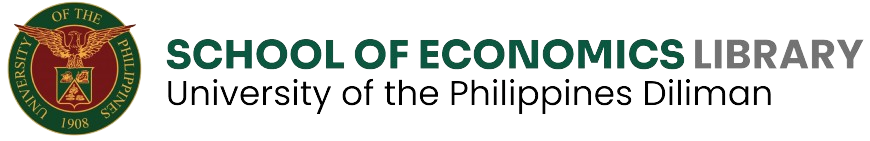
- Location: 2nd and 3rd floor, Library Building, Guerrero corner Osmeña Street, Diliman, Quezon City
- Established: 1965

Collection
- Size: 109,112 Books, Non-books, and Serials

Access and use
- Population served: UPSE Students, UP System and Diliman students, UP Alumni, and upon request, Government Researchers, Private Researchers, and Undergraduates

Other information
- Website: https://selib.upd.edu.ph

The University of the Philippines School of Economics Library (SELib) is a closed-stack library established alongside the school in 1965. It traces its origins to the collection held by the former Institute of Economic Development and Research, whose collection was transferred to the School of Economics Library.

Much of the collection held by the IEDR was financed by the Rockefeller Foundation in 1957. The early collection under the IEDR was housed in Benton Hall, the former site of the IEDR, and now present site of the Center for International Studies.

During the early years of the library, Belen Angeles served as the Head Librarian, and would later serve as the University Librarian. Brian Lloyd B. Dayrit currently serves as the Head Librarian.

The School of Economics Library is open to all students of the School of Economics, students within UP Diliman and the UP System. On appointment basis, the library also accepts government researchers, private researchers, and graduates and undergraduates from other universities.

As of 2021, SELib houses 108,511 books and non-books, and 601 serials, across 4 sections:

- Circulation and Reserve Books section
- Reference section
- General Circulation section
- Filipiniana and Serials section

SELib also houses other facilities, such as:

- OPAC and Datasets Terminals
- Main Reading Area
- Bangko Sentral ng Pilipinas Knowledge Center
- Discussion Rooms
- Archives Room
- Workrooms for the School's publications

As of September 2024, the 3rd floor discussion rooms as well as the Filipiniana and Serials Section housed on the floor are unavailable to give way to renovations.

== Philippine Center for Economic Development ==
Philippine Center for Economic Development
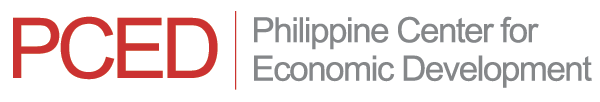
- Established: 1974
- Mission: Through the support of the Center, a University of the Philippines School of Economics (UPSE) that is able to perform its academic functions at a larger scale, ultimately contributing to the country's continuing and accelerating efforts at national development.
- Chair: Arsenio M. Balisacan
- Executive Director: Ma. Joy V. Abrenica
- Key people: Jose B. Fernandez Jr., Gregorio S. Licaros, Vicente T. Paterno, Gerardo P. Sicat, José Encarnación, Jr., Onofre D. Corpuz, Cesar E.A. Virata, and Jaime C. Laya
- Address: Encarnacion Hall, School of Economics, University of the Philippines Diliman, Quezon City
- Website: https://www.pced.gov.ph

The Philippine Center for Economic Development (PCED) was founded in 1974 to provide research, training, teaching and other programs in support of the School of Economics.

The idea for a supporting organization for the school was first conceptualized by Gerardo P. Sicat, an associate professor of the school and the then-Chairman of the National Economic Board, as a way of providing financial support to the school and to supplement its meager resources. Sicat's initial idea would be scrapped upon Encarnación's insistence that the faculty of the school be able to conduct their own research in their fields of interests. However, the concept of an organization supporting the school was revived through Stephen R. Lewis, a consultant recruited by Sicat, who proposed the PCED, which functioned more as a foundation that the typical research institutes and centers of UP.

The PCED was established by Presidential Decree 453, signed on May 13, 1974, by President Ferdinand Marcos. The PCED was also established as a trust to maintain funds for the benefit of the school in the long term.

8 people were central to the establishment of the PCED:

1. Jose B. Fernandez Jr. – Governor of the Central Bank (1984–1990)
2. Gregorio S. Licaros – Governor of the Central Bank (1970–1981)
3. Vicente T. Paterno – Secretary (later Minister) of Industry (1974–1979)
4. Gerardo P. Sicat – Director-General of the National Economic and Development Authority (1973–1981)
5. José Encarnación Jr. – Dean of the School of Economics (1974–1994)
6. Onofre D. Corpuz – Secretary of Education (1967–1971), Minister of Education and Culture (later including Sports) (1979–84), President of the University of the Philippines (1975–1979)
7. Cesar E.A. Virata – Prime Minister of the Philippines (1981–1986)
8. Jaime C. Laya – Governor of the Central Bank (1981–1984)

Presently, the PCED offers assistance to the school through research grants for faculty research and other research conducted within the school, support for working papers published in the Philippine Review of Economics, information dissemination through seminars, teaching fellowships, and maintenance and refurbishment of PCED and school facilities.

The PCED is administered by its executive director and overseen by its Board of Trustees:

- Chairman: Arsenio M. Balisacan, as the Secretary of Socio-Economic Planning and Director of NEDA
- Executive Director: Ma. Joy V. Abrenica
- Members:
  - Lucas Bersamin, Executive Secretary
  - Amenah F. Pangandaman, Secretary of the Department of Budget and Management
  - Alfredo E. Pascual, Secretary of the Department of Trade and Industry
  - Eli M. Remolona Jr., Governor of the Bangko Sentral ng Pilipinas
  - Ralph G. Recto, Secretary of the Department of Finance
  - Angelo A. Jimenez, President of the University of the Philippines

== Notable alumni ==
Among notable alumni of the School, or the Department of Economics preceding it, are deans of the School and officers of the university, leaders of the Philippines' largest companies, entrepreneurs, economics faculty in various Philippine universities, past and present government Secretaries and Undersecretaries, including officials of the National Economic and Development Authority (NEDA), a member of the Commission on Elections, two Governors of the Bangko Sentral ng Pilipinas, members of the Philippine Senate and House of Representatives, two Justices of the Supreme Court, a Vice-President of the Philippines, and a President of the Philippines.

- Gerardo P. Sicat (MA Econ 1958): Professor emeritus, UPSE; Minister of Economic Planning and Director-General, National Economic and Development Authority (1973–1981)
- Solita Monsod (nee Collas) (Winnie) (AB Econ 1959): Professor emeritus, UPSE; TV host and columnist; Secretary for Socioeconomic Planning and NEDA Director-General (1986–1989)
- Conchita Carpio Morales (AB Econ 1964): Ombudsman of the Philippines (2011–2018); Associate Justice, Supreme Court (2002–2011)
- Mahar Mangahas (MA Econ 1965): President, Social Weather Stations; former faculty, UPSE
- Benjamin Diokno (MA Econ 1974): Member, Monetary Board, Bangko Sentral ng Pilipinas (2024-); Secretary, Department of Finance (2022–2024); Governor, Bangko Sentral ng Pilipinas, (2019–2022); Secretary, Department of Budget and Management (2016–2019; 1998–2001); Undersecretary, Department of Budget and Management (1986–1991); professor emeritus, UPSE
- Raul V. Fabella (MA Econ 1975): National Scientist; Academician (NAST); professor emeritus, UPSE
- Emmanuel F. Esguerra (AB Econ 1976; MA Econ 1981; PhD 1993): Acting Secretary for Socio-Economic Planning and NEDA Director-General (Feb–June 2016); Deputy-Director General of the National Development Office for Policy and Planning, NEDA (2012 – Jan 2016); former faculty, UPSE
- Felipe Medalla (MA Econ 1976): Governor, Bangko Sentral ng Pilipinas, (2022– ); Member, Monetary Board, Bangko Sentral ng Pilipinas (2011–2016, 2017–2022); Secretary for Socioeconomic Planning and NEDA Director-General (1998–2001); former vice-president, UP; former faculty and dean, UPSE
- Dante Canlas (Ph.D. 1978): Professor emeritus, UPSE; Secretary for Socioeconomic Planning and NEDA Director-General (2001–2002)
- Rowena V. Guanzon (BS Econ 1979): Member, House of Representatives (2022– ); Commissioner, Commission on Elections, (2015–2022); Commissioner on Audit (2013–2015); Mayor, Cadiz City, Negros Oriental, (1988–1991)
- Nestor Espenilla Jr. (BS BE 1981) Governor, Bangko Sentral ng Pilipinas (2017–2019)
- Marvic M.V.F Leonen (BS Econ 1983): Senior Associate Justice, Supreme Court of the Philippines, (2013– )
- Pilar "Pia" Juliana Cayetano (BS Econ 1985): Senator (2004–2016; 2019– )
- Gloria Macapagal Arroyo (PhD 1985): President of the Republic of the Philippines (2001–2010); Member, House of Representatives (2010–2019; 2022– ) and Speaker (2018–2019)
- Maria Leonor (Leni) Robredo (nee Gerona) (BS Econ 1987): 14th Vice President of the Philippines (2016–2022); member, House of Representatives (2013–2016)
- Bernadette Romulo-Puyat (BS Econ 1990, MA Econ 1998): Secretary, Department of Tourism (2018–2022); Deputy Governor, Bangko Sentral ng Pilipinas (2022– )
- Stella Luz Alabastro Quimbo (BS Econ 1991, PhD 2000): Member, House of Representatives (2019– ); Commissioner, Philippine Competition Commission (2015–2019); former faculty, UPSE

== Images ==
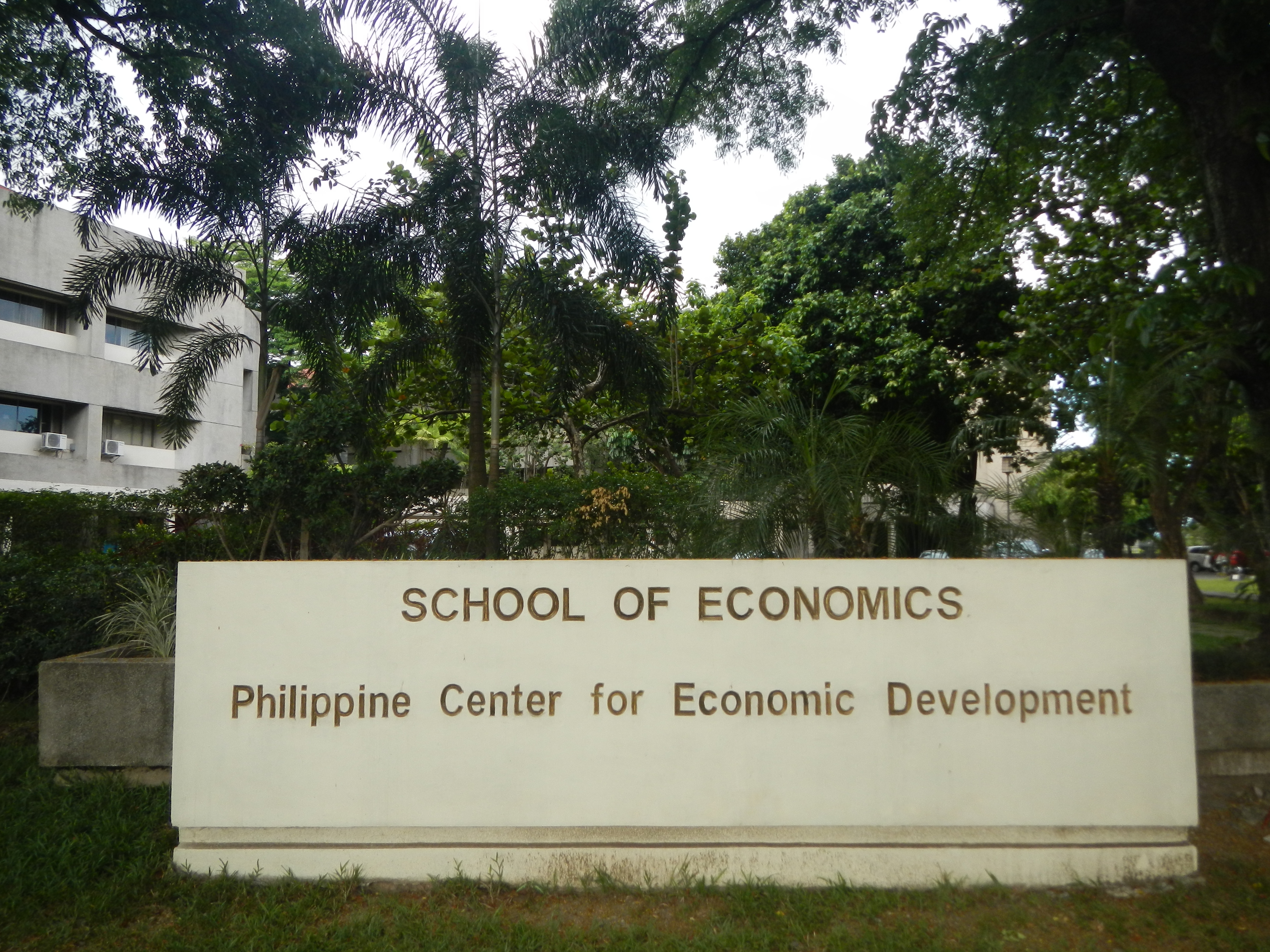
Entrance inscription

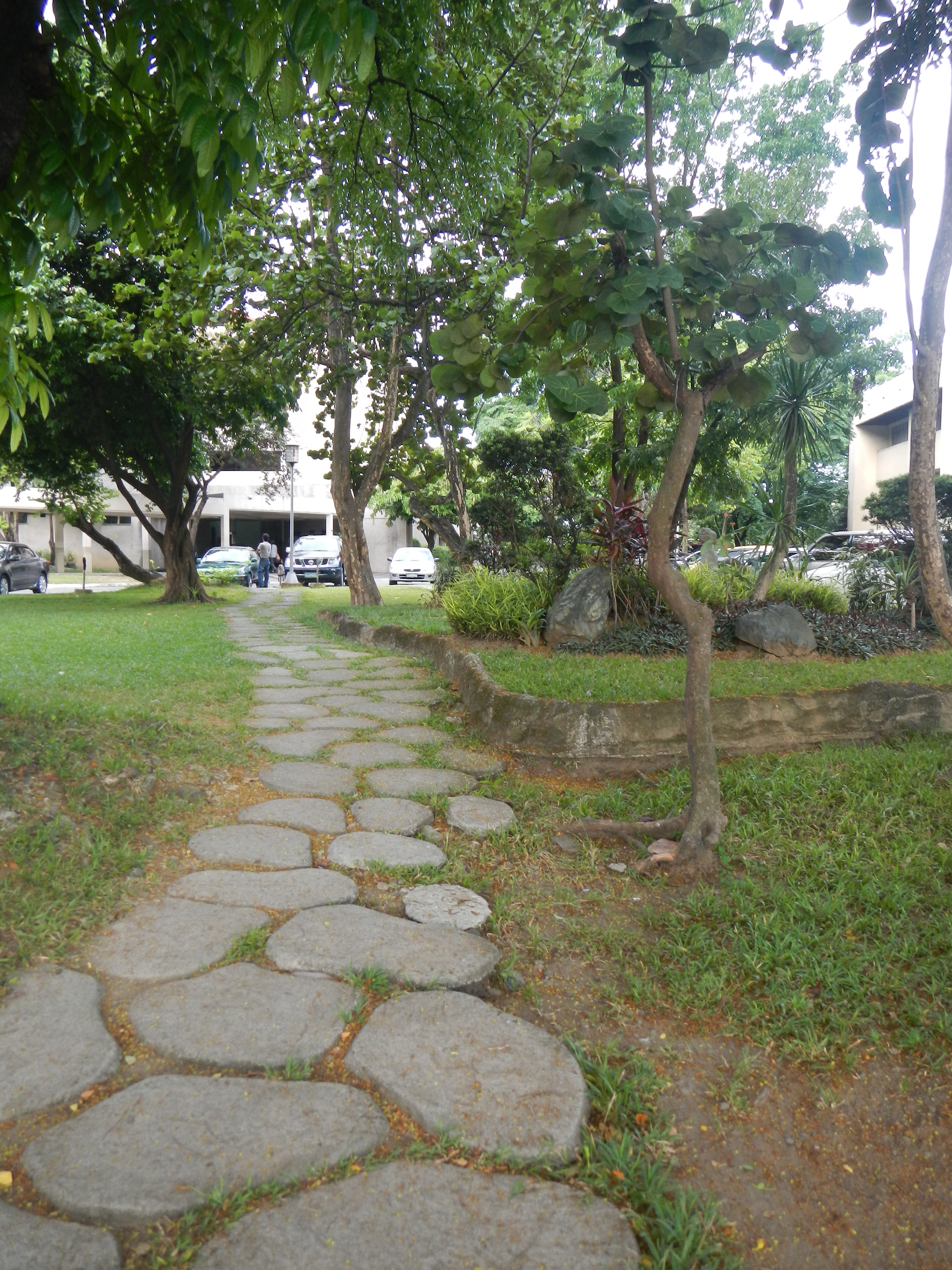
Pathway

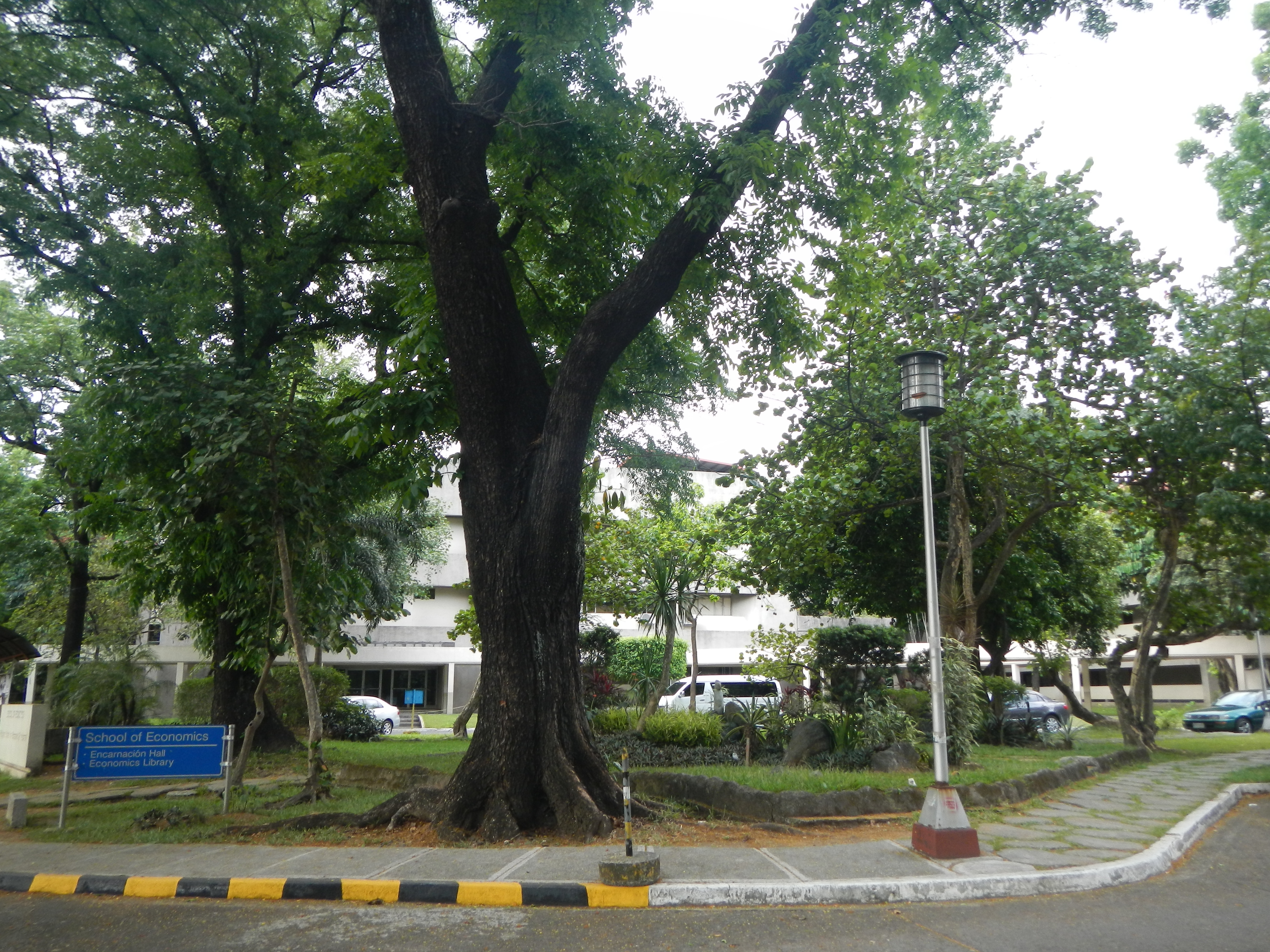
Road intersection, crossing

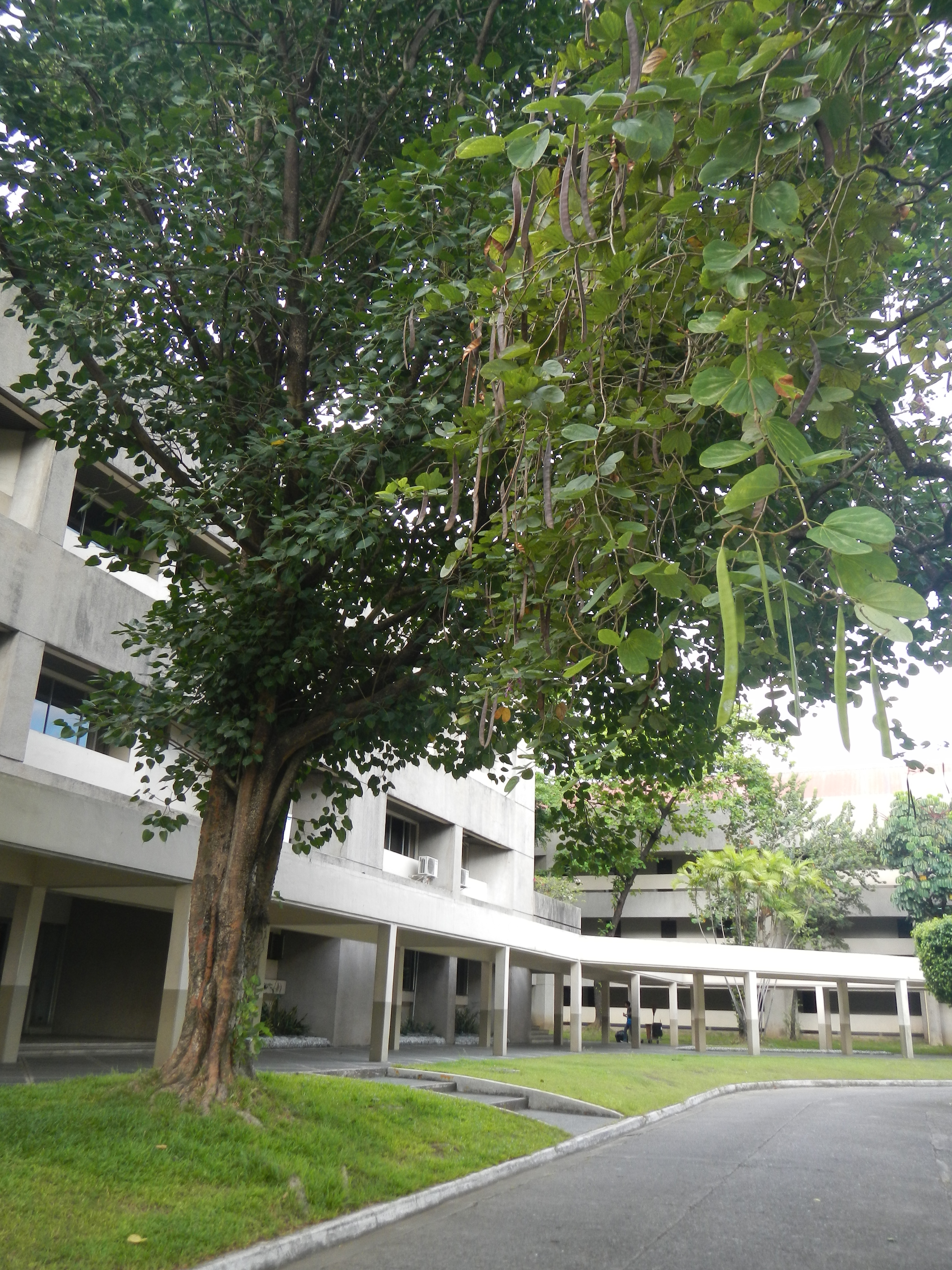
Facade

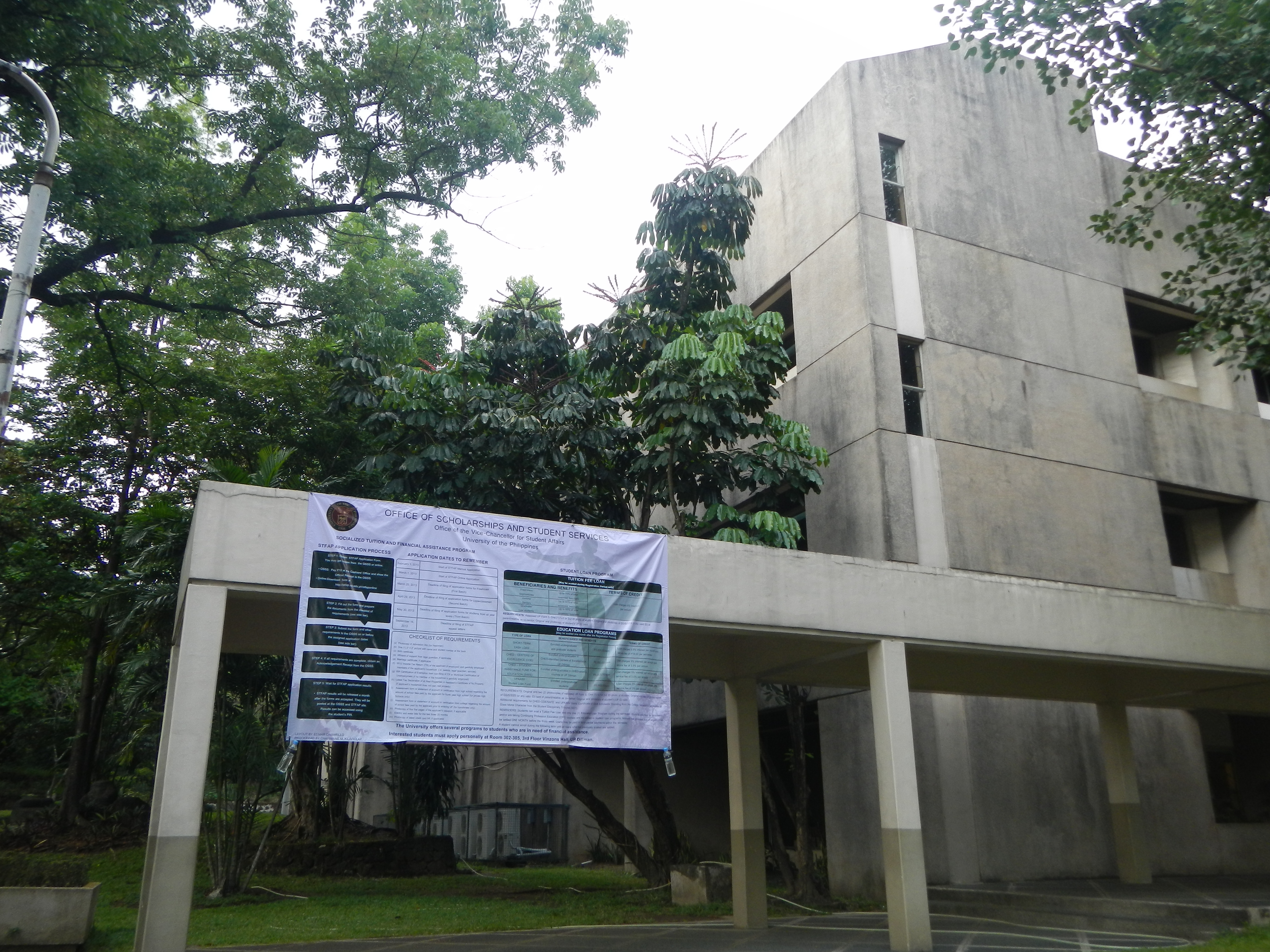
Left side

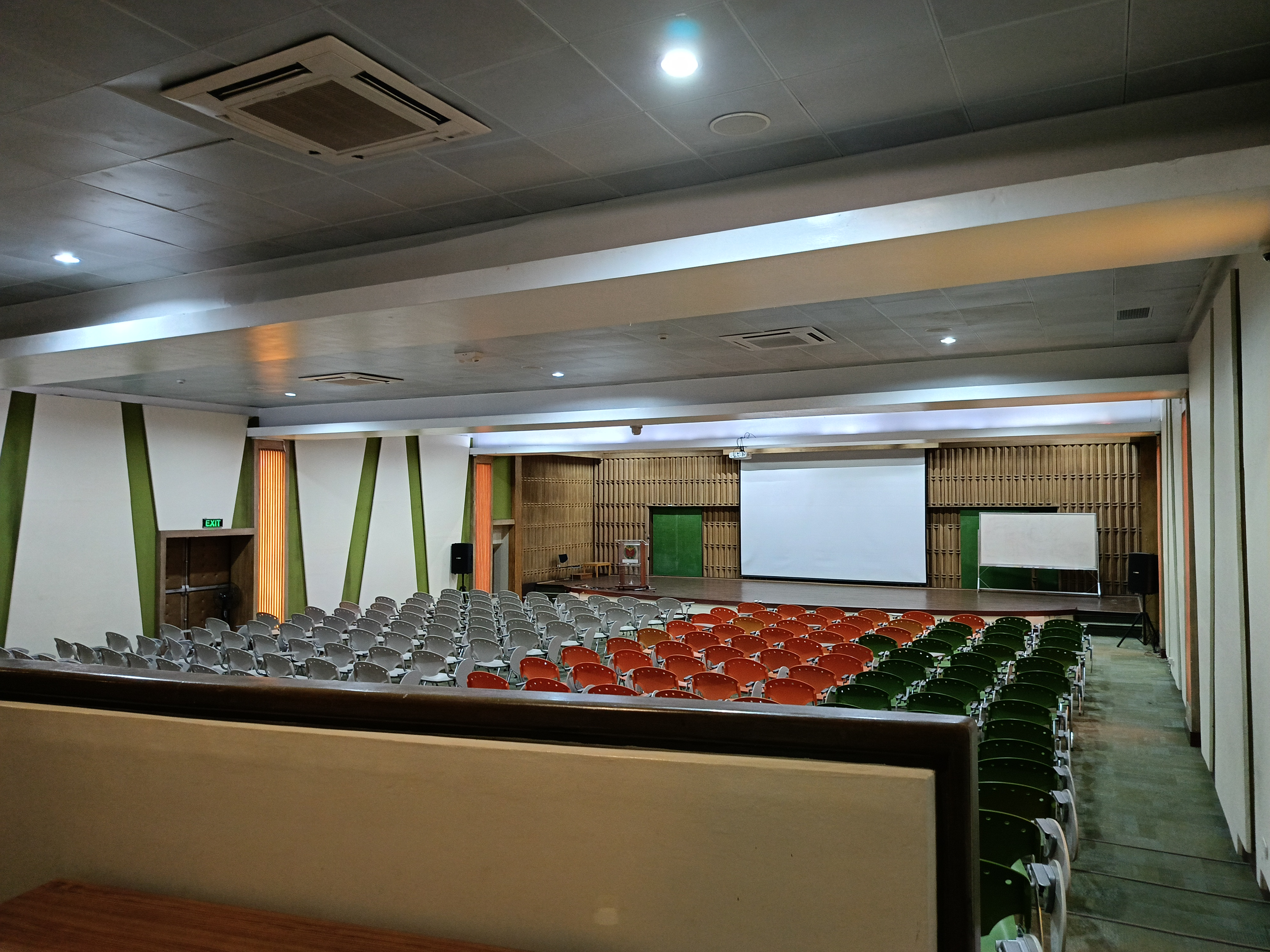
Auditorium

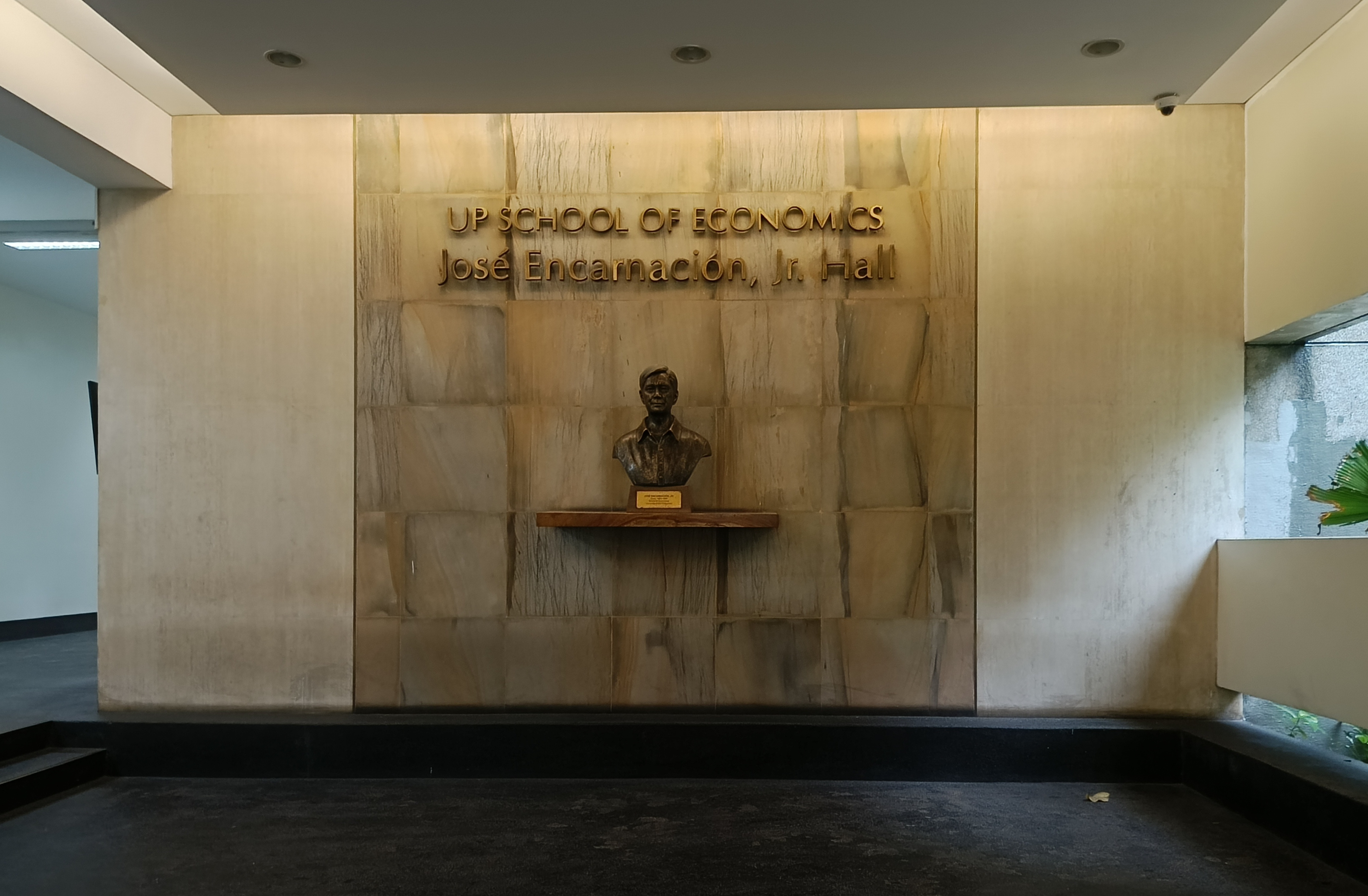
Entrance to the Jose Encarnaciòn Jr. Hall

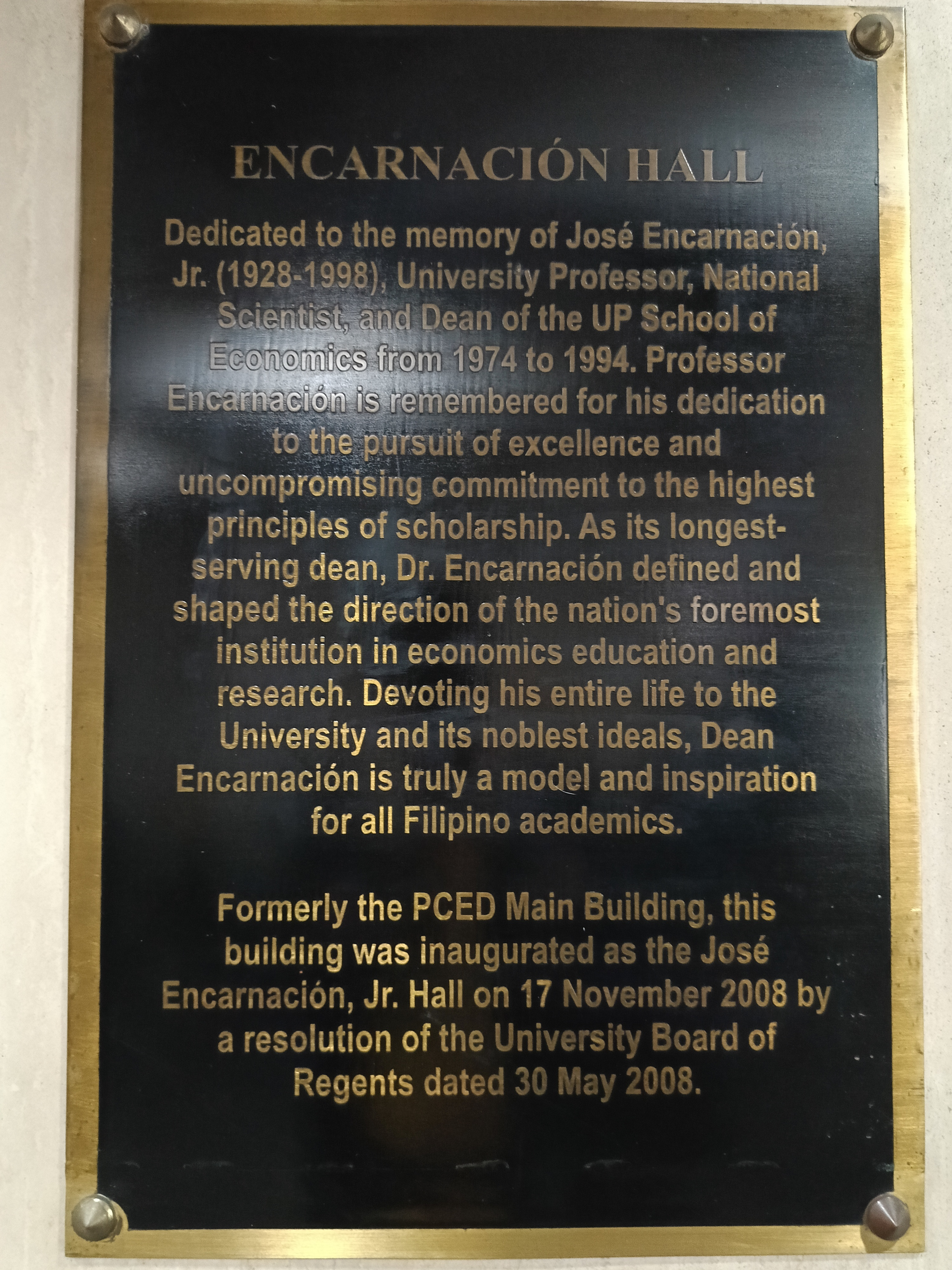
Jose Encarnaciòn Jr. Hall commemorative plaque

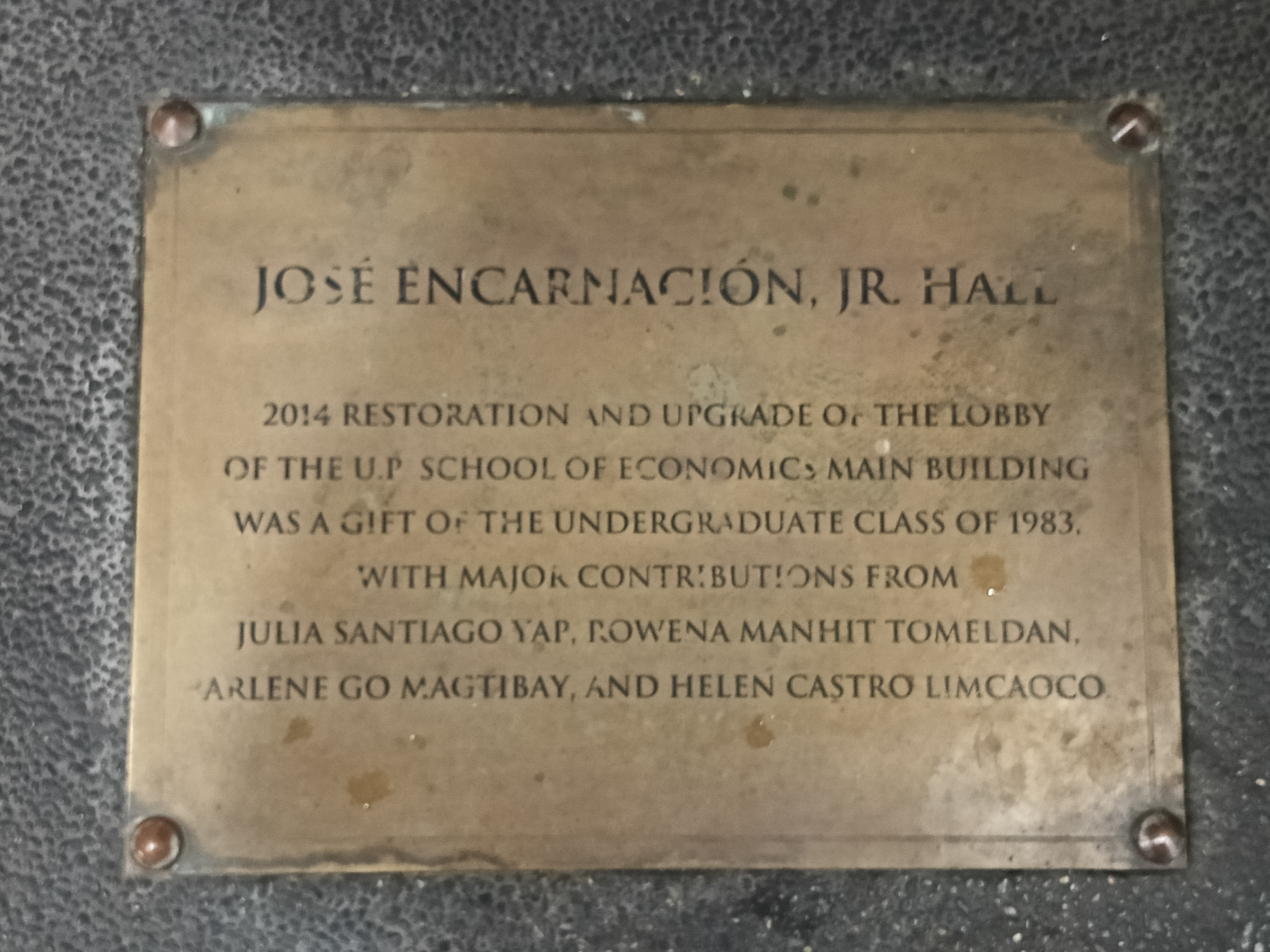
Jose Encarnaciòn Jr. Hall restoration plaque

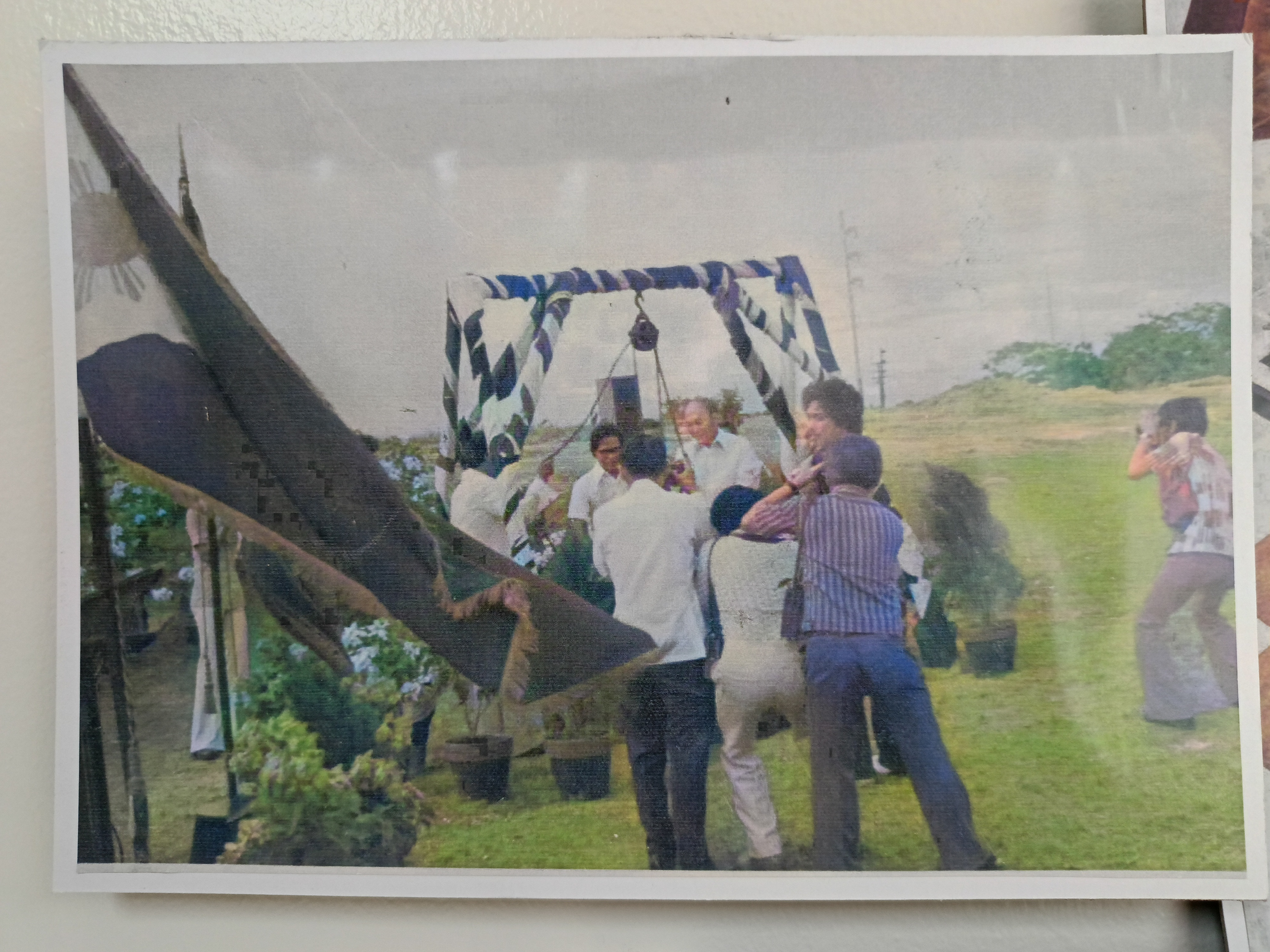
Groundbreaking of the UPSE Buildings

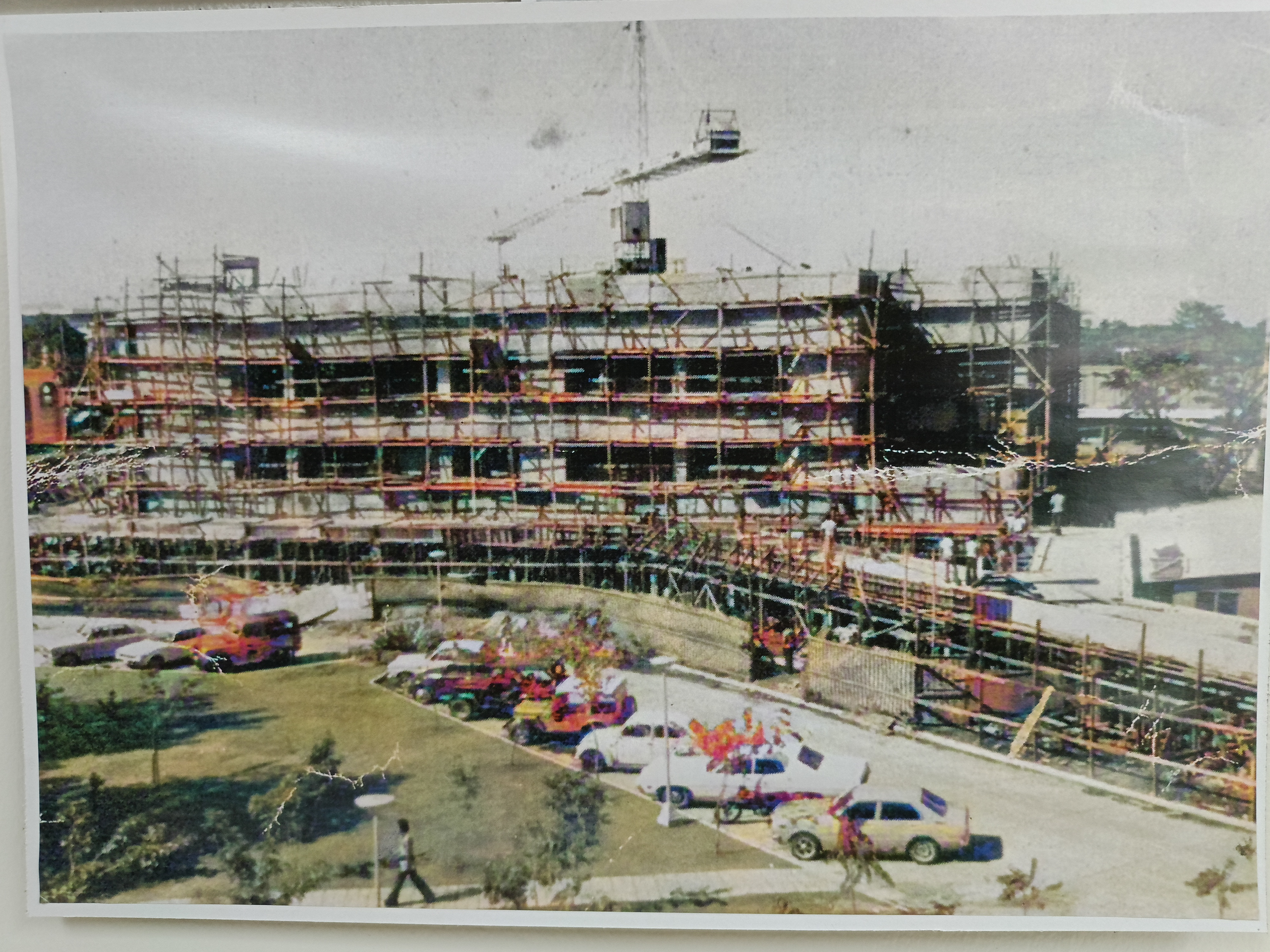
Undated Picture of the Construction of the Library Building

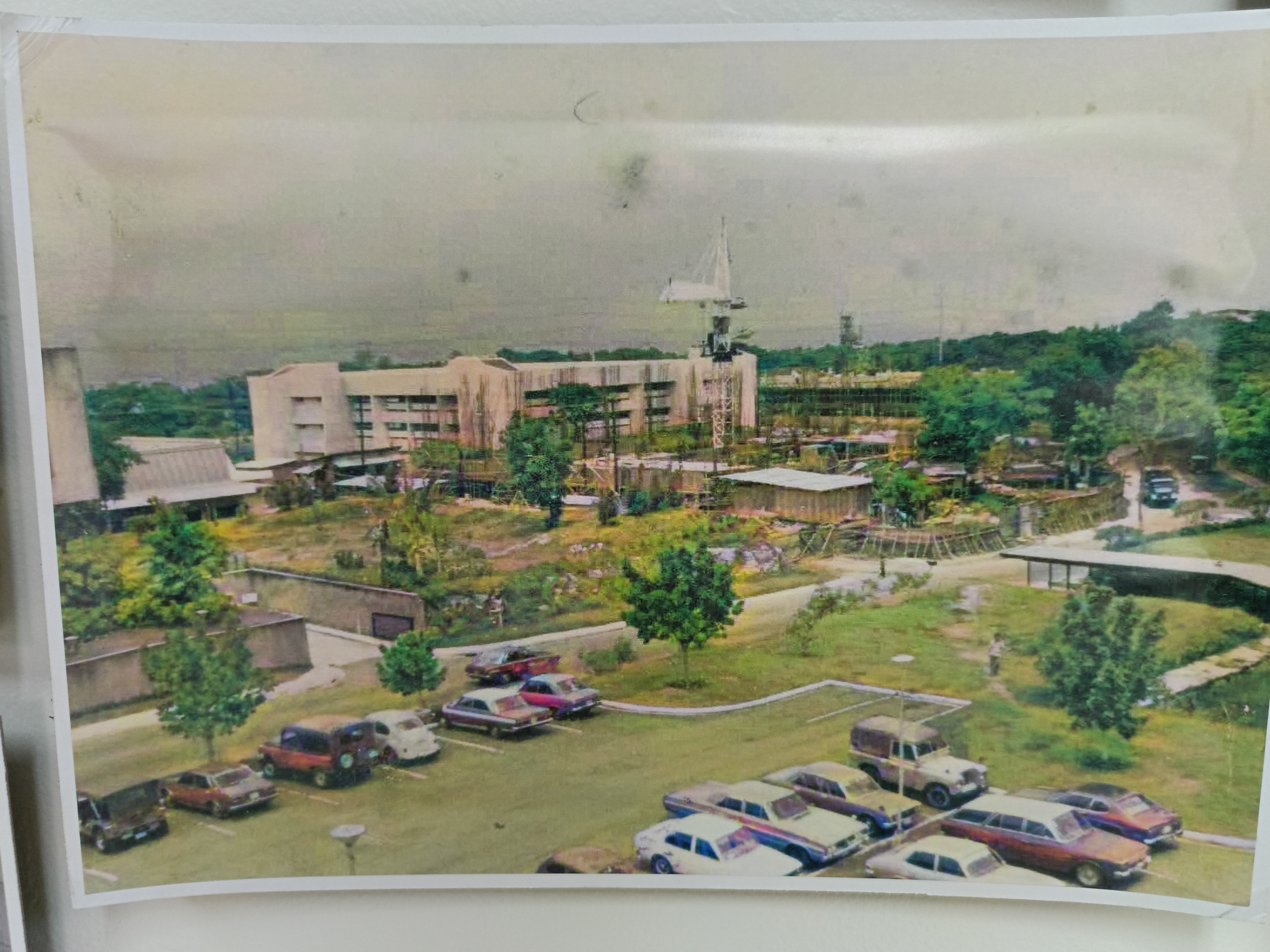
Undated Picture of the Construction of the Jose Encarnaciòn Jr. Hall

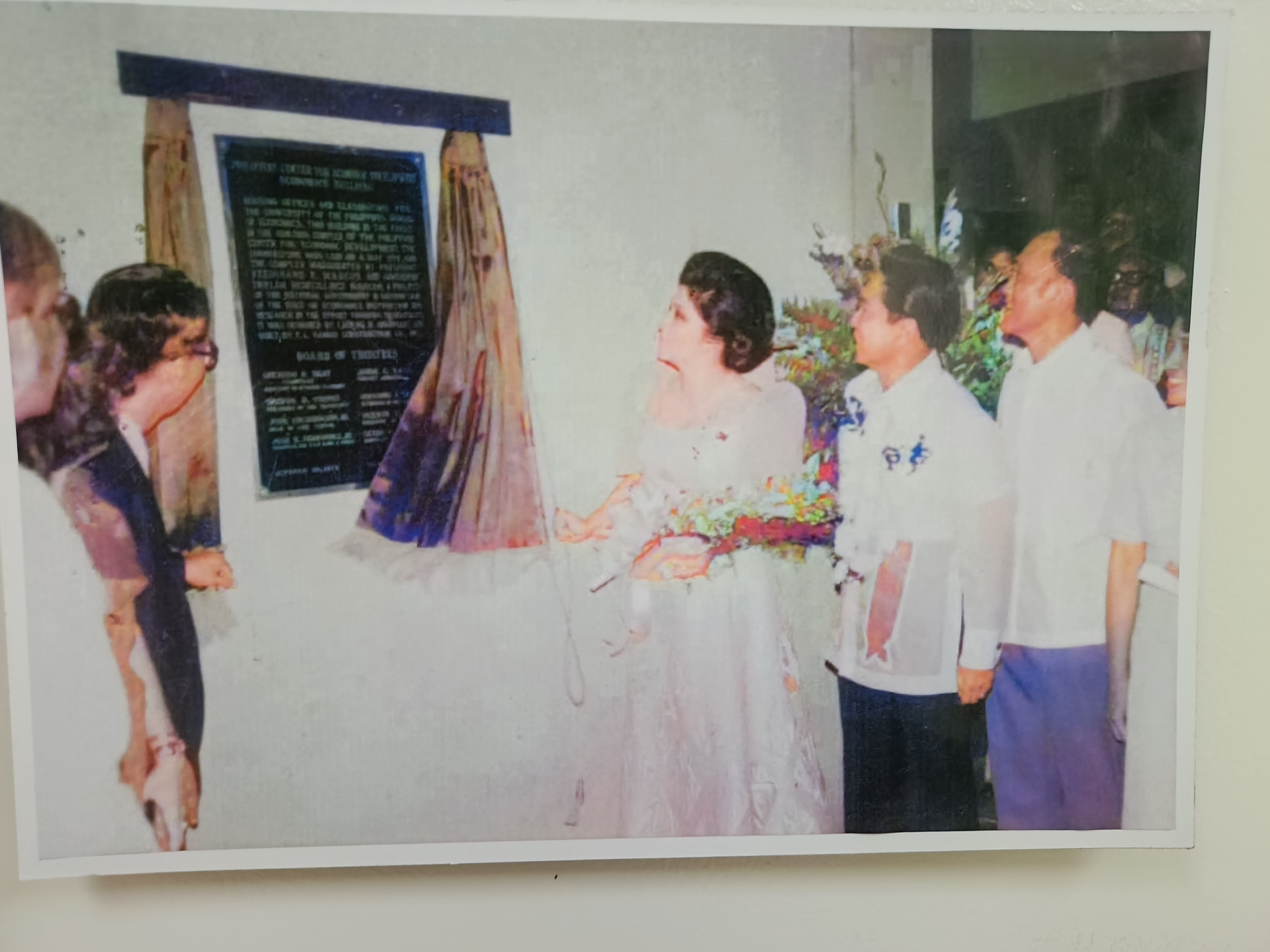
Dedication of the Philippine Center for Economic Development Building by Ferdinand and Imelda Marcos
