= Cielo Magno =

Filipino academic

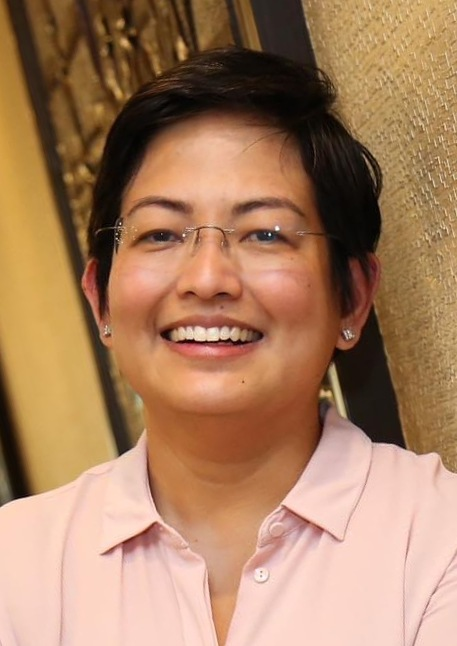
- Cielo Magno, in 2024
- Born: Maria Cielo Diaz Magno; October 30, 1977 (age 48); Gapan, Nueva Ecija, Philippines
- Occupations: Economist, Professor, Civil Servant
- Employer: University of the Philippines Diliman
- Spouse: Dante Gatmaytan
- Children: 3

Academic background
- Education: University of the Philippines Diliman (BS, MA); Northeastern University (PhD)
- Thesis: Influencing Physician Prescribing Behavior: Direct-to-Consumer Advertising and the Demand for Me-too Drugs (2013)
- Doctoral advisor: Alan Clayton-Matthews

Academic work
- Main interests: Law and Economics; Public Economics; Environmental Economics; Health Economics
- Website: YouTube Channel

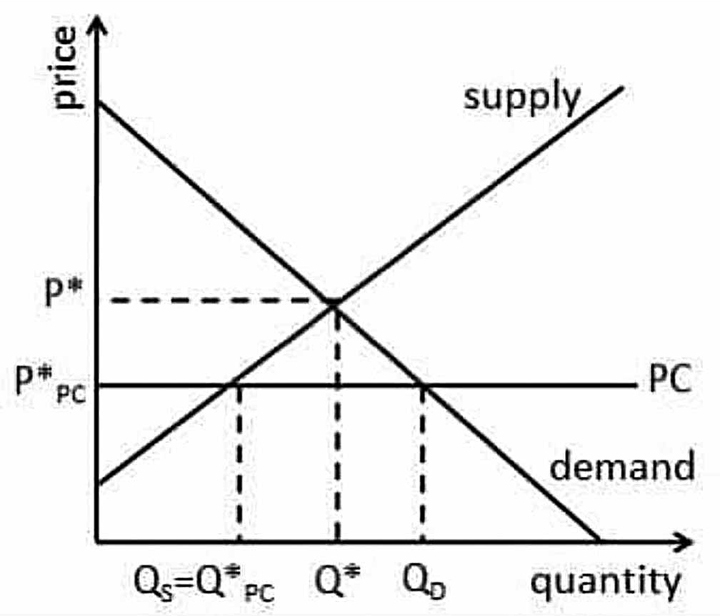
Magno's Supply and Demand Graph as posted on Facebook

Maria Cielo Diaz Gatmaytan-Magno (born October 30, 1977) is a Filipino economist and former Finance Undersecretary for Fiscal Policy and Monitoring. She chaired the Philippine Extractive Industries Transparency Initiative, the Fiscal Incentives Review Board (FIRB) Technical Committee, and the Inter-Agency Investment Promotion Coordination Committee (IIPCC) Technical Committee.

Magno resigned from her position following her public criticism of Executive Order No. 39, which imposed a price ceiling on rice. She shared a supply and demand graph on her Facebook page to illustrate how price controls could lead to supply shortages and affect farmers and consumers. Her post was met with criticism from Malacañang, with Executive Secretary Lucas Bersamin stating that she did not support the administration's programs.

Prior to her government service, Magno was a full professor at the University of the Philippines School of Economics. In 2024, she was selected to represent civil society in the Global Steering Committee of the Open Government Partnership.

== Early life and education ==
Magno was born in Gapan City, Nueva Ecija, Philippines, to Dr. Crispin Magno (optometrist) and Lorenza Diaz (businesswoman), and the family resides in San Isidro, Nueva Ecija. Raised by her grandparents, judge Julio P. Magno and pianist Dominga Magno, she started piano lessons at age four and recently picked up the saxophone.

She received her primary education at San Isidro Central School, then transferred to Gapan North Central School as valedictorian. She finished high school at Divina Pastora College, also as valedictorian. In 1994, she enrolled at University of the Philippines Diliman, earning a BS in Business Economics and an MA in economics from UP's School of Economics. Magno is a member of the Adelfe Enu Crea Sorority.

As a UP student, Magno served as chairperson of the University Student Council, the third woman in that role since 1913. She was also a member of the University of the Philippines Concert Chorus, participating in its 1996 international tour under Dean Reynaldo Paguio.

In 2005, Magno was awarded the Fulbright Scholarship for a PhD in law and public policy at Northeastern University in Boston, Massachusetts, with a dissertation examining how pharmaceutical companies influence doctors' decisions on prescribing medication.

== Career ==
Magno is a full professor in the University of the Philippines School of Economics. She has more than twenty years of experience in research and policy work with the public and the private sector including local and international agencies. Her research and interests focus on public finance; law, health, institutional, and resource economics; and industry regulation. Her publications include discussions on health, pharmaceutical competition and access to medicine, corruption, foreign investments, decentralization and local public finance, transportation policy, energy and mining, civic space and human rights, natural resources, economic and social development, mental health and spirituality, and the court system.

Early in her career she served as the executive director of the National Movement of Young Legislators (NMYL). NMYL is a local government league of young legislators. She served as the national coordinator of Bantay Kita/Publish What You Pay Philippines, the coalition of civil society organizations calling for transparency and accountability in the mining and oil and gas sector from 2012 to 2016 and helped found the Philippine EITI.

Magno served as a member of the international board of the Extractive Industries Transparency Initiative for seven years. During her tenure as a board member, the EITI Standard has evolved to include disclosures on social and environmental impacts of extractive industries, contracts, beneficial ownership and free prior and informed consent on top of the financial disclosure required by the transparency and accountability organization. She has been pushing for transparency and accountability in the mining sector and has been pushing for fiscal, social, and environmental reforms. She also sat on the board of various civil society organizations.

Magno has also been involved with anti-corruption initiatives in and outside government.

As of 2025, she serves as co-chair of the Open Government Partnership (OGP) Steering Committee alongside the Government of Spain. Her term as co-chair runs through October 2025, and she will remain a member of the Steering Committee until 2027.

In 2025, Magno received The Outstanding Women in Nation's Service (TOWNS) Award for her work on financial accountability and good governance.

=== Legal advocacy ===
In 2024, she was a petitioner in a case questioning the allocation of confidential funds to the Office of the Vice President.

She was also a petitioner in a case challenging the constitutionality of the Department of Finance's directive involving the transfer of PhilHealth funds.

In 2025, she joined a petition to declare certain provisions of the 2025 General Appropriations Act unconstitutional, particularly those related to the allocation of P26 billion in Ayuda para sa Kapos ang Kita Program (AKAP) funds.

She also filed a petition for certiorari and mandamus seeking to compel Congress to pass a law prohibiting political dynasties, as mandated by the 1987 Constitution.
