= Arts of Asia =

Magazine of art

- Cover of November–December 2017 issue
- Editor: Robin Markbreiter
- Categories: Art magazine
- Frequency: Quarterly
- Founder: Tuyet Nguyet, Stephen Markbreiter
- First issue: January–February 1971
- Company: Arts of Asia Publications Limited
- Based in: Hong Kong
- Language: English
- Website: artsofasia.com
- ISSN: 0004-4083

Arts of Asia, founded in 1970, is an international magazine of Asian arts and antiques, and has the largest circulation of any Asian art magazine. It is published four times a year, and is distributed to 90 countries. It offers reading about Asian art and culture, and provides collectors and scholars of the field with a research resource, as well as information about industry trends.

== History ==
Arts of Asia was founded in 1970 by Tuyet Nguyet, who was also the magazine's first publisher and editor. Nguyet first conceived the idea for the magazine in 1969, combining her interests in Asian art and antiques with her journalistic background to promote an understanding and appreciation for Asian art and culture. In 1970, a preview edition appeared, followed by the magazine's first issue in January–February 1971, featuring Ming dynasty (1368–1644) Shekwan (Shiwan) ware on the cover. The issue included in-depth articles and auction news.

Nguyet built the publication with the help of her husband and Arts of Asia’s associate editor, Stephen Markbreiter, an established architect who designed many of Hong Kong's important buildings such as the Mandarin Oriental. Nguyet was a key player in the establishment of Hong Kong offices for the major auction houses, Sotheby's and Christie's. In 1973, Nguyet encouraged Sotheby's to set up a Hong Kong office, which it did, holding its inaugural regional auction that same year, the first international auction house to do so in Asia. In 1980, she went to New York to advise James Lally of Sotheby's to bring modern Chinese paintings to Hong Kong. The auction house's first sale of modern Chinese paintings took place on May 28th of that year at City Hall. In 1984, at the urging of collectors and dealers, Nguyet went to London to convince Christie's also to establish a presence in Hong Kong. The house held its first auction in the city in January 1986.

Between 1971 and 1974, Nguyet and Stephen Markbreiter wrote numerous articles on Chinese culture and the arts following their first visit to China in 1965, including on Beijing's Palace Museum ("The Temple of Heaven in Peking," May–June 1972), at a time when few people travelled to China. By the mid-1970s, Arts of Asia had established a global presence with a growing subscriber base, most notably in the United States, Australia, Europe and Japan.

In 1986, the magazine's November–December issue featured "Chinese paintings in the Imperial Age" from the National Palace Museum as its cover story, written by Wang Yao-t'ing, Lee Yu-min, Tu Shu-hua, and Ho Ch'uan-hsing, the first time that scholarly articles, written by Chinese specialists, were translated into English and presented to an international readership.

In 1995, Arts of Asia established its website, offering a searchable database of articles.

In 2017, Nguyet's son, Robin Markbreiter, who was the magazine's executive editor, became publisher and editor.

Cover of January–February 2020 issue

Arts of Asia celebrated its 50th anniversary in 2020, publishing a milestone "50th Anniversary Edition" in January–February, which featured 50 outstanding Asian artworks from prestigious museums, institutions and private collections, selected by museum directors, curators, and specialists of the field.

== Notable Contributors ==
Leading experts of Asian art including learned artists, museum curators, collectors, and academics, have contributed to Arts of Asia over the years, including among others, the following:

- Christian Boehm
- Paul Bromberg
- Sheila R. Canby
- John T. Carpenter
- William Chak
- Nicolas Chow
- Degawa Tetsurō
- Giuseppe Eskenazi
- Menno Fitski
- Sylvia Fraser-Lu
- Hollis Goodall
- Guo Fuxiang
- John Guy
- Julian Harding
- Jessica Harrison-Hall
- Maxwell K. (Mike) Hearn
- Anna Jackson
- Rose Kerr
- Roger Keverne
- Simon Kwan
- James J. Lally
- Peter Lam
- Eric Lefebvre
- Denise Patry Leidy
- James C.S. Lin
- Kai-yin Lo
- Victor Lo
- Richard Marchant
- Maria Kar-wing Mok
- Kerry Nguyen-Long
- Estelle Niklès van Osselt
- Pratapaditya Pal
- Rod. Paras-Perez
- Stacey Pierson
- Santiago Albano Pilar
- Jane Portal
- Amy G. Poster
- Adriana Proser
- Howard and Mary Ann Rogers
- Ditas R. Samson
- Rosemary Scott
- Colin Sheaf
- Jan Stuart
- Paula Swart
- Paul Michael Taylor
- Susan Tosk
- Ramon Villegas
- John E. Vollmer
- Clarissa von Spee
- Richard Wesley
- Ming Wilson
- Jay Xu
- Josh Yiu

== Notable Features ==
Each cover of the magazine highlights an artwork or painting from an exhibition or collection of a distinguished museum, institution, or collector. These have included, among others, works from the following organizations:

- Asian Civilisations Museum
- Ayala Museum
- British Museum
- Brooklyn Museum
- Cleveland Museum of Art
- Fitzwilliam Museum
- Hong Kong Museum of Art
- Hong Kong Palace Museum
- Linden Museum
- Metropolitan Museum of Art
- Museum of Cultural History, Oslo
- Museum of Oriental Ceramics, Osaka
- National Palace Museum
- Palace Museum Beijing
- Peabody Essex Museum
- Rietberg Museum
- Royal Museums of Art and History
- Royal Ontario Museum
- Shanghai Museum
- Topkapı Palace
- Victoria and Albert Museum

== See also ==
- Orientations
