= Santiago Albano Pilar =

Filipino historian (1946–2021)

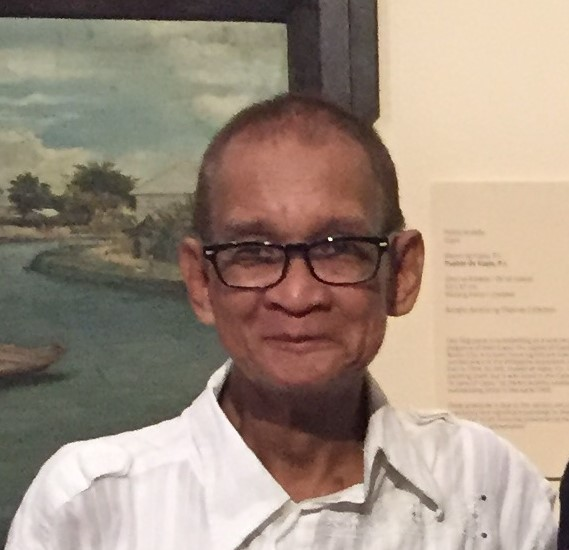
- Pilar in 2017
- Born: Santiago Albano Pilar; 15 October 1946; Bacarra, Ilocos Norte, Philippines
- Died: 12 April 2021 (aged 74); Manila, Philippines
- Education: University of the Philippines (BA)
- Occupations: Art Historian; Curator; Writer

Santiago Albano Pilar (15 October 1946 – 12 April 2021) more popularly known as Jak Pilar, was a Filipino art historian, curator, and author. He was best known for chronicling Philippine art centered on the 19th and the 20th century in numerous publications in both the Philippines and overseas.

== Early life and career ==
Pilar was born in the municipality of Bacarra, Ilocos Norte on 15 October 1946 to Elias Pilar, who served as the municipal judge of Bacarra from 1955 until 1975, and Jesusa Albano. He finished his primary and secondary education at the Vigan Minor Seminary and later transferred to the Convento de San Agustin. Pilar later graduated with a bachelor's degree in art history, at the University of the Philippines Diliman.

== Art historian ==
After graduating in 1976, Pilar taught courses in art history and connoisseurship in both the undergraduate and graduate programs at the University of the Philippines College of Fine Arts from 1977, until his retirement in 2011. He served as a consultant and independent curator for various cultural institutions including the Ayala Museum, the Cultural Center of the Philippines, the Metropolitan Museum of Manila, and the Jorge B. Vargas Museum and Filipiniana Research Center.

Pilar specialized in forgotten 19th and 20th-century Philippine artists including José Honorato Lozano, Justiniano Asunción, Vicente Villaseñor, Juan Arceo, Domingo Celis and Isabelo Tampinco that were published in the cultural magazine Archipelago based on newly unearthed new data and led to the revaluation of the achievements of these painters. His essays on Philippine art were published in various local and international cultural publications including Arts of Asia, Orientations and Zone-D.

In 1980, Pilar published Juan Luna: The Filipino as Painter, his monograph on the life and art of Philippine artist-patriot Juan Luna considered as the main reference on the life of the artist. He subsequently served as a consultant for the First National Juan Luna and Félix Resurrección Hidalgo Commemorative Exhibition at the Metropolitan Museum of Manila, the largest exhibition of works by Luna and his contemporary, Félix Resurrección Hidalgo held in the Philippines and wrote for the exhibition catalog in 1988.

Another major contribution to Philippine art has been his research on the rediscovery of the 19th century Philippine sculptor Isabelo Tampinco that began in an exhibition on Tampinco's works and that of his sons, Angel Tampinco and Vidal A. Tampinco in 1995 at the Jorge B. Vargas Museum and Filipiniana Research Center. In 2014, Pilar published a detailed monograph on Tampinco and his works, The Life and Art of Isabelo Tampinco that was concurrent with the loaning of several sculptures of Tampinco and his atelier from the private collection of Ernesto and Araceli Salas to the National Museum of the Philippines. In 2017, Pilar published a revised version of the monograph called Isabelo Tampinco with updated information on the artist.

== Death ==
Pilar died on 12 April 2021 in Manila, the Philippines at the age of 74 due to pneumonia.

== Bibliography ==
Books and Publications

- Juan Luna: The Filipino as Painter (1980)
- Unang Pambansang Eksibisyon sa Paggunita kina Juan Luna at Felix Resurreccion Hidalgo/First National Juan Luna and Felix Resurreccion Hidalgo Commemorative Exhibition (1988)
- Inspired Calm: The Sober Realism of Domingo A. Celis (1992)
- Pamana: The Jorge B. Vargas Art Collection (1992)
- Limbag Kamay: 400 Years of Philippine Printmaking (1993) (co-authored with Imelda Cajipe-Endaya)
- Tampinco e Hijos: An Exhibition of Sculptural Pieces by Isabelo Tampinco (1995)
- Discovering Philippine Art in Spain (1998) (co-authored with Jose Maria A. Cariño and Felice Prudente Sta. Maria)
- Pioneers of Philippine Art: Luna, Amorsolo, Zobel (2004) (co-authored with Rod. Paras-Perez and Emmanuel Torres)
- Harvest of Saints (2005)
- Fabián de la Rosa and His Times (2007) (co-authored with Luciano P.R. Santiago, Macario Ofilada Mina and edited by Ana Maria Theresa P. Labrador)
- The Life and Art of Isabelo Tampinco (2014)
- Isabelo Tampinco (2017)

Contributor in Books and Other Publications

- Philippine Art and Literature (1982, The Filipino Nation) (edited by Felipe M. de Leon, Jr.)
- Readings in Philippine Cinema (1983) (edited by Rafael Ma. Guerrero)
- Philippine Painting: The Early Chinese Heritage (1994, Arts of Asia)
- Visual Arts (1994, CCP Encyclopedia of Philippine Art) (edited by Nicanor G. Tiongson)
- Dragon in the East: The Story of the Yuchengco Group of Companies (2001) (co-edited by Cesar E.A. Virata and Ino Manalo)
- Ilocos Norte: A Travel Guide Book (2004) (co-authored with Regalado Trota José, Digna Apilado, Eric B. Zerrudo, Michael Manalo, Jose Claudio B. Guerrero and Mayo Uno Aurelio Martin, Fr. Apolonio Ranche, Aimee Marcos and edited by Louise Araneta–Marcos)
