= Dolce Vita (TV programme) =

- Genre: Information
- Presented by: Desmond So; Kelly Cheung; Rabeea Yeung; Jason Chan; Becky Lee; Marcus Kwok; Sarah Song; Linna Huynh; Veronica Shiu
- Country of origin: Hong Kong
- Original languages: English; Cantonese
- No. of seasons: 17

Production
- Producer: TVB
- Production location: Hong Kong
- Editor: Various
- Running time: 25 minutes

Original release
- Network: TVB Pearl
- Release: 2 March 2006 – 29 December 2023

Dolce Vita (Chinese: 至尚生活, formerly 港生活‧港享受) is a lifestyle information television programme airing on Television Broadcasts Limited in Hong Kong. The lifestyle programme features fine dining, fashion, watches, cars, art, architecture, gadgets, and other things related to luxury lifestyle. The show also interviews local and visiting artists, celebrities, chefs, and designers. Most of the show's episodes are shot in Hong Kong but the show has previously traveled to other locations in the world, including Switzerland, Maldives, and Mainland China.

The show is currently hosted by Desmond So (aka Dez), Veronica Shiu, Linna Huynh, Joyce Ngai, Fei Wu, and Ivy Liu. Previous hosts include Kelly Cheung, Eliza Sam, Jennifer Shum, Rabeea Yeung, Lorea Solabarrieta, Aimee Chan, Kevin Lam Vaneese Toses, Jason Chan, Winnie Young, Francis Chan, Vincent Wan (Vinny), Becky Lee, Mizuni Hung, Rani Samtani, Nelson Siu, Hilda Chan, Sarah Song, Marcus Kwok, Freeyon Chung, Ting-fung Wong, and Candice Chiu.

The show currently airs in English 9:00pm every Thursday and reruns at various times during the week on TVB Pearl. The show also airs in Cantonese on TVB J2 and News and Finance Channel.

== Interviewees ==
Name	Occupation
Burney, Tom	Hong Kong Private Chef
Mouglalis, Anna	Actress
blendbrothers	Chef, DJ & Bartender
Koune, Jan	Director
Connick, Harry	Jazz artist
Siu, Gordon	Musician
Zidane, Zinedine	Football player
Cordeiro, Reinaldo	Disc jockey
Wong, Susan	Singer
Tan, Hanjin	Musician
Emmy the Great	Singer
Potts, Paul	Singer
Green, Daniel	Chef
Kapono, Jason	Basketball player
Jean, Wyclef	Musician
Beck, Barry	Ice hockey player
Chu, Joseph	Watch collector
Choi Ming Fat	Businessman
Cheung, Maggie	Actress
Lo Kai-yin	Designer
Goodrem, Delta	Singer
Heynann, Klaus	Businessman
Nishizaki, Takako	Violist
Keys, Alicia	Singer
Clooney, George	Actor
Henry, Deborah Priya	Beauty contest winner
Mikli, Alain	Designer
Tam, Vivienne	Designer
Zeman, Allan	Entrepreneur
Kam Kwok-leung	Producer
Mika (singer)	
Hui, Raman	
Chang, Gary	
Picasso, Paloma	
Lang Lang	
Garrett, David	
Newton-John Olivia	
Paige, Elaine	
Patrizzi, Osvaldo	
Ooi, Joanne	
Lo, Poman	
Liu Yang	
Legend, John	
Il Divo	
Ko, Kenneth	
Glebova, Natalie	
Row, Savile	
Olivia Lee	Sommelier
