= Marie Curie High School =

Coordinates: 10.7824°N 106.6908°E

Location
- 159 Nam Kỳ Khởi Nghĩa, District 3, Ho Chi Minh City; Vietnam

Information
- Type: High school
- Headmaster: Nguyễn Trần Khánh Bảo

Marie Curie High School (French: Lycée Marie Curie, Vietnamese: Trường Trung học Phổ thông Marie Curie) is a public high school in District 3, Ho Chi Minh City, Vietnam. Established in 1918 and named after the Nobel prize-winning scientist Marie Curie by the French colonial government, it remains the sole high school in Saigon that still bears its original name.

Founded in 1918 as a private all-girls school, it began accepting boys in 1970. All courses were taught in French until the French instructors were sent home to France after the Vietnam War ended in 1975, at which time the school became bilingual (Vietnamese and French). In 1997, the school was turned into a semi-public high school, and in 2007, it became a public high school. In the 1990s, it was one of the largest high schools in Vietnam, with around 5,000 students in regular attendance; however, enrollment has dropped to about 3,500 students (2025) since the school shifted its focus to providing a higher quality education. Over the past two decades, the school has participated in and been the subject of multiple research studies and projects.

== History ==
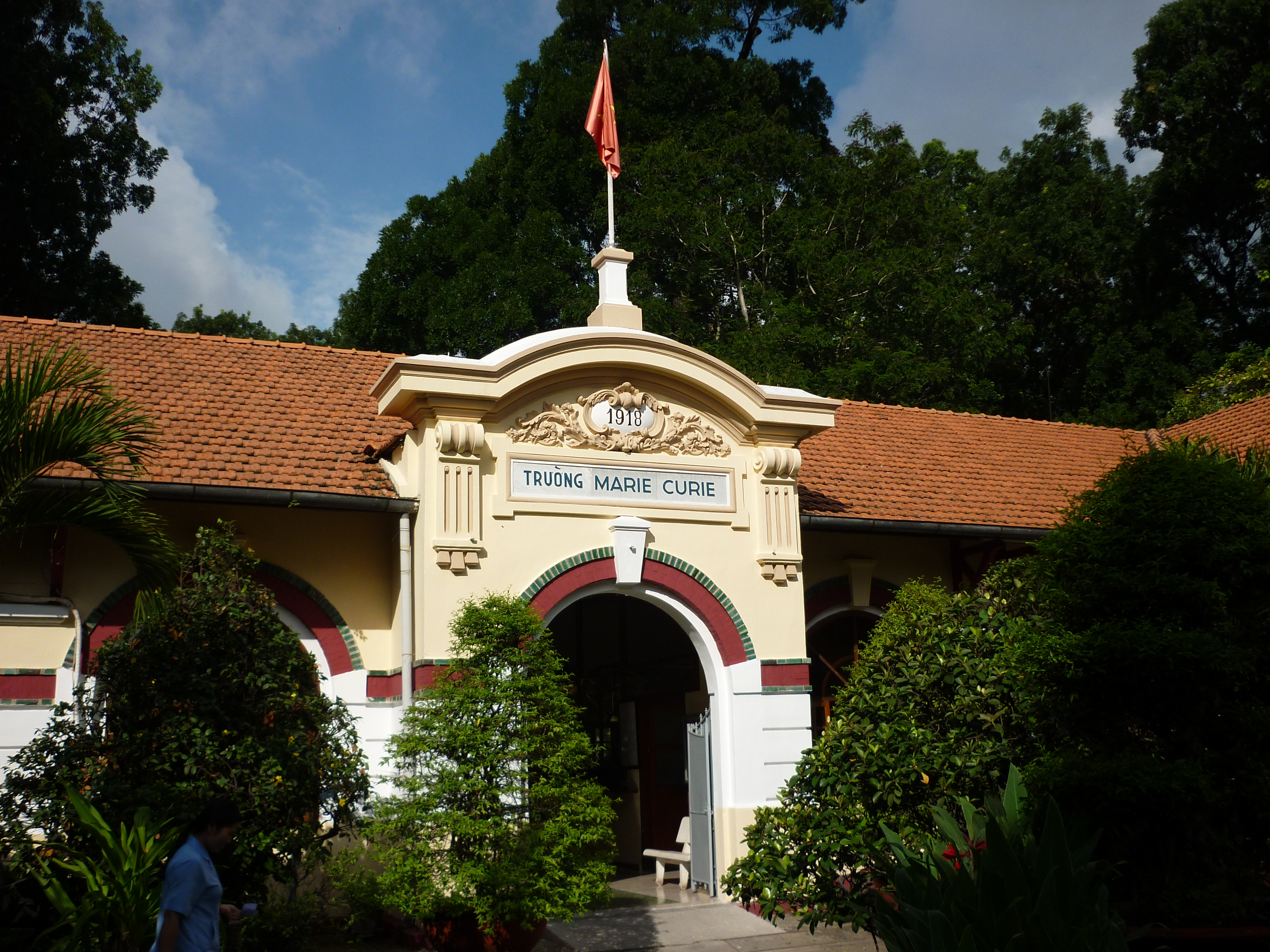
The entrance

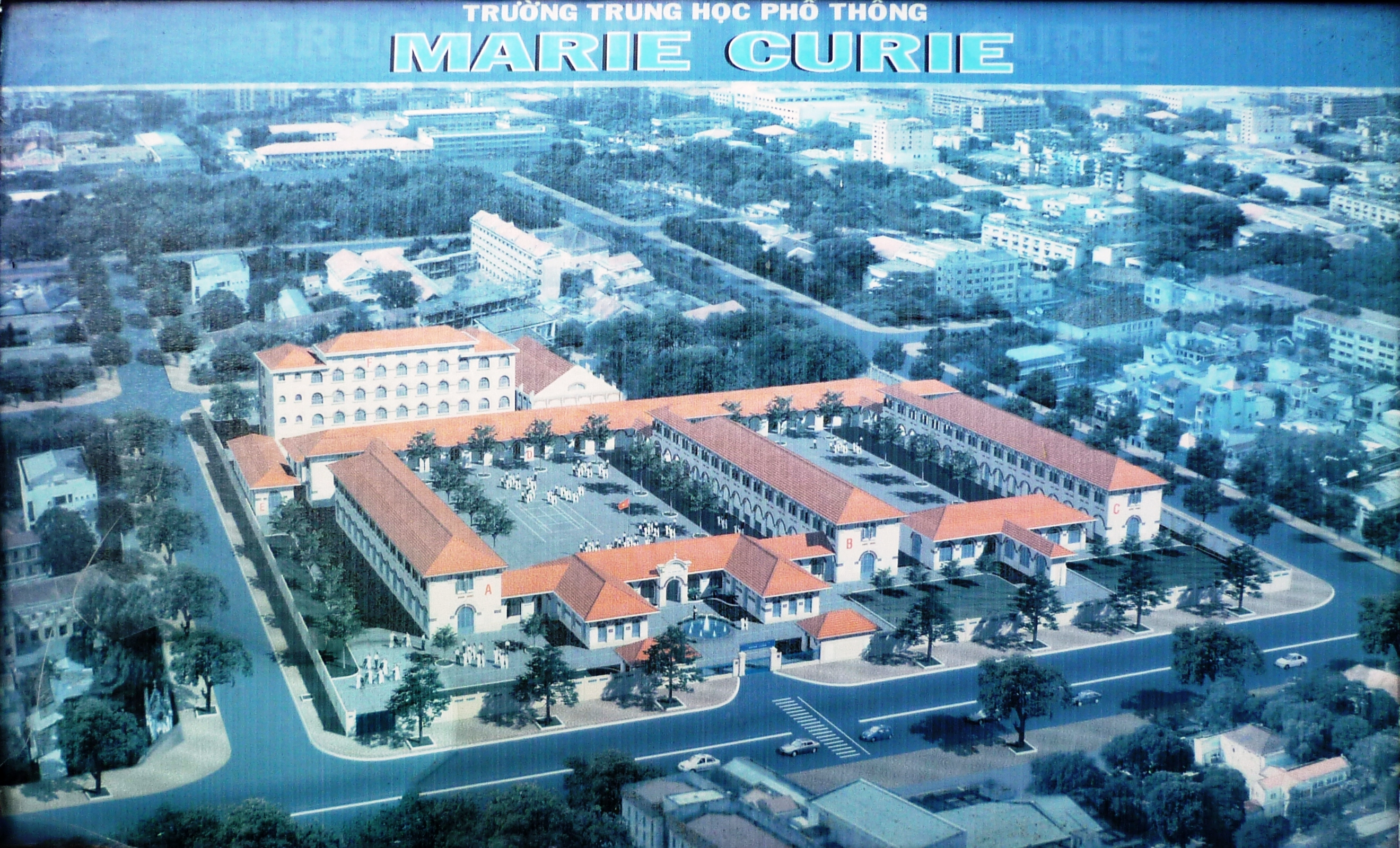
Design of Marie Curie high school

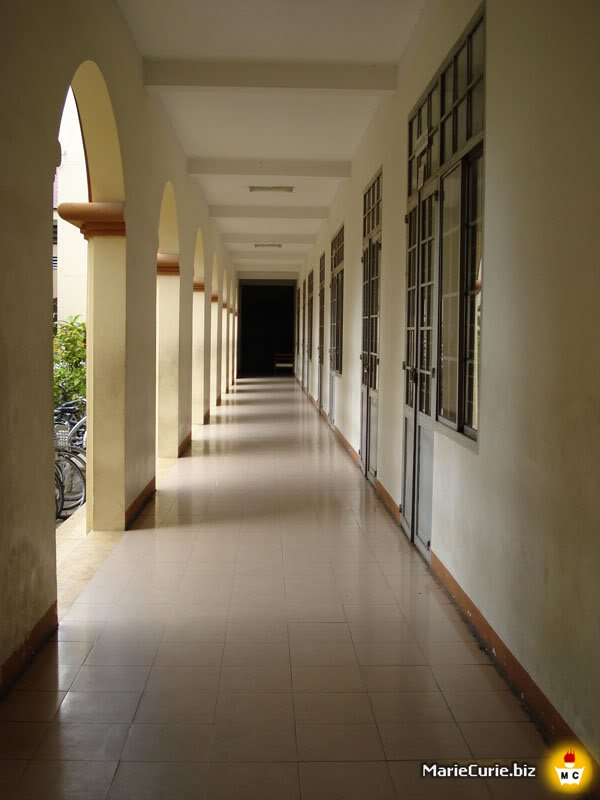
F building block, the newest block of the school.

By 1884, Vietnam was colonized by the French, and in 1887 it became part of French Indochina. Lycée Marie Curie is an example of the Western education school system that developed throughout the country under colonial rule. Located in the city of Saigon (known as Ho Chi Minh City since 1975), the school itself was very popular among French natives as the majority of the French settlers settled in Saigon.

After the Japanese entered Indochina in 1941, the school was requisitioned as a hospital, so all activities were moved to a kindergarten on Pham Ngoc Thach Street. A year later, the school was returned to its original location under the new name of Calmette Middle School. After the French returned to occupy Saigon on September 23, 1945, the school was renamed Lucien Mossard High School. In early 1948, it was renamed as Marie Curie High School (or Lycée Marie Curie). During the Republic of Vietnam era, the school was a private high school for girls. In 1970, the school started accepting male students.

The school was originally established in 1918 as an all-girls private school by the French colonial government and taught mostly French settlers and some Vietnamese locals. The majority of the Vietnamese students who attended the school were from wealthy families or were the children of government employees. Instruction for all courses at the institution was in French, and the majority of the courses taught were popular subjects in Europe that were underdeveloped fields of study in Vietnam. Despite the Vietnam War (known as the American War in Vietnam) going on during the early to mid-1900s, PhD candidate Nguyen Thuy Phong found that the school was considered to be a safe place for students which allowed for free speech, upon interviewing Vietnamese alumni of the school.

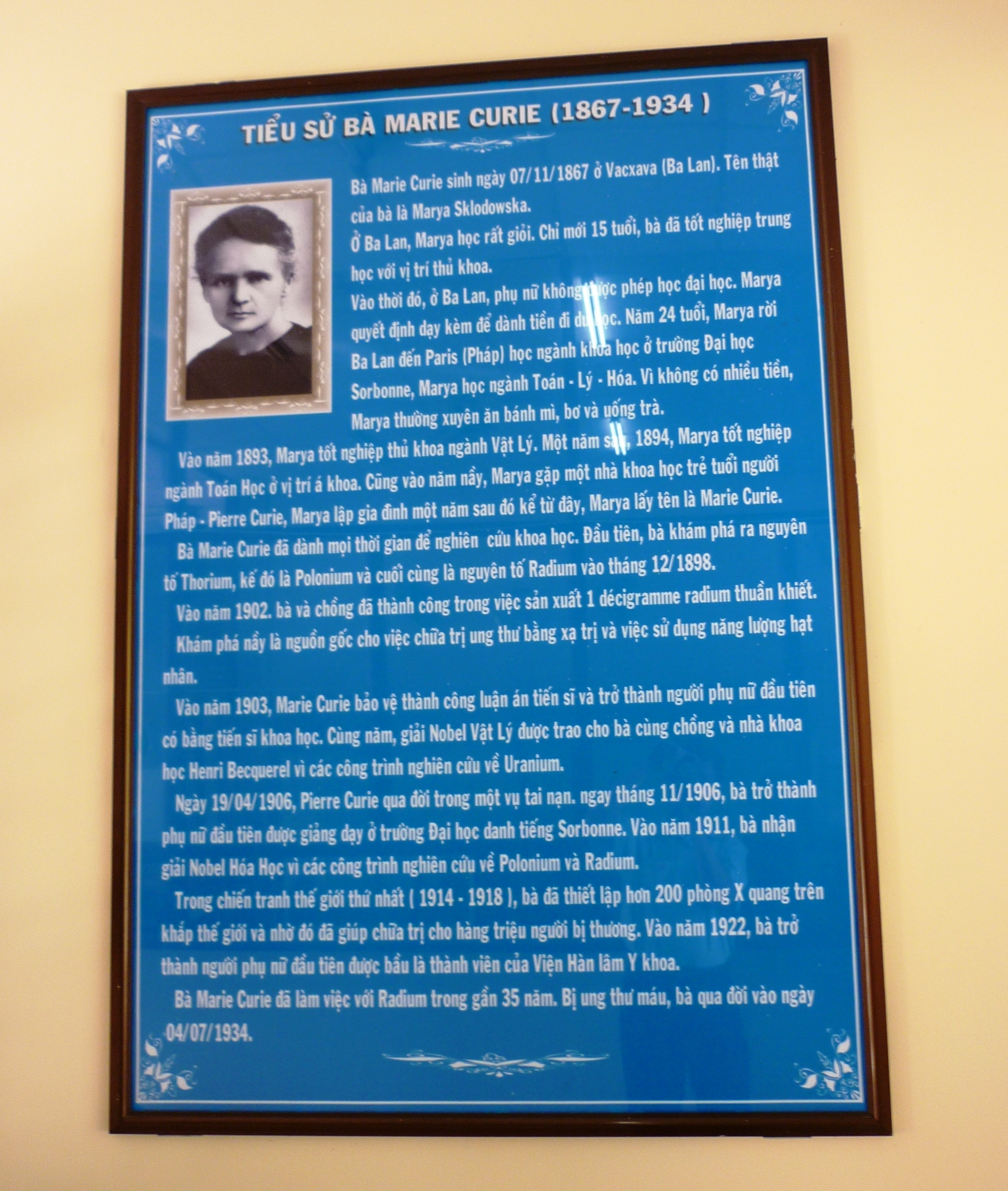
Biography of Marie Curie in Vietnamese

In 1975, the Ho Chi Minh City Education and Training Department took over the school and sent the French teachers back home to France. Lycée Marie Curie thereafter transitioned to a bilingual school - with classes taught in both Vietnamese and French. In 1997, the school transitioned from a private school to a semi-public one (it was not entirely controlled by the government, but it was also not entirely privately owned). During the late 1900s, Lycée Marie Curie was the largest co-ed high school in Vietnam (with over 5,000 students); however, the school reduced its enrollment size in order to prioritize providing a higher quality education (only about 3,500 students in 2025). The school has also become increasingly selective of who they accept. By 2007, the school became fully public and, as of 2025, has remained that way. The school's layout which was greatly influenced by French design principles remains mostly intact, as evidenced by the school's entrance gate.

== Research projects ==
A 2008 research project developed a training tool for teachers that provides a brief understanding of how to teach the concept of sustainable energy. Lycée Marie Curie and a few other pre-college level and college level institutions, participated in the project. Because this training tool is directed towards pre-college level institutions, Lycée Marie Curie was considered a fit candidate for the project. The school's teachers and students gained a new perspective on understanding sustainable energy from this project.

A 2021 study examined how bilingual students treat non-bilingual students at the same institution versus how they treat other bilingual students at a different institution. Conducted by Tam Kiet Vuong, Ho Fai Chan, and Benno Torgler, they found Lycée Marie Curie to be a great fit for the study as it had transitioned to a bilingual institution, teaching both Vietnamese and French. The study results concluded that students who are bilingual are more likely to be discriminatory towards non-bilinguals at the same institution than they are towards bilinguals at other institutions.

== List of Principals ==
Lycée Marie Curie

- 1948 – 1950: Madame Marie
- 1950 – 1954: Mrs. Fortunel
- 1954 – 1965: Mr. Castagnon
- 1965 – 1974: Mr. Gages
- 1974 – 1975: Mr. Thevenin

Marie Curie High School

- 1975 – 1977: Tôn Tuyết Dung
- 1977 – 1978: Lê Thị Loan
- 1978 – 1987: Trần Tố Nga
- 1987 – 1992: Hoàng Bảo Quân
- 1992 – 1999: Dương Thu Hằng
- 1999 – 2000: Nguyễn Bác Dụng
- 2000 – 2006: Nguyễn Đình Hân
- 2006 – 2008: Nguyễn Ngọc Lang
- 2008 – 2016: Nguyễn Văn Vân
- 2016 – 2023: Nguyễn Đăng Khoa
- 2023 - 2025: Nguyễn Vân Yên
- 2025 - now: Nguyễn Trần Khánh Bảo

== Notable alumni ==
- Bảo Thy, singer
- Đông Nhi, singer
- Loan Chau, singer
- Nguyễn Thiên Nga, Miss Vietnam in 1996
- Phuong Dung, singer
- Quang Vinh, singer
- Suboi, rapper, singer, actress
- Thanh Lan, singer
- Thuỳ Lâm, model, actress
- Tôn Nữ Thị Ninh, former Vice Chairman of the Foreign Affairs Committee of the National Assembly of Vietnam
- Trương Hòa Bình, Deputy Prime Minister of Vietnam
- Tuyet Nguyet, Asian art expert
- Võ Hoàng Yến, model
