= Ramon Villegas =

Filipino art curator (1953–2017)

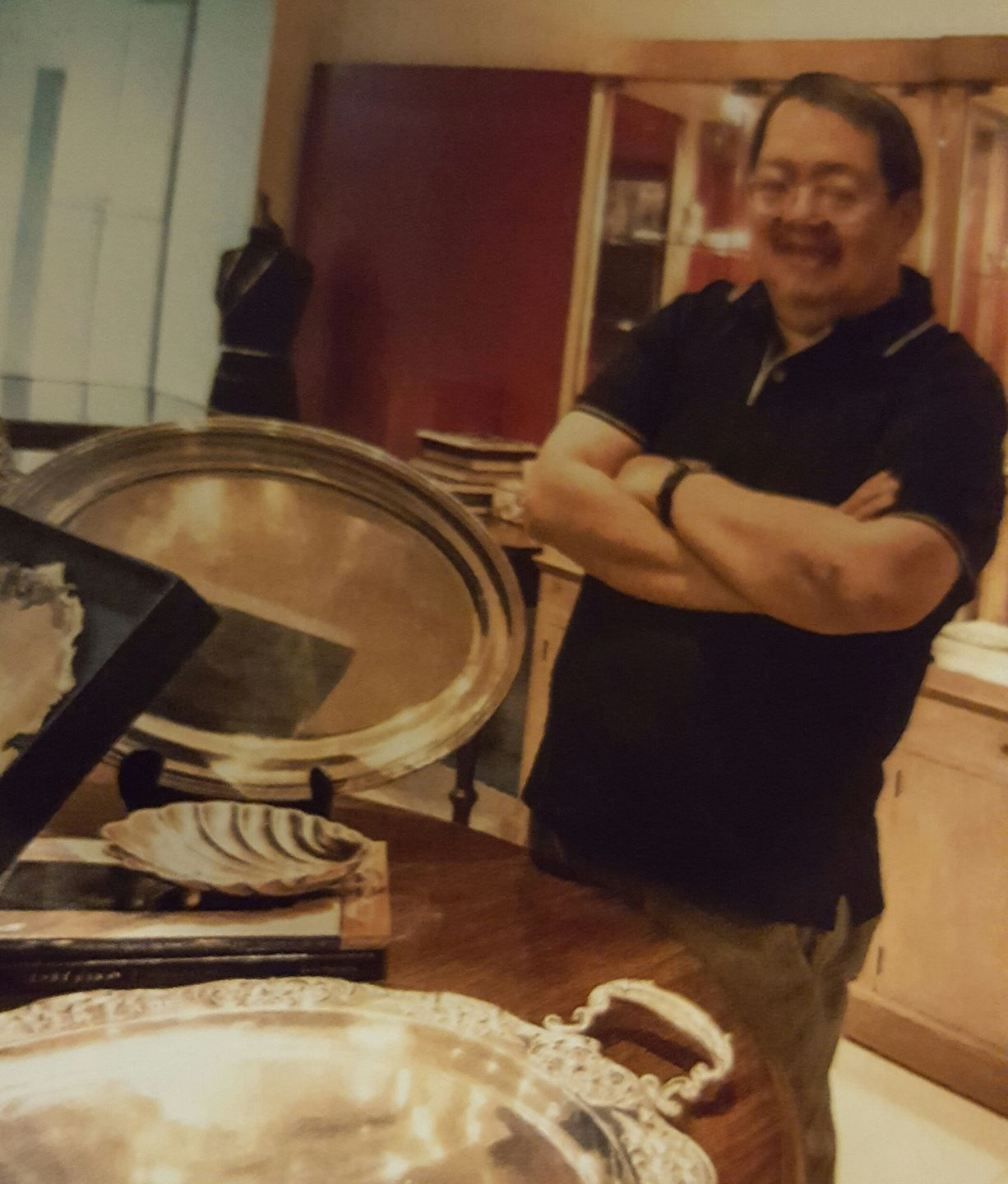
- Born: Ramon Nazareth Villegas; September 22, 1953; Manila, Philippines
- Died: August 6, 2017 (aged 63); Makati, Philippines
- Education: De La Salle University Manila (BA)
- Occupations: Curator; Author; Antiquities dealer Art historian Jeweller; Poet

Ramon Nazareth Villegas (September 22, 1953 – August 6, 2017) more popularly known as Mon Villegas or Boy Villegas, was a Filipino curator, art historian, jeweler, author, antiquities dealer, and poet. He was best known for chronicling the history of Philippine art and antiquities in various publications in both the Philippines and overseas. Villegas ran his own antique shop called Yamang Katutubo Artifacts and Crafts, which featured Philippine jewelry and antiques that closed on his death in 2017.

== Early life and academic career ==
Villegas was born in Manila on September 22, 1953, to Rosendo Villegas and Illuminada Nazareth of Batangas, who was herself a jeweler. Their family are descendants of the Philippine revolutionary general Miguel Malvar, who was one of the last generals to surrender during the Philippine–American War.

He finished his primary and secondary education at the La Salle Greenhills in 1966 and 1970 respectively, and graduated with a bachelor's degree in literature, with honors at the De La Salle University Manila in 1976. Later on, he served as a university lecturer teaching courses on Philippine literature and Philippine history. It was in this period, Villegas became part of the Galian sa Arte at Tula (GAT), a modernist group of like-minded poets that was spearheaded by the poet and academic Virgilio Almario, who subsequently be awarded as National Artist. The GAT was one of several literary organizations that fought against the martial law regime of Ferdinand Marcos through their literary writings. In 1987, Villegas along with other members of the GAT compiled their poems in an anthology titled Kamao: Panitikan ng Protesta 1970-1986 that was published in the aftermath of the People Power Revolution.

=== Recognition for Andres Bonifacio to be named as the first President of the Philippines ===
In 1994, in an essay titled Andres Bonifacio: Father of the Filipino Nation in a compiled publication, Tutuban: Progress and Transformation; Villegas along with fellow historians Milagros C. Guerrero and Emmanuel N. Encarnacion pushed for the recognition of Andres Bonifacio as the first President of the Philippines instead of Emilio Aguinaldo. Their thesis is based on his position of President or Supremo of the Katipunan revolutionary government from 1896 to 1897 and state that Bonifacio having established a government through the Katipunan prior to the Tejeros Convention. In their research, the documents that predate the elections at Tejeros and the First Philippine Republic, Bonifacio is called the president of the "Tagalog Republic" or Haring Bayan. Later on, their thesis was revised and updated in an essay titled Andres Bonifacio and the 1896 Revolution published in the National Commission for Culture and the Arts (NCCA) magazine Sulyap Kultura on with updated sources and information. The controversy on their proposal to recognize Bonifacio as the first Philippine President has since gained significant traction through the years, particularly during the 150th birth anniversary celebrations in 2013 with several academic sectors backing the proposal.

== Art historian, curator, and art advisor ==
Keen on his interests in art and antiquities, Villegas left the academe and pursued a career as an art historian. In 1983, Villegas published his first important publication on Philippine gold and jewelry, Kayamanan: The Philippine Jewelry Tradition for the Bangko Sentral ng Pilipinas (BSP), one of four publications for the monetary authority detailing their various holdings of Philippine art and antiquities. In 2005, Villegas and gallerist Evita Sarenas and fellow art dealer Pacifico Gonzales, Jr. helped catalog and appraised the entire BSP fine art collection. Villegas served as the permanent curator for the BSP gold and pottery collection that was previously exhibited at the Metropolitan Museum of Manila. Before his death, he served as the editor to Likha - Enduring Legacies of Filipino Artistry: The Decorative Arts Collection of the Bangko Sentral ng Pilipinas that cataloged the collection of Philippine decorative arts of the BSP and was published in 2017.

He also served in various capacities as an independent curator, and consultant for several public institutions including the Intramuros Administration, the Lopez Museum, the National Museum of the Philippines, the National Historical Commission of the Philippines, the Ayala Museum and the Museo De La Salle of the De La Salle University – Dasmariñas. Villegas served as an art advisor and helped appraise private collections held by the Ayala Corporation, the Bank of the Philippine Islands, Banco de Oro, PHINMA Property Holdings Corporation, and the United Coconut Planters Bank. He has also worked for the Asia Society, the Asian Civilizations Museum, the Musée du quai Branly – Jacques Chirac, and other leading international institutions.

As a leading curator and consultant, Villegas has help mount important international exhibitions on Philippine art and antiquities including Trésors des Philippines: Un archipel de rites (1994) at the Muséum national d'histoire naturelle in Paris, The Sheer Realities: A Celebration of Philippine Culture (2000) at the Grey Art Gallery in New York and the landmark exhibition on Philippine pre-Hispanic gold, Philippines, archipel des échanges (2013) at the Musée du quai Branly – Jacques Chirac.

Throughout his career, Villegas served as an appraiser and art advisor and cultivated a following amongst prominent Filipino collectors including Maria Theresa Virata, Richard and Sandra Lopez, interior designer Johnny Ramirez, Claude Mark Wilson amongst others.

In 2005, Villegas and gallerist Evita Sarenas of Finale Art File started Finale Auctions, one of the first modern auction houses centered on Philippine contemporary art that held a total of 13 auctions. From 2013 until his death in 2017, Villegas later served as a historical consultant for Leon Gallery Fine Art and Antiques, one of the leading auction houses in the Philippines and wrote essays on Philippine art, colonial art and colonial furniture for their auction catalogues.

Amongst the important collectors that Villegas represented through his career, his close association with Philippine art collector Paulino Que has been considered as one of his most enduring contributions in Philippine art. Through his expertises and advice on Philippine art, the Que collection is considered as one of the important private art collections in Southeast Asia. Villegas subsequently wrote two cover issues for the international art and antiquities magazine Arts of Asia that featured the Que collections of Philippine colonial furniture in 1991 and their collection of Philippine modern and contemporary art in 2004 respectively.

In 2013, Villegas collated over 51 important works of National Artist Hernando R. Ocampo from the Que collection and mounted a special retrospective on the artist called The Real H.R. Ocampo: From the Paulino Que Collection at the Ayala Museum that was subsequently published in an exhibition catalog authored by him. In 2021, the exhibition was virtually remounted by the Ayala Museum in honor of Ocampo's 110th birth anniversary.

== Antiquities dealer, jeweler, and gallerist ==
Since his childhood, Villegas took a keen interest in jewelry making with his experiences his family's own jewelry shop, Capricci. He later took ownership of the said jewelry shop, and was later renamed as Capricci Jewellers and Goldsmiths that specialized in contemporary jewelry designs and was situated at the Manila Garden Hotel (present-day Dusit Thani Manila). Villegas' own appreciation of Philippine art and antiquities, in turn, led to his career as an antiquities dealer. He later established Yamang Katutubo Artifacts and Crafts a shop centered on Philippine antiques, which subsequently transferred to the La'O Center in Makati that continued until he died in 2017.

In 1981, Villegas along with like-minded dealers including Terry Baylosis, Felix C. Sta. Maria, Edd Fuentes, Romeo Bauzon, and Osmundo Esguerra amongst others established the Antique Dealers Association of the Philippines (ADAP) and served as its founding president, and subsequently served as its chairman. Through their efforts, the ADAP organized the Manila Arts & Antiques Exhibition, one of the first Philippine antiquities fairs in 1982, and published its own exhibition catalog, with Villegas as its main editor.

== Death ==
Villegas died on August 6, 2017, in Makati, the Philippines at the age of 63. His personal collection was auctioned in 2018, consisting of Philippine colonial and modern art, ecclesiastical antiquity and ivory, Muslim craft, and jewelry.

In 2019, a dining table made by artisans from Bohol from the private collection of Villegas dating from the 19th century was sold for a record PHP467,200 (US$9,470) at León Gallery auction in Makati.

In 2020, his numerous essays on Philippine art were posthumously published in a special private publication León at Ten: 2010-2020 detailing the works that were previously auctioned by León Gallery in the past decade.

== Bibliography ==
Books and Publications

- Kayamanan: The Philippine Jewelry Tradition (1983)
- Pamanang Pilak: Philippine Domestic Silver (1990) (co-authored with Martin I. Tinio, Jr. and Regalado Trota Jose)
- Hiyas: The Philippine Jewelry Heritage (1997)
- Sining ng Panahong Ginintuan (1999)
- Batangas: Forged in Fire (2002) (as editor)
- Tubod: The Heart of Bohol (2003)
- Ginto: History Wrought in Gold (2004)
- Power+Faith+Image: Philippine Art in Ivory from the 16th to the 19th Century (2004) (co-authored with Regalado Trota Jose and Martin I. Tinio, Jr.)
- Herencia - A Legacy of Art and Progress: The Bank of the Philippine Islands Collection (2008) (co-authored with Cid Reyes, Jaime C. Laya, Alice Guillermo, Ma. Victoria Herrera and Nicanor G. Tiongson) (as editor)
- The Real H.R. Ocampo: From the Paulino Que Collection (2013)
- Filipinos in the Gilded Age: An Exhibition of Important Paintings, Ivory and Furniture (2014) (co-authored with Michael Manalo, Carmen Guerrero Nakpil and Lisa Guerrero Nakpil)
- Two Navels: Leon Curated Auction (2016) (co-authored with Lisa Guerrero Nakpil)
- Trove: The Coseteng Collection (2017) (co-authored with Lisa Guerrero Nakpil)
- House: A Collection of Paintings of Philippine Houses (2017) (co-authored with Lisa Guerrero Nakpil)
- Likha - Enduring Legacies of Filipino Artistry: The Decorative Arts Collection of the Bangko Sentral ng Pilipinas (2017) (co-authored with Corazon S. Alvina, Cynthia Ongpin-Valdes, Esperanza B. Gatbonton, and Martin I. Tinio, Jr.) (as editor)
- Mid-Century Moderns: Important Modernist Painting from the Philippine Art Gallery (2017) (co-author with Lisa Guerrero Nakpil) (Note: The book was posthumously published after Villegas' death in 2017.)
- León at Ten: 2010-2020 (2020) (co-authored with Augusto M.R. Gonzalez III and Lisa Guerrero Nakpil) (Note: The book was posthumously published in 2020.)

Contributor in Books and Other Publications

- Kamao: Panitikan ng Protesta 1970-1986 (1987) (edited by Alfredo Navarro Salanga)
- Classic Furniture in the Paulino Que Collection (1991, Arts of Asia)
- Life in the Colony (1998, Kasaysayan: The Story of the Filipino People) (co-authored with Ma. Serena I. Diokno)
- Consuming Passions (2003) (edited by Jaime C. Laya)
- The Paulino Que Collection of Paintings (2004, Arts of Asia)
- Juan Luna: Filipino Painter and Patriot (2004, Arts of Asia)
- Saga of La Naval: Triumph of a People's Faith (2007)
- A Passage to Asia: 25 Centuries of Exchange between Asia and Europe (2010) (edited by Jan van Alphen)
- Bigkis: Sangang Daan, Sa Iisang Daan (Mga Papel na Binasa sa Unang Pambansang Kumprerensya ng Bulacan at Pampanga para sa Sining, Kultura, at Kasaysayan) (2010) (edited by Jun Cruz Reyes)
- Philippines, archipel des échanges (2013) (edited by Corazon S. Alvina and Constance de Monbrison)
- Fashionable Filipinas: An Evolution of the Philippine National Dress in Photographs, 1860-1960 (2015) (edited by Gino Gonzales and Mark Lewis Lim Higgins)
