= Yifawn Lee =

Yifawn Lee is the founder of Asian Art Hong Kong (AAHK) and the publisher of Orientations magazine.

Lee earned her BA at Columbia University with a double major in East Asian languages and cultures and economics. She received her master's degree in Economics from the London School of Economics and Political Science before working in investment banking with Lehman Brothers in Hong Kong. She later took a further MA in East Asian art at Sotheby's Institute of Art.
