= Tuyet Nguyet =

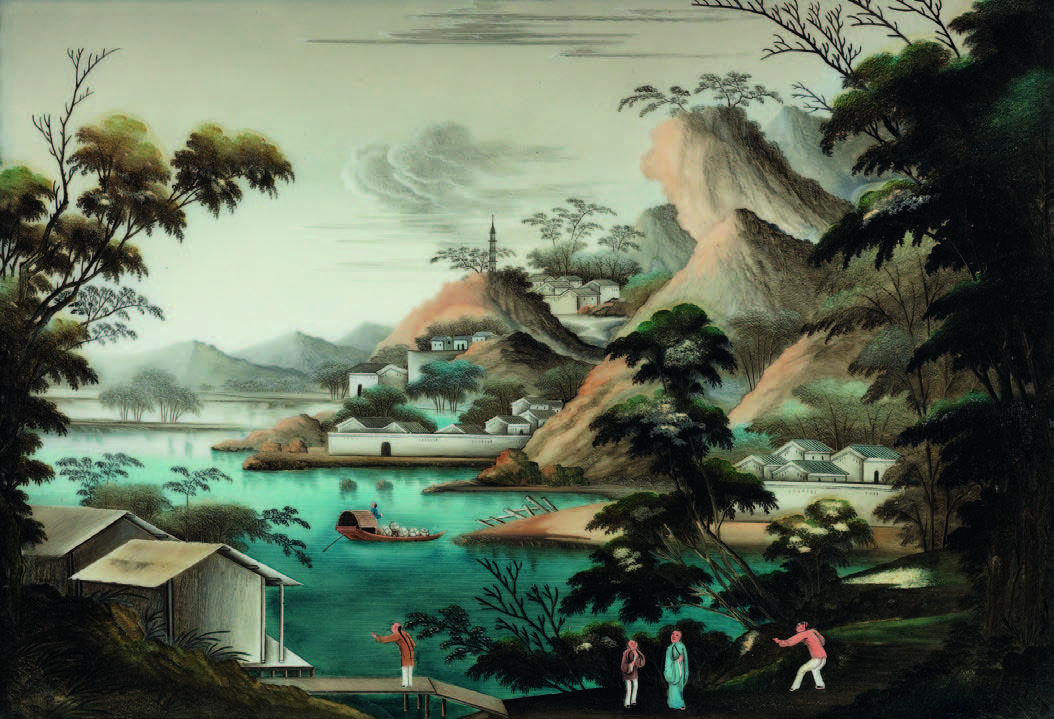
Village Visit, Anonymous. Late 18th/early 19th century, oil on glass. Nguyet-Markbreiter collection.

Tuyet Nguyet ("Snow Moon") is the Vietnamese publisher, editor and founder of Arts of Asia magazine which has been published continuously since 1970. Nguyet conceived of the magazine after her brother was killed in the Vietnam War in 1969.

== Early life ==
Nguyet was born in Tan An province, Vietnam, near the Mekong River in the south of the country. Her name means "Snow Moon" in English. Nguyet's father had attended university in Paris and graduated with a degree in agronomy. He was responsible for the introduction of fertilisers on the French model into Vietnamese rice farming. Her mother was a school teacher.

Nguyet was educated at the Lycee Maris Curie in Saigon. In 1955, she was awarded a scholarship to study Journalism at the Mundelein College in Chicago. She received her B.A. in journalism in 1958.

== Marriage & Hong Kong ==
In 1959, Nguyet married Stephen Markbreiter (deceased), an English architect, and moved to Hong Kong. The couple had four sons between 1960 and 1969.

In Hong Kong, Nguyet developed her journalistic skills while writing for Asia Magazine (the Sunday magazine for the South China Morning Post), the Far Eastern Economic Review, Agence France Presse, and Modern Asia.

== Asian arts ==
In 1969, after her brother was killed in the Vietnam War, Nguyet began to plan a magazine about Asian arts and a preview edition of Arts of Asia magazine was published in 1970 with the first regular edition appearing in 1971. In the magazine, Nguyet sought to combine authoritative content from experts with detailed coverage of the Asian art market. Since its establishment the magazine has chronicled, through its saleroom reports and articles on collections and collectors, the expanding market for Asian art in Hong Kong. The executive editor of the magazine is Nguyet's son, Robin Markbreiter.

In 2006, Nguyet helped to set up a vetting committee for the Asia International Arts & Antiques Fair (AIAA 2006) at the AsiaWorld-Expo in Hong Kong.

== Art collection ==
The Nguyet-Markbreiters formed an art collection from the early 1970s which was particularly strong in paintings on glass and mirrors. Parts of the collection were sold by Bonhams in Hong Kong in 2014.
