= Linna Huynh =

Canadian television presenter, actress and model

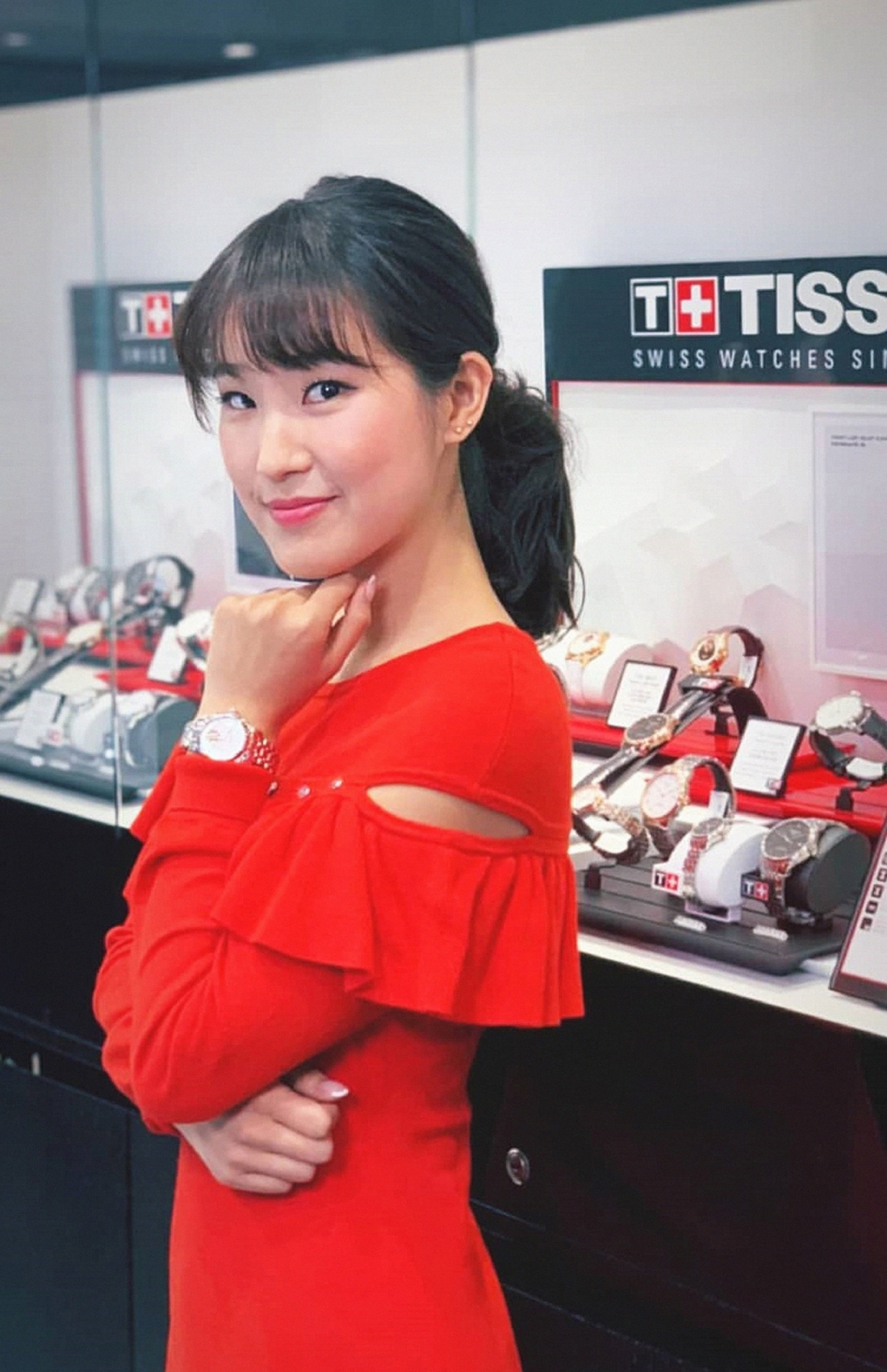
Linna Huynh

Linna Huynh (Chinese: 黃碧蓮, born 1 January 1991) is a Canadian television presenter, actress and model currently based in Hong Kong under contract with TVB.

== Early life ==
Huynh was born and raised in Vancouver with fifty-percent Vietnamese ancestry. She is the second of four sisters. She started to model while attending high school, gaining experience with bridal, fashion and makeup modelling before entering a local modelling competition in 2010.

== Career ==
Huynh was the lead female actress in the Vancouver-based, Asian-styled action movie Beyond Redemption.

She is currently a TV host at TVB, hosting Think Big (天地), a children's game show, as well as lifestyle programme Dolce Vita, home interior design programme 安樂蝸 Own Sweet Home, and Big Big Beauty 今期流行, in addition to TVBi Entertainment News show 1周八爪娛. Having limited skills speaking Cantonese, or reading and writing Chinese, Huynh has been assigned to working in variety programmes to further improve her Chinese before she is able to be considered for dramas.

Linna was in the 28th Artiste Training Class hosted by TVB.
