= Toto Gonzalez =

Filipino social historian (born 1967)

Augusto M.R. Gonzalez III
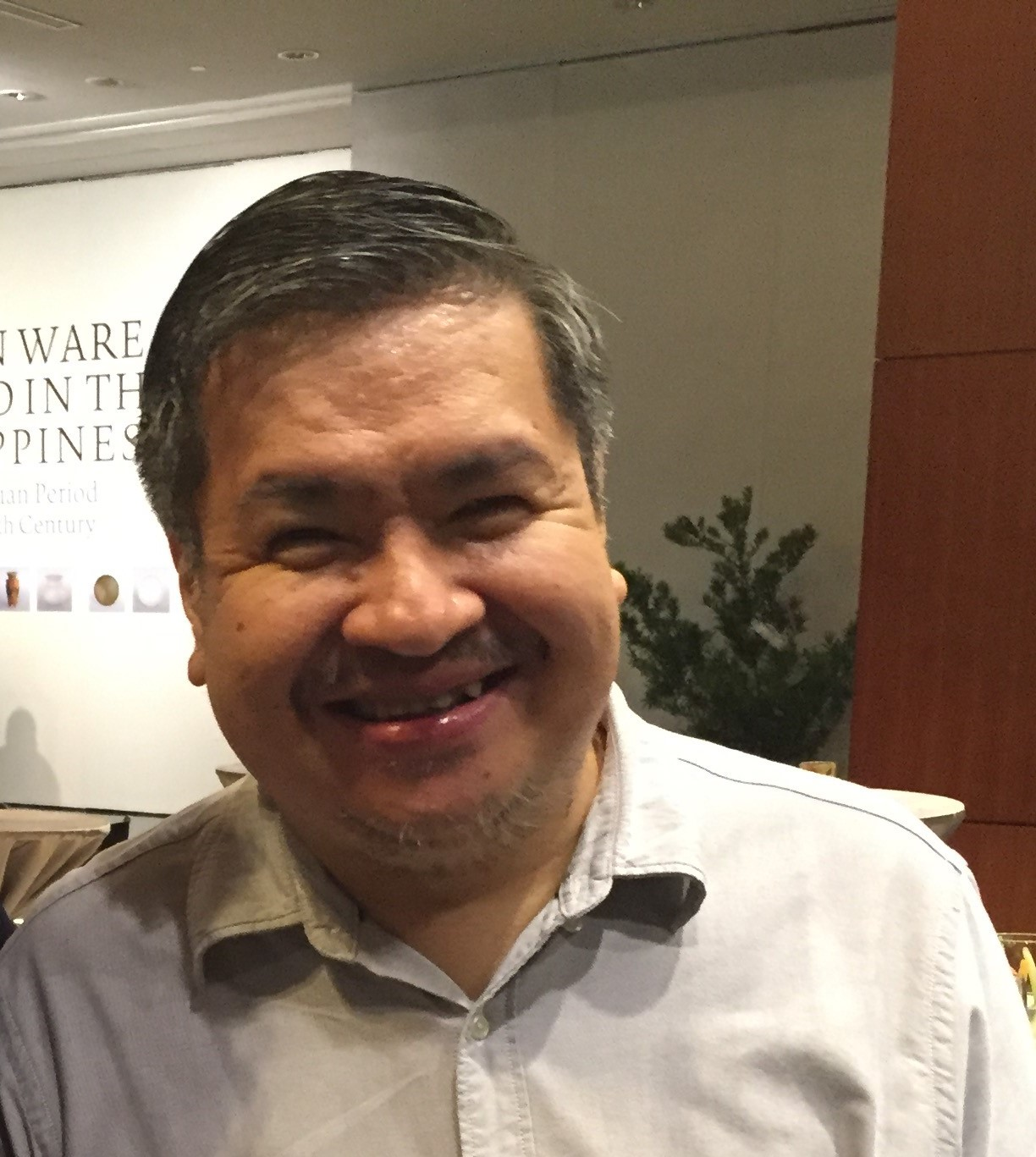
- Gonzalez in 2017
- Born: Augusto Marcelino Reyes Gonzalez III; 2 January 1967 (age 59)
- Education: De La Salle University Manila; University of the Philippines Diliman
- Occupations: Social Historian; Author; Antiquarian

Augusto Marcelino Reyes Gonzalez III (born 2 January 1967) more popularly known as Toto Gonzalez is a Filipino social historian, antiquarian, and writer. He is best known for chronicling the social history of the Philippines through Remembrance of Things Awry, a personal blog that details the histories and gossip of notable Philippine clans dating as far as the early 19th century.

== Personal life and career ==
He finished his primary and secondary education at the La Salle Greenhills in Manila. He later took courses at the De La Salle University Manila and the University of the Philippines Diliman. Gonzalez has had a keen interest in art and antiquities, due to his upbringing within the prominent Gonzalez family of Pampanga. His uncle, Brother Andrew Gonzalez previously served as the Secretary of Education from 1998 to 2001.

He is best known as a social historian through Remembrance of Things Awry, a personal blog published in 2006 that details the family traditions and histories of prominent Filipino families dating from the early 19th century including detailed histories of the Zóbel de Ayalas, the Cojuangco, the Lópezes among others. In 2016, Gonzalez contributed a new section dedicated to the prominent families of Manila in the new edition of Carlos Quirino's Old Manila that the Vibal Foundation republished.

Presently, he serves as a historical consultant for the León Gallery Fine Art and Antiques, one of the leading auction houses in the Philippines and has written numerous essays on Philippine colonial art and furniture for their auction catalogs.

== Bibliography ==
Contributor in Books and Other Publications

- Carlos Quirino's Old Manila: Second Edition (2016) (Carlos Quirino and edited by Ma. Eloisa P. de Castro)
- The Art and Times of the Seventies (2020) (co-authored with Corazon S. Alvina, Jaime C. Laya, Lisa Guerrero Nakpil and Marian Pastor Roces)
- León at Ten: 2010-2020 (2020) (co-authored with Ramon N. Villegas and Lisa Guerrero Nakpil)
