= Sonny Tinio =

Filipino historian (1953–2019)

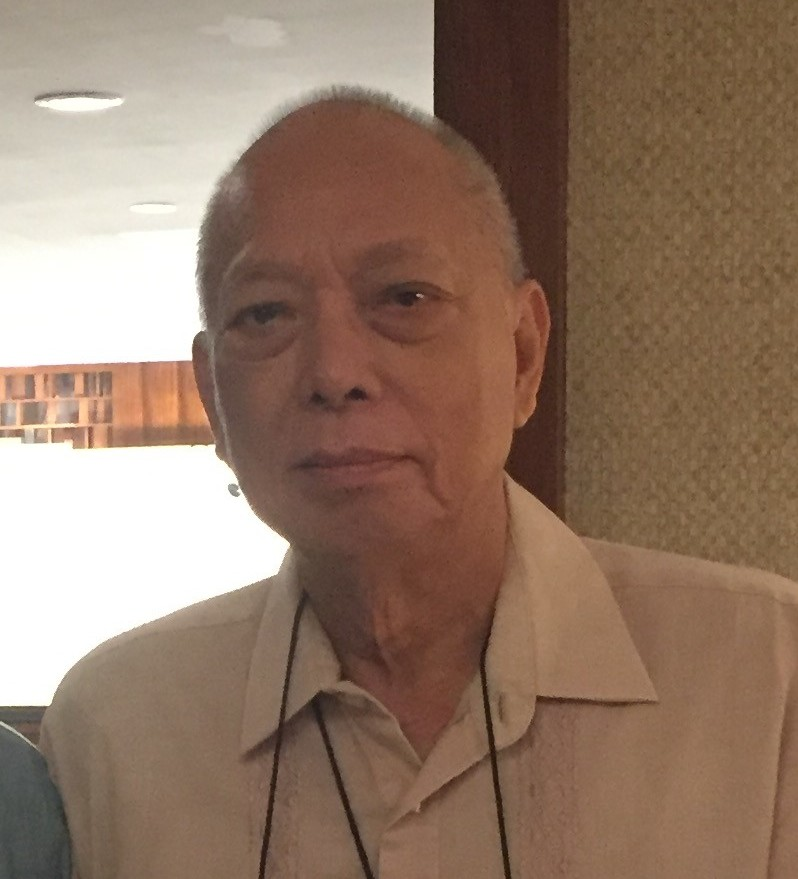
- Tinio in 2017
- Born: Martin Jesus Imperial Tadeo Tinio, Jr. June 25, 1943; Makati, Rizal, Philippine Commonwealth
- Died: July 9, 2019 (aged 76); San Juan, Metro Manila, Philippines
- Education: New York University (BA)
- Occupations: Antiquarian architect curator cultural worker interior designer
- Spouse: Maria Virginia Teehankee

Martin Jesus Imperial Tadeo Tinio Jr. (September 9, 1953 – July 9, 2019), more popularly known as Sonny Tinio, was a Filipino antiquarian, art historian, interior designer, architect, author, and cultural worker. He was best known for chronicling the history of Philippine colonial architecture and Philippine antiquities in various publications in both the Philippines and overseas.

== Early life and career ==
Tinio was born in Makati on September 9, 1953, to Martin Huerta Tinio and Benita Imperial of Nueva Ecija being the 11th of 13th children. Their family are direct descendants of the Philippine revolutionary general Manuel Tinio, who was the youngest general during the Philippine Revolution and the Philippine–American War and was Tinio' paternal grandfather. He subsequently married Maria Virginia Teehankee.

He finished his primary and secondary education at the De La Salle College in Manila and later took preparatory courses at the Institut Minerva, a vocational school in Zürich, Switzerland. He subsequently graduated with a bachelor's degree in commerce, at the New York University in 1965. He was well-versed in reading in eight languages including French, German, Italian, Spanish, Portuguese, Bikolano, Tagalog and Arabic. Since 1958, Tinio cultivated a passion for agriculture being himself a gentleman farmer, upon the receipt of one-thousand acres of land located in Brooke's Point, Palawan.

== Historical consultant and antiquarian ==
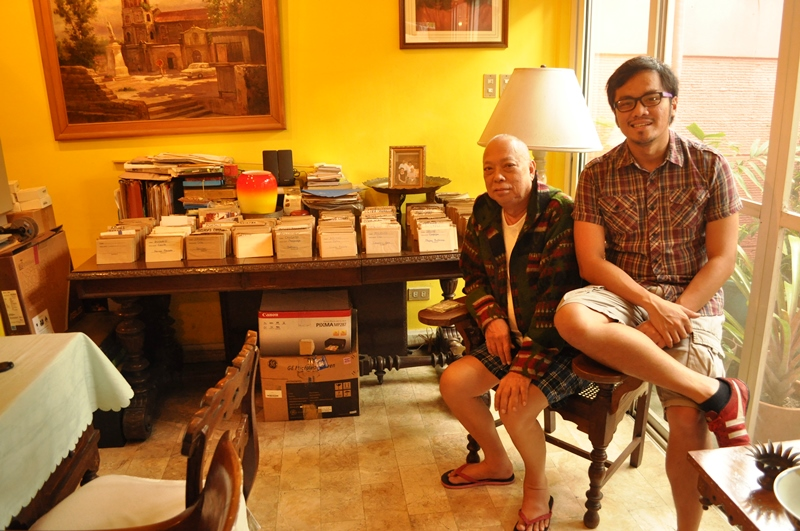
Tinio photographed with his photo collection with heritage activist Joel Aldor in 2014.

Tinio was known to have a keen interest in antiquities and furniture, he began his career as an antiquarian by writing articles for the Filipino Heritage series under the directorship of Philippine art critic Alfredo Roces on the recommendation of anthropologist Robert Fox in 1977.

From 1979 until 1985, Tinio was appointed as Consultant of Research and Publications Division of the Intramuros Administration (IA) by its first Action Officer Jaime C. Laya. During his term, he primarily conceptualized the Casa Manila, a museum in Intramuros depicting colonial lifestyle during the Spanish colonization of the Philippines, based on the 1850s San Nicolas house that was once located within the area. Prior to his death in 2019, Tinio served as the curator and consultant for the ecclesiastical collection of the colonial silver and furniture of the IA presently displayed at the Museo de Intramuros. He also served as the main curator for the Museo de Malacañang (present-day the Presidential Museum and Library) and helped in the redecoration of the halls based on architectural research from the National Archives of the Philippines.

He also served in various capacities as an independent curator, and consultant for several public and private institutions including the Ayala Museum, the Lopez Museum, the National Commission for Culture and the Arts, the Metropolitan Museum of Manila, the National Historical Commission of the Philippines, the Museo De La Salle of the De La Salle University – Dasmariñas, the Museo ng Kaalamang Katutubo, the Bangko Sentral ng Pilipinas and the Philippine Institute of Interior Designers (PIID).

From 2013 until his death in 2019, Tinio later served as a historical consultant for Leon Gallery Fine Art and Antiques, one of the leading auction houses in the Philippines, and wrote essays on Philippine ecclesiastical art and colonial furniture and wrote essays for their auction catalogs.

Tinio has written for numerous publications centered on his research and expertise on Philippine colonial furniture, religious imagery, ecclesiastical art and colonial silver that included Turn of the Century (published in 1978; co-authored and edited by Gilda Cordero-Fernando and Nik Ricio), Sanctuary Silver (published in 1981), Philippine Religious Images in Ivory (published in 1982; co-authored with Esperanza Buñag Gatbonton), Likha – Enduring Legacies of Filipino Artistry: The Decorative Arts Collection of the Bangko Sentral ng Pilipinas (2017; co-author and edited by Ramon Villegas) and countless contributions in various magazines, auction catalogs, and newspaper articles. In 2007, Tinio contributed to writing the chapter on Philippine furniture of Asian Furniture: A Directory and Sourcebook (published in 2007), a comprehensive guide on the history of antique Asian furniture.

== Interior designer and architectural historian ==
As a leading historical consultant on Philippine colonial architecture and furniture, Tinio dabbled as an interior designer and restorationist architect particularly on the interiors of 19th-century Philippine ancestral houses. He spearheaded in the restoration of the Villavicencio-Marella House in Taal, Batangas and the Baldomero Aguinaldo Shrine in Kawit, Cavite.

Throughout his career, Tinio began his systematic documentation of Philippine colonial architecture that served as the basis for the publications in the realm of Philippine architecture including Philippine Ancestral Houses: 1830–1930 which was co-authored with Fernando H. Zialcita in 1980. Subsequently, he wrote further on the subject with Philippine Heritage Homes: A Guidebook in 2014, co-authored with Jaime C. Laya and architect Maria Cristina Turalba.

Tinio was himself an amateur photographer in the photo documentation of all known ancestral houses across the Philippines. His photo collection was donated to the López Museum and Library in 2017 and later his architectural library was bequeathed to the De La Salle-College of Saint Benilde in Manila before his death.

== Death ==
Tinio died on July 9, 2019, in San Juan, Metro Manila, Philippines, at the age of 79 due to chronic kidney failure. His personal collection was auctioned in October 2019, that included pieces of Philippine colonial furniture and ecclesiastical art.

== Bibliography ==
Books

- Philippine Ancestral Houses: 1830–1930 (1980) (co-authored by Fernando H. Zialcita)
- Sanctuary Silver (1981)
- Philippine Religious Images in Ivory (1982) (co-authored with Esperanza B. Gatbonton)
- Pamanang Pilak: Philippine Domestic Silver (1990) (co-authored with Ramon N. Villegas and Regalado Trota Jose)
- Power+Faith+Image: Philippine Art and in Ivory from the 16th to the 19th Century (2004) (co-authored with Regalado Trota Jose and Ramon N. Villegas)
- Postura: Patis Tesoro (2008) (co-authored with Chit L. Lijauco)
- Philippine Heritage Homes: A Guidebook (2014) (co-authored with Jaime C. Laya and Ma. Cristina V. Turalba)
- Likha – Enduring Legacies of Filipino Artistry: The Decorative Arts Collection of the Bangko Sentral ng Pilipinas (2017) (co-authored with Corazon S. Alvina, Cynthia Ongpin-Valdes, Esperanza B. Gatbonton, and edited by Ramon N. Villegas)

Contributor in Books and Publications

- Filipino Heritage (1977) (edited by Alfredo Roces)
- Turn of the Century (1978) (edited by Gilda Cordero-Fernando and Nik Ricio)
- The World of 1896 (1998) (edited by Sandra B. Castro)
- Asian Furniture: A Directory and Sourcebook (2007) (edited by Peter Moss)
- Batangas: Forged in Fire (2002) (edited by Ramon N. Villegas)
- Consuming Passions: Philippine Collectibles (2003) (edited by Jaime C. Laya)
