= Degawa Tetsurō (art historian) =

Japanese art historian

Tetsurō Degawa (Japanese: 出川 哲朗, born 31 October 1951) is a Japanese curator and art historian specializing in Chinese and East Asian ceramics. From 2008 until 2022, he served as the director of the Museum of Oriental Ceramics, Osaka, having previously been a curator at the Ōtani Memorial Art Museum in Nishinomiya.

== Education and career ==
After studying quantum physics and mechanics, he earned a bachelor's and master's degree in Art and Fine Arts from Osaka University's School of Letters. He subsequently worked as curator for the Ōtani Memorial Museum in Nishinomiya, Japan, and, in 1987, joined the Museum of Oriental Ceramics, Osaka, becoming Director in 2008.

== Contributions and awards ==
In 2011, he was awarded the 32nd Koyama Fujio Memorial Prize, an award in the field of ceramics studies commemorating Koyama Fujio.

In 2017, he was instrumental in establishing a sister-museum partnership between the Museum of Oriental Ceramics in Osaka with Taiwan's National Palace Museum. The partnership was established after an Edo-period Imari plate from the Osaka Museum of Oriental Ceramics was found broken, during a loan to the National Palace Museum’s Southern Branch in Taiwan. Both museums concluded that the damage was not caused by mishandling and agreed on restoration in Taiwan using the traditional kintsugi technique. Shortly after the plate was restored, then-Director Tetsurō Degawa and NPM Director Lin Jeng-yi signed a memorandum of cooperation to strengthen institutional ties.

In 2025, Degawa gave a lecture on the life and work of Lucie Rie at the National Crafts Museum in Kanazawa, held in conjunction with a major retrospective of her work. Recalling his involvement in an exhibition of Rie's work in 1989, a time when she was still rather unknown in Japan, he emphasized Rie’s role in drawing new and younger audiences to ceramics in Japan.

== Publications ==
- Celadon of Yue Ware (1994), a museum catalogue with essays in Japanese and English.
- 明末清初の民窯 [Export porcelain in late Ming to early Qing], Vol. 10 in 中国の陶磁 10 [Chinese Ceramics] (1997), co-authored with Nishida Hiroko, Heibonsha Publishing.
- Hokusō Joyō seiji: Kōko hakkutsu seika ten / Northern Song Ru Ware. Recent Archaeological Findings (2009), Museum of Oriental Ceramics, Osaka. This catalogue of an exhibition held in 2009 contains an inventory of Ru ware (an extremely rare type of Chinese pottery) outside of China, which was long regarded as the most extensive inventory of Ru ware outside of China.
- アジア陶芸史 増補版 [Asian Ceramics from Prehistory to the Present] (2012), editor with others, Shōwadō, Kyoto pp. 356.
- Sailing the High Seas: A Special Exhibition of Imari Porcelain Wares (2015), co-authored with Hitoshi Kobayashi and others, National Palace Museum, Taipei.
- Porcelaine, chefs-d’œuvre de la collection Ise (2017), co-authored with Claire Déléry and others.
- 中国陶磁史 [History of Chinese Pottery and Porcelain] (2019), Science Press Tokyo Co., Ltd., ISBN 978-4-336-06316-8 supervisory translator with co-translators Tokudome Daisuke and Arai Takayuki, translation and expanded Japanese original edition from the original work in Chinese by Ye Zhemin, 中国陶瓷史 (2011), SDX Joint Publishing Co.Ltd.
