= Museum of Oriental Ceramics, Osaka =

The Museum of Oriental Ceramics, Osaka
- 大阪市立東洋陶磁美術館
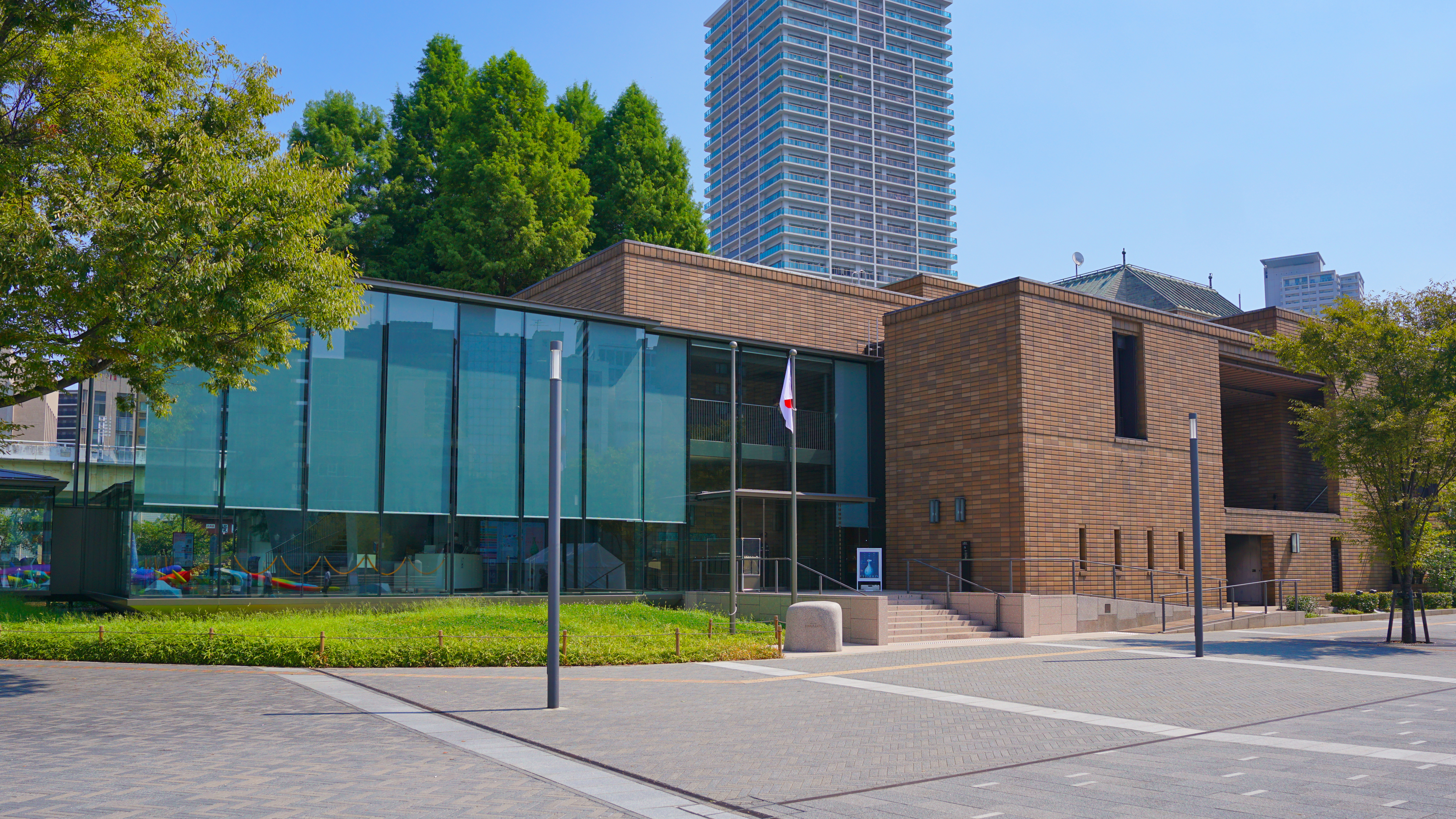
- Exterior of the museum

- Location within Japan
- Established: November 7, 1982
- Location: Osaka, Japan
- Coordinates: 34.693444°N 135.505472°E
- Type: Art museum
- Director: Degawa Tetsurō
- Website: moco.or.jp

The Museum of Oriental Ceramics, Osaka (大阪市立東洋陶磁美術館) is a Japanese art museum and regarded as one of the best ceramic-collections in the world. This museum collects, studies, conserves, exhibits and interprets East Asian ceramics, which mainly came from ancient China and Korea. The world-famous Ataka Collection, donated by the 21 companies of the Sumitomo Group, as well as the Rhee Byung-Chang Collection, provide the public an aesthetic experience with first-class collection.

== Collection ==
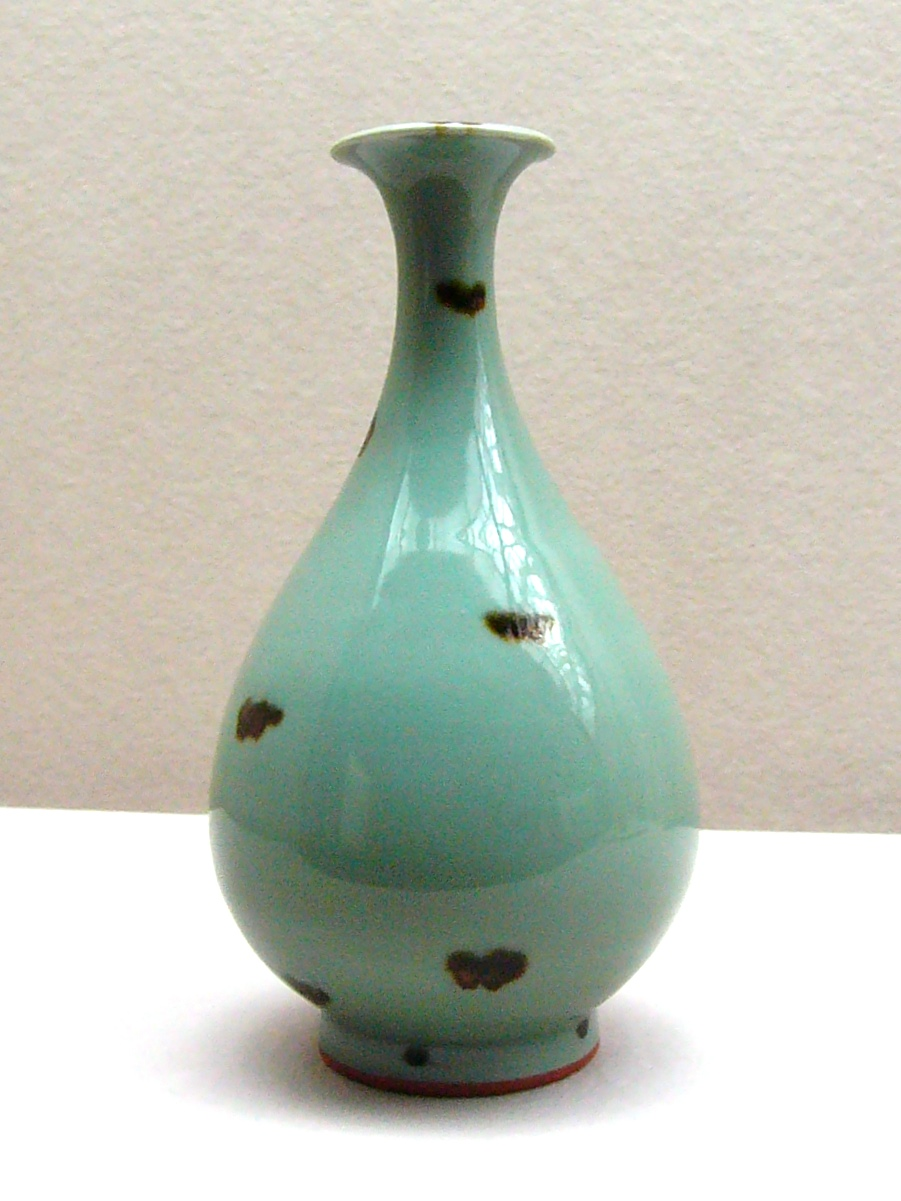
Celadon vase with Iron Brown Spots

=== National Treasures ===
- Celadon vase with Iron Brown Spots
- Tenmoku Glaze bowl with Silvery Spots

=== Important Cultural Properties ===
- Stoneware with Sgraffito Decoration of Peony with Transparent Glaze under Green Glaze
- Porcelain with Carved Lotus Design
- Porcelain with Incised Peony Scrolls Design Cut through Underglaze Iron-Coating
- Celadon with Carved Peony Scrolls Design
- Celadon vase with phoenix handles
- Tenmoku Glaze bowl with Leaf Design
- Blue-and-White with Fish and Water Plants Design
- Blue-and-White with Peony Scrolls Design
- Blue-and-White with Bird and Branch Design

== Publications ==
The museum has published a number of books about its collection and special exhibitions, including the following:

- The Story of Celadon: The Luminous Jade-Green Ware from East Asia (2025)
- The Lee Byung-Chang Collection of Korean Ceramics: Pure Beauty (2025)
- The Ataka Collection 101: Masterpiece Selection (2023)
- Ko-Kutani Ware of the Mr. and Mrs. Fukui Collection (2021)
- Tenmoku: The Beauty of Black Glaze Ware (2020)
- Object Portraits by Eric Zetterquist (2018)
- 300 ans de création à Sèvres: Porcelaine de la Cour de France (2017)
- The Beauty of Song Ceramics (2016)
- Charm of the Scholars Desk: Water Droppers of the Joseon Dynasty (2016)
- Kakiemon: Selected Works from the Yumeuzuras Collection (2011)
- The Pottery of Uno Soyo I (2009)
