= Orientations =

Hong Kong media publication

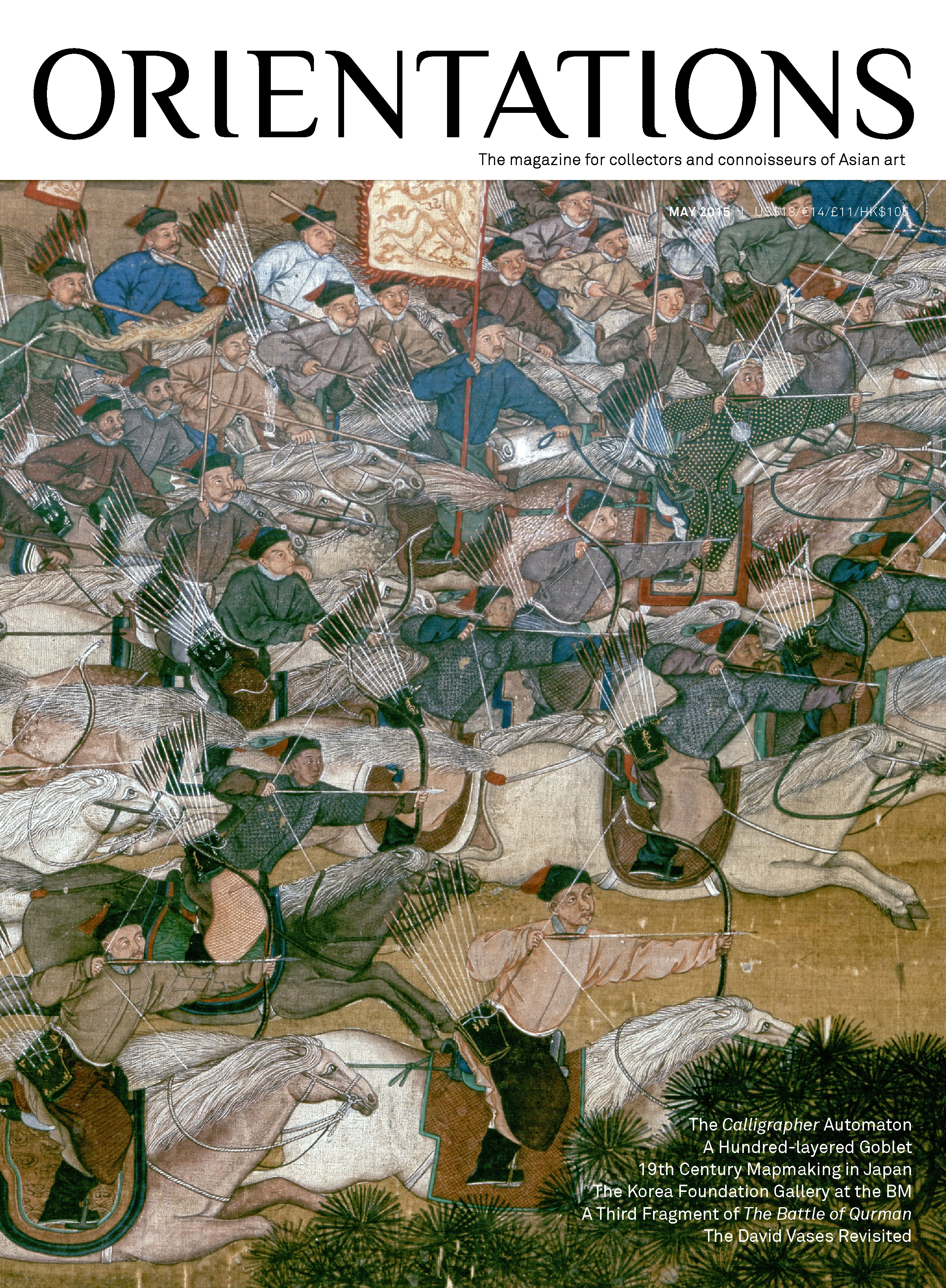
Orientations cover, May 2015. Detail of a fragment of an East Turkestan painting China, Beijing, Qianlong period (1736–95), 1760. Wall painting, ink and colour on silk, 44.5 × 90 cm. Private collection.

Orientations is a bimonthly print magazine published in Hong Kong and distributed worldwide since 1969.

== History ==
Orientations was launched in 1969 by Adrian Zecha (who was later the founder of Aman Resorts) to showcase Asian art and culture through a dedicated magazine. The name was a play on the word 'Orient' which was what Asia was referred to back then.

Under Elizabeth Knight in 1981, the editorial was reshaped to focus on Asian Art.

Yifawn Lee is the current publisher and editor who joined the magazine in 2008. In 2014, she founded Asian Art Hong Kong as a platform to provide art-related lectures and events. In 2021, Asian Art in Hong Kong was rebranded as Orientations Art Circle. In 2020, the print magazine was also launched as a digital edition.

== Description ==
Orientations is a bimonthly print magazine on the many and varied aspects of the arts of East and Southeast Asia, the Himalayas, the Indian subcontinent and the Middle East, from the latest scholarly research to market analysis and current news. The articles are contributed by leading academics and curators around the world and its readers are collectors, gallerists, academics and students.

OM Publishing is the book-publishing arm of Orientations Magazine Ltd. It produces a range of scholarly publications, including catalogues, monographs and artist books. The title, Beyond the Stage of Time: A Retrospective of Paintings by the Master of the Water, Pine, and Stone Retreat, was the winner of the Bronze Award, Hardcover category in the 2020 Gold Ink Awards, produced by Printing Impressions magazine.

== See also ==
- Arts of Asia
