= Kai-yin Lo =

Kai-yin Lo (Chinese: 羅啟妍) is an editor, designer, curator, collector and historian based in Hong Kong.

== Education ==
Lo was born in Hong Kong, then later attended the Convent of Holy Child Jesus in Sussex, England. She studied European History at Cambridge and London Universities.

== Background ==
Lo has edited several books in English and Chinese, including Classical and Vernacular Chinese Furniture in the Living Environment (1998); Bright as Silver, White as Snow: Chinese White Ceramics from Late Tang to Yuan Dynasty (1998); Living Heritage:Vernacular Environment in China (1999). The book House Home Family: Living and Being Chinese (English edition 2005; Chinese edition 2011) compiles cross-disciplinary essays from a symposium organized by Lo in 2001of leading Asian scholars.

As a collector, Lo has championed artists such as Xu Bing and Wu Guanzhong, many of whose works were destroyed during the Cultural Revolution. In 1992, Lo helped Wu to put on an exhibition at the British Museum. She was a founding member of Hong Kong's Cultural and Heritage Commission in 2000.

Lo is a visiting professor at Central Saint Martins, London, and at Central Academy of Fine Arts, Beijing. She is a board member of the Hong Kong Design Centre and M+ Museum at West Kowloon Cultural District, and a member of the Asia Pacific Art Acquisition Committee for the Tate Modern in London, and the Global Council, Museum of Arts and Design in New York.
