= Pinoy Big Brother: Kumunity Season 10 =

Pinoy Big Brother: Kumunity
- Season 10
- Title card
- Hosted by: Bianca Gonzalez; Robi Domingo; Kim Chiu; Melai Cantiveros; Enchong Dee; Richard Juan; Sky Quizon; Toni Gonzaga (until February 9, 2022)
- No. of days: 226
- No. of housemates: 46
- Winner: Anji Salvacion
- Runner-up: Isabel Laohoo
- Companion shows: PBB Kumulitan; PBB Kumulitan Weekends; PBB Kumunity: G sa Gabi; PBB Kumunity Updates
- No. of episodes: 221

Release
- Original network: Kapamilya Channel
- Original release: October 16, 2021 – May 29, 2022

Season chronology
- ← Previous; Connect Next → Gen 11

The tenth season of the reality game show Pinoy Big Brother, subtitled Kumunity (a portmanteau of "Kumu" and "community"), stylized as Kumunity Season 10, aired on Kapamilya Channel and A2Z for 226 days from October 16, 2021 to May 29, 2022.

This season is the second and final consecutive season to partner with the social-media app Kumu after Connect.

Using a similar, modified format of both Lucky 7 and Otso, the season revolved around three groups (known as "batches") of housemates, representing three Kumunities: celebrities, adults and teens. On the fourth and final batch, the top two housemates of each Kumunity, along with four other wildcard housemates chosen through challenges, competed for the four (later increased to five) spots in the finale.

After 226 days of gameplay, celebrity housemate Anji Salvacion was crowned winner against adult housemate Isabel Laohoo. Samantha Bernardo, teen housemate Rob Blackburn, and Brenda Mage were the finalists. Salvacion was the second celebrity winner in a combined season, and the fourth celebrity winner overall, since Daniel Matsunaga of All In in 2014.

== Development ==
On August 6, 2021, weeks before its official announcement on August 27, a PR stunt featured the Big Brother house facade surrounded by a blue construction barrier, accompanied by a large poster stating "A New Community Will Rise Soon." This stunt quickly went viral, generating widespread speculation among fans, celebrities, and former housemates about whether ABS-CBN planned to demolish the Big Brother house or if it was preparing for its tenth season.

=== Auditions ===
It's Showtime announced the season's auditions on August 27, 2021, during its noontime program. Due to the restrictions implemented in response to the COVID-19 pandemic at that time, the auditions (like the previous season) were conducted entirely online via Kumu. Each batch had different audition dates. The adult (ages 20–40) auditions began on September 1 and initially ended on September 30; the teen auditions (ages 15 to 19), scheduled to begin on December 1, were moved to November 6 during the first eviction episode as an early Christmas treat for the show's teenage viewers and ended on December 31, 2021. During the Teen Edition auditions, the ten participants with the "best audition clips" won ₱10,000 each. The show received 33,319 audition videos for the Adult Edition when auditions began, and producers extended the deadline for audition videos from October 16 to October 31.

During the run-up to the Celebrity Edition premiere, Kumu selected two celebrity housemates. The Online Bahay ni Kuya ("Online Big Brother House") campaign consisted of online voting and challenges to its participants. Jordan Andrews and Benedix Ramos were announced as the winners on October 15, and became housemates.

A second Online Bahay ni Kuya campaign was held for the Adult Edition to determine the three final adult housemates, one each for the male, female, and the LGBTQIA+ Kumunity. Andrei King, Kathleen Agir-Zarandin, and Roque Coting topped their respective Kumunities, becoming the three final housemates for the Adult Edition. They entered the house on Day 99 with Glenda Victorio, the season's second houseguest.

The last Online Bahay ni Kuya campaign was held for the Teen Edition. Unlike the previous adult Kumunity auditions, only one of the top 100 teen streamers (Paolo Alcantara) became a teen housemate.

=== COVID-19 ===
Like the previous season, the show's housemates, hosts, crew and staff underwent RT-PCR testing. The housemates had also been quarantined before their entry into the house, and health and safety protocols were implemented. No live audience was present, and the crews worked in a locked-in production.

On January 14, the show went on a five-day hiatus due to a surge in COVID-19 cases caused by the Omicron variant. During the break, never-before-seen recaps of the show in the adult batch aired in place of regular episodes.

=== Timeslot ===
The daily episodes of the season were aired at 5:45 p.m., while the weekend episodes were broadcast at 7:00 p.m.. The show replaced Everybody, Sing! on weekends, and aired in the Primetime Bida timeslot on weeknights. After the season finale, six post-season special episodes were aired on three weekends from June 4 to 19, 2022, before the show was replaced by the second season of Idol Philippines.

== Overview ==
=== Logo ===
The logo for Pinoy Big Brother: Kumunity Season 10 was somewhat different. The eye had motifs inspired by, and colors from, the Philippine flag and differed from the eye in the previous two seasons. The text colors also changed, spanning shades of blue and red, and the season text was bright yellow and orange.

=== House ===
The façade of the Big Brother house was repainted with the colors of the Philippine flag. Since the season began during the Filipino countdown to Christmas, the façade was decorated with lights and parol lanterns.

The interior of the house was renovated, with the color scheme in the confession room varying by edition: yellow for Celebrity, red for Adult, blue for Teen, and all three colors for Biga-10. No major changes were made, and it still follows the original layout used in Otso. The house added neon lights based on an edition's theme: lines from "Sikat ang Pinoy" for Celebrities, "Pinoy Tayo" for Adults, "Kabataang Pinoy" for Teens, and a combination of the three for Biga-10.

=== Hosts ===
Toni Gonzaga, Bianca Gonzalez, and Robi Domingo reprised their roles as the main hosts at the start of the season. On February 9, 2022, it was announced that Gonzaga was stepping down as the primary host; Gonzalez assumed her duties. Teen Edition 1 and Double Up Big Winners Kim Chiu and Melai Cantiveros, and former 737 houseguest Enchong Dee joined Gonzalez and Domingo three days later as the season's main hosts. Toni Gonzaga also reprised her role as the show's main host but later stepped down from the role. Gonzalez assumed Gonzaga's duties as the show's main host.

Former Otso Batch 4 housemate Sky Quizon and former 737 regular housemate Richard Juan hosted PBB Kumulitan and the weekend version of the companion show, replacing their main hosts. Juan also provided daily updates in PBB Kumunity Season 10 Updates.

The season's former housemates, including Eian Rances, Benedix Ramos, Karen Bordador, Jordan Andrews, the Juane siblings Nathan and Raf, Zach Guerrero, Seham Daghlas, third-place Samantha Bernardo and runner-up Isabel Laohoo hosted the online companion shows, were substitute hosts of PBB Kumulitan, and replaced Domingo on G sa Gabi. All appeared immediately after their eviction.

=== Theme songs ===
The season's theme song was "Pinoy Tayo", a Rico Blanco cover of Orange and Lemons' "Pinoy Ako" which debuted on ASAP Natin 'To and on the Adult Edition opening night with former Celebrity housemates Alexa Ilacad and KD Estrada; it was also used on the Adult and Biga-10 editions. The song, with elements of Filipino folk music, was composed by ABS-CBN music director Jonathan Manalo, Clem Castro, and Rico Blanco.

A cover of Toni Gonzaga and Sam Milby's "Sikat ang Pinoy", by the OPM band Agsunta and the Pinoy rapper Kritiko, was used with "Pinoy Tayo" in the Celebrity Edition. A cover of the Itchyworms' "Kabataang Pinoy" by the OPM band Nameless Kids was introduced in November 2021, was replaced with another cover by the P-pop groups BINI and SB19, and was the Teen Edition's main theme. The Nameless Kids song was also used to promote the Teen Edition.

Eviction songs were used in at least three of the season's editions. "Piece Of The Puzzle", written and performed by Trisha Denise Campañer, was used in the Celebrity Edition; "When I See You Again", written and performed by Alexa Ilacad and KD Estrada, was used in the Adult Edition; and "Dalampasigan", written and performed by Anji Salvacion, was used in the Teen Edition. "When I See You Again" and "Dalampasigan" were composed during Ilacad, Estrada, and Salvacion's stints in the Celebrity Edition.

=== Prizes ===
In the Celebrity Edition finale, it was announced that each Kumunity top-two housemate would receive ₱100,000.

The prize for the winner was ₱2,000,000, and ₱500,000 for the runner-up. Lastly, the third, fourth, and fifth "big placers" received ₱300,000, ₱200,000, and ₱100,000.

== Format ==
Three batches, known as Kumunities, would enter the house and compete for a top-two spot. After the teen batch, the top twos in each Kumunity and four evicted wildcard housemates would return to the house to compete for the Ultimate Big 5 and the season championship.

=== Twists ===
The following twists were implemented for all three batches:

- Head of Household – Carried over from the previous season, those who earned the title were granted immunity in the upcoming nomination week.
- Online Bahay Ni Kuya – Kumu users could become housemates after completing online tasks prepared by the show.
- Powers – Housemates in all Kumunities were given powers for completing tasks from Big Brother.
- Nomination Immunity Pass – Immunity for winners of tasks or challenges on or before their Kumunity's stay in the house, for a round of their choice.
- Kumunity Decides! – Kumu users, through an online poll on the show's daily livestream, could give virtual gifts to a housemate of their choice.
- The Ten Million Diamonds Challenge – The final five housemates in each Kumunity competed for a portion of the ten million diamonds to save themselves from eviction and reach the top two of their respective Kumunities

== Housemates ==
Several housemates would be identified daily on the show's social-media accounts and PBB Kumulitan, its online companion show, beforep each edition. More housemates were announced on the companion show during each edition's premiere, with the winners of the Online Bahay ni Kuya campaign revealed later.

The season had the second-largest cast (46) in the show's history, behind Otso's 58-housemate cast.

List of Pinoy Big Brother: Kumunity Season 10 housemates
Name	Age at entry	Hometown	Occupation	Kumunity	Day entered	Day exited	Status	Refs.
Biga-10
Anji Salvacion	19	Surigao del Norte	Singer	Celebrities	Day 211 Day 1	Day 226 Day 78	Winner	
Isabel Laohoo	26	Leyte	Entrepreneur and fashion designer	Adults	Day 211 Day 78	Day 226 Day 147	Runner-up	
Samantha Bernardo	29	Palawan	Beauty queen	Celebrities	Day 211 Day 1	Day 226 Day 77	3rd Place	
Rob Blackburn	19	Laguna	Traveler	Teens	Day 154	Day 226	4th Place	—
Brenda Mage	32	Cagayan de Oro	Comedian and vlogger	Celebrities	Day 211	Day 226	5th Place	
Brenda Mage	32	Cagayan de Oro	Comedian and vlogger	Celebrities	Day 1	Day 77	Evicted	
Stephanie Jordan	16	Cebu	Singer	Teens	Day 210	Day 225	Evicted	
Stephanie Jordan	16	Cebu	Singer	Teens	Day 155	Day 210	Evicted	—
Gabb Skribikin	19	Pasig	Idol performer	Teens	Day 154	Day 225	Evicted	—
Zach Guerrero	22	Aurora	Dentistry student	Adults	Day 211	Day 225	Evicted	
Zach Guerrero	22	Aurora	Dentistry student	Adults	Day 78	Day 147	Evicted	
Nathan Juane	33	Las Piñas	Flight instructor	Adults	Day 211 Day 77	Day 225 Day 147	Evicted	
Michael Ver Comaling	21	Leyte	Modern pentathlete	Adults	Day 211	Day 225	Evicted	
Michael Ver Comaling	21	Leyte	Modern pentathlete	Adults	Day 78	Day 147	Evicted	
Comeback Housemates
Madam Inutz	36	Cavite	Online seller & Social media personality	Celebrities	Day 211	Day 217	Evicted	
Madam Inutz	36	Cavite	Online seller & Social media personality	Celebrities	Day 1	Day 77	Evicted	
Maxine Trinidad	18	Davao City	Influencer and athlete	Teens	Day 210	Day 216	Evicted	
Maxine Trinidad	18	Davao City	Influencer and athlete	Teens	Day 154	Day 210	Evicted	
Teens
Paolo Alcantara	15	Nueva Ecija	Influencer	Teens	Day 155	Day 210	Evicted	—
Tiff Ronato	19	Northern Samar	Accountancy student	Teens	Day 154	Day 204	Evicted	—
Dustine Mayores	19	Marikina	Streamer and model	Teens	Day 154	Day 204	Evicted	—
Eslam El Gohari	17	Makati	Model	Teens	Day 154	Day 197	Evicted	—
Luke Alford	17	Batangas	Actor and singer	Teens	Day 154	Day 197	Evicted	—
Ashton Salvador	18	Quezon City	Actor and model	Teens	Day 154	Day 190	Evicted	
Stef Draper	15	Parañaque	Student-athlete	Teens	Day 154	Day 183	Evicted	—
Kai Espenido	18	Surigao del Norte	Surfer and model	Teens	Day 154	Day 176	Evicted	
Don Hilario	19	Laguna	Vlogger	Teens	Day 154	Day 169	Evicted	—
Adults
Seham Daghlas	23	Iloilo	Vlogger and influencer	Adults	Day 78	Day 147	Evicted	
Raf Juane	25	Las Piñas	Vlogger	Adults	Day 77	Day 141	Evicted	
Laziz Rustamov	24	Tashkent, Uzbekistan	Model	Adults	Day 78	Day 141	Evicted	
Roque Coting	24	Davao de Oro	Salesman	Adults	Day 99	Day 133	Evicted	
Gin Regidor	21	Cebu	Cemetery vendor	Adults	Day 78	Day 133	Evicted	
Kathleen Agir-Zarandin	25	United States	Caregiver	Adults	Day 99	Day 133	Evicted	–
Basti Macaraan	22	Milan, Italy	Fast food service crew	Adults	Day 97	Day 126	Evicted	
Jaye Macaraan	26	Milan, Italy	Fast food service crew	Adults	Day 97	Day 126	Evicted	
Aleck Iñigo	23	Las Piñas	Delivery rider and athlete	Adults	Day 78	Day 119	Evicted	
Rica Kriemhild	22	Bologna, Italy	Theatre actress and vlogger	Adults	Day 97	Day 119	Evicted	–
Andrei King	25	Taguig	Content creator and vlogger	Adults	Day 99	Day 112	Evicted	
Thamara Alexandria	22	Davao City	Model and actress	Adults	Day 78	Day 112	Evicted	
Celebrities
Alyssa Valdez	28	Batangas	Professional volleyball player	Celebrities	Day 1	Day 78	Voluntary exit	
Alexa Ilacad	21	Pasig	Actress and singer	Celebrities	Day 1	Day 71	Evicted	
KD Estrada	19	Parañaque	Musician	Celebrities	Day 1	Day 71	Evicted	
Jordan Andrews	31	London, UK	Theatre actor and online streamer	Celebrities	Day 19	Day 64	Evicted	
Eian Rances	28	Quezon	Actor, online streamer	Celebrities	Day 1	Day 64	Evicted	
Shanaia Gomez	19	Quezon City	Actress	Celebrities	Day 1	Day 57	Evicted	
Benedix Ramos	27	Pangasinan	Actor & content creator	Celebrities	Day 17	Day 57	Evicted	
Karen Bordador	29	Makati	Radio disc jockey and vlogger	Celebrities	Day 1	Day 51	Evicted	
TJ Valderrama	35	Manila	Comedian	Celebrities	Day 1	Day 51	Evicted	
Kyle Echarri	18	Cebu	Actor and singer	Celebrities	Day 5	Day 43	Evicted	
Chie Filomeno	25	Rizal	Actress and model	Celebrities	Day 5	Day 36	Evicted	
Albie Casiño	28	Quezon City	Actor	Celebrities	Day 12	Day 29	Evicted	
John Adajar	30	Laguna	Mixed martial artist and model	Celebrities	Day 1	Day 22	Evicted	

List of Kumu-selected housemates
Name	Age	Hometown	Kumunity	Diamonds (in millions)	Result
Celebrities
Jordan Andrews	31	London, UK	Celebrity Kumunity	31.98	Housemate
Benedix Ramos	27	Pangasinan	Celebrity Kumunity	31.28	Housemate
Jessica Marie Dungo	28	Makati	Celebrity Kumunity	29.84	Not selected
Princess Jeal Tanjueco	22	Bulacan	Celebrity Kumunity	27.91	Not selected
Jeffrey Esplana	21	Camarines Sur	Celebrity Kumunity	26.57	Not selected
Adults
Andrei King	26	Taguig	Adult Male Kumunity	52.03	Official Housemate
Jeffrey Esplana	21	Camarines Sur	Adult Male Kumunity	20.47	Not selected
Jeremy Favia	35	Quezon City	Adult Male Kumunity	15.60	Not selected
Justine Bactol	25	Agusan del Sur	Adult Male Kumunity	6.12	Not selected
Brylle Vincent Labuanan	26	Cagayan de Oro	Adult Male Kumunity	2.27	Not selected
Kathleen Agir-Zarandin	25	United States	Adult Female Kumunity	51.79	Official Housemate
Princess Jeal Tanjueco	22	Bulacan	Adult Female Kumunity	37.91	Not selected
Maria Micole Veatrizze Dy	21	Manila	Adult Female Kumunity	32.29	Not selected
Marylene Arellano	29	Batangas	Adult Female Kumunity	4.05	Not selected
Niña Demata	26	Quezon City	Adult Female Kumunity	0.85	Not selected
Roque Coting	24	Davao de Oro	Adult LGBTQIA+ Kumunity	16.22	Official Housemate
Universe Ramos	26	Los Angeles, USA	Adult LGBTQIA+ Kumunity	12.82	Not selected
Kara Mendez	36	Rizal	Adult LGBTQIA+ Kumunity	11.91	Not selected
Bella Ferrer	33	Japan	Adult LGBTQIA+ Kumunity	7.66	Not selected
Mlui Sangalang	29	Bulacan	Adult LGBTQIA+ Kumunity	0.17	Not selected
Teens
R-Jei Czymond Balita	17	Italy	Teen Kumunity	26.17	Not selected
Alyanna Ramos	15	New York, USA	Teen Kumunity	15.44	Not selected
John Paolo Alcantara	15	Nueva Ecija	Teen Kumunity	11.97	Official Housemate
Samantha Cady Jaucian	15	Albay	Teen Kumunity	11.25	Not selected
Kristine Marzan	18	New Zealand	Teen Kumunity	11.19	Not selected

== Houseguests ==
=== Celebrities ===
- Day 33: 2020 Tokyo Olympics silver medalist Nesthy Petecio gave a message to the housemates, and then declared the Pinoy Big Brother Games 2021 open.
- Day 34: 2020 Tokyo Olympics bronze medalist Eumir Marcial sent a good luck greeting to the housemates before their land swimming competition in the Pinoy Big Brother Games 2021.

=== Teens ===
- Online
  - Day 178: John Bradley "Jan-Jan" Ronato, Tiff's autistic brother, got to spend time with Tiff and the housemates through Zoom in occupational therapy and mathematics sessions as part of her sacrifice task.
  - Day 184: As a response to the widely criticized History Quiz Bee, historian Xiao Chua was invited to help Big Brother in re-educating the housemates in learning Philippine history as part of their History Week task.
  - Day 196: Lilibeth and Simon Alford, Luke's parents, appeared virtually on Zoom to have a talk with Luke in the confession room, especially to his father that he had not been seen for 11 years.
  - Day 204: Paz Blackburn and Nelflor Jordan, Rob and Stephanie's respective mothers, appeared virtually to have one-on-one chat with Rob and Stephanie as a reward for completing the How Well Do You Know Each Other task.
- In person
  - Day 178: Paz Blackburn and Ana Marie Lim, Rob and Ashton's respective mothers, were invited inside as they were to see Rob and Ashton separately as part of their secret tasks. Prior to this, the mothers were given a task and helped Eslam and Stef in their secret task for the two boys. Rob was able to spend time with Paz with a fine dining dinner date, while Ashton had the same with Ana Marie with a picnic table date.
  - Day 186: JC Alcantara entered the house to perform tasks with Tour Group members before reuniting with brother Paolo in the Museum Group. Bonifacio "Tatay Dennis" Alcantara, Paolo's father, joined JC and the Tour Group as they enter the Museo ni Kuya witnessing the Museum Group recreate Paolo's family picture in their human diorama challenge with JC joining in, and reunite with Paolo for a brief period.
  - Day 194: P-pop groups MNL48 (Coleen, Ella, and Jem) and SB19 entered the house as mentors to teach the housemates in singing and dancing choreography in preparation for the upcoming The Big KumuniTeen Summer Concert weekly task. SB19 would go on to stay inside the house and be with the housemates in the coming days until the time of their concert, while MNL48 exited the house the same day after their entrance.
  - Day 196: Elizabeth El Gohari, Eslam's mother, entered the house to celebrate Eslam's birthday celebration and reunited with him along with the other housemates and SB19 for a brief period of time.
  - Day 204: Evelyn Alcantara, Flora Mae Trinidad, Jessica Ronato, Marianne Mayores, and Rosalinda Skribikin, the respective mothers of Paolo, Maxine, Tiff, Dustine, and Gabb, entered the house to help the housemates in cleaning the house while wearing PPEs before eventually reuniting with the housemates to celebrate Mother's Day inside the house.

=== Biga-10 ===
- Day 221: Ex-housemates Eian Rances from Celebrity Edition, Laziz Rustamov of Adult Edition, and Luke Alford of Teen Edition re-entered the house as ninjas before eventually reuniting with the Biga-10 housemates to help them in completing their Stacking Colored Tower Cups weekly task.

=== Houseplayers ===
Marky Miranda was the season's first adult houseplayer. Impressing the housemates with his strong personality, he posed as a late-entry housemate and acted erratically. After drinking whiskey while Zach Guerrero was celebrating his birthday, Miranda confronted Guerrero, Nathan Juane, and Michael Ver Comaling; they apologized he following day.

Jannene Anne "Ja" Nidoy was the season's second adult houseplayer. Entering on the same day as Miranda, she became friends with Raf Juane, Seham Daghlas, and the Adult Final Five shortly after their exit.

List of Pinoy Big Brother: Kumunity Season 10 houseplayers
Name	Age on Entry	Hometown	Occupation	Day entered	Day exited	Status
Adults
Ja Nidoy	21	Laguna	Social media influencer and vlogger	Day 136	Day 142	Exited
Marky Miranda	27	Cavite	Entrepreneur and theatre actor	Day 136	Day 142	Exited
Teens
Yanna Fontanilla	19	Baguio	Student-athlete	Day 205	Day 209	Exited
David Charles Longinotti	18	Nueva Vizcaya	Streamer	Day 205	Day 209	Exited
Ika Dimaculangan	19	Laguna	Online seller and streamer	Day 205	Day 209	Exited

Houseplayer campaign results for Adult Edition
Houseplayer 1 Campaign Top Earners (from January 22–27, 2022)				Houseplayer 2 Campaign Top Earners (from February 5–10, 2022)			
Rank	Name	Diamonds earned (in millions)	Result	Rank	Name	Diamonds earned (in millions)	Result
1	Marky Miranda	13.26	Selected	1	Marco Roxas	6.55	Not selected
2	Shanna May	11.89	Not selected	2	Kobe Medalla	4.06	Not selected
3	Mark Fayo Hilongo	10.59	Not selected	3	Niña Demata	3.25	Not selected
4	Jun Sunga	10.25	Not selected	4	Marylene Arellano	3.06	Not selected
5	Kimpoy Feliciano	7.90	Not selected	5	Jannene Anne Nidoy	2.80	Selected

Houseplayer campaign results for Teen Edition
Rank	Name	Diamonds earned (in millions)	Result
1	Jana Indanan	4.31	Not selected
2	Zed Anda	4.30	Not selected
3	Erica Dimaculangan	4.26	Selected
4	Kimberly Cryztal Jaucian	4.21	Not selected
5	David Charles Longinotti	3.49	Selected
6	Miguel Luis Arrieta	3.04	Not selected
7	Darlyn Villanueva	2.99	Not selected
8	Alyanna Fontanilla	2.98	Selected
9	Venize Villadolid	2.50	Not selected
10	Kriziah Torrefiel	2.49	Not selected

== Tasks ==
=== Weekly tasks ===
Task No.	Date given	Task title and description	Result
Celebrities
1	October 17 (Day 2)	Pa-Mine Pa More (I'll Take More); The housemates were tasked to sell online all the 500 items given throughout the week. They were given the discretion in how much they will price the items. During the live online selling, the housemates were only allowed to sell once the bell sound was played and were only allotted three hours per day to do the task. Also as a reward for the task, the amount they will earn will be given to their loved ones or their chosen charity. At the end of the task, the housemates had earned ₱21,740; they chose to give the entire earnings to the female BJMP detainees where Karen was previously incarcerated.	Passed
2	October 25 (Day 9)	Takot ang Pinoy (Pinoy is Afraid); The housemates have to create, write, and produce a live 30-minute horror musical play. As part of the twist for this task, two of the major characters of their play were selected via Kumunity Decides, and the result thereof was only revealed minutes before the start of the said play. To win this task, they need to get a total of 80,000 average viewers across Facebook, Kumu and Kapamilya Online Live. Total average viewership: Facebook / Kumu / Kapamilya Online Live / Total; 3,675 / 43,896 / 58,423 / 105,994	Passed
3	November 3 (Day 19)	Tumba Table (Tippy Table); Similar to the Otso season's Batch-Bakan Challenge, one at a time, the housemates had to place 170 blocks on a hanging but unstable table. If ever a block falls or tumbles on or off the table, they will have to restock their blocks from the start. Only one pair of housemates at a time can place each of their blocks on the table. They will need to stock all blocks in a standing or horizontal position and they must finish this task within one hour.	Failed
4	November 9 (Day 25)	Sa Linyang Kainan (Online Restaurant); The housemates were tasked to cook and serve two specialty dishes of their own choice: one Filipino dish and one international dish (they chose Sisig and Ramen). The dishes will be served in a pre-order basis and will be made available to all Metro Manila residents only. The show had partnered with Grab Express for the delivery of the dishes they have prepared. One of the basis to determine if they will be successful with this task is from the customers' feedbacks (the housemates must gain at least 1000 aggregate star rating). The proceeds from the income they have earned from this task, including the online livestream jam, will be given to the Philippine Mental Health Association.	Passed
5	The housemates were given their fifth weekly task while they were also participating in the Pinoy Big Brother Games 2021. However, the entire task was not broadcast by the show and was only partially streamed via Kumu. The entire mechanics and the outcome of this weekly task remained unknown.		
6	November 23 (Day 39)	PBB Arcade; For the entire week, the housemates must be able to earn a total of 100 tickets by playing games prepared by Big Brother. In addition to this, they were also instructed to freeze themselves and act as toys (while wearing their toy costumes) when they will hear the sound of a "person walking," as if they were being checked by such person (which was revealed to be the housemates' loved-ones). This is akin to the Toy Story movie franchise wherein the toys don't move when any human is around. They will only be allowed to move once the same sound will be played to them again. Also, at the start of the day, a "magical sound" will be played to alert them that they have to don immediately their toy costumes. In any instance where each of them had moved despite the sound is being played, one violation will be given. And per violation, one ticket will be deducted from them. The games of PBB Arcade: No. / Date given / Game title and description / Player(s) / Tickets earned / Total tickets; 1 / Nov. 23 (Day 39) / Soccer Arcade; The housemates must hit the target by kicking a soccer ball. They will earn 1 ticket per hit. One at a time, they must continuously kick the balls given to them; they are not allowed to let the balls gather at the kicking area. Also, the ball must not cross the yellow line. Every time they will violate the game rules, a violation will be given to them. Each of them are only allowed to play the game for five minutes. / Kyle / 17 tickets^{1} / 8 tickets; 1 / Nov. 23 (Day 39) / Soccer Arcade; The housemates must hit the target by kicking a soccer ball. They will earn 1 ticket per hit. One at a time, they must continuously kick the balls given to them; they are not allowed to let the balls gather at the kicking area. Also, the ball must not cross the yellow line. Every time they will violate the game rules, a violation will be given to them. Each of them are only allowed to play the game for five minutes. / Alexa / -18 tickets^{1} / 8 tickets; 1 / Nov. 23 (Day 39) / Soccer Arcade; The housemates must hit the target by kicking a soccer ball. They will earn 1 ticket per hit. One at a time, they must continuously kick the balls given to them; they are not allowed to let the balls gather at the kicking area. Also, the ball must not cross the yellow line. Every time they will violate the game rules, a violation will be given to them. Each of them are only allowed to play the game for five minutes. / KD / 9 tickets^{1} / 8 tickets; 2 / Nov. 23 (Day 39) / Soccer Arcade; The housemates must hit the target by kicking a soccer ball. They will earn 1 ticket per hit. One at a time, they must continuously kick the balls given to them; they are not allowed to let the balls gather at the kicking area. Also, the ball must not cross the yellow line. Every time they will violate the game rules, a violation will be given to them. Each of them are only allowed to play the game for five minutes. / Eian / -5 tickets^{2} / 39 tickets; 2 / Nov. 23 (Day 39) / Soccer Arcade; The housemates must hit the target by kicking a soccer ball. They will earn 1 ticket per hit. One at a time, they must continuously kick the balls given to them; they are not allowed to let the balls gather at the kicking area. Also, the ball must not cross the yellow line. Every time they will violate the game rules, a violation will be given to them. Each of them are only allowed to play the game for five minutes. / Jordan / 23 tickets^{2} / 39 tickets; 2 / Nov. 23 (Day 39) / Soccer Arcade; The housemates must hit the target by kicking a soccer ball. They will earn 1 ticket per hit. One at a time, they must continuously kick the balls given to them; they are not allowed to let the balls gather at the kicking area. Also, the ball must not cross the yellow line. Every time they will violate the game rules, a violation will be given to them. Each of them are only allowed to play the game for five minutes. / Shanaia / 13 tickets^{2} / 39 tickets; 2 / Nov. 23 (Day 39) / Soccer Arcade; The housemates must hit the target by kicking a soccer ball. They will earn 1 ticket per hit. One at a time, they must continuously kick the balls given to them; they are not allowed to let the balls gather at the kicking area. Also, the ball must not cross the yellow line. Every time they will violate the game rules, a violation will be given to them. Each of them are only allowed to play the game for five minutes. / Anji / 8 tickets^{2} / 39 tickets; 3 / Nov. 24 (Day 40) / Balloon Dart Game; While being blindfolded, a housemate must burst balloons using a dart spear. To guide the blindfolded housemate, four housemates will serve as human directional buttons (when they are being pressed, the human directional buttons will call out their designated direction). Another housemate will also serve as the operator of the human directional buttons; he or she will also be tasked to press the "go button" to signal the blindfolded housemate to burst a balloon by using a dart spear. They are only given 20 tries to finish this game. / All male housemates^{3} / 17 tickets / 17 tickets; 4 / Nov. 24 (Day 40) / / All female housemates^{4} / 17 tickets / 17 tickets; 5 / Nov. 25 (Day 41) / Soccer and Balloon Dart Arcade; For their last game, the game will be divided in two parts. For the first part, taking turns, each of them will have to kick a soccer ball to hit the designated target. If the target is hit, he or she will then have to proceed to the next part wherein he has to control and guide another housemate to burst a balloon using the same spear used in the second game. He will earn two tickets if he or she correctly bursts a red balloon, while two tickets will be deducted if he or she will burst a black balloon. They all have 30 minutes to play this game. At the start of the game, the housemates had already got 31 violations earned from the freeze task. This will be deducted in their total tickets earned from the five games played. / All housemates / 100 tickets / 69 tickets (31 tickets were already deducted); Total aggregate tickets / / / / / 150 tickets	Passed
7	December 3 (Day 49)	Reunited; Using their blocks, each team will need to meet halfway in the activity area using their blocks as pathways. After meeting at the center, all them must build a three layer platform that should be able to fit them all in it. They will not be reunited if cannot hold at the platform for 30 seconds, or finish the task for more than an hour. If they are successful with this task, the housemates will be reunited and they will be able to win their weekly budget.	Passed
8	December 6 (Day 52)^{5}	Sikat ang Sayaw ng Pinoy (Pinoy Dance is Famous); The housemates must be able to create a dance choreography to the tune of their edition's theme song "Sikat ang Pinoy." In their choreography, it must include dance steps from ballroom, hiphop and folkdance. Each housemate must also be able to contribute a dance step to their entire choreography. For their final performance, all of them will be required to wear headphones with one housemate being selected to wear a headphone that plays the distorted or off-tempo version of the song. Also, in the event they committed three mistakes in one round, they have three chances to perform the dance presentation all over again. To win this task, they must receive a total score of not less than 88% from the guest judges. The results of Sikat ang Sayaw ng Pinoy dance weekly task: Criteria / AC Bonifacio / Zeus Collins / Total Average; Choreography / 30% / 29% / 29.5%; Synchronization & Coordination / 20% / 25% / 22.5%; Overall Performance / 39% / 25% / 37%; Total Average Score / / / 89%	Passed
9	December 14 (Day 60)	Makuha Ka Sa Tingin (You Get to Look); With their cone-shaped masks on throughout the task, the housemates segregated into three groups must get the giant puzzle pieces from the garden and pool areas (for Baby Jesus) and within the activity area (for Mary and Joseph), and bring them to the activity area where they will build the rectangular puzzle of a character from the Nativity scene: Baby Jesus, Mary, and Joseph. If completed, not only the housemates will receive their weekly budget, they will give the amount of one hundred thousand Philippine pesos (PHP 100,000) for the Philippine Accessible Disability Services, Inc. (PADS), this season's second beneficiary. The outcome of Makuha Ka Sa Tingin weekly task: Character / Twist / Outcome; Baby Jesus / All housemates will solve the puzzle with their cone masks with a tiny hole at the cone's sharp tip. / Completed; Joseph / Only Madam Inutz, Alyssa, and Samantha will be wearing the same cone masks from earlier, while all other housemates will be wearing red-nosed cone masks obstructing the entrance of light. Therefore, making it more difficult to finish solving the puzzle. / Completed; Mary / All housemates will solve the puzzle with their red-nosed cone masks similar to what the other housemates wore in the Joseph puzzle. / Completed	Passed
10	December 22 (Day 68)	Andito Tayo Para Sa Isa't Isa (English: We Are Here For Each Other); The housemates will dress as reindeers to deliver a large Christmas gift. In the activity area, a 14-layered Christmas tree has to be stacked using green cups and a yellow cup (to evoke the star on the Christmas tree-top) on top of the cart, to which they will pull around the house-shaped route. To complete the challenge, they must turn around for a hundred times without letting the cups fall; otherwise, they must return and redo from the starting point. Once completed, they will be able to give one hundred thousand Philippine pesos (PHP 100,000) to the families and communities affected by Typhoon Odette.	Passed
Adults
1	January 1 (Day 78)	Secret Siblings Task; A day before the entry of the other adult housemates, Nathan and Raf were given their first weekly task. They must make sure that for the entire week, the others will not find out that they are siblings.	Passed
2	January 9 (Day 86)	Build a House; Three at a time, the housemates must build a six-feet house made by wall blocks using an improvised tools made by Aleck, Michael Ver, and Zach were isolated in the secret room. Meanwhile, the three isolated housemates must build the frame and roof of the house they built. The housemates must not use their hands to place the blocks—instead, they must use the tools provided by the three isolated housemates. To complete the task, the house must be completely stable within ten minutes. Once completed, the reward of a task is to re-build Gin's house that was devastated by Typhoon Odette.	Passed
3	January 18 (Day 95)	Pinoy Big Video Challenge; The housemates were tasked to create three videos that will be posted on the show's social media accounts the day after the shooting of their videos. The housemates must reach at least 10,000 Kumu Klips of their videos that must be re-enacted by the Kumunity through Kumu to win this task.^{1}	Failed
4	January 24 (Day 101)	The Big Online 10-dahan (The Big Online Store); The housemates were tasked to form an online startup company to buy and sell the products that they have made through a series of tasks. To win this task, they must earn a capital of a minimum of at least ₱75,000 and a maximum of ₱100,000 at the end of the week. The sales that they will earn at the end of this task will then be donated to the victims of Typhoon Odette. Note that the incumbent boss of the company must not participate on the capital tasks; only the board members and Glenda, the houseguest, can participate; and the boss of their company can be replaced once voted by a majority; the incumbent boss within the end of the weekly task will be given immunity for the first nominations. The bosses of their company during their weekly task: No. / Day elected / Elected boss / Votes given / Day removed; 1 / January 24 (Day 101) / Michael Ver / 14–3 (against Glenda) / January 28 (Day 105); 1 / January 24 (Day 101) / Michael Ver / 9–4–2–1–1 (against Roque, Glenda, Raf, and Nathan) / January 28 (Day 105); 2 / January 28 (Day 105) / Isabel / 7–5–3–1–1 (against Kathleen, Seham, Glenda, and Nathan) / January 29 (Day 106); 3 / January 29 (Day 106) / Kathleen^{2} / 8–4–2–2–1 (against Isabel, Michael, Glenda, and Aleck) / February 8 (Day 116); The capital tasks given on The Big Online 10-dahan weekly task: No. / Day given / Task / Participants / Maximum capital to be earned / Capital earned; 1 / January 26 (Day 103) / Vault of Balls; There are 1,000 black balls placed on a vault, which will be scattered on the floor once the door of the vault is twisted. Only three of the housemates will only get each ball using their hands. They are given 100 seconds to place all of the balls into the vault again. ₱20 will be added to the capital for every ball placed into the vault. / Glenda, Isabel, Raf / ₱20,000 / ₱12,660 (placed 633 balls); 2 / January 27 (Day 104) / Capital Tower of Blocks; The housemates must stack and balance the boxes that spell the word "capital" while getting 10 blue balls placed around the play area. A player will balance and get the balls, and two players will stack and balance the boxes. If the boxes fall down, they must balance the boxes again in order to get a ball. They are given 6 minutes to get all of the blue balls. ₱3,000 will be added to the capital for every blue ball taken. / Seham, Nathan, Isabel / ₱30,000 / ₱30,000 (got 10 blue balls); 3 / January 28 (Day 105) / The Elevated Pathway; The housemates must construct an elevated pathway using the tools provided by Big Brother and must start from the living area to the activity area; from there, the housemates must form four sides in order for the balls to rotate to the other side. An amount is assigned on every side, with the box on the center of the activity area being the highest. If the ball falls, they must begin on the living area again. ₱50,000 will be added to the capital once the ball lands on the center of the activity area. If not, the peak side of where the ball landed will be their final capital. / Gin, Seham, Laziz, Aleck, Michael Ver / ₱50,000 / ₱40,000 (peaked on the fourth side); Total capital earned / / / / / ₱82,660	Passed
5	February 7 (Day 115)^{3}	Love Sacrifice; In connection to the upcoming Valentine's Day celebration inside the House, the housemates were tasked to create enough paper flowers to fill the big broken heart found in the center of the activity area.^{4}	Passed
6	February 13 (Day 121)	PBB Drag Race; Similar to RuPaul's Drag Race, the housemates must dress, act, and perform like drag queens and must do a dancing and lip-syncing challenge. To accomplish this, both groups must get at least 90% of the average score from the judges and the Kumunity. ^{5} Teams: Roqueens: Roque (leader), Isabel, Jaye, Nathan, Seham, and Zach; Ginwin: Gin (leader), Basti, Kathleen, Laziz, Michael Ver, and Raf; The result of the PBB Drag Race task: Dawn Chang / Brigiding / Kumunity; 91% / 95% / 23.37%^{6}; Total Average Score / / 69.8%	Failed
7	February 23 (Day 131)	Endurance Challenge; The housemates were required to build ten wooden pillars at the height of a circular base. They should lay a circle cover on top of it. Aside from getting the budget, the housemates will also be reunited with the fake-evicted housemates.^{7}	Passed
8	March 2 (Day 138)	Stand Up; Both the housemates and houseplayers were required to stand for eight hours.	Passed
9	March 6 (Day 142)^{8}	Charity Task; Served as both a charity and a weekly task, five selected housemates must step on a color-coded part on the floor chosen by a digital roulette. They must use a paddle to pass a ball to another housemate to a container provided in the play area. One hundred pesos (₱100) will be added for every ball inserted in the container. They can shoot a maximum of 1,000 balls for this weekly task, possibly giving one hundred thousand pesos (₱100,000) if they shoot all of the balls to the chosen charity. All of the earnings that they will accumulate after the end of this weekly task will be donated to St. Arnold Janssen Kalinga Foundation, Inc., the fifth beneficiary Kumunity for this season.^{9}	Passed
Teens
1	March 14 (Day 150)	Star Hunt; While staying in the camp, all of the housemates in both groups must find ten stars that represent the first ten main seasons of the show in order to have a weekly budget and to successfully enter in the house through a series of tasks provided by Big Brother. The groups were given their own tasks for them to find out.^{1} Teams: Camp Masagana: Dustine, Eslam, Gabb, Maxine, and Rob; Camp Matiyaga: Ashton, Don, Kai, Luke, Stef, and Tiff; The tasks given: Task No. / Date given / Challenge task and description / Result; Camp Tasks: 1 / March 14 (Day 150) / Shooting Task; The team must gather 100 water balloons that are scattered on the play area. Then, they must hit 10 poles that are represented by the kinds of foods that they need to eat in the camp (e.g. fish, beef, and pork). The poles that they can take down after all of the water balloons have been used will only be the foods that they will eat. A star will be given for every five poles that they have taken down. / Passed (took down seven poles and gained one star); 2 / March 15 (Day 151) / Fishing Task; The team must undergo fishing on a pond located just beyond their camp. First, each member of the team must find three worms as their fish bait. Once completed, they can then find the five fishing rods scattered throughout the area. To succeed, the team must collect 10 fishes in a span of 10 minutes. A star will be given for every five fish caught. / Passed (caught 9 fishes and gained one star); 3 / March 16 (Day 152) / Find the Key; Both of the camps must unlock a box that has ten locks by finding its keys that are hanging in the various trees found in the forest. Each key is represented with an emoji that corresponds to a pre-determined sequence of keys. Each camp must find the correct emoji to find the correct key to successfully unlock a lock. One housemate must be assigned as a spotter from each camp to find the correct bag of keys by using binoculars. A star will be given for every five locks that they unlock. Both of the camps were given 30 minutes to complete the task. / Passed (gained two stars); 4 / March 18 (Day 154) / Both of the groups must undergo an obstacle course while carrying a housemate that will remove the three sacks that are hanging on a pole that contains the puzzle pieces that they must assemble in the center of the course. Once the three sacks have been removed, the group can then start assembling the puzzle pieces that resembles the show's eye logo. They were given 100 minutes to complete the task—the unused time by the first group will be used by the second group. Once completed, the housemates will be given three stars. / Passed (gained three stars and was completed by Camp Matiyaga); Joint Tasks: 5 / March 19 (Day 155) / All of the housemates must line up and must hold a balloon on their chests while walking on a star-shaped pathway. The first housemate in line must balance a ball using a balancing device. The housemates must place three balls in three poles once they reach to the center of the star. If the ball or the balloon falls, they must start again from the beginning. Every ball placed in a pole is equal to one star. The housemates must complete this in 30 minutes. If they complete this task, they will earn their weekly budget and will earn three stars; otherwise, if they fail this, they will lose their weekly budget. / Failed (only placed two balls and gained two stars)	Failed
2	March 21 (Day 157)	Basketball Dance; The housemates must create a basketball choreography wherein they will perform a dance and use a basketball at the same time. They are required to perform five basketball tricks on their final performance. They are only allowed to make three mistakes.^{2,} ^{3}	Failed
3	March 29 (Day 165)	Body Photo Mosaic Making; The housemates must successfully mimic an image through a photo mosaic with 324 pieces of different photographs. That is, when the photos they are taking are set aside, can be successfully seen and correct. They can use any parts of their body to put and color them to help with the image that needs to be formed.^{4}	Passed
4	April 4 (Day 171)	PBB University; Served as both a weekly task and a group challenge, the housemates were divided into two groups for the week. They must compete with each other through tasks or "examinations" on different subjects that are taught at schools such as Language and Science to get the materials needed for their weekly task. Meanwhile, for their weekly task, both groups must successfully create a boat made from different sizes of water bottles. Their boats must not sink and must hold multiple people when tested. If both groups are successful, they will be given their weekly budget, otherwise, if only one of the groups succeed, they will be given half of the budget, or none if both of the groups failed to successfully create a boat. See Group challenges for more information. Teams: Team Dustine: Dustine (leader), Kai, Paolo, Rob, Stef, and Stephanie; Team Luke: Luke (leader), Ashton, Eslam, Gabb, Maxine, and Tiff	Passed
5	April 10 (Day 177)	Tree of Sacrifice; Using the big rocks that they have written earlier in the morning, the housemates must carry all of their rocks altogether on a tree for the entire week for a specified amount of time provided by Big Brother. They are only allowed to make three attempts to lower the tree for the entire duration of this task.^{5}	Passed
6	April 18 (Day 185)	Past is Past; As a response to the widely criticized History Quiz Bee, the housemates were divided into two groups that was determined through its counterpart as a Head of Household challenge, the housemates in both groups must earn a "passing grade" of 15 out of 20 correct answers from two examinations; a surprise "midterm" and "final" examination that will be given by Big Brother during the entire duration of the weekly task. Teams: Tour Group: Tiff (leader), Dustine, Gabb, Luke, and Maxine; Museum Group: Eslam (leader), Ashton, Paolo, Rob, and Stephanie; The tasks given on Past is Past: Task No. / Date given / Challenge task and description / Result; 1 / April 18 (Day 185) / Live Human Diorama; The Museum Group were tasked by Big Brother to create five live human dioramas in the living area (and in the pool area for the fifth diorama) and must re-enact the events that Big Brother will give to them for the other group (Tour Group) to see. While doing the task, a voiceover by Robi about the details regarding the diorama portrayed by the Museum Group will be heard around the house for the groups to learn. They are not allowed to move or communicate with the other group while doing the task. The result of Live Human Diorama task: Task No. / Date given / Event to imitate / Result; 1 / April 18 (Day 185) / Battle of Mactan / Passed; 2 / April 18 (Day 185) / Bataan Death March / Passed; 3 / April 19 (Day 186) / Family photo of Paolo and JC Alcantara / Passed; 4 / April 22 (Day 189) / Austronesians / Passed; 5 / April 22 (Day 189) / Miss Universe 2015 coronation / Passed / Passed; 2 / April 21 (Day 188) / Surprise Midterm Examination; The Tour Group embarked on an outside world journey to Ayala Museum as a reward for earning the most points during their History Picture Quiz Bee challenge with the help of Mr. Ambeth R. Ocampo, a renowned Filipino public historian. The two teams will work together to fill in the ten blank exhibits displayed in Museo ni Kuya. The Museum Group must read the description of each exhibit and the Tour Group must find the correct artifact that can be found throughout Ayala Museum and must take a picture of it to confirm their answer by sending it through an online messaging application. They only have 20 minutes to complete this task. The points that they will gather at the end of this midterm examination will be added to their final score in their final examination. The result of their surprise midterm exam: No. / Clue (translated from Filipino) / Artifact / Result; 1 / It is a stylized human figure made of wood commonly seen in front of Ifugao houses in the 17th century. / Bulul / Correct; 2 / Jar burials have been one of the burial practices of the past 7,000-2,500 years. These jars like the Manunggul Jar were discovered in this cave. / Not revealed / Wrong; 3 / He was a general who commanded the Armed Forces of the Philippine Revolution. He was strict in training and disciplined so he was known as the best Filipino general of his time. He was killed on June 5, 1899, by the Kawit Battalion. / Assassination of General Antonio Luna / Correct; 4 / It was worn to show the status symbol of men in Bontoc in the 20th century. It is an ornament made of mother-of-pearl shell, string, and metal. / Fikum buckle / Correct; 5 / This national hero was shot on December 30, 1896, in Bagumbayan now better known as Rizal Park. / The execution of Jose Rizal / Correct; 6 / Also called Mickey Mouse Money, these Philippine currencies in 1944 during World War II represented the victory over foreign invasion. / Assorted Japanese invasion money / Correct; 7 / For the first time on March 31, 1521, a celebration took place to spread Roman Catholicism. This celebration was led by Father Pedro de Valderrama. / The First Mass / Correct; 8 / This is a common practice of Southeast Asians to clean the skull of the remains of their loved ones. These bones were then placed in this container. / Secondary burial jar with cover / Correct; 9 / These images of saints were made in the 19th century. Ivory, gold, silver, wood, and other precious stones are their materials. Some of them also used real human hair. / Nuestra Señora del Rosario / Correct; 10 / No clue as their time has run out; Final score / / / 8 / Passed (earned 8 out of 10 correct answers); 3 / April 22 (Day 189) / Final Examination; With the special and only participation of the Museum Group, there are 30 pictures that are hanging in the activity area—they have to identify the right photographs from the distracting ones that are not the same as the original photograph provided to them. They have to select 10 pictures of the events that they have studied all week from Museo ni Kuya, from the Live Human Diorama task, and from the Ayala Museum. The three of them must pull the chariot or kalesa as horses while two of them are on board getting the right pictures. Once complete, they must arrange the 10 photos in chronological order (from the beginning up to the present). They must get seven or more correct answers to succeed in their weekly task. The result of their final examination: Place No. (in chronological order) / Artifact with date / Housemates' placement / Result; 1 / Austronesian period (5,000-7,000 B.C.) / 1st / Correct; 2 / Magellan's arrival in the Philippines (Mar. 16, 1521) / 2nd / Correct; 3 / First Mass in the Philippines (Mar. 31, 1521) / 3rd / Correct; 4 / Battle of Mactan (Apr. 27, 1521) / 4th / Correct; 5 / Cry of Pugad Lawin (Aug. 23, 1896) / 6th / Wrong; 6 / The execution of Dr. Jose Rizal (Dec. 30, 1896) / 5th / Wrong; 7 / Assassination of General Antonio Luna (June 5, 1899) / 7th / Correct; 8 / Bataan Death March (Apr. 9–17, 1942) / 8th / Correct; 9 / Miss Universe 2015 coronation (Dec. 20, 2015) / 9th / Correct; 10 / Family photo of Paolo and JC Alcantara (circa 2016) / 10th / Correct; Final score / / / 8 / Passed (earned 8 out of 10 correct answers); Grand total / / / 16	Passed
7	April 24 (Day 191)	The Big KumuniTEEN Summer Concert; The housemates must create a summer-themed concert throughout the week. They must create five performances on the said concert and must use the musical instruments provided by Big Brother. P-pop groups SB19 and MNL48 will serve as their mentors in singing and dancing respectively for this weekly task. The concert will be judged alone by the Kumunity; this consists of a panel of 50 people selected by the management between April 25 to 27. To pass, the housemates must reach at least 250 diamonds or more at the end of all 6 performances in order to succeed in this weekly task and to give ₱100,000 to Bantay Bata: Children's Village, the seventh Kumunity beneficiary for this season. Concert score tally Performance No.: 1 / 2 / 3 / 4 / 5 / 6; 50 / 39 / 31 / 45 / 49 / 50; Final total number of diamonds / / / 264; Performance list: Performance No. / Song / Original artist/s / To be performed by; 1 / Kabataang Pinoy (remix version) / SB19 and BINI / All housemates; 2 / Dahil Sa'yo / Iñigo Pascual / Dustine, Eslam, Luke, Paolo, and Rob; 3 / Mabagal / Daniel Padilla and Moira Dela Torre / Luke and Gabb; 4 / No Way Man / MNL48 (original ver. by AKB48) / Gabb, Maxine, Stephanie, and Tiff (with MNL48); 5 / Bahaghari / Dustine, Eslam, Rob, Stephanie, and Tiff (original composition); 6 / Mapa / SB19 / Dustine, Eslam, Rob, Stephanie, and Tiff (with SB19); — / Bazinga / Guest performance by SB19; Tasks given on the Big KumuniTEEN Summer Concert: No. / Date given / Challenge title and description / Result; 1 / April 25 (Day 192) / The Big KumuniTEEN Concert Auditions; The auditions for the concert was held live on Kumu to determine the leader for this weekly task. All housemates will audition on the Kumu Room and the Kumunity can drop virtual gifts to a housemate of their choice during 10-minute audition windows of every housemate. Virtual gifts sent after each 10-minute window will not be counted. As an added twist, they were distracted by a furry mascot in unexpected times during the duration of their respective auditions. The housemate with the most number of virtual gifts sent by the Kumunity at the end of the auditions will become the leader for the weekly task. NOTE: The listing is based on the chronological order of their respective auditions during the Kumu live stream. The result of the auditions: No. / Housemate / Talent / Diamonds received / Result; 1 / Maxine / Freestyle dancing / 62,600 / Not selected; 2 / Dustine / Poetry and a cappella singing / 12,700 / Not selected; 3 / Tiff / Singing and guitar playing / 45,300 / Not selected; 4 / Eslam / Singing and piano playing / 16,700 / Not selected; 5 / Stephanie / Singing and guitar playing / 386,900 / Not selected; 6 / Paolo / Singing and dancing / 417,600 / Selected (Weekly Task Leader); 7 / Rob / Singing / 74,400 / Not selected; 8 / Gabb / Singing and dancing / 31,700 / Not selected (Co-Task Leader); 9 / Luke / Singing / 72,200 / Not selected; In addition, Paolo was tasked by Big Brother to select a co-task leader for the weekly task; he chose Gabb. / N/A; 2 / April 25 (Day 192) / Selected housemates must try to lift a specified number of musical notes on a wide rectangular-shaped piano platform into a specified height set by Big Brother in order to get musical instruments for their concert. There are four rounds for this task: in each succeeding round, the number of musical notes that they need to lift will be added by 5; a maximum of 20 musical notes for four musical instruments. Four housemates will be assigned as lifters, while the remaining will become the lookout. As an added twist on the third and fourth rounds, the lifters were required to wear blindfolds and were distracted by different sounds while lifting the platform. The housemates must not make the musical notes fall down while lifting—otherwise, they must start from the beginning. They only have 30 minutes to complete this challenge. Selected housemates: Dustine, Luke, Maxine, Stephanie, and Tiff The result of their challenge: Round No. / No. of musical notes needed to lift / No. of musical instruments to be awarded / Result; 1 / 5 / 1 / Correct; 2 / 10 / 2 / Correct; 3 / 15 / 3 / Correct; 4 / 20 / 4 / Time ran out / Passed^{6} (gained three musical instruments); 3 / April 26 (Day 193) / Target Shooting Task; Selected housemates must shoot the 10 targets away from a distance using a toy gun to form a puzzle that displays the reward that they will get after the challenge: the stage needed for their concert. Once a specific target is shot, the accompanied puzzle piece will slide down, revealing the puzzle. They only have 10 rounds to complete this task. When completed, not only will the housemates receive the stage needed for their concert, Maxine, who is celebrating her birthday at that time, will also receive a cake and a video call from her parents. Selected housemates: Eslam, Gabb, Maxine, Paolo, and Rob / Failed^{7} (shot 3 out of 10 targets); 4 / April 28 (Day 195) / Human Sinulid (English: Human Thread); The housemates, including a member of SB19 (Ken) must need to get through the "needle holes" that they must pass through from the living area to the activity area. They can do this as they move their bodies and lying on the floor while being connected at each other. They must pass through all 9 "holes" to get 9 costumes for the said concert. They must start from the beginning if the human thread is cut. The task will begin with two people and one person will be added to the human thread for each hole passed. They only have an hour to complete this task. / Passed^{8} (got all 9 costumes)	Passed
8	May 5 (Day 202)^{9}	Plate Balancing Task; The housemates must balance two hundred plates that must be individually placed in five tables consisting of forty thin poles. All of the plates must not fall throughout the duration of the task and must stay put until the time runs out. They were only given 100 minutes to complete this task.	Failed
9	May 13 (Day 210)	Paper Tower of Tibay (Paper Tower of Strength); The housemates must build a tower made out of paper in the activity area. They must make sure that the tower that they built must be at least 7-feet tall and sturdy while three diamonds are placed on top of their tower within 100 seconds. The outcome of this weekly task will be the basis of the donation Big Brother will give to Sinag Kalinga Foundation, Inc., the eighth Kumunity beneficiary for this season.	Passed
Biga-10
1	May 18 (Day 215)^{1}	Baliktad-Bahay (Reversed House); The housemates must try to stack seventy-two pieces of colored blocks in the pool area. They must stack those blocks in reverse so that the blocks can be seen correctly as a reflection of the house can be seen in the bottom of the pool as their guide. One thousand pesos (₱1,000) will be added to the total donation to Science of Identity Foundation, Inc., the season's ninth Kumunity beneficiary for every block placed; or one hundred thousand pesos (₱100,000) if all seventy-two blocks are placed at the end of the weekly task.	Failed
2	May 22 (Day 219)^{2}	Stacking Colored Tower Cups; The housemates must build four colored tower cups that represents the color of their respective Kumunity. They must build their respective colored tower cups and must work altogether on a fourth tower. Two Kumunities must work their tower at a time assigned by Big Brother at a location that was picked by the task leaders. The outcome of this weekly task will become the basis of the donation Big Brother will give to Feed Hungry Minds Library, Inc., the tenth and final Kumunity beneficiary of the season.	Passed

Notes

Celebrities

1. A total of 21 game violations were earned during Kyle's turn to play the game. He was able to get 38 hits which gave him to earn a total of 17 tickets. For Alexa, she earned 22 hits while incurring 40 game violations. This gave her -18 tickets. KD, on the other hand, was able to make 33 hits while earning 24 game violations. He earned a total of 9 tickets. For the first round of the Soccer Arcade, all in all, they earned eight tickets.
2. For the second round of the Soccer Arcade, Eian was able to make a total of -5 tickets from the 18 hits and the 23 game violations he had earned. For Jordan, he earned 27 hits while incurring only four game violations. This gave him 23 tickets. Shanaia, on the other hand, was able to make 22 hits while earning 9 game violations. She earned a total of 13 tickets. For the last game for this round, Anji was able to make 22 hits while earning 14 game violations; she earned a total of eight tickets. All in all, they earned 39 tickets.
3. Kyle was selected not to participate since all the positions in the game were already filled.
4. Shanaia was selected not to participate since all the positions in the game were already filled.
5. Benedix and Shanaia were in the house when the task was performed. The episode for this task was aired on December 12, 2021. The celebrity housemates received the total average score of 89% from the judges.

Adults

1. The adult housemates were informed by Big Brother that the result of this weekly task will be displayed on the plasma TV; if the face of Karlito, the tarsier mascot of Kumu, is happy, signifies success; if sad, signifies failure. After revealing the result by revealing each part of the picture, a sad Karlito was shown, meaning that they have failed this weekly task.
2. Kathleen was elected as the last boss of their company the day after completing their third capital task; thus making her safe from the nominations. This was in connection to their secret weekly task given to them on Day 101, making Andrei and Roque the first two nominees of the first nominations.
3. Aleck and Rica were in the house when the task was performed. The episode for this task was aired on February 13, 2022.
4. To determine the result of their weekly budget, they were given an hour to insert all of the flowers they have created and earned during the task given to Aleck, Basti, Kathleen, and Rica; they have successfully placed all of the flowers in the big broken heart in one hour, therefore giving them their weekly budget.
5. Basti and Jaye were in the house when the task was performed. The episode for this task was aired on February 19, 2022.
6. To get the average score of 90%, the Kumunity must drop at least 840,000 diamonds on Kumu to get 84% of their total score. Every 10,000 diamonds dropped is equivalent to 1% of their score. In total, the Kumunity had only dropped 233,700 diamonds.
7. Gin, Isabel, Kathleen, Roque, and Zach helped the other housemates' as another paramdam (feeling) in their weekly task. Since they have successfully transferred the pillars, they were given their weekly budget and were reunited with the other five housemates.
8. Raf and Laziz along with the houseplayers Marky and Ja were in the house when the task was performed. The episode for this task was aired on March 7, 2022, one day after the fifth eviction night.
9. At the end of the weekly task, the housemates have successfully transferred 940 balls; this was equivalent to ₱94,000. All of the proceeds will be donated to St. Arnold Janssen Kalinga Foundation, Inc., the said Kumunity beneficiary for the weekly task.

Teens

1. The teen housemates have only collected nine stars at the end of the weekly task. Therefore, they have failed and were not given their weekly budget.
2. As suggested by Big Brother himself, Don was exempt from performing due to his health condition.
3. The housemates made four mistakes while performing the weekly task. They were made by Rob and Tiff with one mistake each, and Maxine with two mistakes; therefore, they were not given their weekly budget again.
4. The housemates only received 50% of their weekly budget for the week as the task leaders, Dustine and Maxine, traded the other 50% for an extra advantage on the last 15 minutes of their weekly task as said by Big Brother.
5. Kai was in the house when the task was performed. The episode for this task was aired on April 11, 2022, one day after the second eviction night.
6. As punishment, the housemates must construct the remaining unclaimed musical instrument by themselves.
7. Maxine still received her reward even though the housemates failed to shoot the seven remaining targets required to complete the task. The housemates would have to construct and paint the stage by themselves as another punishment for failing the challenge.
8. As task leader, Paolo was excluded for this challenge to act as their lookout for the challenge along with the other members of SB19.
9. This weekly task must be completed by the housemates in 24 hours after the housemates voted for "a weekly task valid for a day" in the voting asked by Big Brother.

Biga-10

1. Even though the housemates failed in this weekly task, the housemates managed to place 30 blocks at the end of the weekly task; therefore giving thirty-thousand pesos (₱30,000) to Science of Identity Foundation, Inc.
2. Anji was suggested by Big Brother to not participate in this weekly task due to her lower back pain.

=== Other tasks ===
Task No.	Date given	Type	Task title and description	Participants	Result
Celebrities
1	October 16 (Day 1)	Reward task	Shopping Task; The housemates were informed that the ambag bags they brought with them contained Big coins, and these coins were the equivalent of the diamonds they have earned from the live stream tasks done via Kumu. Each 10,000 diamonds earned is equivalent to one Big coin. Later, they were instructed to place all their coins into the glass container found in the living area; in total they have earned 61.9 million diamonds which is equivalent 6,190 coins. At the activity area, the housemates were grouped into three based on the choronological order of their introductions, and were tasked to shop the furniture and all the other items they need to use inside the House using the coins they have earned. Each group were only given 100 seconds to shop. Each group must select an envelope which will determine the kind of "human container" they had to use for the task. The outcome of the Shopping Task: Group No. / Members / Human container used / Amount spent; Beginning balance / / / 6,190 Big coins; 1 / Madam Inutz, Brenda, & TJ / Shopping cart / 2,300 Big coins; 2 / Anji, KD, & Shanaia / Human eco bag / 875 Big coins; 3 / Samantha, Eian, & Alexa / Human shopping basket / 1,875 Big coins; 4 / John, Alyssa, & Karen / Human eco bag / 675 Big coins; Total Big coins spent / / / 5,675 Big coins; Ending balance / / / 515 Big coins^{1}	All housemates	Passed
2	October 17 (Day 2)	Kumunity Decides	Kumunity Pantry; Similar to the community pantry concept that was greatly applied by many communities across the country during the pandemic, Alyssa was tasked to get the housemates' food supplies. She was only allowed to get enough food supplies that could feed all of the 12 housemates that day. She was allowed to get some help—she chose Anji. As a surprise, Alyssa and Anji were also tasked to cook all their meals for that day. Unknown to Alyssa, this task was chosen by Kumu users via Kumunity Decides.	Alyssa and Anji	Passed
3	October 25 (Day 18)	Punishment task	Due to their high number of violations while in the house, Big Brother kicked out the celebrity housemates in the house and were tasked to stay in a prison cell-like room in the activity area until the time given by Big Brother.	All housemates	Passed
4	October 25 (Day 18)	Punishment task	The female housemates (excluding Alexa) were told to create a total of 250 small wooden blocks as preparation for their next weekly task.	All female housemates	Passed
5	October 25 (Day 18)	Punishment task	In order to for the celebrity housemates to leave the jail-like room, they are told to pass one object from one housemate to another for 10 minutes while also saying their promise to not repeat the violation that they have created (e.g. I will not [name of violation committed]).	All housemates	Passed
6	October 25 (Day 18)	Secret task	Newcomer housemate Benedix was told to be the main officer of the prison cell-like room while keeping his housemate status a secret while the current housemates are staying and facing their respective punishments.	Benedix	Passed
7	November 3 (Day 19)	Secret reward task	Tumba Table Practice; John was tasked to gather four housemates to practice the tumba table weekly task. Within two hours, the five of them (including John) must be able to make 35 wooden blocks to stand on the hanging unstable table. Unknown to John, the reward for this task is a recorded video from his live-in partner (his fiancée) and their child.	John	Passed
8	November 8 (Day 24)	Secret reward task	Alyssa was tasked to make a surprise virtual birthday dinner for Samantha and her mom. She was also tasked to cook Samantha's favorite dishes without her knowing anything.	Alyssa	Passed
9	November 9 (Day 25)	Secret reward task	Brenda was tasked to act as an English teacher. Successfully finishing this task will give Alexa a graduation pictorial, which will be done inside the House.	Brenda	Passed
10	November 18 (Day 34)	Secret task	Kumu-sikahan Jamming Night; Alyssa, Alexa, Anji, KD and Samantha were tasked to prepare a live music jam streaming and earn 500,000 Kumu diamonds for Madam Inutz's pre-birthday celebration; if they decided to have a birthday drink, they must need to earn 1 million diamonds to get the said drinks. KD was given a special task to compose a song for Madam Inutz for which the both of them must sing in the live stream.	Alyssa, Alexa, Anji, KD, and Samantha	Passed
11	November 19 (Day 35)	Secret reward task	Madam Inutz must dress and act as Alexa's mother without Alexa knowing. If successful, Alexa will be able to have a video call with her mother.	Madam Inutz	Passed
12	November 22 (Day 38)	Secret task	Wearing costumes as if they are human-sized toys, Alyssa, Benedix, Eian, Karen, KD, Shanaia, and TJ were tasked to not move when Brenda is around with them. If any of them will move, or if Brenda somehow gets any hint about their task, all of them will receive a violation. They may only be allowed to move when Big Brother sounds the signal. Meanwhile, Samantha, who is acting as a fairy godmother in the House, may be allowed to move and act as their lookout.	Alyssa, Benedix, Eian, Karen, KD, Samantha, Shanaia, and TJ	Failed
13	November 23 (Day 39)	Reward task	First Golden Ticket; For finishing their first PBB Arcade game, Kyle was tasked to give KD the golden ticket they have earned. The ticket will allow KD to see a recorded message from his dad.	Kyle	Passed
14	November 24 (Day 40)	Reward task	Second Golden Ticket; For finishing their second PBB Arcade game, the male housemates except Brenda were given the chance to give one of them the time for a friendly date with a female housemate. They unanimously decided to give the second golden ticket to KD, allowing him and Anji to have a carnival date in the arcade.	Benedix, Eian, Jordan, KD, Kyle and TJ	Passed
15	December 6 (Day 52)	Reward task	Real or Fake; Chosen by Kumu users through Kumunity Decides, Eian was tasked to deliver eight news from the outside world to the housemates by streaming from the task room. The other housemates must then guess if those news reports were real or fake. If the housemates were able to guess at least five correct news reports, Eian will earn a special reward (a news about the health condition of his father). The outcome of Real or Fake task: No. / Headlines (translated from Filipino) / Response / Outcome; 1 / Face-to-face classes have begun in the Philippines. / Real / Wrong; 2 / Sharon Cuneta is also included in FPJ's Ang Probinsyano. / Real / Correct; 3 / The first tourists have already flown to Mars. / Fake / Correct; 4 / Janella Salvador will portray as "Valentina," the villain in Darna. / Fake / Wrong; 5 / Queen Elizabeth II has passed the crown to Prince Charles. / Fake / Correct; 6 / Theaters are still closed today. / Fake / Correct; 7 / Bright Orange is the Color of the Year for 2022. / Real / Wrong; 8 / Wearing of face shield is not mandatory in Metro Manila. / Real / Correct	Eian	Passed
16	December 6 (Days 52)	Reward task	Wire Maze Task; With the exception of Eian, the housemates must finish a metal loop of electric wire maze. The metal loop must not touch any part of the electric maze; and if ever such loop touches it, such housemate will need to go back from the start. The first five housemates to finish this task will be able to earn a message from their loved ones. In addition, the housemates were given a chance to give one housemate who didn't win in the game, which they chose Madam Inutz to earn a message from her mother who is bedridden.	Benedix, Shanaia, Jordan, and Brenda	Passed
16	December 6 (Days 52)	Reward task		Alexa, Alyssa, Anji, KD, Madam Inutz, and Samantha	Failed
17	December 14 (Day 60)	Special task	Madam Inutz and Alyssa must roam around the swimming pool for ten times while using crutches before getting their food supply from the Kumunity Pantry, where the housemates got their answers correctly in their game of charades. Completion of this special task will give Madam Inutz and Alyssa the opportunity to give beneficiary Verniel Faustrilla with arm crutches and a sports wheelchair.	Madam Inutz and Alyssa	Passed
Adults
Pre-House Tasks
1	January 2 (Day 79)	Reward task	Airplane Balancing Task; The housemates must line up and balance the plane's wing provided in the activity area for ten seconds. If the plane's wing is unbalanced, they must start again from the beginning. Once completed, all of the housemates will finally enter PBB Airlines.	All housemates	Passed
2	January 3 (Day 80)	Reward task	Turbulence; Just like riding an actual airplane, the housemates may experience turbulence at unexpected times while riding in PBB Airlines. This is represented by a turbulence sound that will be played by Big Brother. Instructed by the Final Five of the Celebrity Kumunity, Nathan or Captain Policarpio must shake a pair of two inter-connected bottles that are filled with marbles and must transfer it to the other side of the bottle by shaking it. On the other hand, the other housemates, including Raf, must wiggle their respective airplane helmets during the duration of the turbulence. They must do this until Nathan successfully transfers the marbles to the other side.	All housemates	Passed
3	January 4 (Day 81)	Special task	Babylandia Airport; For their first stop, the housemates had to layover to Babylandia Airport. From there, the housemates were greeted with garlands that has their baby pictures of them. They must wear their respective garlands and explain them to the housemates before they could finally ride again in PBB Airlines.	All housemates	Passed
4	January 5 (Day 82)	Reward task	Baggage Task; In order to gain access into the house, the housemates have to finish first an obstacle course while lined up altogether and must stack two boxes between them. They would have to start again if any of the boxes fall in the obstacle course. The housemates can then claim their baggages and finally enter the house altogether once they reach the finish line while keeping the boxes between them.	All housemates	Passed
House Tasks
5	January 7 (Day 84)	Secret reward task	Chosen by Kumu users through Kumunity Decides, Isabel was tasked to determine the two housemates that are hiding their real identity from each other. She chose Seham as her help in this task. At the end of the week, she chose Raf and Aleck, which in turn, have no relationship with each other. Nathan, on the other hand, revealed their secret weekly task and his real name afterwards. The reward for this secret task was never revealed as both Isabel and Seham failed in this task.	Isabel and Seham	Failed
6	January 12 (Day 89)	Reward task	Using their hips as their clues for their answers, the adult housemates must guess four correct answers each on the quizzes given by the three isolated housemates (Zach, Aleck, and Michael Ver). Successfully answering 10 or more of this quiz will reward them with extra materials for their second weekly task. The outcome of this reward task: No. / Question (translated from Filipino) / Response / Actual Answer / Outcome; For Zach: 1 / On what year did Zach move in to their house? / 2016 / 2016 / Correct; 2 / What is the color of the roof of Zach's house? / Green / Grey / Wrong; 3 / How many of Zach's siblings are left at his home? / 2 / 2 / Correct; 4 / What is the name of their dog in the photo? / Dutch / Gary / Wrong; For Aleck: 1 / What is the color of Aleck's gate? / Black / Black / Correct; 2 / What item did Aleck buy during the lockdown that was placed on the outside of their house? / Swimming pool / Swimming pool / Correct; 3 / What is the name of the thing Aleck parked on the front of the black gate? / Motorcycle / Motorcycle / Correct; 4 / On what day of the week does Aleck's family reunite at his home? / Sunday / Sunday / Correct; For Michael Ver: 1 / How old was Michael Ver when he lived in the house shown in the picture? / 6 / 6 / Correct; 2 / What are the many things that are outside Michael Ver's house that his mother also sells it? / Plants / Plants / Correct; 3 / How many family members does Michael Ver have in his house? / 10 / 10 / Correct; 4 / From where does Michael Ver live? / Isabel, Leyte / Isabel, Leyte / Correct	All housemates	Passed
7	January 18 (Day 95)	Special task	Big Brother's Supervisor; In preparation for the arrival of three other adult housemates, the current adult housemates must audition for the role of Big Brother's Supervisor. For the first part of the auditions, each of the housemates had two minutes to introduce themselves and say that why they must be picked as Big Brother's Supervisor. At the end of the first auditions, they chose Zach, Raf, Isabel, and Michael Ver as the four contenders for Big Brother's Supervisor. For the second and final auditions, each of the four contenders must lend their voices once again and must assign special tasks to their co-housemates to the confession room. Then, they must select one housemate that they wish to assign as Big Brother's Supervisor. In the end of the final auditions, decided through a game of rock paper scissors between Zach and Raf, Zach was officially assigned as Big Brother's Supervisor. Tasks given by the contenders: No. / Task (translated from Filipino) / Assigned by / Assigned to / Ref.; 1 / Seham must show her modeling skills by getting the bananas from the kitchen area and must hold it while striking a pose for two to three seconds in each of the four corners of the pool. / Isabel / Seham; 2 / Gin must get Raf's skirt in the girls' bedroom and must wash it in the garden area while singing. / Raf / Gin; 3 / Thamara must walk like a model while watering the plants (excluding the plants with white burns). / Zach / Thamara; 4 / Nathan must "fight" Laziz in the garden area using only his hand and foot for twenty seconds. / Michael Ver / Nathan	All housemates	Passed
8	January 19 (Day 96)	Secret task	After isolating from the housemates, Michael Ver and Aleck must sneak into the house secretly and arrange their respective beds without the housemates noticing them. If they are caught, the both of them will have to sleep on the floor.	Michael Ver, Aleck	Passed
9	January 20 (Day 97)	Special task	As Big Brother's Supervisor, Zach was given a big microphone by Big Brother to talk to the three newly entered housemates Jaye, Basti, and Rica. In order for the microphone to turn on, the housemates must form a human "cord" first and must insert the end of the cord on an on-air sign.	Zach	Passed
10	January 21 (Day 98)	Secret task	Chosen by Kumu users through Kumunity Decides, Isabel and Thamara must teach the dance steps that they have created and danced during their flight on PBB Airlines to the three new housemates (Basti, Jaye, and Rica) in connection to the third video for their third weekly task that were made by the new housemates. The two must not see the three new housemates while practicing, and the Supervisor (Zach) must not know that they are doing this task. If considered successful, the three new housemates will finally enter the house.	Isabel, Thamara	Passed
11	January 22 (Day 99)	Special task	The last three adult housemates that were the winners of Online Bahay ni Kuya (Andrei, Kathleen, and Roque), including houseguest Glenda, must step on a pathway of eight pairs of "rocks". Every rock signifies if they can proceed to another rock (represented by a ding sound), or a consequence if not. They can only land on a rock once the plasma TV displays "proceed". A buzzer sound will be played if the last three housemates and Glenda stepped on a wrong rock, and will be given a consequence to all of them (including the housemates that are inside the House). The consequence given will be displayed on the plasma TV in order for them to proceed and will be provided by a ninja. If considered successful, the last three housemates, including Glenda, will officially enter the house. Consequences given: No. / Step given / Consequence (translated from Filipino); 1 / 2nd / All of them must drink a raw egg from a shot glass. Selected housemates: Isabel, Seham, Michael Ver, and Thamara; 2 / 3rd / All of them must drink an ampalaya shake. Selected housemates: Nathan, Raf, Gin, and Aleck; 3 / 5th / All of them must eat a sliced eye of a cow. Selected housemates: Jaye, Basti, Rica, and Zach; 4 / 6th / Andrei, Kathleen, Roque, and Glenda must crawl on a muddy rope course.; 4 / 6th / Selected housemates that are inside the house must be showered with mud. Selected housemates: Jaye, Laziz, Gin, and Thamara; 5 / 8th / Andrei, Kathleen, Roque, Glenda, and selected housemates that are inside the house must blow a bowl of flour to find a key and must get it using only their mouths. Selected housemates: Nathan, Rica, Aleck, and Michael Ver	All housemates and Glenda	Passed
12	January 23 (Day 100)	Special task	Laziz must teach his native culture to all of the housemates by rapping in Russian with the help of his fellow male housemates (excluding Roque and Andrei).	Laziz	Passed
13	January 24 (Day 101)	Secret task	In connection to their fourth weekly task, the winners of Online Bahay ni Kuya on Kumu, Andrei, Kathleen, and Roque were informed separately that they must be assigned as the boss of their company during the duration of the weekly task. Failing this secret task will give them an automatic nomination for the first nominations.	Kathleen	Passed
13	January 24 (Day 101)	Secret task	In connection to their fourth weekly task, the winners of Online Bahay ni Kuya on Kumu, Andrei, Kathleen, and Roque were informed separately that they must be assigned as the boss of their company during the duration of the weekly task. Failing this secret task will give them an automatic nomination for the first nominations.	Andrei and Roque	Failed
14	January 24 (Day 101)	Special secret task	Houseguest Glenda was tasked to convince a housemate of her choice to become the boss of their company. The housemates must not know that she is doing this task, and Glenda must not be elected as the boss of their company, as she is only a houseguest, and not an official housemate. Glenda's choice was Michael Ver; as a result, Michael Ver was elected as the first boss of the company; making her special secret task a success.	Glenda	Passed
15	January 29 (Day 106)	Special task	In connection to the birthday of Laziz's mother, as his close friend, Nathan and his fellow housemates must surprise Laziz after he is done talking with Big Brother in the confession room.	Nathan	Passed
16	February 1 (Day 109)	Secret task	Secret Messages; Basti was asked by Big Brother to send secret messages to Rica, in connection to his developing feelings for her. In order for Basti to create a secret message, Basti must go to the activity area and say "Rica, may tanong ako para sa'yo" (Rica, I have a question for you) and then say his question. Example: "Rica, may tanong ako para sa'yo. Kumain ka na ba?" (Rica, I have a question for you. Have you eaten?) The question will then be displayed on the plasma TV. He is given three questions every day to ask Rica secretly; this will go on for days until the time given by Big Brother that the housemates must guess the person who is sending those secret messages, and to whom is the secret sender sending the messages to. For this secret task to be successful, Rica and the other housemates (including houseguest Glenda) must not know that the questions displayed on the plasma TV are from Basti, that Basti is doing this task, and Rica must answer every question displayed on the plasma TV. Secret messages given by Basti to Rica: No. / Question (translated from Filipino) / Did Rica answer this question?; 1 / "Are you sad?" / Correct; 2 / "Do you like spaghetti?" / Correct; 3 / "Do you like Korean food?" / Correct; 4 / "Why did your 'M.U' (mutual understanding) hurt you before?" / Correct; 5 / "What are you looking for in a girlfriend/boyfriend?" / Correct; 6 / "If someone asked you to date, where would you like to go?" / Correct; 7 / "So your 'M.U' traded you (for a woman) farther?" / Correct; 8 / "So you want your man to be family oriented and strategic?" / Correct; 9 / "Can we meet tomorrow?" / Correct	Basti^{1}	Passed
17	February 6 (Day 114)	Secret task	KUPIDUO; A combination of the words "kupido" (Filipino word for Cupid) and duo, in preparation for the upcoming Valentine's Day, Seham and Zach were assigned and must dress as cupids. The both of them must help their fellow housemates in repairing their "broken hearts" through a series of tasks. The KupiDuo's missions: No. / Day given / Task / Participant(s) / Result; 1 / February 7 (Day 115) / Aleck, Basti, and Rica must fill a container in the garden area by swimming in the pool area while wearing their helmets that are attached with a shot glass with the help of the KupiDuos in filling the container by using the water in the pool. One second will be added to Rica's reward for every 1ml passed by the water in the container. They were given an hour to complete this task. Once completed, all of the seconds banked will go to a video message sent by Rica's step-mother to her that was seen by herself in a special room. The three collected 37ml out of a possible 100ml to collect in the container; this gave Rica 37 seconds to view a video message from her step-mother. / Aleck, Basti, Rica / Passed; 2 / February 9 (Day 117) / Nathan and Zach must connect a broken heart while going to a specified platform in the activity area while wearing bands. One minute will be added to Nathan's reward for every 12 minutes that they stay, connect and form each other's hearts in the platform. For their final round, Nathan must stay in the platform for one hour while still wearing the bands they wore earlier, and one minute will still be added to the reward for every 12 minutes passed, garnering a possible and additional five minutes for Nathan's reward, making a possible total of 11 minutes of time banked if they stayed for a whole hour. In conclusion, the pair gained nine minutes for Nathan to talk and have a date with his wife in a special room. / Nathan, Zach / Passed; 3 / February 11 (Day 119) / Jaye, Isabel, and Seham must construct a picture of Jaye in the activity area by first, selecting two cards placed on separate tables that contains the same picture as the other card in the garden area, similar to a memory game. Once all cards are matched, they can go to the activity area, and Jaye must construct a picture of Basti (using the back portion of the cards from earlier) in a specified spot. They must do both of these tasks in one hour. A special reward was given to Jaye in regards to Basti with the connection to Jaye willing to sacrifice his place in the game for his sibling; if Basti was evicted in any eviction night starting from the second eviction night, Jaye would be evicted instead of Basti, but it all depends on Basti if he wants to trade places with his brother. / Jaye, Isabel, Seham / Passed	Seham and Zach	Passed
18	February 8 (Day 116)	Reward task	Birthday Rag Doll; Raf must dress, act, and pose like a Barbie doll in a box for 260 minutes (4 hours and 20 minutes). She can only be moved by her brother Nathan when Big Brother gives Nathan a signal on the plasma TV an assigned place, position, and a pose for the last 100 minutes to where he can place Raf to. Once completed, Raf will have a chance to talk to her parents in a special room for 100 seconds.	Raf	Passed
19	February 11 (Day 119)	Reward task	Aleck, Basti, Kathleen, and Rica must transfer 100 flowers from a designated spot up to the garden from where they placed their flowers in the activity area to a garden in one hour while both of the pairs are wearing heart costumes. Each pair must attach and place a flower to the garden using a garter. One flower placed into the garden is equivalent to double the flowers earned by the housemates. For the last 20 minutes of the said task, both of the pairs must be tied in each other's foot. In conclusion, 61 flowers were transferred by the pairs; therefore, the flowers earned by the housemates were then doubled to 122 flowers.	Aleck, Basti, Kathleen, and Rica	Passed
20	February 14 (Day 122)	Reward task	To get their needed supplies in decorating their gowns for their weekly task, all of the housemates must walk an elevated pathway while wearing high heels and wearing a costume similar to a chicken while holding and balancing the "eggs" in both of their hands. They must start again if one, many, or all of the "eggs" that they hold in their hands fall down or if they fall down while walking on the pathway.	All housemates	Passed
21	February 17 (Day 125)	Special task	Trading of Roses; The nominees (Basti, Gin, Jaye, Kathleen, and Zach) were tasked by Big Brother to trade and give their black rose that was given to them during the third nomination night into an actual rose to their fellow housemate of their choice and explain on why they gave that housemate their rose. Roses given by the nominees: No. / Nominee / Given to / Reason; 1 / Jaye / Isabel / Told Isabel that he has a crush on her.; 2 / Gin / Nathan / Talked to Nathan because they have not had a serious conversation.; 3 / Kathleen / Raf / To forgive her on their confrontation on the girls' bedroom that was shown yesterday.; 4 / Basti / Roque / Thanked Roque for being a friend and a brother.; 5 / Zach / Seham / Admitted that they liked each other (especially during their KupiDuo task).	Basti, Gin, Jaye, Kathleen, and Zach	Passed
22	February 22 (Day 130)	Secret task	Paramdam (English: Feelingly); As the fake-evictees of their Ligtask challenge, Gin, Isabel, Kathleen, Roque, and Zach were tasked by Big Brother to secretly sneak into the house and give hints to the housemates through a series of tasks. The other housemates must not know that they are inside the house. The Paramdam task result: No. / Task; 1 / All of them must sneak into the house and do general cleaning and prepare a meal for the housemates.; 2 / All of them were tasked to select the housemates that they think that are undeserving to be in the Top 2 by crossing out their pictures with red paint. Then, they must place the pictures in the living area.; 3 / All of them must help their fellow housemates in their weekly task by using their voices as their paramdam.; 4 / All of them must bang on the hallway door as their paramdam to the housemates.; 5 / All of them must use their voice as their final paramdam to the housemates by helping them in their weekly task.	Gin, Isabel, Kathleen, Roque, and Zach	Passed
23	February 23 (Day 131)	Special task	Ninja Feels; Gin, Isabel, Kathleen, Roque, and Zach were tasked to dress and act as ninjas. As ninjas, they must distribute the materials needed for their weekly task. The housemates must not know that they are the ninjas while they are inside the house. They were also tasked to assign four housemates (to be given in pairs) to give the materials needed and a housemate to instruct the other housemates in their weekly task. The housemates' assignments in Ninja Feels: Housemate / Task; Isabel / Tasked to distribute the rope needed in their weekly task.; Kathleen / Tasked to distribute the rope needed in their weekly task.; Gin / Tasked to distribute the blocks needed in their weekly task.; Roque / Tasked to distribute the blocks needed in their weekly task.; Zach / Tasked to instruct the housemates in their weekly task.	Gin, Isabel, Kathleen, Roque, and Zach	Passed
24	March 4 (Day 140)	Secret reward task	Birthday Sacrifice; Zach volunteered to sacrifice himself for the day in exchange for a reward for his birthday celebration; as per said by Big Brother himself and by their agreement with each other, Zach was tasked to do all of the household chores (e.g. washing the dishes and cleaning the house) for that day and must also clean the "teeths" of his fellow housemates by acting like a dentist. The housemates must not know the reason why he is doing this task. In exchange for Zach's sacrifice, Zach had a one-on-one drink with the housemates and the houseplayers in the garden area to celebrate his birthday inside the house.	Zach	Passed
Teens
Camp Tasks
1	March 13 (Day 149)	Special task	Big Summer Adventure; All of the Teen housemates were sent to a secluded forest that is located far away from the Big Brother House instead of entering immediately. To test their camaraderie, teamwork, and creativity, both of the groups must accomplish a series of tasks given by Big Brother in order for them to finally enter the House. The Teen housemates were divided into two camps: Camp Masagana (Abundant), where all of their materials and camping gears needed were already provided, and Camp Matyaga (Persevering), where they must find their materials and camping gears through tasks. Teams: Camp Masagana: Dustine, Eslam, Gabb, Maxine, and Rob; Camp Matiyaga: Ashton, Don, Kai, Luke, Stef, and Tiff	All housemates	Passed
2	March 17 (Day 153)	Special task	In order to get to know each other, the members of Camp Masagana were tasked to list their memories through two badges: the Badge of Honor (colored white) signifying good memories, and the Badge of Horror (colored black) signifying bad memories. Then, they must explain why and paste both of the badges on their respective sashes.	Dustine, Eslam, Gabb, Maxine, and Rob	Passed
3	March 17 (Day 153)	Special task	The members of Camp Matyaga were tasked to send a member that will go to the other group, Camp Masagana, for that housemate to get to know the other group. The group played a fair game wherein the last man standing will be their representative and will go to the other camp. At the end of the game, Ashton won against Don and was the sole representative that will go to Camp Masagana. Ashton told the members of Camp Masagana about the other housemates, their lifestyles, on how they live there, their friendships, and their surroundings.	Ashton	Passed
House Tasks
4	March 20 (Day 156)	Reward task	Back to the '90s The two new teen housemates, Paolo and Stephanie, were "trapped" in the 90s as they entered a '90s themed room. The housemates must help to "retrieve" them through a task—they must identify five things that were built in the '90s that is displayed in the plasma TV. The items are placed in the garden area and must present it to Big Brother for verification. Only two of them can present at the same time. A bell sound will play once they are correct. Items found on Back to the '90s task: No. / Item / Found by; 1 / 10 Teks (texted game cards) / Kai, Maxine; 2 / Pager / Ashton, Dustine; 3 / Diskette / Eslam, Luke; 4 / 5 inflatable plastic balloons / Don, Rob; 5 / VHS tape / Gabb, Tiff	All housemates	Passed
5	March 21 (Day 157)	Special task	While wearing their school uniforms and inside a '90s themed classroom, the housemates have to go back to the youth stories of the photographs that they see and attached in the notebooks inside of their respective bags that are named after them. They must share their experiences and stories of their parents while they were on their youth days.	All housemates	Passed
6	March 23 (Day 159)	Reward task	Tatsing (English: Touching); In order to receive an additional attempt for their weekly task, the housemates must play a popular '90s game in the Philippines—tatsing. The housemates must defeat the ninjas (dubbed by Big Brother as Batang '90s ['90s Kids]) that will serve as their opponents in the game. In the play area, there are thirty slippers that they can hit using a pamato (shooter) away from the area; twenty of those are colored white, while the remaining ten are black. One point is added to a groups' score if a white slipper is hit and has been removed from the area; otherwise, if they remove a black slipper, one point will be deducted from their score. No score will be added if the slipper moves and does not move away from the area. Only six housemates at a time can participate. As task leaders, Ashton and Gabb were asked if they can switch the members of their groups. The team with the highest points after the round wins the game. Final score: Batang '90s / Teen Housemates; 10 / 0^{1}	Ashton, Dustine, Eslam, Gabb, Luke, Maxine, Stef, and Tiff	Failed
7	March 24 (Day 160)	Secret reward task	Dustine, Gabb, Luke, and Paolo must perform four scoring methods used in basketball: lay-up, free throw, three-points, and half-court. They must perform all of those methods without failing to shoot the ball to earn one point. Only one of them must perform one method at a time. They must gain five points in order for Gabb to successfully receive a special reward for her parents. In addition, Gabb and the other housemates must not know that the task is for Gabb's parents. This secret task was only told to Dustine, Luke, and Paolo.	Dustine, Gabb, Luke, and Paolo	Passed
8	March 25 (Day 161)	Reward task	Kumu Room Presents: Rewind; Chosen by users through Kumunity Decides, Stephanie was asked to do and host a live stream along with the rest of the housemates. They must gather at least 2,000 concurrent views of their livestream on Kumu after two hours in order for them to get an additional attempt for their weekly task.	Stephanie	Failed
9	March 26 (Day 162)	Special task	As leaders of the second weekly task, Ashton and Gabb were summoned by Big Brother to the confession room to have a fun activity: to play jackstone and inflatable plastic balloons, which were popular during the '90s. They were divided into two groups with Ashton and Gabb assigned as their respective leaders and selected their group members.	Ashton and Gabb	Passed
10	March 27 (Day 163)	Special task	Like and Dislike; Similar to liking a post on Instagram, all of the housemates were tasked by Big Brother to put a heart on the housemate (except for the five nominees) that they think that they were connected and close by placing a heart below on that housemates' picture of and must explain their reasons why. The most-liked housemate will wear the Most Liked Pin; as the most-liked housemate, Maxine was given a privilege: the five nominated housemates (Don, Kai, Rob, Stef, and Stephanie) must "serve" her by acting like maids for the rest of the day. This task was also set for the remaining unnominated housemates while wearing the Most Disliked Pin. The result of Like and Dislike task: Housemate / Gave heart to / No. of hearts received; Ashton / Luke / 3; Don / Paolo / 0; Dustine / Luke / 1; Eslam / Gabb / 0; Gabb / Ashton / 2; Kai / Dustine / 0; Luke / Ashton / 2; Maxine / Gabb / 4; Paolo / Maxine / 1; Rob / Maxine / 0; Stef / Ashton / 0; Stephanie / Maxine / 0; Tiff / Maxine / 0	All housemates	Passed
11	March 27 (Day 163)	Special task	As task leaders, Dustine and Maxine were tasked by Big Brother to remove one of a nominated housemates' Most Disliked Pin at a time that the nominees wore earlier. Both of them sought the help of the unnominated housemates for further interrogation. Once removed, the nominated housemate can then stop serving the other unnominated housemates and will be served by the remaining housemate/s.	Dustine and Maxine	Passed
12	March 28 (Day 164)	Special task	The housemates were tasked to share their experiences and memories about their lives on the outside world that they have shared on their respective social media accounts while standing on a heart emoji; but if they see something that has greatly affected them, they will also tell it while standing on an angry emoji.	All housemates	Passed
13	April 2 (Day 169)	Special reward task	The housemates were tasked to clean and sanitize the whole house in pairs while being tied in each other's arms by selecting the part of the house that they will be assigned to clean in a row of tissue papers that has the word CHEERS hidden inside them along with a smiley emoji that signifies as the supervisor of the task. The pair chosen by the supervisor will receive a special reward provided by Big Brother. The housemates' assignments: Letter / Housemates assigned / Area; C / Eslam and Stephanie / Kitchen Area; H / Dustine and Paolo / CR & Gym Area; E (1st and 2nd E) / Maxine and Tiff / Boys' Bedroom; E (3rd and 4th E) / Gabb and Stef / Girls' Bedroom; R / Luke and Rob / Living Room; S / Don and Kai / Garden Area; / Ashton / None (Supervisor)	All housemates	Passed
14	April 4 (Day 171)	Reward task	After explaining to the housemates and Big Brother about missing her father, Stephanie was tasked by Big Brother to do the following tasks in order to see her father that is diagnosed with throat cancer that she hadn't bond with for a long time. Once Stephanie successfully completes all of her tasks, she can have a one-on-one video chat with her father in a special room. The result of Stephanie's task: Task No. / Task description / Result; 1 / Stephanie was tasked to compose a song for her father. / Passed; 2 / Stephanie must teach five of her fellow housemates of her choice on how to properly play the guitar by using an acoustic guitar. / Passed; 3 / Stephanie was also tasked to teach a "foreign exchange student" on how to play the guitar and must do a performance by performing her now newly composed song for her father. Unbeknownst to Stephanie, the "foreign exchange student" was actually her father, who has been observing her while she was doing the second task, which made her emotional. / Passed	Stephanie	Passed
15	April 6 (Day 173)	Secret reward task	Inspiration to Lead; The weekly task leaders, Dustine and Luke, were informed separately that they must complete the weekly task to them in exchange for a reward to their loved ones in the outside world. For Dustine, this will give his brother Austin some school supplies for his education, while for Luke, this will give her mother a small capital (₱10,000) for their sari-sari store.	Dustine and Luke	Passed
16	April 10 (Day 177)	Special task	The housemates were tasked to write the things that their loved ones have did to them by writing it on each of their respective big rocks represented by their hometowns that are placed on different parts of the house and must share it to their fellow housemates in the living area.	All housemates	Passed
17	April 11 (Day 178)	Special task	My Sacrifice; Tiff was tasked by Big Brother to do the following tasks for his younger brother, Jan-jan that is diagnosed with autism. She must grant the three wishes of her younger brother. The result of Tiff's My Sacrifice task: Task No. / Task description / Result; 1 / Tiff was tasked to make lunch for the housemates and for his younger brother that will be delivered to their house that same day. / Passed; 2 / As one of her brother's wishes, Tiff was tasked to cook adobo. She can seek the help of two housemates of her choice. Selected housemates: Paolo and Rob / Passed; 3 / Tiff must do sessions with his younger brother with the housemates—to do therapy and teaching. She can seek the help of two housemates for each of the lessons for this task. Selected housemates: Ashton and Maxine (teaching), Dustine and Stephanie (therapy) / Passed; 4 / As one of her brother's wishes, Tiff was tasked to cook cookies. She can seek the help of Eslam and Stef for this task. / Passed; 5 / As one of her brother's wishes, Tiff was tasked to wrap the gifts Big Brother provided for his younger brother. She can seek the housemates' help for this task. / Passed	Tiff	Passed
18	April 11 (Day 178)	Secret reward task	Thank You Mate; Part 1: Chosen by users through Kumunity Decides, Eslam and Stef must help the mothers of Ashton and Rob in creating a pathway that can be found scattered in the activity area. The other housemates, including Ashton and Rob, must not know this task.	Eslam and Stef	Passed
18	April 11 (Day 178)	Secret reward task	Part 2: Using the pathway that Eslam and Stef along with their mothers have made earlier, Ashton and Rob must carry a 145-kilogram tire from the maze starting from the starting point up to the finish line and again to the starting point and vice versa. They must do this 37 times (which is the sum of both of their ages) in order for them to have a special date with their mothers. Unbeknownst to Ashton and Rob, this was a secret sacrifice for each other.	Ashton and Rob	Passed
18	April 11 (Day 178)	Secret reward task	Part 3: Hours after the main task was finished, Eslam and Stef were tasked by Big Brother to become waiters for the special dates with their mothers. They can seek the two housemates of their choice.	Eslam, Gabb, Luke, and Stef	Passed
19	April 17 (Day 184)	Secret task	As the new batch of nominees, Ashton, Paolo, Rob, and Stephanie must make sure that for the entire week, the other housemates, including the other nominees except for themselves—must not know that they are nominated for eviction.	Ashton, Paolo, Rob, and Stephanie	Passed
20	April 19 (Day 186)	Reward task	What Would Kim Do? In celebration of Teen Edition 1 Big Winner Kim Chiu's birthday inside the house, the female members of Tour Group (Gabb, Maxine, and Tiff) were tasked by Big Brother to act like her. Successfully completing this task will reward them the cake Big Brother provided for Chiu.	Gabb, Maxine, and Tiff	Passed
21	April 19 (Day 186)	Reward task	JC must braid and attach altogether the hairs of Gabb, Maxine, and Tiff along with the wigs of Dustine and Luke just like what Chiu did when she was still a teen housemate. The five of them must sit first while JC braids the wigs and must stand altogether once finished and must go round in circles until Big Brother gives his signal.	Dustine, Gabb, JC, Luke, Maxine, and Tiff	Passed
22	April 20 (Day 187)	Reward task	The Tour Group must find the 15 items that are included on JC and Paolo's family photo that can be found scattered on the activity area. They can only find five items at a time and must place it in a container for Paolo to get the items after they have found the items that they need. They must find all 15 items in order for Paolo to see JC and his father while doing their last human diorama task (which is to re-enact their family photo). The items they need to find in this task: No. / Item / Result; 1 / Spread/mayonnaise / Correct; 2 / Ketchup / Correct; 3 / Flowers / Correct; 4 / Watermelon / Correct; 5 / Blue shirt / Correct; 6 / Red-striped sando / Correct; 7 / Checkered polo and brown top / Correct; 8 / Yellow shirt / Correct; 9 / Grapes in a bowl / Correct; 10 / Banana leaves / Correct; 11 / Bread with container / (found on second try); 12 / Broom with dustpan / Correct; 13 / Sling bag / Correct; 14 / Kettle / Correct; 15 / Rice cooker / (found on second try)	Dustine, Gabb, Luke, Maxine, and Tiff	Passed
23	April 21 (Day 188)	Special task	After rushing to the Confession Room thinking that the other group (Tour Group) was there, the Museum Group were tasked by Big Brother to write their message on a big piece of paper to a selected Tour Group member of their choice. The same task was given to the opposite group a day later.	All housemates	Passed
23	April 23 (Day 190)	Special task	The housemates were finally reunited moments after the result of their Past is Past weekly task. In line with this and with the housemates' missing each other after days of separation, Stephanie was first tasked to compose a message for all of the housemates or to a housemate of their choice. The same task was then given to the other housemates. Unbeknownst to Stephanie, she was chosen by users through Kumunity Decides.	All housemates	Passed
24	April 23 (Day 190)	Special task	Six days after the nominees were determined and keeping it a secret, as the current Head of Household, Tiff was tasked to reveal the current nominees to the housemates by scratching the picture that is covered in scratchable ink by using a big coin that will then reveal the picture of a nominated housemate.	Tiff	Passed
25	May 1 (Day 198)^{2}	Special reward task	Divided into three groups, the housemates must race to move the three paper cups that are filled with flour and is inserted on a string on each of the three stations and must get it to the end of a string until another housemate will blow their assigned paper cup. They must only use their mouths to blow their respective paper cups. The team that reaches first to the end of their station and turns on the air conditioner's switch will get a reward that will surely beat the heat this summer: a halo-halo provided by Big Brother. Teams: Team 1 (Red Team): Dustine, Eslam, and Tiff; Team 2 (White Team): Gabb, Paolo, and Rob; Team 3 (Black Team): Luke, Maxine, and Stephanie	All housemates	Passed
26	May 7 (Day 204)	Reward task	How Well Do You Know Each Other? Rob and Stephanie were tasked to host a game show that tests how well the five housemates know their respective mothers. To score a point, the housemates must match the answers of their respective mothers. The pair that gets three points wins while the pair that scores less than three will receive a fun punishment; they must dance in front with their respective mothers in the living area. Once completed, Rob and Stephanie will get a chance to see their respective mothers virtually.	Rob and Stephanie	Passed
27	May 7 (Day 204)	Punishment task	As a consequence of the numerous violations the teen housemates have committed during their stay, they were asked to choose between one of the two punishments: either they would (a), kneel while doing their task; or (b), stand while doing their task. The majority of the housemates chose A; therefore, the housemates must kneel for 100 minutes and do their tasks at the same time.	All housemates	Passed
Biga-10 Housemates
1	May 15 (Day 212)	Reward task	The Kumunity Top Twos must sit altogether on a cloth in the activity area by sitting with each other and using their feet to move the cloth on the line on a conveyor belt without ever lifting their buttocks. They will receive a balikbayan box that contains a colored key that will unlock the balikbahay box that contains the wildcard housemates from each Kumunity in the garden area. They can then do the task again if a balikbahay box has been opened. They must do this task three times in order for the wildcard housemates Brenda, Madam Inutz, Maxine, Michael Ver, Stephanie, and Zach to re-enter the house.	Anji, Gabb, Isabel, Nathan, Rob, and Samantha	Passed
2	May 16 (Day 213)	Special task	Anji was tasked to create a new version of her song Dalampasigan along with Rob.	Anji and Rob	Passed
3	May 17 (Day 214)	Special task	After revealing their respective colored boxes that are filled with their baby pictures, all of the housemates were tasked to share some moments when they were on their youth days.	All housemates	Passed
4	May 17 (Day 214)	Charity task	Biga-10 Bayanihan para sa Bantay Bata (English: Big Community Spirit for Child Guard); All of the housemates in their respective Kumunities were tasked to create a 5-minute superhero-themed play. They must assign one housemate as their brand ambassador/ambassadress of Bantay Bata: Children's Village. They were allowed to create costumes and the script for the said play. The public will then select a housemate to become the face of the said beneficiary. Viewers can send virtual gifts to a Kumunity of their choice on Kumu within 24 hours after the plays' broadcast. The Kumunity that has the highest virtual gifts garnered at the end of the voting period will become the face of Bantay Bata: Children's Village.	All housemates	Passed
5	May 20 (Day 217)^{1}	Special reward task	Kumunity Clash! The housemates were tasked to do a Kumu live stream for fun where they must clash with each Kumunity in a series of games such as punong braso (arm wrestling), staring contest, and charades prepared by Big Brother. The winning Kumunity will receive a special reward from Big Brother.	All housemates	Passed
6	May 27 (Day 224)^{2}	Special reward task	Palarong Pang-Good Vibes (English: Game of Good Vibes); In this special task sponsored by local ice cream brand Creamline, the Biga-10 housemates were divided into three groups based on the different products sold by Creamline through a series of three fun Filipino classic games prepared by Big Brother in the activity area. Each group will play their assigned game; these consists of three stations. They must complete all three games in 30 minutes in order for the groups to receive a special reward provided by Creamline and Big Brother.	All housemates	Passed

Notes

Celebrities

1. The remaining Big coins would be reused when Kyle and Chie entered the house, added 4,437.2 Big coins from their pre-entry ambagan tasks with the remaining balance as of Day 1, and shopped for more appliances on Day 5.

Adults

1. On Basti's behalf, Jaye and Nathan helped give the seventh and eighth questions respectively.

Teens

1. The teen housemates scored 0 points as they removed four white and black slippers during the game.
2. Eslam and Luke were in the house before they were both evicted that same night. Team 2 won this game and was rewarded a halo-halo by Big Brother.

Biga-10

1. Madam Inutz was in the house before she was evicted that same day. The Celebrities (Anji, Brenda, Madam Inutz, and Samantha) won this clash.
2. Even though there were three groups for this task, no official group list was shown during the broadcast of the task. Still, the housemates completed this task and therefore won a foodcart.

== Challenges ==
=== Head of Household ===
Every week, all of the housemates (excluding newly entered housemates) will compete to become the House's Head of Household. Those who win the title will be immune from the nominations and, therefore, cannot be evicted for that particular week. In an event of a tie, participants with the winning score or time will be both named as Head of Household. Just like the previous season, during each of the weekly challenges, the public may send padalucks or virtual Kumu gifts to their chosen housemate. The housemate with the most padalucks will get an advantage for the challenge.

Challenge No.	Date given	Challenge title and description	Head of Household
Celebrities
1	October 23 (Day 8)	Battle for Immunity; While holding a large invitation card, each of the housemates must reach point B from point A by stepping onto a series of eight balance balls. If ever they fell from any of the balls, they will have to go back to point A and restart the challenge. The housemate with the fastest time wins the challenge. Padaluck recipient: Eian (7 balance balls to step on instead of 8)	Brenda
2	November 7 (Day 23)^{1}	School Trip; While wearing their school uniforms, each housemate must be able to memorize 6 items. They will only be allowed to start the challenge once the school bell rings. Once they will hear the bell, they will first have to gather all the books provided, place the books in a school bag, and carry the said bag while doing the challenge. Afterwards, they will then have to raise a flag in order to reveal 6 individual items; in case that they may forget the items or the correct order, they are allowed to raise the flag again. From a locker, they will then have to search for the said 6 items one by one and arrange them in the correct order. If they feel that they got the correct order, they may submit their answer by pressing the red button; a bell sound will be played if they got the correct answer. The housemate with fastest time to finish wins the challenge. Padaluck recipient: Eian (5 items required to memorize instead of 6)	TJ
3	November 14 (Day 30)	Pinoy Small Brother House Within 100 seconds and by only using a big pair of tongs, each of the housemates must stack tiny colored cylinders to a tiny pedestal placed in miniature model of the House's outdoor area. Each of the colored cylinder is equivalent to a certain point: 1 point for a blue cylinder, two points for a red cylinder, and three points for a yellow cylinder; only standing cylinders will be counted. The housemate(s) with the most number of points wins the challenge. Padaluck recipient: Eian (additional 20-second advantage from 100 seconds)	Madam Inutz, Samantha
4	November 27 (Day 43)^{2}	Perfect Punch Challenge; Each housemate must punch a hanging punching bag in order for it to move towards the HOH mark. They are given five attempts to punch the bag. The housemate with the nearest distance to the HOH mark wins the challenge. Padaluck recipient: KD (additional two attempts from 5)	Anji
Adults
1	January 9 (Day 85)	Using a remote controller, each housemate must navigate a drone through an obstacle course consisting of a set of four hoops of varying sizes and heights, and of a tunnel. The housemate that can land their drone at the end point at the fastest time wins the challenge. Padaluck recipient: Isabel (decreased to three hoops)	Nathan
2	February 13 (Day 121)^{1}	Using any parts of their body (except for their hands), each housemate must transfer a ball through cylindrical obstacle course without falling it. If ever they fell a ball, they will go back to the starting point. The housemate with the fastest time to finish, wins the challenge.	Michael Ver
Teens
1	March 26 (Day 162)	Each housemate must transfer two CDs that is inserted on a slinky and must move it to the end of the slinky by only using their body. The housemate that transfers both of the CDs at the fastest time wins the challenge. Padaluck recipient: Stef (first to create time to beat)	Maxine
2	April 4 (Day 171)	The housemates must imitate the three positions displayed on a blackboard while laying flat on the floor and holding a book on their foot. They must start again from the beginning if ever the book falls. When finished, they must stand on a stair and make a bow to stop their time. The housemate that does this in the fastest time wins the challenge. Padaluck recipient: Paolo (one minute was added to his time to beat)	Stef
3	April 17 (Day 184)^{1,} ^{2}	History Picture Quiz Bee; A deviation of the widely criticized History Quiz Bee, the housemates must guess the pictures displayed by Big Brother on the plasma TV. The first housemate to answer five questions correctly wins the challenge.	Tiff

Notes

Celebrities

1. Jordan was exempt from performing this challenge as he entered the house four days before the second nomination proceedings.
2. Kyle participated in this challenge before being evicted on the same night. As the result of this challenge was presented on Day 44, Kyle's name and final length were excluded from the leaderboard.

Adults

1. No Padaluck campaign was held on Kumu for this challenge—as of this date, the reason for this is still unknown. Zach was the first housemate to do this challenge as he was chosen by users through Kumunity Decides.

Teens

1. Stef participated in this challenge before being evicted on the same night. If she was saved from eviction, she would be with the Museum Group for the upcoming Past is Past weekly task.
2. No Padaluck recipient and campaign was held on Kumu for this challenge to ensure fairness for all the housemates.

=== Ligtask ===
The Ligtask challenge, carried over from previous seasons, were usually held in lieu of the Heads of Household challenge.

Task No.	Date given	Challenge title and description	Participants	Saved
Adults
1	February 20 (Day 128)	The housemates (except Nathan, Raf, and Seham) must shoot one of their assigned balls into two different sizes of round cylinders above a platform. The first five housemates to do this will be saved from eviction; while the remaining housemates who did not shoot their respective balls will be evicted.^{1}	Gin, Isabel, Kathleen, Laziz, Michael Ver, Roque, Zach	Laziz, Michael Ver^{2}
2	February 21 (Day 129)	Isabel, Kathleen, and Roque were tasked to balance and stack two blocks on each end of a pole while undergoing a maze. They must start again from the beginning of the maze if any of their stacked blocks fall down. They were given 30 minutes to complete this task.	Isabel, Kathleen, Roque	None^{3}

Notes

1. As part of a twist, the first two housemates to do this challenge will be saved instead of five.
2. Even though only Laziz and Michael Ver were saved from this eviction as per the announcement by Big Brother, Isabel, Kathleen, and Roque were also saved from eviction as they have also successfully shot their balls on the container as part of the original rules before the twist occurred.
3. The evictee for this task was never revealed as the three of them did not finish the challenge in time. After the challenge, Big Brother announced that the three of them were "evicted"; but Big Brother placed a twist. Instead, the three were fake-evicted and were sent to a secret room.

=== Group challenges ===
Just like in previous seasons, in the housemates were split in multiple teams to compete for immunity on multiple occasions.

Challenge No.	Date given	Challenge title and description	Winner	Loser(s)
Celebrities
1	November 14 (Day 30)	Pinoy Big Brother Games 2021; Alyssa, Benedix and Jordan were informed that the housemates will participate in the Pinoy Big Brother Games wherein the housemates, in groups of five, will compete for points in a series of games with the group earning the most points winning immunity for the next nomination round. The three were also assigned as leaders for their respective five person teams. To determine which team will the housemates be part of, except for the team captains, all of the housemates were tasked to do a series of physical challenge to complete: 100 jumping jacks, 50 squats, and 30 burpees. After finishing all the exercises, the housemate to finish first will then have to get their corresponding rank badge; the others will also have to follow suit according to their rank. The rank badge will determine their order of when they will have to choose their teams of choice. After the first ranking housemate had chosen his or her team, the next in rank will then follow. Teams: Phenomenal Altos: Alyssa (captain), Alexa, Chie, KD and Kyle; Bigateam: Benedix (captain), Brenda, Eian, Karen and TJ; Jordan's Angels: Jordan (captain), Anji, Madam Inutz, Samantha and Shanaia; The games of Pinoy Big Brother Games 2021: Challenge No. / Date given / Challenge title and description / Points earned; Challenge No. / Date given / Challenge title and description / Phenomenal Altos / Bigateam / Jordan's Angels; 1 / Nov. 15 (Day 31) / Flag Game; While in a boxing ring, each representative of the three teams per round will have to take the flags of the other team representatives while wearing a pair of boxing gloves. If any of the said representatives' flags are taken by the others, he or she will earn no point; if one can protect his or her flag from others, he or she will earn 1 point; and if one can take any of the other team representatives' flags, he or she will earn two points. All in all, this game will be played in five rounds. The team with the most points will win this challenge. / 0 / 9 / 6; 2 / Nov. 16 (Day 32) / Land Swimming; Each representative must transfer the flag placed in point A by swimming using backstrokes onto a slippery floor to point B. They must also return to point A after transferring their respective flags. The first representative to finish the game will earn two points, the second with 1 point, and the last with no point. This game will also consists of five rounds and the team with the most points will win this challenge. / 7 / 5 / 3; 3 / Nov. 18 (Day 34) / Bottle Weightlifting; The housemates have to lift a barbell-like equipment and balance five bottles placed on top of each side (all in all, there will be a total of 10 bottles). Using the snatch technique in weightlifting, they will have to lift the barbell up while keeping the bottles from falling down. The points that each representative will earn will depend on the number of bottles he or she can keep standing. This game will have five rounds and the team with the most points wins this challenge. / 32 / 41 / 20; Total Points / / / 39 / 55 / 29	Bigateam	Phenomenal Altos, Jordan's Angels
2	November 29 (Day 45)	Tower Task; Each two groups of the divided House were given a task to create a tower made of blocks. The blocks will be taken from a platform placed at the center of pool. Since these blocks were not divided equally, each of the groups will have to take all the blocks that they can get using only panungkit or improvised poles that they will have to make. They will only have 20 minutes to get as many blocks as they could have. At the end of the week, the group that will be able to make the highest standing block tower will win immunity, while the losing group will be the ones who will be nominated for the next nominations. Teams: Yellow Team: Anji, Brenda, KD, Benedix, Madam Inutz, Samantha and Shanaia; Blue Team: Alyssa, Alexa, Jordan, TJ, Karen and Eian; Tower Task challenges: Challenge No. / Date given / Challenge title and description / Yellow Team / Blue Team; 1 / Nov. 30 (Day 46) / Extreme Tic-Tac-Toe; For five rounds, the first group to be able to make a three side-by-side pamato or pucks each round (hence, forming a tic-tac-toe pattern) will earn a point. Each round will have separate obstacles or to wear something in order to make the challenge more difficult. For the first round, they will have to cross over several tires; for the second round, they will have to use office chairs; for the third round, thy will have to do duck walks while being inside a sack bag; for the fourth round, each team will be walking in a three-legged race (per puck, two players will play per team); and lastly for the fifth round, they will now be allowed to sprint. The winning team of each round will be able to get an additional 70 blocks for their tower task. / Winner for Rounds 2, 3 and 4 (gained 210 blocks) / Winner for Rounds 1 and 5 (gained 140 blocks); 2 / Dec. 1 (Day 47) / Tug of War; Each team will have to pull each ends of a rope that has flag placed at the center of it. Each will have to pull the flag towards their group so that the flag will be able to get inside their area. Prior to challenge, each team will have to make a wager of blocks (between 50 and 150). If they lose, these wagered blocks will be taken by the winning team. Aside from the blocks taken from the other team, the winning team will also be able to get a ladder that could help them in building their tower. The first team to win three rounds, wins the challenge. Wagered blocks: Yellow Team: 150 blocks; Blue Team: 150 blocks / Lost (lost 150 blocks) / Won (gained 150 blocks); Final Height / / / 99 inches / 111 inches	Blue Team	Yellow Team
Adults
1	January 31 (Day 108)	Battle of the Duos; The housemates were informed that the house was split into two, it was also announced that the two pairs of leaders of their respective groups were related to each other; the two pairs of leaders being Raf and Nathan as Team Juane, and Basti and Jaye as Team Macaraan. The winning group at the end of this challenge will be given immunity; with the other group being the possible nominees for the second nominations. In order to determine the members of each group, first, the remaining housemates will pick a random number from a bowl; the housemates who picked the first numbers will then select their pair. Then, in the activity area, the two pairs of leaders must inflate a balloon and then pass it to a basket by using their heads. The two housemates standing on a podium will then belong to the winning pair. As the Macaraan Brothers have won the first three rounds, the remaining housemates (Isabel, Kathleen, Rica, Seham, Thamara, and Zach) were automatically assigned to Team Juane. Teams: Team Juane: Raf and Nathan (captains), Isabel, Kathleen, Rica, Seham, Thamara, and Zach; Team Macaraan: Basti and Jaye (captains), Andrei, Aleck, Gin, Laziz, Michael Ver, and Roque; The group challenges: Challenge No. / Date given / Challenge title and description / Team Juane / Team Macaraan; 1 / Feb. 2 (Day 110) / Home Along Da Riles (English: Home Along the Rails); In every group, four housemates in pairs of two must ride into a cart using only their body movement in order to move the cart. Once they reach into a row of keys, a housemate must get a key and a plunger to help them go back faster and unlock a lock from a box that has six locks that contains an immunity necklace. The two members of a pair will get a key separately, and then both of the pair will get another key together. The group who unlocks their respective box first wins this round. / Won / Lost; 2 / Feb. 3 (Day 111) / Goal Boal; Similar to the Paralympic sport goalball, while wearing safety gear and eyepatches, the remaining pair of each group that did not participate on the first challenge must catch the ball of the other pair with the first pair lying on the floor and the other pair standing. The pair standing must roll the ball into the floor, and the other pair must catch the ball using their hands. Points ranging from 2-3 points will be given to the standing pair if the other pair fails to catch the ball in one of the three areas of the other pairs' goal area. There will be two rounds that consists of two 10-minute half-times, for a total of 20 minutes for the pairs to play with. The group pair with the most points garnered during the game wins this round. / Lost / Won; Final score / / / 16 / 20; The winner for the group challenge was in favor for Team Macaraan for winning the tiebreaker in the second challenge.	~~Andrei~~, Jaye, Michael Ver, and Roque	Aleck, Basti, Gin, Laziz Team Juane
2	February 4–5 (Days 112-113)	Plot Twist; Big Brother informed the members of Team Macaraan that they have not claimed their immunity yet as a twist. He then gave a challenge to determine the final winners of the Battle of the Duos, and to also finally determine the possible nominees for the second nominations. To test their strategies, creativity, and patience, all of the members of Team Macaraan must stack a tower of blocks within 30 minutes. They were allowed to create the mechanics for their respective games against each other. At the end of all games, only four winners of their respective games against each other will then be given immunity for the second nominations, making the other four vulnerable for eviction. The plot twist challenges created by the housemates: Challenge No. / Date given / Challenge title and description / Winners / Losers; 1 / Feb. 4 (Day 112) / For the Macaraan brothers, Basti and Jaye, must stack a tower of blocks on a table within 30 minutes. The person who has the highest height of stacked blocks will be immune for the nominations; the other will be vulnerable for the second nominations. Jaye automatically won this round due to Basti's tower falling down seconds before their timer ran up, making Jaye immune for the second nominations. / Jaye (automatically won) / Basti (automatically lost); 2 / Feb. 4 (Day 112) / For Laziz and Michael Ver, they must run from a spot in the activity area and get their respective blocks using their hands to get blocks as they can carry. Then, once they have all the blocks they need, they can stack their blocks on the floor. The person who has the highest height of stacked blocks will be immune for the nominations; the other will be vulnerable for the second nominations. / Michael Ver (reached 5 feet) / Laziz (reached 4.6 feet); 3 / Feb. 5 (Day 113) / For Andrei and Aleck, similar to the block game Jenga, they must take turns on stacking their blocks and removing a block in turns to stack the removed block of their choosing from the bottom to the top of the blocks. The person who makes the stacked blocks fall loses the game and loses immunity; making the opponent immune for the nominations. Due to Aleck making their stacked blocks fall down, he automatically lost their game; making Andrei the winner and made him immune for the nominations; making Aleck the possible nominee for the second nominations. / ~~Andrei~~; ~~(automatically won)~~ / Aleck (automatically lost); 4 / Feb. 5 (Day 113) / For Gin and Roque, they must play a game of rock paper scissors first to determine who will play first. Then, the winner must first shoot a ball into a glass. The one who shoots three of their respective balls first will then stack their blocks; this will go on for three rounds until someone wins. Because Roque won all of the rounds, he automatically won his game and was immune for the nominations; making Gin vulnerable for eviction. / Roque (automatically won) / Gin (automatically lost); At the end of the group challenge, only Andrei, Jaye, Michael Ver, and Roque of Team Macaraan have claimed immunity for the second nominations; leaving their fellow team members Aleck, Basti, Gin, and Laziz, along with the members of Team Juane vulnerable for eviction. Although Andrei won his battle against Aleck, he was evicted prior to the second nomination night, which rendered his immunity void.	~~Andrei~~, Jaye, Michael Ver, and Roque	Aleck, Basti, Gin, Laziz Team Juane
Teens
1	April 4 (Day 171)	PBB University; Served as both a weekly task and a group challenge, the housemates were divided into two groups. They must compete with each other through a series of tasks or "examinations" through different subjects that are taught at schools such as Language and Science to get the materials needed for their weekly task. Teams: Team Dustine: Dustine (leader), Kai, Paolo, Rob, Stef, and Stephanie; Team Luke: Luke (leader), Ashton, Eslam, Gabb, Maxine, and Tiff; The challenges and tasks given on PBB University: Challenge No. / Date given / Challenge title and description / Team Dustine / Team Luke; 1 / April 4 (Day 171) / To determine the members of each group, the task leaders, or "student leaders", Dustine and Luke, must try to swing a ring to apply it to a hook. Once completed, they should bring the PBB University logo close to their side until a leader successfully reaches the logo to the end of their side. Then, they must choose which housemate they think that should belong to their group. This must be completed in five rounds. / N/A; 2 / April 6 (Day 173) / Plastic Bottle Boat Task; The housemates in both groups must successfully create a boat made from different sizes of water bottles. Their boats must not sink and must hold multiple people when tested. The housemates must ride their respective boats in two at a time while wearing their toga hats. They must reach the other end of the pool three times in opposite directions to reach the other pairs until all six of them ride the boat for the last time to reach the finish line and must bow altogether to stop their time. The group that reaches the finish line in the fastest time wins and is safe from the next round of nominations. If both groups are successful, they will be given their weekly budget, otherwise, if only one of the groups succeed, they will be given half of the budget, or none if both of the groups failed to successfully create a boat. They were given one week to complete this task. / Lost (5 minutes and 35 seconds) / Won (2 minutes and 36 seconds); 3 / April 6 (Day 173) / Math Quiz Bee; To get an advantage in creating their boats, the first five housemates of a group must successfully answer a math equation by undergoing first through five stations with different mechanics. Then, they can then reveal the number hidden inside the plate once completed (except for Stations 2, 4, and 5 which they must count the numbers by their hands). They must do this one-by-one in the activity area. The sixth housemate must then identify the correct equation. The groups must successfully guess the numbers that when solved, must answer the number 10. The group that does this in the fastest time wins and gets additional materials for their weekly task. The Math Quiz Bee stations: Station No. / Station title and description / Number; 1 / Ampalaya Smoothie (English: Bittergourd Smoothie); The housemate must remove the lid and drink the bittergourd shake. Once empty, the housemate can then look at the number at the bottom of the plate. / 888; 2 / Puso ng Manok (English: Chicken Heart); The housemate must insert their hands into the box that contains chicken hearts and count how many are inside it while cannot be seen or looked at. / 95; 3 / Mata ng Baka (English: Cow's Eye); The housemate must remove the lid to eat and consume the cow's eye. They must fully consume the said exotic food to reveal the hidden number at the bottom of the plate. / 37; 4 / Jolens (English: Marbles); The housemate must stand in the designated area on the floor and from there count the marbles without touching or being near in the marbles. / 102; 5 / Fake Ipis (English: Fake Cockroaches); The housemate must insert two hands inside the box and count how many fake cockroaches are inside of the box. / 8; The result of Math Quiz Bee task: Station No. / Assigned housemate / Final time; Team Dustine: 1 / Stephanie / Time undisclosed; 2 / Paolo / Time undisclosed; 3 / Kai / Time undisclosed; 4 / Dustine / Time undisclosed; 5 / Stef / Time undisclosed; 6 / Rob / Time undisclosed; Team Luke: 1 / Luke / 1 hour and 24 minutes; 2 / Gabb / 1 hour and 24 minutes; 3 / Maxine / 1 hour and 24 minutes; 4 / Ashton / 1 hour and 24 minutes; 5 / Tiff / 1 hour and 24 minutes; 6 / Eslam / 1 hour and 24 minutes / Lost / Won; 4 / April 7 (Day 174) / History Quiz Bee; One student from each team will go to a podium and must answer history-related questions which will be asked by Professor Robi by pressing their respective buzzers to answer. There are balloons placed above each player—each correct answer of a team will inflate the balloon of the opponent. The opponent's balloon will explode once a team gets two correct answers. The first student to get two correct answers is equivalent to one point for their team and the team that gathers three points first at the end of the game wins and gets additional materials for their weekly task. The result of History Quiz Bee task: Round No. / Question (translated from Filipino) / Answer / Result; Round No. / Question (translated from Filipino) / Answer / Team Dustine / Team Luke; Dustine vs. Luke: 1 / Where is the "Summer Capital of the Philippines"? / Baguio / Wrong / Correct; 1 / Complete the full name of national hero Jose Rizal: José Protacio Rizal _____ y Alonso Realonda. / Mercado / Correct / Wrong; 1 / In which war was the First Republic of the Philippines first established? / Philippine-American War / Wrong / Correct; Paolo vs. Maxine: 2 / How many and what are the colors found in the Philippine flag? / 4 (Blue, Red, Yellow and White) / Correct / Wrong; 2 / By what name is the Filipino General Gregorio del Pilar better known? / Goyo / Correct / Wrong; Rob vs. Eslam: 3 / The "Mother of the Association" Melchora Aquino is also known by what nickname? / Tandang Sora (Elder Sora) / did not answer; 3 / How many people are in front of the one-thousand peso bill? / 3 (José Abad Santos, Vicente Lim, and Josefa Llanes Escoda) / Wrong / Correct; 3 / Who is the Philippine president featured on both the 20 peso bill and coin? / Manuel Quezon / Wrong / Correct; Kai vs. Gabb: 4 / What is Jose Rizal's famous nickname? / Pepe / Wrong / Correct; 4 / What is the name of the longest bridge in the Philippines? / San Juanico Bridge / Correct / Wrong; 4 / Who is the hero featured on the 5-peso coin? / Emilio Aguinaldo/Andres Bonifacio / Correct / Wrong; Tiebreaker Round Dustine vs. Ashton: 5 / Who made the famous painting Spolarium? / Juan Luna / Wrong / Correct; 5 / Give the titles of the two famous books written by Jose Rizal. / Noli Me Tángere and El Filibusterismo / Correct / Wrong; 5 / Called Walled City, this place is located in Manila. / Intramuros / Wrong / Correct; 5 / "Jasminum sambac" is better known by what Filipino name? / Sampaguita / Correct / Wrong; 5 / In what town in Laguna was Jose Rizal born? / Calamba, Laguna / Correct / Wrong; Final score / / / 3 / 2 / Won / Lost; 5 / April 8 (Day 175) / Language Class; Taught by English "major" teacher Melai, the housemates must accurately translate the proverbs or salawikain in English from Filipino. To answer, the five housemates must perform first a human table by laying down on each table and must crawl to the other side without falling; they should not cross the line. The first group to do this will get to answer first and once correct, will be given a point for their team. The group that gets two points first gets more additional materials for their weekly task. The result of Language Class task: Round No. / Proverb (in English) / Proverb (in Filipino) / Result; Round No. / Proverb (in English) / Proverb (in Filipino) / Team Dustine / Team Luke; Paolo vs. Ashton: 1 / If there's no patience, there's no beef stew. / Kapag walang tiyaga, walang nilaga. / did not answer; Kai vs. Gabb: 2 / Rock, rock in the sky, take cover, don't get angry. / Bato bato sa langit, ang matamaan, huwag magalit. / Correct / Wrong; Dustine vs. Tiff: 3 / If someone throws stones at you, throw back bread. / Kapag binato ka ng bato, batuhin mo ng tinapay. / Wrong / Correct; Tiebreaker Round Paolo vs. Tiff: 4 / If you plant... versus zombies, you harvest. / Kapag may tinanim, may aanihin. / Wrong / Correct; Final score / / / 1 / 2 / Lost / Won	Team Luke	Team Dustine

=== Kumuni-Test ===
To determine this season's Ultimate Big 5, each Kumunity will compete in a three-part challenge referred to as the KumuniTest. In each challenge, a certain number of points are put at stake; the winners of the first round will receive 25 points, the winners of the second round will receive 50 points and the winners of the final round will receive 75 points. More challenges may be implemented if there is ever a tie between the scores of two or more Kumunities. The Kumunity with the most points at the end of the challenges will automatically be part of the Big 5.

Challenge No.	Date given	Challenge title and description			
Challenge No.	Date given	Challenge title and description	Result		
Challenge No.	Date given	Challenge title and description	Celebrities	Adults	Teens
1	May 21 (Day 218)^{1}	The housemates must stack 12 layers of colored cups on their respective starting points. Once they stack their first layer, they must move their tray into the other point and stack the other layer there. They can then repeat this by stacking the other layers until all cups have been stacked. Two housemates will carry their tray while a housemate will stack their cups one at a time per point. Each Kumunity has a power to freeze another Kumunity of their choice in stacking their cups for one minute. The Kumunity that successfully stacks 12 layers of cups will get 25 Kumuni-Test points. Kumunity power usage: Kumunity / Celebrities / Adults / Teens; Used power on / Adults / Celebrities / Celebrities	Lost	Lost	Won
2	May 23 (Day 220)	Liftables; The housemates must try to shoot a number of balls as they can in 100 minutes (1 hour and 40 minutes) into the graphical eye's hole located above their respective colored boards that has different hole sizes. They must successfully shoot a ball to the said hole in order to score a point. As with the previous challenge, each Kumunity still has a power to freeze another Kumunity of their choice in shooting their balls for three minutes. The Kumunity that has the highest number of balls shoot will get 50 Kumuni-Test points. Final result: Kumunity / Celebrities / Adults / Teens; Points garnered / 0 / 3 / 7; Power usage / Unused / Unused / Unused	Lost	Lost	Won
3	May 25 (Day 222)^{2}	Tumba Table Tournament (English: Tippy Table Tournament); Inspired by the Tumba Table weekly task by the Celebrities, the three Kumunities must try to stack wooden blocks on a hanging table as they can possibly balance on a hanging table within two hours. The first player must carry a number of blocks as they can carry on a rod, which they must then transfer the rod to the second player while the first player walks through an obstacle course, which will then be transferred to the third player in which the second player must walk through a thin runway. Once finished, the third player (or all players when all blocks have been transferred) can then place the wooden blocks on a hanging table. The Kumunity that transfers the most number of blocks at the end of the challenge within two hours will be given 75 Kumuni-Test points. Scoreboard: Kumunity / Celebrities / Adults / Teens; Total no. of blocks placed / 30 / 20 / 16	Won	Lost	Lost
Tiebreaker Round
4	May 26 (Day 223)^{3}	The housemates must roll as many tennis balls as they can effectively roll on a wooden board in one hour. They must first build a bridge out of wooden boards on a slender wooden beam. They must then roll a tennis ball to a container situated at the end of the wooden beam once it has been completed. They must swap turns in playing when they hear a bell that indicates the switch. The Kumunity with the most balls placed after one hour wins and secures their Kumunity three positions in the Ultimate Big 5, while the other two spots will be determined through public voting. Scoreboard: Kumunity / Celebrities / Teens; Total no. of balls placed / 12 / 5	Won	Ineligible	Lost
Total points earned			75	0	75

Notes

1. Isabel was exempted from participating in this challenge as the Adults have four members and the challenge only needs three participating members.
2. Zach was exempted from participating in this challenge as the Adults have four members and the challenge only needs three participating members.
3. The Celebrities won the tiebreaker round, therefore their Kumunity secured the three out of five spots of the Ultimate Big 5. The remaining two spots would then be occupied by one housemate of the Adult and Teen Kumunities through open voting.

== Nomination history ==
=== Celebrities ===
Legend:

Head of Household
Immune
Saved thru veto, task, or safety challenge
Saved thru power usage
Automatic Nomination
Voluntary Exit
Green name Positive nomination

	#1	#2	#3	#4	#5	#6	#7	#8	#9	Top 2	Biga-10 Pasabog	Nominations Received
Eviction Day and Date	Day 22 Nov. 6	Day 29 Nov. 13	Day 36 Nov. 20	Day 43 Nov. 27	Day 51 Dec. 5	Day 57 Dec. 11	Day 64 Dec. 19	Day 71 Dec. 26	Day 77 Jan. 1	Day 78 Jan. 2	—	Nominations Received
Nomination Day and Date	Day 16; Oct. 31	Day 23; Nov. 7	Day 30; Nov. 14	Day 37; Nov. 21	Day 44; Nov. 28	Day 52; Dec. 6	Day 58; Dec. 12	Day 66; Dec. 21	Day 73; Dec. 27	—		Nominations Received
Anji	Karen; John	KD; Albie	Alexa; Benedix	Alexa; Kyle	Alexa; KD	No nominations	Brenda; Eian	KD; Alyssa	No nominations	Celebrity Top 2 (Exited; Day 78)		25 (2; +1)
Samantha	Chie; Kyle	Anji; Alexa	Benedix; TJ	Jordan; Kyle	TJ; Karen	No nominations	Alexa; Eian	Madam Inutz; Brenda	No nominations	Evicted (Day 77)	Celebrity Top 2 (Elevated; Day 197)	5 (3; +1)
Alyssa	John; Shanaia	KD; Albie	Chie; Karen	Anji; KD	Karen; KD	No nominations	Alexa; KD	Brenda; Samantha	No nominations	Celebrity Top 2 (Exited; Day 78)	Voluntarily Exited (Day 197)	3 (5)
Madam Inutz	KD; Karen	Albie; KD	Chie; Kyle	Anji; Kyle	Alexa; KD	No nominations	Alexa; Anji	Brenda; Samantha	No nominations	Evicted (Day 77)		1 (3; +1)
Brenda	John; Alexa	Albie; KD	Alexa; KD	Kyle; Jordan	Alexa; TJ	No nominations	KD; Alexa	Alyssa; Samantha	No nominations	Evicted (Day 77)		10 (5; +1)
Alexa	John; Shanaia	Albie; Anji	Anji; Brenda	Anji; Jordan	Benedix; Samantha	No nominations	Jordan; Brenda	Alyssa; Madam Inutz	Evicted (Day 71)			36 (1)
KD	Karen; John	Albie; Karen	Brenda; Karen	Kyle; Jordan	Karen; Brenda	No nominations	Brenda; Eian	Anji; Alexa	Evicted (Day 71)			37 (2; +1)
Jordan	Not in the House	Exempt	Kyle; Chie	Alexa; KD	Samantha; Alexa	No nominations	Alexa; Anji	Evicted (Day 65)				8
Eian	TJ; Anji	KD; Shanaia	KD; Shanaia	Anji; Jordan	TJ; Karen	No nominations	KD; Anji	Evicted (Day 65)				9
Shanaia	Chie; Alyssa	Albie; Alexa	Eian; Kyle	Kyle; Alexa	Karen; Benedix	No nominations	Evicted (Day 57)					7 (+1)
Benedix	Not in the House	Albie; Anji	KD; Anji	Kyle; Anji	TJ; Alexa	No nominations	Evicted (Day 57)					10 (+1)
Karen	KD; Anji	Albie; KD	Chie; Brenda	Kyle; Shanaia	Alyssa; Madam Inutz	Evicted (Day 51)						18
TJ	Anji; John	KD; Alexa	KD; Eian	Alexa; KD	Samantha; Karen	Evicted (Day 51)						10
Kyle	Shanaia; John	Benedix; Albie	Eian; KD	Anji; KD	Evicted (Day 43)							20
Chie	Alexa; John	Albie; Alexa	Benedix; Karen	Evicted (Day 36)								11
Albie	Exempt	Kyle; Eian	Evicted (Day 29)									19
John	KD; Alexa	Evicted (Day 22)										11
Notes	^{1}	^{2}	^{3}	^{4}	^{5}	^{5,} ^{6,} ^{7}	^{5,} ^{8,} ^{9,} ^{10}	^{5,} ^{11,} ^{12}	^{13}		^{14}	
Head(s) of Household	Brenda	TJ	Madam Inutz; Samantha	None	Anji	None			Challenge Score + Open Voting		Open Voting Closed	
Up for eviction	John; Karen; KD	Albie; Alexa; Anji; KD	Benedix; Chie; Eian; KD	Alexa; Anji; Kyle	Alexa; Karen; Samantha; TJ	Anji; Benedix; Brenda; KD; Madam Inutz; Samantha; Shanaia	Alexa; Anji; Brenda; Eian; Jordan; KD	Alexa; Anji; KD; Madam Inutz; Samantha	Challenge Score + Open Voting		Open Voting Closed	
Saved from eviction	KD; 45.04% Karen; 18.44%	Alexa; 17.09% KD; 16.08% Anji; 8.46%	KD; 17.35% Benedix; 16.83% Eian; 12.12%	Anji; 30.03% Alexa; 27.98%	Alexa; 36.95% Samantha; 28.03%	Brenda; Power to Save Madam Inutz; 17.54% Anji; 16.50% KD; 15.57% Samantha; 14.32%	Anji; 19.28% KD; 18.22% Alexa; 17.60% Brenda; 15.51%	Anji; 19.18% Madam Inutz; 18.92% Samantha; 17.98%	Alyssa; 22.63% Anji; 13.60%		Samantha; Recipient of Alyssa's Spot	
Evicted	John; 0.30%	Albie; 6.48%	Chie; 11.16%	Kyle; 22.25%	Karen; 16.42% TJ -3.05%	Shanaia; 13.02% Benedix; 8.66%	Jordan; 4.53% Eian; 2.72%	Alexa; 17.03% KD; 16.99%	Samantha; 13.53% Madam Inutz; 13.03% Brenda; 2.84%		No eviction	
Voluntary Exit	None										Alyssa	
References												

Notes

1. Albie was exempt from the nominations for being a new entrant. He entered the House on Day 12, four days before the first nomination night.
2. Jordan was exempt from the nominations for being a new entrant. He entered the House on Day 19, four days before the second nomination night.
3. Madam Inutz and Samantha both became the Heads of Household for the week after they tied in the challenge.
4. The group consisting of Benedix, Brenda, Eian, Karen and TJ won immunity after earning the most points in the Pinoy Big Brother Games 2021.
5. This eviction is a double eviction wherein two nominees were evicted.
6. The nominations for the sixth eviction was determined via a challenge between Yellow Team (Anji, Brenda, KD, Benedix, Madam Inutz, Samantha and Shanaia) and the Blue Team (Alyssa, Alexa, Jordan, TJ, Karen and Eian) wherein the Blue Team won and was declared safe. As nominees from the prior nominations, Alexa, Karen, and TJ may only be safe for this round of nominations if they were to be saved in the fifth eviction night.
7. Brenda used the Power to Save he won on Day 9 on herself for this round of nominations, removing himself from the list of nominees for that week.
8. For this week, the housemates had a face to face nomination unlike the previous nomination rounds.
9. Madam Inutz used her Nomination Immunity Pass for this round, giving her immunity for this week.
10. This nomination week is similar to All In season's All In nominations, wherein all housemates who received votes were up for eviction.
11. This nomination round had a positive nomination unlike the previous nomination rounds.
12. Alyssa and Brenda both became safe from nomination after they tied the most positive nomination points.
13. This week was the Final 5 week. The housemates competed for extra votes alongside the regular voting through the 10 Million Diamonds Challenge with the two housemates with the most total votes being named as their batch's Top 2. As a result, this week also featured a triple eviction.
14. On Day 197, it was announced that Alyssa would be relinquishing her spot on the Top 2. As a result, Samantha was named her replacement by virtue of having the next most votes.

==== Powers ====
On Day 16, as a reward for receiving the most diamonds in the preseason ambagan task, Alexa, Brenda and Eian received powers which could be used once until the seventh nomination night. The powers were given at random via covered stars; the recipient removed the covering to receive the power. Alexa received the Power to Automatically Nominate, enabling her to nominate a housemate of her choice for eviction. Brenda received the Power to Save, enabling her to save any nominee (including herself) from eviction. Eian received the Power to Contact Someone From the Outside World, enabling him to contact a loved one via a Kumu livestream, which he used on Day 53.

Madam Inutz received a Nomination Immunity Pass on Day 23 for winning the preseason Follower Spring task, enabling her to grant herself immunity for a nomination round of her choice. She used her power for the seventh round of nominations, guaranteeing her another week in the house by granting herself immunity.

=== Adults ===
Legend:

Head of Household
Immune
Saved thru veto, task, or safety challenge
Automatic Nomination

	#1	#2	#3	#4	#5	#6	Top 2	Nominations Received
Eviction Day and Date	Day 112 Feb. 5	Day 119 Feb. 12	Day 126 Feb. 19	Day 133 Feb. 26	Day 141 Mar. 6	Day 147 Mar. 12		Nominations Received
Nomination Day and Date	Day 106; Jan. 30	Day 113; Feb. 6	Day 120; Feb. 13	Day 127; Feb. 20	Day 134; Feb. 27	Day 142; Mar. 7	–	Nominations Received
Isabel	Laziz; Aleck	Aleck; Rica	Kathleen; Raf	Roque; Zach	No nominations	No nominations	Adult Top 2 (Exited; Day 147)	10 (+1)
Nathan	Thamara; Aleck	Aleck; Rica	Seham; Jaye	Zach; Seham	No nominations	No nominations	Adult Top 2 (Exited; Day 147)	4
Zach	Isabel; Raf	Nathan; Aleck	Nathan; Gin	Isabel; Roque	No nominations	No nominations	Evicted (Day 147)	14 (+1)
Michael Ver	Gin; Thamara	Kathleen; Gin	Kathleen; Zach	Kathleen; Laziz	No nominations	No nominations	Evicted (Day 147)	9
Seham	Jaye; Basti	Kathleen; Raf	Gin; Basti	Zach; Isabel	No nominations	No nominations	Evicted (Day 147)	5
Raf	Thamara; Aleck	Aleck; Basti	Basti; Zach	Michael Ver; Kathleen	No nominations	Evicted (Day 141)		6 (+1)
Laziz	Isabel; Thamara	Aleck; Basti	Zach; Seham	Michael Ver; Kathleen	No nominations	Evicted (Day 141)		13 (+1)
Roque	Laziz; Basti	Rica; Aleck	Jaye; Laziz	Isabel; Zach	Evicted (Day 133)			3 (+1)
Gin	Basti; Laziz	Aleck; Kathleen	Jaye; Basti	Michael Ver; Kathleen	Evicted (Day 133)			12
Kathleen	Jaye; Rica	Basti; Aleck	Basti; Laziz	Michael Ver; Gin	Evicted (Day 133)			24
Basti	Thamara; Seham	Kathleen; Gin	Kathleen; Gin	Evicted (Day 126)				14
Jaye	Thamara; Zach	Kathleen; Laziz	Kathleen; Raf	Evicted (Day 126)				11
Aleck	Gin; Zach	Kathleen; Gin	Evicted (Day 119)					16
Rica	Raf; Laziz	Zach; Laziz	Evicted (Day 119)					5
Andrei	Laziz; Isabel	Evicted (Day 112)						0 (+1)
Thamara	Jaye; Michael Ver	Evicted (Day 112)						10
Notes	^{1,} ^{2,} ^{3}	^{3,} ^{4}	^{3,} ^{5}	^{6,} ^{7,} ^{8,} ^{9}	^{3,} ^{10,} ^{11,} ^{12,} ^{13}	^{None}		
Head of Household	Nathan	None	Michael Ver	None		Challenge Score + Open Voting		
Ligtask Winners	None			Laziz; Michael Ver	None	Challenge Score + Open Voting		
Up for eviction	Andrei; Roque; Thamara	Aleck; Basti; Kathleen; Rica	Basti; Gin; Jaye; Kathleen; Zach	Gin; Isabel; Kathleen; Roque; Zach	Isabel; Laziz; Raf; Zach	Challenge Score + Open Voting		
Saved from eviction	Roque; 20.88%	Basti; 19.06% Kathleen; 11.75%	Zach; 16.88% Kathleen; 12.53% Gin; 11.37%	Isabel; 45.87% Zach; 24.23%	Isabel; 52.21% Zach; 26.68%	Isabel; 29.56% Nathan; 20.93%		
Evicted	Andrei; 18.69% Thamara; 9.36%	Aleck; 5.02% Rica; 4.55%	Basti; 10.07% Jaye; 2.00%	Roque; 7.63% Gin; 5.86% Kathleen; 3.40%	Raf; 6.17% Laziz; 4.42%	Zach; 19.43% Michael Ver; 6.83% Seham; 2.35%		
References								

Notes

1. For being elected as the last boss of their company for their weekly task, Kathleen was awarded immunity for this eviction.
2. As both Andrei and Roque failed to be elected as the boss of their company, thus failing in their weekly task resulting in their automatic nominations. Since there are two housemates that were both automatically nominated, only the highest-pointer will be included from the list of nominees for this week.
3. This eviction is a double eviction wherein two nominees are set to be evicted.
4. Andrei, Jaye, Michael Ver, and Roque won immunity after winning the twist given by Big Brother as part of the Battle of the Duos challenge. As nominees from the prior nominations, Andrei and Roque may only be safe for this round of nominations if they were to be saved in the first eviction night.
5. Isabel used her Nomination Immunity Pass for this round, giving her immunity for this week.
6. For this week, the housemates had a face to face nomination unlike the previous nomination rounds.
7. This nomination round was divided into two groups; Team GinWin and Team RoQueens from the PBB Drag Race weekly task. Each housemate must be nominate a fellow member of their team.
8. Nathan used his Nomination Immunity Pass for this round, giving him immunity for this week.
9. This eviction is a triple eviction wherein three nominees are set to be evicted.
10. Since almost all of them had left during the special nomination process, as the housemates that still stayed in the activity area after Big Brother announced his offer, Michael Ver and Nathan claimed the first two spots of the Final Five.
11. Even though there was a special nomination process in this round of nominations, all nominations given there were declared void.
12. Seham was exempt for this eviction after she claimed the third Final Five spot.
13. Isabel, Laziz, Raf, and Zach were given an automatic nomination after they failed to claim the third spot of the Final Five that was based on the task given to them by Big Brother.

==== Special nomination process ====
Housemate	Rounds			Nominations Received
Housemate	1	2	3	Nominations Received
Isabel	Laziz; Zach	Left Activity Area		0
Laziz	Isabel; Nathan	Left Activity Area		1
Michael Ver	Raf; Zach	Raf; Zach	Raf; Zach	4
Seham	Laziz; Isabel	Left Activity Area		0
Zach	Michael Ver; Nathan	Left Activity Area		0
Raf	Michael Ver; Zach	Left Activity Area		2
Nathan	Michael Ver; Laziz	Michael Ver	Finished	0

Legend

Final Five member
Finished shooting all balls; nomination is valid
Failed to shoot all balls; nomination is invalid

For housemates that only placed one ball during a round
Green name Ball was placed in the housemates' chosen container; nomination valid
Red name No ball was placed in the housemates' chosen container, nomination invalid

=== Teens ===
Legend:

Head of Household
Immune
Saved thru veto, task, or safety challenge
Automatic Nomination

	#1	#2	#3	#4	#5	#6	#7	Top 2	Nominations Received
Eviction Day and Date	Day 169 Apr. 3	Day 176 Apr. 10	Day 183 Apr. 17	Day 190 Apr. 24	Day 197 May 1	Day 205 May 8	Day 210 May 14		Nominations Received
Nomination Day and Date	Day 162; Mar. 27	Day 170; Apr. 4	Day 177; Apr. 11	Day 184; Apr. 18	Day 191; Apr. 25	Day 202; May 6	Day 206; May 10	—	Nominations Received
Rob	Paolo; Don	Paolo; Luke	No nominations	Paolo; Luke	Luke; Gabb	No nominations	No nominations	Teen Top 2 (Day 210)	30 (+2)
Gabb	Stephanie; Don	Kai; Rob	No nominations	Stephanie; Rob	Stephanie; Dustine	No nominations	No nominations	Teen Top 2 (Day 210)	3
Stephanie	Don; Rob	Rob; Tiff	No nominations	Ashton; Rob	Luke; Gabb	No nominations	No nominations	Evicted (Day 210)	19 (+2)
Maxine	Stef; Kai	Kai; Stephanie	No nominations	Stephanie; Luke	Luke; Stephanie	No nominations	No nominations	Evicted (Day 210)	1 (+1)
Paolo	Rob; Stephanie	Kai; Stephanie	No nominations	Rob; Ashton	Eslam; Luke	No nominations	No nominations	Evicted (Day 210)	15
Tiff	Stef; Paolo	Stephanie; Eslam	No nominations	Luke; Eslam	Eslam; Luke	No nominations	Evicted (Day 204)		5 (+1)
Dustine	Rob; Don	Rob; Ashton	No nominations	Ashton; Stephanie	Tiff; Gabb	No nominations	Evicted (Day 204)		4 (+1)
Eslam	Kai; Stef	Paolo; Kai	No nominations	Paolo; Rob	Luke; Stephanie	Evicted (Day 197)			11
Luke	Kai; Rob	Rob; Stephanie	No nominations	Paolo; Dustine	Dustine; Eslam	Evicted (Day 197)			15
Ashton	Rob; Don	Rob; Kai	No nominations	Paolo; Eslam	Evicted (Day 190)				6
Stef	Eslam; Rob	Rob; Eslam	No nominations	Evicted (Day 183)					5 (+1)
Kai	Tiff; Stephanie	Rob; Maxine	Evicted (Day 176)						13
Don	Rob; Stephanie	Evicted (Day 169)							6
Notes	^{None}		^{1}	^{None}	^{2,} ^{3,} ^{4,} ^{5}	^{5,} ^{6}	^{7,} ^{8}		
Head of Household	Maxine	Stef	None	Tiff	None		Challenge Score + Open Voting		
Up for eviction	Don; Kai; Rob; Stef; Stephanie	Kai; Rob; Stephanie	Rob; Stef; Stephanie	Ashton; Paolo; Rob; Stephanie	Dustine; Eslam; Gabb; Luke; Stephanie	Dustine; Maxine; Rob; Stephanie; Tiff	Challenge Score + Open Voting		
Saved from eviction	Rob; 34.71% Stef; 16.58% Kai; 12.05% Stephanie; 8.09%	Rob; 34.75% Stephanie; 18.91%	Rob; 27.33% Stephanie; 16.54%	Rob; 28.84% Paolo; 17.31% Stephanie; 13.56%	Stephanie; 20.75% Gabb; 16.66% Dustine; 11.08%	Maxine; 25.38% Rob; 24.17% Stephanie; 15.58%	Rob; 27.10% Gabb; 22.34%		
Evicted	Don; 2.09%	Kai; 17.22%	Stef; 14.39%	Ashton; 12.38%	Eslam; 8.22% Luke; 3.31%	Tiff; 12.16% Dustine; 5.14%	Stephanie; 16.71% Maxine; 15.42% Paolo; 11.06%		
References									

Notes

1. For winning the PBB University group challenge, Team Luke, consisting of its namesake, Ashton, Eslam, Gabb, Maxine, and Tiff were awarded immunity for the week. On the other hand, Team Dustine, consisting of its namesake, Paolo, Rob, Stef, and Stephanie decided that week's nominees.
2. For this week, the housemates had a face to face nomination unlike the previous nomination rounds.
3. Gabb gave her Nomination Immunity Pass to Paolo, giving him immunity for this week's nomination.
4. Maxine and Rob won immunity after winning the most Vote to Save face-to-face nomination.
5. This eviction is a double eviction wherein two nominees are set to be evicted.
6. Paolo and Gabb secured their first two Final Five slot after defending their spot to Tiff and Dustine, the challengers.
7. Rob and Gabb did not leave the house. They will be joined by the Top 2 of each batch.
8. Stephanie and Maxine did not leave on Day 210. As the next two highest voters, they were the comeback housemates in the teen batch.

=== Biga-10 ===
In the season's final batch, the top two from each batch returned to the house. Each housemate's Kumunity is reflected by color in the legend box below.

Legend of batch colors:

Celebrity housemate
Adult housemate
Teen housemate

Legend by status:

Winner
Runner-up
Finalist
Immune
Automatic Nomination
Comeback Housemate

	Biga-10 Comeback		KumuniTest	Big Night
	#1	#2	#3	Big Night
Eviction Day and Date	Day 216 May 20	Day 217 May 21	Day 225 May 28	Day 226 May 29
Nomination Day and Date	—		Day 224; May 27	Day 225; May 28
Anji	No nominations	No nominations	Finalist	Winner
Isabel	No nominations	No nominations	No nominations	Runner-up
Samantha	No nominations	No nominations	Finalist	3rd Place
Rob	No nominations	No nominations	No nominations	4th Place
Brenda	Comeback housemate		Finalist	5th Place
Stephanie	Comeback housemate		No nominations	Re-evicted (Day 225)
Gabb	No nominations	No nominations	No nominations	Evicted (Day 225)
Zach	Comeback housemate	No nominations	No nominations	Re-evicted (Day 225)
Nathan	No nominations	No nominations	No nominations	Evicted (Day 225)
Michael Ver	Comeback housemate	No nominations	No nominations	Re-evicted (Day 225)
Comeback Housemates
Madam Inutz	Comeback housemate		Re-evicted (Day 217)	
Maxine	Comeback housemate		Re-evicted (Day 216)	
Notes	^{1}	^{2}	^{3,} ^{4}	^{None}
Up for eviction	All Comeback Housemates	Maxine; Stephanie Brenda; Madam Inutz	Isabel; Nathan; Michael Ver; Zach Gabb; Rob; Stephanie	Open Voting
Saved	Michael Ver; Zach; Won campaign	Stephanie; Won challenge Brenda; Won challenge	Isabel; 52.84% Rob; 43.37%	Anji; 40.42%
Evicted	Brenda; Madam Inutz; Maxine; Stephanie; Lost campaign	Maxine; Lost challenge Madam Inutz; Lost challenge	Zach; 21.51% Nathan; 20.66% Michael Ver; 3.47% Stephanie; 22.84% Gabb; 14.85%	Isabel; 18.20% Samantha; 16.28% Rob; 4.01% Brenda; 1.19%
References				

Notes

1. The comeback housemates in each Kumunity competed in a campaign to determine the holders of the seventh and eighth spots in the Biga-10.
2. The remaining comeback housemates in each Kumunity competed against each other to determine the holders of the final spots in the Biga-10. The first Kumunity to compete were the Teens, who were then followed by the Celebrities.
3. The Biga10 housemates are competing in a series of competitions referred to as the KumuniTest to determine this season's Ultimate Big 5. The Kumunity with the most points at the end of the KumuniTests will automatically be part of the Big 5. The losing Kumunities will face the public vote to determine the fourth and fifth members of the Big 5.
4. This eviction is a mass eviction wherein four or more nominees are set to be evicted.

=== S-E voting system results ===
==== Celebrities ====
Eviction No.	Nominee	Votes			Result	Refs.
Eviction No.	Nominee	To-Save	To-Evict	Net Total	Result	Refs.
1	John	12.12%	-11.82%	0.30%	Evicted	
1	Karen	23.55%	-5.11%	18.44%	Saved	
1	KD	46.22%	-1.18%	45.04%	Saved	
2	Albie	20.45%	-13.97%	6.48%	Evicted	
2	Alexa	17.50%	-0.41%	17.09%	Saved	
2	Anji	19.77%	-11.31%	8.46%	Saved	
2	KD	16.34%	-0.26%	16.08%	Saved	
3	Benedix	23.05%	-6.22%	16.83%	Saved	
3	Chie	16.38%	-5.22%	11.16%	Evicted	
3	Eian	21.70%	-9.58%	12.12%	Saved	
3	KD	17.59%	-0.24%	17.35%	Saved	
4	Alexa	28.22%	-0.24%	27.98%	Saved	
4	Anji	33.39%	-3.36%	30.03%	Saved	
4	Kyle	28.52%	-6.27%	22.25%	Evicted	
5	Alexa	39.14%	-2.19%	36.95%	Saved	
5	Karen	18.11%	-1.69%	16.42%	Evicted	
5	Samantha	30.67%	-2.64%	28.03%	Saved	
5	TJ	1.25%	-4.30%	-3.05%	Evicted	
6	Anji	17.95%	-1.45%	16.50%	Saved	
6	Benedix	9.03%	-0.37%	8.66%	Evicted	
6	KD	16.47%	-0.90%	15.57%	Saved	
6	Madam Inutz	19.71%	-2.17%	17.54%	Saved	
6	Samantha	16.25%	-1.93%	14.32%	Saved	
6	Shanaia	13.40%	-0.38%	13.02%	Evicted	
7	Alexa	22.22%	-4.62%	17.60%	Saved	
7	Anji	19.43%	-0.15%	19.28%	Saved	
7	Brenda	20.66%	-5.15%	15.51%	Saved	
7	Eian	3.61%	-0.89%	2.72%	Evicted	
7	Jordan	4.72%	-0.19%	4.53%	Evicted	
7	KD	18.29%	-0.07%	18.22%	Saved	
8	Alexa	20.26%	-3.23%	17.03%	Evicted	
8	Anji	19.58%	-0.40%	19.18%	Saved	
8	KD	17.10%	-0.11%	16.99%	Evicted	
8	Madam Inutz	19.27%	-0.35%	18.92%	Saved	
8	Samantha	18.84%	-0.86%	17.98%	Saved	
9	Alyssa	22.69%	-0.06%	22.63%	Finalist	
9	Anji	19.21%	-5.61%	13.60%	Finalist	
9	Brenda	4.19%	-1.35%	2.84%	Evicted	
9	Madam Inutz	18.44%	-5.41%	13.03%	Evicted	
9	Samantha	18.29%	-4.76%	13.53%	Evicted	

==== Adults ====
Eviction No.	Nominee	Votes			Result	Refs.
Eviction No.	Nominee	To-Save	To-Evict	Net Total	Result	Refs.
1	Andrei	30.89%	-12.20%	18.69%	Evicted	
1	Roque	32.11%	-11.23%	20.88%	Saved	
1	Thamara	11.47%	-2.11%	9.36%	Evicted	
2	Aleck	10.98%	-5.96%	5.02%	Evicted	
2	Basti	19.65%	-0.59%	19.06%	Saved	
2	Kathleen	30.53%	-18.78%	11.75%	Saved	
2	Rica	19.15%	-14.60%	4.55%	Evicted	
3	Basti	19.36%	-9.29%	10.07%	Evicted	
3	Gin	20.05%	-8.68%	11.37%	Saved	
3	Jaye	2.26%	-0.26%	2.00%	Evicted	
3	Kathleen	17.64%	-5.11%	12.53%	Saved	
3	Zach	17.12%	-0.24%	16.88%	Saved	
4	Gin	6.59%	-0.73%	5.86%	Evicted	
4	Isabel	46.08%	-0.21%	45.87%	Saved	
4	Kathleen	6.51%	-3.11%	3.40%	Evicted	
4	Roque	8.35%	-0.72%	7.63%	Evicted	
4	Zach	25.96%	-1.73%	24.23%	Saved	
5	Isabel	52.40%	-0.19%	52.21%	Saved	
5	Laziz	4.58%	-0.16%	4.42%	Evicted	
5	Raf	9.68%	-3.51%	6.17%	Evicted	
5	Zach	28.08%	-1.40%	26.68%	Saved	
6	Isabel	29.65%	-0.09%	29.56%	Finalist	
6	Michael Ver	9.16%	-2.33%	6.83%	Evicted	
6	Nathan	24.27%	-3.34%	20.93%	Finalist	
6	Seham	2.52%	-0.17%	2.35%	Evicted	
6	Zach	23.95%	-4.52%	19.43%	Evicted	

==== Teens ====
Eviction No.	Nominee	Votes			Result	Refs.
Eviction No.	Nominee	To-Save	To-Evict	Net Total	Result	Refs.
1	Don	9.00%	-6.91%	2.09%	Evicted	
1	Kai	12.61%	-0.56%	12.05%	Saved	
1	Rob	35.23%	-0.52%	34.71%	Saved	
1	Stef	17.75%	-1.17%	16.58%	Saved	
1	Stephanie	12.16%	-4.07%	8.09%	Saved	
2	Kai	23.67%	-6.45%	17.22%	Evicted	
2	Rob	35.92%	-1.17%	34.75%	Saved	
2	Stephanie	25.85%	-6.94%	18.91%	Saved	
3	Rob	27.72%	-0.39%	27.33%	Saved	
3	Stef	24.35%	-9.96%	14.39%	Evicted	
3	Stephanie	27.06%	-10.52%	16.54%	Saved	
4	Ashton	19.71%	-7.33%	12.38%	Evicted	
4	Paolo	18.06%	-0.75%	17.31%	Saved	
4	Rob	29.28%	-0.44%	28.84%	Saved	
4	Stephanie	19.00%	-5.44%	13.56%	Saved	
5	Dustine	12.92%	-1.84%	11.08%	Saved	
5	Eslam	9.13%	-0.91%	8.22%	Evicted	
5	Gabb	28.71%	-12.05%	16.66%	Saved	
5	Luke	5.50%	-2.19%	3.31%	Evicted	
5	Stephanie	23.75%	-3.00%	20.75%	Saved	
6	Dustine	5.77%	-0.63%	5.14%	Evicted	
6	Maxine	26.37%	-0.99%	25.38%	Saved	
6	Rob	25.71%	-1.54%	24.17%	Saved	
6	Stephanie	18.78%	-3.20%	15.58%	Saved	
6	Tiff	14.59%	-2.43%	12.16%	Evicted	
7	Gabb	23.38%	-1.04%	22.34%	Finalist	
7	Maxine	16.60%	-1.18%	15.42%	Evicted	
7	Paolo	11.30%	-0.24%	11.06%	Evicted	
7	Rob	27.44%	-0.34%	27.10%	Finalist	
7	Stephanie	17.59%	-0.88%	16.71%	Evicted	

==== Biga-10 ====
Eviction No.	Nominee	Votes			Result	Refs.
Eviction No.	Nominee	To-Save	To-Evict	Net Total	Result	Refs.
1	Isabel	53.05%	-0.21%	52.84%	Finalist	
1	Michael Ver	3.58%	-0.11%	3.47%	Evicted	
1	Nathan	20.92%	-0.26%	20.66%	Evicted	
1	Zach	21.69%	-0.18%	21.51%	Evicted	
1	Gabb	15.33%	-0.48%	14.85%	Evicted	
1	Rob	45.52%	-2.05%	43.37%	Finalist	
1	Stephanie	29.73%	-6.89%	22.84%	Evicted	

== Biga10 na Big Night ==
The season finale, Biga10 Na Big Night, was held on May 29, 2022, at ABS-CBN Studios in Quezon City. It included performances by P-pop groups BGYO and BINI, Connect finalists Kobie Brown and Andi Abaya, and 1MX London 2022 artists Bamboo, Ez Mil, Jeremy Glinoga, KZ Tandingan and SAB (also known as Sabine Cerrado). Throughout the Biga-10's stay in the house, a competition was held on Kumu to choose a user to perform on the finale.

=== Results ===
Finalist		Votes			Result	Refs.
Finalist		To-Save	To-Evict	Net	Result	Refs.
A	Isabel	18.85%	-0.65%	18.20%	2nd Big Placer	
B	Brenda	1.22%	-0.03%	1.19%	5th Big Placer	
C	Samantha	19.32%	-3.04%	16.28%	3rd Big Placer	
D	Anji	46.56%	-6.15%	40.41%	Ultimate Big Winner	
E	Rob	4.10%	-0.09%	4.01%	4th Big Placer	

== Big Homecoming ==
Pinoy Big Brother: Kumunity Season 10 - Big Homecoming, a three-episode miniseries, began a week after the Big Night. Hosted by Bianca Gonzalez and Robi Domingo, it consisted of interviews with the Final Five of each Kumunity about the three editions' highlights and their experiences in the house during the season. The first episode was from the Teen Kumunity; The second was from the Adult Kumunity, and the third was from the Celebrity Kumunity.

== Reception ==
=== Praise ===
During the season's celebrity edition, a dialogue began on the air and online, about the housemates' mental-health issues. With the help of the show's resident psychiatrist Randy Dellosa, mental-health conditions addressed included KD Estrada's anxiety, Albie Casiño's attention deficit hyperactivity disorder, Alexa Ilacad's body dysmorphia, and the housemates' response to thoe diagnosed with such conditions. Since such conversations remain taboo in Filipino society, the dialogue was praised for normalizing mental-health-related conversations.

=== Controversy ===
Two days before the end of voting during the celebrity edition's second nomination week, the producers decided to remove the Kumu voting limit of 10 votes per account per day. The move was criticized by viewers, and Albie Casiño became the second evictee. Executive producer and director Lauren Dyogi tweeted that they "initially planned it for the first nomination week but it didn't push through because of technical issues."

Brenda Mage was criticized by viewers for telling an inappropriate joke to Eian Rances. Michael Ver Comaling was criticized for reportedly talking negatively about Juane siblings Nathan and Raf behind their backs.

Houseplayer Marky Miranda was criticized for confronting housemates Comaling and Zach Guerrero after drinking. The following day, all three apologized.

Stephanie Jordan criticized Rob Blackburn for reportedly shouting at fellow housemate Kai Espenido. Jordan's frankness was praised, but her insensitivity was criticized. During the fifth round of nominations, Gabb Skribikin was criticized for insensitivity to Jordan. Both Jordan and Skribikin were saved from eviction by the end of the week, with Jordan topping the polls after four consecutive second-to-last finishes.

TJ Valderrama was seen by live-feed viewers touching and looking at Shanaia Gomez in an allegedly-sexual manner. Gabriela Women's Party, a left-wing Filipino political party which advocates for women's rights, released a statement about the issue. The producers and the housemates agreed to moderate their behavior. Valderrama, evicted on Day 51, was the season's only housemate to receive a negative vote tally.

Gabb Skribikin and Kai Espenido were criticized on social media for incorrectly answering a question about the collective nickname of three Filipino priests executed during the Spanish colonial period (Mariano Gomez, Jose Burgos and Jacinto Zamora, known as Gomburza) during their History Quiz Bee. Skribikin was also criticized for answering "SLEX" to a question about the San Juanico Bridge. Viewers called the incorrect answers a symptom of the Philippines' poor educational system. Host Robi Domingo, who asked the history questions, tweeted his disappointment several days after the quiz bee trended on social media: "Sa una, nakakatawa pero habang tumatagal, di na nakakatuwa. Sana maging daan ito para makita kung ano ang kakulangan sa sistema ng ating edukasyon. Sa lahat ng content creators, let's battle #MaJoHa." ("At first, it's funny but as time passes by, it's not amusing anymore. I hope this will be a way to shed light on the gaps in our education system. To all content creators, let's battle #MaJoHa.")

A teaser for the Big Homecoming with a spoof of celebrity ex-housemates KD Estrada and Anji Salvacion's confrontation during the Celebrity Edition was posted and later deleted. The spoof was by Teen Edition Plus runner-up and host Robi Domingo and Lucky 7 winner Maymay Entrata playing Estrada and Salvacion, respectively. Former Otso housemate Wakim Regalado, who also has depression, tweeted that he "rebukes Pinoy Big Brother's insensitive and irresponsible move to trivialize and make fun of Estrada's experience."

Preceded by Connect	Pinoy Big Brother: Kumunity Season 10 (October 16, 2021–May 29, 2022)	Succeeded by Gen 11
