= Cabinet of the Philippines =

Advisory body to the President of the Philippines

Cabinet of the Republic of the Philippines
- Great Seal of the Philippines

Cabinet overview
- Formed: January 21, 1899 (127 years ago)
- Type: Advisory body
- Headquarters: Malacañang Palace, Manila
- Cabinet executives: Bongbong Marcos, President of the Philippines; Ralph Recto, Executive Secretary; Benhur Abalos, Cabinet Secretary; Elaine Masukat, Chief of the Presidential Management Staff; Lino Cayetano, Secretary of the Presidential Communications Office; Antonio Lagdameo Jr., Special Assistant to the President; Anna Liza G. Logan, Chief Presidential Legal Counsel; Joey Salceda, Secretary of the Presidential Legislative Liaison Office
- Website: www.gov.ph

The Cabinet of the Philippines (Filipino: Gabinete ng Pilipinas, usually referred to as the Cabinet or Gabinete) consists of the heads of the largest part of the executive branch of the national government of the Philippines. Currently, it includes the secretaries of 23 executive departments and the heads of other several other minor agencies and offices that are subordinate to the president of the Philippines.

The cabinet secretaries are tasked to advise the president on the different affairs of the state such as agriculture, budget, energy, finance, education, social welfare, national defense, and foreign policy.

They are nominated by the president and then presented to the Commission on Appointments, a body of the Congress of the Philippines that confirms all appointments made by the president, for confirmation or rejection. If the presidential appointees are approved, they are sworn into office, receive the title "Secretary", and begin to function their duties.

== Constitutional and legal basis ==
=== Appointment ===
Article 7, Section 16 of the Constitution of the Philippines says that the President:

shall nominate and, with the consent of the Commission on Appointments, appoint the heads of the executive departments, ambassadors, other public ministers and consuls, or officers of the armed forces from the rank of colonel or naval captain, and other officers whose appointments are vested in him in this Constitution. He shall also appoint all other officers of the Government whose appointments are not otherwise provided for by law, and those whom he may be authorized by law to appoint. The Congress may, by law, vest the appointment of other officers lower in rank in the President alone, in the courts, or in the heads of departments, agencies, commissions, or boards.

== Cabinet and cabinet-level officials ==
The people listed below form the cabinet and are the heads of the current executive departments of the Philippines. The officials under these departments are appointed with the rank of Secretary. Appointed officials who are not confirmed by the Commission on Appointments, as required by law, will take the office under acting capacity, or as officer-in-charge, depending on the appointment released and approved by the President. The current structure of the Cabinet of the Philippines are based on the executive orders reorganizing the offices under its jurisdiction, given the fact that the Constitution allows executive privileges to reorganize its structure.

Official Filipino names of the agencies were derived from Komisyon sa Wikang Filipino and Department of Budget and Management.

=== Executive departments and offices ===
Marcos Jr. Cabinet
Incumbent	Office	Department (Constituting instrument)	Acronym	Department establishment date	Took office
Ralph Recto; Ad interim	Executive Secretary	Office of the Executive Secretary (Executive Order No. 292, s. 1987)	OES	October 12, 1936	November 17, 2025
Benhur Abalos	Cabinet Secretary	Cabinet Secretariat (Executive Order No. 237, s. 1987)		December 22, 1986	July 8, 2026
Tess Lazaro	Secretary of Foreign Affairs	Foreign Affairs (Commonwealth Act No. 732)	DFA	June 23, 1898	July 1, 2025
Frederick Go; Ad interim	Secretary of Finance	Finance (Executive Order No. 292, s. 1987)	DOF	April 24, 1897	November 17, 2025
Gilbert Teodoro	Secretary of National Defense	National Defense (Commonwealth Act No. 1)	DND	November 1, 1939	June 5, 2023
Fredderick Vida; Ad interim	Secretary of Justice	Justice (Executive Order No. 292, s. 1987)	DOJ	April 17, 1897	October 10, 2025
Jonvic Remulla	Secretary of the Interior and Local Government	Interior and Local Government (Republic Act No. 6975)	DILG	March 22, 1897	October 8, 2024
Francisco Tiu Laurel Jr.	Secretary of Agriculture	Agriculture (Presidential Decree No. 461, s. 1974)	DA	June 23, 1898	November 3, 2023
Cristina Aldeguer-Roque	Secretary of Trade and Industry	Trade and Industry (Executive Order No. 133, s. 1987)	DTI	December 8, 1933	August 2, 2024
Francis Tolentino; Ad interim	Secretary of Labor and Employment	Labor and Employment (Executive Order No. 292, s. 1987)	DOLE	December 8, 1933	May 25, 2026
Dr. Edwin M. Mercado; Ad interim	Secretary of Health	Health (Executive Order No. 94, s. 1947)	DOH	September 10, 1898	August 10, 2026
Jose Ramon Aliling	Secretary of Human Settlements and Urban Development	Human Settlements and Urban Development (Republic Act No. 11201)	DHSUD	February 14, 2019	May 23, 2025
Vince Dizon; Ad interim	Secretary of Transportation	Transportation (Republic Act No. 10844)	DOTr	January 23, 1899	October 26, 2026
Sharon Garin	Secretary of Energy	Energy (Republic Act No. 7638)	DOE	December 9, 1992	May 23, 2025
Sonny Angara	Secretary of Education	Education (Republic Act No. 9155)	DepEd	June 23, 1898	July 19, 2024
Juan Miguel T. Cuna; Ad interim	Secretary of Environment and Natural Resources	Environment and Natural Resources (Presidential Decree No. 461, s. 1974)	DENR	January 1, 1917	March 6, 2026
Kim Robert de Leon; Ad interim	Secretary of Budget and Management	Budget and Management (Presidential Decree No. 1405, s. 1978)	DBM	April 25, 1936	November 17, 2025
Renato Solidum Jr.	Secretary of Science and Technology	Science and Technology (Executive Order No. 128, s. 1987)	DOST	June 13, 1958	July 22, 2022
Conrado Estrella III	Secretary of Agrarian Reform	Agrarian Reform (Republic Act No. 6657)	DAR	September 10, 1971	June 30, 2022
Dita Angara-Mathay; Ad interim	Secretary of Tourism	Tourism (Executive Order No. 120, s. 1987)	DOT	May 11, 1973	April 10, 2026
Rex Gatchalian	Secretary of Social Welfare and Development	Social Welfare and Development (Presidential Decree No. 994, s. 1976)	DSWD	November 1, 1939	January 31, 2023
Giovanni Z. Lopez; Ad interim	Secretary of Public Works and Highways	Public Works and Highways (Executive Order No. 124-A, s. 1987)	DPWH	June 23, 1898	October 26, 2026
Robert Joseph Montes de Claro; Ad interim	Secretary of Information and Communications Technology	Information and Communications Technology (Republic Act No. 10844)	DICT	June 9, 2016	October 13, 2026
Hans Cacdac	Secretary of Migrant Workers	Migrant Workers (Republic Act No. 11641)	DMW	February 3, 2022	August 20, 2024
Arsenio Balisacan	Secretary of Economy, Planning and Development	Economy, Planning and Development (Republic Act No. 12145)	DEPDev	December 23, 1935	June 30, 2022
Lino Cayetano; Ad interim	Secretary of the Presidential Communications Office	Presidential Communications Office (Executive Order No. 4, s. 2010)	PCO	August 9, 2010	October 13, 2026
Eduardo Oban	National Security Adviser	National Security Council (Executive Order No. 330, s. 1950)	NSC	July 1, 1950	January 14, 2023
Erwin Santa Ana	Office of Economic Affairs	Office of Economic Affairs (Executive Order No. 108)	OEA		
Elaine Masukat	Secretary of the Presidential Management Staff	Presidential Management (Executive Order No. 250, s. 1970)	PMS	July 29, 1970	January 3, 2023
Anna Liza Logan	Chief Presidential Legal Counsel	Office of the Chief Presidential Legal Counsel (Executive Order No. 152, s. 2004)	OCPLC	1992	December 16, 2025
Andres Centino	Presidential Assistant for Maritime Concerns	Presidential Office for Maritime Concerns (Executive Order No. 57, s. 2024)	POMC		September 28, 2023
Jose Acuzar	Presidential Adviser for Pasig River Rehabilitation	Inter-Agency Council for Pasig River Urban Development (Executive Order No. 35, s. 2023)	IACPRUD		May 23, 2025
Mel Senen Sarmiento	Presidential Adviser on Peace, Reconciliation and Unity	Office of the Presidential Adviser on Peace, Reconciliation and Unity (Executive Order No. 125, s. 1993)	OPAPRU	September 15, 1993	June 26, 2023
Larry Gadon	Presidential Adviser for Poverty Alleviation	Office of the Presidential Adviser for Poverty Alleviation (Administrative Order No. 6, s. 1998)	OPAPA		June 26, 2023
Philip Lo	Presidential Assistant for the Visayas	Office of the Presidential Assistant for the Visayas (Memorandum Order No. 8, s. 2016)	OPAV		July 8, 2026
Antonio Cerilles	Presidential Adviser for Mindanao Concerns	Office of the Presidential Adviser for Mindanao Concerns	OPMC		March 13, 2025
Antonio Lagdameo Jr.	Special Assistant to the President	Office of the Special Assistant to the President (Executive Order No. 1, s. 2016)	OSAP	June 30, 2016	June 30, 2022
Darlene Berberabe	Solicitor General	Office of the Solicitor General of the Philippines (Act No. 136)	OSG	June 6, 1901	May 29, 2025
Joey Salceda	Secretary of the Presidential Legislative Liaison Office	Presidential Legislative Liaison Office (Memorandum Order No. 128, s. 1987)	PLLO	November 11, 1987	July 20, 2026

=== Agencies, authorities, and offices under the Office of the President of the Philippines ===
The following officials are appointed to the following agencies under the supervision of the Office of the President of the Philippines (OP). The current structure of these agencies and offices is based on Executive Order No. 1, s. 2022, wherein all agencies and offices under and attached to OP as their parent agency shall be under the supervision and control of the Office of Executive Secretary (Section 5). Meanwhile, officials under these agencies and offices can either have a rank of secretary or undersecretary, and therefore are permitted to attend Cabinet meetings for special purposes.

Incumbent	Office	Department	Acronym	Establishment date	In office since
Ernesto Perez	Director-General of the Anti-Red Tape Authority	Anti-Red Tape Authority	ARTA	May 28, 2018	November 14, 2022
Mohammed Hussein Pangandaman	Chairperson and Administrator of the Authority of the Freeport Area of Bataan	Authority of the Freeport Area of Bataan	AFAB	July 2010	May 15, 2023
Hilario B. Paredes	Chairperson of the Bases Conversion and Development Authority	Bases Conversion and Development Authority	BCDA	March 13, 1992	October 29, 2024
Katrina Ponce Enrile	Administrator and CEO of Cagayan Economic Zone Authority	Cagayan Economic Zone Authority	CEZA	February 24, 1995	June 7, 2023
Robert E. A. Borje	Vice Chairperson and Executive Director of the Climate Change Commission	Climate Change Commission	CCC		March 8, 2022
Shirley Agrupis	Chairperson of the Commission on Higher Education	Commission on Higher Education	CHED	May 18, 1994	May 29, 2025
Dante Ang II	Chairperson of the Commission on Filipinos Overseas	Commission on Filipinos Overseas	CFO	June 16, 1980	October 25, 2024
Marites Barrios-Taran	Chairman of the Commission on the Filipino Language	Commission on the Filipino Language	KWF	November 13, 1936	August 7, 2025
Jaime C. Laya	Chairperson of the Cultural Center of the Philippines	Cultural Center of the Philippines	CCP	September 1966	June 30, 2022
Oscar F. Valenzuela	Chairperson of the Dangerous Drugs Board	Dangerous Drugs Board	DDB	November 14, 1971	
Jose Javier Reyes	Chairperson of the Film Development Council of the Philippines	Film Development Council of the Philippines	FDCP	June 7, 2002	April 8, 2024
Francisco Rivera	Chairman of the Games and Amusement Board	Games and Amusements Board	GAB	1951	June 13, 2024
Regalado Trota José	Chairperson of the National Historical Commission of the Philippines	National Historical Commission of the Philippines	NHCP	1933	
Romando Artes	Chairman of the Metropolitan Manila Development Authority	Metropolitan Manila Development Authority	MMDA	November 5, 1975	September 24, 2024
Elpidio J. Vega	Chairman of the Metropolitan Waterworks and Sewerage System	Metropolitan Waterworks and Sewerage System	MWSS	June 19, 1971	
Leo Magno	Chairperson of the Mindanao Development Authority	Mindanao Development Authority	MinDA	February 17, 2010	
Lala Sotto	Chairperson of the Movie and Television Review and Classification Board	Movie and Television Review and Classification Board	MTRCB	October 5, 1985	
Victorino Manalo	Executive Director of the National Archives of the Philippines	National Archives of the Philippines	NAP	May 21, 2007	April 18, 2023
Eric B. Zerrudo	Chairman of the Commission for Culture and the Arts	National Commission for Culture and the Arts	NCCA	April 3, 1992	January 7, 2026
Manny Pacquiao	Lead Convenor of the National Anti-Poverty Commission	National Anti-Poverty Commission	NAPC	June 30, 1998	September 8, 2026
Glenda D. Relova	Chairperson of the National Council on Disability Affairs	National Council on Disability Affairs	NCDA	January 4, 1981	
Ricardo de Leon	Director-General of the National Intelligence Coordinating Agency	National Intelligence Coordinating Agency	NICA	July 10, 1949	June 30, 2022
Dennis Pinlac; OIC	Chairman of the Optical Media Board	Optical Media Board	OMB	October 5, 1985	December 13, 2024
Anthony Alcantara	Executive Director of the Philippine Center on Transnational Crime	Philippine Center on Transnational Crime	PCTC		August 2024
Felix Reyes	Chairman of the Philippine Charity Sweepstakes Office	Philippine Charity Sweepstakes Office	PCSO	October 30, 1934	May 28, 2024
Michael G. Aguinaldo	Chairperson of the Philippine Competition Commission	Philippine Competition Commission	PhCC	January 27, 2016	January 12, 2023
Isagani R. Nerez	Director-General of the Philippine Drug Enforcement Agency	Philippine Drug Enforcement Agency	PDEA	July 7, 2002	February 4, 2025
Kat de Castro	Director-General of the Philippine Information Agency	Philippine Information Agency	PIA		October 3, 2024
Luis D. Carlos	Postmaster General of the Philippine Postal Corporation	Philippine Postal Corporation	PHLPost	1767	July 19, 2024
Alex Lopez	Chairman of the Philippine Reclamation Authority	Philippine Reclamation Authority	PRA		November 2023
Gay Jane Perez; Ad interim	Director-General of the Philippine Space Agency	Philippine Space Agency	PhilSA	August 8, 2019	January 22, 2026
Patrick Gregorio	Chairperson of the Philippine Sports Commission	Philippine Sports Commission	PSC	January 24, 1990	December 28, 2022
Andro Val P. Abayon	Commander of the Presidential Security Command	Presidential Security Command	PSG	June 23, 1898	
Eduardo Aliño	Chairman and Administrator of the Subic Bay Metropolitan Authority	Subic Bay Metropolitan Authority	SBMA	March 13, 1992	

== See also ==
- Executive departments of the Philippines
- List of female cabinet secretaries of the Philippines
