= Eduardo del Rosario =

Philippine general and politician

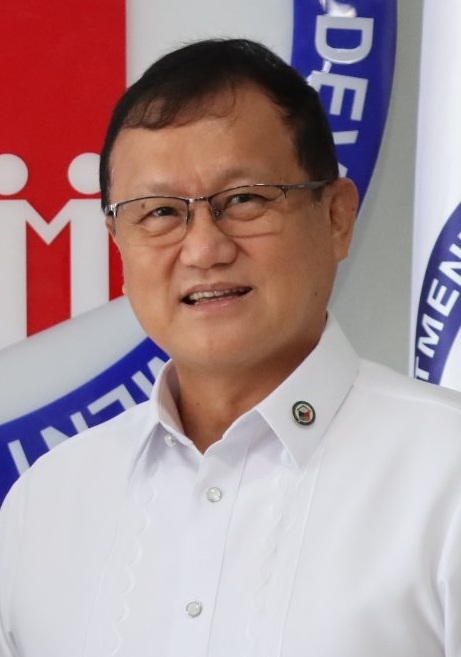
- Del Rosario in 2022

1st Secretary of Human Settlements and Urban Development
- In office January 2, 2020 – June 30, 2022
- President: Rodrigo Duterte
- Preceded by: Position established
- Succeeded by: Melissa Ardanas (OIC); Jose Acuzar

7th Chairman of the Housing and Urban Development Coordinating Council
- In office July 12, 2017 – December 31, 2019
- President: Rodrigo Duterte
- Preceded by: Leoncio Evasco Jr.
- Succeeded by: Position abolished, reorganized into the Department of Human Settlements and Urban Development

Undersecretary of the Department of National Defense Civil, Veterans and Retiree Affairs
- In office June 30, 2016 – July 11, 2017
- President: Rodrigo Duterte
- Preceded by: Jesus Millan
- Succeeded by: Reynaldo Mapagu

Administrator of the Office of Civil Defense and Executive Director of the National Disaster Risk Reduction and Management Council
- In office February 1, 2013 – May 12, 2014
- President: Benigno Aquino III
- Preceded by: Benito Ramos
- Succeeded by: Alexander Pama

OIC Commander AFP Southern Luzon Command
- In office 2011–2012
- President: Benigno Aquino III; Gloria Macapagal-Arroyo
- Preceded by: Alexander Yano

Civil Relations Service, AFP
- In office 2010–2011
- President: Benigno Aquino III
- Preceded by: Hermogenes Esperon Jr.

Commander AFP Special Operations Command
- In office 2006–2007

Personal details
- Born: Eduardo Drueco del Rosario; November 22, 1956 (age 69) Talavera, Nueva Ecija, Philippines
- Spouse: Annie Rita del Rosario
- Children: 1
- Education: Adamson University (B.Sc. ME); Philippine Military Academy (B.Sc. Mil.); Ateneo de Manila University (MBA); Philippine Christian University (MPA)
- Occupation: Government official

Military service
- Allegiance: Philippines
- Branch/service: Philippine Army
- Years of service: 1975–2012
- Rank: Major General
- Unit: 2nd Infantry Division, PA 803rd Infantry Brigade, 8ID, PA; 1003rd Infantry Brigade, 10ID, PA; 73rd Infantry Battalion, 10ID, PA
- Commands: AFP Southern Luzon Command; Civil Affairs Group, PA, AFP Special Operations Command
- Battles/wars: Communist rebellion in the Philippines; Moro conflict

Eduardo "Ed" Drueco del Rosario (born November 22, 1956) is a Philippine Army veteran and government official who served as the first Secretary of Human Settlements and Urban Development of the Philippines under the Duterte administration, from January 2, 2020 to June 30, 2022. He previously served as Chairperson of the now-defunct Housing and Urban Development Coordinating Council which was abolished and replaced by the Department of Human Settlements and Urban Development created through Republic Act No. 11201 on February 14, 2019. Del Rosario served 37 years in the Armed Forces of the Philippines, retiring as a major general in 2012. His service included tours as commander of the AFP Southern Luzon Command and of the 2nd Infantry Division.

== Early life and education ==
Del Rosario is a native of Nueva Ecija, having been born in Talavera on November 22, 1956. He went to Adamson University in Manila to take up a bachelor's degree in Mechanical Engineering from 1973 to 1975 before attending military college in Baguio. Del Rosario graduated from the Philippine Military Academy as part of the Mapitagan Class of 1980.

Del Rosario's professional military training includes: Scout Ranger Course and Basic Airborne Course where he ranked third out of 103 in 1980; Field Artillery Officer Basic Course at Combat Arms School, TC, PA in 1989 where he topped his class; Field Artillery Officer Advance Course at Fort Sill, Oklahoma, USA in 1991; Pre-Command Course for Battalion Commanders at the CGSS, TRADOC, PA in 1995; Command and General Staff Course in CGSS, TRADOC, PA in 1999; and Counter Terrorism Course at Naval Postgraduate School, California, USA in 2003.

Del Rosario earned a Master of Business Administration from Ateneo de Manila University in 1994. He also holds a Master of Public Administration from Philippine Christian University (2012). Del Rosario also completed his training for Public Corporate Governance at the Development Academy of the Philippines in 2017.

== Military service ==
Del Rosario served in the Special Forces Regiment based in Fort Magsaysay, Nueva Ecija from 1981 to 1989. In 1990, he was assigned with the 8th Infantry Division in Catbalogan, Samar as a battery commander of the 8th Field Artillery Battery. Between 1993 and 1994, he was in charge of the Philippine Army's Doctrine Development Center as its Commanding Officer. He remained in Fort Magsaysay and served as Assistant Chief of Staff of the 7th Infantry Division in 2000.

Del Rosario then served as Battalion Commander of the 73rd Infantry Battalion of the 10th Infantry Division based in Davao City at the height of the CPP-NPA-NDF conflict in southern Mindanao in the early 2000s. In 2003, he took on the position of Commanding Officer of the Philippine Army's Civil Affairs Group. He became commander of Task Force Davao in 2004 which initiated the revival of the Alsa Lumad, a counter-insurgency program from the 1980s and 1990s that mobilised the Lumad indigenous communities against the New People's Army during the term of then-Mayor of Davao City, Rodrigo Duterte. Del Rosario held this position until 2006. He then served briefly as commander of the AFP Joint Special Operations Group based in Camp Aguinaldo, Quezon City before returning to Samar as Commander of the 803rd Infantry Brigade from 2007 to 2009 and as Assistant Division Commander in 2009.

In 2009, then Brigadier General del Rosario returned to Davao City as commander of the 1003rd Infantry Brigade and reactivated the recruitment of indigenous peoples into the Citizen Armed Force Geographical Unit (CAFGU) with the aim of diminishing the strength of the Communist rebels operating in the city's Toril, Calinan, Marilog and Paquibato districts. He earned the nickname "Datu Limbotong" ("Protector of Lumad's interest") and was baptized by the tribal chieftains of Davao. B.Gen. del Rosario was also Internal Auditor of the Philippine Army and head of the Armed Forces of the Philippines Civil Relations Service when he was promoted by President Benigno Aquino III to the rank of Major General in 2011.

M.Gen. del Rosario was reassigned briefly as General Officer-in-Charge of the AFP Southern Luzon Command based in Lucena in 2012. As SoLCom chief, del Rosario spearheaded the military mission Task Force Kalihim for the search and retrieval for the remains of Interior Secretary Jesse Robredo who died in the 2012 Philippines Piper Seneca crash in Masbate in August 2012. President Aquino awarded him the Bakas Parangal ng Kabayanihan for this mission. His last military assignment was as commanding general of the 2nd Infantry Division based in Tanay, Rizal before his compulsory retirement in November 2012.

== Political career ==
Retired M.Gen. del Rosario was appointed by President Benigno Aquino III as Administrator of the Office of Civil Defense in February 2013 following his mandatory retirement from the Armed Forces at age 56. Concurrent to his duties with the OCD, he also held the position of Executive Director of the National Disaster Risk Reduction and Management Council under the Aquino administration. As OCD and NDRRMC chief, he led the government's emergency and disaster management councils in assisting victims of the 2013 Bohol earthquake, the Zamboanga City crisis and Tropical Storm Lingling. Del Rosario resigned from his post in April 2014 citing health reasons, but which critics said was due to the government's poor preparations and response in the aftermath of Typhoon Haiyan.

Del Rosario ran unsuccessfully for Senate as an independent in 2016. In June 2016, upon assumption of Rodrigo Duterte as president of the country, del Rosario returned to government service as Undersecretary for Civil, Veterans and Retiree Affairs of the Department of National Defense. Del Rosario then served as Chairman of the Housing and Urban Development Coordinating Council succeeding Leoncio Evasco Jr. in July 2017. As housing secretary, del Rosario also served as Chairman of the Boards of the National Housing Authority (Philippines), Social Housing Finance Corporation, Housing and Land Use Regulatory Board, Home Development Mutual Fund (PAGIBIG), National Home Mortgage Finance Corporation and as Vice Chairman of the Home Guarantee Corporation. He also headed the Task Force Bangon Marawi created in June 2017 in the aftermath of the Battle of Marawi. Following the creation of the Department of Human Settlements and Urban Development through Republic Act No. 11201 signed by President Duterte in February 2019, del Rosario was appointed as the executive department's first acting secretary with his appointment paper signed on January 2, 2020. His appointment was confirmed by the Commission on Appointments on November 19, 2020.

== Personal life ==
Del Rosario is married to Dr. Annie Rita A. del Rosario. They have one son named Henry.

== Awards ==
- Distinguished Service Star
- Gold Cross (Philippines)
- Outstanding Achievement Medal
- Military Merit Medal (Philippines)
- Long Service Medal
- Military Commendation Medal
- Bakas Parangal ng Kabayanihan

Political offices
Preceded by Leoncio Evasco Jr.	Chairman of Housing and Urban Development Coordinating Council; 2017–2019	Position abolished
New office	Secretary of Human Settlements and Urban Development; 2020–2022	Succeeded by Melissa Ardanas (OIC); Jose Acuzar
