= Executive departments of the Philippines =

Largest component of the executive branch of the government of the Philippines

Executive departments are the largest component of the executive branch of the government of the Philippines. These departments comprise the largest part of the country's bureaucracy.

== Current executive departments ==
All departments are listed by their present-day name with their English names on top and Filipino names at the other column. Department heads are listed at the Cabinet of the Philippines article.

Department	Native name	Seal	Formed	Legal instrument	Head		
Department	Native name	Seal	Formed	Legal instrument	Title	Titleholder	Portrait
Department of Agrarian Reform	Kagawaran ng Repormang Pangsaka		September 10, 1971; 55 years ago	R.A. 6657 (Comprehensive Agrarian Reform Law of 1988)	Secretary of Agrarian Reform	Conrado Estrella III	
Department of Agriculture	Kagawaran ng Pagsasaka		June 23, 1898; 128 years ago	Executive Order 292 (Administrative Code of the Philippines Book IV Title IV	Secretary of Agriculture	Francisco Tiu Laurel Jr.	
Department of Budget and Management	Kagawaran ng Badyet at Pamamahala		April 25, 1936; 90 years ago	Executive Order 292 (Administrative Code of the Philippines Book IV Title XVII	Secretary of Budget and Management	Kim Robert de Leon (acting)	
Department of Economy, Planning, and Development	Kagawaran ng Ekonomiya, Pagpaplano, at Pagpapaunlad		December 23, 1935; 90 years ago	Republic Act No. 12145, (Economy, Planning, and Development Act)	Secretary of Economy, Planning, and Development	Arsenio Balisacan	
Department of Education	Kagawaran ng Edukasyon		January 21, 1901; 125 years ago	Republic Act No. 9155, (Governance of Basic Education Act of 2001)	Secretary of Education	Sonny Angara	
Department of Energy	Kagawaran ng Enerhiya		December 9, 1992; 33 years ago	Republic Act No. 7638, (Department of Energy Act of 1992)	Secretary of Energy	Sharon Garin	
Department of Environment and Natural Resources	Kagawaran ng Kapaligiran at Likas na Yaman		January 1, 1917; 109 years ago	Executive Order No. 192. Reorganization Act of the Department of Environment and Natural Resources."	Secretary of Environment and Natural Resources	Juan Miguel Cuna (OIC)	
Department of Finance	Kagawaran ng Pananalapi		April 17, 1897; 129 years ago		Secretary of Finance	Frederick Go (ad interim)	
Department of Foreign Affairs	Kagawaran ng Ugnayang Panlabas		June 23, 1898; 128 years ago		Secretary of Foreign Affairs	Tess Lazaro	
Department of Health	Kagawaran ng Kalusugan		September 10, 1898; 128 years ago		Secretary of Health	Edwin Mercado (ad interim)	
Department of Human Settlements and Urban Development	Kagawaran ng Pananahanang Pantao at Pagpapaunlad ng Kalunsuran		February 14, 2019; 7 years ago		Secretary of Human Settlements and Urban Development	Jose Ramon Aliling	
Department of Information and Communications Technology	Kagawaran ng Teknolohiyang Pang-Impormasyon at Komunikasyon		June 9, 2016; 10 years ago		Secretary of Information and Communications Technology	Robert Joseph M. de Claro	
Department of the Interior and Local Government	Kagawaran ng Interyor at Pamahalaang Lokal		March 22, 1897; 129 years ago		Secretary of the Interior and Local Government	Jonvic Remulla	
Department of Justice	Kagawaran ng Katarungan		April 17, 1897; 129 years ago		Secretary of Justice	Fredderick Vida (acting)	
Department of Labor and Employment	Kagawaran ng Paggawa at Empleo		December 8, 1933; 92 years ago		Secretary of Labor and Employment	Francis Tolentino (acting)	
Department of Migrant Workers	Kagawaran ng Manggagawang Pandarayuhan		February 3, 2022; 4 years ago		Secretary of Migrant Workers	Hans Cacdac	
Department of National Defense	Kagawaran ng Tanggulang Pambansa		November 1, 1939; 86 years ago		Secretary of National Defense	Gilbert Teodoro	
Department of Public Works and Highways	Kagawaran ng mga Pagawain at Lansangang Bayan		June 23, 1898; 128 years ago		Secretary of Public Works and Highways	Vince Dizon (ad interim)	
Department of Science and Technology	Kagawaran ng Agham at Teknolohiya		January 30, 1987; 39 years ago		Secretary of Science and Technology	Renato Solidum Jr.	
Department of Social Welfare and Development	Kagawaran ng Kagalingan at Pagpapaunlad Panlipunan		November 1, 1939; 86 years ago		Secretary of Social Welfare and Development	Rex Gatchalian	
Department of Tourism	Kagawaran ng Turismo		May 11, 1973; 53 years ago		Secretary of Tourism	Dita Angara-Mathay (ad interim)	
Department of Trade and Industry	Kagawaran ng Kalakalan at Industriya		June 23, 1898; 128 years ago		Secretary of Trade and Industry	Cristina Aldeguer-Roque	
Department of Transportation	Kagawaran ng Transportasyon		January 23, 1899; 127 years ago		Secretary of Transportation	Giovanni Z. Lopez (acting)	

== Former executive departments ==
The departments listed below are defunct agencies which have been abolished, integrated, reorganized or renamed into the existing executive departments of the Philippines.

=== First Republic ===
- Department of Agriculture, Industry and Commerce
- Department of Communications and Public Works
- Department of the Interior
- Department of Foreign Relations
- Department of Public Education
- Department of Wars and Marine
- Department of Finance
- Department of Justice

=== Commonwealth Period ===
- Department of Agriculture and Commerce
- Department of Agriculture and Natural Resources
- Department of Commerce and Police
- Department of Health and Public Welfare
- Department of Finance and Justice
- Department of Instruction
- Department of Labor
- Department of National Defense
- Department of Public Instruction

=== Third Republic ===
- Department of Agriculture and Natural Resources
- Department of Commerce and Industry
- Department of General Services
- Department of Social Welfare

=== Martial law era (Fourth Republic) ===
- Ministry of Agriculture and Food
- Ministry of Education and Culture
- Ministry of Education, Culture and Sports
- Ministry of Human Settlements
- Ministry of Industry
- Ministry of Labor
- Ministry of Local Government and Community Development
- Ministry of National Defense
- Ministry of Natural Resources
- Ministry of Public Highways
- Ministry of Public Information
- Ministry of Public Works, Transportation and Communications
- Ministry of Social Services and Development
- Ministry of Trade and Tourism
- Ministry of Youth and Sports Development

=== Fifth Republic ===
- Department of Education, Culture and Sports
- Department of Environment, Energy and Natural Resources
- Department of Land Reform
- Department of Transportation and Communications

== Agencies elevated to department rank ==
- Budget Commission → Ministry of Budget and Management (1978)
- National Science and Technology Authority → Department of Science and Technology (1987)
- Office of Energy Affairs → Department of Energy (1992)
- Office of Information and Communications Technology → Department of Information and Communications Technology (2016)
- Housing and Urban Development Coordinating Council → Department of Human Settlements and Urban Development (2019)
- Philippine Overseas Employment Administration → Department of Migrant Workers (2021)
- National Economic and Development Authority → Department of Economy, Planning, and Development (2025)

== Proposed executive departments ==
- Department of Disaster Resilience
- Department of Sports
- Department of Culture or Department of Arts and Culture
- Department of Technical Education and Skills Development
- Department of Water Resources
- Department of Fisheries and Aquatic Resources, proposed by Senator Francis Pangilinan and then-House Speaker Alan Peter Cayetano

== See also ==
- Cabinet of the Philippines – the heads of the executive departments of the Philippines
- List of Cabinets of the Philippines
