= Housing and Urban Development Coordinating Council =

Former Philippine government agency

- Sangguniang Tagapag-ugnay sa Pagpapaunlad ng Pabahay at Kalungsuran
- Logo of HUDCC

Agency overview
- Formed: December 17, 1986
- Dissolved: February 14, 2019
- Superseding agency: Department of Human Settlements and Urban Development
- Headquarters: 9/F BDO Plaza, Paseo de Roxas, Makati
- Agency executive: Sec. Jose Acuzar, Chairman
- Parent agency: Office of the President of the Philippines
- Website: www.hudcc.gov.ph

The Housing and Urban Development Coordinating Council (HUDCC) was the umbrella agency of various housing and development offices of the Philippine government. It was established by President Corazon Aquino through Executive Order No. 90, Series of 1986.

The law creating the Department of Human Settlements and Urban Development (DHSUD), Republic Act No. 11201, was signed into law by President Rodrigo Duterte on February 14, 2019, with the signing announced to the public by the government on 19 February 2019. The DHSUD was a merger of the HUDCC and the Housing and Land Use Regulatory Board (HLURB), with the former becoming defunct and the latter reorganized as the Human Settlements Adjudication Commission (HSAC). The law was a consolidation of House Bill 6775 and Senate Bill 1578 which were passed by the House of Representatives and the Senate on October 10 and November 12, 2018, respectively. The Implementing Rules and Regulations (IRR) for RA 11201 were signed on July 19, 2019. A five-month transition period will begin with full implementation of the law on January 1, 2020.

== Attached agencies ==
- Home Development Mutual Fund (HDMF)
- National Housing Authority (Philippines) (NHA)
- Housing and Land Use Regulatory Board (HLURB)
- Home Guaranty Corporation (HGC)
- National Home Mortgage Finance Corporation (NHMFC)
- Social Housing Finance Corporation (SHFC)

== Chairperson ==
Executive Order No. 20, Series of 2001 effectively elevated the chairperson of the HUDCC as a cabinet official, with the officeholder holding the rank of Secretary, subject to the approval of the Commission on Appointments. However, since the administration of President Gloria Macapagal Arroyo, it has been designated as the cabinet portfolio of the Vice President of the Philippines, thus needing no confirmation by the Commission on Appointment as stipulated by the Philippine Constitution.

Vice Presidents Noli de Castro and Jejomar Binay headed the agency during their tenures, although Binay resigned from the post before his term as deputy chief executive lapsed. On 7 July 2016, President Rodrigo Duterte appointed Vice President Leni Robredo as chairperson of the HUDCC; however, on December 5, Robredo resigned from the post. She was replaced by Cabinet Secretary, Leoncio Evasco Jr. Sec. Jose Acuzar, the current chairman, now heads the council.

== List of Chairpersons of the Housing and Urban Development Coordinating Council (as Cabinet-level rank) ==
#	Image	Name	Term Began	Term Ended	President
Executive Order No. 20, Series of 2001 effectively elevated the chairperson of the HUDCC as a cabinet official, with the officeholder holding the rank of Secretary.
1		Mike Defensor	January 20, 2001	June 30, 2004	Gloria Macapagal–Arroyo
2		Noli de Castro	June 30, 2004	June 30, 2010	Gloria Macapagal–Arroyo
3		Jejomar Binay	June 30, 2010	June 25, 2015	Benigno S. Aquino III
4		Chito M. Cruz	July 31, 2015	June 30, 2016	Benigno S. Aquino III
5		Leni Robredo	July 12, 2016	December 5, 2016	Rodrigo Duterte
6		Leoncio Evasco Jr.	December 5, 2016	July 12, 2017	Rodrigo Duterte
7		Eduardo del Rosario	July 12, 2017	February 14, 2019	Rodrigo Duterte
Republic Act No. 11201 establishes the Department of Human Settlements and Urban Development formally abolishing the Housing and Urban Development Coordinating Council.
