= Talavera, Nueva Ecija =

Municipality in Nueva Ecija, Philippines

Talavera
- Municipality
- Municipality of Talavera
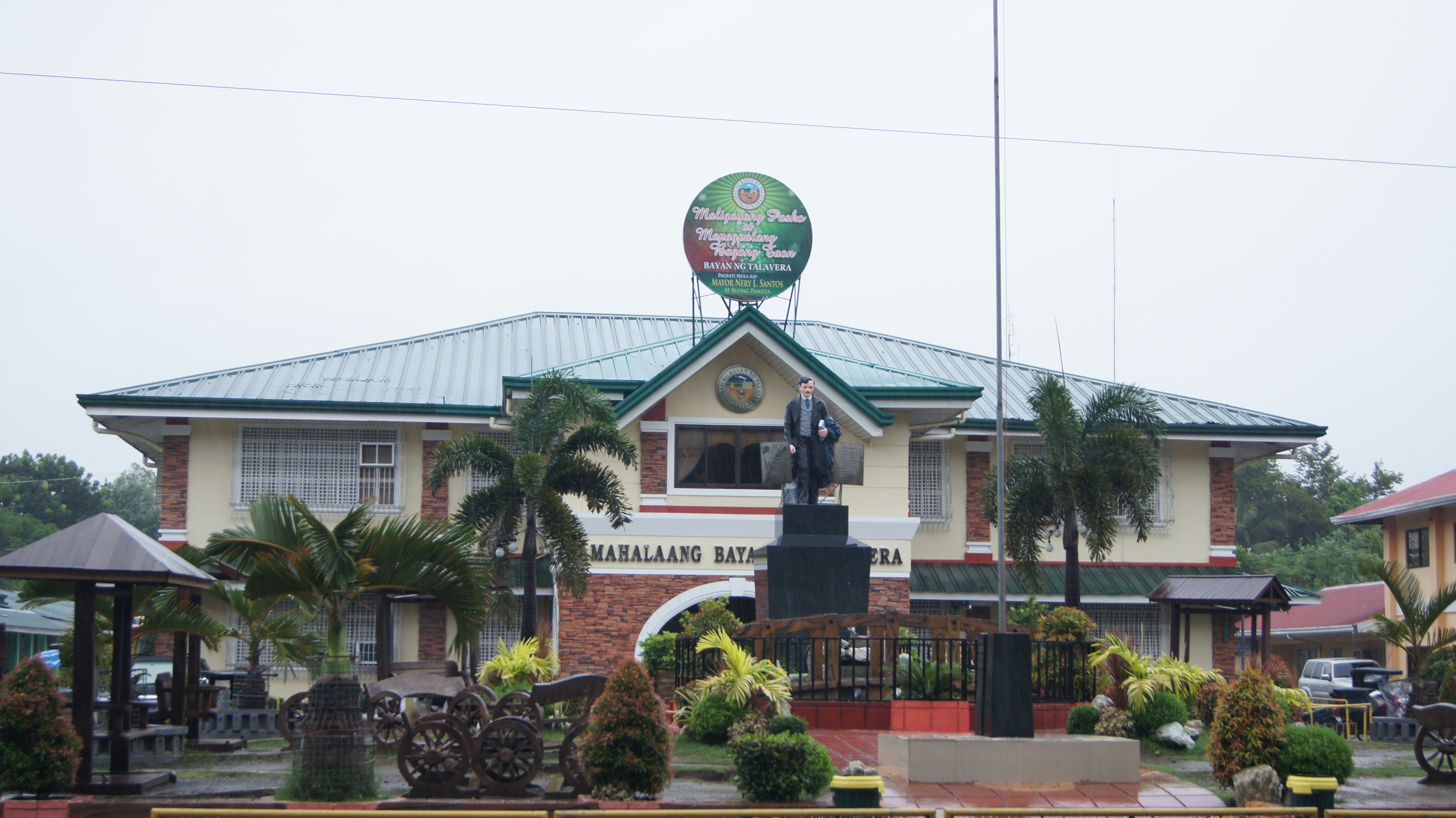
- Talavera Municipal Hall

- Seal
- Nickname: "The Vegetable Basket of Nueva Ecija"
- Motto: Angat Talavera
- Map of Nueva Ecija with Talavera highlighted
- Interactive map of Talavera
- Location within the Philippines
- Coordinates: 15°35′02″N 120°55′08″E
- Country: Philippines
- Region: Central Luzon
- Province: Nueva Ecija
- District: 1st district
- Founded: 1872
- Named for: Talavera de la Reina, Spain
- Barangays: 53 (see Barangays)

Government
  - Type: Sangguniang Bayan
  - Mayor: Aries Vincent Patrick Gaboy Lim
  - Vice Mayor: Nerito Sariente Santos Jr.
  - Representative: Mikaela Angela B. Suansing
  - Councilors: Members: Michael Maliwat Fausto; Ryan Arellano; Raphael Villanueva; Vergilio Tayao; Rene Baldedara; Erwin Chioco; Joel Del Rosario; Ape Reyes
  - Electorate: 98,488 voters (2025)

Area
  - Total: 140.92 km^{2} (54.41 sq mi)
- Elevation: 42 m (138 ft)
- Highest elevation: 61 m (200 ft)
- Lowest elevation: 31 m (102 ft)

Population (2024 census)
  - Total: 137,444
  - Density: 975.33/km^{2} (2,526.1/sq mi)
  - Households: 33,071

Economy
  - Income class: 1st municipal income class
  - Poverty incidence: 8.99% (2023)
  - Revenue: ₱ 630.9 million (2024)
  - Assets: ₱ 2,200 million (2024)
  - Expenditure: ₱ 605.1 million (2024)
  - Liabilities: ₱ 1,095 million (2024)

Service provider
  - Electricity: Nueva Ecija 2 Area 1 Electric Cooperative (NEECO 2 A1)
- Time zone: UTC+8 (PST)
- ZIP code: 3114
- PSGC: 0304930000
- IDD : area code: +63 (0)44
- Native languages: Ilocano; Tagalog
- Website: www.talavera.gov.ph

Talavera, officially the Municipality of Talavera (Tagalog: Bayan ng Talavera; Ilocano: Ili ti Talavera), is a municipality in the province of Nueva Ecija, Philippines. According to the 2024 census, it had a population of 137,444.

== History ==
=== Early settlement and religious missions (1595–1846) ===
Early historical accounts of Talavera, which was then known as Catuguian, came from Catholic missions in the lowland regions of Nueva Ecija, particularly the Augustinian mission in Gapan which was established in 1595. These missions led to the establishment of a series of subsidiary missions, or visitas, in the surrounding areas. The Augustinian mission in Catuguian was set up as a subsidiary of the visita in Cabanatuan (established in 1750). When Cabanatuan was made a capital city (cabecera) in 1780, the Augustinian missionaries assigned to Cabanatuan carried out small religious missions within its jurisdiction. Talavera or Catuguian, then, became a visita (a subsidiary mission) of the Augustinian religious mission in Cabanatuan in 1846.

The establishment of the visita in Talavera helped consolidate dispersed settlements and contributed to community growth, which was largely composed of skilled Tagalog farmers. The visita also supported the development of local religious and administrative structure. This contributed to population growth in Talavera (Catuguian), especially after Nueva Ecija became an independent province in 1848, having previously been organized as a district (corregimiento) in 1801.

=== Establishment of the town (1852–1853) ===
In 1852, the inhabitants of Catuguian submitted a petition to the mayor (alcalde) of Nueva Ecija requesting the creation of a town (pueblo). The proposal sought to consolidate the barrios of La Torre, Concepcion, Pulong Buli (later Santo Domingo), Valle, and Baloc, with Catuguian designated as the seat of the new town. The petition was forwarded to the Governor-General in Manila for approval.

The town was formally established on 11 December 1852. Catuguian was designated as the cabecera (administrative headquarters), with the initial jurisdiction comprising the barrios of La Torre, Santo Domingo, Baloc, Concepcion, and Valle.

A subsequent petition was filed on February 4, 1853, to the governor-general in Manila, requesting that the town would be renamed "Talavera", after Talavera de la Reina in Spain. The petition was approved on February 14, 1853, and Catuguian officially came to be known as Talavera.

=== Spanish colonial administration and growth (1853–1898) ===
Following a royal decree dated 20 December 1863, a system of separate primary education for boys and girls was established in each pueblo, including in Talavera. By 1866, the population had risen to 4,421 inhabitants. On 20 November 1872, a Royal Decree issued by King Amadeo I formally recognized the Parroquia de Talavera as an independent parish.

Due to its extensive grasslands, Talavera became a major cattle supplier for the Manila market.

=== American colonial period and territorial changes (1898–1941) ===
During the Philippine-American War, Talavera was occupied by General Henry Lawton. In 1910, the Sitio of Bacal, formerly Buenavista (part of San Juan de Guimba), was annexed to Talavera in 1910 upon the recommendation of Isauro Gabaldon. In 1912, the Sitios of Kabisukulan, Rangayan, Rizal, Sineguelas, Pukoc, Agricultura, Pulong-Maragol, and Mataas-na-Lupa were separated from Talavera and were organized into an independent municipality under Muñoz in 1912. In 1914, the barrio of Lomboy was annexed to Talavera. In 1937, the barrio of San Francisco was separated from Talavera and was annexed to Santo Domingo in 1937.

During the American occupation, a wave of migration to Talavera increased due to rising demand for agriculture and livestock grazing, as haciendas grew in size. Peasant struggles became evident in San Ricardo, Bantug, Casili, and Morcon, because of landlordism and shared tenancy, including unfair farm practices on rations and tenant pays. Land tenure remained a problem, as land ownership was not widely transferred to tenant farmers.

=== Japanese occupation and World War II (1941–1945) ===
In December 1941, the Imperial Japanese Army occupied Talavera. Squadron 8 of the Hukbalahap was formed in Talavera, with more than 100 members. In 1945, Talavera, particularly the areas of San Pascual and Pinagpanaan, became a strategic line of defense against the retreating Imperial Japanese Army. Barangay Sibul became a rendezvous point for 510 rescued prisoners of war at Camp Pangatian.

=== Postwar period and administrative changes (1945–1955) ===
After the war, Talavera experienced the expansion of the Huk forces in Nueva Ecija, which became part of what was known as Huklandia. Several barrios of Talavera, namely General Luna, Morcon, Mabini, Ricarte, Casili, and Picon, along with Plaridel and Bosque, were annexed to Llanera in 1955.

== Geography ==
Talavera is relatively flat, with a slope ranging from 0 to 3%. Its elevation, which ranges from 31m to 61m above sea level, with an average elevation of 42m, supports agricultural, commercial, and industrial land use. Its aggregate arable land amounts to 12,698.1 ha (about 89.1% of its total land area), of which less than 70% is irrigated or cultivated. Its land form consists generally of a broad expanse of low-lying level plains, with generally level terrain covered mostly by grasslands.

Talavera is part of the Cabanatuan conurbation as an adjacent urban center in Central Nueva Ecija. It is bordered by Cabanatuan, Llanera, Muñoz, Aliaga, General Mamerto Natividad, Santo Domingo and San Jose.

Talavera is 14 kilometres (8.7 mi) from Cabanatuan, 28 kilometres (17 mi) from Palayan, and 130 kilometres (81 mi) from Manila.

=== Barangays ===
Talavera is politically subdivided into 53 barangays, as shown below. Each barangay consists of puroks, and some includes sitios.

Barangays in italics are exclaves of Talavera surrounded by Science City of Muñoz, while barangays in bold are disputed with neighboring Santo Domingo.

- Andal Aliño (Poblacion)
- Bagong Sikat
- Bagong Silang
- Bakal I
- Bakal II
- Bakal III
- Baluga
- Bantug
- Bantug Hacienda
- Basang Hamog
- Bugtong na Buli
- Bulac
- Burnay
- Calipahan
- Campos
- **Casulucan Este**
- Collado
- Dimasalang Norte
- Dimasalang Sur
- Dinarayat
- Esguerra District (Poblacion)
- Gulod
- Homestead I
- Homestead II
- Cabubulaunan
- Caaninaplahan
- Caputican
- Kinalanguyan
- La Torre
- Lomboy
- Mabuhay
- Maestrang Kikay District (Poblacion)
- Mamandil
- Marcos District (Poblacion)
- Matias District (Poblacion)
- Matingkis
- Minabuyoc
- Pag-asa District (Poblacion)
- Paludpod
- Pantoc Bulac
- Pinagpanaan
- Poblacion Sur (Poblacion)
- Pula
- Pulong San Miguel (Poblacion)
- Sampaloc
- San Miguel na Munti
- San Pascual
- San Ricardo
- Sibul
- Sicsican Matanda
- Tabacao
- Tagaytay
- Valle

=== Dispute with Science City of Muñoz ===
From 1996 to 1999, Talavera, Nueva Ecija, was involved in a territorial dispute with the newly established Science City of Muñoz, then led by Mayor Efren L. Alvarez. The dispute concerned the barangays of Bakal I, Bakal II, Bakal III, and Matingkis. Officials of Muñoz claimed that these areas had previously been part of the city and should be annexed as component barangays.

In response, the Talavera local government asserted its jurisdiction over the disputed areas. The municipal government passed resolutions affirming that the barangays had been part of Talavera since 1910, following their annexation under Executive Order No. 39 (1909). In October 1998, the Sangguniang Bayan of Talavera formally rejected the annexation claims. During the same period, barangay councils in the affected areas passed their own resolutions opposing the proposed transfer.

In February 1999, the Talavera local government created the Task Force Bacal District to address the dispute and referred the matter to Congress for possible arbitration. The following month, Talavera officials submitted supporting documents to Congress. By the end of March 1999, following legislative intervention and consultations with local officials and residents, the annexation claims were set aside, reaffirming Talavera’s jurisdiction over the disputed barangays.

=== Climate ===
Climate data for Talavera, Nueva Ecija
Month	Jan	Feb	Mar	Apr	May	Jun	Jul	Aug	Sep	Oct	Nov	Dec	Year
Mean daily maximum °C (°F)	29 (84)	30 (86)	32 (90)	34 (93)	33 (91)	31 (88)	30 (86)	29 (84)	29 (84)	30 (86)	30 (86)	29 (84)	31 (87)
Mean daily minimum °C (°F)	19 (66)	19 (66)	20 (68)	22 (72)	24 (75)	24 (75)	24 (75)	24 (75)	23 (73)	22 (72)	21 (70)	20 (68)	22 (71)
Average precipitation mm (inches)	4 (0.2)	6 (0.2)	7 (0.3)	12 (0.5)	61 (2.4)	89 (3.5)	96 (3.8)	99 (3.9)	81 (3.2)	88 (3.5)	37 (1.5)	13 (0.5)	593 (23.5)
Average rainy days	2.5	3.0	4.1	6.3	15.8	19.4	22.5	21.6	20.1	17.5	9.6	4.0	146.4
Source: Meteoblue

== Demographics ==
Population census of Talavera

Year	Pop.	±% p.a.
1903	3,352	—
1918	8,658	+6.53%
1939	20,442	+4.18%
1948	24,353	+1.96%
1960	28,603	+1.35%
1970	44,512	+4.52%
1975	53,011	+3.57%
1980	62,225	+3.26%

Year	Pop.	±% p.a.
1990	77,256	+2.19%
1995	85,797	+1.98%
2000	97,329	+2.74%
2007	105,122	+1.07%
2010	112,515	+2.50%
2015	124,829	+2.00%
2020	132,338	+1.24%
2024	137,444	+0.91%

Source: Philippine Statistics Authority

=== Religion ===
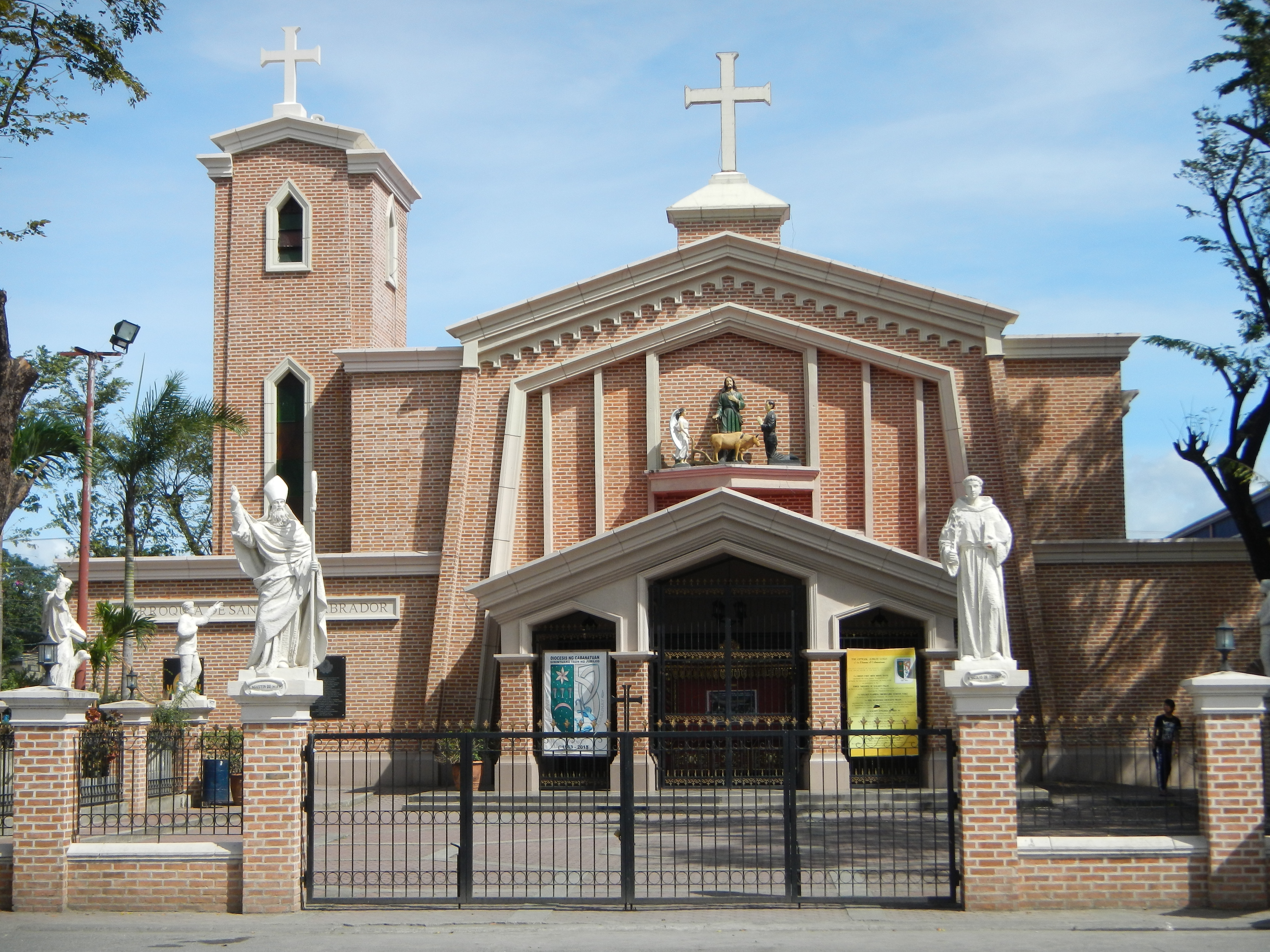
Diocesan Shrine and Parish of San Isidro Labrador

Roman Catholicism is the predominant religion in Talavera, with the majority of residents affiliated with the Roman Catholic Church. Other religious groups present in the municipality include Iglesia ni Cristo and various Protestant denominations. A small portion of the population reports no religious affiliation.

The municipality is served by the Diocesan Shrine and Parish of San Isidro Labrador under the Roman Catholic Diocese of Cabanatuan. It is the first shrine dedicated to San Isidro Labrador in the Philippines.

=== Ethnic groups and languages ===
Ethnic Groups and Languages (CBMS,2022)
Ethnic Groups	Population
Tagalog	119,669
Ilocano	2,830
Bisaya/Binisaya	785
Bikol/Bicol	206
Kapampangan	189
Maranao	143
Waray	100
Pangasinan/Panggalatok	94
Hiligaynon,Ilonggo	84
Cebuano	57
Others	118

A significant majority of Talavera's population belongs to the Tagalog ethnic group, accounting for about 96% of the total. Other ethnolinguistic groups include Ilocano (2.28%), Bisaya (0.63%), along with smaller communities belonging to other groups.

== Economy ==
Poverty incidence of Talavera (%)

Source: Philippine Statistics Authority

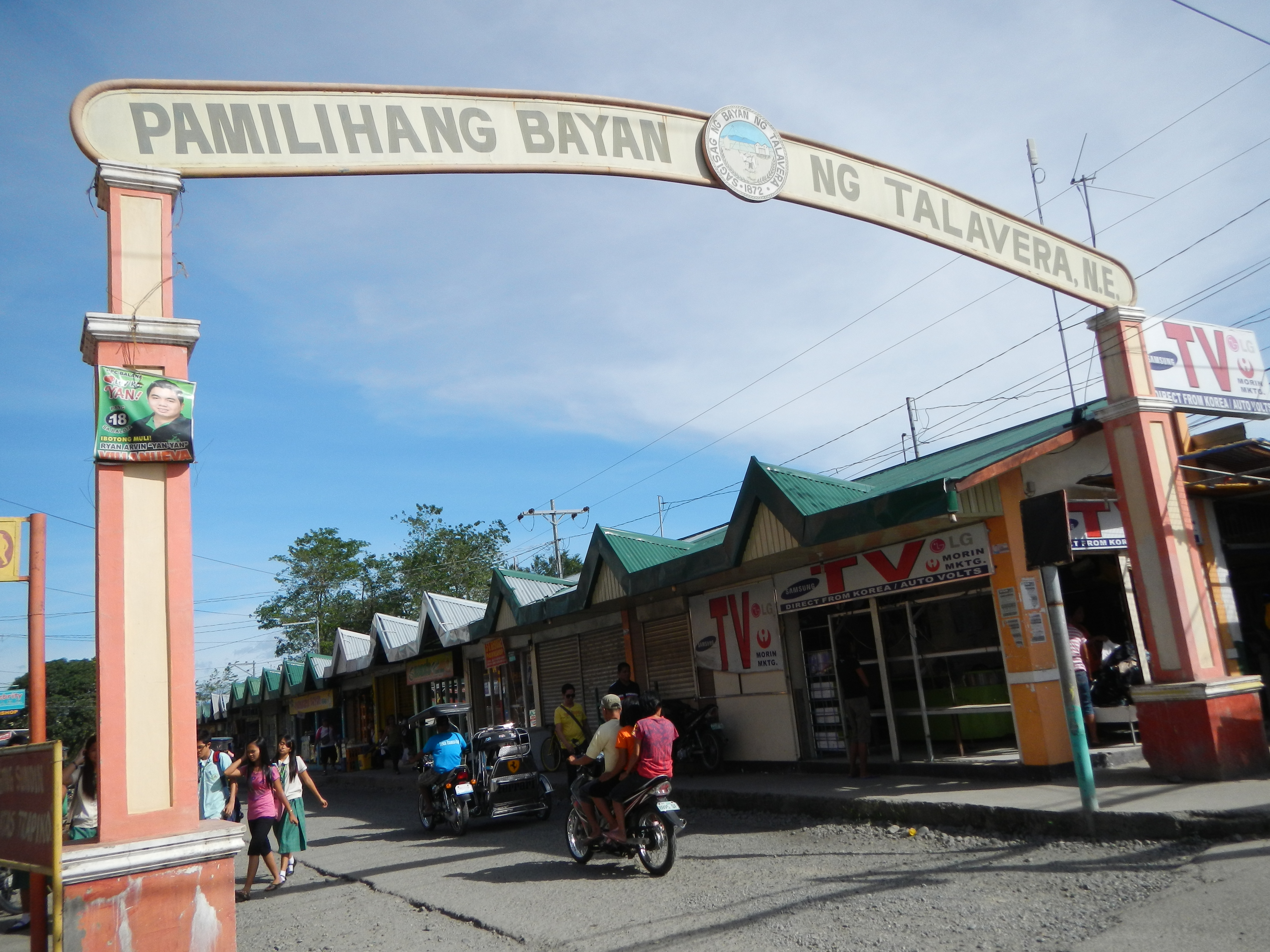
Market Road and stores

Talavera is a developing municipality in Nueva Ecija, with ongoing initiatives aimed at improving infrastructure, public services, and economic activity. As of 2017, the municipality reported a revenue-generated income of ₱298,361,401.93, and with exceeding population of 124,000, it meets the general requirements for cityhood. In July 2019, Congresswoman Estrellita B. Suansing filed House Bill No. 184, proposing the conversion of Talavera into a component city, which was later filed in the Senate in February 2021.

== Tourism ==
=== Landmarks ===
Talavera has several important cultural landmarks:

- Diocesan Shrine of St. Isidore the Worker
- Sicsican Bridge (declared as a cultural property in 2020)
- Gabaldon Building (Recognized as a built heritage in February 2019)
- Rizal Monument (Built between 1922 and 1930)
- Tal-Acacia Tree (Declared as a Cultural Property in 2020)

=== Festivals ===
Linggo ng Magsasaka - The Linggo ng Magsasaka is a week-long celebration held in honor of Talaverano Farmers. It culminates on the 15th day of May - the Town Fiesta. Highlights of the celebration generally include Cultural Dance Competition, Harana, Gandang Kalabaw, Float Parade, Street Dance, and Kesong Puti Festival.

Gatas ng Kalabaw - Gatas ng Kalabaw Festival is celebrated annually from May 12 to 15. It culminates in the celebration of the Town Fiesta, whose patron saint is Saint Isidore the Worker. The festival aims to actively encourage, promote, and enhance carabao's milk as a nutrition and livelihood industry. Highlights of the festival are street dancing, followed by a float parade, a parade of carabaos, a carabao race, an agri-trade fair, a milk drinking contest, and an ice cream making competition, among others.

Semana Santa - During Holy Week, the members of the San Isidro Labrador Parish Church commemorate Jesus' Paschal mystery. The church even has a community where each member owns a religious image called the Cofradia de la Sagrada Pasión del Nuestro Señor. Every Holy Wednesday and Good Fridays, the members of the Cofradia place the images of their saints in carozzas or karo and exhibit them for the townspeople to witness through a procession.

== Transportation ==
There are 24.77 kilometres (15.39 mi) of national roads, including the 16.93-kilometer (10.52 mi) section of Maharlika Highway (Asian Highway 26) that passes through the municipality. Due to its central location, Talavera serves as a transport link in Central Luzon.

Talavera is regularly serviced by various means of public transportation, from jeepneys, tricycles, to buses. Several bus companies operate routes passing through Talavera connecting Cagayan Valley and Aurora to Manila, Cabanatuan, San Jose City, Baguio, and other destinations.

== Healthcare ==
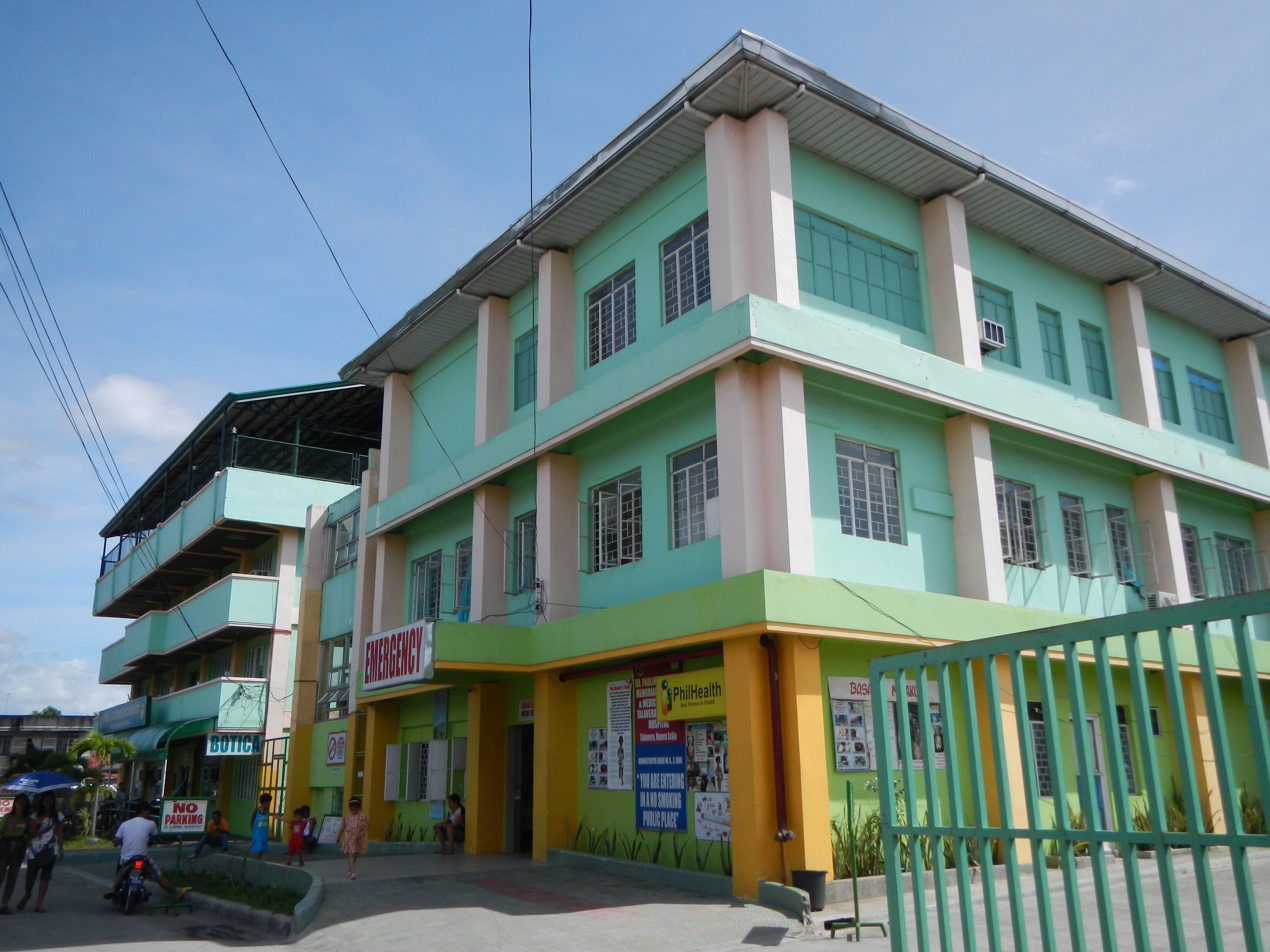
Talavera General Hospital

The municipality is served by Talavera General Hospital, a national government-funded hospital formerly known as Dr. Paulino J. Garcia Memorial Hospital - Talavera Extension Program. Medical and dental clinics also serve the municipality.

== Education ==
Talavera is served by both public and Department of Education-accredited private schools. The largest elementary school is Talavera Central School, situated in the town proper. The largest secondary educational institution is Talavera National High School (TNHS).

There are two schools district offices which govern all educational institutions within the municipality. They oversee the management and operations of all private and public, from primary to secondary schools. These are Talavera North Schools District Office, and Talavera South Schools District Office.

=== Primary and elementary schools ===
- Bagong Sikat Elementary School
- Bagong Silang Elementary School
- Bakal I Elementary School
- Bakal III Elementary School
- Bantug Elementary School
- Bantug Hacienda Elementary School
- Basang Hamog Elementary School
- Bugtong na Buli Primary School
- Bulac Elementary School
- Burnay Elementary School
- Cabubulaunan Elementary School
- Calipahan Elementary School
- Campos Elementary School
- Caputican Elementary School
- Casulucan Este Elementary School
- Collado Elementary School
- Dimasalang Norte Elementary School
- Dimasalang Sur Elementary School
- Dinarayat Elementary School
- Faith Christian Academy
- Gulod Elementary School
- Holy Angels Academy
- Homestead I Elementary School
- Homestead II Elementary School
- Kinalanguyan Elementary School
- Kobayashi Learning Center
- La Torre Elementary School
- Les Meridien Montessori
- Lomboy Elementary School
- Mabuhay Elementary School
- Mamandil Elementary School
- Mary's Little Angels Academy
- Matingkis Elementary School
- Minabuyok Elementary School
- Pantok Bulak Elementary School
- Paludpod Elementary School
- Poblacion Sur Elementary School
- Prairie House Learning Center
- Pula Elementary School
- Royal Heir Christian Academy
- Sacred Heart School of Talavera Inc.
- Sampaloc Elementary School
- San Jose Elementary School
- San Miguel Na Munti Elementary School
- San Ricardo Elementary School
- San Ricardo IEMELIF Learning Center
- Schola Christi
- Sibul Elementary School
- Sicsican Matanda Elementary School
- Tagaytay Elementary School
- Talavera Central School
- Talavera North Elementary School
- Talavera South Central School
- Valle Elementary School

=== Secondary schools ===
- Aski Skills and Knowledge Institute
- Bakal II Integrated School
- Bulac National High School
- San Pascual Integrated School
- San Ricardo National High School
- Sibul National High School
- Tabacao National High School
- Talavera National High School
- Talavera Senior High School

=== Higher educational institutions ===
- New Horizon Academy
- Nueva Ecija University of Science and Technology
- REH Montessori College
- St. Elizabeth Global College

== Notable personalities ==
- Eduardo del Rosario - 1st Secretary of Human Settlements and Urban Development

== Gallery ==
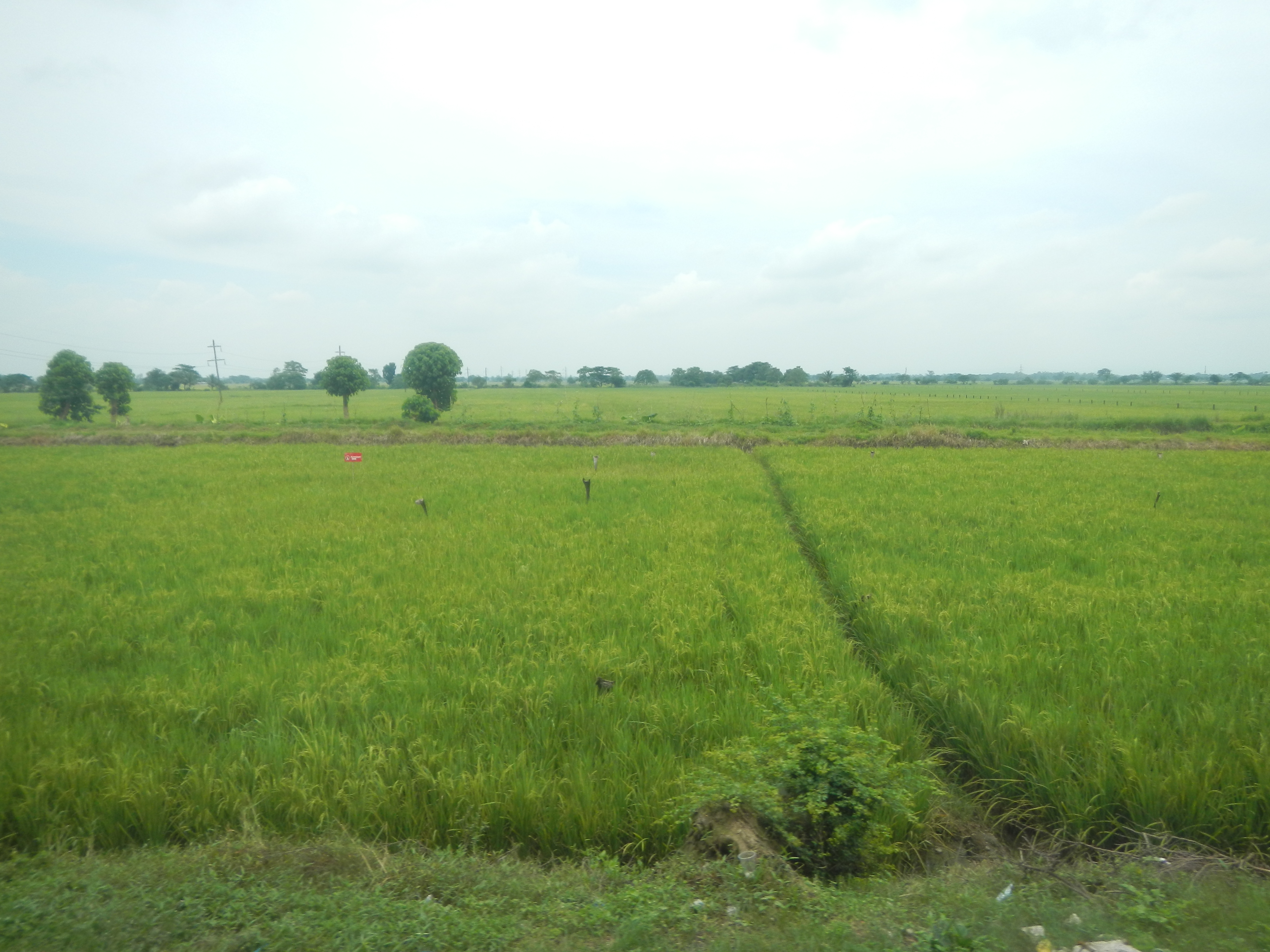
Ricefields

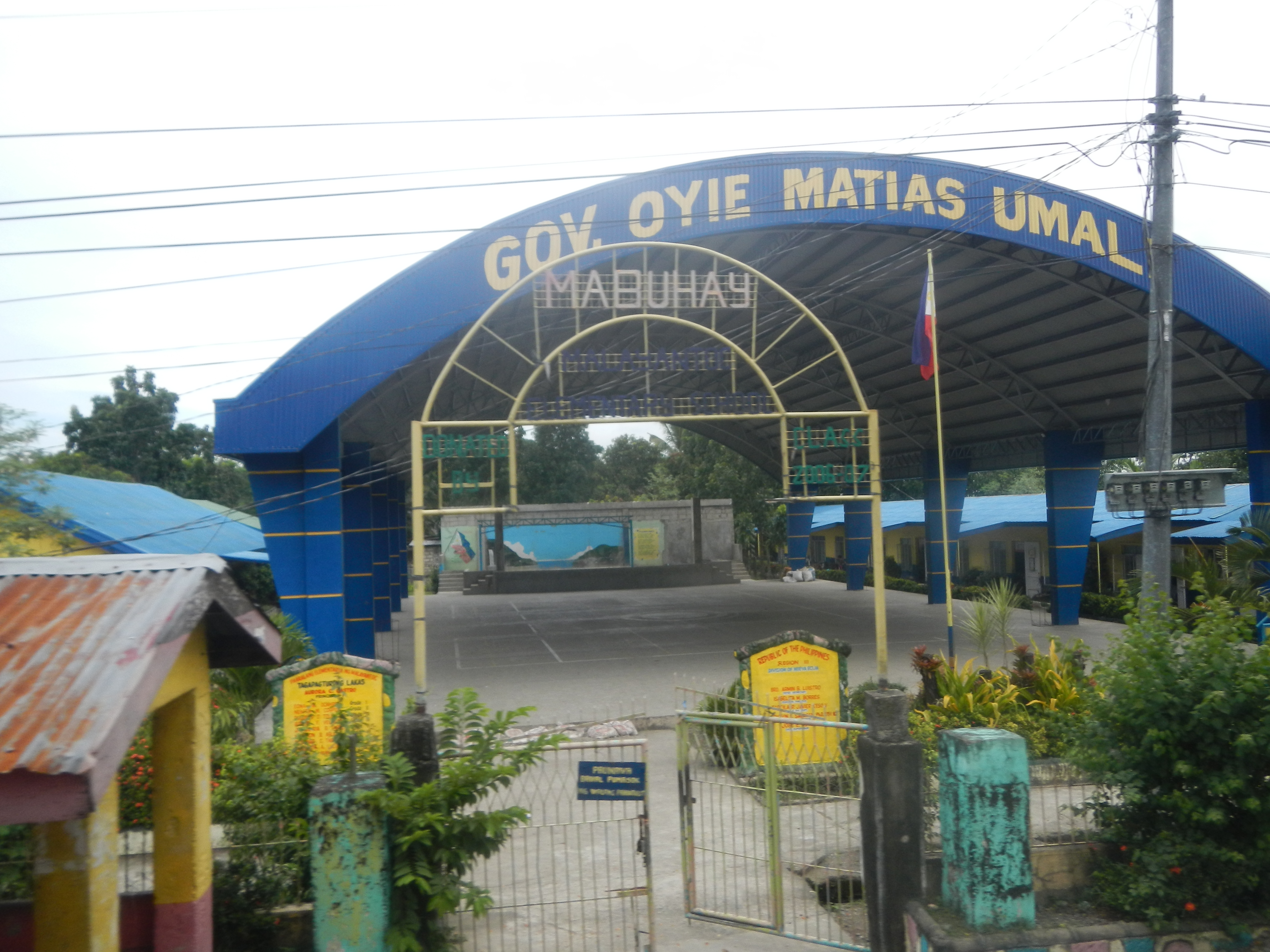
Governor Umali covered courts, gymnasium

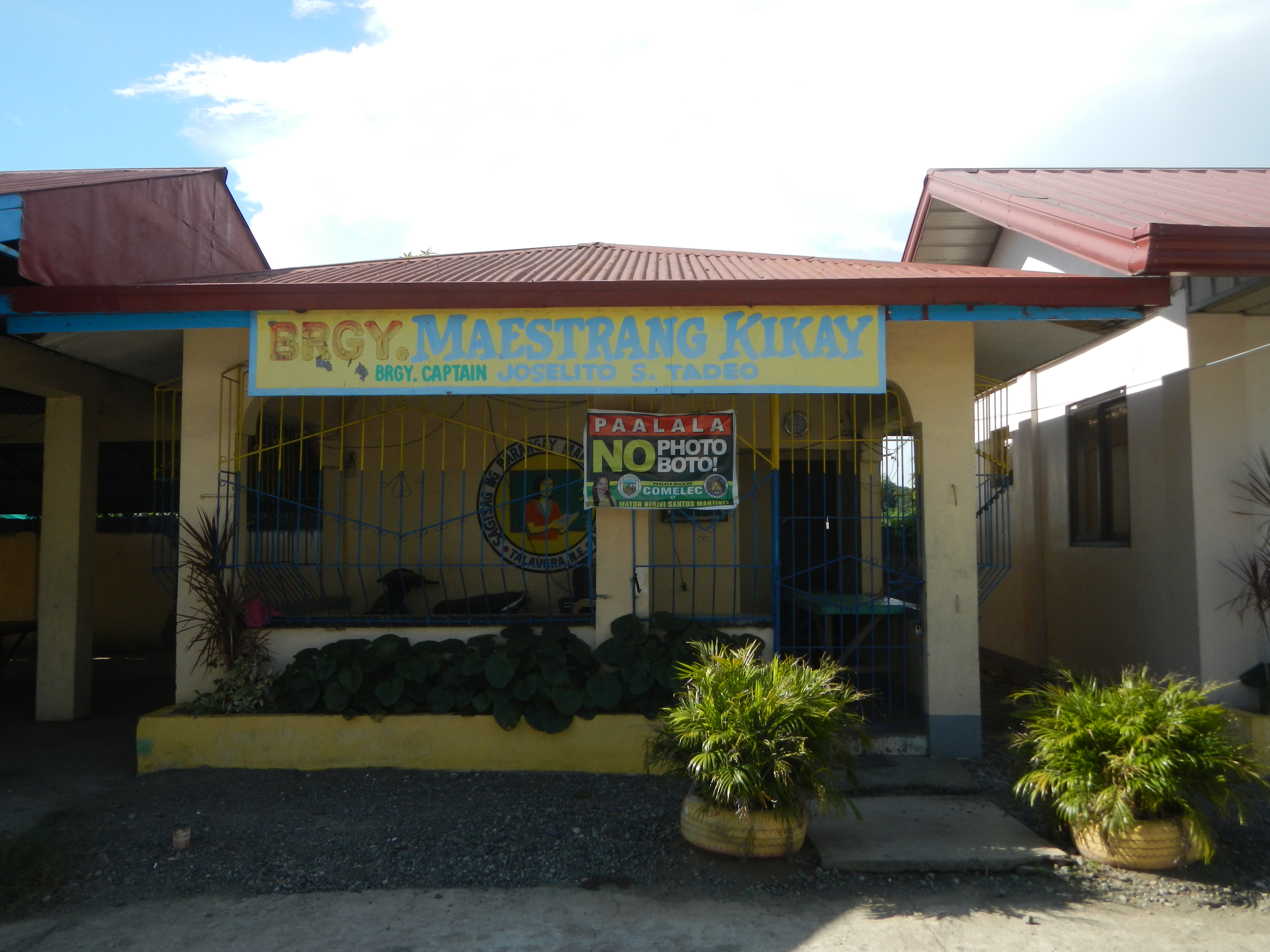
Maestrang Kikay Barangay Hall

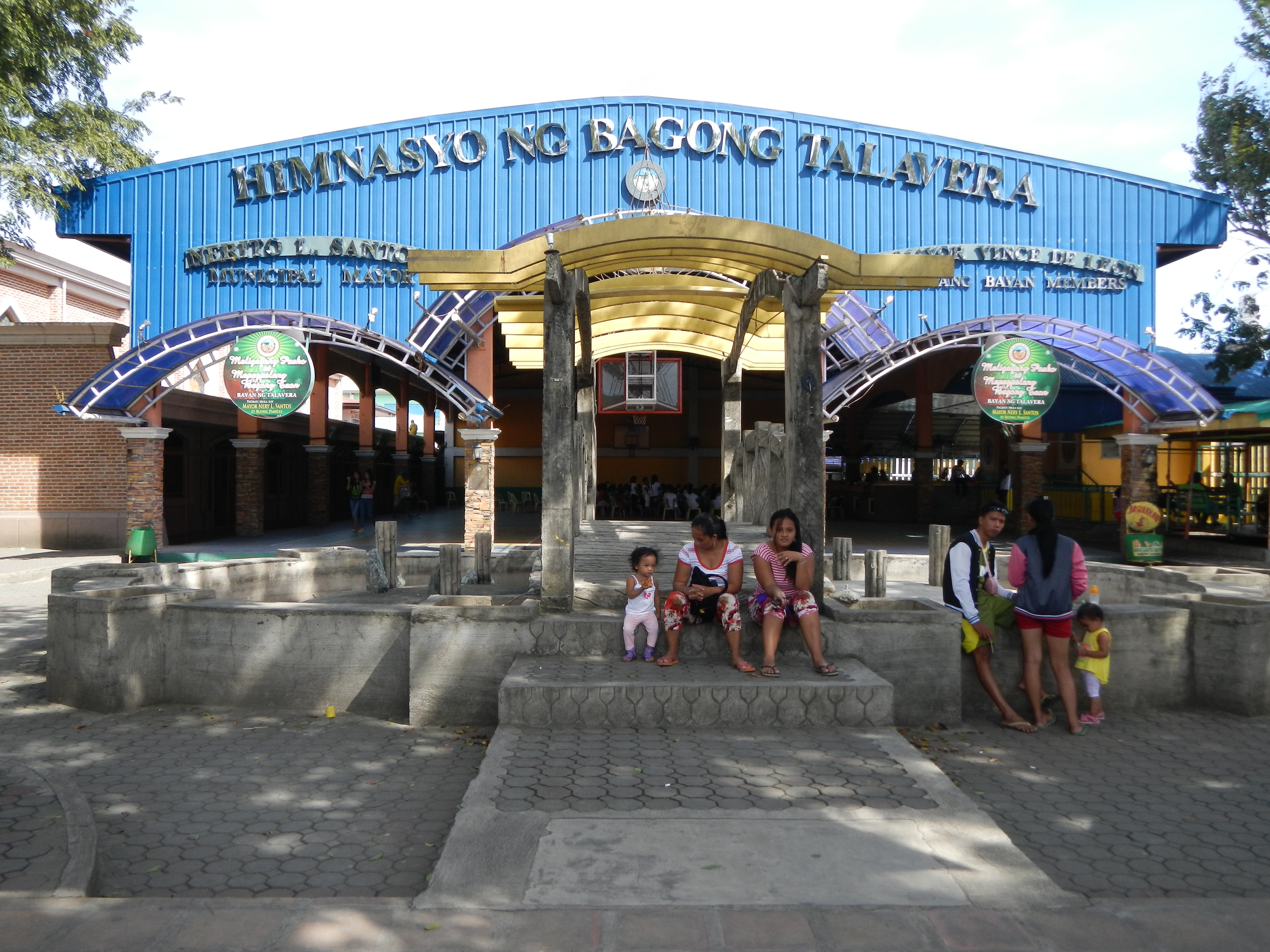
Himnasyo ng Bagong Talavera (lit. transl. Gymnasium of New Talavera)

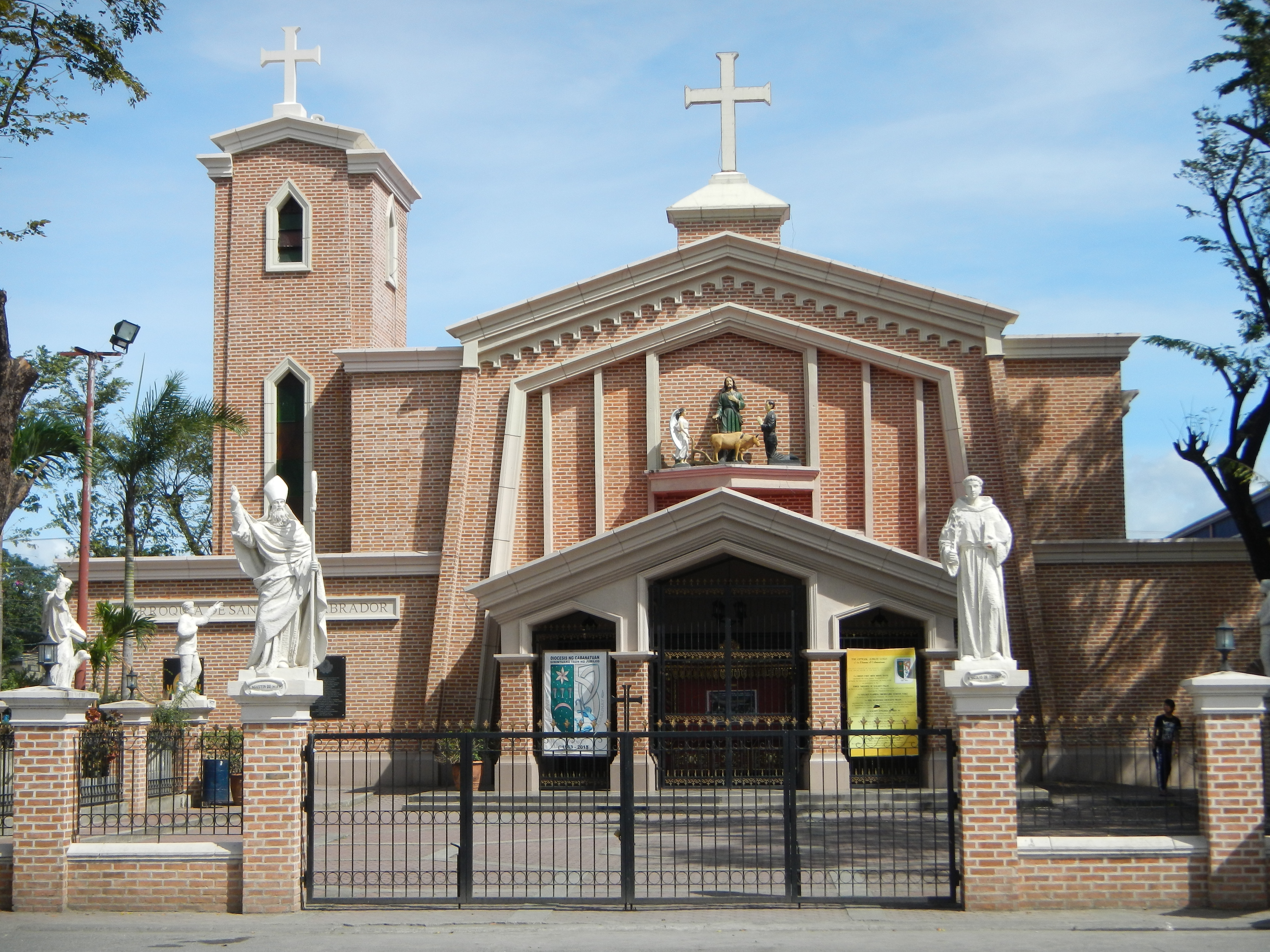
Bell tower of the Diocesan Shrine and Parish of Saint Isidore the Worker
