= Office of the President of the Philippines =

Philippines government agency

- Tanggapan ng Pangulo ng Pilipinas
- Seal

Overview
- Established: De jure: March 22, 1897; 129 years ago Issue date of establishing order: March 20, 1997; 29 years ago
- Country: Philippines
- Leader: Ralph Recto, Executive Secretary; Sec. Benhur Abalos, Cabinet Secretary; Sec. Lino Cayetano, Secretary of the Presidential Communications Office; Sec. Elaine Masukat, Chief of the Presidential Management Staff; Sec. Anna Liza G. Logan, Chief Presidential Legal Counsel; Sec. Antonio Lagdameo Jr., Special Assistant to the President; Sec. Joey Salceda, Secretary of the Presidential Legislative Liaison Office
- Appointed by: President of the Philippines
- Main organ: Cabinet
- Responsible to: President of the Philippines
- Annual budget: ₱8.20 billion (2020)
- Headquarters: Malacañang Palace, San Miguel, Manila
- Website: op-proper.gov.ph (current agency website) pbbm.com.ph (personal presidential website) president.gov.ph (former agency website; archived link)

The Office of the President of the Philippines (OP; also known simply as Office of the President (Filipino: Tanggapan ng Pangulo ng Pilipinas or Tanggapan ng Pangulo) is an administrative, advisory, and consultative government agency of the Philippine government that aids the president in performing their duties as its head and chief of the executive branch of government.

The office is housed within the Malacañang Palace complex in San Miguel, Manila.

== History ==
The Office of the President (OP) was created through Administrative Order No. 322, s. 1997 on March 20, 1997. The order was issued following the submission of position papers by the officials of the Department of History of the University of the Philippines, and the Board of National Historical Institute which conducted deliberations and consultations in four meetings held at the Malacañang Palace from May 5 to June 25, 1997.

The order established the office retroactively to the date of the date of the Tejeros Convention. The convention was held on March 22, 1897, which saw the election of Emilio Aguinaldo as President of the Revolutionary Government of the Philippines.

The OP was abolished after the capture of Aguinaldo in 1901 by the Americans and was reinstated after the proclamation of the Philippine Commonwealth in 1935.

Then-newly elected President Rodrigo Duterte reorganized the OP on June 30, 2016, when he issued his first Executive Order as president.

By 2025, the budget of the OP reached ₱15.8 billion under President Bongbong Marcos, a 461% increase from the ₱2.8 billion OP budget in 2016 under President Benigno Aquino III.

== Powers ==
=== Mandate ===
The Office of the President's mandate is to provide administrative, advisory, consultative and other support services to the President in the latter's exercise of their powers and functions as Head of State and of the Executive Branch.

=== Core function ===
The executive powers of the President under the 1987 Constitution from which the Office of the President mandate emanates, includes among others the President's power of control over all the executive departments, bureaus and offices, as well as the constitutional duty of those executive departments, bureaus, offices, and the Chief Executive to ensure that the laws are faithfully executed. Based on said executive powers of the President, the OP proper would perform the following core functions:

- Respond to the specific needs and requirements of the President to achieve the purposes and objectives of the Office and the other agencies under it which include those under the chairmanship of the President, those under the supervision and control of the President, those under the supervision and control/administrative supervision of the OP, those attached to it for policy and program coordination, and those not placed by law or order creating them under any special department
- Provide advisory or consultative services to the President in such fields and under such conditions as the President may determine
- Provide technical and administrative support on matters concerning development and management, general government administration and internal administration
- Provide direct services to the President and, for this purpose, attend to functions and matters that are personal and pertain to the First Family.

== Attached agencies ==
=== Law enforcement and regulatory agencies ===
- Anti-Red Tape Authority (ARTA)
- Dangerous Drugs Board (DDB)
- National Intelligence Coordinating Agency (NICA)
- National Security Council (NSC)
- Office of the Presidential Adviser on Peace, Reconciliation and Unity (OPAPPRU)
- Office of the Presidential Protocol (OPP)
- Philippine Center on Transnational Crime (PCTC)
- Philippine Competition Commission (PCC)
- Philippine Drug Enforcement Agency (PDEA)
- Philippine Space Agency (PhilSA)
- Presidential Legislative Liaison Office (PLLO)
- Presidential Security Group (PSG)

=== Economic development and special economic zones ===
- Authority of the Freeport Area of Bataan (AFAB)
- Bases Conversion and Development Authority (BCDA)
- Cagayan Special Economic Zone (CSEZ)
- Subic Bay Metropolitan Authority (SBMA)
- Subic-Clark Alliance for Development Council (SCAD)

=== Climate and sustainable development ===
- Climate Change Commission (CCC)
- Mindanao Development Authority (MinDA)
- National Solid Waste Management Commission (NSWMC)

=== Public services and infrastructure ===
- Metropolitan Manila Development Authority (MMDA)
- Metropolitan Waterworks and Sewerage System (MWSS)
- Philippine Postal Corporation (PHLPost)
- Philippine Reclamation Authority (PRA)

=== Socio-economic, arts, culture, education, and sports ===
- Commission on Higher Education (CHED)
- Commission on Filipinos Overseas (CFO)
- Cultural Center of the Philippines (CCP)
- Games and Amusements Board (GAB)
- Film Development Council of the Philippines (FDCP)
- Komisyon sa Wikang Filipino (KWF)
- National Historical Commission of the Philippines (NHCP)
- National Archives of the Philippines (NAP)
- National Commission for Culture and the Arts (NCCA)
- Philippine Charity Sweepstakes Office (PCSO)
- Philippine Racing Commission (PHILRACOM)
- Philippine Sports Commission (PSC)

=== Social welfare ===
- National Commission of Senior Citizens (NCSC)
- National Council on Disability Affairs (NCDA)

=== Media ===
- Movie and Television Review and Classification Board (MTRCB)
- Optical Media Board (OMB)

== Former attached agencies ==
Listed below are agencies that have been abolished, transferred, integrated, merged, reorganized or renamed into the existing attached agencies under the Office of the President and the executive departments of the Philippines.

- Cooperative Development Authority (CDA) – transferred to the Department of Trade and Industry
- Fertilizer and Pesticide Authority (FPA) – transferred to the Department of Agriculture
- Housing and Urban Development Coordinating Council (HUDCC) – abolished, merged with HLURB to establish the DHSUD by virtue of Republic Act No. 11201
- National Anti-Poverty Commission (NAPC) – transferred to the Department of Social Welfare and Development
- National Commission on Indigenous Peoples (NCIP) – transferred to the Department of Social Welfare and Development
- National Commission on Muslim Filipinos (NCMF) – transferred to the Department of the Interior and Local Government
- National Food Authority (NFA) – transferred to the Department of Agriculture
- National Museum (NM) – renamed as National Museum of the Philippines (NMP), reorganized and attached solely to DepEd for budgetary purposes by virtue of Republic Act No. 11333
- National Youth Commission (NYC) – transferred to Department of the Interior and Local Government
- Pasig River Rehabilitation Commission (PRRC) – abolished by virtue of Executive Order No. 93, s. 2019 All Powers and Functions transferred to the Department of Environment and Natural Resources and Manila Bay Task Force.
- Philippine Coconut Authority (PCA) – transferred to the Department of Agriculture
- Philippine Commission on Women (PCW) – transferred to the Department of the Interior and Local Government
- Presidential Commission for the Urban Poor (PCUP) – transferred to the Department of Social Welfare and Development
- Technical Education and Skills Development Authority (TESDA) – transferred to the Department of Trade and Industry
- Presidential Anti-Corruption Commission (PACC) – abolished by virtue of Executive Order No. 1, s. 2022. All powers and functions transferred to the Office of the Deputy Executive Secretary for Legal Affairs.
- Office of the Cabinet Secretary – abolished by virtue of Executive Order No. 1, s. 2022. All powers and functions transferred to the Presidential Management Staff.
- Commission on Information and Communications Technology – abolished by virtue of Executive Order No. 47, s. 2011, merged with DOST-Information and Communications Technology Office and all operating units of the Department of Transportation and Communications (DOTC) with functions and responsibilities dealing with communications to establish the Department of Information and Communications Technology by virtue of Republic Act No. 10844.
- Office of the Presidential Spokesperson – abolished by virtue of Executive Order No. 2, s. 2022. All powers and functions transferred to the Office of the Press Secretary.
- Office of the Press Secretary – renamed as Presidential Communications Operations Office on August 9, 2010 by virtue of Executive Order No. 4, s. 2010 and Presidential Communications Office on December 29, 2022 by virtue of Executive Order No. 11, s. 2022.
- Philippines National Petroleum Commission and safety petroleum diet PNPC-PDP, PNPC-Finance under the President of the Philippines and Philippines Association Advance Petroleum
- Philippine Information Agency (PIA) - transferred to the Presidential Communications Office

== See also ==
- List of presidents of the Philippines
- Office of the Vice President of the Philippines
