= Presidential Legislative Liaison Office =

Philippine government agency

- Tanggapan ng Pampanguluhang Tagapag-ugnay Pambatasan
- Seal

Agency overview
- Formed: 1987
- Jurisdiction: Philippines
- Agency executive: Joey Salceda, Secretary, Presidential Legislative Liaison Office
- Parent department: Office of the President
- Parent agency: Office of the Executive Secretary
- Website: pllo.gov.ph

Secretary of the Presidential Legislative Liaison Office
- Kalihim ng Tanggapan ng Tagapag-ugnay Pampamahalaan sa Lehislatura ng Pangulo

- Incumbent; Joey Salceda since July 20, 2026
- Style: The Honorable
- Member of: Cabinet
- Appointer: The president
- Term length: At the president's pleasure
- Formation: November 11, 1987

The Presidential Legislative Liaison Office (PLLO; Filipino: Tanggapan ng Pampanguluhang Tagapag-ugnay Pambatasan) is a government agency of the Philippines that deals with the relations between the executive and legislative branch of governments. The PLLO coordinates affairs regarding the executive government's legislative agenda with the Congress of the Philippines.

== History ==
The Presidential Legislative Liaison Office (PLLO) was established on November 11, 1987, through Memorandum Order No. 128 issued during the presidency of Corazon Aquino. The issuance was amended by Memorandum Order No. 142 dated December 17, 1987. The latter issuance made effective Memorandum Order No. 128 on July 1, 1987.

The PLLO previously consisted of the Office of the Presidential Adviser for Legislative Affairs (OPALA), that functioned in close coordination with the PLLO. The Presidential Adviser also held a Cabinet-rank position and served as the President’s principal adviser on legislative matters. The position was established to enhance the Executive’s capacity to engage with Congress on key policy initiatives.

=== Marcos, Jr. administration ===
In 2025, President Bongbong Marcos issued Executive Order No. 90, which revamped the Presidential Legislative Liaison Office (PLLO) as part of the administration’s broader rightsizing policy aimed at streamlining government operations. Under EO 90, the PLLO was placed under the supervision and control of the Office of the Executive Secretary, functioning as a unit of the Office of the President. The reorganisation seeks to enhance the PLLO’s operational efficiency and strengthen its capacity to implement and promote the President’s legislative agenda.

A key provision of the reorganization was the abolition of the position of the Presidential Adviser on Legislative Affairs (PALA), with its functions effectively merged into the restructured PLLO. The reorganised PLLO shall be headed by an Undersecretary, assisted by two Assistant Secretaries tasked with liaising separately with the Senate of the Philippines and the House of Representatives of the Philippines.
