= Anti–Red Tape Authority =

Philippine government agency

Agency overview
- Formed: June 26, 2018
- Jurisdiction: Government of the Philippines
- Headquarters: 5th Floor, NFA Building, Visayas Avenue, Diliman, Quezon City
- Motto: Smarter Initiatives. Better Philippines.
- Employees: 216 (2024)
- Annual budget: ₱336.10 million (2022)
- Agency executives: Ernesto V. Perez, Director General; Gerald G. Divinagracia, Deputy Director General; Geneses R. Abot, Deputy Director General; Ricojudge Janvier M. Echiverri, Deputy Director General
- Parent agency: Office of the President of the Philippines
- Website: arta.gov.ph

The Anti–Red Tape Authority (ARTA (Note: Prior to 2018, the acronym "ARTA" may also refer to the Anti–Red Tape Act, which was signed prior to the creation of this agency.)) is a Philippine government agency mandated to ensure ease of business among all agencies of the Philippine government. It was created through Republic Act No. 11032 or the "Ease of Doing Business and Efficient Government Service Delivery Act", which was passed on May 28, 2018. It has since made efforts to streamline and promote digitization of various government services.

The authority investigates complaints of red tape within the government and, depending on findings, recommends subsequent action to be taken by the relevant government agencies. The authority is headed by a director general, who becomes part of the Cabinet of the Philippines, and three deputy directors general. The current director general is Ernesto V. Perez.

== History ==
=== Background ===
Prior to 2007, red tape ran prevalent within government services. Because of the long turnaround time for government services, some government officials, termed fixers, expedited provision of those services in exchange for a fee.

On June 2, 2007, the 13th Congress of the Philippines and former President Gloria Macapagal Arroyo passed the Anti-Red Tape Act of 2007. The act aimed to reduce bureaucratic red tape within the government and reduce the corruption that results from it. The initial implementation of the Anti-Red Tape Act was spearheaded by the Civil Service Commission (CSC) and joined by the Development Academy of the Philippines, the Office of the Ombudsman, and the Presidential Anti-Graft Commission. Its Implementing Rules and Regulations (IRR)—a document defining specifics for the law's implementation—was signed on July 24, 2008.

In 2016, the 8888 Citizen's Complaint Hotline opened to receive reports of poor government front-line service delivery and corrupt practices in government agencies.

=== Creation ===
In an effort to further streamline government services, the 17th Congress of the Philippines and former President Rodrigo Duterte passed the Ease of Doing Business and Efficient Government Service Delivery Act of 2018. The law, passed on May 28, 2018, officially created the Anti-Red Tape Authority as a new attachment of the Office of the President. Ernesto V. Perez was the first appointed official of the agency, being appointed a deputy director general on October 31, 2018, and later officer-in-charge for the authority's Office of the Director General on December 8. The final public hearing for the agency's IRR was held on April 16, 2019, but was blocked from promulgation due to the lack of an appointed director general, who has the sole power to recommend the IRR's approval to the president. In the period between the passing of the original law and the authority's IRR, red tape still remained a problem for businesses in the Philippines. The agency's first director general, Jeremiah Belgica, was appointed by Duterte on July 3, 2019. Subsequently, the IRR of the authority was passed on July 17, 2019, over a year after the agency was first formed.

The Commission on Audit released a report in 2022 about slowdowns in the authority's complaint resolution process. It wrote the first two stages of complaints took an average of 124 days. Ombudsman Martires called to abolish the authority, arguing that the law was unconstitutional as its functions "solely belong to the Office of the Ombudsman." A joint statement of 30 business groups and foreign chambers opposed the proposed abolition of the authority.

On June 2, 2022, Ombudsman Samuel Martires ordered the preventive suspension of Belgica and four other authority officials for six months following a complaint made by Dito Telecommunity Chief Administrative Officer Adel Tamano which accused the authority of giving preferential treatment to Now Telecom. The Office of the President implemented the suspension on June 7. Perez returned as director general officer-in-charge for the authority on June 11. He was later appointed by President Bongbong Marcos as the authority's new permanent director general on November 14, 2022, replacing Belgica. On March 3, 2023, the Ombudsman found the suspended officials guilty of grave misconduct; they were dismissed, disqualified from holding public office, and stripped of retirement benefits. The officials who were removed from position prior to the conviction (which included Belgica) were ordered to pay a fine equal to one year of their salary.

== Activities ==
Prior to the approval of its IRR, the authority already began enforcing the Ease of Doing Business Act. The authority actively promotes the digitization of government services, especially in the wake of the COVID-19 pandemic which already pushed government services to use digital platforms. The authority also aims to enforce a maximum processing time for government services: 3 days for simple transactions, 7 days for complex transactions, and 20 days for highly technical transactions.

Among the first orders by the authority was to compel the Land Transportation Franchising and Regulatory Board (LFTRB) on July 24 to explain irregularities committed by the board, which included delays and issues related to the approval of Transport Network Vehicle Service (TNVS) drivers applications. The authority later ordered the LTFRB to automatically approve all valid applications. As a result of orders from the authority, the LTFRB launched an online portal for TNVS drivers on October 24.

From the start of its operations until June 2021, the authority has expedited the release of over 35 thousand permits to various government agencies, with the majority of permits coming from the telecommunications sector.

=== Complaints ===
Prior to the approval of its IRR, the authority already began accepting and resolving complaints of red tape from businesses and individuals. From the start of its operations until June 2021, the authority received 1,178 complaints, of which 537 were resolved. The authority opened an online complaint management system in 2022, allowing citizens to submit complaints through the internet. Following a memorandum of agreement signed in February 2023, government agencies were now required to respond to complaints of poor service submitted by citizens within 72 hours. The 8888 hotline was also given the power to act as complainant for these cases. In 2023, the authority claimed that it had resolved over 98% of the complaints it had received.

=== Business One Stop Shop ===
The authority was mandated by the Ease of Doing Business (EODB) Act to ensure the creation of Business One Stop Shop (BOSS) services within local government units (LGUs). Local government units were required to set up a single window where this service would be rendered. The deadline for the creation of these services was on June 17, 2021—three years after the EODB Act was signed.

As part of its digitization efforts, the authority also pushed LGUs to set up an electronic BOSS (e-BOSS) system, where citizens can file and be issued government documents online. For municipalities without the budget to develop their own systems, the authority, partnered with the Department of Information and Communications Technology (DICT), offered DICT-developed software free of charge. By March 2022, only 13% of LGUs had an operational e-BOSS system. To aid in digitization, the authority partnered with Meralco to provide 500 computers to LGUs and with telecommunications companies to provide internet connections in isolated areas that have no connectivity.

== Organization ==
The authority is headed by a director general and three deputy directors general. The Director General is a member of the Cabinet of the Philippines. Three deputy directors general head three different top offices of the authority: administration and finance, legal, and operations.

List of Directors General
#	Name	Tenure	Duration	Appointed by
1	Jeremiah Belgica	July 3, 2019–November 14, 2022 (Note: Belgica was suspended for a duration of six months beginning June 7, 2022. Perez became officer-in-charge for his position starting June 11. He was removed from position during his suspension.)	1,230 days	Rodrigo Duterte
2	Ernesto V. Perez	November 14, 2022–present	—N/a	Bongbong Marcos
