= Department of Youth and Sports Development =

Former Philippine government department

The Department of Youth and Sports Development (later the Ministry of Youth and Sports Development) was an executive department of the Philippine government that dealt with sports and youth-related affairs in the country.

Currently, the Philippine Sports Commission is the body responsible for government initiated effort in sports and assists the privately run Philippine Olympic Committee.

== History ==
The Department of Youth and Sports Development (DYSD) was created upon the approval of Presidential Decree No. 604 issued by then President Ferdinand Marcos on December 10, 1974. This led to the abolishing of the Philippine Amateur Athletic Federation in 1975 with the Philippine Olympic Committee succeeding the PAAF.

The government body was renamed as the Ministry of Youth and Sports Development (MYSD) when the country adopted a parliamentary form of government. Through a letter of instructions issued by President Marcos on October 31, 1979, the MYSD implemented the Project Gintong Alay sports program.

Upon the enactment of the Education Act of 1982, the MYSD was integrated with the Ministry of Education and Culture (MECS) on May 26, 1982 through Executive Order No. 805, which later became the Department of Education and Culture (DECS) through the 1987 Constitution. Republic Act 6847 created the Philippine Sports Commission and the DECS became the Department of Education.

== Proposed revival ==
On February 26, 2016, a press release from the Philippine House of Representatives indicates that the creation of a Department of Sports in the Philippines has been filed to improve the state of sports in the country. Rep. Karlo Alexei B. Nograles, chairman of the House committee on Labor and Employment, proposed House Bill 6440 (Department of Sports Act) to address the issues surrounding Philippine sports.

The proposed Department of Sports, as indicated in the press release, will be "a cabinet-level agency to provide leadership in the promotion and development of sports in the country and set the parameters to address the needs of athletes, coaches, trainers and sports officials". The department will also aim to create policies that will improve the country's performance in international sport competitions.

In the press release, Rep. Nograles said, "It is now high time for the government to prioritize sports in the national agenda, and consider sports as an integral factor in nation building." Nograles believes that the PSC has not done well in improving the sports in the country, stating, "After more than 20 years since the creation of the PSC, the state of Philippine sports appears to have worsened rather than improved.”

His proposal includes the abolishment of the PSC, and contrariwise, provides the development of the Amateur Sports Development Bureau (ASDB), which has the primary task in the promotion and development of amateur sports in the country. Likewise, The Grassroots Sport Division and Local and National Sports Competition Division shall be established under the department. Moreover, the International Sports Development Bureau will also be constructed, and will be composed of the National Sports Association Affairs Division and the International Sports Competition Division.

In November 2017, the House of Representatives created a technical working group to facilitates measures on establishment of the department amidst pertinent pending bills.
