= Secretary of Human Settlements and Urban Development =

Government post in the Philippines

- Kalihim ng Pananahanang Pantao at Pagpapaunlad ng Kalunsuran
- Official seal of the Department of Human Settlements and Urban Development

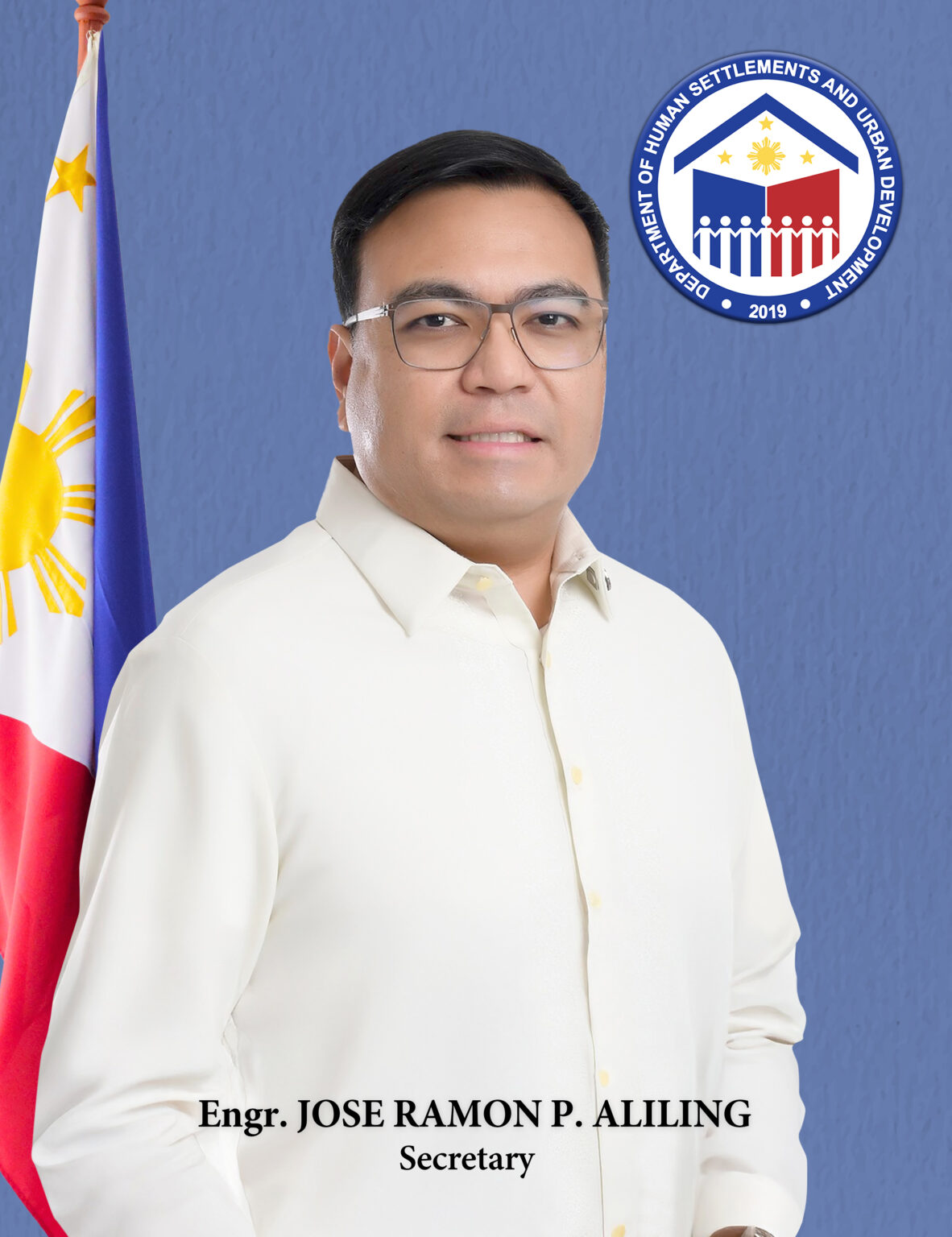
- Incumbent; Jose Ramon Aliling since May 23, 2025
- Style: The Honorable
- Member of: Cabinet
- Appointer: The president with the consent of the Commission on Appointments
- Term length: At the president's pleasure
- Inaugural holder: Eduardo del Rosario
- Formation: January 1, 2020
- Website: www.dhsud.gov.ph

The secretary of human settlements and urban development (Filipino: Kalihim ng Pananahanang Pantao at Pagpapaunlad ng Kalunsuran) is the member of the Cabinet of the Philippines in charge of the Department of Human Settlements and Urban Development.

The current secretary is Jose Ramon Aliling.

== Functions ==
The Secretary of Human Settlements and Urban Development has the following functions:

- Advise the president on housing, human settlements, and rural and urban development;
- Establish policies and standards for the department's operations;
- Promulgate rules, regulations and other issuances;
- Exercise control, supervision, and disciplinary powers over officers and employees of the department and the attached agencies;
- Designate and appoint officers and employees of the department, excluding the undersecretaries, assistant secretaries, and regional and assistant regional directors;
- Coordinate with other agencies and instrumentalities of the government for the implementation of housing and urban development programs;
- Formulate rules and regulations and exercise other powers for the implementation of the Department of Human Settlements and Urban Development Act; and
- Perform other functions provided by law or assigned by the president.

The Secretary of Human Settlements and Urban Development is also a voting member of the National Economic and Development Authority and the governing boards of the Climate Change Commission, the National Disaster Risk Reduction and Management Council and the National Land Use Committee.

== List of secretaries ==
Portrait	Name (Birth–Death)	Took office	Left office	President
	Eduardo del Rosario (born 1956)	January 2, 2020	June 30, 2022	Rodrigo Duterte
	Melissa Ardanas; Officer in Charge	June 30, 2022	July 29, 2022	Bongbong Marcos
	Jose Acuzar (born 1955)	July 29, 2022	May 22, 2025	Bongbong Marcos
	Jose Ramon Aliling	May 23, 2025	Incumbent	Bongbong Marcos
