= Pag-IBIG Fund =

National savings program government corporation in the Philippines

Home Development Mutual Fund
- Trade name: Pag-IBIG Fund
- Type: Government-owned and controlled corporation (GOCC)
- Industry: Financial services
- Founded: June 11, 1978; 48 years ago
- Headquarters: Petron Megaplaza, Makati, Philippines
- Key people: Marilene C. Acosta, President and CEO
- Services: Loan, mortgage, deposit account
- Parent: Department of Human Settlements and Urban Development
- Website: www.pagibigfund.gov.ph

The Home Development Mutual Fund (HDMF; Filipino: Pondong Tulungan sa Pagpapaunlad ng Pabahay), commonly known as the Pag-IBIG Fund (acronym of its Filipino name: Pagtutulungan sa Kinabukasan: Ikaw, Bangko, Industriya at Gobyerno), (Note: lit. 'Cooperation for the Future: You, the Bank, the Industry, and the Government') is a government-owned and controlled corporation under the Department of Human Settlements and Urban Development of the Philippines responsible for the administration of the national savings program and affordable shelter financing for Filipinos.

== History ==
Pag-IBIG Fund was founded by virtue of Presidential Decree No. 1530 which was signed by President Ferdinand E. Marcos on June 11, 1978, to answer the national need for savings program and affordable housing financing. Its original purpose was solely as a provident fund to encourage savings among Filipinos. By March 1979, the fund was administered by the National Home Mortgage Finance Corporation (NHMFC), a government corporation mandated to increase availability of housing loans to Filipino workers.

By June, HDMF was implemented by virtue of Executive Order No. 538. Emily Abinoja, Norma Salud, and Marilou Adea, the vice president of the Shelter Savings Group (SSG), an arm of NHMFC, formed a team to conduct a study of the Central Provident Fund, Singapore's national savings program, with the objective of modeling its fund structure. The team received support from advertising agency J. Romero & Associates that came up with the acronym Pag-IBIG, from actuaries Enrique Zalamea and Leo Tan, from Kapisanan ng mga Brodkaster ng Pilipinas (KBP) that disseminated information about HDMF across the country, from Technology Resource Center that provided computer facilities, and from Development Bank of the Philippines that offered the initial mortgage lending facilities.

When the fund was launched in the midst of martial law, it was opposed by the public and across sectors of society. Its functions were decried as a duplicate to the functions of Social Security System and Government Service Insurance System. The required contribution was described by the labor sector as oppressive, by employers that opposed to any additional contribution in behalf of workers, and by the academe as a representation of injustice of the incumbent Marcos regime.

On December 14, 1980, Presidential Decree No. 1752 was passed that amended the act creating the Home Development Mutual Fund. Specifically, the decree contained the following distinct features:

- Establishing HDMF as a fund owned by members, with the government serving as its trustee and guarantor
- Setting the mandatory coverage at 1–3% of contribution of no more than ₱3,000 per month salary base.

== Membership ==
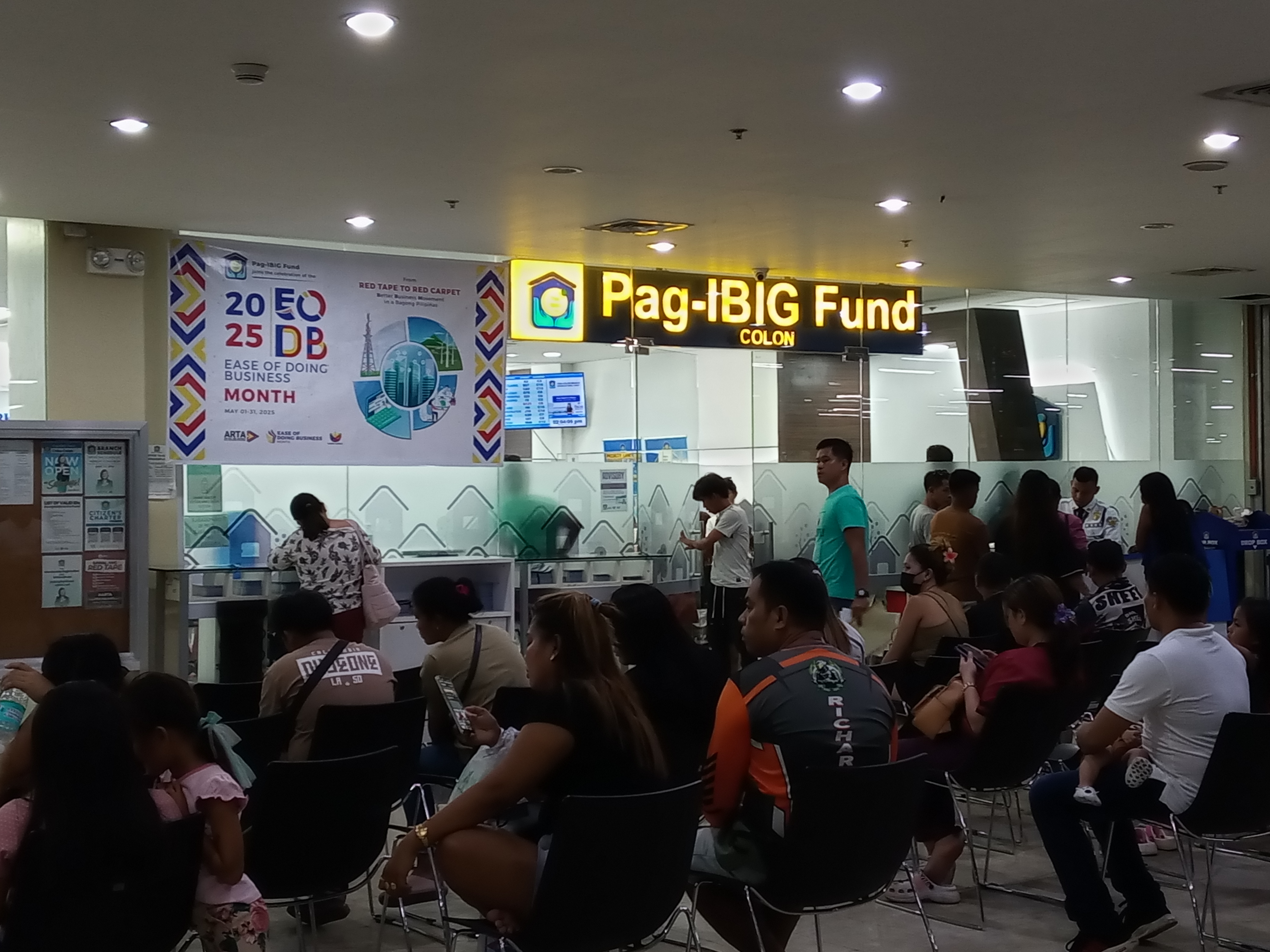
Pag-IBIG Fund branch at Gaisano Capital South, Cebu City

In 2009, Republic Act No. 9679, otherwise known as Home Development Mutual Fund Law of 2009, was passed into law. It expanded coverage requiring mandatory membership of all employees regardless of status, which would include self-employed persons, regardless of trade, business or occupation with an income salary of at least ₱1,000. It also included overseas Filipino workers and voluntary membership available to all Filipino immigrants, Filipinos naturalized in other countries, and permanent Filipino residents abroad.

Membership to the fund is exclusive to all Filipino citizens who are or ought to be covered by the Social Security System (SSS), provided that actual membership in the SSS shall not be a condition precedent to the mandatory coverage in the fund. It shall include, but are not limited to:

- A private employee, whether permanent, temporary, or provisional who is not over sixty years old;
- A household helper earning at least ₱1,000 a month. A household helper is any person who renders domestic services exclusively to a household such as a driver, gardener, cook, governess, and other similar occupations;
- A Filipino seafarer upon the signing of the standard contract of employment between the seafarer and the manning agency, which together with the foreign ship owner, acts as the employer;
- A self-employed person regardless of trade, business or occupation, with an income of at least ₱1,000.00 a month and not over sixty years old;
- An expatriate who is not more than sixty years old and is compulsorily covered by the Social Security System (SSS), regardless of citizenship, nature and duration of employment, and the manner by which the compensation is paid. In the absence of an explicit exemption from SSS coverage, the said expatriate, upon assumption of office, shall be covered by the Fund.
- An expatriate shall refer to a citizen of another country who is living and working in the Philippines.
- All employees who are subject to mandatory coverage by the Government Service Insurance System (GSIS), regardless of their status of appointment, including members of the judiciary and constitutional commissions;
- Uniformed members of the Armed Forces of the Philippines, the Bureau of Fire Protection, the Bureau of Jail Management and Penology, and the Philippine National Police;
- Filipinos employed by foreign-based employers, whether they are deployed locally or abroad or a combination thereof.

=== Voluntary membership ===
Membership is also extended to individuals of at least 18 years old but not more than 65 years old under their voluntary membership program, developed house and or family home are assessed but not valued for taxing itself the citizen. However, the said individual shall be required to comply with the set of rules and regulations for Pag-IBIG members including the amount of contribution and schedule of payment. In addition, they shall be subject to the eligibility requirements in the event of availment of loans and other programs/benefits offered by the Fund.

The following shall be allowed to apply for voluntary membership:

- Non-working spouses who devote full-time to managing the household and family affairs, unless they also engage in another vocation or employment which is subject to mandatory coverage, provided the employed spouse is a registered Pag-IBIG member and consents to the Fund membership of the non-working spouse;
- Filipino employees of foreign government or international organization, or their wholly owned instrumentality based in the Philippines, in the absence of an administrative agreement with the Fund;
- Employees of an employer who is granted a waiver or suspension of coverage by the Fund under RA 9679;
- Leaders and members of religious groups;
- A member separated from employment, local or abroad, or ceased to be self-employed but would like to continue paying his/her personal contribution. Such member may be a pensioner, investor, or any other individual with passive income or allowances;
- Public officials or employees who are not covered by the GSIS such as Barangay Officials, including Barangay Chairmen, Barangay Council Members, Chairmen of the Barangay Sangguniang Kabataan, and Barangay Secretaries and Treasurers;
- Such other earning individuals/groups as may be determined by the Board by rules and regulations.

== Benefits of the fund ==
=== Housing Loan ===
Most popular program benefit of the Pag-IBIG Fund offers assistance to its members by providing affordable financing for their housing needs. HDMF accomplishes this by working in partnership with the local Real Estate Developers and arranging affordable loans to real estate buyers (Pag-IBIG members).

The loan had a lower interest rate compared to the prevailing rate in the market and payable in longer terms. Pag-IBIG Fund offers a home loan at a low interest rate of 4.5% (for ₱450,000 loan) with a loan term of up to 30 years. A qualified member can get a maximum loan amount of up to ₱6 million.

=== Short Term Loan ===
Similar to the Government Service Insurance System (GSIS) and Social Security System, the HDMF also offers financial assistance to qualified member by granting short term loan. There are two types of loans members are qualified to avail:

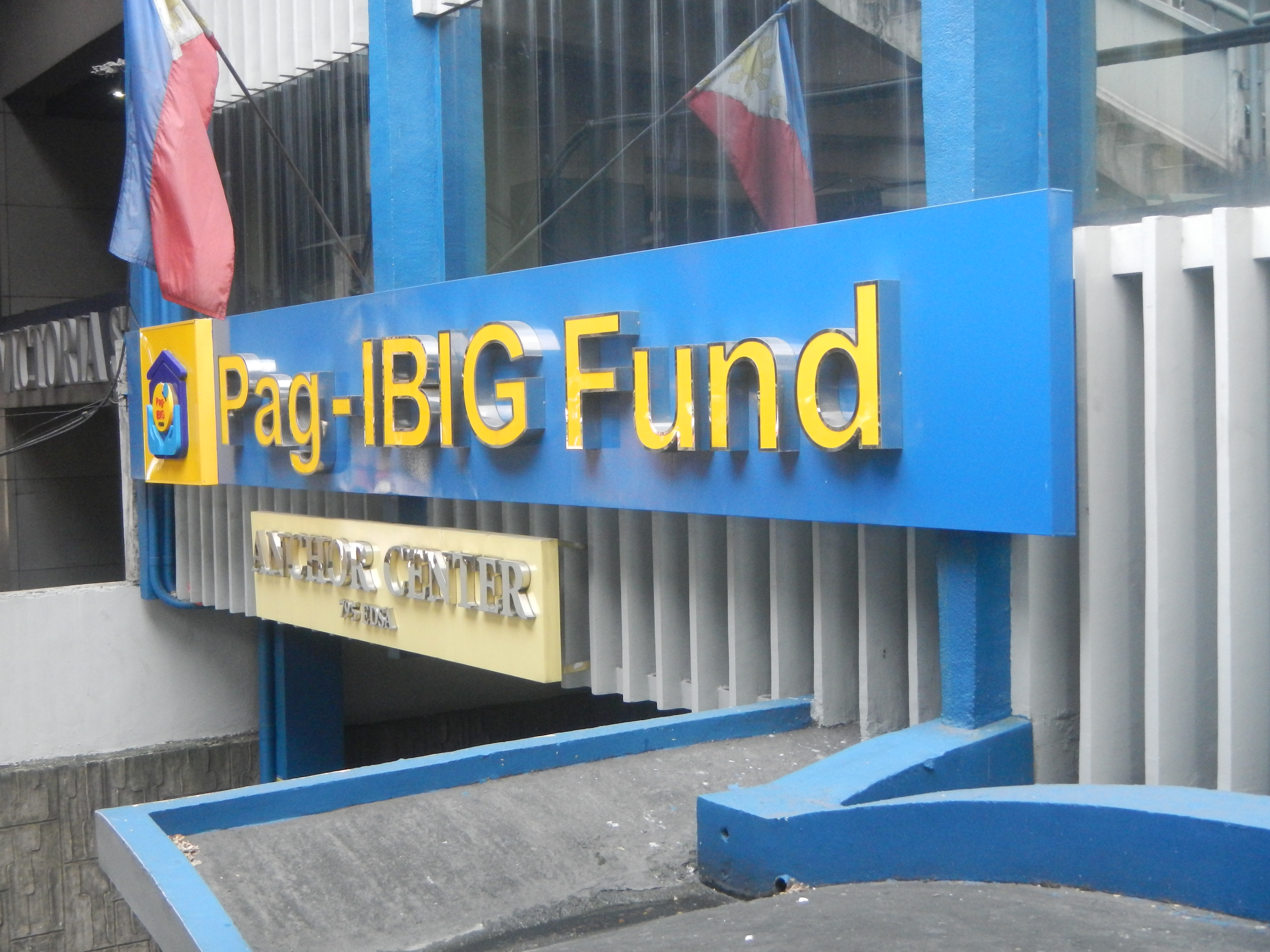
Anchor Center (EDSA, Quezon City)

==== Multi-Purpose Loan (MPL) ====
This program aims to provide financial assistance to members for house repair, minor home improvement, home enhancement, tuition or educational expenses, health and wellness, livelihood; or other purposes. To avail the program, a member must made at least twenty-four month membership savings, or the total savings is equivalent to twenty-four membership savings and must have at least one contribution within the last six months as of month prior to date of loan application.

For members who have withdrawn their contributions due to membership maturity, the reckoning date of the updated 24 contributions shall be the first contribution following the month the member qualified to withdraw his MS due to membership maturity. If a member has an existing Pag-IBIG Housing Loan, the account must not be in default as of date of application. Should a member have an existing multi-purpose and/or calamity loan, the account/s must not be in default as of date of application.

==== Calamity Loan ====
For members affected by unforeseen calamity like flood, fire, tropical cyclones/typhoons, volcanic eruption and other similar cases. Members can borrow up to 80% of their Total Accumulated Value (TAV) subject to the terms and conditions of the program. Calamity Loan Interest rate is 5.95% per annum. The loan is amortized over 24 months, with a grace period of 3 months. Paying period begins on the 4th month following their check date.

=== Provident Savings ===
Membership contributions to the Pag-IBIG fund is a member's individual savings, which a member can withdraw at the maturity date. Pag-IBIG Fund makes clear that members' contributions, plus that their employer will earn dividend. All that money, called Total Accumulated Value (contributions plus dividend) can be withdrawn when it reaches maturity or 240 months of contributions for at least 45 years old. Unlike the money in a bank regular savings where the interest rate is given, member's earnings in the fund is not readily foreseen ahead of time. It essentially participating in an investment and membership earnings will depend on the overall performance of that investment.

=== Pag-IBIG MPII ===
Launched In 2010, Pag-IBIG MPII, Modified Pag-IBIG II, or simply MP2 is a government-backed voluntary savings program that provides tax-free annual dividend, which is 50 basis points higher than those given to the mandatory, regular membership. Dividend varies annually and is determined according to the fund's financial performance for the said year. It has a five-year term that requires a minimal requirement of ₱500 and without any maximum capital ceiling. Contributions can be made through various payment channels or via salary deduction through employer arrangement.
