= Jose Ramon Aliling =

Filipino businessman

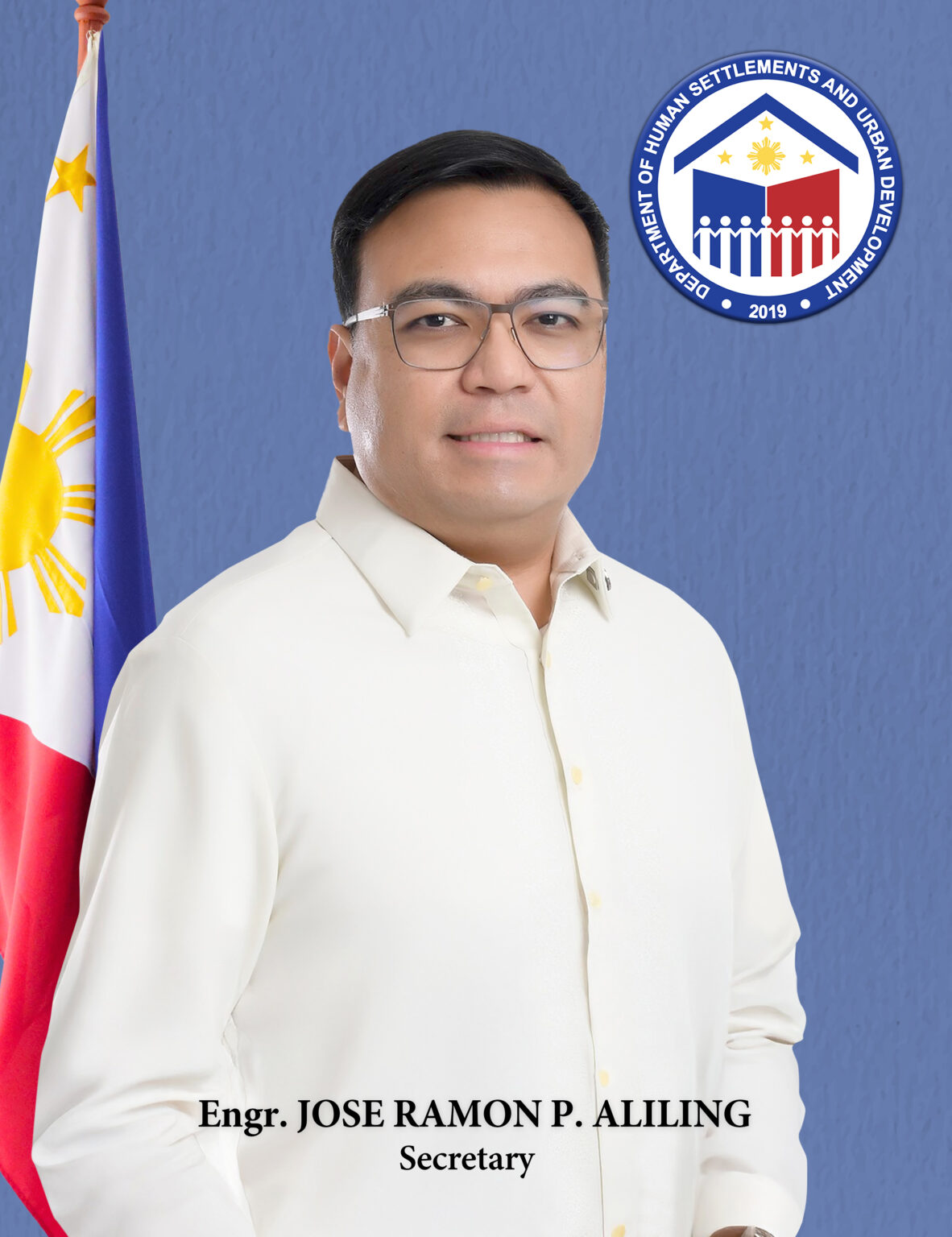
- Aliling in 2025

3rd Secretary of Human Settlements and Urban Development
- Incumbent
- Assumed office May 26, 2025
- President: Bongbong Marcos
- Preceded by: Jose Acuzar

Undersecretary at the Department of Human Settlements and Urban Development
- In office September 22, 2022 – May 25, 2025

Personal details
- Born: Jose Ramon P. Aliling
- Education: De La Salle University (BS)
- Occupation: Civil engineer; businessman
- Awards: The Outstanding Young Men (TOYM) for Engineering (2015)

Jose Ramon "Ping" P. Aliling is a Filipino civil engineer and businessman who has served as the third secretary of human settlements and urban development since 2025. He is concurrently the president and chief executive officer (CEO) of the construction firm Jose Aliling Construction Management Group (JACMI).

A graduate of De La Salle University, Aliling became the CEO of JACMI in 2007. He entered the Department of Human Settlements and Urban Development in 2022 as an undersecretary, during which he promoted professional and social development programs. President Bongbong Marcos appointed him as the department's secretary in May 2025, during a major cabinet reshuffle.

== Early life and career ==
Aliling attended De La Salle University, where he obtained a degree in civil engineering in 2002. After graduating, Aliling joined the Jose Aliling Construction Management Group, which his father founded in 2003. He took over the company as chief executive officer (CEO) and president in 2007. The Jose Aliling Construction Management Inc. (JACMI) has since managed several projects, including the Shangri-La Resort and Spa in Boracay, Marco Polo Ortigas Manila, and Trinoma. At age 26, he served as the youngest board adviser for the DLSU College of Engineering, becoming the youngest person to assume the role. At age 29, he became the youngest President of the Construction Project Management Association of the Philippines.

He introduced a customized Construction Management Manual and software platform that allowed for live video streaming from construction sites and real-time monitoring of project documents.

== Undersecretary of Human Settlements and Urban Development (2022–2025) ==
On September 26, 2022, President Bongbong Marcos appointed Aliling as an undersecretary at the Department of Human Settlements and Urban Development (DHSUD). He was tasked to focus on "construction management, engineering, and technical requirements" of the department's projects. He also oversaw housing programs and urban development initiatives.

During his tenure, Aliling has promoted professional and social development programs, including the “Probinsyanong Inhinyero” initiative, which supports engineering graduates from rural provinces. He has also contributed to various community efforts, including school support programs, church renovations, and health-related charitable events.

== Secretary of Human Settlements and Urban Development (since 2025) ==
=== Appointment and confirmation ===
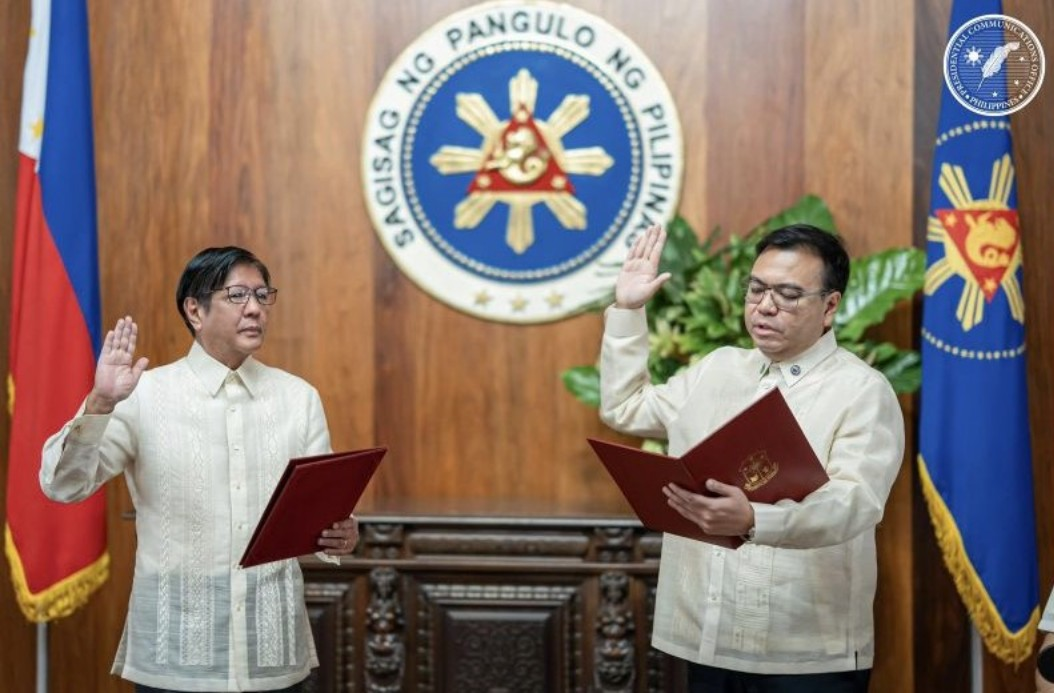
Aliling being sworn in as secretary by President Bongbong Marcos on May 29, 2025

On May 23, 2025, President Marcos appointed Aliling as secretary of human settlements and urban development, succeeding Jose Acuzar as part of a major cabinet reshuffle. Marcos cited an "underdelivery" with the department's targets as the reason for replacing Acuzar with Aliling.

During proceedings for his confirmation, he laid out plans for an expansion of the department's Pambansang Pabahay Para sa Pilipino Program (lit. 'National Housing for Filipinos Program'; 4PH) mass housing program through the incorporation of "horizontal developments", "rental schemes", and "rehousing initiatives". The Commission on Appointments approved his appointment without major debate on June 11.

=== Tenure ===
Aliling assumed the position on May 26, 2025, in an ad interim capacity. Upon assuming office, he pledged to fully digitalize DHSUD's services before the end of the Marcos administration in 2028.

== Awards and recognition ==
Aliling was awarded The Outstanding Young Men (TOYM) of the Philippines in 2015 for civil engineering. He is the first civil engineer to receive this award in the category since the TOYM program began in 1959. In 2021, he received the Lasallian Achievement Award from the De La Salle Alumni Association for his professional accomplishments.
