= Jose Acuzar =

Filipino businessman (born 1955)

José Acuzar
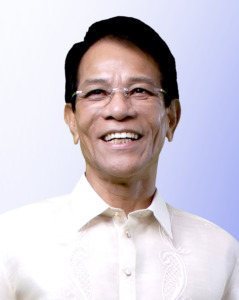
- Official portrait, 2024

Presidential Adviser for Pasig River Rehabilitation
- Incumbent
- Assumed office May 23, 2025
- President: Bongbong Marcos

2nd Secretary of Human Settlements and Urban Development
- In office July 29, 2022 – May 22, 2025
- President: Bongbong Marcos
- Preceded by: Eduardo del Rosario; Melissa A. Aradanas (OIC)
- Succeeded by: Jose Ramon Aliling

Personal details
- Born: Jose Rizalino Acuzar; June 19, 1955 (age 71) Balanga, Bataan, Philippines
- Spouse: Maria Theresa Ochoa
- Children: 7
- Education: Technological Institute of the Philippines (B.S.)
- Occupation: Business executive

José Rizalino "Jerry" Acuzar (born June 19, 1955) is a Filipino business executive and government official who has served as the presidential adviser for Pasig River rehabilitation since May 2025. He previously served as the second secretary of human settlements and urban development from 2022 to 2025 under President Bongbong Marcos. He is also the founder of New San Jose Builders.

== Early life and education ==
Jose "Jerry" Acuzar was born on June 19, 1955, in Balanga, Bataan. His parents were Marcelino A. Acuzar and Maria Larión.

He finished his primary education at the Balanga Elementary School in 1967 and completed his secondary education at the Arellano Memorial (Bataan) High School (now Bataan National High School) in 1974. He finished a vocational course in drafting at the Bataan National School of Arts and Trades (BNSAT) in Balanga (now the Bataan Peninsula State University). He obtained a college degree in architecture at the Technological Institute of the Philippines in 1983.

== Business career ==
While attending BNSAT, Acuzar worked as a cutter-welder in the iron works shop owned by his older brother. He later set up his own iron works shop in Quezon City.

Acuzar also was employed as a draftsman for the Tondo Foreshore Redevelopment Project in 1975. He worked as a contractor in the 1980s before establishing the real estate firm New San Jose Builders, Inc. (NSJBI) in 1986. NSJBI is known for developing residential and commercial condominiums as well as the Philippine Arena.

He is also known for the development of the Las Casas Filipinas de Acuzar in Bataan, a resort known for its Spanish colonial-era buildings transplanted from elsewhere.

== Political career ==
=== Housing secretary (2022–2025) ===
On July 29, 2022, Acuzar was appointed as secretary of human settlements and urban development by President Bongbong Marcos. He is the second secretary of the executive department, succeeding Eduardo del Rosario.

As housing secretary, Acuzar led the multi-agency project Pasig Bigyan Buhay Muli of First Lady Liza Araneta-Marcos. He also pledged to build 1 million houses a year under the government's Pambansang Pabahay para sa Pilipino (4PHs) program.

On May 22, 2025, President Marcos ordered members of his cabinet to tender their courtesy resignations in the aftermath of the May 12, 2025 midterm elections. Acuzar complied with this order.

=== Presidential Adviser for Pasig River Rehabilitation (since 2025) ===
On May 23, 2025, it was announced that Acuzar would be appointed as presidential adviser for Pasig River development, with the rank of secretary. His transfer was attributed by the government to "underdelivery" as housing secretary.

== Personal life ==
Acuzar is married to Maria Theresa Ochoa, the sister of former executive secretary Paquito Ochoa Jr.

Political offices
Preceded by Melissa Ardanas as OIC	Secretary of Human Settlements and Urban Development; 2022–2025	Succeeded by Jose Ramon Aliling
New office	Presidential Adviser for Pasig River Rehabilitation; 2025-present	Incumbent
