= Department of Human Settlements and Urban Development =

Executive department of the Philippine government

- Kagawaran ng Pananahanang Pantao at Pagpapaunlad ng Kalunsuran
- Seal of the department

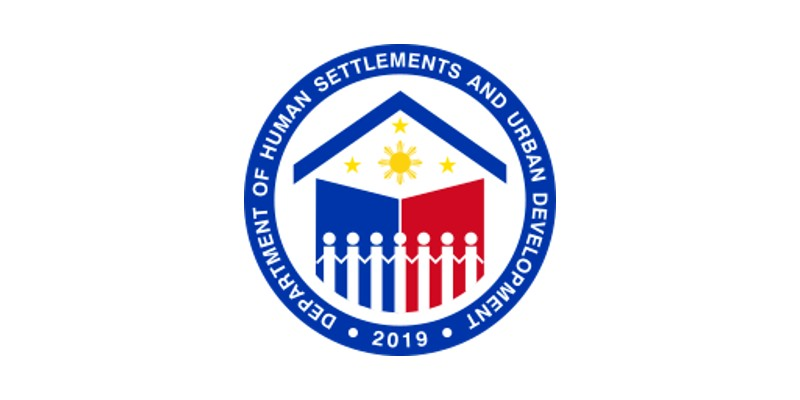
- Flag of the department

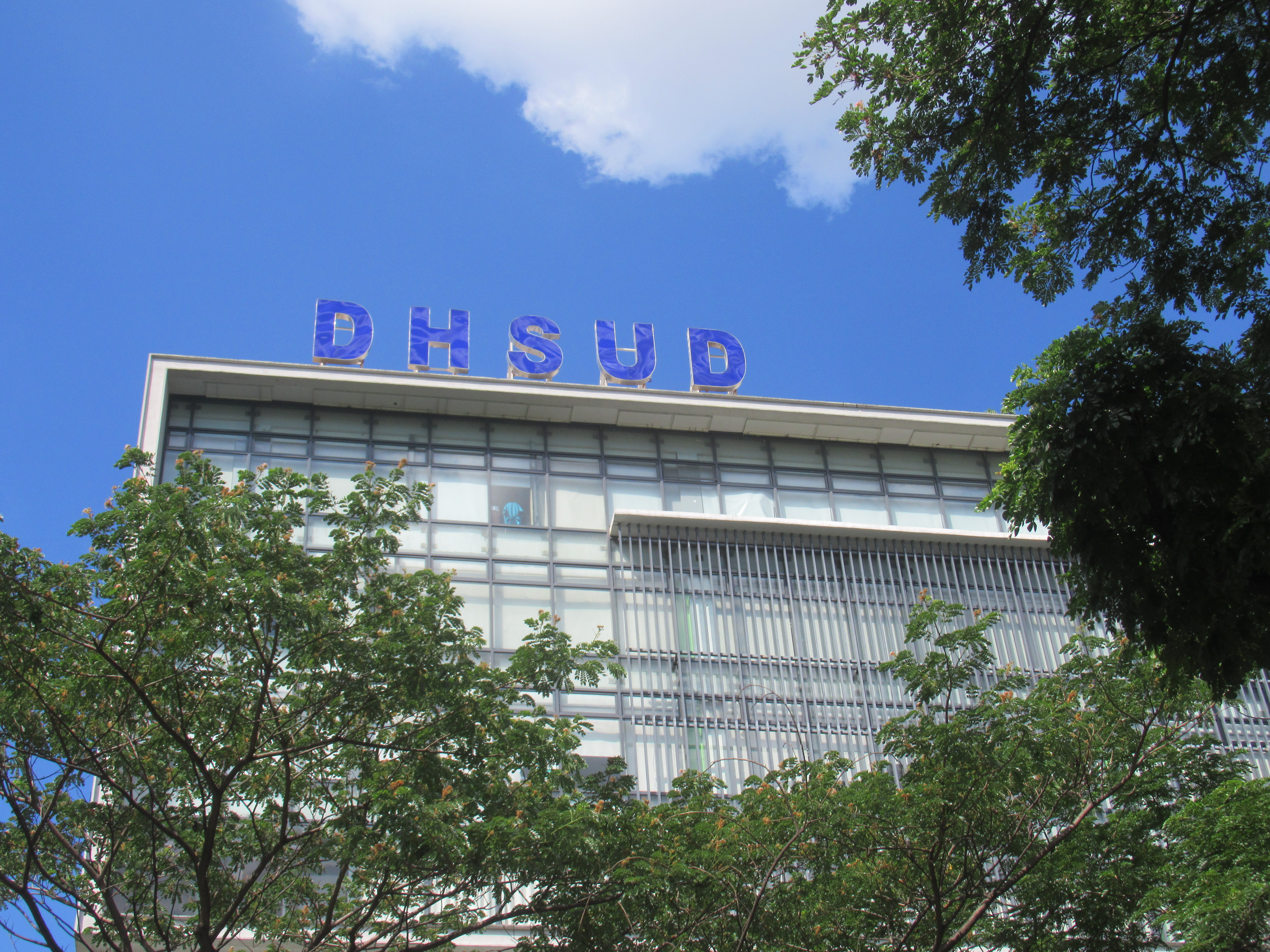
- Department of Human Settlements and Urban Development building

Department overview
- Formed: February 14, 2019; 7 years ago
- Preceding agencies: Housing and Urban Development Coordinating Council; Housing and Land Use Regulatory Board
- Headquarters: Kalayaan Avenue corner Mayaman Street, Diliman, Quezon City
- Employees: 773 (2024)
- Annual budget: ₱656.48 million (2021)
- Department executive: Jose Ramon Aliling, Secretary
- Website: dhsud.gov.ph

The Department of Human Settlements and Urban Development (DHSUD; Filipino: Kagawaran ng Pananahanang Pantao at Pagpapaunlad ng Kalunsuran) is the executive department of the Philippine government responsible for the management of housing and related development in the Philippines. The department is led by the secretary of human settlements and urban development, as appointed by the president of the Philippines and confirmed by the Commission on Appointments. The secretary would be assisted by three Undersecretaries and three Assistant Secretaries, that would be appointed by the president upon the recommendation of the secretary.

== History ==
Republic Act No. 11201 signed by President Rodrigo Duterte on February 14, 2019

The law creating the Department of Human Settlements and Urban Development (DHSUD), Republic Act No. 11201, was signed into law by President Rodrigo Duterte on February 14, 2019, with the signing announced to the public by the government on February 19, 2019.

The DHSUD was the result of a merger of the Housing and Urban Development Coordinating Council (HUDCC) and the Housing and Land Use Regulatory Board (HLURB), with the former becoming defunct and the latter reorganized as the Human Settlements Adjudication Commission (HSAC).

The law was a consolidation of House Bill 6775 and Senate Bill 1578 which were passed by the House of Representatives and the Senate on October 10 and November 12, 2018, respectively. The Implement Rules and Regulations (IRR) for RA 11201 was signed on July 19, 2019. A five-month transition period will begin with a projected full implementation of the law by January 1, 2020.

On November 8th, 2024, it revised its IRR and became effective on December 18th that same year.

== Bureaus ==
The department is composed of the following bureaus:

- Environmental, Land Use and Urban Planning and Development Bureau (ELUPDB)
- Homeowners Associations and Community Development Bureau (HOACDB)
- Housing and Real Estate Development Regulation Bureau (HREDRB)

== Attached agencies ==
The following government agencies and corporations are attached to the department for policy and program coordination:

- Home Development Mutual Fund (HDMF, but popularly known as Pag-IBIG Fund)
- Human Settlement Adjudication Commission (HSAC)
- National Housing Authority (Philippines) (NHA)
- National Home Mortgage Finance Corporation (NHMFC)
- Social Housing Finance Corporation (SHFC)

== See also ==
- U.S. Department of Housing and Urban Development
- Ministry of Human Settlements and Development (Bangsamoro)
