= 2025 Philippine cabinet reshuffle =

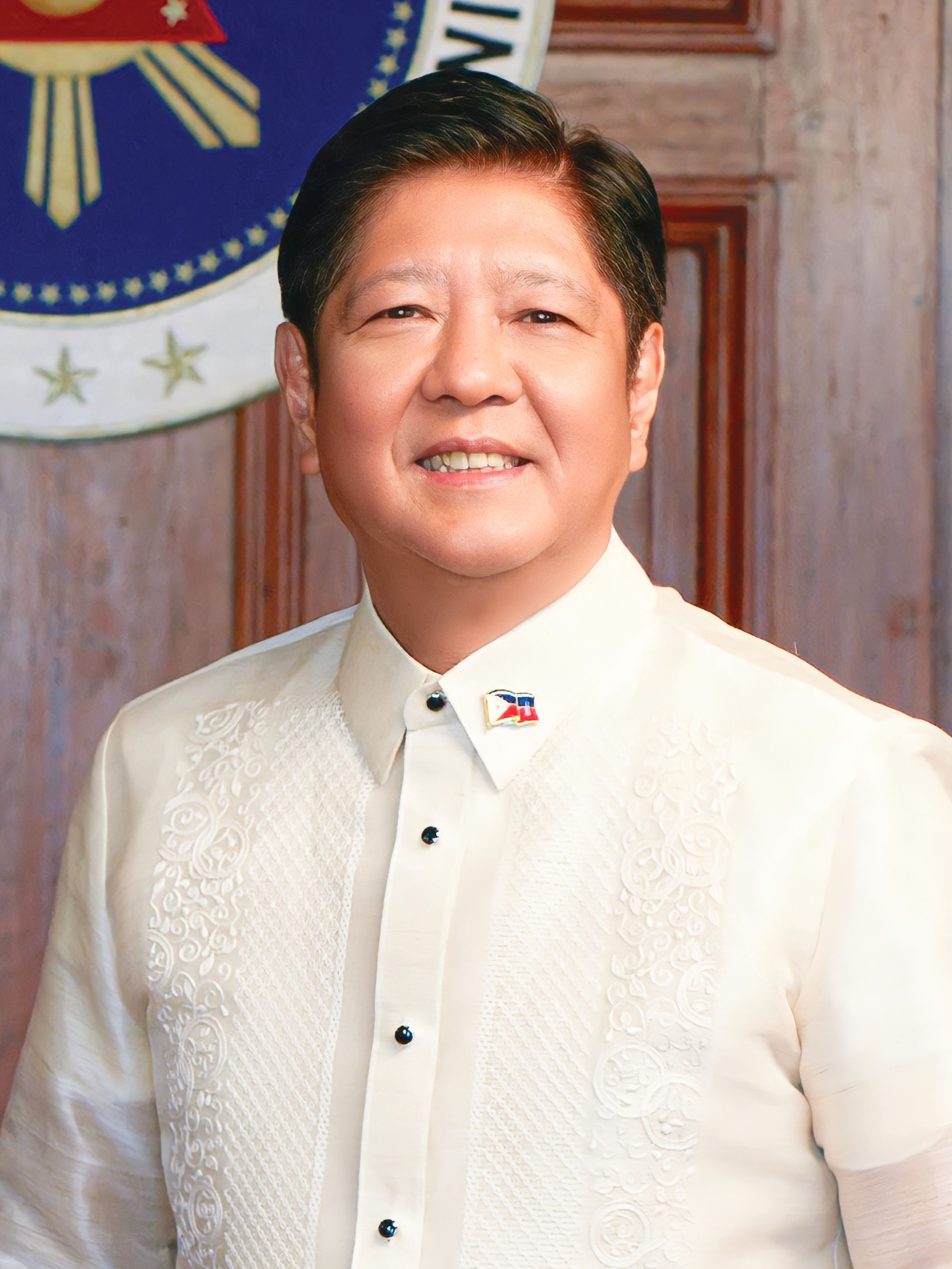
Bongbong Marcos

Following unfavorable results in the 2025 Philippine midterm elections, President Bongbong Marcos issued a directive on May 22, 2025, asking for the courtesy resignations of his cabinet secretaries, heads of agencies, presidential advisers, undersecretaries, assistant secretaries, regional directors, provincial directors, etc.

This was the first cabinet reshuffle in the Philippines since the Hello Garci scandal under then president Gloria Macapagal Arroyo.

== Background ==
The Marcos-backed Alyansa para sa Bagong Pilipinas underperformed expectations in the Philippine Senate election, only winning six of the twelve seats up for election, the lowest for an administration-backed ticket since 2007. Political groups opposed to the administration—DuterTen and KiBam—gained seats in upset victories. In the House of Representatives, the Lakas–CMD remained the largest party with 104 of its congressional candidates winning in local races, albeit with fewer seats at the end of the outgoing 19th Congress. President Bongbong Marcos deemed the results a rejection of his governance.

== Courtesy resignation directive ==
In response to the elections, President Marcos issued a directive on May 22, 2025, asking all members for their courtesy resignations to allow for the assessment of each department and to adjust his administration in line with its "recalibrated priorities". As of June 28, 2025, all cabinet secretaries, heads of agencies, and presidential advisers and assistants tendered their courtesy resignations.

On May 28, 2025, the Governance Commission for GOCCs (GCG) extended the courtesy resignation directive to all non-ex officio chairpersons, chief executive officers (CEOs) and appointive members of government-owned and controlled corporations.

== Changes in the Cabinet ==
=== First phase ===
On May 23, 2025, Executive Secretary Lucas Bersamin announced the initial lineup in the cabinet reshuffle. The resignations of the Secretaries of Foreign Affairs, Environment and Natural Resources and the Human Settlements and Urban Development were accepted and replaced. The resignations filed by the Executive Secretary, the Secretaries of Finance, Budget and Management, Trade and Industry, Economy, Planning and Development and the Special Assistant to the President for Investment and Economic Affairs were rejected and retained in the current positions.

=== Second phase ===
On May 29, 2025, Executive Secretary Bersamin announced the second wave of the Cabinet reshuffle, with the resignations of the Solicitor General and the Chairperson of the Commission on Higher Education accepted. Meanwhile, the resignations tendered by the Secretaries of National Defense, Justice, and the Interior and Local Government were declined, and they will remain in their current posts.

=== Third phase ===
On June 3, 2025, Executive Secretary Bersamin announced the third phase of the cabinet reshuffle. The resignations of the Chairman of the Presidential Commission for the Urban Poor and the Presidential Assistant for the Visayas and the Presidential Adviser on Muslim Affairs were accepted. While the Presidential Adviser for Special Concerns was dismissed. Meanwhile, the resignations submitted by the remaining Cabinet Secretaries and heads of key agencies—including those in Customs, Internal Revenue, the Treasury, and the Metropolitan Manila Development Authority—were not accepted, and they will remain in their posts.

The ongoing “performance review” of the remaining Cabinet-rank Secretaries including the National Security Adviser, and the Secretary of the Presidential Communications Office, continued with all concerned officials remaining in their current positions for the time being. Later on, the National Security Adviser was retained on June 10, 2025.

On June 17, President Marcos reappointed Jay Ruiz as Secretary of the Presidential Communications Office and Henry Aguda as Secretary of Information and Communications Technology, thereby nullifying their earlier courtesy resignations, which followed their being bypassed by the Commission on Appointments.

=== Fourth phase ===
Then, on June 19, as part of the fourth phase of the ongoing reshuffle, President Marcos accepted the courtesy resignations of the Secretary of the Presidential Legislative Liaison Office, the Presidential Adviser for Police and Military Affairs, and the President and Chief Executive Officer of the Philippine National Oil Company Renewables Corporation. However, he retained the heads of key agencies, particularly those overseeing government-controlled financial institutions such as the Development Bank of the Philippines, the Land Bank of the Philippines, and the Government Service Insurance System, as well as prominent government-owned and controlled corporations, including the Philippine Health Insurance Corporation and the Philippine Charity Sweepstakes Office.

On June 28, Executive Secretary Bersamin announced the courtesy resignation of the Chairperson of the Philippine Sports Commission was accepted announced the new appointment of Patrick Gregorio as its head.

On June 30, President Marcos subsequently replaced the Commissioner of the Bureau of Customs, although no reason was provided at the time.

=== Fifth phase ===
On July 10, 2025, President Marcos carried out another round of Cabinet reshuffles, replacing Jay Ruiz as Secretary of the Presidential Communications Office with Dave Gomez, a former marketing executive and communications director at PMFTC Inc., the Philippine affiliate of Philip Morris International. Ruiz was subsequently appointed to the Board of Directors of the Manila Economic and Cultural Office (MECO), the Philippines’ de facto embassy in Taiwan. In the same shake-up, Marcos also appointed Sharon Garin appointed as a full-term Secretary of Energy, who previously served as Officer-in-Charge of the department.

=== Changes in the executive departments ===
Color key
- Joined the Cabinet
- Office created or split
- Left the Cabinet

Cabinet Secretary		Position before reshuffle	Position after reshuffle	Ref.
Image	Name	Position before reshuffle	Position after reshuffle	Ref.
	Jose Acuzar	Secretary of Human Settlements and Urban Development	Presidential Adviser for Pasig River Development	
	Raphael Lotilla	Secretary of Energy	Secretary of Environment and Natural Resources (Note: Left the cabinet as Secretary of Environment and Natural Resources upon Lotilla's appointment as the Ambassador of the Philippines to the Holy See.)	
	Jose Ramon Aliling	Undersecretary of Human Settlements and Urban Development	Secretary of Human Settlements and Urban Development	
	Rolando Toledo	Undersecretary for Budget Preparation and Execution Group of the Department of Budget and Management	Acting Secretary of Budget and Management	
	Tess Lazaro	Undersecretary of Foreign Affairs	Secretary of Foreign Affairs	
	Sharon Garin	Undersecretary of Energy	Secretary of Energy (Note: Served as Officer in Charge of the DOE from May 23, 2025 to July 10, 2025.)	
	Dave Gomez	None	Secretary of the Presidential Communications Office	
	Darlene Berberabe	None (Dean of the University of the Philippines College of Law)	Solicitor General of the Philippines	
	Giovanni Z. Lopez	Undersecretary for Administration, Finance, and Procurement of the Department of Transportation	Acting Secretary of Transportation	
	Fredderick A. Vida	Undersecretary of Justice	Acting Secretary of Justice	
	Enrique Manalo	Secretary of Foreign Affairs	Permanent Representative of the Philippines to the United Nations (Note: The Permanent Representative of the Philippines to the United Nations is not a cabinet-level position.) assumed office on September 9, 2025.	
	Jay Ruiz	Secretary of the Presidential Communications Office	Member of the Board of Directors of the Manila Economic and Cultural Office (Note: Membership to the Board of Directors of the Manila Economic and Cultural Office is not a cabinet-level position.)	
	Toni Yulo-Loyzaga	Secretary of Environment and Natural Resources	Dismissed from the government	
	Menardo Guevarra	Solicitor General of the Philippines	Dismissed from the government	
	Mark Llandro Mendoza	Presidential Adviser on Legislative Affairs and Head of the Presidential Legislative Liaison Office	Dismissed from the government	
	Roman A. Felix	Presidential Adviser on Police and Military Affairs	Dismissed from the government	
	Almarim Tillah	Presidential Adviser on Muslim Affairs	Dismissed from the government	
	Terence Calatrava	Presidential Assistant for Visayas	Dismissed from the government	
	Meynard Sabili	Chairman of the Presidential Commission for the Urban Poor	Dismissed from the government	
	Menandro Espinelli	Presidential Adviser for Special Concerns	Dismissed from the government	

=== Changes in the agencies, authorities and offices under the Office of the President and executive departments ===
Color key
- Appointment as Head of Agency
- Agency created or split
- Left the Government

Head of Agencies		Position before reshuffle	Position after reshuffle	Ref.
Image	Name	Position before reshuffle	Position after reshuffle	Ref.
	Shirley Agrupis	Commissioner of the Commission on Higher Education	Chairperson of the Commission on Higher Education	
	Ariel Nepomuceno	Executive Director of the National Disaster Risk Reduction and Management Council and Administrator of the Office of Civil Defense	Commissioner of the Bureau of Customs	
	Bernardo Rafaelito Alejandro IV	Assistant Secretary of the Office of Civil Defense	Officer in Charge of the Office of Civil Defense	
	Patrick Gregorio	None (Note: Previously served chairman of the Philippine Rowing Association.)	Chairperson of the Philippine Sports Commission	
	J. Prospero de Vera III	Chairperson of the Commission on Higher Education	Dismissed from the government	
	John J. Arenas	President and CEO of the PNOC Renewables Corporation	Dismissed from the government	
	Dickie Bachmann	Chairperson of the Philippine Sports Commission	Dismissed from the government	
	Bienvenido Y. Rubio	Commissioner of the Bureau of Customs	Dismissed from the government	

== Reactions ==
=== Philippine government officials ===
House Committee on Dangerous Drugs Chairman and Surigao del Norte Representative Ace Barbers remarked that the President's directive paves the way for the removal of underperforming senior officials—particularly those who fail to defend him when he or his administration comes under fire from critics or the opposition.

In response to President Marcos Jr.’s call for Cabinet courtesy resignations following the midterm elections, ML party-list Representative-elect Leila de Lima welcomed the move as a potential reset—if carried out with resolve. It reflects an awareness that the public expects more—more coherence, more competence, and more decisive leadership,” she noted. De Lima warned, however, that without genuine intent and firm governance, the perception of Marcos as a lame-duck president would only deepen.

=== Business community ===
The Makati Business Club (MBC) expressed satisfaction with Marcos' economic team and does not expect a major change in that part of his cabinet. Marcos retained the economic team, a move welcomed by the MBC and the Philippine Chamber of Commerce and Industry (PCCI).

=== Cardema's call for the COMELEC Chairperson to resign ===
Ronald Cardema of Duterte Youth had asked Commission on Elections (COMELEC) chairperson George Garcia to resign after posting on social media that Marilyn Barua-Yap, the chairperson of the Civil Service Commission (CSC), also submitted her courtesy resignation. Barua-Yap denied resigning, explaining that the president's order for cabinet members to resign did not apply to her, or to any of the independent constitutional offices (i.e. COMELEC and CSC, among others) as it was not part of the executive branch of government.
