= Lex Anthony Colada =

Filipino lawyer and politician (born 1969)

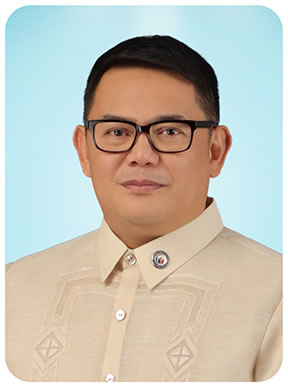
- Official portrait, 2022

Representative for the AAMBIS-Owa Party List to the House of Representatives of the Philippines
- In office June 30, 2022 – June 30, 2025
- Preceded by: Sharon Garin

Personal details
- Born: Lex Anthony Cris Adelantar Colada; September 1, 1969 (age 56) Iloilo, Philippines
- Party: AAMBIS-Owa, ANGKASANGGA
- Spouse: Janette "Jennifer" Garin
- Education: University of the Philippines Visayas
- Occupation: Politician
- Profession: Lawyer

Lex Anthony Cris Adelantar Colada (born September 1, 1969) is a Filipino lawyer and a representative for the AAMBIS-Owa Party List to the 19th Congress of the Philippines. He also ran as the third nominee of the party-list ANGKASANGGA in the 2025 House of Representatives elections.

== Early life and education ==
Lex Anthony Colada was born on September 1, 1969 to Teodulo A. Colada, a lawyer who served as councilor of Janiuay, Iloilo in the 1970s and later as regional trial court judge.

He studied at the University of the Philippines Visayas, where he graduated with a Bachelor of Arts in Sociology and Community Development in 1992. He was the former president of Iloilo 1 Electric Cooperative, Inc.

== House of Representatives ==
On the 2022 Philippine general election, AAMBIS-Owa Party List, or Ang Asosasyon Sang Mangunguma Nga Bisaya-Owa Mangunguma, ran in the partylist elections. The party list gained 245,650 votes or 0.68 percent of the votes, qualifying for one seat. Since Colada was the first nominee, he filled the seat. On March 7, 2023, he led a panel from the House Committee on Ways and Means which will craft a bill penalizing the bulk smuggling of foreign currencies. On May 22, 2024. he opposed Shopee, calling for a deeper probe into the company for worker rights. On November 12, 2024, a gun used in a murder of a barangay chairman in Iloilo was traced to Colada. Two days later, a charge was filed against him. On December 19, 2024, Colada endorsed the third impeachment complaint against Sara Duterte. On January 23, 2025, he supported a government takeover of the National Grid Corporation of the Philippines.

On October 4, 2024, Department of Energy Undersecretary Sharon Garin, his predecessor as AAMBIS-Owa Party List representative, nominated the party Ang Kasangga ng Mangunguma-Owa Mangunguma (ANGKASANGGA) to the 2025 Philippine House of Representatives elections; Colada was selected as the third nominee of the party-list.

== Personal life ==
Colada is married to Janette "Jennifer" Garin-Colada, the mayor of Guimbal, Iloilo. She is a member of the Garin family, a political clan in Iloilo.
