= Climate change in the Philippines =

Impact of climate change on the Philippines

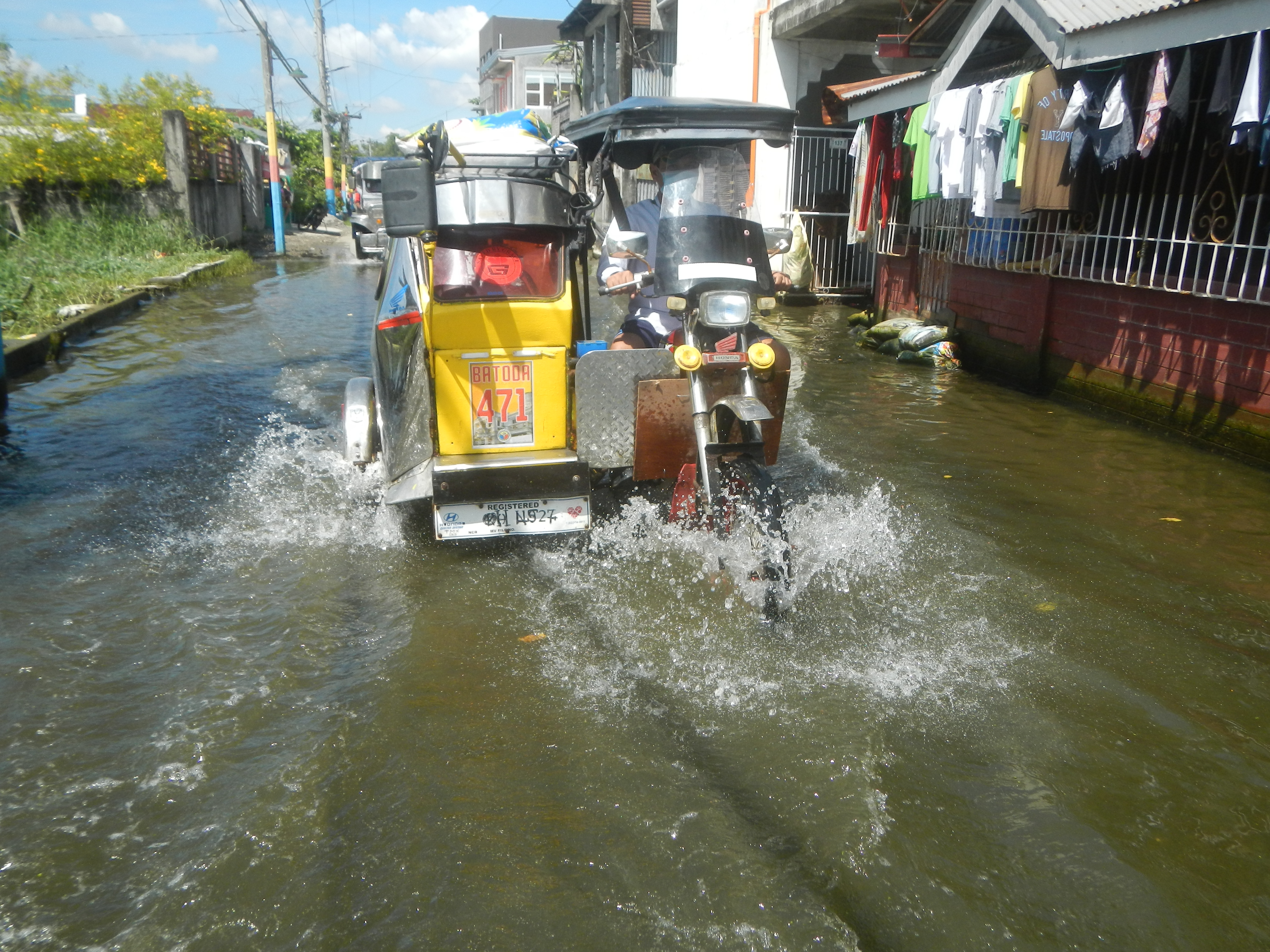
Both floods and droughts are predicted to increase.

Climate change is having serious impacts in the Philippines such as increased frequency and severity of natural disasters, sea level rise, extreme rainfall, resource shortages, and environmental degradation. All of these impacts together have greatly affected the Philippines' agriculture, water, infrastructure, human health, and coastal ecosystems and they are projected to continue having devastating damages to the economy and society of the Philippines.

According to the UN Office for the Coordination of Humanitarian Affairs (OCHA), the Philippines is one of the most disaster-prone countries in the world. The archipelago is situated along the Pacific Ocean's typhoon belt, leaving the country vulnerable to around 20 typhoons each year, a quarter of which are destructive. The December 2021 typhoon known colloquially as Typhoon Odette caused almost one billion US$ (₱47.6 billion) in infrastructure, housing, and agricultural damages and displaced 114,943 people. The United Nations Development Programme (UNDP) reported in 2022 that Typhoon Odette affected the lives of 9.9 million people. More tragically, the physical and economic repercussions of Typhoon Odette led to the death of 407 people as of December 2022.

In addition to the Philippines' close proximity to the Pacific Ocean's typhoon belt, the Philippines is also located within the "Pacific Ring of Fire" which makes the country prone to recurrent earthquakes and volcanic eruptions. Compounding these issues, the impacts of climate change, such as accelerated sea level rise, exacerbate the state's high susceptibility to natural disasters, like flooding and landslides. Aside from geography, climate change impacts regions with a history of colonization more intensely than regions without a history of colonization. Colonized regions experience the repercussions of climate change most jarringly "because of their high dependence on natural resources, their geographical and climatic conditions and their limited capacity to effectively adapt to a changing climate." Since low-income countries have a history of colonialism and resource exploitation, their environment lacks the diversity necessary to prevail against natural disasters. A lack of biodiversity reduces the resilience of a specific region, leaving them more susceptible to natural disasters and the effects of climate change. With its history of Spanish colonization, the Philippines is not environmentally nor economically equipped to overcome issues it is currently dealing with, such as natural disasters and climate change. This inability to recover exacerbates the problem, creating a cycle of environmental and economic devastation in the country.

The Philippines, an archipelago of over 7,000 islands, is exceptionally vulnerable to the impacts of climate change. Rising sea levels threaten coastal communities, leading to increased flooding and displacement. Extreme weather events, such as typhoons, are becoming more frequent and intense, causing widespread destruction and economic losses. Changes in rainfall patterns disrupt agricultural cycles, impacting food security and livelihoods. The country's rich biodiversity is also at risk, as changing temperatures and ocean acidification affect ecosystems and marine life. Addressing climate change in the Philippines requires a multifaceted approach, including mitigation efforts to reduce greenhouse gas emissions, adaptation strategies to build resilience, and international cooperation to support vulnerable nations.

== Greenhouse gas emissions ==
Philippines share of global greenhouse gas (GHG) emissions is 0.48%. Nevertheless, the country is highly vulnerable to the effects of climate change. GHG emissions in the Philippines are rising. Over 41% of the country's GHG emissions come from the burning of coal and fuel oil for electricity generation, with many coal plants being technically unable to ramp down. Land, water, and air transport accounts for 35% of GHG emissions.

Carbon dioxide emissions from energy, 2011-2021 (MtCO₂)
2011	2012	2013	2014	2015	2016	2017	2018	2019	2020	2021
80.7	83.1	91.9	97.3	106.2	116.4	128.9	133.7	140.7	127.2	136.8

The Philippines, a signatory of the Paris climate accord, aims to cut its emissions by 75% by 2030. In 2021 youth climate activists protested Standard Chartered's financing of coal companies. Legislation to create an emissions trading system is being considered.

== Impacts on the natural environment ==
=== Climate history ===
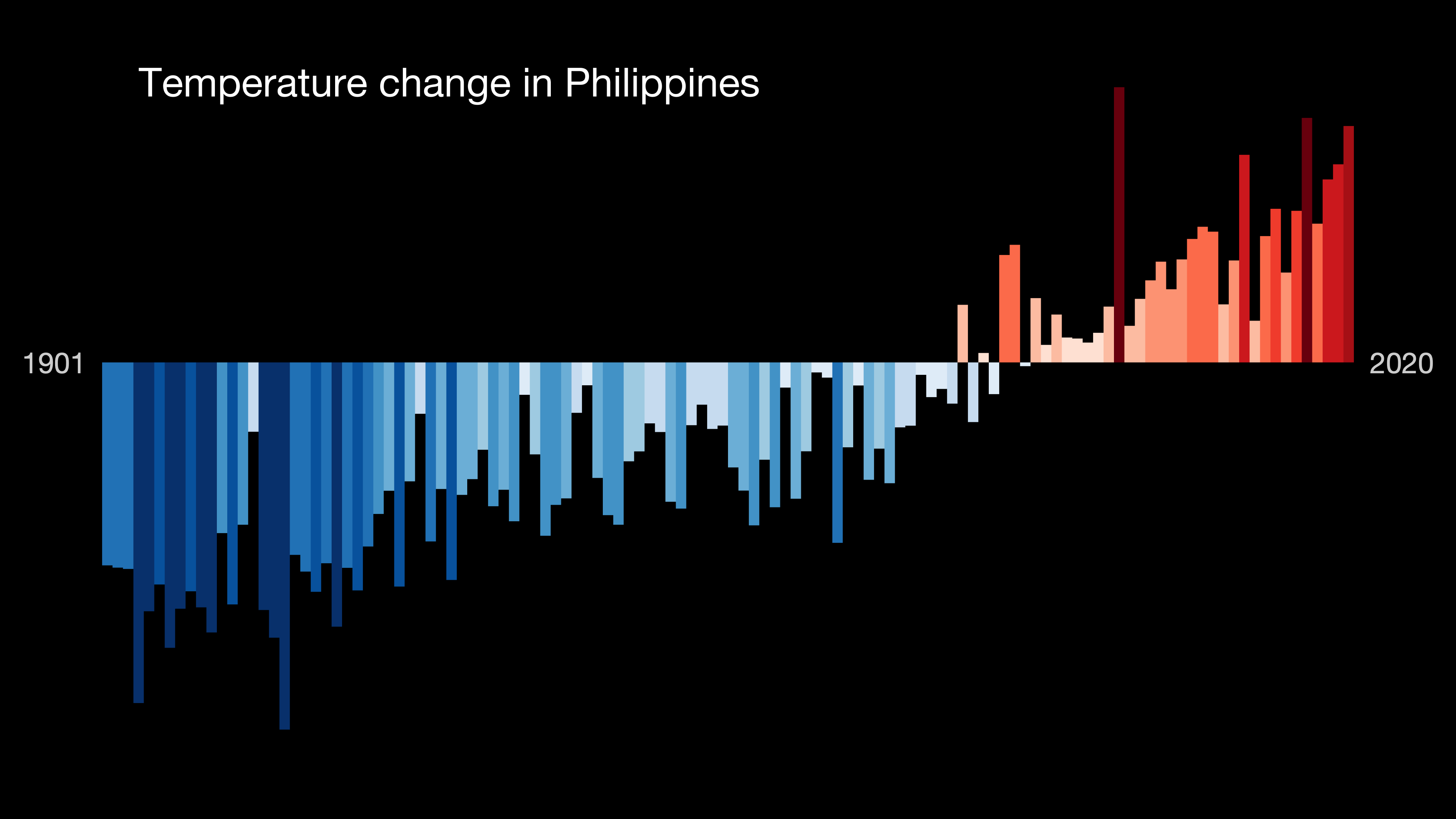
Visualisation of temperature change in the Philippines between 1901 and 2020

Köppen climate classification map for the Philippines for 1980–2016

2071–2100 map under the most intense climate change scenario. Mid-range scenarios are currently considered more likely

Due to its geographical location, climate, and topography, the Philippines is ranked third on the World Risk Index for highest disaster risk and exposure to natural disasters. 16 of its provinces, including Manila, Benguet, and Batanes, are included in the top 50 most vulnerable places in Southeast Asia, with Manila being ranked 7th. Four cities in the Philippines—Manila, San Jose, Roxas, and Cotabato—are included in the top 10 cities most vulnerable to sea level rise in the East Asia and Pacific region. The country is consistently at risk from severe natural hazards including typhoons, floods, landslides, and drought. It is located within a region that experiences the highest rate of typhoons in the world, averaging 20 typhoons annually, with about 7–9 that actually make landfall. In 2009, the Philippines had the third highest number of casualties from natural disasters with the second most number of victims.

Climate change has had and will continue to have drastic effects on the climate of the Philippines. From 1951 to 2010, the Philippines saw its average temperature rise by 0.65 °C, with fewer recorded cold nights and more hot days. Since the 1970s, the number of typhoons during the El Niño season has increased. The Philippines has not only seen 0.15 meters of sea level rise since 1940, but also seen 0.6 to 1 °C increase in sea surface temperatures since 1910, and 0.09 °C increase in ocean temperatures since 1950. During the time period from 1990 to 2006, the Philippines experienced a number of record-breaking weather events, including the strongest typhoon (wind speeds), the most destructive typhoons (damages), the deadliest storm (casualties), and the typhoon with the highest 24-hour rainfall on record. A recent study utilizing the Imperial College Storm Model (IRIS) has identified that the most deadliest typhoon that has hit the Philippines had a greater enhanced wind speed of +3.5 m/s compared to the pre-industrial base case

=== Super typhoon Haiyan ===
At 04:40 on November 8, 2013, Super Typhoon Haiyan, also known locally as "Yolanda", made landfall in the Philippines in the Guiuan municipality. The category 5 typhoon continued to travel west, making landfall in several municipalities, and ultimately devastated enormous stretches of the Philippines islands of Samar, Leyte, Cebu, and the Visayan archipelago. Tied for being the strongest landfalling tropical typhoon on record, Typhoon Haiyan had wind speeds of over 300 km/h (almost 190 mph) which triggered major storm surges that wreaked havoc on many places in the country. Leaving over 6,300 dead, 28,688 injured, and 1062 missing, Typhoon Haiyan is the deadliest typhoon on record in the Philippines. More than 16 million people were affected by the storm, suffering from the storm surge, flash floods, landslides, and extreme winds and rainfall that took lives, destroyed homes, and devastated many. Typhoon Haiyan crucially damaged over 1.1 million houses across the country and displaced over 4.1 million people. According to the NDRRMC, the storm cost the Philippines about 3.64 billion US dollars. The typhoon caused significant damage to some agricultural areas farmed by the Suludnon indigenous people in the Jayubo village of Lambunao, Iloilo.

=== Coastal ecosystems and fisheries ===
Climate change and global warming and the rising amounts of CO_{2} in the atmosphere have contributed to ocean warming and ocean acidification. The ocean has acted as a carbon sink for earth for millennia and is currently slowing the rate of global warming through the sequestration of carbon. This comes at a cost however as the oceans are becoming more and more acidic as they sequester more carbon dioxide. Ocean acidification has dire consequences as it causes coral bleaching and ultimately leads to the collapse of coral reefs (usaid). Rising sea levels cause increased salinity that can have damaging impacts on the country's extensive system of mangroves. Both coral reefs and mangroves help reduce coastal erosion and support water quality. Erosion from the loss of coral reefs and mangroves increase the chance of coastal flooding and loss of land. Coral reefs and mangroves also act as important feeding and spawning areas for many fish species that many fisherfolk depend on for survival. Over 60% of the coastal population depends on marine resources such as coral reefs or mangroves for their contributions to fisheries, tourism, and storm protection.

As of 2015, there is an estimated 1.9 million fisherfolk in the Philippines. Fisherfolk are among the country's poorest sectors in society.

=== Sea level rise ===
Globally, an estimated 150 million people live in communities that will be submerged in water by 2050. The Philippines is among the countries most affected by rising sea levels. Children are the most vulnerable. As of 2023, records from three decades show sea levels rising by 7 to 10 centimeters per decade along Philippine coasts, which is three times faster than the world average.

Philippine coastlines, one of the longest in the world, stretch more than 36,000 kilometers. Coastal areas and their communities are threatened by rising sea levels and gradual submersion. These endanger the livelihood of fishing communities as well as the country's food security.

Among the areas that will be severely affected are Manila Bay and Isla Pamarawan, Malolos, Bulacan. Metro Manila faces compounding risks from anthropogenic land subsidence driven by groundwater extraction, which reaches up to 109 mm/year in the northern CAMANAVA zone. Combined with gravitational sea-level fingerprints, this projects a relative sea-level rise of 1.51–2.00 m by 2100 under high-emission scenarios, significantly exceeding global mean projections.

=== Future projections ===
Future projections for the current trajectory of climate change predict that global warming is likely to exceed 3 °C, potentially 4 °C, by 2060. Specifically in the Philippines, average temperatures are "virtually certain" to see an increase of 1.8 to 2.2 °C. This temperature increase will stratify the local climate and cause the wet and dry seasons to be wetter and drier, respectively. Most areas in the Philippines will see reduced rainfall from March to May, while Luzon and Visayas will see increased heavy rainfall. There will also be an increase in: the number of days that exceed 35 °C; that have less than 2.5 mm of rainfall; and that have more than 300mm of rainfall. Additionally, climate change will continue to increase the intensity of typhoons and tropical storms. Sea levels around the Philippines are projected to rise 0.48 to 0.65 meters by 2100, which exceeds the global average for rates of sea level rise. Combined with sea level rise, this stratification into more extreme seasons and climates increases the frequency and severity of storm surge, floods, landslides, and droughts. These exacerbate risks to agriculture, energy, water, infrastructure, human health, and coastal ecosystems.

== Impacts on people ==
=== Economic and social impacts ===
==== Agriculture ====
Agriculture is one of the Philippines' largest sectors and will continue to be adversely impacted by the effects of climate change. The agriculture sector employs 35% of the working population and generated 13% of the country's GDP in 2009. The two most important crops, rice and corn, account for 67% of the land under cultivation and stand to see reduced yields from heat and water stress. In addition to these challenges, the agricultural sector in the Philippines has also been significantly impacted by the drought conditions induced by El Niño. This phenomenon has led to considerable agricultural losses, estimated at about 4.4 billion pesos ($76.2 million). Nearly 78,000 hectares of agricultural land, predominantly used for rice cultivation, have been affected. Rice, wheat, and corn crops are expected to see a 10% decrease in yield for every 1 °C increase over a 30 °C average annual temperature.

Increases in extreme weather events will have devastating effects on agriculture. Typhoons (high winds) and heavy rainfall contribute to the destruction of crops, reduced soil fertility, altered agricultural productivity through severe flooding, increased runoff, and soil erosion. Droughts and reduced rainfall lead to increased pest infestations that damage crops as well as an increased need for irrigation. Rising sea levels increases salinity which leads to a loss of arable land and irrigation water.

All of these factors contribute to higher prices of food and an increased demand for imports, which hurt the general economy as well as individual livelihoods. From 2006 to 2013, the Philippines experienced a total of 75 disasters that cost the agricultural sector $3.8 billion in loss and damages. Typhoon Haiyan alone cost the Philippines' agricultural sector an estimated US$724 million after causing 1.1 million tonnes of crop loss and destroying 600,000 ha of farmland. The agricultural sector is expected to see an estimated annual GDP loss of 2.2% by 2100 due to climate impacts on agriculture. The Department of Agriculture says 500,000 to 600,000 metric tons in palay production is lost each year to heavy rain and flooding. In 2025, amid the need for funds for irrigation infrastructure, concerns were raised regarding corruption in the flood control projects scandal in the Philippines.

==== Agricultural production and civil conflict ====
In the Philippines, there is a correlation between rainfall and civil conflict, and manifests through agricultural production. The increased rainfall during the wet season in the Philippines is proven to be harmful to agriculture as it leads to flooding and water logging. This above average rainfall is associated with "more conflict related incidents and casualties". The rainfall has a negative effect on rice which is an important crop that a majority of the country depends on as a food source and for employment. A poor rice crop can lead to large impacts on the wellbeing of poor Filipinos and cause widespread contempt for the government and more support for insurgent groups. Climate change is expected to amplify the seasonal variation of rainfall in the Philippines and exacerbate ongoing civil conflict in the country.

==== Land grabbing ====
Land grabbing refers to the exploitation and acquisition of land for personal benefit. Like other developing countries, the Philippines have witnessed rapid change in the country's land tenure. For instance, studies have shown that development politics have driven efforts to convert land for rice cultivation into land that would be used for expanding industrialization and urbanization in Metropolitan Manila. Climate change impacts, especially rising sea levels and extreme weather events, have erased physical boundaries on agricultural land, making some areas in the Philippines even more vulnerable to land grabbing. As a hotspot of land grabbing, the Philippines sees the rise of large businesses and authorities like the Philippine Coconut Authority who have occupied vast amounts of land. With beliefs that only through the private sector will palm oil industries sustain growth, the Philippine Coconut Authority aggressively promotes expansion through large scale investors with the support of local government units in Bohol, Maguindanao, Cotabato and other locations. In the case of extreme weather events, such as Typhoon Haiyan, corporations that would like previously inhabited land will offer support to those impacted by the storm. Often these offers are intended to waive current land rights and re-home people to make room for more business development, such was the case for Ayala Corporation, who litigated inhabitants and removed them from the premises.

==== Gender disparities among farmers ====
Smallholder farmers in the Philippines are expected to be among the most vulnerable and impacted by the effects of climate change in the region. However, there are differences in how men and women experience these impacts and often lead to differences in farming patterns and coping strategies. Some of the problems caused by extreme climate events in agrarian areas that are prone to civil conflict that disproportionately affect women include loss of customary rights to land, forced migration, increased discrimination, resource poverty and food insecurity. The effect that the combination of severe climate events and civil conflict has on Filipino women is further exacerbated by discriminatory policies, belief and practices, and restricted access to resources.

Some of the problems that disproportionately affect men are linked to increase civil conflict in the Mindanao region which increases the number of casualties and deaths of young men in the area. Men are furthermore more likely to be involved in high-risk rescue operations during natural disasters. Men are also more likely to work in outdoor jobs such as construction, for which more frequent heat waves could lead to higher rates of heat-related illnesses.

Increased mortality among married men would simultaneously widow their wives and leaves them on their own to take care of their children, even when the society and government make it difficult for single mothers to succeed. Women are often relegated to be the caretakers of children, which increases the burden and stress placed on them as well as inhibiting them from escaping from conflict ridden areas.

=== Infrastructure ===
Rising sea levels, heavy rainfall and flooding, and strong typhoons pose an enormous risk to the Philippines' infrastructure. 45% of Philippines' urban population lives in informal settlements with already weak infrastructure and are extremely vulnerable to flooding and typhoons. A giant storm would wreak havoc on these informal settlements and cause the deaths and displacement of millions of people who inhabit 25 different coastline cities. These natural disasters will also cause millions of dollars in damages to urban infrastructure like bridges and roads. In 2009, Tropical Storm Ketsana cost the Philippines $33 million to repair damaged roads and bridges.

==== Energy ====
Climate change could simultaneously reduce the Philippines' supply of energy and increase its demand for energy. The increased chance of extreme weather events would reduce hydropower production, which accounts for 20% of the country's energy supply, as well as cause widespread damage to energy infrastructure and services. There will be more power outages on average in addition to an increased demand for power, specifically cooling.

As of 2019, coal accounted for about half of the Philippines' electricity supply. In 2020, the government said that it will follow a mixed energy strategy and announced a ban on new coal power plants.

==== Water ====
Several factors of climate change are impacting the availability of water in the Philippines. The increasing number of intense droughts are reducing water levels and river flows and thus creating a shortage in water. The floods and landslides caused by extreme rainfall degrade watershed health and water quality by increasing runoff and erosion that increases sedimentation in reservoirs. Many freshwater coastal aquifers have seen saltwater intrusion which reduces the amount of freshwater available for use. About 25% of coastal municipalities in Luzon, Visayas, and Mindanao are affected by this and the issue is expected to get worse with sea level rise. Due to changing rainfall patterns and temperature rises, some agricultural practices may become unsustainable.

==== Risk to "double exposure" ====
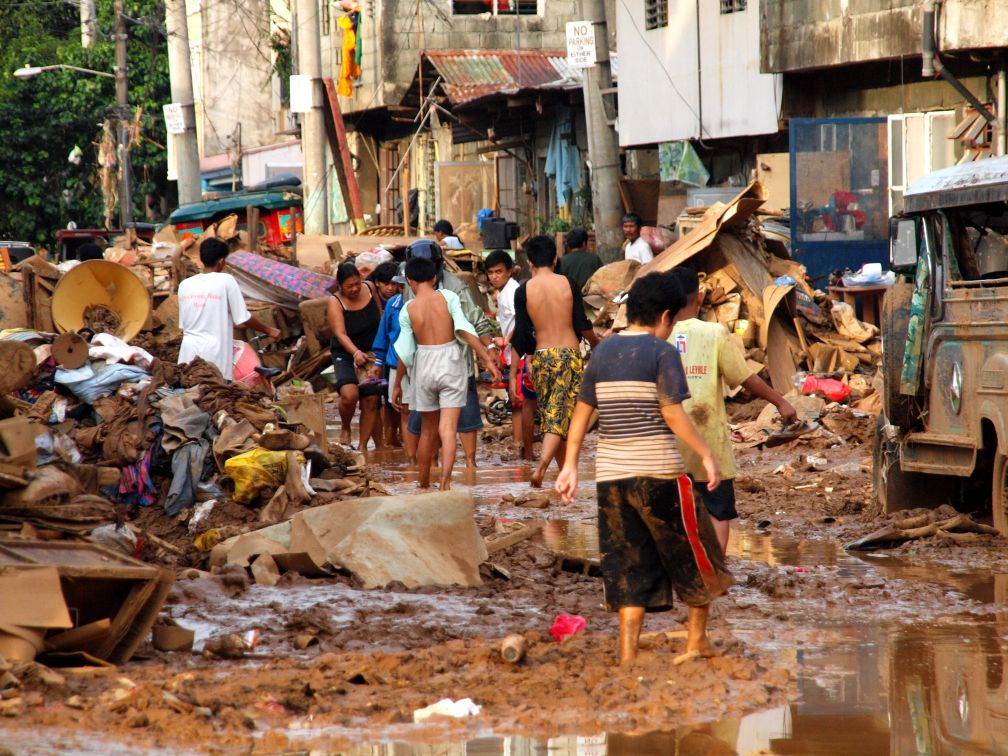
The Philippines is increasingly vulnerable to extreme weather and sea level rise, which both can cause urban flooding. The urban poor in major cities in the Philippines like Manila often will experience the effects worse than those with the economic mobility.

Large cities in the Philippines such as Manila, Quezon City, Cebu, and Davao City see an increased risk from both climate change and globalization. Double exposure, infrastructure planning, and urban climate resilience in coastal megacities. For example, in addition to being one of the world's most vulnerable cities to climate change due to geographical location, Manila has also been shaped by globalization and abides by many tenets of neoliberal urbanism, including "a strong focus on private sector led development, attracting global capital, market oriented policies and decentralization". These cities experience challenges to their own climate resilience due to this double exposure to climate change and globalization, where many cities are most at risk to climate events in addition to having a large percentage of the population live in informal settlements with weak infrastructure. Four million people, or about a third of Manila's population, live in informal settlements that put them at higher risk and danger from tropical storms and flooding, and they often have fewer resources available to recover from damage caused by environmental hazards.

=== Health impacts ===
Climate change, heavy rains, and increased temperatures are linked with the increased transmission of vector and waterborne diseases, such as malaria, dengue, and diarrhea (WHO). The heavy rains and increased temperatures lead to increased humidity which increases the chance of mosquito breeding and survival. Increased natural disasters not only directly contribute to the loss of human life, but also indirectly through food insecurity and the destruction of health services.

Increased disasters not only directly cause more human deaths, but also indirectly cause more deaths by destroying health services and causing food shortages. This disruptions may increase the spread of infectious disease, making recovery and health maintenance much more difficult for impacted communities.

== Mitigation and adaptation ==
Renewable energy in the Philippines is being expanded including with offshore wind power. A Pulse Asia survey conducted in 2018 revealed that 97% of energy consumers in Metro Manila favor the utilization of renewable energy. The government is making an adaptation plan.

Mangrove forests have proven to be an efficient and environmentally friendly solution to the effects of coastal hazards. Extensive mangrove rehabilitation projects have been undertaken in the Philippines.

Recognizing the Philippines' considerable disaster risk, there is need for disaster risk reduction and preparedness as well as humanitarian relief efforts. The Philippines institutionalizes the humanitarian cluster approach, and it organises disaster relief through its National Disaster Risk Reduction and Management Council (NDRRMC). NDRRMC also oversees the 18 regional Disaster Risk Reduction Management Councils (LDRRMCs), which in turn supervise disaster risk reduction and management operations at the provincial, city, and barangay levels (barangay is the lowest level of government, similar to the "village" level).

On March 11, 2024, the Department of Environment and Natural Resources' Toni Yulo-Loyzaga and the European Union launched the €60 million (P3.67 billion) "Green Economy Programme for the Philippines" in the form of a grant from 2023 to 2028 to mitigate environmental degradation and combat climate change to foster economic growth and social inclusivity. "The successful launch of the Green Economy Programme for the Philippines is part of the EU's new Global Gateway Strategy and shows our commitment worldwide to combating climate change while promoting inclusive economic development," EU Ambassador Luc Véron said.

== Society and culture ==
=== Education ===
Philippine Republic Act 9512 or "An Act to Promote Environmental Education and for other Purposes" mandates schools to teach climate change. In 2011, the Philippine Department of Education issued Memorandum Order No. 52 directing public and private schools to strengthen environmental education.

Science educators say that the Department of Education needs to provide training for teachers as well as address the shortage of classrooms, textbooks, and science equipment.

=== Activism ===
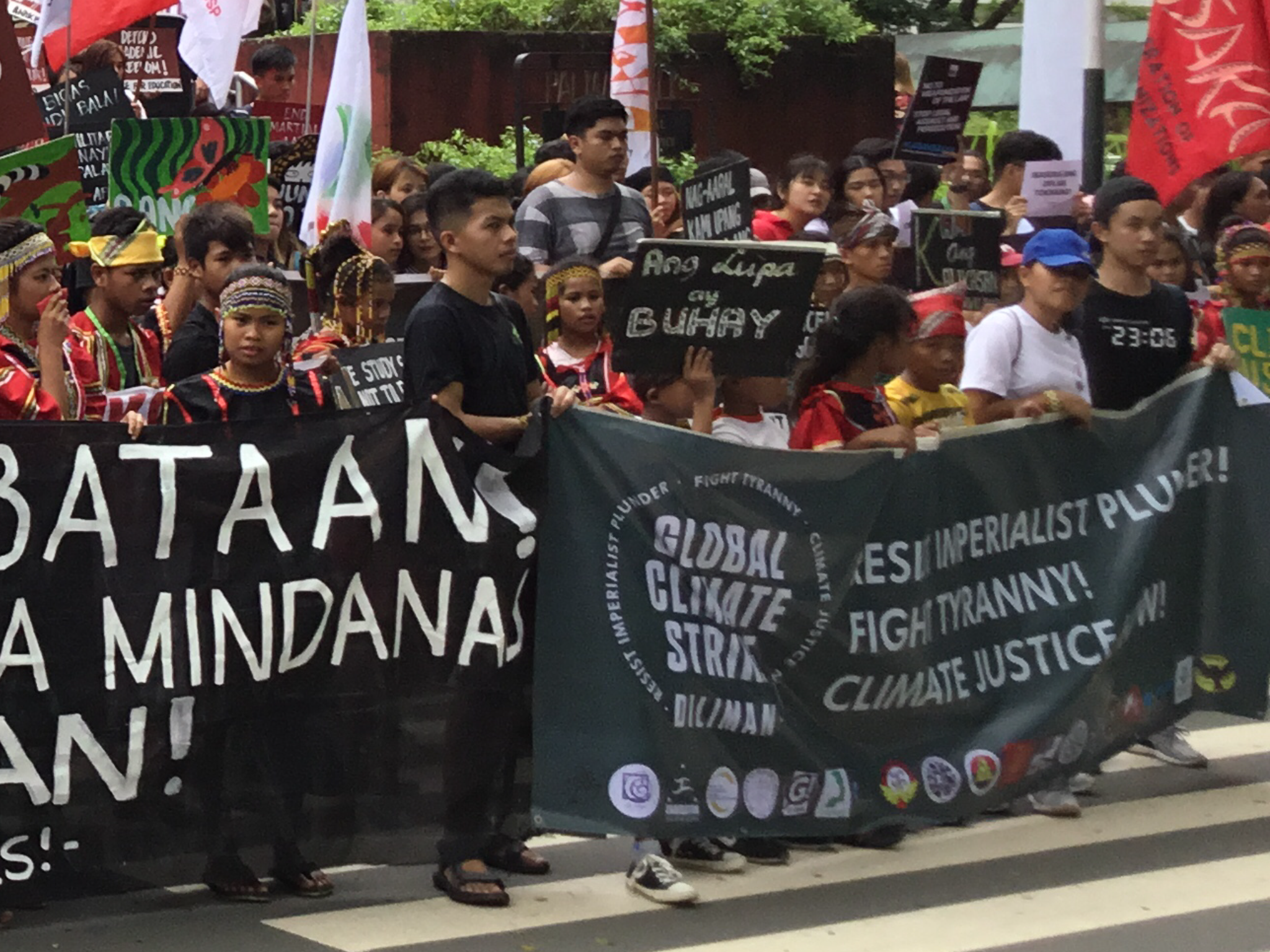
Protesters in Manila taking part in the September 2019 climate strikes

Activist groups associated with the climate movement have called for government action and have organized activities to raise public awareness on climate and related environmental, sociopolitical, and economic issues. Philippine activists have, for example, taken part in the global climate strike, joining demands for political leaders to urgently address the climate emergency.

Below are some protest actions and social movements associated with climate change in the Philippines.

- In 2021, activists stood outside the Standard Chartered office to protest the bank's funding of the coal industry. Standard Chartered is the biggest funder of the coal industry in the Philippines.
- As part of its policy advocacy, Greenpeace Philippines released an open letter in 2019 urging President Rodrigo Duterte to declare a climate change emergency to make climate change and its impacts a top government priority.
- The Catholic Bishops' Conference of the Philippines issued a pastoral letter in 2019 instructing dioceses to make caring for the environment a special concern in the face of the climate emergency.
- Fisherfolk organization Pambansang Lakas ng Kilusang Mamamalakaya ng Pilipinas (Pamalakaya) protested in Mendiola in 2020 to urge the Philippine government to address the impacts of climate change on fisherfolk. The group also called for an end to reclamation projects to preserve the marine ecosystem and protect millions of people from flooding and dislocation.
- Kalikasan People's Network for the Environment joined the 2015 International Human Rights Day protests to raise concern over the plight of climate refugees.
- Peasants, fisherfolk, Indigenous peoples, and other grassroots communities organized various protests in 2015 calling on government to end large-scale mining projects and address the root causes of the climate crisis.

=== Litigation ===
In May 2024, Nicol Melgar Marba, a Super Typhoon Odette survivor, and other victims of climate disasters from around the world filed before the Paris Criminal Court a criminal complaint against French oil company TotalEnergies, demanding compensation for "losses and damages for climate impacts".

In October 2025, 67 more people notified British oil company Shell of intended legal proceedings for its role in causing Super Typhoon Odette. The claim alleges that Shell’s actions materially contributed to anthropogenic climate change (ACC) which significantly intensified the typhoon’s impact and likelihood, thereby increasing the damage suffered by the survivors.

== See also ==
- Media related to Climate change in the Philippines at Wikimedia Commons
