= Zenaida Monsada =

Filipino chemist and cabinet member

Secretary of Energy
- In office July 2, 2015 – June 30, 2016; Acting from May 1–July 1, 2015
- President: Benigno Aquino III
- Preceded by: Jericho Petilla
- Succeeded by: Alfonso Cusi

Personal details
- Born: Zenaida Y. Monsada Ormoc, Leyte
- Education: University of San Carlos; University of the Philippines Diliman; Development Academy of the Philippines
- Profession: Chemist

Zenaida Y. Monsada is a Filipino chemist who served as first woman Secretary of Department of Energy from July 2015 until July 2016. Prior to being appointed as Energy Secretary she served as DOE Officer-in-charge from May–July 2015. While serving as OIC, she was also the undersecretary for four bureaus of the Department of Energy, Electric Power Industry Management Bureau, Energy Resources Development Bureau, Oil Industry Management Bureau, and the Renewable Energy Management Bureau.

== Early life and education ==
Monsada is the eldest of 12 children of public servants from Ormoc, Leyte. She is a graduate of Bachelor of Science in Chemistry from the University of San Carlos in Cebu City. She earned units in Master of Science in Chemistry from University of the Philippines Diliman and Master in Public Management from the Development Academy of the Philippines. She also had professional studies in Petroleum Management at the Arthur D. Little Management Education Institute in Boston, United States, and the Norwegian Petroleum Directorate in Stavanger, Norway.

== Career ==
Monsada started working as chemistry lab assistant at the University of San Carlos. She then worked as chemist for a special project of the Bureau of Mines under Department of Environment and Natural Resources. After that she worked as acting division chief of the Technical Assistance Division of the Bureau of Energy Utilization under the Department of Energy (DOE). She also worked as assistant branch chief of the Energy Regulatory Board and as director of the Energy Industry Administration Bureau of DOE. She led the setting up of national petroleum testing laboratory at the Energy department and the setup of mobile monitoring and testing facility.

After the resignation of then Energy Secretary Jericho Petilla, she was appointed as officer-in-charge of the department, until her formal appointment as the Secretary of Energy. While serving as OIC she was also the undersecretary for four bureaus of the Department of Energy, Electric Power Industry Management Bureau, Energy Resources Development Bureau, Oil Industry Management Bureau, and the Renewable Energy Management Bureau. She was formally appointed as Secretary on October 23, 2015 by then President Benigno Aquino III.
