= Raphael Lotilla =

Filipino lawyer and government official (born 1958)

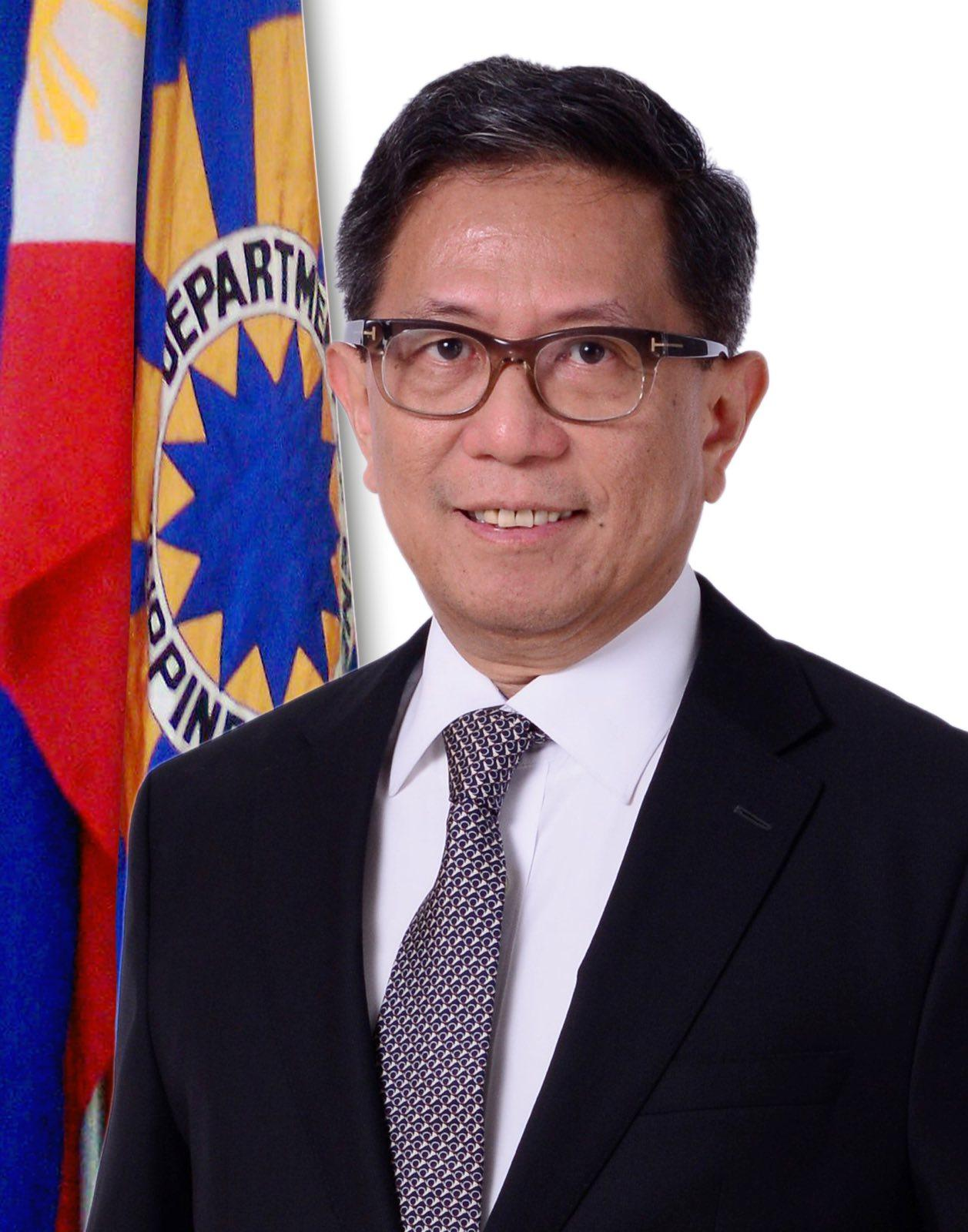
- Lotilla as DOE Secretary, Official portrait, 2022.

Ambassador of the Philippines to the Holy See
- Incumbent
- Assumed office February 27, 2026
- President: Bongbong Marcos
- Preceded by: Myla Grace Ragenia C. Macahilig

33rd Secretary of Environment and Natural Resources
- In office May 23, 2025 – February 27, 2026
- President: Bongbong Marcos
- Preceded by: Toni Yulo-Loyzaga
- Succeeded by: Juan Miguel T. Cuna

7th and 13th Secretary of Energy
- In office July 11, 2022 – May 23, 2025
- President: Bongbong Marcos
- Preceded by: Alfonso Cusi
- Succeeded by: Sharon Garin (OIC)
- In office March 22, 2005 – July 18, 2007
- President: Gloria Macapagal Arroyo
- Preceded by: Vincent S. Perez
- Succeeded by: Angelo Reyes

Personal details
- Born: June 16, 1958 (age 68) Sibalom, Antique, Philippines
- Education: University of the Philippines Diliman (B.S., B.A., LL.B); University of Michigan (LL.M)
- Occupation: Professor, businessman, government official
- Profession: Lawyer

Raphael Perpetuo "Popo'" Mercado Lotilla (born June 16, 1958) is a Filipino lawyer, businessman, and Philippine ambassador to the Holy See. He previously served as the 33rd Secretary of Environment and Natural Resources from 2025 to 2026, under Bongbong Marcos, and was the 7th and 13th secretary of energy under presidents Gloria Macapagal Arroyo (2005–2007) and Bongbong Marcos (2022–2025), respectively.

== Early life and education ==
Lotilla was born on June 16, 1958, in Sibalom, Antique. His brother, Jose Perpetuo Lotilla, is a lawyer who is an independent director of Security Bank and a former Transportation and Communications undersecretary, and ran in the 2016 Philippine House of Representatives elections as the second nominee of the Ang Kasangga party-list.

Lotilla studied at the University of the Philippines Diliman, where he obtained his Bachelor of Science in Psychology (1980), Bachelor of Arts in History, and Bachelor of Laws (1984). He then attended the University of Michigan, where he obtained his Master of Laws in 1987.

== Career ==
Lotilla began his career as an assistant professor of law in 1985 at the University of the Philippines Diliman. He was also an adjunct faculty at the Asian Institute of Management.

Lotilla also served as a legal consultant at the Office of the Senate President, Senate Committee on Foreign Relations, and for some senators beginning in 1987. He was also named as the legal adviser of the National Economic and Development Authority in 1990.

Lotilla served as PSALM Chief Operating Officer. He served as president and chief executive officer of the Power Sector Assets and Liabilities Management Corporation (PSALM).

He was Deputy Director-General (DDG) from 1996 to January 2004. He was the supervising official of the secretariat of the Legislative-Executive Development Advisory Council (LEDAC). As adviser of LEDAC, his key reform bill was the Electric Power Industry Reform Act of 2001 that privatized the power sector's entire supply chain.

Lotilla's first term as the secretary of energy was under President Gloria Macapagal Arroyo from 2005 to 2007. His second term began on July 11, 2022, under President Bongbong Marcos.

On May 22, 2025, President Marcos ordered members of his cabinet to tender their courtesy resginations in the aftermath of the May 12, 2025 midterm elections. He was reassigned as Department of Environment and Natural Resources (DENR) secretary, replacing Toni Yulo-Loyzaga. On February 27, 2026, Lotilla became Philippine ambassador to the Holy See. He was replaced as DENR secretary by Juan Miguel Cuna.

Political offices
Preceded by Vincent S. Perez	Secretary of Energy; 2005–2007	Succeeded by Angelo Reyes
Preceded by Alfonso Cusi	Secretary of Energy; 2022–2025	Succeeded by Sharon Garin
Preceded by Toni Yulo-Loyzaga	Secretary of Environment and Natural Resources; 2025–2026	Succeeded by Juan Miguel Cuna (OIC)
