= Vincent S. Perez =

Filipino politician

Vincent S. Pérez
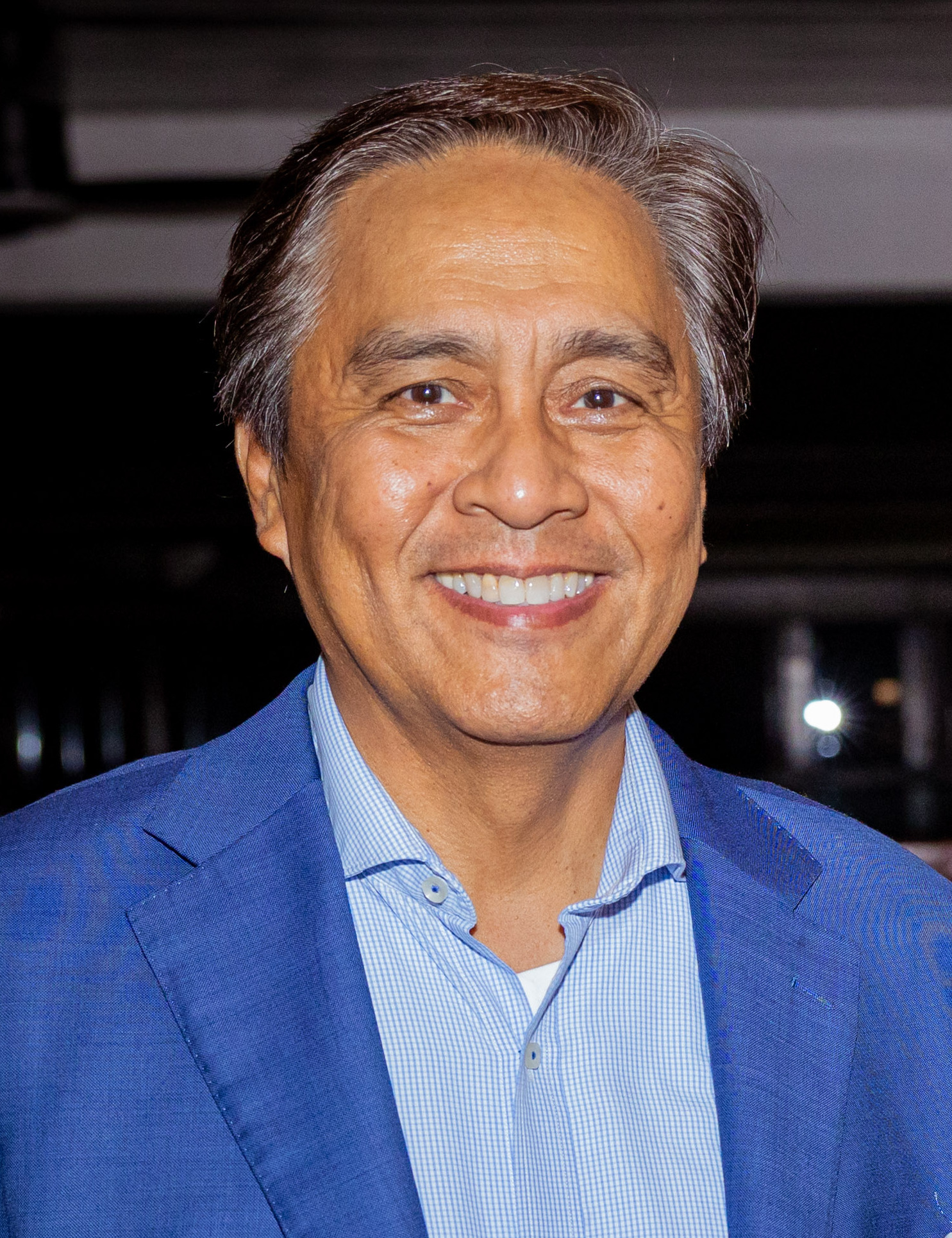
- Perez in 2023

Secretary of Energy
- In office June 8, 2001 – March 21, 2005
- President: Gloria Macapagal Arroyo
- Preceded by: Jose Isidro Camacho
- Succeeded by: Raphael P. M. Lotilla

Personal details
- Born: May 26, 1958 (age 68) Quezon City, Philippines
- Spouse(s): Leigh Talmadge; Maria Adora Pérez
- Children: 3
- Education: University of the Philippines Diliman; Wharton School of Business
- Occupation: Entrepreneur, Environment Advocate

Vicente "Vincent" Sanchez Pérez Jr. (born May 26, 1958) is a Filipino banker, environment advocate, and renewable energy investor who has served as the Philippines' secretary of energy from 2001 to 2005 under the Arroyo administration.

== Early life and education ==
Pérez is the eldest of five children of Vicente Abad Pérez Sr., a former naval officer and assistant secretary for foreign affairs, and Lucila Siongco Santiago, a dietician and nutritionist by training. His sister Sheila became a missionary, a brother Benedict is a leading Asian equity sales banker in New York, another brother Raoul is an aviation expert, while a third brother Miguel is a fintech entrepreneur. He and his brothers were educated by the Jesuits at Xavier School.

Pérez entered the University of the Philippines School of Economics and was active in extra-curricular activities, becoming national president of AIESEC Philippines, the national chapter of the international association of business and economics students. He graduated with a degree in Business Economics in 1980. After his college graduation, he took an AIESEC internship with the international department of New Jersey National Bank in Trenton, New Jersey. In 1983, Pérez earned his MBA at the Wharton School of Business of the University of Pennsylvania majoring in international finance.

== Career ==
=== Financial career ===
Upon graduation from Wharton, he joined Mellon Bank's International Banking Department in Pittsburgh and completed their international credit training program. Pérez was assigned as a Latin American credit analyst and later as Mexico and Central America desk officer. In 1985, he joined Mellon's debt trading team, and was one of the early pioneers in emerging markets debt trading, focusing on Latin American and Philippine debt.

In 1986, Pérez then joined Lazard Brothers & Co in London as part of its debt trading team. The following year he moved to Lazard Frères & Co. in New York as a debt trader and investment banker. In 1994, he became a general partner of Lazard Frères as co-head with Edgar Legaspi of its Emerging Markets Group, becoming one of the highest-ranking Asian bankers on Wall Street, and was named one of the 100 Emerging Markets Superstars by Global Finance. In 1994, Pérez relocated to Singapore as one of the founding managing directors of Lazard Asia.

In 1997, Pérez left Lazard to set up Next Century Partners, a private equity firm based in Singapore, teaming up with Patrick Go, Dennis Mendiola, John Wallace, and Eduardo Martinez-Miranda. They invested in companies such as Smart Communications, Del Monte Pacific, and those involved in semiconductor assembly. Among the co-investors of Next Century Partners were Soros Fund, Mitsui, and one of the Bass brothers of Fort Worth, Texas.

=== Government ===
In early 2001, Pérez was recruited by his former academic adviser and then-newly sworn Philippine president Gloria Macapagal Arroyo to join her administration. He served briefly as undersecretary for industry at the Department of Trade and Industry and as managing head of the Board of Investments. He then served from 2001 to 2005 in the Cabinet of Gloria Macapagal Arroyo as Energy Secretary. As such, Pérez boosted energy self-sufficiency, promoted clean indigenous energy, and crafted an ambitious renewable policy framework. He dealt with solving the frequent grid-wide power black-outs that were hampering the economy then, and had to secure the oil supply of the country in the wake of the 2003 Iraq War by pursuing energy diplomacy in Asia and the Middle East. As chair of an ASEAN Energy Ministers meeting, Pérez led the ASEAN Plan of Action for Energy Cooperation for 2004–2009, setting for the first time a regional commitment to attain a minimum 10% of power mix in renewable energy. He hosted the first ministerial meeting of ASEAN Plus 3 (China, Japan and Korea) energy ministers in June 2004. After overseeing a major restructuring of the Philippine power sector and having initiated the privatization of generation assets of the state-owned National Power Corporation (Napocor), he resigned in March 2005. With four years of government service, Pérez was one of the longest-serving members of Arroyo's economic team and was cited as the last of her "touted trio of Wall Street-bred economic managers".

In announcing his resignation, Malacañang Palace issued a statement from Arroyo citing Pérez's "crucial role in implementing difficult power sector reforms, reorganizing the public energy sector, jump-starting the much-awaited privatization of Napocor, and ensuring no more Luzon-wide blackouts since May 2002". The President underscored the "valuable contributions made by Secretary Pérez in the country’s quest for energy independence through greater reliance on clean, indigenous and sustainable energy sources", noting that since 2001, the country has increased its use of indigenous natural gas and geothermal power.

=== Return to private sector ===
Since his return to the private sector in 2005, Pérez has been active in renewable power, energy advisory, and conservation issues. He was a 2005 World Fellow at Yale University, where he lectured an MBA class on renewable power in emerging countries. Upon his return in 2006, Pérez and former energy officials Jocot de Dios and Lea Ricolcol, founded Merritt Partners, an energy advisory firm. That same year, he was invited by the owners of NorthWind, the first wind farm in Southeast Asia, to replace a minority shareholder, and that led him to a decade-long career investing in renewable energy. In 2008, Pérez and his partners founded Alternergy, a renewable power company focused on wind and run-of-the-river hydro, and built the Pililla Wind Farm in partnership with Equis Funds. Subsequently, in 2013, he co-founded Solar Pacific, a solar PV developer, with Michael Lichtenfeld and the Sant Foundation. As a private citizen, he was dispatched as Special Presidential Envoy by President Arroyo on economic diplomacy overseas. In 2009, Pérez was appointed as vice chairman of the National Renewable Energy Board.

On March 19, 2024, the Department of Energy awarded Perez’s Alternergy Holding Corp. a “Certificate of Confirmation of Commerciality” which essentially is a green light for its Alabat and Tanay wind projects. Earlier, on December 20, 2023, it received P1.45 billion from Government Service Insurance System for its clean energy projects, effectively bringing its equity capital to P3 billion. GSIS subscribed to 100 million of Alternergy’s preferred stock at P14.50 per share under a private placement. Alternergy also raised P1.62 billion from its initial public offering in March, 2023.

=== Independent business activities ===
Pérez has been an independent director of regional companies in Australia, the Philippines, and Singapore. He is an independent director of ST Telemedia and Banco de Oro. He is a member of the advisory boards of Bhutan Foundation, New Zealand Trade and Enterprise, Geneva-based Pictet Clean Energy Fund, and the Yale Center for Business and the Environment.

Pérez and his family have had a long affinity with the island of Palawan. He and his brother Miguel set up Stellar Sea Farms to raise red tilapia in sea cages in Culion. They once owned Puerco Island in Green Island Bay and currently own Dilumacad or Helicopter Island in El Nido. In 2000, he co-founded Asian Conservation Company, an innovative venture philanthropy with like-minded conservationists, and together they acquired El Nido Resorts. With a management team from Next Century Partners, they transformed it into an award-winning eco-tourism destination in Palawan and then sold it to Ayala Land in 2013.

== Philanthropy ==
His philanthropy is dedicated to the environment and conservation. Pérez has long been involved with World Wide Fund for Nature (WWF) starting with arranging debt-for-nature swaps. He was a founding trustee of WWF-Philippines in 1996 and is a member of its national advisory council. Pérez was elected to the International Board of WWF, the governing body of the global WWF network, and a member of the boards of WWF-China and WWF-US. He was active with Malampaya Foundation, Sikat Solar Car Challenge Foundation, Stiftung Solarenergie Foundation, and in marine conservation through Asian Conservation Foundation.

== Writings ==
Pérez has written a few publications: “Chasing Moonlight” narrated a sailing voyage during his 50th year; “Chasing Sunsets”, a compilation of 58 haiku poetry of his travels; and “Chasing Cherry Blossoms”, a hiking travelogue with his three brothers in Japan. He co-published “Voices from the Islands” featuring how El Nido Resorts became a showcase of sustainable tourism. He was also a contributor to a marine biological publication on scallops in Palawan waters.

== Personal life ==
Pérez and his wife, Maria Adora, reside in Manila and Melbourne, and they have three sons and one daughter.

Pérez is fond of the sea and used to do salt-water fishing and sailing. Together with his sailing buddy Judes Echauz, they won the Rolex China Sea Race on their yacht Subic Centennial, first in 1998 and again in 2008.

Government offices
Preceded by Jose Isidro Camacho	Secretary of Energy; 2001–2005	Succeeded by Raphael Lotilla
