= Jose Isidro Camacho =

Filipino banker

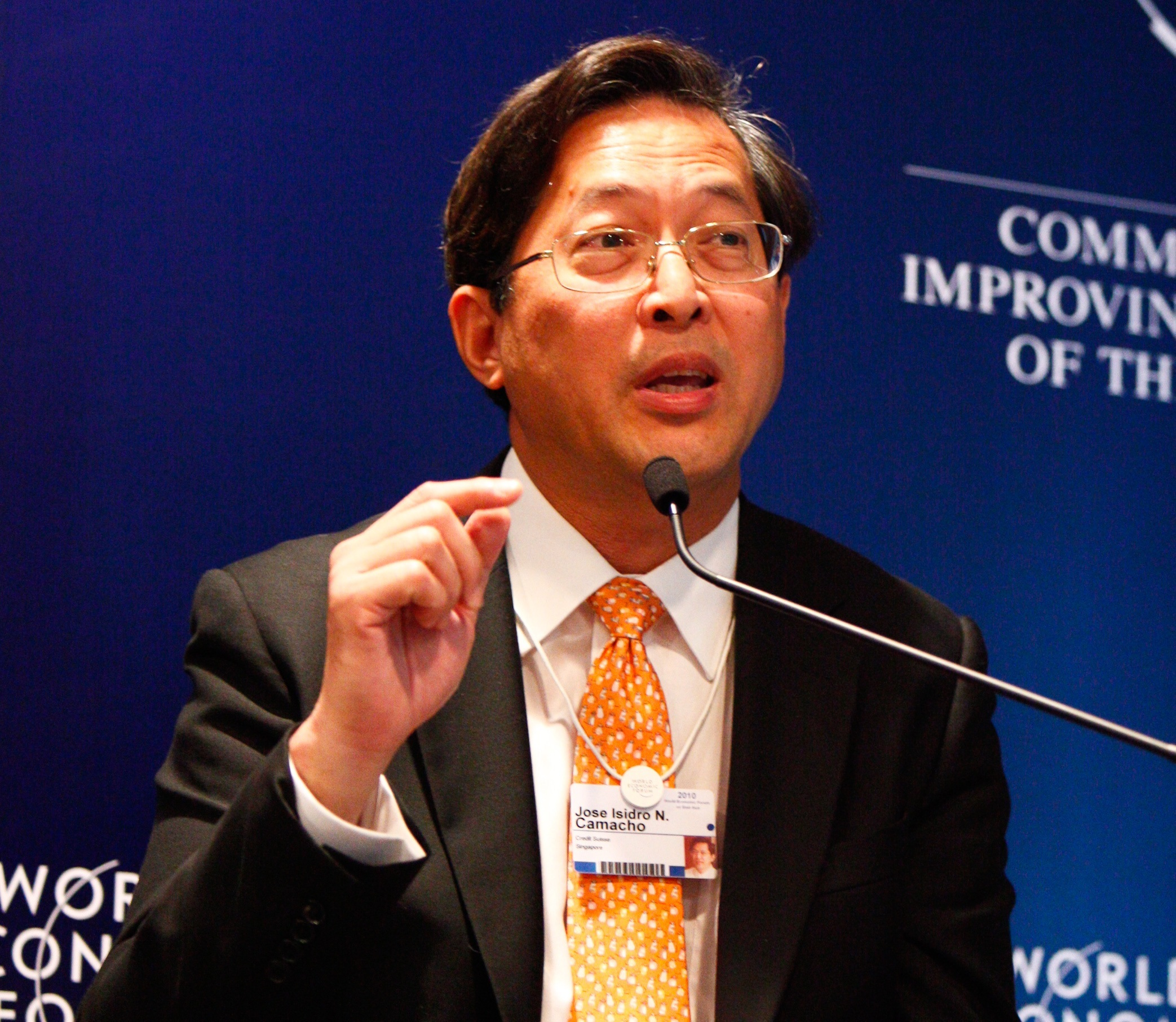
- Jose Isidro Camacho at the World Economic Forum on East Asia in 2010

Chairperson of University of the Arts Singapore
- Incumbent
- Assumed office September 1, 2024
- Preceded by: Inaugural Holder

Philippine Secretary of Finance
- In office June 15, 2001 – November 30, 2003
- President: Gloria Macapagal Arroyo
- Preceded by: Alberto Romulo
- Succeeded by: Juanita Amatong

Philippine Secretary of Energy
- In office March 1, 2001 – June 15, 2001
- President: Gloria Macapagal Arroyo
- Preceded by: Mario Tiaoqui
- Succeeded by: Vincent S. Perez

Personal details
- Born: Jose Isidro Navato Camacho; July 20, 1955 (age 71) Balanga, Bataan, Philippines
- Spouse: Ma. Clara "Kim" Acuña
- Children: Bea, Lorenzo, Carlos, Anuncia, Joaquin and Simon
- Education: De La Salle University (AB); Harvard University (MBA)

Jose Isidro "Lito" Navato Camacho is a Filipino banker who served as the Philippines' Secretary of Energy and later on as Finance under President Gloria Macapagal Arroyo.

After his short stint in the government, he returned to the private sector, and now serves as Vice-Chairman of Credit Suisse of Asia–Pacific and its Singapore Country Chief Executive Officer; Non-Executive Chairman of Sun Life of Canada (Philippines); director of SymAsia Foundation (Singapore), and member of the board of National Gallery Singapore. He is also a member of the Group of Experts of the ASEAN Capital Markets Forum, Singapore's Securities Industry Council, and the International Advisory Panel of the Securities Commission of Malaysia.

== Personal life ==
Camacho was born in Balanga, Bataan to Teodoro Camacho, Jr. and Leonarda Navato. His grandfather, Teodoro Camacho, Sr. was congressman and governor of Bataan.

He finished high school Don Bosco Technical Institute in Mandaluyong in 1972, and in 1975 he graduated cum laude with an A.B. Mathematics degree from De La Salle University in Manila. He studied and obtained an MBA with a concentration on Finance from Harvard Graduate School of Business Administration in the United States in 1979.

Camacho's met his wife Kim, also Filipino, when they were both studying at Harvard Business School in the 1970s. In the early 2000s, Kim was the country manager and representative for the auction house Sotheby’s. The Camacho couple have one of the world’s most comprehensive collections of Yayoi Kusama's works of art, which includes the longest work of Kusama, a 100 meter long soft sculpture. Owning more than a hundred pieces, eight works from the Camachos’ collection were loaned and exhibited in Spain’s Guggenheim Bilbao museum. They loaned nine pieces of their collection to the Yayoi Kusama exhibition held at the National Gallery Victoria (NGV) in Melbourne, Australia in December 15, 2024 to April 21, 2025. Camacho and wife started collecting artwork by Filipino Modern masters shortly after they got married, and then later expanded their collection to include Gutai artists and works by Alfonso Ossorio. Three of their six children are fine arts graduates.

In 2024, Camacho became chairman of the Board of Trustees of the then newly-established University of the Arts Singapore. He has served on the boards of the National Heritage Board, National Gallery Singapore, NTU Centre for Contemporary Art Singapore, and STPI Creative Workshop & Gallery. The Camacho couple does philanthropic work with Scholas Occurrentes, a non-profit organization with educational initiatives for young people that was founded by Pope Francis in 2013.

== Professional career ==
After college, Camacho worked at Banco Filipino, before he left to pursue graduate studies in the United States. Upon his return to the Philippines, he went back to the banking industry, and in 1995 became Senior Managing Director and Country Head of Bankers Trust New York. Later on, he became Managing Director and Chief Country Officer of Deutsche Bank in the Philippines. From 1999 to 2000, he was Managing Director and chief of Country Coverage for Investment Banking for the Asian Region of Deutsche Bank based in Singapore.

After serving in the Arroyo administration in 2005, Camacho and his wife returned to Singapore and joined investment bank and financial services firm Credit Suisse Singapore and became its CEO from 2007 to 2016. In June 2024, he was elected chairman of the board of the mining company Nickel Asia Corporation.

== Government service ==
Camacho was appointed Energy Secretary by Philippine President Gloria Macapagal Arroyo when she took office in 2001. During his tenure, much needed reforms in the country's power sector were passed into law.

On his third month as Energy Secretary, he was reassigned by Macapagal-Arroyo as Secretary of Finance, a post he held until November 2003 when he returned to the private sector. Upon his resignation as Secretary, news of the President's inaction on Camacho's recommendations for the Government Service Insurance System was perceived to have prompted it. His resignation brought anxieties and uncertainties in the government and caused the peso to plummet against the dollar to a record low. Camacho was recognized for his significant contributions in managing and stabilizing the country's fiscal deficit, and was even acknowledged by several groups of businessmen and investors as one of the best Finance secretaries the Philippines has ever had. The country's Anti-Money Laundering Law (R.A. 9160) was also passed under his tenure.

Government offices
Preceded by Alberto Romulo	Secretary of Budget and Management; 2001–2003	Succeeded by Juanita Amatong
Preceded by Mario Tiaoqui	Secretary of Energy; 2001	Succeeded by Vincent S. Perez
