= AAMBIS-Owa Party List =

Political organization in the Philippines

AAMBIS-Owa
- — Philippine partylist —
- Full name: Ang Asosasyon Sang Mangunguma Nga Bisaya-Owa Mangunguma, Inc.
- Sector(s) represented: Farmers
- Ideology: Agrarianism
- Colors: Yellow

Current representation (19th Congress)
- Seats in the House of Representatives: 1 / 3 (Out of 63 party-list seats)
- Representative(s): Lex Anthony Colada

Ang Asosasyon Sang Mangunguma Nga Bisaya-Owa Mangunguma, Inc., also known as the AAMBIS-Owa Party List, is a political organization based in Western Visayas with representation in the House of Representatives of the Philippines. It aims to represent the interest of Filipino farmers.

== History ==
=== 18th Congress ===
Ang Asosasyon Sang Mangunguma Nga Bisaya-Owa Mangunguma (AAMBIS-Owa Party-list) participated in the 2019 House of Representatives elections where it won a seat for the 18th Congress. As a party-list its stated constituents are Filipino farmers. Sharon Garin, who has been AAMBIS-Owa's representative since 2010 in the 15th Congress, retained her seat in the House of Representatives. Garin belongs to a political family: her cousin Jimmy Garin is also a partylist nominee for the 2019 election and her brother Richard Garin is a former congressman.

As representative, Garin proposed various measures concerning agriculture. She filed a bill proposing to amend the Customs Modernization and Tariffication Act (CMTA), which would enable the government to better deal with agricultural smuggling and improve trade facilitation. Garin also filed a bill that would require labels and health warnings on e-cigarettes to protect the interest of tobacco farmers.

The partylist also facilitated the Department of Labor and Employment's Tulong Panghanapbuhay sa Ating Disadvantaged/Displaced Workers (TUPAD) program in the Western Visayas, although AAMBIS-Owa itself did not fund the program.

== Electoral performance ==
Election	Votes	%	Party-list seats
2010	357,804	1.19%	1 / 57
2013	312,312	1.13%	1 / 58
2016	495,483	1.53%	1 / 59
2019	234,552	0.85%	1 / 61
2022	246,053	0.67%	1 / 63

== Representatives to Congress ==
Period	Representative
15th Congress; 2010–2013	Sharon Garin
16th Congress; 2013–2016	Sharon Garin
17th Congress; 2016–2019	Sharon Garin
18th Congress; 2019–2022	Sharon Garin
19th Congress; 2022–2025	Lex Anthony Colada
Note: A party-list group, can win a maximum of three seats in the House of Representatives.
