= Prospero Amatong =

Filipino politician

Prospero S. Amatong
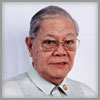

Member of the Philippine House of Representatives from Compostela Valley's Second District
- In office June 30, 1998 – June 30, 2007
- Preceded by: Post created
- Succeeded by: Rommel Amatong

Governor of Compostela Valley
- In office March 8, 1998 – March 26, 1998
- Preceded by: Post created
- Succeeded by: Luz M. Sarmiento

Governor of Davao del Norte
- In office February 2, 1988 – March 8, 1998
- Preceded by: Cecilia Dela Paz
- Succeeded by: Anecito M. Solis
- In office March 25, 1986 – November 30, 1987
- Preceded by: Gregorio Dujali
- Succeeded by: Romeo Jardinico

Mayor of Nabunturan
- In office December 30, 1980 – March 26, 1986
- Preceded by: Zosimo A. Bugas
- Succeeded by: Venancio C. Piastro
- In office January 1, 1972 – September 28, 1977
- Preceded by: Venancio C. Piastro
- Succeeded by: Zosimo A. Bugas

Personal details
- Born: Prospero Sybico Amatong; October 18, 1931 Dipolog, Zamboanga Province, Philippine Islands
- Died: May 16, 2009 (aged 77) New York City, United States
- Party: Lakas-CMD (1991-2009)
- Spouse: Luz Caños
- Relations: Jacobo Amatong (brother); Isagani Amatong (brother); Ernesto Amatong (brother); Juanita Amatong (sister-in-law)
- Parent(s): Amando Borja Amatong; Felicidad Mabanag Sybico

Prospero Sybico Amatong (October 18, 1931 – May 16, 2009) was a Filipino politician. Amatong served as the governor of Davao del Norte from 1986 to 1987 and from 1988 until 1998 and as a Congressman in the House of Representatives of the Philippines from 1998 until 2007. He also served as interim governor of Compostela Valley upon its creation.

== Early years ==
Prospero Sybico Amatong was born in Dipolog, Province of Zamboanga, on October 18, 1931, to Amando Borja Amatong and Felicidad Mabanag Sybico who were founders of Andres Bonifacio College. He earned his bachelor's degree in civil engineering. He moved to Nabunturan in 1960, where he taught at Assumption College from 1960 until 1971.

== Political career ==
Prospero's career in politics began in 1963 with his election as a Nabunturan city council member. He was elected the Mayor of Nabunturan in 1972, an office he held for 14 years. He also served as the mayor of New Corella early in his career.

Amatong was elected the Governor of Davao del Norte, which consisted of 21 towns, in 1992. As governor, Amatong spearheaded the creation of a new province Compostela Valley, which consists eleven municipalities which were formerly part of Davao del Norte.

Amatong became the interim governor of the newly created Compostela Valley province for three months in 1998. He was later elected to the House of Representatives, representing Compostela Valley's second congressional district as a congressman. Amatong remained in Congress until his retirement in 2007. His son, Rep. Rommel Amatong, was elected as his successor in the district in 2007.

Throughout his long political career, no complaints were ever filed against him by the Ombudsman. Politicians from both Davao del Norte and Compostela Valley continued to consult Amatong following his retirement, earning him the nickname as the "grand old man" of Davao politics.

== Personal life ==
Prospero Amatong suffered a fall in a New York City park in May 2009 while on vacation with his wife, Luz, their children and other family members. He was hospitalized with head injuries, leaving him in a coma. Amatong died in a New York City hospital on May 16, 2009, at the age of 77. His body was flown back to the Philippines for burial.

Tributes poured in following news of Amatong's unexpected death. Compostela Valley Governor Arturo Uy called Amatong, "...exceptional as a leader, a master politician. I would say no one could ever duplicate his performance in our lifetime. He is the real Mr. Service." Laak Mayor Reynaldo Navarro referred to Amatong as, "a legend, a real champion who has never tasted defeat." Former Davao del Norte Vice Governor Victorio Suaybaguio Jr., a friend of Amatong during his governorship, spoke of him, "am saddened by the death of a great man whose life was dedicated to mankind. It's a loss to all of us. My prayers to the bereaved family. Farewell my brother." Davao del Norte Gov. Rodolfo del Rosario also sent condolences to Amatong's family.
