= Commission on Higher Education =

Commission attached to the Office of the President of the Philippines

- Komisyon sa Mas Mataas na Edukasyon; Komisyon sa Lalong Mataas na Edukasyon
- Seal

- Headquarters of CHED in Quezon City

Agency overview
- Formed: May 18, 1994; 32 years ago
- Jurisdiction: Philippines
- Headquarters: HEDC Building, C.P. Garcia Avenue, Diliman, Quezon City
- Employees: 517 (2024)
- Annual budget: ▲PH₱47 billion (2026)
- Agency executives: Shirley C. Agrupis, Chairman; Michelle A. Ong, Commissioner; Myrna Q. Mallari, Commissioner; Ricmar P. Aquino, Commissioner; Desiderio R. Apag III, Commissioner; Atty. Cinderella Filipina Benitez-Jaro, Executive Director
- Parent agency: Office of the President of the Philippines
- Website: www.ched.gov.ph

The Commission on Higher Education (CHED; Filipino: Komisyon sa Mas Mataas na Edukasyon or Komisyon sa Lalong Mataas na Edukasyon) is a government agency under the Office of the President of the Philippines. It is responsible for regulating and governing all higher education institutions and post-secondary educational programs in the country.

== History ==
The CHED was established on May 18, 1994, through Republic Act No. 7722 or the Higher Education Act of 1994.

In July 2025, the Unified Student Financial Assistance System for Tertiary Education (UniFAST), under the Commission on Higher Education (CHED), opened applications for its annual scholarship and grant programs supporting Filipino students.

== Governance ==
The CHED is headed by a Chairperson and four Commissioners appointed by the President. On January 22, 2024, the Office of the President of the Philippines imposed a 90-day preventive suspension order against Commissioner Aldrin A. Darilag who was accused of grave misconduct, neglect in the performance of duty and abuse of authority or oppression.

On March 12, 2024, Darilag filed with the Ombudsman of the Philippines against Chairman de Vera III a 5-page complaint for graft and corruption and grave abuse of authority charges, under R.A. 3019, the "Anti-Graft and Corrupt Practices Act". "Respondent De Vera would like me to support Aspen as a supplier of CHED even though it did not comply with the requirements stipulated in Republic Act 9184, otherwise known as the procurement law. He even asked me to have a meeting with Aspen representatives, which I refused to do," Darilag's sworn affidavit read.

J. Prospero de Vera III submitted his courtesy resignation on May 29, 2025, amid the 2025 Philippine cabinet reshuffle. President Bongbong Marcos appointed Shirley Agrupis as the new chairperson.

== Chairpersons ==
No.	Name	Term started	Term ended
1	Ricardo Gloria	May 18, 1994	June 30, 1995
2	Angel Alcala	June 30, 1995	July 11, 1999
3	Ester Albano-Garcia	July 11, 1999	May 31, 2003
4	Bro. Rolando Ramos Dizon, FSC	June 2, 2003	October 17, 2004
5	Rolando de la Rosa, O.P.	October 18, 2004	April 30, 2005
6	Carlito S. Puno	May 3, 2005	August 15, 2007
7	Romulo L. Neri	August 15, 2007	August 1, 2008
8	Nona S. Ricafort	August 1, 2008	August 31, 2008
9	Emmanuel Y. Angeles	August 31, 2008	June 30, 2010
10	Patricia B. Licuanan	June 30, 2010	January 15, 2018
11	J. Prospero E. de Vera III	January 24, 2018	May 29, 2025
12	Shirley C. Agrupis	May 29, 2025	Incumbent

== CHED Center of Excellence ==
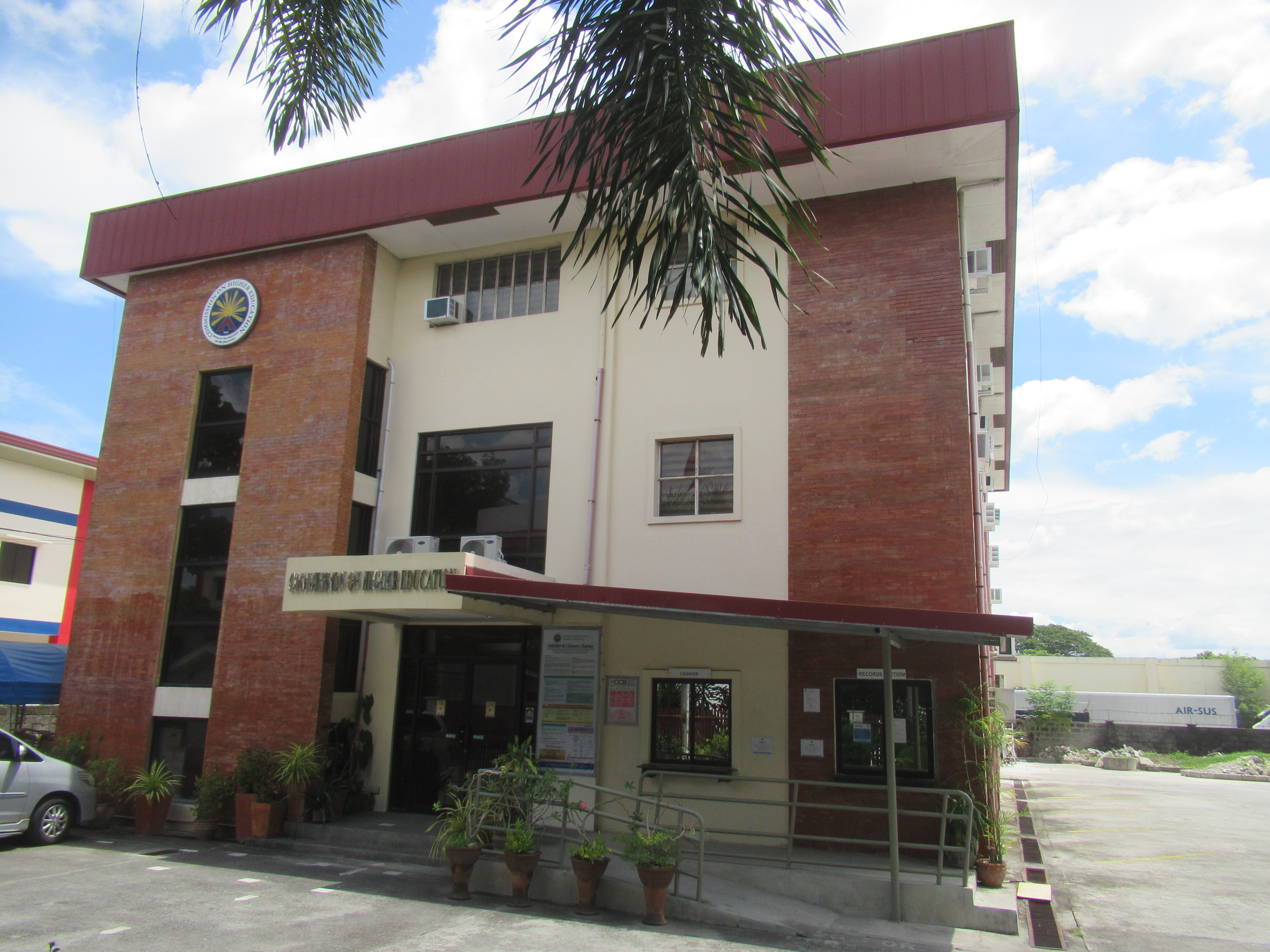
CHED San Fernando, Pampanga

The CHED awards Center of Excellence status to departments within higher education institutions that "demonstrate excellent performance in the areas of instruction, research and publication, extension and linkages and institutional qualifications". It also grants Center of Development status to departments that "demonstrate the potential to become a Center of Excellence".

== See also ==
- Higher education in the Philippines
- Professional Regulation Commission
