= Carlito Puno =

Philippine technocrat

Carlito Serrano Puno is a Philippine technocrat who had served has chair of the Commission on Higher Education from 2005 to 2007. He had also led the United Coconut Chemicals company from 2007 until the firm's closure in 2012.

Puno is the brother of former Philippine Chief Justice Reynato Puno.
