= Rommel Amatong =

Filipino politician

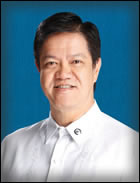
- Official portrait, 2013

Member of the Philippine House of Representatives from Compostela Valley's Second District
- In office June 30, 2007 – June 30, 2016
- Preceded by: Prospero Amatong
- Succeeded by: Ruwel Peter S. Gonzaga

Personal details
- Born: October 5, 1961 (age 65)
- Party: Aksyon (2015–present)
- Other political affiliations: Lakas-CMD (2007–2012); Liberal (2011–2015)
- Spouse: Emma Tuliao Amatong
- Relations: Juanita Amatong (aunt); Ernesto Amatong (uncle); Isagani Amatong (uncle); Jacobo Amatong (uncle)
- Parent(s): Prospero Amatong; Luz Caños
- Profession: Politician civil engineering

Rommel Caños Amatong (born October 5, 1961) is a Filipino politician. A member of the Lakas–CMD, he was elected as a Member of the House of Representatives of the Philippines, representing the Second District of Compostela Valley beginning in 2007. He succeeded his father, Prospero Amatong, who represented the same district from 1998 until his retirement in 2007. He is an engineer by profession.

== Notes ==
House of Representatives of the Philippines
Preceded by Prospero Amatong	Representative, 2nd District of Compostela Valley; 2007–2016	Succeeded by Ruwel Peter S. Gonzaga
