= Alfonso Cusi =

Filipino businessman, civil servant and politician

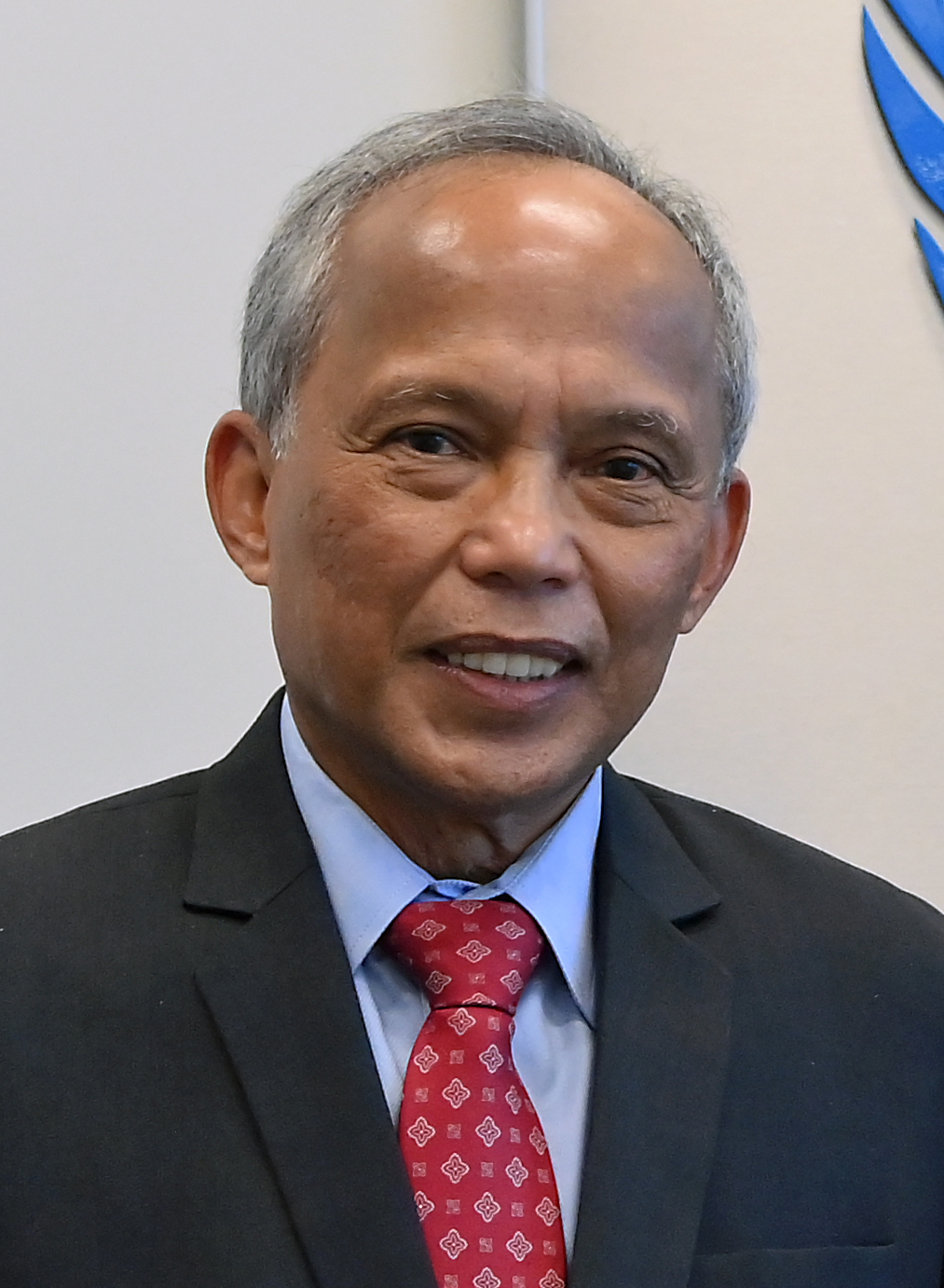
- Cusi in 2022

14th Secretary of Energy
- In office June 30, 2016 – June 30, 2022
- President: Rodrigo Duterte
- Preceded by: Zenaida Monsada
- Succeeded by: Raphael P. M. Lotilla

Director-General of the Civil Aviation Authority of the Philippines
- In office March 2010 – December 2010
- President: Gloria Macapagal Arroyo; Benigno Aquino III

General Manager of the Manila International Airport Authority
- In office August 2004 – March 2010
- President: Gloria Macapagal Arroyo

General Manager of the Philippine Ports Authority
- In office February 2001 – July 2004
- President: Gloria Macapagal Arroyo

Personal details
- Born: Alfonso Gaba Cusi; December 5, 1949 (age 76) Roxas, Oriental Mindoro, Philippines
- Party: PDP–Laban
- Spouse: Maria Angeles S. Cusi
- Education: University of St. La Salle (BS); University of the Philippines Visayas Cebu College (MBA)
- Profession: Businessman, government administrator

Alfonso "Al" Gaba Cusi (Tagalog pronunciation: [ˈkusɪ]; born December 5, 1949) is a Filipino businessman from Naujan, Oriental Mindoro who served as the 14th Secretary of Energy under the Duterte administration from 2016 to 2022. He also served in the Arroyo Administration as head of government air and sea transportation agencies from 2001 to 2010. He is the Vice Chairman of Partido Demokratiko Pilipino, after becoming president of the party then known as PDP–Laban in 2021.

Cusi and other Department of Energy officials face graft charges, neglect of duty, and grave misconduct before the Office of the Ombudsman over the buyout of Malampaya Philippines Pte. of 45% Chevron Philippines' stake in the Malampaya gas field in Palawan.

== Early life and education ==
Cusi was born in the municipality of Roxas, Oriental Mindoro. He graduated at the University of St. La Salle in Bacolod (then known as La Salle College Bacolod), earning a Bachelor of Science degree in 1972. He also attended the University of the Philippines Cebu, then a college of the University of the Philippines Visayas, and received a Master of Business Administration in 1976.

== Career and businesses ==
Alfonso joined Aboitiz Shipping Corp., and while working there, he simultaneously obtained his Master’s degree in Business from the University of the Philippines. Eventually, he struck out on his own, venturing into entrepreneurship in 1991.

Cusi’s commitment to public service unfolded in 2001 when he assumed a key position at the Philippine Ports Authority. Here, he introduced passenger terminals across ports for public safety, played a pivotal role in the Strong Republic Nautical Highway Project, and established a cruise ship terminal in Manila. His leadership continued at the Manila International Airport Authority in 2004, addressing terminal issues and elevating standards. His sweeping achievements in both the public and private sectors at this point were quickly recognized, earning him a Doctorate of Philosophy in Business from the Polytechnic University of the Philippines in 2007.

In 2010, Cusi took on the role of CAAP Director General, preventing the downgrade of Philippine aviation. Returning to private business after GMA’s term, he initiated the fleet modernization of Starlite Ferries in 2011, setting industry standards.

== Controversies ==
=== Complaints against media outlets ===
In 2021, Cusi filed libel and cyberlibel complaints against seven news organizations over their stories on the Malampaya deal, which detailed graft charges filed against him and businessman Dennis Uy. On June 24, 2022, before his term as Energy Secretary ended, Cusi, through an affidavit of desistance filed in the Taguig City's Prosecutor Office, withdrew these complaints.

Political offices
Preceded by Zenaida Monsada	Secretary of Energy; 2016–2022	Succeeded by Raphael P.M. Lotilla
Party political offices
Preceded by Manny Pacquiao	President of PDP–Laban; 2021–2022	Succeeded by Jose Alvarez
