= Juanita Amatong =

Filipina politician

Juanita D. Amatong

Philippine Secretary of Finance
- In office December 1, 2003 – February 14, 2005
- President: Gloria Macapagal Arroyo
- Preceded by: Jose Isidro Camacho
- Succeeded by: Cesar Purisima

Personal details
- Born: March 23, 1935 (age 91) Bindoy, Negros Oriental, Philippines
- Spouse: Ernesto Sybico Amatong
- Relations: Isagani S. Amatong (brother-in-law); Prospero Amatong (brother-in-law); Jacobo Amatong (brother-in-law); Rommel Amatong (nephew)
- Children: 3
- Education: Silliman University (BA, PhD) Syracuse University (MA)

Juanita Amatong (née Dy; born March 23, 1935) is a Filipino banker, educator, and former public servant. She previously served as member of the Monetary Board of the Philippines, a policy-making body of the Bangko Sentral ng Pilipinas (Central Bank of the Philippines), and former Secretary of Finance in the Gloria Macapagal Arroyo administration. Amatong has been in government service since 1971 starting as Senior Financial Analyst. Prior to her appointment as Secretary, she served as Undersecretary and eventually as Acting Secretary of the Department of Finance. She also served as the first woman executive director in the World Bank Group from the Philippines.

== Education ==
Amatong graduated from Bindoy Elementary School in Bindoy, Negros Oriental, and finished her secondary education at Silliman University. She obtained her bachelor's degree in Business Administration from Silliman University as cum laude, and pursued a master's degree in Economics and Public Administration from Syracuse University in New York.

She further pursued her Post-Graduate Seminar on Public Enterprises at Harvard University, Cambridge, Massachusetts, and earned her Doctor of Philosophy in Social Sciences from Silliman University.

== Career ==
Prior to her entry in the government service, she worked as an associate professor at Silliman University from 1959 to 1960, as tax economist for the International Monetary Fund (IMF) from 1963 to 1968, and as a lecturer at the Andres Bonifacio College in Dipolog, Zamboanga del Norte in 1968–1971.

== Personal life ==
She is married to Ernesto Sybico Amatong, a former member of the Batasang Pambansa, former congressman of Zamboanga del Norte's 2nd legislative district, and one of the delegates to the 1971 Constitutional Convention.

== Footnotes ==
Government offices
Preceded by Jose Isidro Camacho	Secretary of Finance; 2003 – 2005	Succeeded by Margarito Teves
