= Coal mining in the Philippines =

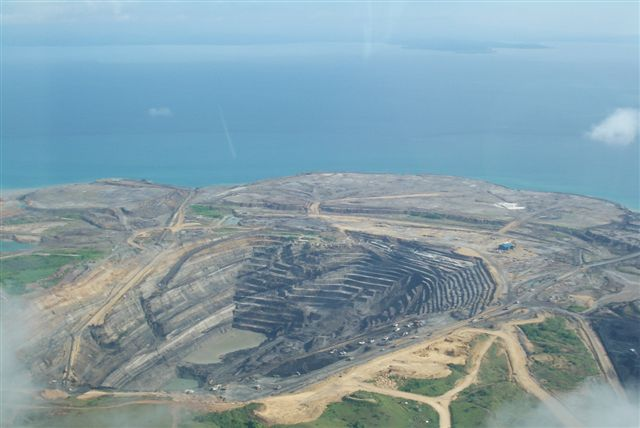
Panian mine in Semirara Island.

Panian mine rehabilitation

Coal mining in the Philippines has a long history dating back to the 1800s during the Spanish colonization of the islands. The Philippines consumes more coal than it can produce and coal is the main source of electricity. 20% of the country's coal supply is used by the cement industry (in 2005).

As of September 31, 2005, the in situ coal reserves of the Philippines amounts to 458 million metric tons which is about 18% of the country's total coal resource potential amounting 2.53 billion metric tons (2.49 billion long tons).

75% of the country's coal supply is imported. In the 1990s, the country saw increase in the import of coal due to large coal-fired power plants being built in the country and specifically designed to burn imported coal.

Semirara Mining and Power Corporation is the largest coal producer in the country whose primary mine is in Semirara Island. The company accounts for 92% of the country's coal production according to the Department of Energy. Panian mine is the first large-scale open-pit mine in the Philippines to be fully rehabilitated by a mining company

== History ==
=== Early history ===
Coal was first discovered in the Philippine islands in 1827 in the island of Cebu although there was little interest from the Spanish colonial government or private individuals to exploit the resource until the arrival of steamships in the archipelago. In October 17, 1842, Governor General Marcelino de Oraá Lecumberri issued a circular to alcaldes mayores and other provincial authorities regarding information about possible coal deposits in their area. While some areas report of coal deposits, there is minimal commercial exploitation of the resource. In the island of Cebu, where coal was first discovered in the islands, it was only in 1853 when the first coal concessions were granted in the island.

Starting from 1853 until 1860, saw the development of the coal-mining industry in the islands especially in the island of Cebu. The colonial government effectively had a monopoly of the industry especially after the coal mine in Guila-Guila in Cebu was put under control of the state.

Coal was first discovered in Cebu about 1837. There were 15 localities over the whole island, on both coast; some desultory mining had been carried out Naga near Mount Uling, but most serious operations were at Licos and Camansi west of Compostela and Danao. Active work ceased about 1895 with insurrections, and no production worked for more than ten years. A topographic and geologic survey of Compostela, Danao and Carmen took place in 1906. The Compostela-Danao coalfield contained about six million workable tons. The tramroads, one from Danao to Camansi, one from Compostela to Mount Licos, were undertaken in 1895, together with a wagon road built in 1877, from Cotcot to Dapdap.

== See also ==
- Mining in the Philippines

== Sources ==
- Abella y Casariego, Enrique (1886). Rápida descripcion física, geológica y minera de la Isla de Cebú (in Spanish). Madrid: Tello.
- Burritt, Charles H. (1901). "Historical Sketch of the Discovery in the Philippines". The coal measures of the Philippines : a rapid history of the discovery of coal in the archipelago and subsequent development, with the full text of the record of the MacLeod coal concession in Cebu, of the Uling-Lutac coal and railway concession. Washington, D.C: United States Division of Insular Affairs.
- Smith, Warren Du Pré (1907). Freer, Paul C.; Strong, Richard D.; Merrill, E. D. (eds.). "The geology of the Compostela-Danao coal field". Philippine Journal of Science. 2A (6): 377 ff.
