= J. Prospero de Vera III =

Filipino academic administrator

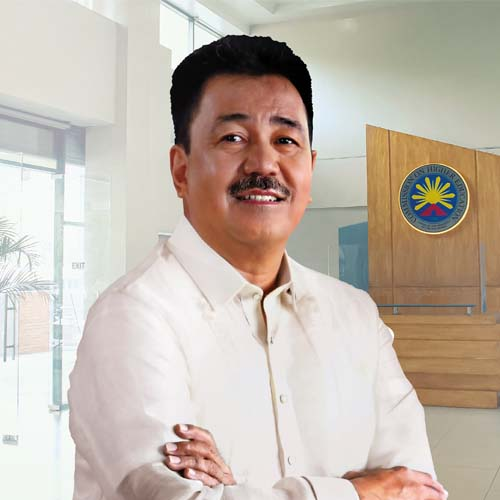
- Official portrait, 2018

11th Chairperson of the Commission on Higher Education
- In office January 24, 2018 – May 29, 2025
- President: Rodrigo Duterte; Bongbong Marcos
- Preceded by: Patricia Licuanan
- Succeeded by: Shirley Agrupis

Personal details
- Born: J. Prospero E. De Vera III
- Education: University of the Philippines Diliman (BA, DPA); De La Salle University (MA)
- Occupation: Public administrator; educator; political analyst

J. Prospero "Popoy" E. De Vera III is a Filipino public administrator, educator, and political analyst. He previously served as the chair of the Commission on Higher Education (CHED) in the Philippines from 2018 to 2025. He is also a professor at the University of the Philippines Diliman National College of Public Administration and Governance, specializing in public administration and policy studies.

== Early life and education ==
De Vera was born into a family in public service. His mother was a public school teacher and later principal at Ramon Magsaysay High School in Manila, while his father was a human rights lawyer. He and his eight siblings were raised in Metro Manila and are all products of the Philippine public education system.

He earned his Bachelor of Arts in history with a minor in political science and his Doctor of Public Administration from the University of the Philippines Diliman. He also holds a Master of Arts in Social Science from De La Salle University. Furthering his studies abroad, De Vera undertook special studies in government and politics at California State University, Sacramento and was a Fulbright-Hays Visiting Scholar at the University of Southern California. He later served as a Senior Fulbright Visiting professor at Johns Hopkins University.

== Academic and administrative career ==
=== University of the Philippines Diliman ===
De Vera has been a faculty member at the University of the Philippines Diliman since 1992, teaching courses in public administration, policy process, and national development. He served as vice president for Public Affairs of the UP System from 2011 to 2016 and directed two centers under the National College of Public Administration and Governance (NCPAG): the Center for Policy and Executive Development (CPED) and the Center for Leadership, Citizenship, and Democracy (CLCD) .

His expertise extends to legislative affairs, having served as Technical Assistant, Chief-of-Staff, and Senior Consultant to several Philippine senators, including Aquilino Pimentel Jr., Sotero Laurel, Leticia Ramos-Shahani, Juan Flavier, Ramon Magsaysay Jr., and Gregorio Honasan. In the United States, he worked as a policy analyst with the Committee on Revenue and Taxation of the California State Legislature.

=== Commission on Higher Education ===
Appointed as Commission on Higher Education Commissioner in 2016, De Vera became officer-in-charge in January 2018 and was officially appointed as chairperson in October 2018 by President Rodrigo Duterte. He was reappointed in 2022 by President Bongbong Marcos.

As CHED chairperson, De Vera oversees the governance of over 2,000 public and private higher education institutions in the Philippines, serving more than four million students and 150,000 faculty members. He also chairs the Unified Financial Assistance System for Tertiary Education, implementing the Universal Access to Quality Tertiary Education law, which provides free tuition in state universities and colleges.

During the COVID-19 pandemic, De Vera led CHED's efforts to transition to flexible learning systems and represented higher education concerns in the Inter-Agency Task Force on Emerging Infectious Diseases.

Political offices
Preceded by Patricia B. Licuanan	Chairperson of the Commission on Higher Education; 2018–2025	Succeeded by Shirley C. Agrupis
