= Secretary of Energy (Philippines) =

Energy minister of the Philippines

- Kalihim ng Enerhiya
- Official seal of the Department of Energy

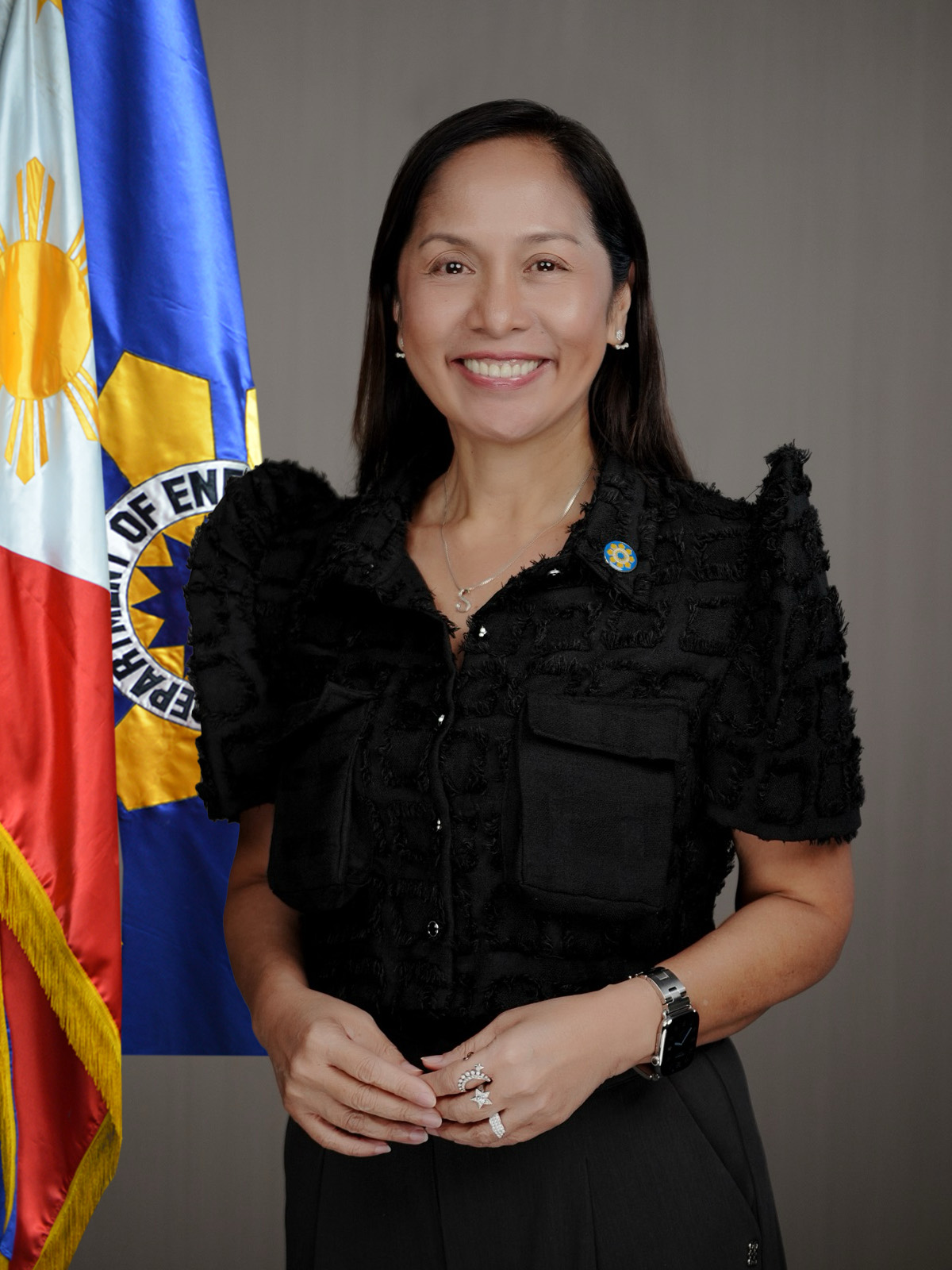
- Incumbent; Sharon S. Garin, CPA, LLB since May 23, 2025
- Style: The Honorable
- Member of: Cabinet
- Appointer: The president with the consent of the Commission on Appointments
- Term length: No fixed term
- Inaugural holder: Geronimo Z. Velasco
- Formation: 1978
- Website: http://www.doe.gov.ph

The Secretary of Energy (Filipino: Kalihim ng Enerhiya) is a member of the Cabinet of the Philippines in charge of the Department of Energy.

== Functions ==
According to the Department of Energy Act of 1992, the Secretary of Energy has the following functions:

- Establish policies and standards for the effective, efficient, and economical operation of the department in accordance with the programs of the government;
- Exercise direct supervision and control over all functions and activities of the department, as well as all its officers and personnel;
- Devise a program of international information on the geological and contractual conditions obtaining in the Philippines for oil and gas exploration to advance the industry.
- Create regional offices and such other service units and divisions as may be necessary;
- Create regional or separate grids as may be necessary or beneficial; and
- Perform such other functions as may be necessary or proper to attain the objectives of the Department of Energy Act of 1992.

== List of Secretaries of energy ==
=== Secretary of Energy (1977–1978) ===
Portrait	Name	Took office	Left office	President
	Geronimo Velasco	October 6, 1977	June 2, 1978	Ferdinand Marcos

=== Minister of Energy (1978–1986) ===
President Ferdinand Marcos issued Presidential Decree No. 1397 on June 2, 1978, converting all departments into ministries headed by ministers.

Portrait	Name	Took office	Left office	President
	Geronimo Velasco	June 2, 1978	February 25, 1986	Ferdinand Marcos
Vacant (February 25, 1986–January 30, 1987)				Corazon Aquino

=== Minister of Environment, Energy, and Natural Resources (1987) ===
President Corazon Aquino issued Executive Order No. 131 on January 30, 1987, merging the Ministry of Energy with the Ministry of Natural Resources to create the Ministry of Environment, Energy, and Natural Resources.

Portrait	Name	Took office	Left office	President
	Carlos Dominguez III (born 1945)	January 30, 1987	February 11, 1987	Corazon Aquino

=== Secretary of Environment, Energy, and Natural Resources (1987) ===
President Corazon Aquino issued Administrative Order No. 15 on February 11, 1987, converting all ministries into departments headed by secretaries.

Portrait	Name	Took office	Left office	President
	Carlos Dominguez III (born 1945)	February 11, 1987	March 9, 1987	Corazon Aquino
	Jun Factoran (1943–2020)	March 10, 1987	June 10, 1987	Corazon Aquino

=== Secretary of Energy (from 1992) ===
Portrait	Name	Took office	Left office	President
	Delfin Lazaro	January 12, 1993	September 19, 1994	Fidel V. Ramos
	Francisco Viray	September 20, 1994	June 30, 1998	Fidel V. Ramos
	Mario Tiaoqui	June 30, 1998	January 20, 2001	Joseph Estrada
	Jose Isidro Camacho (born 1955)	March 2, 2001	June 7, 2001	Gloria Macapagal Arroyo
	Vincent S. Perez (born 1958)	June 8, 2001	March 21, 2005	Gloria Macapagal Arroyo
	Raphael Lotilla (born 1958)	March 22, 2005	July 31, 2007	Gloria Macapagal Arroyo
	Angelo Reyes (1945−2011)	August 1, 2007	March 25, 2010	Gloria Macapagal Arroyo
	Jose Ibazeta; Acting	March 31, 2010	June 30, 2010	Gloria Macapagal Arroyo
	Rene Almendras (born 1960)	June 30, 2010	November 4, 2012	Benigno Aquino III
	Jericho Petilla (born 1963)	November 5, 2012	April 30, 2015	Benigno Aquino III
	Zenaida Monsada (Note: Zenaida Monsada served in an acting capacity from May 1 until July 1, 2015.)	May 1, 2015	July 1, 2015	Benigno Aquino III
	Zenaida Monsada	July 2, 2015	June 30, 2016	Benigno Aquino III
	Alfonso Cusi (born 1949)	June 30, 2016	June 30, 2022	Rodrigo Duterte
	Raphael Lotilla (born 1958)	July 11, 2022	May 22, 2025	Bongbong Marcos
	Sharon Garin	May 23, 2025	Incumbent	Bongbong Marcos
