= Sharon Garin =

Filipino politician

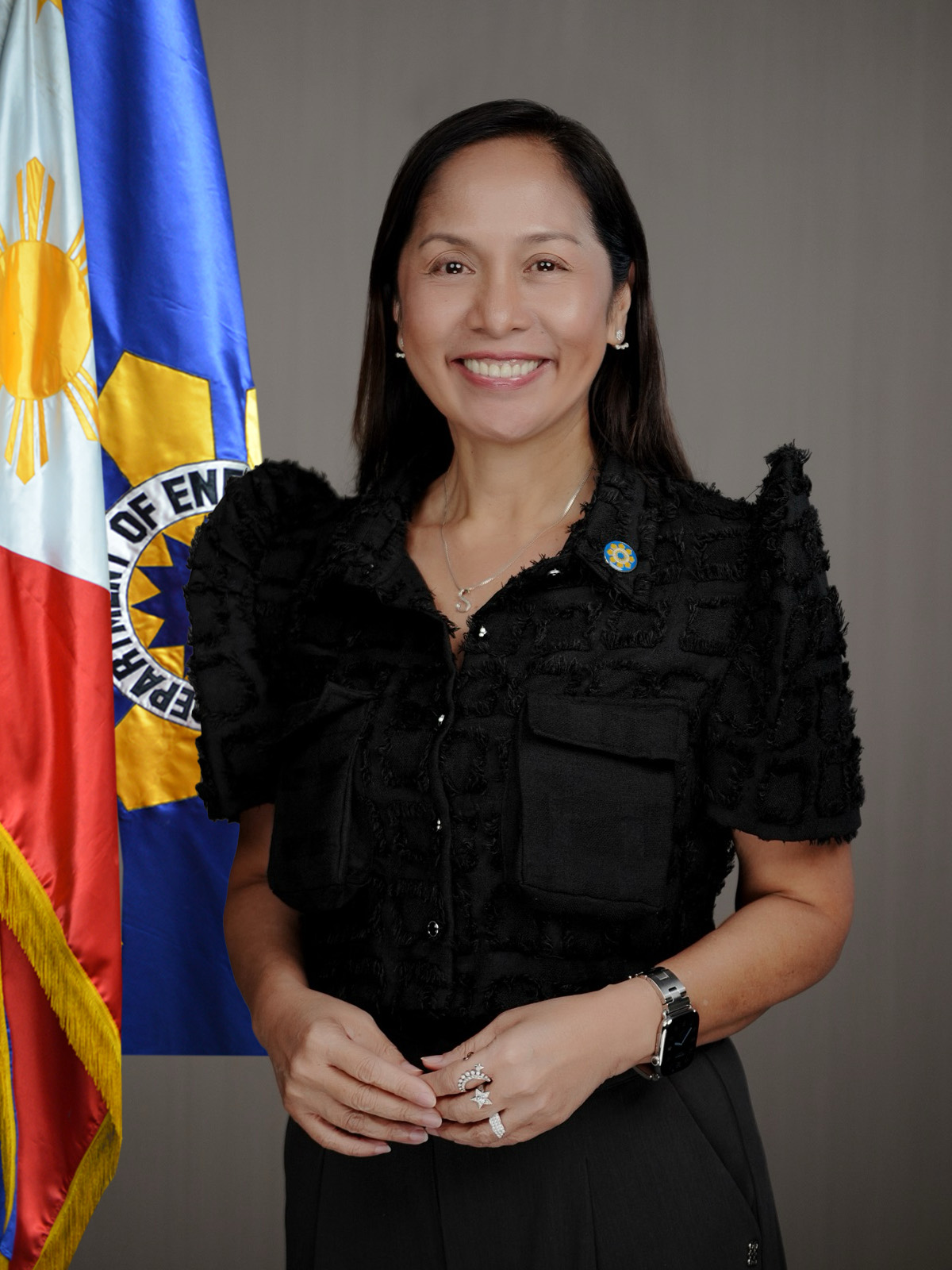
- Official portrait, 2025

14th Secretary of Energy
- Incumbent
- Assumed office July 10, 2025 (Note: Served as officer-in-charge of the Department of Energy from May 23, 2025 to July 10, 2025.)
- President: Bongbong Marcos
- Preceded by: Raphael Lotilla

Undersecretary in the Department of Energy
- In office September 16, 2022 – May 23, 2025

Deputy Speaker of the House of Representatives of the Philippines
- In office August 15, 2016 – June 30, 2019
- House Speaker: Pantaleon Alvarez; Gloria Macapagal Arroyo

Member of the Philippine House of Representatives for AAMBIS-Owa Party List
- In office September 26, 2010 – June 30, 2022

Personal details
- Born: Sharon Serag Garin; May 5, 1971 (age 55)
- Party: AAMBIS-Owa Party List
- Parents: Oscar Garin Sr. (father); Ninfa Serag (mother)
- Relatives: Oscar "Richard" Garin Jr. (brother); Janette Garin (sister-in-law); Janette "Jennifer" Garin (sister); Christine Garin (sister)
- Education: University of the Philippines Visayas–Iloilo City (BS); Ateneo de Manila University (JD); ESADE Business School (MBA)
- Profession: Lawyer; accountant

Sharon Serag Garin (born May 5, 1971) is a Filipino lawyer and politician who has served as the secretary of energy since 2025. She previously served as an undersecretary in the Department of Energy from 2022 to 2025 and as the representative for the AAMBIS-Owa Party List from 2010 to 2022.

Born to a longtime political dynasty based in Iloilo's first district, Garin is an accountant and environmentalist who was first elected to the House of Representatives of the Philippines in 2010. During her tenure, she served as a deputy speaker from 2016 to 2019, and chaired the Philippine House Committee on Economic Affairs from 2019 to 2020 and again from 2021 to 2022. Her four consecutive terms in Congress have been criticized as a potential violation of the Constitution.

After leaving Congress, she joined the Department of Energy in 2022 as an undersecretary, during which she pursued efforts toward attaining nuclear power in the Philippines. In May 2025, President Bongbong Marcos appointed Garin as secretary of energy as an officer in charge as part of a major cabinet reshuffle before permanently appointing her to the position in July.

== Early life and career ==
Sharon Serag Garin was born on May 5, 1971 to politicians Oscar Garin Sr. (1941–2021), a civic leader and environmentalist, and Ninfa Serag Garin (born 1944). Her parents were the heads of a political dynasty that has dominated the politics of Iloilo's first district since 1987. She and her three siblings, Oscar Jr. ("Richard", born 1967), Janette ("Jennifer", born 1969), and Christine (born 1973), all became politicians.

Garin served as Sangguniang Kabataan (SK) president and, afterwards, councilor in the municipality of Guimbal, Iloilo in the 1990s.

== House of Representatives (2010–2022) ==
=== Elections ===
Garin was elected to the House of Representatives of the Philippines in 2010 as the first nominee of the AAMBIS-Owa Party List, which aims to represent Filipino farmers. The party went on to retain the seat in the 2013 and 2016 elections. Despite Garin being term-limited, the party renominated her in 2019. In the lead-up to the election, watchdog group Kontra Daya criticized her party and others for having "bastardized and corrupted" the party-list system by enabling political dynasties to flourish. Her party went on to win a seat in the election; while their certificate of proclamation was suspended, she was later allowed to sit as a member of the 18th Congress.

=== Tenure ===
As a representative, media outlets described Garin as a low-profile but seasoned member of the chamber. In 2017, Garin attracted media attention for bringing consultant Althea Acas to tears during a tense Ways and Means Committee hearing concerning the management of the Bureau of Customs. In 2020, she introduced a bill pushing for the mandatory donation of edible food surplus for charitable purposes and the creation of food banks to minimize food waste in the country.

On July 22, 2019, Garin was elected as the chairperson of the Philippine House Committee on Economic Affairs. With Garin being an ally of Lord Allan Velasco, Speaker Alan Peter Cayetano ousted her from the position on October 6, 2020, amid a leadership challenge from Velasco. In response to her removal, Garin criticized Speaker Cayetano for having "no honor" and accused him of excessive political maneuvering. She further criticized the subsequent election of Teodorico Haresco Jr., who was not a party-list representative, as her successor as the chairperson of her committee.

On May 18, 2021, Garin was returned to her role as chairperson of the Philippine House Committee on Economic Affairs.

== Undersecretary of Energy (2022–2025) ==
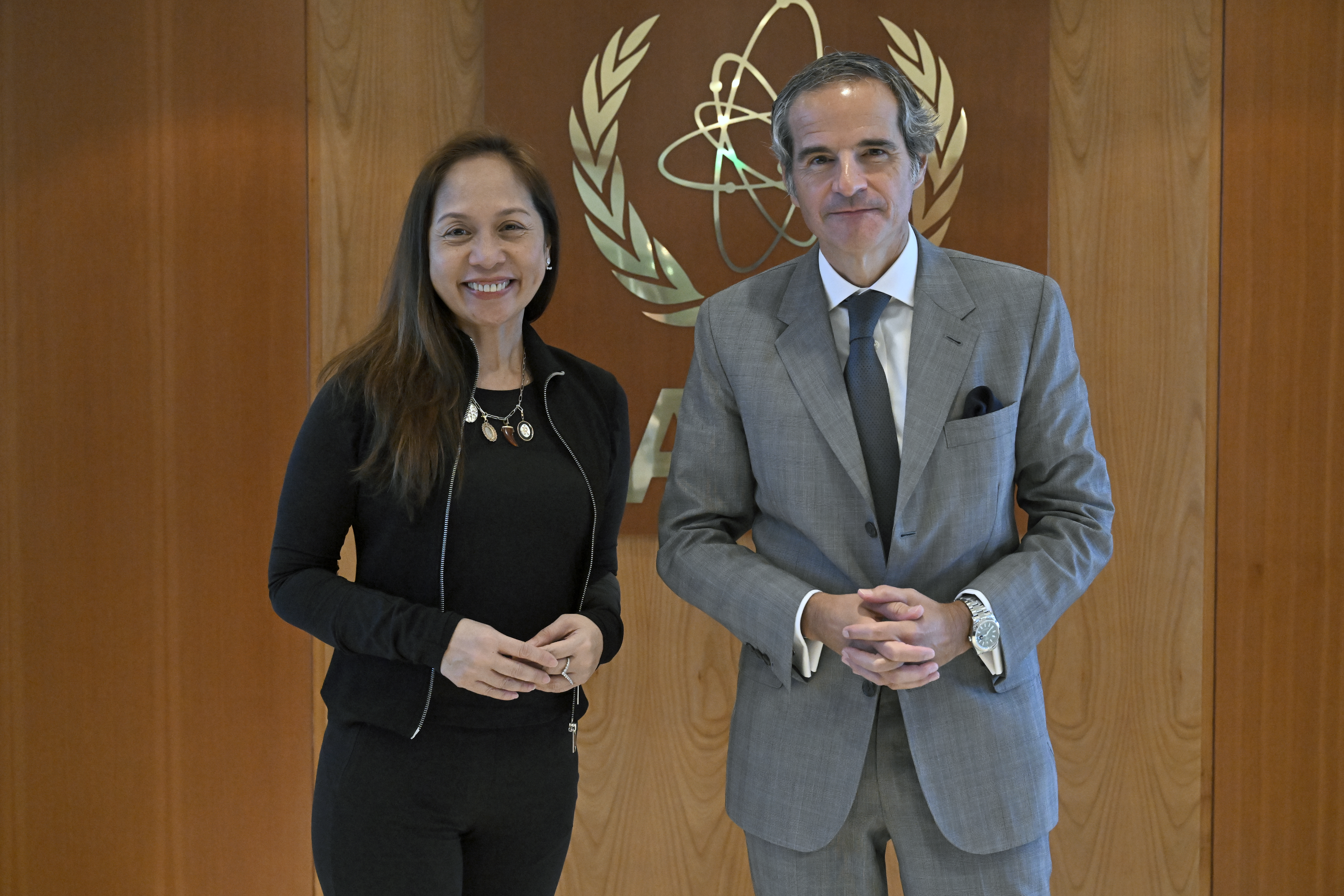
Garin with IAEA director general Rafael Grossi in Vienna in September 2024

On September 16, 2022, Energy Secretary Raphael Lotilla appointed Garin as an undersecretary in the Department of Energy.

During her tenure, she oversaw the Financial Services managed the Legal Services, supervised the Nuclear Energy Program Interagency Committee, and served as the Department Legislative Liaison Officer. She has been instrumental in improving the department's financial stability and operational effectiveness through enhanced budgeting and accounting operations. She has advocated for revising the omnibus guidelines for awarding renewable energy service contracts, aiming to streamline the process for project proponents. Her focus has been on allowing developers to concentrate on project construction without being impeded by administrative obstacles.

During the 68th Regular Session of the International Atomic Energy Agency, Garin announced the department's goal of establishing commercially operational nuclear power plants by 2032, aiming to contribute to the country's power supply.

== Secretary of Energy (since 2025) ==
=== Appointment ===
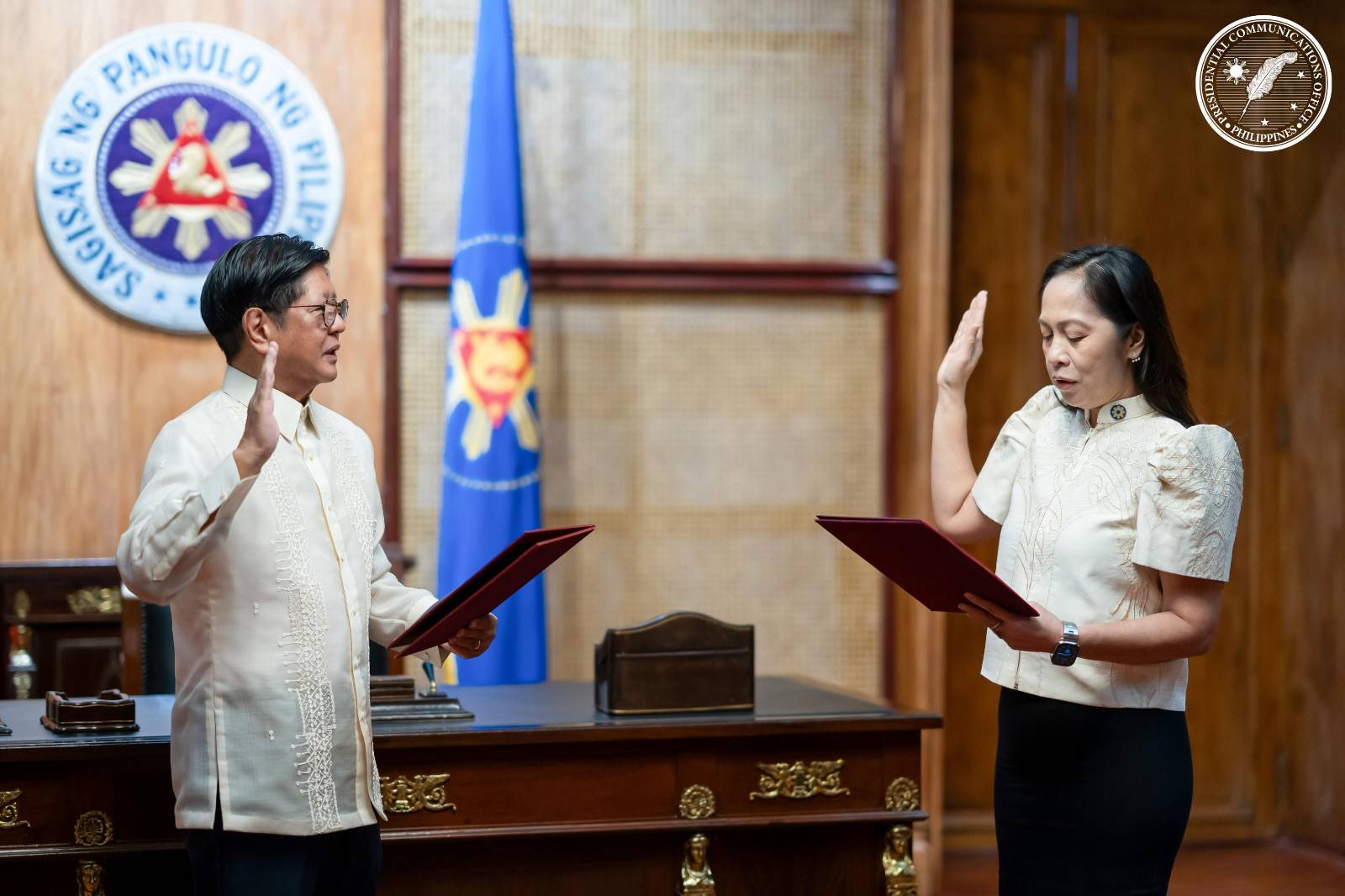
Garin (right) takes her oath as the 14th secretary of energy before President Bongbong Marcos (left) on July 14, 2025

On May 23, 2025, President Bongbong Marcos appointed Garin as secretary of energy as an officer in charge, having reassigned Secretary Raphael Lotilla to the Department of Environment and Natural Resources during a major cabinet reshuffle. Key power distributor Meralco welcomed Garin's interim appointment to the role, owing to her support for nuclear energy and her role "on top of the nuclear agenda".

On July 10, President Marcos appointed Garin to the role on a permanent capacity.

On October 1, the Commission on Appointments confirmed Garin's appointment as energy secretary.

=== Tenure ===
Garin was sworn in as secretary on July 14, 2025. Following her formal installation, she affirmed that her tenure would largely be a continuation of the Lotilla secretariat.

== Notes ==
Political offices
Preceded by Raphael Lotilla	Secretary of Energy; 2025–present	Incumbent
Order of precedence
Preceded by Rolando Toledo as Acting Secretary of Budget and Management	Order of Precedence of the Philippines as Secretary of Energy	Succeeded by Henry Aguda as Secretary of Information and Communications Technology
