= Toni Yulo-Loyzaga =

Filipina government official

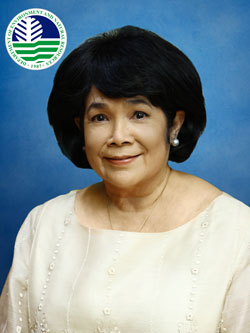
- Official portrait, 2022

33rd Secretary of Environment and Natural Resources
- In office July 19, 2022 – May 22, 2025
- President: Bongbong Marcos
- Preceded by: Ernesto Adobo Jr. (OIC)
- Succeeded by: Raphael P.M. Lotilla

Special Envoy for Disaster Risk Reduction and Management
- Incumbent
- Assumed office March 18, 2026

Personal details
- Born: Maria Antonia Jugo Yulo
- Spouse: Chito Loyzaga
- Parents: Luis Yulo y Araneta (father); Teresa Jugo y Rodríguez (mother)
- Relatives: Jose Yulo (grandfather)
- Education: Ateneo de Manila University (BA); Georgetown University (MA)
- Nickname(s): Maritoni; Toni

Maria Antonia Yulo de Loyzaga is a Filipina government official who previously served as secretary of environment and natural resources from 2022 to 2025.

== Early life and education ==
She attended the Ateneo de Manila University and gained a Bachelor of Arts in Political Science then went to Georgetown University in Washington D.C. where she obtained a master's degree in government, international relations.

== Career ==
=== Earlier roles ===
Yulo-Loyzaga served the chairperson of the International Advisory Board of the Manila Observatory from 2007 until 2016. She was also a technical advisor for the Philippine Disaster Resilience Foundation and a member of the Senior Advisory Board of the Armed Forces of the Philippines' Command and General Staff College chairperson where she worked to advance more scientific research on climate and disaster resilience.

=== Environment secretary ===
Yulo-Loyzaga was appointed by President Bongbong Marcos, to whom she is related, as the Secretary of the Department of Environment and Natural Resources. She took oath as environment secretary on July 19, 2022. Her office is assisted by her son, Jose Joaquin Yulo-Loyzaga, who serves as Head Executive Assistant to the Secretary.

Among the issues she tackled on her first year is the MT Princess Empress oil spill in February 2023. Local officials noted her absence on site at the disaster response effort. Despite the Masungi Georeserve Foundation Inc.'s (MGFI) endorsement of Yulo-Loyzaga's appointment as environment secretary, the DENR has announced plans to cancel its 2017 agreement with the organization related to the conservation of the Masungi Georeserve.

In early 2023, anti-mining advocates in Sibuyan Island has protested' Altai Philippines Mining Corporation (APMC) continued nickel mining. They criticized Yulo-Loyzaga's inaction against the operations.

Senator Tulfo has flagged Yulo-Loyzaga's "excessive foreign travel," alleging that DENR's travel budget had ballooned to P1.1 billion. Tulfo further claimed that Yulo-Loyzaga had taken 13 to 14 foreign trips in a single year, accusing her of using her diplomatic passport to classify personal travel as official government business. However, the DENR defended Yulo-Loyzaga's international engagements, stating that her trips were essential to secure international funding and support for environmental programs. The DENR clarified that Yulo-Loyzaga had taken only six official trips during the year, emphasizing their necessity for climate and environmental policy negotiations.

Yulo-Loyzaga has been ranked as one of the lowest-performing cabinet members in a nationwide poll conducted by the RP-Mission and Development Foundation (RPMD) in early 2024 placed her as the lowest surveyed department heads in President Marcos' cabinet, with an approval rating of 46%. A subsequent survey in mid-2024 reaffirmed this ranking, with Yulo-Loyzaga's approval rating increasing slightly to 50%.

On dealing with the Chocolate Hills resort controversy of 2024, Yulo-Loyzaga initially penalized Captain's Peak Garden and Resort which was built illegally at the foot of the Chocolate Hills in Bohol. Senators in an inquiry has urged for the immediate demolition of the resort which stands on a protected area. Yulo-Loyzaga has question the municipal government of Sagbayan for giving a building permit to the resort owners despite the lack of an environmental compliance certificate (ECC).

Senator Raffy Tulfo has alleged Yulo-Loyzaga has a conflict of interest due to her clan alleged ownership of 40,000-hectare (99,000-acre) Yulo King Ranch spanning Coron and Busuanga in Palawan. The estate was alleged to be obtained by the Yulo family in 1976 despite the area being declared a pasture reserve – a protected area via Presidential Proclamation No. 1387 issued by former president Ferdinand Marcos Sr. in 1975.

The Pambansang Lakas ng Kilusang Mamamalakaya ng Pilipinas (Pamalakaya) says that Yulo-Loyzaga has made no efforts to stop land reclamation projects in the Manila Bay despite its alleged adverse environmental impact. A DENR assessment on the impact of the projects on the environment and livelihood is yet to be released publicly as of February 2025.

On May 22, 2025, President Marcos ordered members of his cabinet to tender their courtesy resignations in the aftermath of the May 12, 2025 midterm elections. Her resignation was accepted. Executive secretary Lucas Bersamin said that the evaluation concludes she must "rest for a while" and noted that there was "a perception that she was frequently abroad".

Special Envoy for Disaster Risk Reduction and Management

On March 18, 2026, Yulo-Loyzaga was appointed by President Marcos as Special Envoy for Disaster Risk Reduction and Management.

== Personal life ==
Yulo-Loyzaga is married to former professional basketball player Chito Loyzaga, with whom she has three children, two daughters and a son. Yulo-Loyzaga is a relative of First lady Liza Araneta-Marcos.

Political offices
Preceded by Ernesto Adobo Jr. (OIC)	Secretary of Environment and Natural Resources; 2022–2025	Succeeded by Raphael P.M. Lotilla; Ad interim
