= Department of Energy (Philippines) =

Executive department of the Philippine government

- Kagawaran ng Enerhiya
- Seal of the department

Department overview
- Formed: January 11, 1993; 33 years ago
- Headquarters: Energy Center, Rizal Drive, Bonifacio Global City, Taguig
- Employees: 1200
- Annual budget: ₱2.37 billion (2026)
- Department executive: Sharon Garin, Secretary
- Website: www.doe.gov.ph

The Department of Energy (DOE; Filipino: Kagawaran ng Enerhiya) is the executive department of the Philippine government responsible for preparing, integrating, manipulating, organizing, coordinating, supervising, and controlling all plans, programs, projects and activities of the Government relative to energy exploration, development, utilization, distribution and conservation.

== History ==
The Department of Energy was created by then-president Ferdinand Marcos as he issued Presidential Decree No. 1206 which created the Ministry of Energy and attached the National Power Corporation and the Philippine National Oil Company to this new agency. The ministry and its two bureaus (Bureau of Energy Development and Bureau of Energy Utilization) remained intact but was downgraded into a mere Office of Energy Affairs—headed by Wenceslao de la Paz and reporting to then Deputy Executive Secretary for Energy Catalino Macaraig, Jr. based in Malacañang—during the administration of President Corazon Aquino. During the presidency of Fidel V. Ramos, the department was created due to Republic Act No. 7638 otherwise known as the Department of Energy Act of 1992.

The department was vested additional powers and functions under Republic Act No. (RA) 8479 or the "Downstream Oil Deregulation Act of 1997", RA 9136 or the "Electric Power Industry Reform Act of 2001", RA 9367 or "Biofuels Act of 2006", RA 9513 or "Renewable Energy Act of 2008, RA 11234 or "Energy Virtual One Stop Shop Act", RA 11285 or "Energy Efficiency and Conservation Act", RA 11592 or "LPG Industry Regulation Act", RA 11646 or "Microgrid Systems Act", RA 11697 or "Electric Vehicle Industry Development Act”, and RA 12120 or “ Philippine Natural Gas Industry Development Act.”

== Organization ==
The department is headed by the Secretary of Energy who is assisted by eight Undersecretaries and five Assistant Secretaries. Under the department are the Administrative Service, Financial Service, Information Technology and Management Service, Legal Service and Energy Research Testing and Laboratory Service. In place of regional offices, the department has field offices for Luzon in Rosales, Pangasinan, Visayas in Cebu City, and Mindanao in Davao City.

== List of secretaries of energy ==
| Bureau | Acronym | Incumbent |
|---|---|---|
| Electric Power Industry Management Bureau | EPIMB | Luningning G. Baltazar |
| Energy Policy and Planning Bureau | EPPB | Michael O. Sinocruz |
| Energy Resources Development Bureau | ERDB | Demujin F. Antiporda |
| Energy Utilization Management Bureau | EUMB | Patrick T. Aquino, CESO III |
| Oil Industry Management Bureau | OIMB | Rino E. Abad |
| Renewable Energy Management Bureau | REMB | Marissa P. Cerezo |

On June 1, 2024, the DOE created the Nuclear Energy Division under its Director Patrick T. Aquino, CESO III. The new division is attached under the Energy Utilization Management Bureau and will report to (then) Energy Undersecretary Sharon Garin. It will coordinate with the Philippine Nuclear Research Institute. It originated from Executive Orders No. 116, EO No. 164 (2022) and House Resolution No. 134 (2023).

== Attached agencies ==
| Agency | Acronym | Incumbent |
|---|---|---|
| National Biofuels Board | NBB | Sharon S. Garin (ex-oficio) |
| National Power Corporation | NAPOCOR/NPC | Jericho Jonas B. Nograles |
| National Transmission Corporation | TransCo | Joseph Omar A. Castillo |
| National Electrification Administration | NEA | Antonio Mariano C. Almeda |
| Philippine National Oil Company | PNOC | Franz Josef George E. Alvarez |
| PNOC Exploration Corporation | PNOC EC | Adrian Ferdinand S. Sugay |
| Power Sector Assets and Liabilities Management Corporation | PSALM | Dennis Edward A. Dela Serna |

== See also ==
- U.S. Department of Energy
- Department of Energy (United Kingdom)
