= List of female cabinet secretaries of the Philippines =

denotes the first female secretary of that particular department.

Secretary	Position	Year appointed	Administration
Government
Corazon Aquino	President of the Philippines	1986	Herself
Gloria Macapagal Arroyo	President of the Philippines	2001	Herself
Gloria Macapagal Arroyo	Vice President of the Philippines	1998	Joseph Estrada
Leni Robredo	Vice President of the Philippines	2016	Rodrigo Duterte
Sara Duterte	Vice President of the Philippines	2022	Bongbong Marcos
Secretary of Agrarian Reform
Miriam Defensor Santiago	Secretary of Agrarian Reform	1989	Corazon Aquino
Rosalina Bistoyong	Secretary of Agrarian Reform	2017	Rodrigo Duterte
Secretary of Budget and Management
Emilia Boncodin	Secretary of Budget and Management	1998	Fidel Ramos
Emilia Boncodin	Secretary of Budget and Management	2001	Gloria Macapagal Arroyo
Janet Abuel	Secretary of Budget and Management	2019	Rodrigo Duterte
Tina Rose Marie Canda	Secretary of Budget and Management	2021	Rodrigo Duterte
Amenah Pangandaman	Secretary of Budget and Management	2022	Bongbong Marcos
Secretary of Education
Lourdes Quisumbing	Secretary of Education, Culture and Sports	1986	Corazon Aquino
Erlinda C. Perifanco	Secretary of Education, Culture and Sports	1998	Fidel Ramos
Fe Hidalgo	Secretary of Education	2005	Gloria Macapagal Arroyo
Mona Valisno	Secretary of Education	2010	Gloria Macapagal Arroyo
Leonor Briones	Secretary of Education	2016	Rodrigo Duterte
Sara Duterte	Secretary of Education	2022	Bongbong Marcos
Secretary of Energy
Zenaida Monsada	Secretary of Energy	2015	Benigno Aquino III
Sharon Garin	Secretary of Energy	2025	Bongbong Marcos
Secretary of Environment and Natural Resources
Elisea G. Gozun	Secretary of Environment and Natural Resources	2002	Gloria Macapagal Arroyo
Gina Lopez	Secretary of Environment and Natural Resources	2016	Rodrigo Duterte
Maria Antonia Yulo-Loyzaga	Secretary of Environment and Natural Resources	2022	Bongbong Marcos
Secretary of Finance
Juanita Amatong	Secretary of Finance	2003	Gloria Macapagal Arroyo
Secretary of Foreign Affairs
Gloria Macapagal Arroyo	Secretary of Foreign Affairs	2002	Herself
Gloria Macapagal Arroyo	Secretary of Foreign Affairs	2003	Herself
Delia Domingo Albert	Secretary of Foreign Affairs	2003	Gloria Macapagal Arroyo
Tess Lazaro	Secretary of Foreign Affairs	2025	Bongbong Marcos
Secretary of Health
Carmencita Reodica	Secretary of Health	1996	Fidel Ramos
Dr. Esperanza Cabral	Secretary of Health	2009	Gloria Macapagal Arroyo
Dr. Janette Garin	Secretary of Health	2014	Benigno Aquino III
Dr. Paulyn Ubial	Secretary of Health	2016	Rodrigo Duterte
Dr. Maria Rosario Singh-Vergeire	Officer-in-Charge	2022	Bongbong Marcos
Secretary of Human Settlements and Urban Development
Melissa Aradanas	Officer-in-Charge	2022	Bongbong Marcos
Secretary of Justice
Merceditas Gutierrez	Secretary of Justice	2002	Gloria Macapagal Arroyo
Agnes Devanadera	Secretary of Justice	2007	Gloria Macapagal Arroyo
Leila de Lima	Secretary of Justice	2010	Benigno Aquino III
Secretary of Labor and Employment
Nieves Confesor	Secretary of Labor and Employment	1992	Fidel Ramos
Patricia Sto. Tomas	Secretary of Labor and Employment	2001	Gloria Macapagal Arroyo
Rosalinda Baldoz	Secretary of Labor and Employment	2010	Benigno Aquino III
Secretary of Migrant Workers
Susan Ople	Secretary of Migrant Workers	2022	Bongbong Marcos
Secretary of National Defense
Gloria Macapagal Arroyo	Secretary of National Defense	2003	Herself
Gloria Macapagal Arroyo	Secretary of National Defense	2006	Herself
Secretary of Science and Technology
Estrella F. Alabastro	Secretary of Science and Technology	2001	Gloria Macapagal Arroyo
Secretary of Social Welfare and Development
Asuncion A. Perez	Secretary of Social Welfare	1946	Manuel Roxas
Pacita Madrigal-Warns	Secretary of Social Welfare	1954	Ramon Magsaysay
Amparo Villamor	Secretary of Social Welfare	1960	Carlos P. Garcia
Tecla San Andres Ziga	Secretary of Social Welfare	1962	Diosdado Macapagal
Estefania Aldaba-Lim	Secretary of Social Welfare	1971	Ferdinand Marcos
Sylvia P. Montes	Minister of Social Services and Development	1978	Ferdinand Marcos
Dr. Mita Pardo de Tavera	Minister/Secretary of Social Welfare and Development	1986	Corazon Aquino
Corazon Alma C. de Leon	Secretary of Social Welfare and Development	1992	Fidel Ramos
Lilian Laigo	Secretary of Social Welfare and Development	1995	Fidel Ramos
Gloria Macapagal Arroyo	Secretary of Social Welfare and Development	1998	Joseph Estrada
Dulce Saguisag	Secretary of Social Welfare and Development	2000	Joseph Estrada
Corazon Julian N. Soliman	Secretary of Social Welfare and Development	2001	Gloria Macapagal Arroyo
Luwalhati Pablo	Secretary of Social Welfare and Development	2005	Gloria Macapagal Arroyo
Dr. Esperanza Cabral	Secretary of Social Welfare and Development	2005	Gloria Macapagal Arroyo
Celia Yangco	Secretary of Social Welfare and Development	2009	Gloria Macapagal Arroyo
Corazon Julian N. Soliman	Secretary of Social Welfare and Development	2010	Benigno Aquino III
Judy Taguiwalo	Secretary of Social Welfare and Development	2016	Rodrigo Duterte
Virginia Orogo	Secretary of Social Welfare and Development	2018	Rodrigo Duterte
Secretary of Tourism
Narzalina Lim	Secretary of Tourism	1989	Corazon Aquino
Evelyn B. Pantig	Secretary of Tourism	1996	Fidel Ramos
Mina Gabor	Secretary of Tourism	1996	Fidel Ramos
Gemma Teresa Guerrero Cruz Araneta	Secretary of Tourism	1998	Joseph Estrada
Wanda Corazon Teo	Secretary of Tourism	2016	Rodrigo Duterte
Bernadette Romulo-Puyat	Secretary of Tourism	2018	Rodrigo Duterte
Christina Frasco	Secretary of Tourism	2022	Bongbong Marcos
Verna Buensuceso	Officer-in-Charge	2026	Bongbong Marcos
Dita Angara-Mathay	Secretary of Tourism	2026	Bongbong Marcos
Secretary of Trade and Industry
Lilia Bautista	Secretary of Trade and Industry	1992	Corazon Aquino
Cristina Aldeguer-Roque	Secretary of Trade and Industry	2024	Bongbong Marcos
Secretary of Transportation and Communications
Josefina Trinidad-Luchauco	Secretary of Transportation and Communications	1998	Fidel Ramos
Anneli Lontoc	Secretary of Transportation and Communications	2010	Gloria Macapagal Arroyo
Presidential Spokesperson
Anabella T. Abaya	Presidential Spokesperson	1992	Fidel Ramos
Executive Secretary
Luz Cleta Reyes-Bakunawa	Executive Secretary	1987	Corazon Aquino
Chairman of the Commission on Higher Education
Patricia Licuanan	Chairman of the Commission on Higher Education	2010	Benigno Aquino III
Presidential Management Staff
Ma. Leonora Vasquez-de Jesus, Ph.D.	Chief of the Presidential Management Staff	1992	Fidel Ramos
Ma. Leonora Vasquez-de Jesus, Ph.D.	Chief of the Presidential Management Staff	1998	Joseph Estrada
Julia Abad	Chief of the Presidential Management Staff	2010	Benigno Aquino III
Zenaida Angping	Chief of the Presidential Management Staff	2022	Bongbong Marcos
Cabinet Secretary
Ma. Leonora Vasquez-de Jesus, Ph.D.	Cabinet Secretary	1992	Fidel Ramos
Ma. Leonora Vasquez-de Jesus, Ph.D.	Cabinet Secretary	1998	Joseph Estrada
Secretary of the Presidential Communications Operations Office
Trixie Cruz-Angeles	Press Secretary	2022	Bongbong Marcos
Cheloy Garafil	Press Secretary/Secretary of the Presidential Communications Office	2022	Bongbong Marcos
Housing and Urban Development Coordinating Council
Imelda Romualdez Marcos	Minister of Human Settlements	1978	Ferdinand Marcos
Ma. Leonora Vasquez-de Jesus, Ph.D.	Chairman of the Housing and Urban Development Coordinating Council	2000	Joseph Estrada
Leni Robredo	Chairman of the Housing and Urban Development Coordinating Council	2016	Rodrigo Duterte
Secretary of Socio-economic Planning/Director General of National Economic and Development Authority
Solita Collas-Monsod	Director General of National Economic and Development Authority and Minister/Secretary of Economic Planning	1986	Corazon Aquino
National Security Adviser
Clarita Carlos	National Security Adviser	2022	Bongbong Marcos

== See also ==
- Cabinet
- Cabinet of the Philippines
- Politics of the Philippines
