= Ždánice =

Ždánice may refer to places in the Czech Republic:

- Ždánice (Hodonín District), a town in the South Moravian Region
  - Ždánice Forest, a mountain range named after the town
- Ždánice (Kolín District), a municipality and village in the Central Bohemian Region
- Ždánice (Žďár nad Sázavou District), a municipality and village in the Vysočina Region
- Ždánice, a village and part of Vilémov (Havlíčkův Brod District) in the Vysočina Region
- Staré Ždánice, a municipality and village in the Pardubice Region
