= Manila Memorial Park – Sucat =

Private cemetery in Parañaque, Philippines

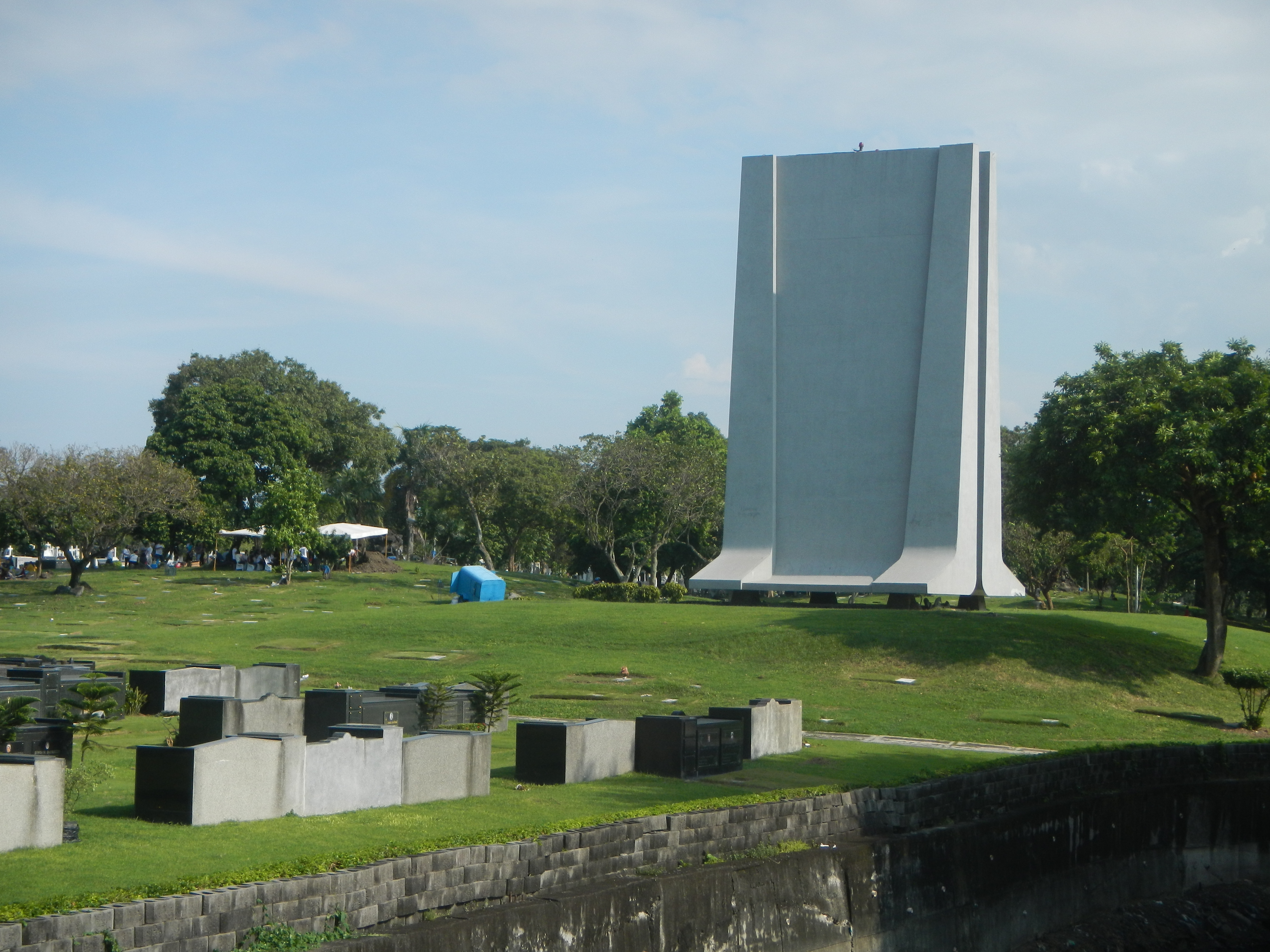
- The Meditation Tower within the cemetery grounds
- Interactive map of Manila Memorial Park – Sucat

Details
- Established: 1964
- Location: Parañaque, Metro Manila
- Country: Philippines
- Coordinates: 14°27′17″N 121°01′28″E
- Type: Public
- Owned by: Manila Memorial Park, Inc.
- Website: www.manilamemorial.com

The Manila Memorial Park – Sucat (MMP–Sucat) is a cemetery situated along Dr. A. Santos Avenue (Sucat Road) in Barangay BF Homes, Parañaque, Metro Manila, Philippines.

Rizal Premier Chapel

== History ==
The Manila Memorial Park in Parañaque was established in 1964, when the city was still a municipality of Rizal province. In August 1985, it became the first cemetery to host a modern crematorium in a memorial park setting, having been established a year after Pope Paul VI lifted the ban on cremation for Catholics. The cemetery became part of a larger network of burial sites of Manila Memorial Park, Inc. with five other cemeteries under the Manila Memorial Park brand opened in other parts of the Philippines.

From December 2016 to August 2017, the Rizal Premier Chapel, a new funeral venue was built. The cemetery hosts a second older chapel.

The Manila Memorial Park was the plot setting in the drama film Yesterday, Today, Tomorrow in 2011.

== Notable burials ==
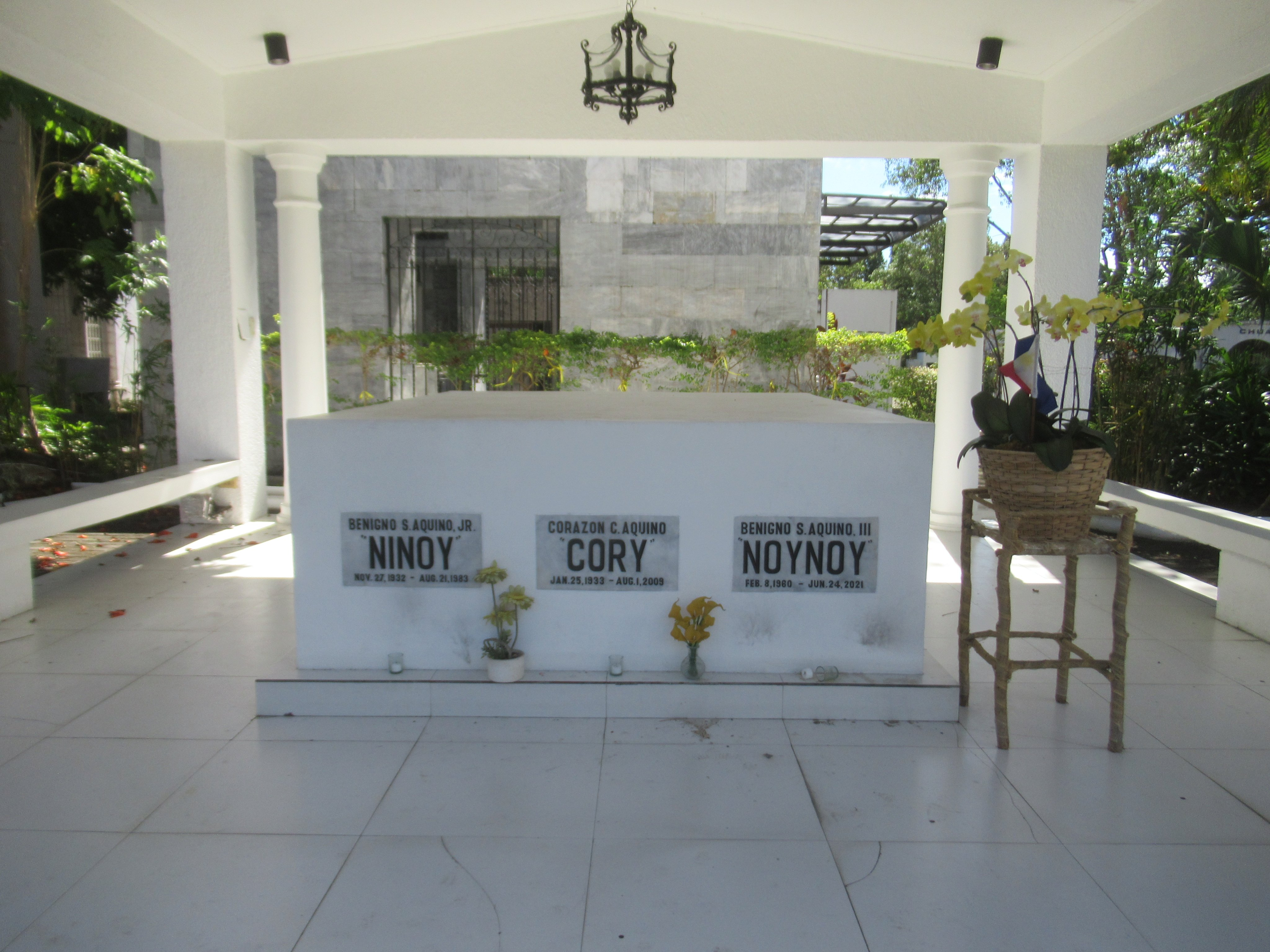
Burial site of 11th President Corazon Aquino, former Senator Benigno Aquino Jr., and 15th President Benigno Aquino III.

The Manila Memorial Park is the site of burial of several Filipino notable individuals which includes politicians, actors, and athletes.

- Jum Jainudin Akbar (1963–2016), former governor of Basilan
- Alfie Anido (1959–1981), actor
- Nereo Andolong (1926–2001), former chairman and general manager of the Philippine Charity Sweepstakes Office and president of Philippine Olympic Committee
- Pablo Antonio (1901–1975), National Artist for Architecture
- Jun Aristorenas (1933–2000), actor and director
- Norma Marco (1947–2024), radio personality (DZMM)
- Rey Cuenco (1962–1996), basketball player
- Benigno Aquino Jr. (1932–1983), senator of the Philippines
- Corazon Aquino (1933–2009), 11th president of the Philippines
- Benigno Aquino III (1960–2021), 15th president of the Philippines
- Clare R. Baltazar (1927–2024), National Scientist of the Philippines for Systematic Entomology
- Robert Barbers (1944–2005), senator of the Philippines
- Roberto Benedicto (1917–2000), former ambassador
- Ely Ramos (1911–1972), Pre-war actor
- Lourdes Carvajal (1944–2003), radio/TV host and journalist
- Bayani Casimiro, Sr. (1918–1989), dancer and actor
- Mariano Contreras (1910–1978), comedian
- Dakila Cua (1977-2026) Governor of Quirino
- Pablo Cuneta (1910–2000), mayor of Pasay
- Paquito Diaz (1932–2011), actor and director
- Gabriel Elorde (1935–1985), professional boxer
- John Gokongwei, Jr. (1926–2019), businessman
- Maita Gomez (1947–2012), beauty queen and women's rights advocate
- Arsenio Laurel (1931–1967), race car driver
- Sotero Laurel (1918–2009), senator of the Philippines
- Cesar Legaspi (1917–1994), National Artist for Visual Arts. His remains were exhumed from the Libingan ng mga Bayani. The Legaspi Family decided to transfer his remains in protest of the burial of Ferdinand Marcos
- Pilar Hidalgo-Lim (1893–1973), one of the founders of Girl Scouts of the Philippines. A cenotaph for her husband Vicente Lim is placed on her grave plot.
- Maria Clara Lobregat (1921–2004), mayor of Zamboanga City
- Eugenio Lopez Jr. (1928–1999), chairman of ABS-CBN Corporation
- Gina Lopez (1953–2019), secretary of Department of Environment and Natural Resources
- Ike Lozada (1940–1995), comedian
- Anita Linda (1924–2020), actress
- Percival Mabasa (1959–2022), radio broadcaster and journalist
- Diomedes Maturan (1940–2002), singer
- Leandro Mendoza (1946–2013), secretary of Transportation and chief of the Philippine National Police
- Pitoy Moreno (1925–2018), fashion designer
- Tita Muñoz (1927–2009), actress
- Ronnie Nathanielsz (1935–2016), sports journalist
- Fred Panopio (1939–2010), singer
- AJ Perez (1993–2011), actor
- Eddie Peregrina (1944–1977), singer
- Kerima Polotan–Tuvera (1925–2011), journalist
- Orly Punzalan (1935–2005), radio/TV host and news anchor
- Pocholo Ramirez (1933–2009), racing driver
- Narciso Ramos (1900–1986), minister of Foreign Affairs
- Leticia Ramos–Shahani (1929–2017), senator of the Philippines
- John Regala (1967–2023), actor
- Rene Requiestas (1957–1993), actor and comedian (reinterred at Cainta Public Cemetery)
- Miguel Rodriguez (1962–1997), actor; his remains were later transferred at Alabang Church Columbarium
- Dulce Saguisag (1943–2007), former secretary of Social Welfare and Development
- Rene Saguisag (1939 – 2024), human rights lawyer and former senator
- Jam Sebastian, (1986–2015), actor and internet personality
- Roy Señeres (1947–2016), politician and 2016 presidential candidate
- Rosario Silayan-Bailon (1959–2006), beauty queen and actress
- Vic Silayan (1929–1987), actor
- Charito Solis (1935–1998), actress
- Helen Vela (1946–1992), actress and radio/TV host and news anchor
- Nestor de Villa (1928–2004), actor
- Luis Villafuerte, Sr. (1935–2021), Governor of Camarines Sur
- Lauro Vizconde (1947–2016), chairman emeritus of Volunteers Against Crime and Corruption (VACC); buried along his family who were killed in the Vizconde massacre in 1991, namely: his wife Estrelita (born in 1949), and daughters Carmela (born in 1971) and Anna Marie Jennifer (born in 1982).
- Manuel Yan (1920–2008), World War II veteran, former AFP Chief of Staff and Secretary of Foreign Affairs
- Rico Yan (1975–2002), actor
- Emilio Yap (1925–2014), businessman and philanthropist
- Alfonso Yuchengco (1923–2017), businessman
