= Karel Styblo =

Czech-Dutch medical doctor (1921–1998)

Karel Styblo

Karel Styblo (26 November 1921 – 13 March 1998) was a Czech-Dutch medical doctor. Internationally recognized for his work with tuberculosis (TB), he was a medical advisor to the Royal Netherlands Tuberculosis Association, and was named director of the International Union Against Tuberculosis and Lung Disease (IUATLD) in 1979. He is known as the "father of modern TB epidemiology" and the "father of modern TB control".

== Personal life ==
Styblo was born in Vilémov in Czechoslovakia on 26 November 1921. Toward the end of World War II, he was imprisoned at the Mauthausen-Gusen concentration camp in Austria, where he contracted tuberculosis. After his recovery and release, Styblo entered Charles University in Prague. Obituaries say Styblo studied under Sir John Crofton at the University of Edinburgh, Scotland in the 1950s; the IUATLD says Crofton and Styblo worked together in Edinburgh in the early 50s. Crofton said in an interview that they met in 1960 while Styblo was still in Czechoslovakia.

Styblo moved to the Netherlands after the unsuccessful Prague Spring, and became a Dutch citizen in 1971. He was still active when he died suddenly in The Hague on 13 March 1998 at the age of 76; his wife, Lida, predeceased him.

== Career ==
Styblo's life's work was to develop, pioneer, and demonstrate the "proof of principle" for the strategy used to control TB by the World Bank and promulgated by the World Health Organization (WHO). Called Directly Observed Therapy – Short Course (DOTS), the TB therapy revolutionized the fight to control TB throughout the world. DOTS has been employed by 187 of the 193 members of WHO as of 2008. Styblo applied this methodology to the national TB control programs of Tanzania, Benin, Malawi, Mozambique, Nicaragua, and China; DOTS has been described as the "most effective means of controlling the current tuberculosis epidemic" and had been applied in over 90 countries as of 2001.

Styblo was responsible for a guiding epidemiological rule of thumb for TB known as "Styblo's rule", which stated that "an annual incidence of 50 sputum-smear-positive TB cases in a population of 100,000 generates an annual risk of infection of 1%" (the rule is no longer used to estimate prevalence of TB). He was also responsible for instituting a systematic feedback method for analyzing outcomes of TB cases, known as the "cohort review" principle (CR), which was adopted in London and outside of the UK.

== Legacy ==
In a historical review of tuberculosis, Murray (2004) writes:

In the mid-1970s, a redoubtable Czech, Karel Styblo, harnessed the meager resources of the International Union against Tuberculosis and Lung Disease and showed that, contrary to expert opinion, tuberculosis could be controlled in extremely poor countries: beginning in Tanzania, one of the poorest of them all.

According to the World Health Organization:

The role of Dr Karel Styblo, IUAT Scientific Director, in the development of these innovative programmes cannot be understated. He combined an astonishing knowledge of the epidemiology of TB with a remarkable understanding of the management principles of TB control and a tenacious commitment to excellence in his work. His contribution to TB was immense, and he will go down in history as the father of modern TB control and one of the heroes of public health of the 20th century. The principles developed by him in Africa were later adapted and promoted by WHO as DOTS, and adopted in places as diverse as China, New York, and India.

Of Styblo, Crofton said:

He was a quiet man, but wonderfully persistent and an enormous worker. Several east African countries had asked for help with tuberculosis and Styblo was sent there. He proved to have a genius for persuading governments that tuberculosis was a major economic problem as well as a public health concern. He was also able to convince them that they could handle diagnosis and treatment through their routine health services, without special tuberculosis clinics and services. Above all he stressed the importance of monitoring patients throughout the course of treatment, as he had seen done in Edinburgh.

Tom Frieden, former director of the U.S. Centers for Disease Control and Prevention, credits feedback from Styblo for leading Frieden to initiate programs that led to a marked reduction in tuberculosis in New York City. In addressing graduates at the Harvard School of Public Health in 2014, Frieden said that Styblo's query about how many patients the New York City program had cured shamed him into "implementing a program to track the outcomes of every single patient diagnosed", adding that the question "changed my life." Frieden said that Styblo's "way of treating tuberculosis has saved millions of lives around the world".

== Recognition ==
Styblo was a recipient of a 1982 Gold Medal award of the Robert Koch Prizes. The International Union Against Tuberculosis and Lung Diseases (IUATLD) instituted the Karel Styblo Public Health Prize after his death, to recognize a "health worker (physician or lay-person) or a community organisation for contributions to tuberculosis control or lung health over a period of 10 years or more".
