= Anne Fanning =

Canadian physician and researcher

Anne Fanning (born 1939) is a Canadian physician and expert in tuberculosis. Born in 1939 in London, Ontario, Fanning studied medicine at the University of Western Ontario and undertook postgraduate training at the University of Alberta. Fanning worked as a researcher and professor at the University of Alberta beginning in 1973, and as a clinical physician at the University of Alberta Hospital and the Aberhart Hospital. She designed a tuberculosis clinic for Edmonton and headed the tuberculosis program of the province of Alberta from 1987 to 1996. She was "forced out of her job" because of her criticisms of planned program cuts. She then moved to Vienna to work with the World Health Organization as the WHO Medical Officer for Global TB Education from 1998 to 1999. From 2000 to 2003 she served as president of the International Union Against Tuberculosis and Lung Disease. She developed a global health program for the University of Alberta before retiring in 2005.

She founded and is on the Executive Committee of Stop TB Canada. She is also on the board of Keiskamma Canada and the Alberta Council for Global Cooperation. She and her husband Melvyn Binder have two daughters.

Fanning is a professor emerita of the University of Alberta. She became a member of the Order of Canada in 2007 and received the Diamond Jubilee medal in 2012. She was the 2014 recipient of the Frederic Newton Gisborne Starr Award from the Canadian Medical Association. Other awards include the Japanese Anti-Tuberculosis Association TB Global Award; the Alberta Centennial Medal; a Lifetime Achievement Award from the Canadian Society for International Health; the Alberta Order of Excellence; the May Cohen Award from the Royal College of Physicians and Surgeons of Canada; and being named as "One of Alberta's Physicians of the Century" by the Alberta Medical Association.
