= Mita Pardo de Tavera =

Filipino pulmonologist and social worker

Secretary of Social Welfare and Development Minister of Social Welfare and Development (1986–1987)
- In office February 25, 1986 – June 30, 1992
- President: Corazon Aquino
- Preceded by: Sylvia P. Montes
- Succeeded by: Corazon Alma de Leon

Chairperson of the Philippine Charity Sweepstakes Office
- In office 1992–1994
- President: Fidel V. Ramos
- Succeeded by: Manuel Morato

Personal details
- Born: Carmen Manzano Pardo de Tavera; November 19, 1919
- Died: October 23, 2007 (aged 87)
- Education: University of the Philippines
- Occupation: Pulmonologist

Carmen "Mita" Manzano Pardo de Tavera (November 19, 1919 – October 23, 2007) was a Filipino pulmonologist, writer, socio-civic leader, and community health worker. She served as Secretary of Social Welfare and Development during the administration of President Corazon Aquino. Pardo de Tavera is also known to develop a program that educated the illiterate and the poor about natural healing remedies and as a staunch opposition to the Marcos administration and the martial law era.

== Early life and education ==
Pardo de Tavera is born to the distinguished and nationalistic Pardo de Tavera clan. She is a great-granddaughter of Joaquin Pardo de Tavera, the lawyer of the martyred triumvirate of Gomburza, and granddaughter of Trinidad Pardo de Tavera, delegate of the Malolos Congress and served under the administration of President Emilio Aguinaldo. She translated into English the cookbooks of her great-grandmother, Doña Juliana Pardo de Tavera y Gorricho, who loved to cook and throw parties in the 19th century in their family home in Paris.

Pardo de Tavera graduated from medical school at the University of the Philippines in 1944. During her internship at the Philippine General Hospital, she realized the dire need of healthcare services during wartime for the sick and the wounded. After graduation, she joined the Philippine Tuberculosis Society (PTS) and the Quezon Institute (QI), a former military hospital used by the Americans and then the Japanese. Being an only child, her mother was against her working at the hospital and so worried because she might catch tuberculosis, then considered an incurable disease.

== Career ==
Pardo de Tavera has served for three decades at QI, where she also specialized in the treatment of pediatric tuberculosis. She was a member of the Board of Directors of the PTS and was appointed as Executive Secretary on April 27, 1973. According to her, she resigned in 1974 for personal reasons. The PTS has declared her position as vacant on May 29, 1974, and appointed Alberto Romulo to the position.

Pardo de Tavera then founded the Alay Kapwa Kilusang Pangakalusugan (AKAP) ("Health Movement of the People, For the People, By the People") with the approval and support of Bishop Julio Labayen. Bishop Labayen offered the space above the garage of the Catholic Bishops Conference of the Philippines in Pasay to be their AKAP's office in its early years. AKAP is an organization of volunteer health workers to teach preventive health care to impoverished communities.

In September 1978, Pardo de Tavera presented her research published as "A Model of Supervised Community Participation in the Prevention and Short-term Therapy of TB Among the Poor in Asia" at the 24th Conference of the International Union Against Tuberculosis, held in Brussels, Belgium. The research proposed an alternative in providing effective healthcare in poor communities by community based health programs focusing on the prevention of the disease and the training of local residents, activities which are done by AKAP. Pardo de Tavera claims that her research has caused international doctors to get excited in the activities of AKAP, which then led to an organization from The Netherlands to donate an amount equivalent between four and five million pesos.

Because of her community-based approach, Pardo de Tavera was suspected a communist by the authorities. She would then be a militant activist during the martial law era and actively participated in the street protests against the dictatorship of President Ferdinand Marcos. She spent four months in the United States to raise funds and joined the organization Women Against Marcos and the Dictatorship.

Pardo de Tavera was appointed by President Corazon Aquino as secretary of social welfare after the ouster of the Marcos dictatorship. Under her leadership in the social welfare department, she created the Inspection and Acceptance Committee (IAC) as an internal control system under the principle of check and balance. In 2009, the IAC has been renamed to Inspection Committee. She was also the chairperson of National Nutrition Council Governing Board from 1987 to 1988. She served under the Aquino cabinet until June 30, 1992.

After her stint as secretary, Pardo de Tavera became the Chair of Philippine Charity Sweepstakes Office (PCSO). Under her term, Pardo de Tavera was credited for her efforts to settle the case between PCSO and QI, where the former is claiming to be the owner of the latter. It was also under her leadership that the Out-Patient Department of QI was renovated and improved.

Pardo de Tavera also became the President of the Philippine Cancer Society (PCS). As president of PCS, she focused on care of cancer patients who are given short term survival by their doctors. In 1991, PCS launched the Hospice Care Program.

=== Literary works ===
Aside from writing all the eighty-five educational pamphlets of AKAP and the research paper she presented in Brussels, Pardo de Tavera is also credited in writing the following research and educational materials:

- Pulmonary Schistosomiasis in the Philippines - presented at the International Congress on Diseases of the Chest at Copenhagen, on August 20–25, 1966.
- Tuberculosis in Filipino Children - printed by Lyceum Press, 1975
- The control of Tuberculosis (Ang Pagsugpo sa Tuberkulosis o Tisis): Course of instruction for community health workers (Hanay ng aralin na ukol sa mga manggagawang pampurok na pangkalusugan) - printed by Lyceum Press, 1975

=== Later years and death ===
Pardo de Tavera still continued working for AKAP but because of her old age, she cannot go to places requiring long travel. Instead, she continued to train trainer-volunteers in her residence.

In July 1995, Pardo de Tavera turned over a total of 13,000 volumes of books, 1,500 manuscripts, 4,500 correspondences, and 639,000 photos, to Ateneo de Manila, which were originally owned by her grandfather Trinidad, collectively known as the Pardo de Tavera collection. In October 2000, the Pardo de Tavera collection has become a separate section of the Rizal Library.

In 2004, her diamond jubilee year as a doctor, Pardo de Tavera chose her healthcare booklets to best represent her legacy.

On October 23, 2007, Pardo de Tavera died due to leukemia.

== Awards and honors ==
In 1994, the Philippine Medical Association (PMA) awarded Pardo de Tavera the PMA Dr. Jose P. Rizal Award for her "outstanding community services and medical ethics".

On June 26, 1998, through a Board Resolution, PTS renamed the Out-Patient Department of QI to "Dr. Mita Pardo de Tavera Hall".

In 2019, Pardo de Tavera was awarded the SIKAT Awards at the 7th Conference of the Union Asia Pacific Region. The award was given to honor "leaders in their respective fields who have provided strength, inspiration, knowledge and action" against tuberculosis.
