= Rene Saguisag =

Filipino politician (1939–2024)

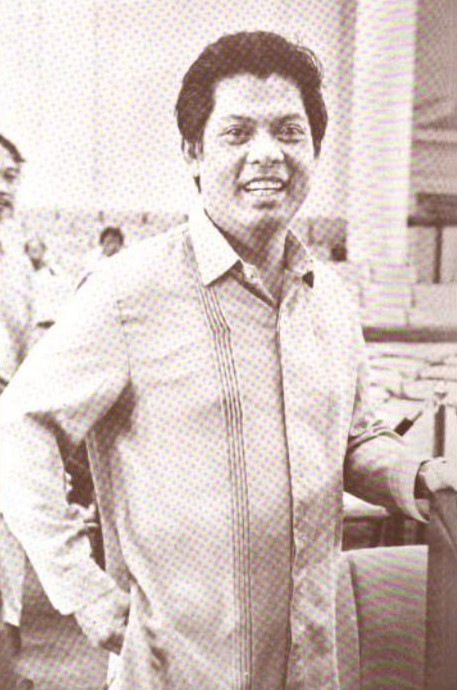
- Saguisag as a senator, photograph released by the Philippine Congress, c. 1988

Senator of the Philippines
- In office August 15, 1987 – June 30, 1992

Presidential Spokesperson
- In office February 25, 1986 – March 8, 1987
- President: Corazon Aquino
- Preceded by: Position established
- Succeeded by: Vacant (post later held by Adolfo Azcuna)

Personal details
- Born: Rene Augusto Verceluz Saguisag; August 14, 1939 Mauban, Tayabas, Commonwealth of the Philippines
- Died: April 24, 2024 (aged 84)
- Resting place: Manila Memorial Park – Sucat, Paranaque, Philippines
- Party: Liberal (1987–2024)
- Other political affiliations: PDP–Laban (until 1987)
- Spouse: Dulce Quintans (m. 1969; died 2007)
- Children: 5
- Education: San Beda (BA, LL.B.); University of the East (no degree); Harvard University (LL.M.)
- Occupation: Lawyer; Writer
- Profession: Lawyer

Rene Augusto Verceluz Saguisag (/sɑːɡɪsɑːɡ/; August 14, 1939 – April 24, 2024) was a Filipino lawyer and politician. He served as a Senator from 1987 until 1992.

Saguisag became a human rights lawyer from 1972 to 1986 during the Martial Law period and served as the Presidential Spokesperson of Corazon Aquino from 1986 to 1987. After serving as a Senator for one term, he became a defense lawyer during the trial of Joseph Estrada.

== Early life ==
Rene Augusto Verceluz Saguisag was born on August 14, 1939, in Mauban, Tayabas, Philippines to Antonio Lozada Saguisag Sr., an engineering graduate from the National University and Eusebia Nivadura Verceluz, whom Rene described as a Spanish-looking mestiza housewife. The couple had seven children including one daughter. They were Antonio, Rene who was second, Leonidas or Idas, Precioso who was named after Precioso Palma, Lourdes who was the only daughter, Rogelio or Roger, and Romy who was born in Pasig, finished at the University of the Philippines in Chemistry, but due to a congenital defect died in 2011. Saguisag is also the nephew of Sen. Jovito R. Salonga, specifically Salonga is the second cousin once removed of Saguisag, as Saguisag's paternal grandmother Talia Saguisag is the first cousin of Salonga's mother Dinang Reyes. Saguisag grew up in Pasig, Rizal and attended elementary school at Makati Elementary School, quickly accelerated to the second grade in a few weeks, and graduated in 1951 instead of 1952. He graduated from Rizal High School in 1955, which led Saguisag to claim because he finished basic schooling in nine years the K-12 program is inconsequential for the Philippine education system. He developed a strong interest in Chess, and skipped class at the expense of his teachers, who promoted corporal punishment, even if he was a consistent honor student.

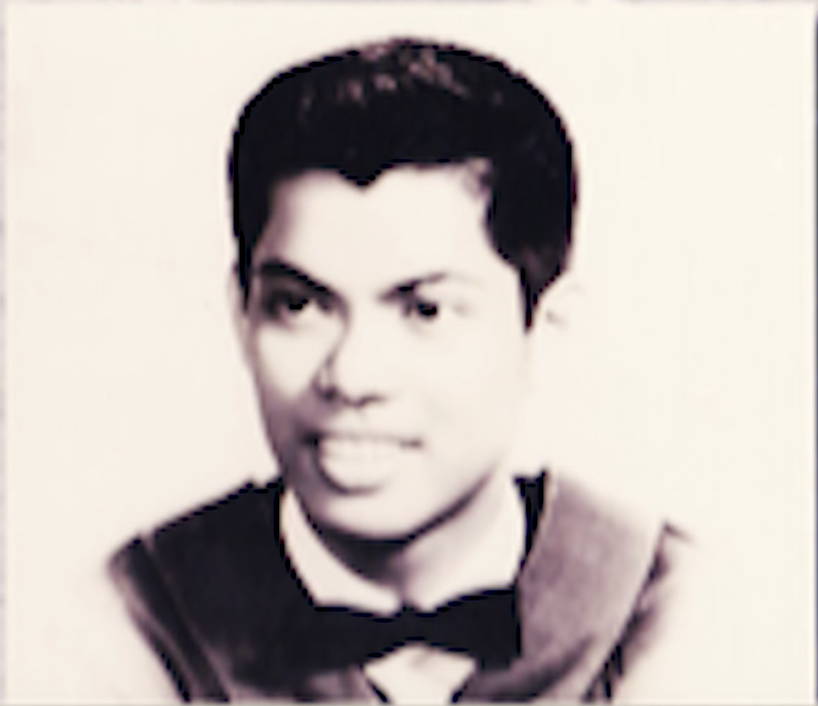
Saguisag's graduation photo in 1963

Saguisag went on to graduate with a Bachelor of Arts degree in 1959 from San Beda College with honor-level grades, taking one semester studying one of his favorite subjects, Spanish, at the University of the East to complete requirements. He also later graduated cum laude from San Beda College with a bachelor of laws degree in 1963 and placed 6th in the same year's Bar Examinations. In order to make ends meet, Saguisag worked as a checker, laborer, construction site guard, and messenger from 1959 to 1962. Saguisag then had to choose to study in Spain at the University of Navarra, or the University of Michigan, where he topped the competition for scholarships. However he was accepted into Harvard after sending a letter in what he called a rinky-dink typewriter where, "lulundag ang mga keys" (the keys would fall off). Saguisag eventually entered Harvard and obtained his Master of Laws degree from Harvard Law School in 1968. He first worked in private companies in the United States, including a San Francisco law firm as training grounds. It was here where he befriended client Joe McMicking, who developed the city of Makati on behalf of Ayala Corporation. Saguisag then started out his Philippine career as a student researcher, then associate, and eventually part-time member of Ledesma, Guytingco, Velasco and Saguisag from 1962 to 1972. He became a member of the San Beda Law Faculty (Assistant Dean 1971–1972) from 1961 to 1972, and eventually returned to teach Political law and other related subjects after martial law.

== Martial Law ==
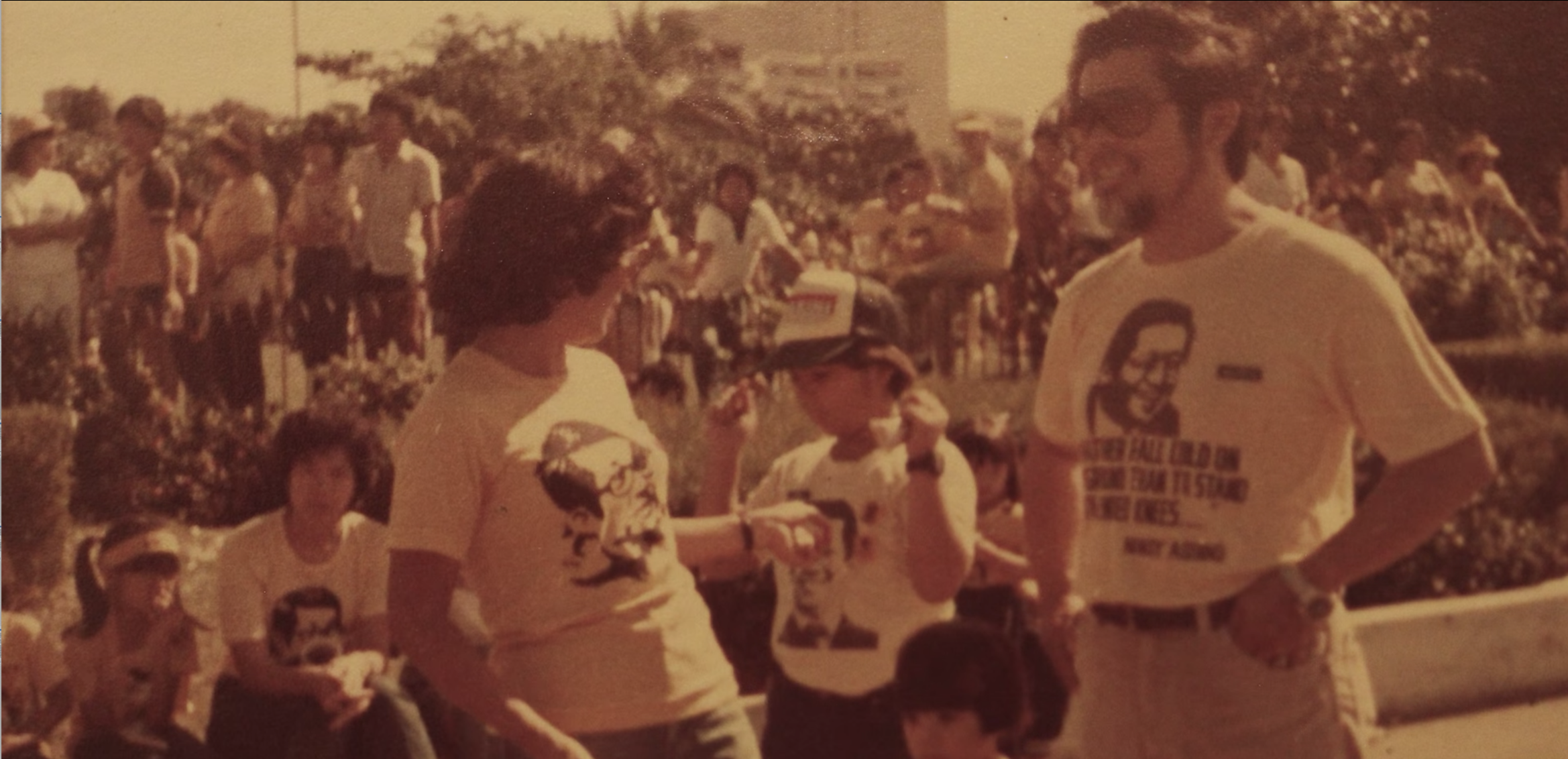
Saguisag in 1986

Rene A.V. Saguisag then practiced law as a prominent human rights lawyer in the Philippines from 1972 to 1986 when martial law brought about multiple human rights abuses. He joined the Free Legal Assistance Group or FLAG, an organization founded in late 1974 by fellow oppositionists and principal litigation mentors in Saguisag's young career, FLAG chairman Sen. Jose W. Diokno and former Sen. Lorenzo M. Tañada. One of the FLAG cases Saguisag handled was to prosecute the Manero brothers who killed Fr. Tullio Favali.

Later, some FLAG lawyers including Saguisag and other prominent human rights jurists started the Movement of Attorneys for Brotherhood, Integrity and Nationalism, Inc. or MABINI in 1980 with former Senator Tañada, future Senator Joker Arroyo, future Labor Secretary Augusto "Bobbit" Sanchez, and others. Their cases became landmark Supreme Court decisions, including Olaguer v. Military Commission No. 34, 150 SCRA 144 (1987).

== Presidential spokesperson ==
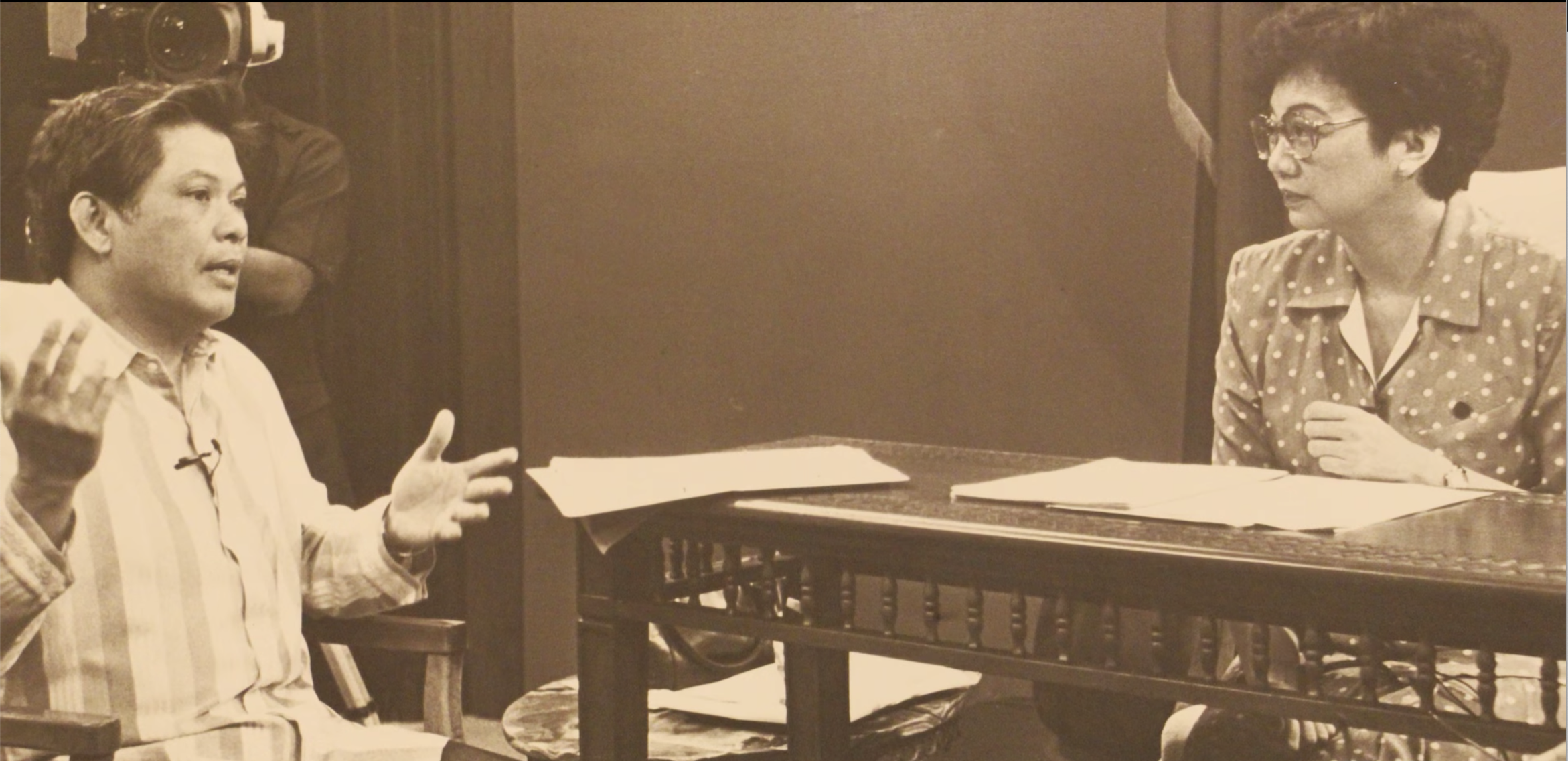
Saguisag with Cory Aquino

After the 1986 EDSA Revolution, he served as a spokesman for then-President-elect Corazon Aquino or "Cory" beginning on January 22, 1986.

A year later in January 1987, Aquino offered Saguisag opportunity to become Justice of the Supreme Court, which would have made him the youngest to justice to be appointed to the court at the time. Aquino had even already signed the appointment papers, but Saguisag refused the appointment.

Saguisag later recounted that Pres. Cory Aquino would often push him to run for the senate, teased him that it was her intent to become her successor. Eventually Saguisag decided to run for senator in the first constitutional election held in 1987.

== Philippine Senate ==
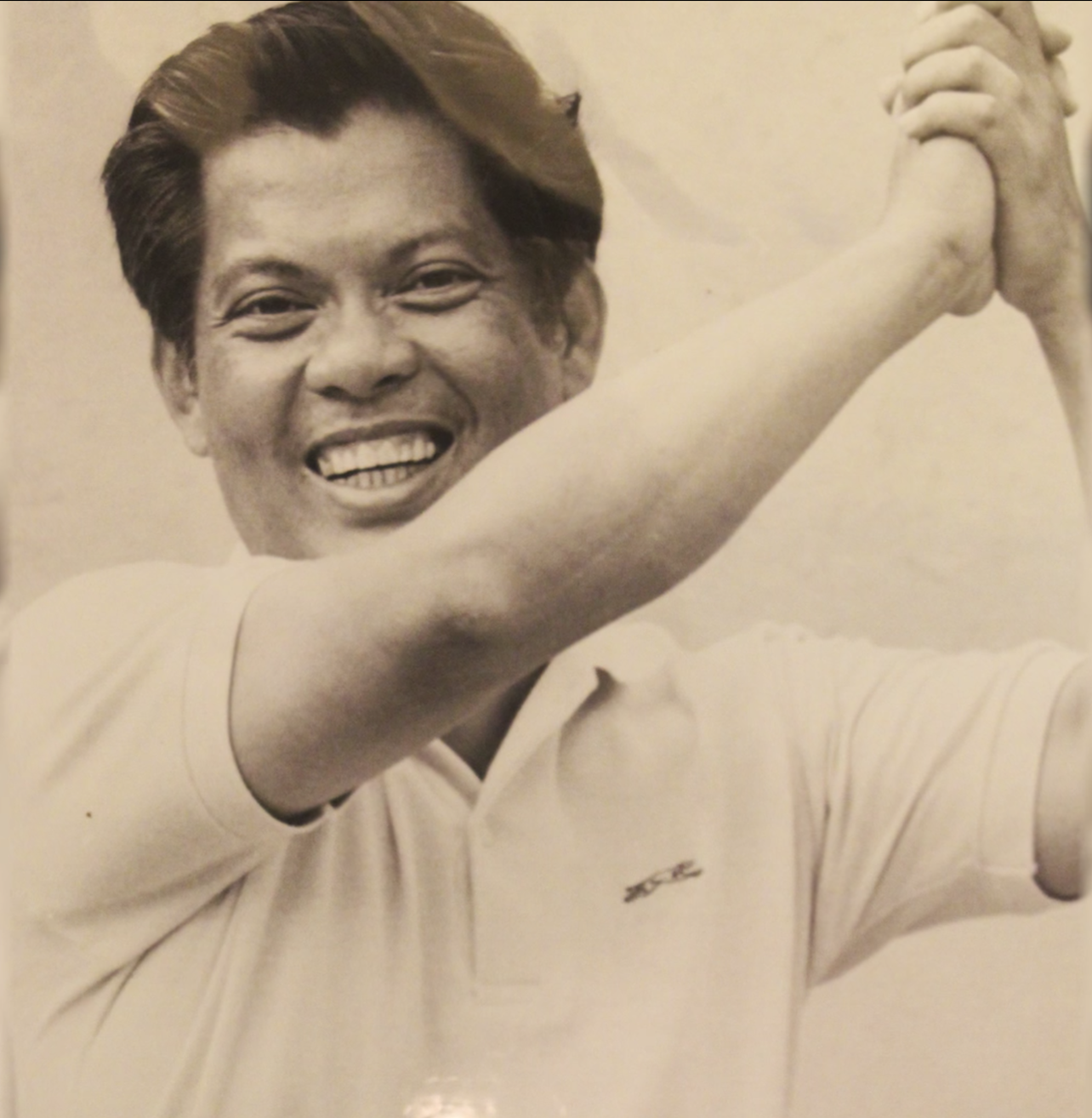
Saguisag wins the Senate in 1987

Saguisag ran for the Senate of the Philippines as a Liberal in 1987, promising during the campaign that he would only run for one term. He won the election, placing ninth out of twenty-four winning positions. He stayed in the Senate until the end of his promised one term, in 1992.

As a senator, Saguisag served as Chairman of the Committee on Ethics and Privileges. He also served on the "ad hoc" committee on the Bataan Nuclear Power Plant. Among his staff was Maria Lourdes Tiquia, who worked in his Senate office until 1990.

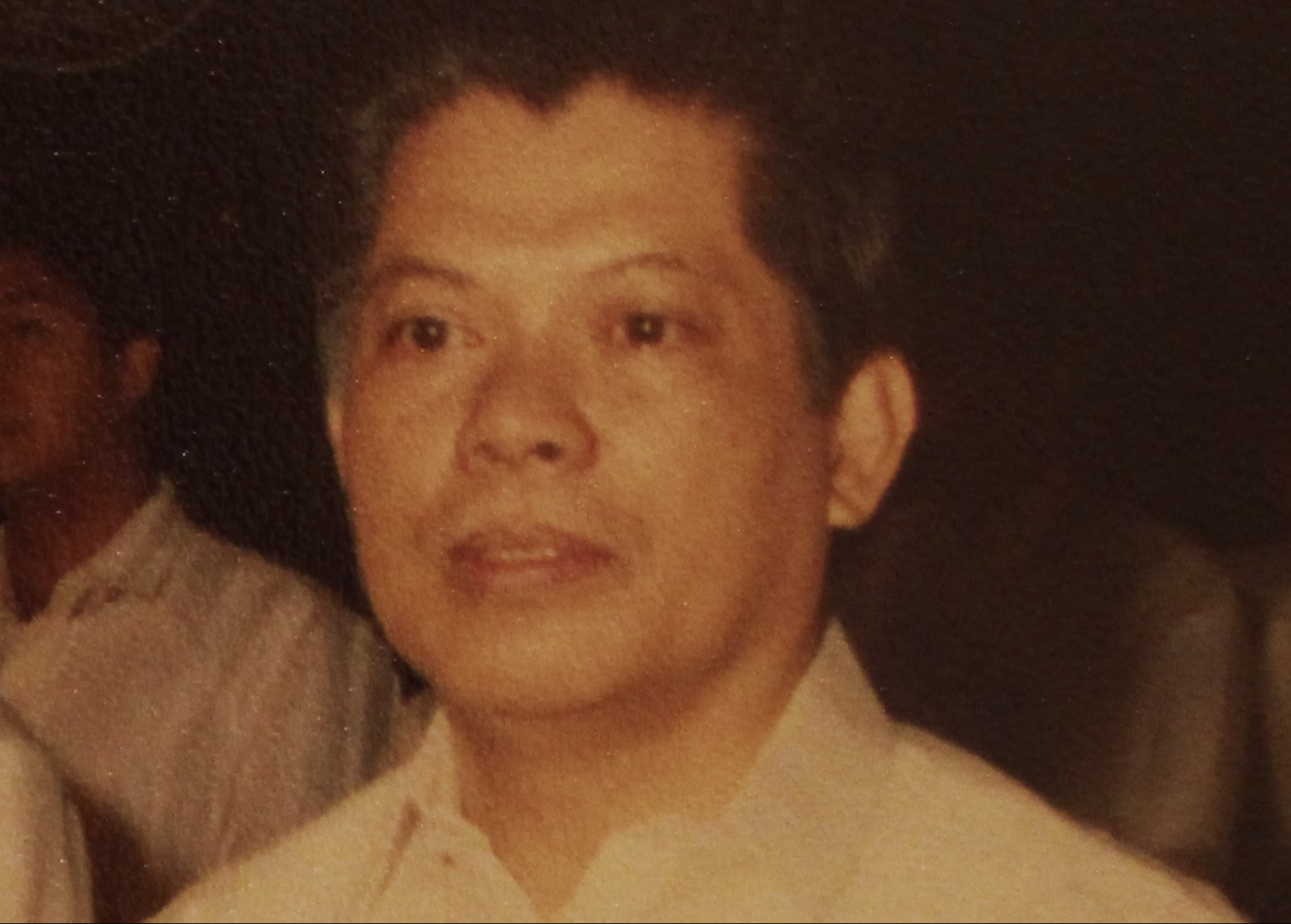
Saguisag in 1990

Saguisag was the co-author with his uncle, Jovito Salonga of the Code of Conduct and Ethical Standards for Public Officials and Employees (R.A. 6713), the main author of the Ombudsman Act of 1989 (R.A. 6770), and was one of the 12 senators who voted against the extension of the U.S. military bases treaty in 1991.

Saguisag was one of only two Filipino senators who attended all 415 session days from July 1987 to June 1990, with the other being Ernesto Maceda. Saguisag was frequently commuting through a taxi and bringing his own lunch instead of catering offered from the taxpayers. Saguisag mainly wanted to retire from the Senate early due to the excesses of corruption around the political arena. His experience not having to pay a centavo to win the election came due to the high-tide of trust in the new Aquino government, however it slowly devolved into campaigning mixed with showbusiness, thus prompting more actors and entertainers to become senators.

== Post-Senate career ==
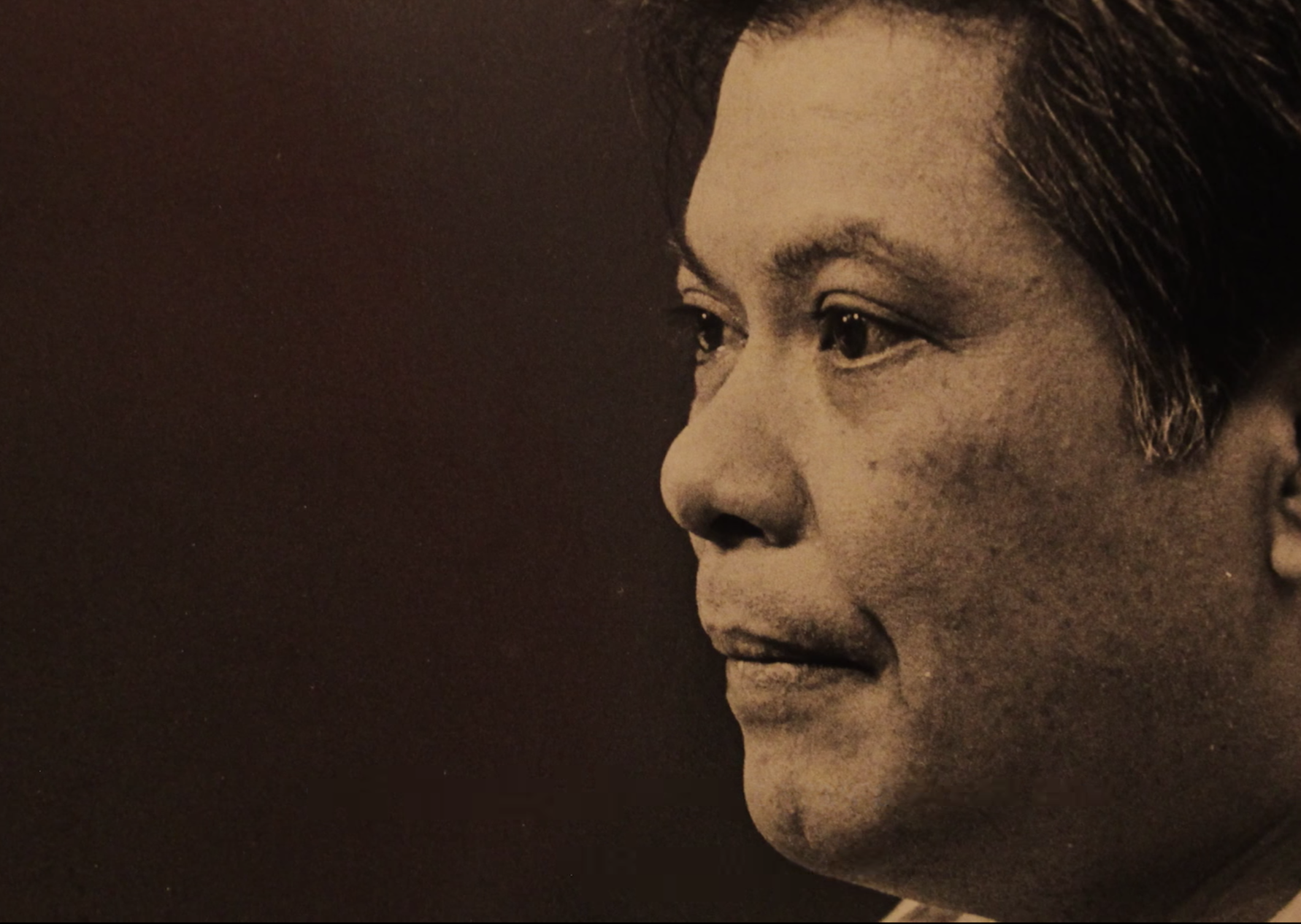
Saguisag in 1988

Following his departure from the Senate, right after the Philippine Centennial celebrations, Saguisag was appointed by Joseph Estrada to head the Ad Hoc and Independent Citizens' Committee (AHICC) with members Atty. Francis Pangilinan, Engr. Fiorello Estuar, USec. Antonio M. Llorente, and Corazon dela Paz. AHICC was created by President Estrada on February 24, 1999, through Administrative Order No. 53 to investigate if there were irregularities that transpired during the preparations and celebrations of the Philippine Centennial. AHICC found that the bidding for certain centennial projects had been rigged, that certain documents used in the bidding had been falsified, and that certain signatures on documents were forged.

Saguisag became one of the leading defense lawyers in the trial of former President Estrada. At this point Saguisag's law firm, the Rene A.V. Saguisag Law Office became a prominent law firm, and many prominent lawyers worked under Saguisag such as former Napocor President Cyril del Callar. Saguisag remained focused on his law firm and on teaching human rights and the rule of law. He continued to make appearances and discuss the political situation in news shows and articles.

=== Later activities ===
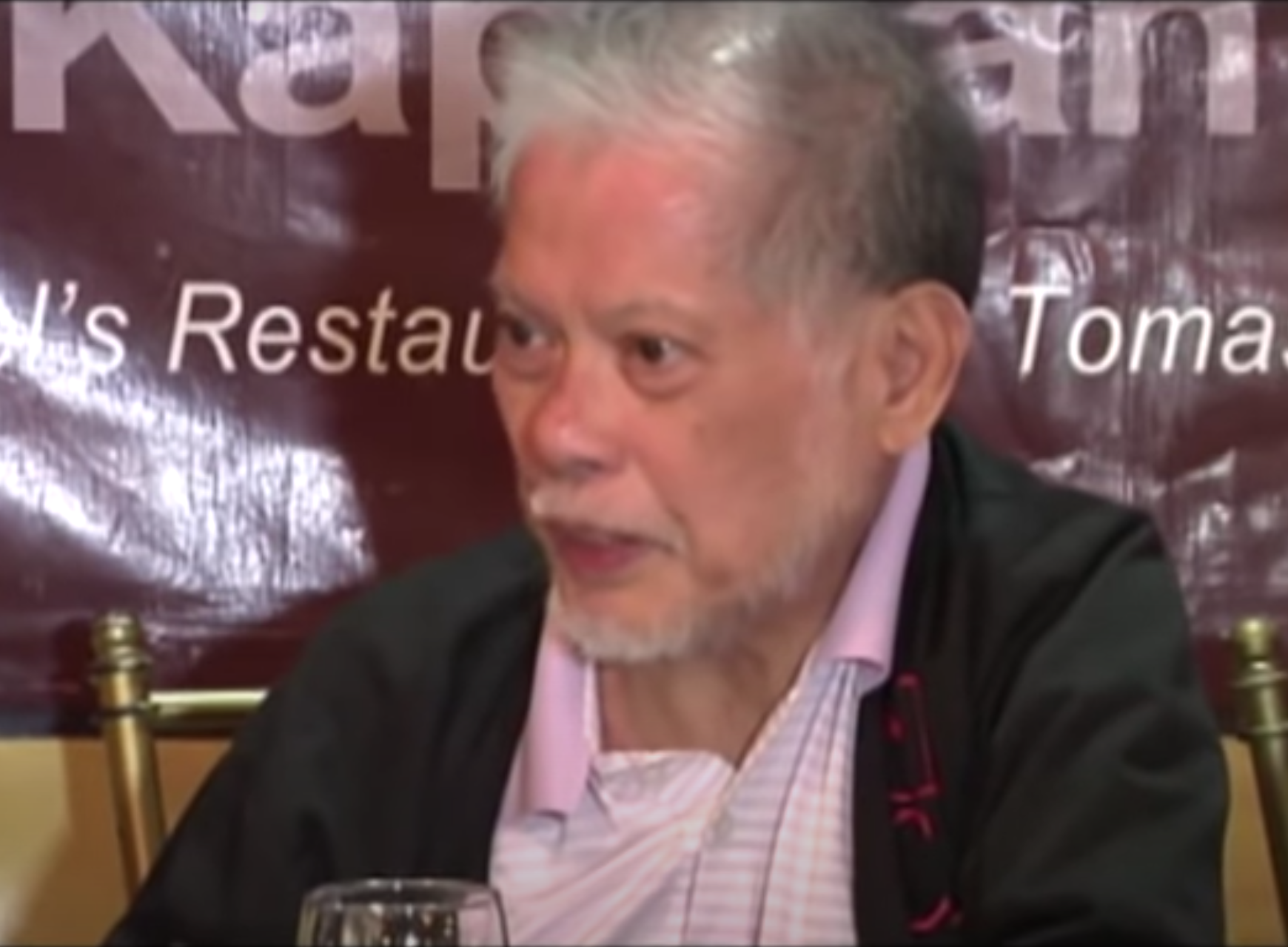
Saguisag in a press conference, 2014

Atty. Saguisag was a columnist for the Manila Times with his column entitled "TGIF", and was still actively teaching Constitutional Law and Human Rights Law at San Beda Mendiola and San Beda Alabang. He has also written for the Philippine Daily Inquirer and other newspapers. Saguisag had also not stopped his work on human rights, and has filed cases against the Anti-Terror Law of 2020 and the Enhanced Defense Cooperation Agreement (EDCA) treaty under President Benigno Aquino III. Saguisag has not been shy of criticizing any politician including Cory Aquino's son due to Saguisag's argument that EDCA is a formal treaty that needs Senate ratification, and not a shallow agreement that the president can make binding by his word of mouth as signature to an agreement.

Saguisag also wrote some popular books, including Saguisag Wit – 1 and Saguisag Wit – 2. In the books he discussed about his life lessons, and his opinion on the people he worked with, including his friend, the late senator Joker Arroyo. Saguisag still frequently made appearances to give his review and criticism of the modern administrations, including their policies such as the war on drugs of ex-President Rodrigo Duterte, and the disinformation spread by the political dynasty of Imelda Marcos, the wife of former dictator Marcos. The disinformation campaign has been used to promote fabricated lies and boost the appeal of the Bongbong Marcos administration. An instance of Saguisag's commentary was when he critiqued the burial of Marcos Sr. at the Libingan ng mga Bayani, and stated that the Supreme Court's decision to allow the burial since there are no laws disallowing it was absurd. He stated that Marcos's name may also be engraved at the Martial law memorial, the Bantayog ng mga Bayani if common sense is removed from the minds of the judges.

== Personal life ==
Saguisag married Dulce M. Quintans, who was a former Secretary of the Department of Social Welfare and Development under President Joseph Estrada, in Manila on December 27, 1969. They first met in 1968 during his days at Harvard University. Rene eventually proposed saying, "I am poor. I come from a very poor family. I have no money, and I have no belongings, so I don’t want to marry a rich girl. So tell me now, are you rich?" She replied no, to which Rene proposed and then told Mrs. Quintans, his eventual mother-in-law, that he promised to love and care for her daughter for the rest of his life. Dulce, however came from a notable political family, being a descendant of Senator Daniel Maramba, who was also the governor of Pangasinan. The couple then had five children, Rene Andrei Jr. or Rebo, Lara, Nonoy, Lawrence Mikhail, and Caissa. Rene's grandchildren include Rene III who is about 70 years younger.

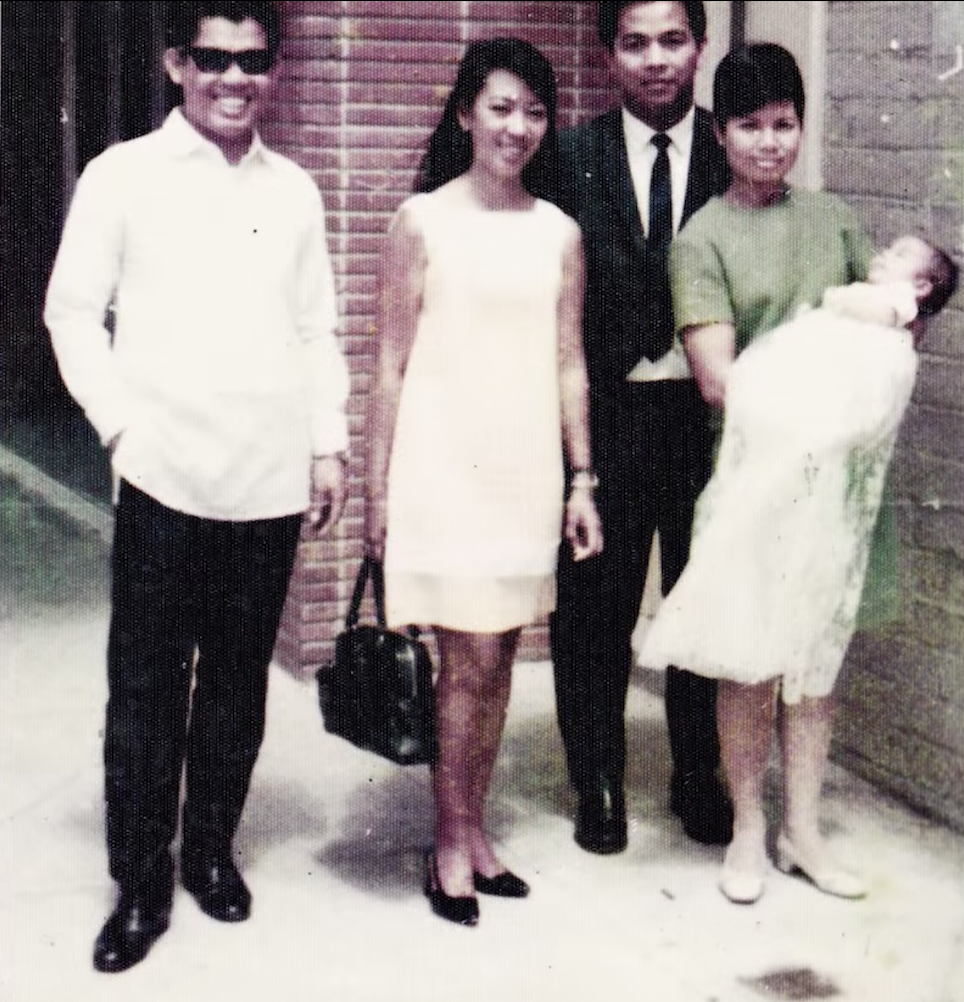
Photo of Rene and Dulce Saguisag (left) in the 1960s

On November 8, 2007, Saguisag was seriously injured in a car crash along Osmeña Highway in Makati. Saguisag and his wife were in their van on their way home to Palanan from one of their usual late-night ballroom dancing sessions at Byke's Cafe along Chino Roces Avenue when a speeding dump truck, running a red light, accidentally struck their vehicle in the middle of the highway. They were rushed to Ospital ng Makati 2 in Bel-Air, where they received initial treatment. He was later transferred to Ospital ng Makati in Pembo for further care. He sustained head and chest injuries with seven fractured ribs, while his driver was injured and Dulce's life was taken. The funeral was held at St. Scholastica's College by Benedictine priests, including Dulce's cousin Dom Benildus Maramba.

Saguisag was left in critical condition following the collision. His injuries included seven broken ribs and small blood clots in his brain. However, his doctors stated that he had a "very good chance" of a full recovery. He spent 20 days in the intensive-care unit without being informed of his wife's death by friend Joker Arroyo, and was released from the hospital on December 8, 2007.

Rene and Dulce's youngest daughter, Caissa Saguisag is a gymnast, but a knee injury ended her quest for gold at the 24th Southeast Asian Games. Their son, Rebo, is also a lawyer who is the executive director and former commissioner of the University Athletic Association of the Philippines, and a city councilor of Makati from 2019 to 2025. Rebo also joined MABINI. According to Saguisag, FLAG pursued a policy of recruiting young lawyers, while MABINI has become an old law firm, which also includes Mayor Abby Binay, whose father Jejomar Binay was vice-president. Saguisag claimed that MABINI has become more "MABINAY" or biased for the Binay dynasty. However, they continued to maintain their friendship from their time at FLAG and MABINI, and spoke out together against the red-tagging from ex-President Duterte and his generals, including Antonio Parlade. Though he did not vote for former President Joseph Estrada, implying he was a substandard president, his wife Dulce worked for Estrada, and Saguisag, like many was completely aghast at the Second EDSA Revolution because it stood against constitutional procedures and devolved into a mob rule. In terms of personal beliefs, Saguisag always maintained a strong faith as a practicing Catholic.

== Death ==
Saguisag died on April 24, 2024, at the age of 84. He had made his final public appearance on April 9 (Day of Valor) at a ceremony at the Bantayog ng mga Bayani in Quezon City.

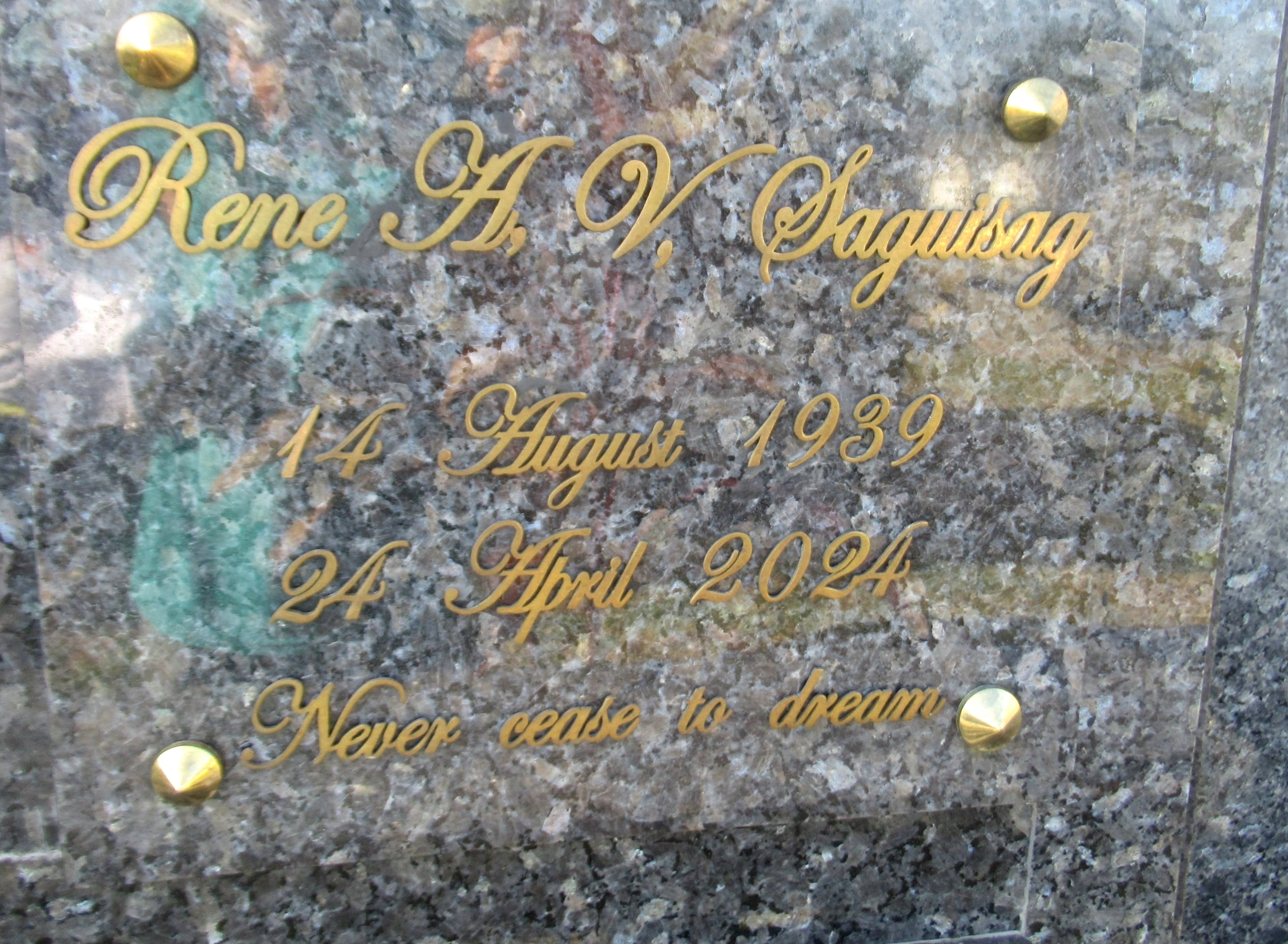
Saguisag's grave at Manila Memorial Park – Sucat

On April 26, 2024, his wake was held at the Santuario de San Antonio Parish Church, Multipurpose Capilla de Virgen, McKinley Road, Forbes Park, Makati.

On May 7, 2024, the Senate of the Philippines flew its national flag at half-mast and approved Resolution No. 1009, which honored Saguisag.

== Awards ==
- Lifetime Achievement Awardee, Integrated Bar of the Philippines (2001)
- Bedan of the Century, San Beda University (2001)
- Benigno S. Aquino Jr. Award for Nationalism, Federation of Catholic School's Alumni Associations (FeCASAA, 2007)
- Outstanding Golden Jubilarian, San Beda College of Law Class of 1963 (November 2013)
- On April 9, 2024, Day of Valor, the 38th Foundation of Bantayog ng mga Bayani awarded 13 honorees led by Artemio Panganiban and Saguisag. The living heroes were crowned as “Haligi ng Bantayog” with handmade "Sablay" at the University of the Philippines Hotel.
