= International Union Against Tuberculosis and Lung Disease =

Non-governmental scientific organization

- The International Union Against Tuberculosis and Lung Diseases
- Nickname: The Union
- Formation: 20 October 1920
- Type: NGO, Nonprofit
- Purpose: Public Health, Evidence to Policy, Tuberculosis, Lung Health, Anti-tobacco
- Headquarters: Paris, France
- President: Guy Marks
- Website: theunion.org
- Formerly called: International Union Against Tuberculosis (IUAT) International Union Against Tuberculosis and Lung Disease (IUATLD)

The International Union Against Tuberculosis and Lung Disease, or The Union, is a century old global membership based, scientific organization headquartered in Paris with the stated vision to "A healthier world for all, free of tuberculosis and lung disease". The Union focuses its work in three areas of lung health: Tuberculosis control, Tobacco Control, and other communicable and non-communicable Lung diseases.The Union organises the World Conference on Lung Health, the largest annual meeting on lung health in the world, manages a number of scientific publications such as the International Journal of Tuberculosis and Lung Disease, and implements various funded projects and activities across the world.

== History ==
The Union was founded in Paris on 20 October 1920, during the first post-war international conference on TB at the Sorbonne University, where the representatives of 31 countries pledged to work together to fight the disease. The antecedents of The Union include the former Central Bureau for the Prevention of Tuberculosis. At the time it was known as the International Union Against Tuberculosis (IUAT) and was renamed in 1995 to the current one to include other lung diseases. Early pioneers were Robert Koch, Sir John Crofton and Karel Styblo.

According to The Lancet, in the 1970s, Styblo "harnessed the meager resources of the International Union against Tuberculosis and Lung Disease and showed that, contrary to expert opinion, tuberculosis could be controlled in extremely poor countries: beginning in Tanzania, one of the poorest of them all". In 1982, it instituted World Tuberculosis Day, commemorating 100 years from the date when Robert Koch discovered cause of tuberculosis. The expanded name and mission were adopted in 1986.

Past presidents include:

- 1921: Robert Philip
- 1922: E Dewez
- 1924: F Morin
- 1926: Theobald Smith
- 1928: F A Piomarta
- 1930: Théodor Frölich
- 1932: Willelm Nolen
- 1934: Eugenjusz Piestrzynski
- 1937: Lopo de Carvalho
- 1950: K A Jensen
- 1952: Manoel de Abreu
- 1954: A Crespo Alvarez
- 1957: P. V. Benjamin
- 1959: Ismail Tewfik Saglam
- 1961: G J Wherrett
- 1963: Attilio Omodei Zorini
- 1965: Erich Schröder
- 1967: Jan K Kraan
- 1969: James E Perkins
- 1971: V Chebanov
- 1973: T Shimatzu
- 1975: Miguel Jimenez
- 1978: A Gyselen
- 1983: H Rodriguez Castells
- 1986: N C Sen Gupta
- 1990: James Swomley
- 1994: Rudolf Ferlinz
- 1995–1998: Songkram Supcharoen
- 1999–2000: Kjell Bjartveit
- 2001–2003: Anne Fanning
- 2004–2007: Asma El Sony
- 2008–2011: S. Bertel Squire
- 2012–2016: E. Jane Carter
- 2017–2019: J. Chakaya Muhwa
- 2020–present: Guy Marks

== Activities ==
According to its website, The Union has twelve offices around the world serving Africa, the Asia Pacific, Europe, Latin America, the Middle East, North America and South-East Asia, with a focus on tuberculosis, HIV, lung health and non-communicable diseases, tobacco control and research.

== Publications ==
The Union publishes four scientific journals; the International Journal of Tuberculosis and Lung Disease (IJTLD), Public Health Action (PHA), IJTLD Open and IJTLD Chronic Respiratory Disease (IJTLD CRD).

The IJTLD is a traditional subscription journal (freely available to Union members) focused on clinical research and epidemiological studies on tuberculosis and chronic respiratory conditions, including asthma, COPD and the hazards of tobacco and air pollution.

IJTLD Open is an open access sister title to the IJTLD with a focus on infectious respiratory diseases, including TB and non-tuberculous mycobacteria (NTM), alongside the role of risk factors and comorbidities. The journal includes a broader range of article types than the traditional IJTLD (including: Meeting reports; Guidelines/Consensus documents; Study Protocols; Case reports and Case series).

IJTLD CRD is an open access sister title to the IJTLD with a focus on chronic respiratory conditions, including: post TB lung disease (PTLD), asthma, COPD, impact of air pollution, lung damage in smokers, interstitial lung disease, bronchiectasis, long COVID, sleep apnoea, occupational lung disease and interventional pulmonology.

Public Health Action is The Union's open-access journal, focused on operational research that addresses issues in health systems and services and aims to provide new knowledge to improve access, equity, quality and efficiency of health systems and services.
