= Battle of Vilémov =

Coordinates: 49°48′57″N 15°32′21″E

- Part of Bohemian–Hungarian War (1468–1478)
- George of Poděbrady watching encircled Hungarian army
Date	26 February 1469
Location	Vilémov, Czech Republic
Result	Bohemian victory

Belligerents
Bohemian Crown	Crusade: Hungarian Crown; Union of Zelená Hora

Commanders and leaders
George of Poděbrady	Matthias Corvinus

Strength
25,000 men	20,000 men

Battle of Vilémov was a military clash between the Bohemian army under the command of the Bohemian King George of Poděbrady and the Hungarian army as part of the Crusade campaign led by the Hungarian King Matthias Corvinus within the framework of the Bohemian-Hungarian Wars. It took place on 26 February 1469, in the vicinity of the village of Vilémov and ended with the encirclement of Corvinus' army in the valley of the river Doubrava, after which the two monarchs met and talked in Úhrov averting a direct clash of troops. Corvinus then left the battlefield with his army with the promise of leaving the Bohemian Kingdom but soon afterwards he started fighting again.

Although this combat situation is called a battle, it was primarily a strategic victory of the Bohemian army, which was achieved with small numbers of casualties on both sides. From a broader perspective, however, it was unable to avert Corvinus' political rise.

== Background ==
On 23 December 1466, Pope Paul II declared Bohemian King George of Poděbrady as a heretic deposed from the throne and declared a crusade against the Hussite Bohemia. In 1467, the Pope confirmed Zdeněk of Šternberk, the leader of the Union of Zelená Hora, as the leader of the Catholics. Crusaders from the surrounding countries were sent to help him, but their attack was successfully countered by the troops of George of Poděbrady. In March 1468, the executor of the papal curse, King Matthias Corvinus of Hungary, started a direct fight. He invaded Moravia and gradually liquidated the positions of George of Poděbrady, who had so far unsuccessfully summoned the Czech army for an effective counterattack. In May, there was fighting in southwestern Moravia, and on 14 May, Třebíč was captured by attack. Then Matthias' troops besieged the Špilberk castle in Brno and the fortified monastery of Hradisko near Olomouc. Bohemian expedition against Matthias' troops ended in disaster when the Bohemian army was dispersed in the Battle of Zvole and its commander Zdeněk Kostka of Postupice was mortally wounded. After the siege, garrison of the Hradisko monastery also surrendered, and in February 1469, after a six-month siege, Špilberk also surrendered.

=== Campaign in Bohemia ===
At the beginning of February 1469, Matthias Corvinus with a strong army of approximately 20,000 men launched his campaign in Bohemia. He planned to attack Kutná Hora, an important town with silver mines. However, the acute threat of invasion and persistent political efforts finally convinced the Czech nobility to send their troops, and the army summoned to Kutná Hora was soon ready to face an outnumbered attack. The crusade subsequently penetrated the Chrudim region, where it joined forces with the troops of Zelenohorská jednoty near Hrochov Týnec, but subsequently failed in an attempt to conquer Chrudim, during which Matthias himself was almost captured. King George then decided to go with his army to Čáslav and confront Corvinus there. Reports of the number of Czechs, poor supplies and the winter finally forced Corvinus to retreat back to Moravia through the area of the Bohemian-Moravian Highlands.

== Battle ==
The most suitable route for the Hungarian army was a march along the bank of the river Doubrava through Žleby, Ronov and Chotěboř. The terrain-savvy Bohemian army supported by the local population successfully blocked bridges and fords across the river and thus trapped Corvinus' troops between it and the steep foothills of the Iron Mountains. In addition to high snowdrifts and George's army had the advantage of a number of wagons, which allowed for faster movements, and they were also easily converted into a Wagon fort, ideal for creating blocking positions. Part of the Bohemians eventually crossed the river to be advancing behind Corvinus' army while faster Bohemian army managed to get in front of Corvinus a few kilometers east of Vilémov. The encirclement was completed on 26 February 1469.

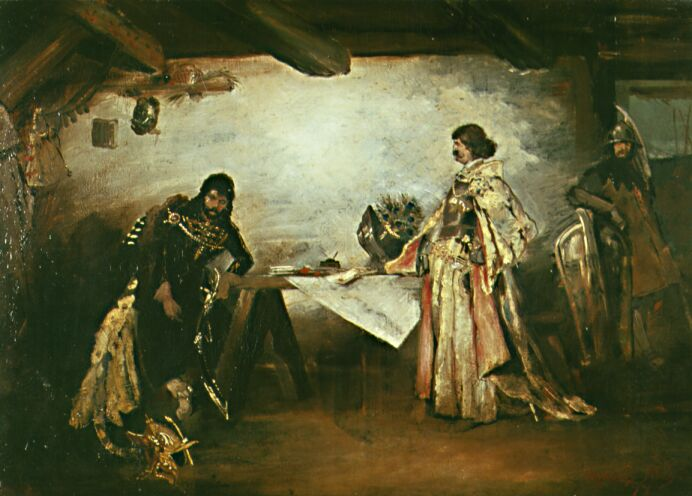
George of Poděbrady meeting Matthias Corvinus

From a military point of view, the situation for Corvinus was extremely unfavorable in the case of direct combat. His army was trapped in the valley of the Doubrava and as a result surrounded from three sides. Hungarian army, tired from many days of long march in snowy terrain, would not be able to withstand the odds. However, the Bohemian army would probably also suffer significant losses in a direct battle. Matthias was thus forced to meet George of Poděbrady, which allegedly took place on 27 February in the building of a burnt-out forge in the village of Úhrov under a later memorable linden tree. The actual content of the conversation cannot be verified, but Corvinus promised there that he would leave further animosity towards the Bohemian king. He and his men were released and taken back to Moravia for his promise.

== Aftermath ==
Matthias did not keep his promise and continued to fight against George. On 3 May of the same year, he was selected King of Bohemia by Catholic lords in Olomouc. In June, however, Bohemian Regional Assembly rejected this choice and, at the suggestion of George of Poděbrady, recognized the succession of Vladislaus II Jagiellon to Bohemian throne. Especially in Moravia and Silesia, fights broke out between the supporters of the two feuding camps, and clashes basically took place until the death of Corvinus in 1490.
