= Judy Taguiwalo =

Filipino social worker and educator

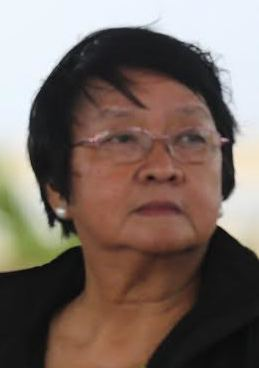
- Taguiwalo in October 2016

Secretary of Social Welfare and Development
- Ad interim
- In office June 30, 2016 – August 16, 2017
- President: Rodrigo Duterte
- Preceded by: Corazon Soliman
- Succeeded by: Emmanuel Leyco (OIC)

Personal details
- Born: Judy Marigomen Taguiwalo; February 18, 1950 (age 76) Bacolod, Negros Occidental, Philippines
- Children: 1
- Education: University of the Philippines Diliman (BS, PhD); Carleton University (MA)
- Occupation: Professor; Government official
- Profession: Social worker

Judy Marigomen Taguiwalo (Tagalog pronunciation: [tɐgɪˈwalo], born February 18, 1950) is a Filipina social worker, social activist, and educator. She served as the Secretary of the Department of Social Welfare and Development under the Duterte administration in an ad interim basis from June 30, 2016 until August 16, 2017, when her appointment by President Rodrigo Duterte was rejected by the Commission on Appointments. She is a former professor at the University of the Philippines Diliman and was one of those nominated by the National Democratic Front to the Duterte Cabinet.

== Early life and education ==
Taguiwalo was born in Bacolod, Negros Occidental on February 17, 1950. Her father was the late Democrito Taguiwalo, a principal and a supervisor, and her mother is Virgilia M. Taguiwalo, a retired Home Economics teacher. She is a sister of the late Mario M. Taguiwalo, a former undersecretary of Department of Health. Taguiwalo studied at Rizal Elementary School and finished her Secondary education at Negros Occidental High School in Bacolod City. She obtained a Bachelor of Science in Social Work finishing cum laude from University of the Philippines Diliman in 1970. She obtained her Master of Arts in Public Administration in 1992 from Carleton University in Ottawa, Ontario, Canada and then finished her Doctor of Philosophy in Philippine Studies from UP Diliman. She has a daughter, June.

== Career ==
Taguiwalo helped in organizing the militant group Malayang Kilusan ng Kababaihan (MAKIBAKA) in 1970. After being detained twice, from July 1973 to their escape on November 1, 1974, and again on January 28, 1974, until their release after EDSA Revolution, she worked as a professor in the College of Social Work and Community Development's Department of Women and Development Studies in UP Diliman. Taguiwalo used to head the University for Women's and Gender Studies. She was Founding National President of All UP Academic Employee Union and a founder of All UP Workers' Alliance. Taguiwalo served as Director of UP Center for Women's Studies. She served as member of UP Board of Regents from 2009 to 2010 representing the faculty. She also served as Vice-Chairperson of Board of Trustees of IBON Foundation where she now serves as the Chairperson. She is a recipient of the 2009 Distinguished Alumni Award in Gender Equality/Women Empowerment, the 2010 CSWCD Outstanding Alumna Award, as well as the 2009 "Gawad Pagpupugay".

Political offices
Preceded by Corazon Soliman	Secretary of Social Welfare and Development; 2016–2017	Succeeded by Emmanuel Leyco; OIC
