= Ždánice (Kolín District) =

- Municipality
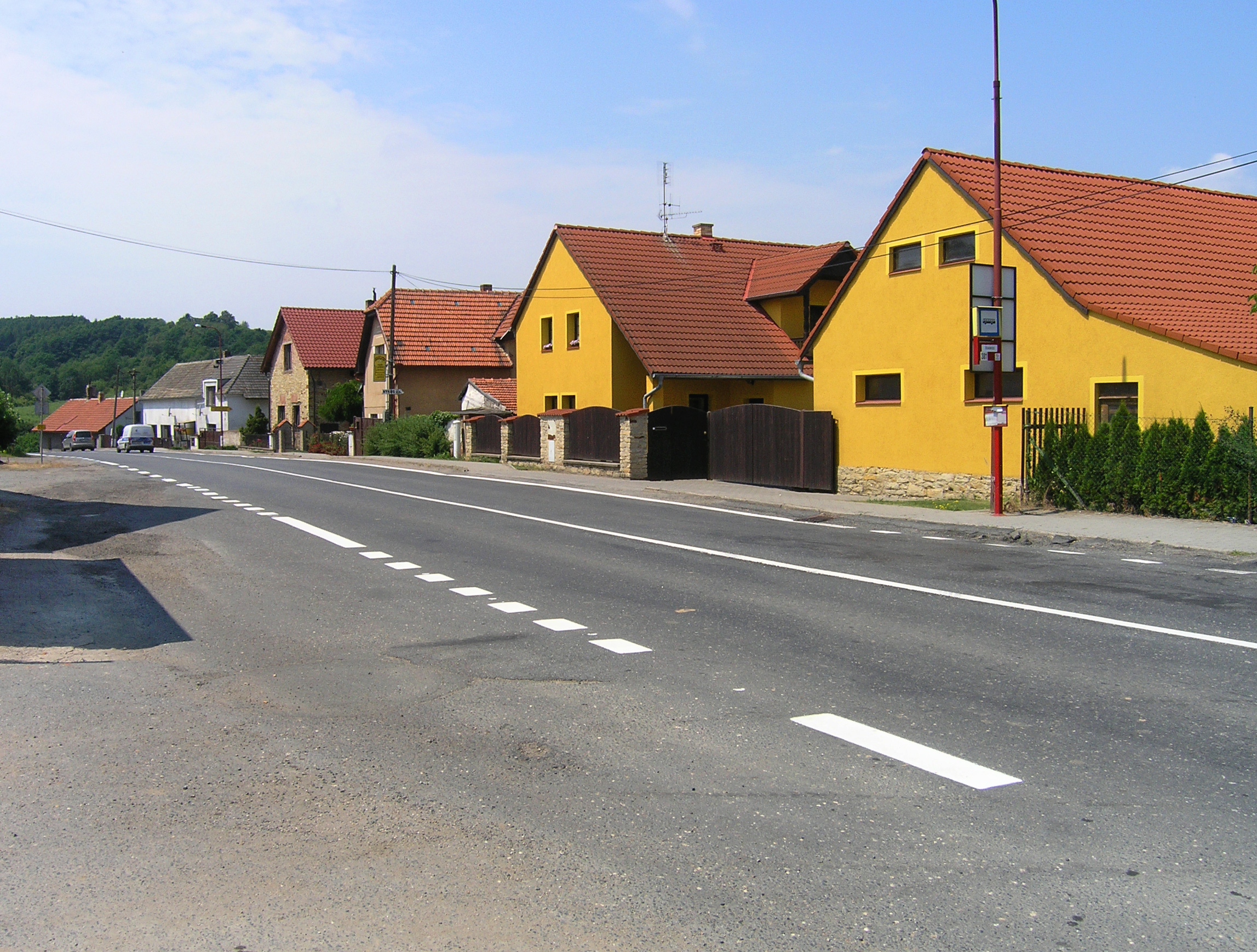
- Main street

- Location in the Czech Republic
- Coordinates: 49°58′10″N 14°57′33″E
- Country: Czech Republic
- Region: Central Bohemian
- District: Kolín
- First mentioned: 1305

Area
  - Total: 10.52 km^{2} (4.06 sq mi)
- Elevation: 319 m (1,047 ft)

Population (2026-01-01)
  - Total: 376
  - Density: 35.7/km^{2} (92.6/sq mi)
- Time zone: UTC+1 (CET)
  - Summer (DST): UTC+2 (CEST)
- Postal code: 281 63
- Website: zdanice.cz

Ždánice is a municipality and village in Kolín District in the Central Bohemian Region of the Czech Republic. It has about 400 inhabitants.

== Demographics ==
Historical population
Year	Pop.	±%
1869	572	—
1880	572	+0.0%
1890	639	+11.7%
1900	620	−3.0%
1910	606	−2.3%
1921	585	−3.5%
1930	568	−2.9%
1950	398	−29.9%
1961	419	+5.3%
1970	366	−12.6%
1980	348	−4.9%
1991	340	−2.3%
2001	304	−10.6%
2011	328	+7.9%
2021	351	+7.0%
Source: Censuses
