= P. V. Benjamin =

Indian physician

- Born: Kerala, India
- Awards: Padma Shri

Perakath Verghese Benjamin was an Indian physician and medical writer. Born in a Saint Thomas Christian family in the South Indian state of Kerala, Benjamin was a former Tuberculosis advisor to Government of India and a technical advisor to the Tuberculosis Association of India. He also served as the founder editor of the Indian Journal of Tuberculosis (IJT). He chronicled the efforts of the Indian Government in the fight against tuberculosis in the post independence era in a book, India's Fight Against Tuberculosis - 1956. The Government of India honoured him in 1955, with the Padma Shri, the fourth highest Indian civilian award for his contributions to the field of medicine. He was the first person from the state of Kerala to win this award.

== See also ==
- Tuberculosis in India
