= Dinky Soliman =

Filipino politician, activist, and social worker (1953–2021)

The Honorable Dinky Soliman
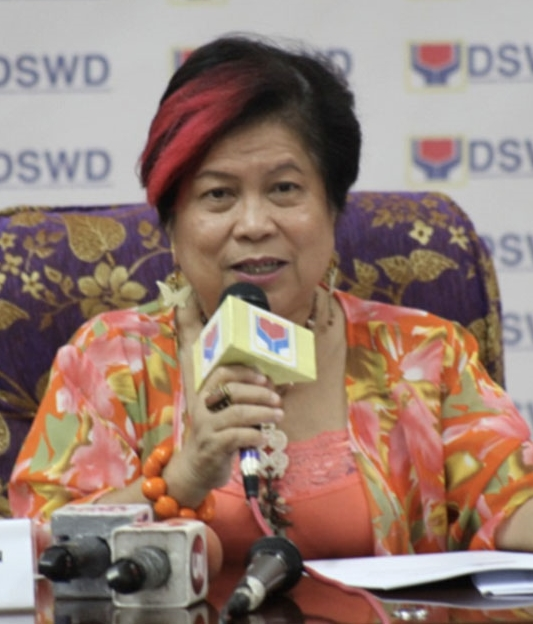
- Soliman in 2015

23rd and 26th Secretary of Social Welfare and Development
- In office June 30, 2010 – June 30, 2016
- President: Benigno S. Aquino III
- Preceded by: Celia Capadocia-Yangco
- Succeeded by: Judy Taguiwalo (Ad interim)
- In office January 20, 2001 – July 8, 2005
- President: Gloria Macapagal Arroyo
- Preceded by: Dulce Saguisag
- Succeeded by: Esperanza Cabral

Personal details
- Born: Corazón Victoria Nerves Juliano; January 27, 1953 Tarlac City, Philippines
- Died: September 19, 2021 (aged 68) Quezon City, Philippines
- Spouse: Hector Soliman
- Children: Sandino Soliman; Marikit Soliman
- Education: University of the Philippines Diliman; Harvard University
- Profession: Social worker

Corazon Victoria "Dinky" Nerves Juliano-Soliman (January 27, 1953 – September 19, 2021) was a Filipina politician, activist and social worker who served as Secretary of Social Welfare and Development twice, under President Gloria Macapagal Arroyo from 2001 to 2005, and President Benigno Aquino III from 2010 to 2016.

== Early life and education ==
Soliman was born on January 27, 1953, in Tarlac City, Philippines. After completing her secondary education at the College of the Holy Spirit of Tarlac, she attended University of the Philippines Diliman where she obtained her B.S. in Social Work and Master of Social Work degrees. She also attended the John F. Kennedy School of Government at Harvard University, where she earned her Master of Public Administration.

Prior to being in the government, Soliman has worked for several decades as an activist & social worker for various non-governmental organizations that aided poor communities.

== Career ==
In the aftermath of the 2001 EDSA revolution, Soliman was appointed by President Gloria Macapagal Arroyo, who was formerly Vice President, as the Department of Social Welfare and Development secretary for her new cabinet, Soliman held the position for four years but later resigned in 2005 in protest of the Hello Garci scandal, following allegations that Arroyo had cheated in the 2004 Philippine presidential election.

She was once again appointed in the same position and served again as the social welfare head under the administration of President Benigno Aquino III during his whole six-year term as president. During her tenure as the social welfare secretary under the Aquino administration, she bolstered the implementation of the Pantawid Pamilyang Pilipino Program and also chaired Aquino's cabinet group on Human Development and Poverty Reduction.

On June 28, 2012, Soliman initiated anti-poverty programs and inaugurated the construction of a new daycare center and a concrete road for the residents of Donsol, Sorsogon. On November 14, 2012, Soliman held charitable activities including a Family Camp for families living in the streets in Metro Manila.

From 2013, Soliman notably led the Typhoon Haiyan relief efforts at Tacloban alongside Interior Secretary Mar Roxas until the tail end of her term. On 2014, Soliman was criticized because some food packs in the typhoon relief that were lost to spoilage due to "improper handling" were still distributed to evacuees of Mayon Volcano's renewed activity, in a fault she admitted. It led to several groups urging her to resign for being "inefficient" including Senator Miriam Defensor-Santiago who tried to prevent her confirmation as the secretary of welfare and called her "dangerous" because of being previously allied to former President Arroyo.

In May 2015, Soliman was among the awardees of the World Bank's award for leadership in social accountability in a ceremony held in Washington, D.C.

== Illness and death ==
By June 2021, Soliman was seen in public and noticeably lost weight when she paid her tributes to President Benigno Aquino III in his wake and funeral that marked her last public appearance.

In August 2021, Soliman, her husband Hector and thirteen other family members contracted COVID-19. However, at the age of 68, Soliman died on September 19, 2021, after succumbing to renal and heart failure, as well as COVID-19. Her death was confirmed in a statement announced by Vice President Leni Robredo.

Government offices
Preceded by Celia Capadocia-Yangco	Secretary of Social Welfare and Development; 2010–2016	Succeeded by Judy Taguiwalo (Ad interim)
Preceded by Dulce Saguisag	Secretary of Social Welfare and Development; 2001–2005	Succeeded by Esperanza Cabral
