= Vilémov (Havlíčkův Brod District) =

- Market town
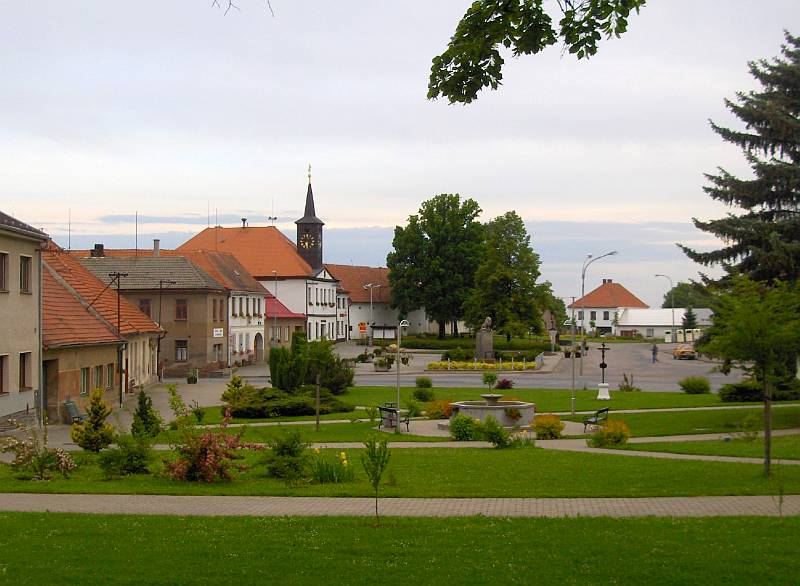
- Town square

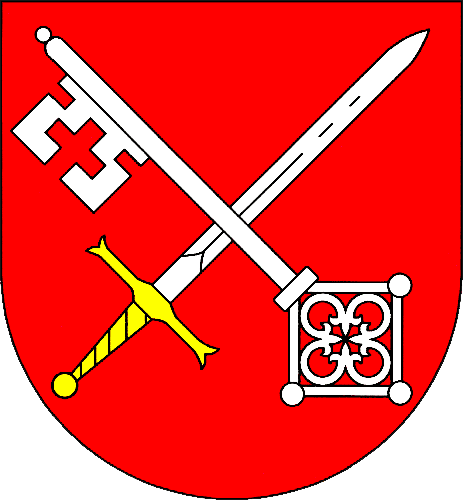
- Flag Coat of arms

- Location in the Czech Republic
- Coordinates: 49°48′57″N 15°32′9″E
- Country: Czech Republic
- Region: Vysočina
- District: Havlíčkův Brod
- Founded: 1119

Area
  - Total: 24.57 km^{2} (9.49 sq mi)
- Elevation: 358 m (1,175 ft)

Population (2026-01-01)
  - Total: 985
  - Density: 40.1/km^{2} (104/sq mi)
- Time zone: UTC+1 (CET)
  - Summer (DST): UTC+2 (CEST)
- Postal codes: 582 82, 582 83
- Website: www.vilemov.info

Vilémov (Czech pronunciation: [ˈvɪlɛːmof]) is a market town in Havlíčkův Brod District in the Vysočina Region of the Czech Republic. It has about 1,000 inhabitants.

== Administrative division ==
Vilémov consists of nine municipal parts (in brackets population according to the 2021 census):

- Vilémov (552)
- Dálčice (32)
- Hostovlice (48)
- Jakubovice (15)
- Klášter (195)
- Košťany (5)
- Spytice (60)
- Ždánice (22)
- Zhoř (2)

== Etymology ==
The name is derived from Abbot Vilém, who was one of the founders of Vilémov.

== Geography ==
Vilémov is located about 23 kilometres (14 mi) north of Havlíčkův Brod and 45 km (28 mi) north of Jihlava. It lies in the Upper Sázava Hills. The highest point is a hill at 464 m (1,522 ft) above sea level. The market town is situated on the Hostačovka Stream. The Doubravka Stream, a tributary of the Hostačovka, forms the eastern municipal border.

== History ==
Vilémov was founded by the Benedictines in 1119 and consisted of a monastery complex and a fortified settlement. The monastery was burned down by the troops of King Rudolf I of Germany in 1278, and conquered by the Hussites in 1421. The monks then fled to Uherčice and the convent was never restored here.

In 1469, armies of Matthias Corvinus and George of Poděbrady clashed near Vilémov in the Battle of Vilémov during the Bohemian–Hungarian War.

In 1578, a fortress was built on the foundations of the monastery buildings. A hundred years later, it was rebuilt into a Renaissance castle. In 1684, Vilémov was bought by Count Caretto de Millessimo. He and his family had rebuilt the castle in the Baroque style. They owned the castle until 1852. From 1852 until the confiscation during World War II, it was owned by the Rajský of Dubnice family.

In 1747, Maria Theresa promoted Vilémov to a market town. In 2006, Vilémov has restored the market town status.

== Demographics ==
Historical population

Year	Pop.	±%
1869	2,753	—
1880	2,765	+0.4%
1890	2,437	−11.9%
1900	2,253	−7.6%
1910	2,296	+1.9%

Year	Pop.	±%
1921	2,296	+0.0%
1930	2,227	−3.0%
1950	1,654	−25.7%
1961	1,682	+1.7%
1970	1,498	−10.9%

Year	Pop.	±%
1980	1,384	−7.6%
1991	1,138	−17.8%
2001	1,076	−5.4%
2011	984	−8.6%
2021	931	−5.4%

Source: Censuses

== Transport ==
There are no railways or major roads passing through the municipality.

== Sights ==
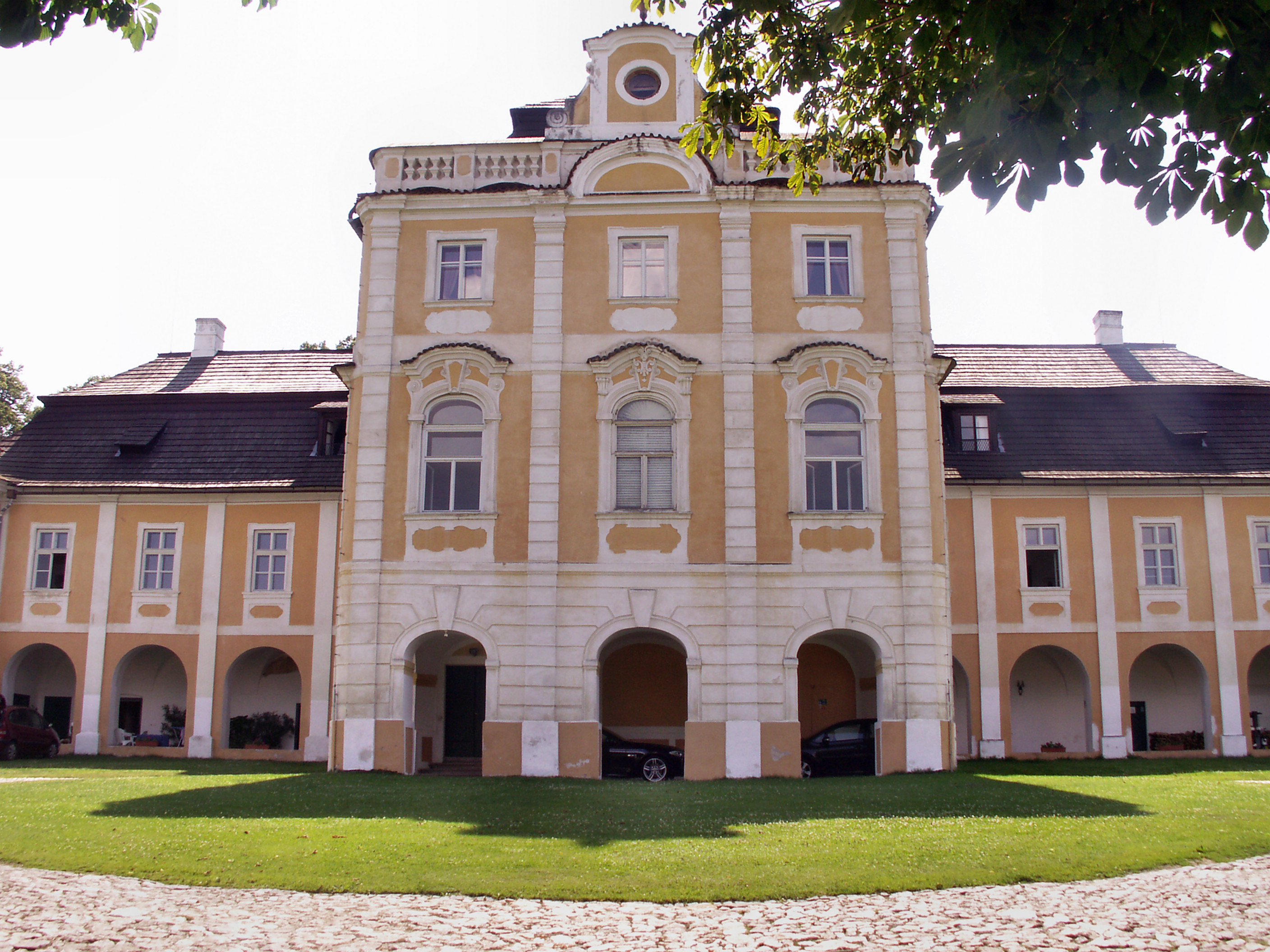
Klášter Castle

Klášter Castle was returned to the Rajský of Dubnice family in 1991 and is in private ownership since then. The dilapidated building has been renovated by the family and now serves as a hotel and restaurant.

The Church of Saint Wenceslaus dates was built in the Baroque style in 1726. Its predecessor was a Gothic church consecrated to the Virgin Mary, which served as a parish church of the monastery.

== Notable people ==
- Stanislav Vydra (1741–1804), priest, writer and mathematician; worked here
- Karel Styblo (1921–1998), Czech-Dutch medical doctor
