= Ždánice (Žďár nad Sázavou District) =

- Municipality
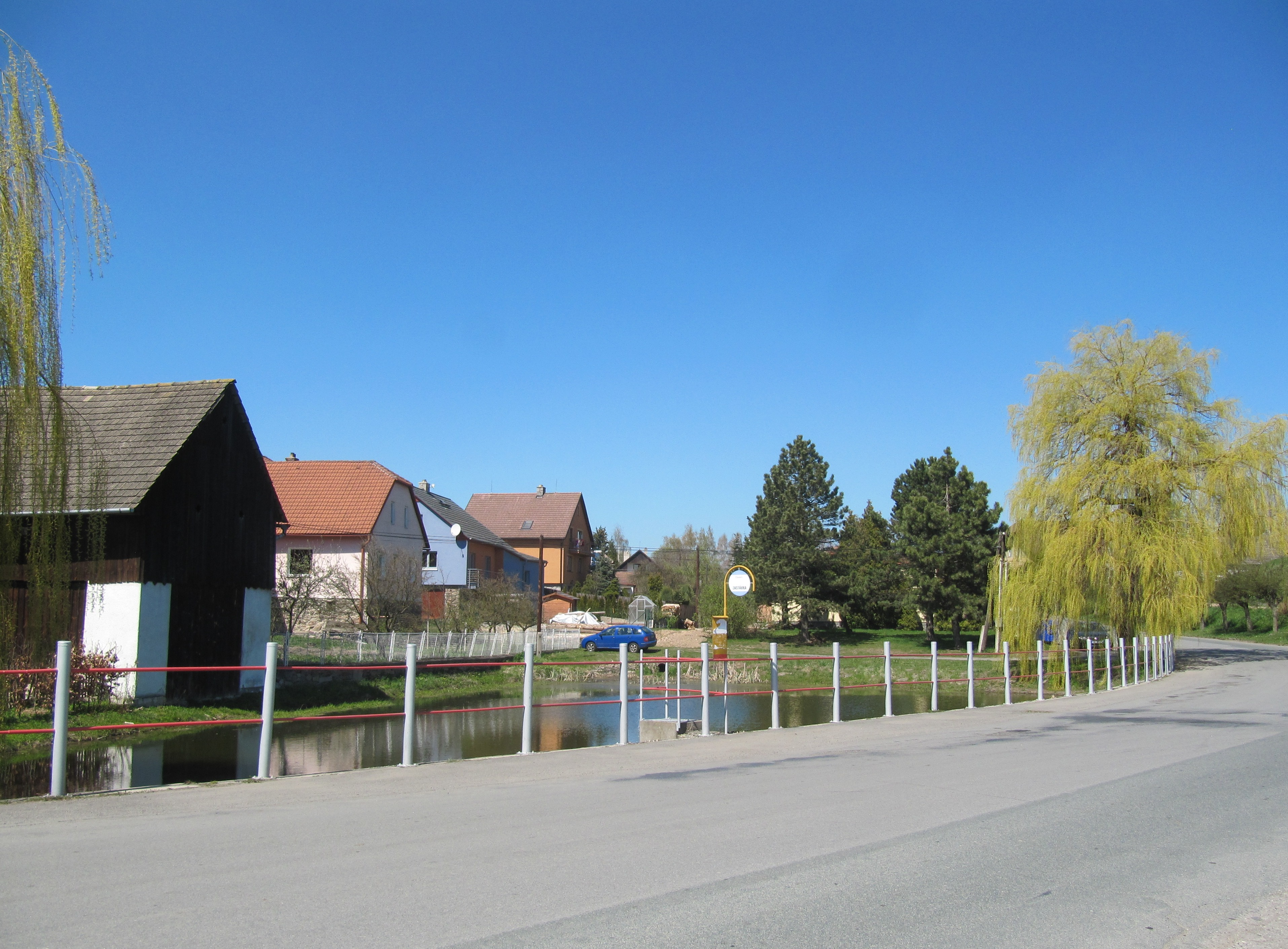
- Centre of Ždánice

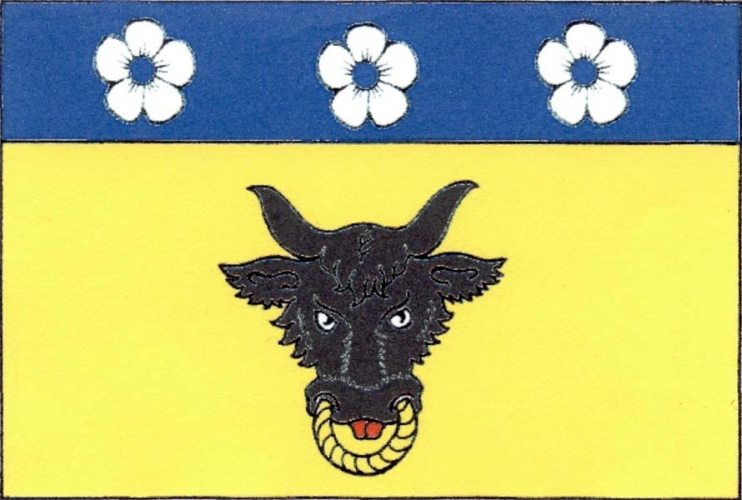
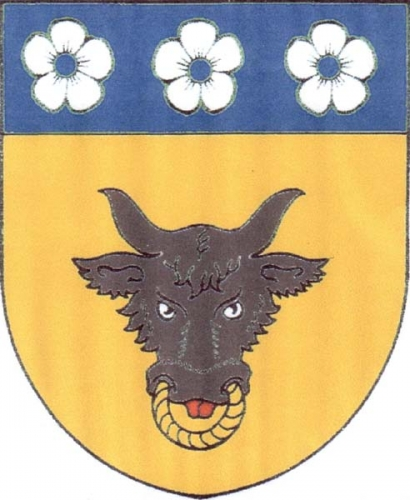
- Flag Coat of arms

- Location in the Czech Republic
- Coordinates: 49°32′51″N 16°15′44″E
- Country: Czech Republic
- Region: Vysočina
- District: Žďár nad Sázavou
- First mentioned: 1287

Area
  - Total: 4.42 km^{2} (1.71 sq mi)
- Elevation: 618 m (2,028 ft)

Population (2026-01-01)
  - Total: 234
  - Density: 52.9/km^{2} (137/sq mi)
- Time zone: UTC+1 (CET)
  - Summer (DST): UTC+2 (CEST)
- Postal code: 593 01
- Website: www.obeczdanice.cz

Ždánice is a municipality and village in Žďár nad Sázavou District in the Vysočina Region of the Czech Republic. It has about 200 inhabitants.

Ždánice lies approximately 24 kilometres (15 mi) east of Žďár nad Sázavou, 52 km (32 mi) east of Jihlava, and 146 km (91 mi) south-east of Prague.

== Demographics ==
Historical population
Year	Pop.	±%
1869	297	—
1880	263	−11.4%
1890	277	+5.3%
1900	284	+2.5%
1910	245	−13.7%
1921	198	−19.2%
1930	243	+22.7%
1950	215	−11.5%
1961	224	+4.2%
1970	207	−7.6%
1980	186	−10.1%
1991	187	+0.5%
2001	187	+0.0%
2011	181	−3.2%
2021	231	+27.6%
Source: Censuses
