= Dulce Saguisag =

Filipino politician (1943–2007)

Dulce Q. Saguisag
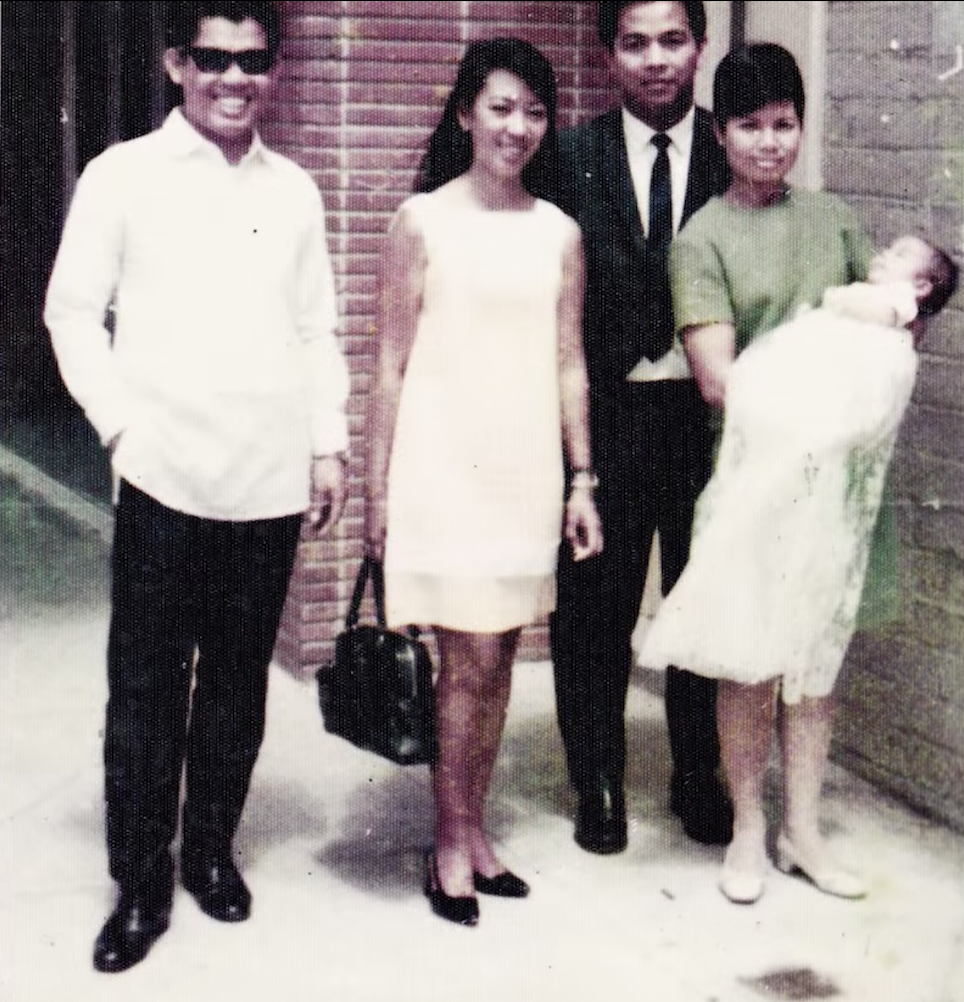
- Dulce Q. Saguisag (second from left) with her husband Rene Saguisag (left)

22nd Secretary of Social Welfare and Development
- In office October 12, 2000 – January 19, 2001
- President: Joseph Estrada
- Preceded by: Gloria Macapagal Arroyo
- Succeeded by: Corazon Soliman

Personal details
- Born: Dulce Maramba Quintans; September 5, 1944 Commonwealth of the Philippines
- Died: November 8, 2007 (aged 63) Makati, Philippines
- Spouse: Rene Saguisag (m. 1970)
- Children: 5
- Education: University of the Philippines Diliman (BS); Boston College (MSW)

Dulce Maramba Quintans-Saguisag (September 5, 1944 – November 8, 2007) was a Filipino politician and former Secretary of the Department of Social Welfare and Development under the administration of former President Joseph Estrada. Saguisag was one of Estrada's eleven cabinet members who withdrew support for Estrada on January 19, 2001, following accusations of massive corruption by the president. Estrada was ousted from office the next day, which is now known in the Philippines as EDSA II.

She also served as the secretary-general of the Gymnastics Association of the Philippines. Saguisag was the wife of a former Filipino Senator Rene Saguisag, who was in office from 1987 to 1992.

== Early life ==
Dulce Saguisag was born Dulce Maramba Quintans on September 5, 1944. She is a descendant of Senator Daniel Maramba from Pangasinan. She received a bachelor's degree in social work from the University of the Philippines Diliman and placed third in the country in the 1964 National Board Examination for Social Workers.

She initially began her career as in 1964 at the Social Welfare Administration, which is now called the Department of Social Welfare and Development. She held a position of senior social worker at the SWA until 1965, when she became a supervising social worker and community center director.

Saguisag left the Philippines for the United States in 1967 after winning a grant by the US State Department to observe social work in the country. She was also recruited by the John F. Kennedy War on Poverty program while in the United States.

Saguisag won a scholarship to Boston College where she received a master's degree in social work, with an emphasis on community organization and social planning, in 1969.

She met her future husband, Rene Saguisag, a student at Harvard Law School, while studying at Boston College. The couple had two daughters and three sons during their marriage. Her hobbies included collecting angel and Santa Claus figurines and ballroom dancing with her husband.

== Career ==
Upon receiving her master's degree, Saguisag returned to the Philippines. She took a job with the Department of Social Welfare and Development in 1971. She worked as a social welfare program specialist at the department before being promoted to assistant director of the Bureau of Family and Child Welfare.

She left her position with the bureau in order to become dual director of human resources development and director of management training at the Development Academy of the Philippines in 1976.

Saguisag once again left to take a new position, this time for an organization outside of the Filipino government. In 1984, she took a job with the Mondragon International Philippines, Inc. as a manager for human resource development. She stayed with the company until 1999. She was serving as Mondragon's vice chairperson and deputy chief executive officer at the time of her departure.

== Secretary of the Department of Social Welfare and Development ==
Dulce Saguisag was appointed Secretary of the Department of Social Welfare and Development (DSWD) by President Joseph Estrada in October 2000. Her appointment to Secretary of the DSWD followed the resignation of then Vice President and DSWD Secretary Gloria Macapagal Arroyo. Arroyo had left the Estrada administration over the jueteng scandal which had plagued Estrada during his term. Saguisag accepted the Secretary position despite the objections of her husband, Rene Saguisag. He worried that the cabinet position would be too stressful to his wife, who had undergone successful breast cancer surgery in 1997.

Saguisag became one of eleven of Estrada's cabinet members who withdrew support for the embattled President on January 19, 2001. Her decision to withdraw her support for the President came after allegations of massive government corruption against Estrada. Estrada was ousted from office the next day on January 20, 2001, which is now known as EDSA II in the Philippines. (Dulce Saguisag's husband, Rene Saguisag, later became Estrada's defense lawyer.)

== Death ==
Dulce Saguisag was killed in a serious car accident on November 8, 2007, on Osmeña Highway in Makati, while on their way home to Palanan from one of their usual late-night ballroom dancing sessions at Byke's Cafe along Chino Roces Avenue. Her husband, Rene Saguisag, was seriously injured in the accident. Two other people riding in the same Toyota Grandia van as the Saguisags, including Filipino dance instructor, Rhea Imelda Obong, and driver, Felipe Calvario, were also seriously injured in the accident. All four were rushed to Ospital ng Makati 2 in Bel-Air, where Dulce Saguisag was pronounced dead from her injuries.

The Toyota that Ducle Saguisag was riding in, which was travelling on Pasay Road, was struck by a dump truck at the corner of the Osmeña Highway in Makati at about 2 A.M. The dump truck had reportedly been speeding when it ran a traffic light and struck the left side of the Saguisags' van, killing Dulce. Police arrested the driver of the dump truck at the scene of the accident.

Dulce Saguisag's funeral was held on November 16, 2007. The service began with a two-hour Roman Catholic mass at the chapel of St. Scholastica’s College in Manila, which Saguisag had attended. The funeral procession then passed Saguisag's "ancestral home" on Bigasan Street in Makati. Dulce Saguisag was buried in the Garden of Reverence section of the Manila Memorial Park cemetery in Parañaque.

Three hundred people attended her funeral. Prominent mourners included former Filipino Presidents Corazon Aquino and Joseph Estrada, Vice President Noli de Castro, San Juan Mayor JV Ejercito, and Gina de Venecia, the wife of the Speaker of the Philippine House of Representatives Jose de Venecia.

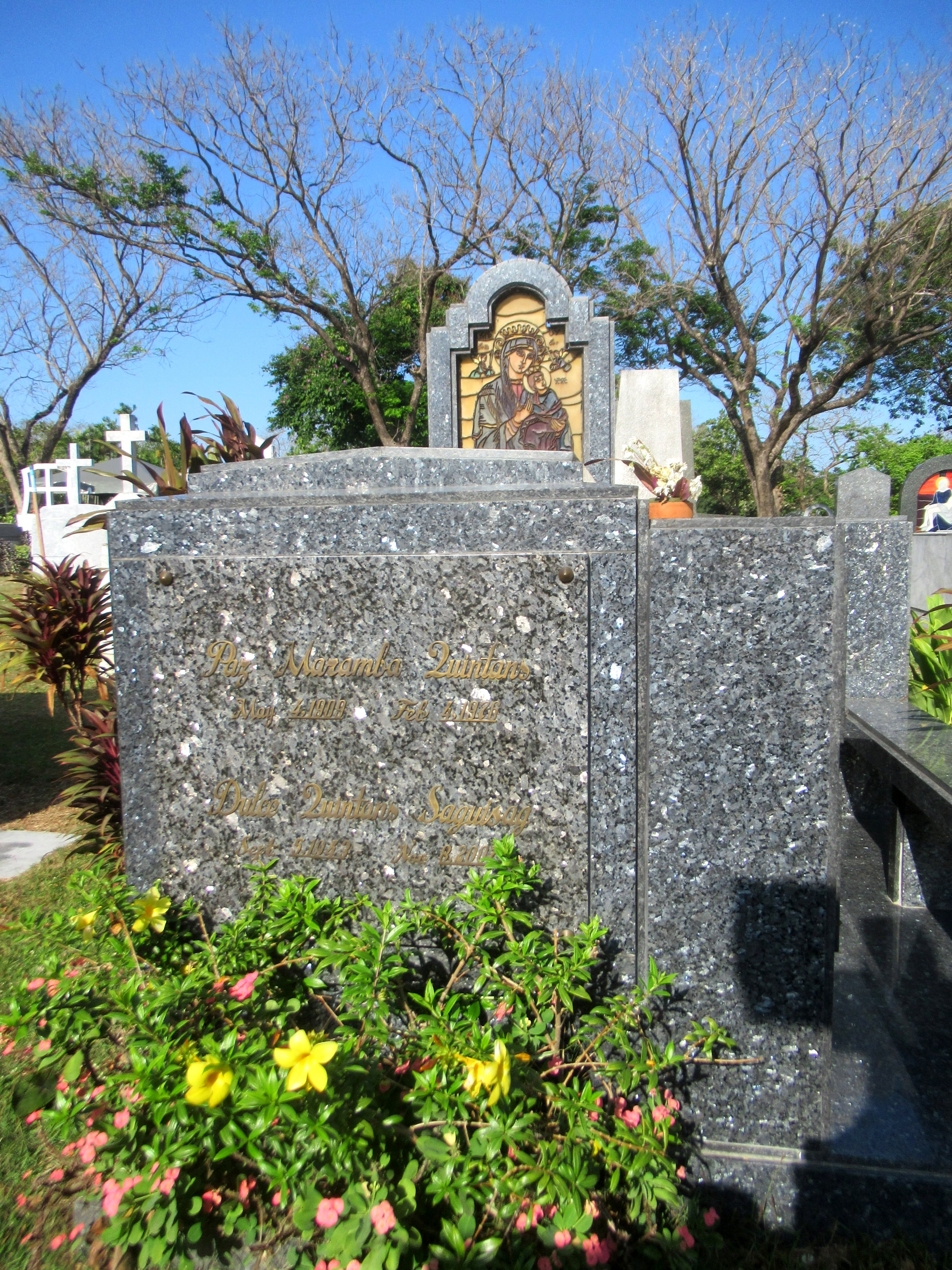
Paz Maramba Quintans & Saguisag's grave at Manila Memorial Park – Sucat.

Senator Rene Saguisag was out of the ICU on November 28, or 20 days from the fatal accident. After a month, on December 8, 2007, he was released from the hospital, and needed some assistance to perform some tasks. He had lost weight. Their youngest daughter 16-year-old gymnast Kaissa Saguisag's knee injury ended her quest for gold at the 24th Southeast Asian Games.

Government offices
Preceded by Gloria Macapagal Arroyo	Secretary of Social Welfare and Development; 2000–2001	Succeeded by Dinky Soliman
