= Staré Ždánice =

- Municipality
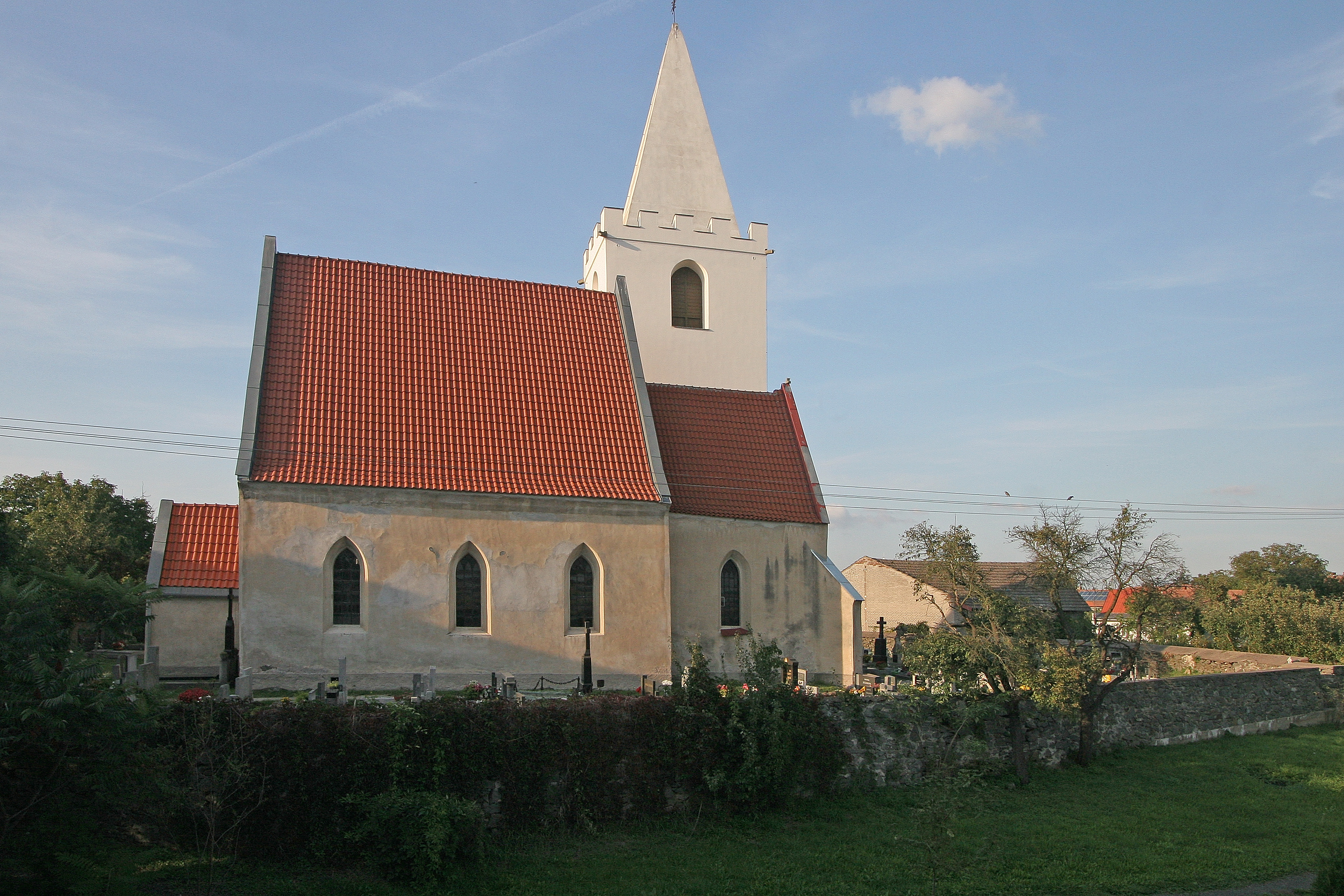
- Church of Saint Wenceslaus

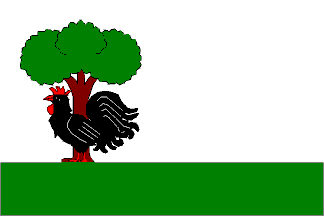
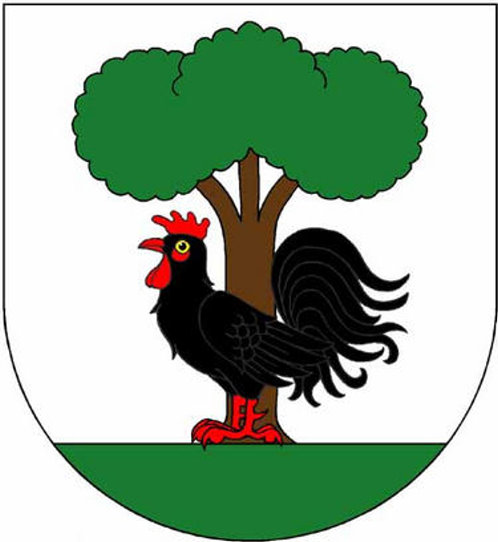
- Flag Coat of arms

- Location in the Czech Republic
- Coordinates: 50°7′26″N 15°43′15″E
- Country: Czech Republic
- Region: Pardubice
- District: Pardubice
- First mentioned: 1339

Area
  - Total: 5.74 km^{2} (2.22 sq mi)
- Elevation: 224 m (735 ft)

Population (2026-01-01)
  - Total: 719
  - Density: 125/km^{2} (324/sq mi)
- Time zone: UTC+1 (CET)
  - Summer (DST): UTC+2 (CEST)
- Postal code: 533 44
- Website: www.starezdanice.cz

Staré Ždánice is a municipality and village in Pardubice District in the Pardubice Region of the Czech Republic. It has about 700 inhabitants.

== Demographics ==
Historical population
Year	Pop.	±%
1869	804	—
1880	913	+13.6%
1890	947	+3.7%
1900	846	−10.7%
1910	805	−4.8%
1921	740	−8.1%
1930	734	−0.8%
1950	647	−11.9%
1961	666	+2.9%
1970	622	−6.6%
1980	635	+2.1%
1991	583	−8.2%
2001	583	+0.0%
2011	673	+15.4%
2021	648	−3.7%
Source: Censuses
