= Secretary of Social Welfare and Development =

Philippine cabinet minister

- Kalihim ng Kagalingang Panlipunan at Pagpapaunlad
- Official seal of the Department of Social Welfare and Development

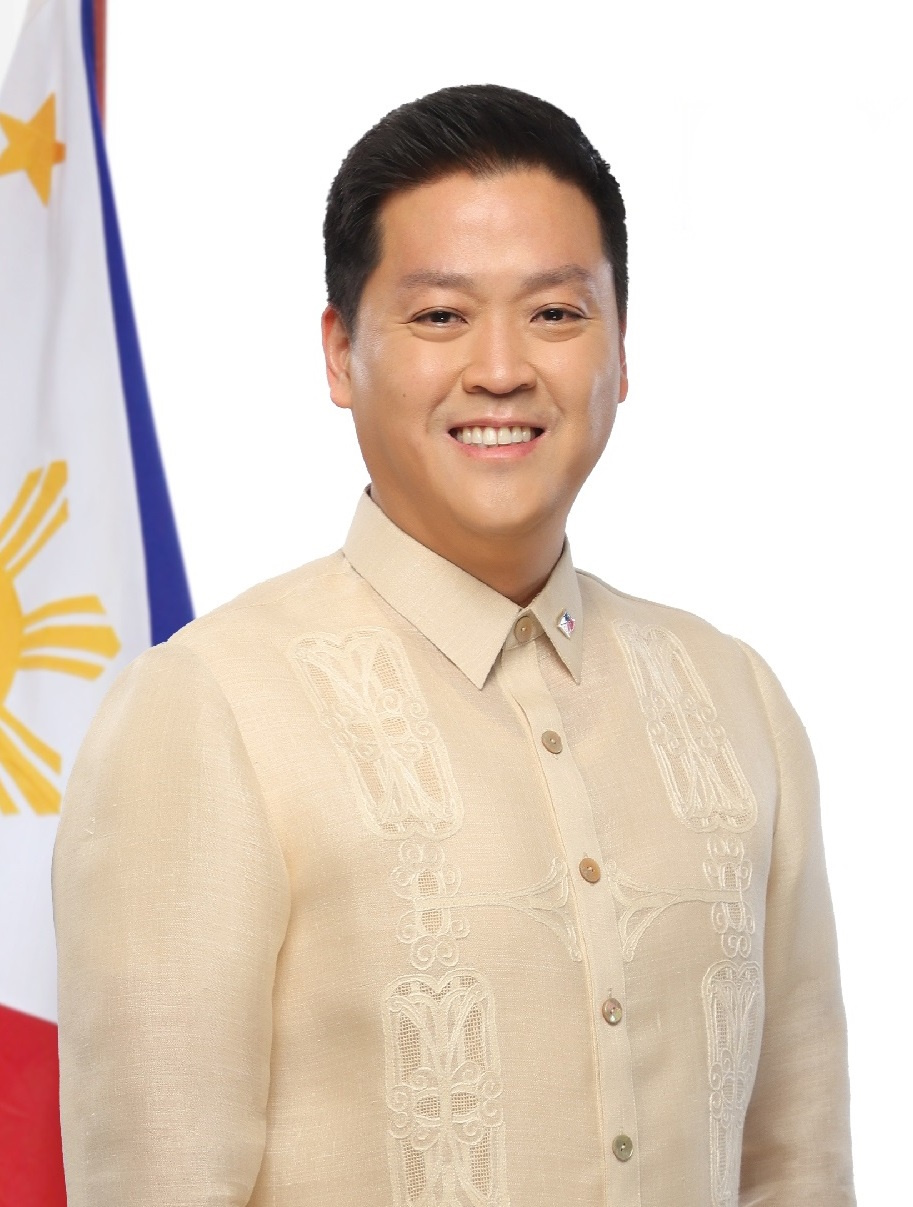
- Incumbent; Rex Gatchalian since January 13, 2023
- Style: The Honourable
- Member of: Cabinet
- Appointer: The president with the consent of the Commission on Appointments
- Term length: No fixed term
- Inaugural holder: Gracio Gonzaga
- Formation: January 21, 1899 (127 years ago)
- Website: www.dswd.gov.ph

The secretary of social welfare and development (Filipino: Kalihim ng Kagalingang Panlipunan at Pagpapaunlad) is the head of the Department of Social Welfare and Development and is a member of the President's Cabinet.

== List of secretaries of social welfare and development ==
Portrait	Name (Birth–Death)	Took office	Left office	President
	Gracio Gonzaga	January 21, 1899	May 7, 1899	Emilio Aguinaldo

=== Secretary of Public Instruction, Health, and Public Welfare (1941–1944) ===
Portrait	Name (Birth–Death)	Took office	Left office	President
	Sergio Osmeña (1878–1961)	December 24, 1941	August 1, 1944	Manuel L. Quezon

=== Commissioner of Education, Health and Welfare (1942–1943) ===
Portrait	Name (Birth–Death)	Took office	Left office	Chairman of the Philippine Executive Commission
	Claro M. Recto (1890–1960)	January 26, 1942	October 14, 1943	Jorge B. Vargas

=== Minister of Education, Health and Welfare (1943–1944) ===
Portrait	Name (Birth–Death)	Took office	Left office	President
	Gabriel Mañalac; Acting	October 20, 1943	January 1, 1944	Jose P. Laurel

=== Minister of Health, Labor and Public Welfare (1944–1945) ===
Portrait	Name (Birth–Death)	Took office	Left office	President
	Emiliano Tría Tirona (1883–1952)	January 4, 1944	1945	Jose P. Laurel

=== Secretary of Health and Public Welfare (1945–1947) ===
Portrait	Name (Birth–Death)	Took office	Left office	President
	Basilio Valdes (1892–1970)	February 27, 1945	April; 1945	Sergio Osmeña
	Jose Locsin (1891–1977)	June 29, 1945	May 27, 1946	Sergio Osmeña
	Antonio Villarama	May 28, 1946	October 4, 1947	Manuel Roxas

=== Secretary of Social Welfare (1950–1976) ===
Portrait	Name (Birth–Death)	Took office	Left office	President
	Asuncion Perez (1895-1967)	1950	1953	Elpidio Quirino
	Pacita Madrigal-Warns (1915–2008)	1950	1953	Elpidio Quirino
	Amparo Villamor	1960	1961	Carlos P. Garcia
	Tecla San Andres Ziga (1906–1992)	1962	1963	Diosdado Macapagal
	Jose O. Pelayo	1963	1965	Diosdado Macapagal
	Francisco Remotigue (1908–1995)	1966	1967	Ferdinand Marcos
	Gregorio Feliciano	June 15, 1968	April 11, 1971	Ferdinand Marcos
	Estefania Aldaba-Lim (1917–2006)	April 11, 1971	September 8, 1976	Ferdinand Marcos

=== Secretary of Social Services and Development (1976–1978) ===
Portrait	Name (Birth–Death)	Took office	Left office	President
	Estefania Aldaba-Lim (1917–2006)	September 8, 1976	November 30, 1977	Ferdinand Marcos
	Nathaniel Tablante	December 1, 1977	March 28, 1978	Ferdinand Marcos
	Sylvia Montes	March 28, 1978	June 2, 1978	Ferdinand Marcos

=== Minister of Social Services and Development (1976–1987) ===
Portrait	Name (Birth–Death)	Took office	Left office	President
	Sylvia Montes	June 2, 1978	February 25, 1986	Ferdinand Marcos
	Mita Pardo de Tavera (1919–2007)	February 25, 1986	January 30, 1987	Corazon Aquino

=== Minister of Social Welfare and Development (1987) ===
Portrait	Name (Birth–Death)	Took office	Left office	President
	Mita Pardo de Tavera (1919–2007)	January 30, 1987	February 11, 1987	Corazon Aquino

=== Secretary of Social Welfare and Development (since 1987) ===
Portrait	Name (Birth–Death)	Took office	Left office	President
	Mita Pardo de Tavera (1919–2007)	February 11, 1987	June 30, 1992	Corazon Aquino
	Corazon Alma de Leon	June 30, 1992	June 30, 1995	Fidel V. Ramos
	Lina Laigo	June 30, 1995	June 30, 1998	Fidel V. Ramos
	Gloria Macapagal Arroyo (Note: In concurrent capacity as the Vice President.) (born 1947)	June 30, 1998	October 12, 2000	Joseph Estrada
	Dulce Saguisag (1943–2007)	October 12, 2000	January 19, 2001	Joseph Estrada
	Dinky Soliman (1953–2021)	January 20, 2001	July 8, 2005	Gloria Macapagal Arroyo
	Luwalhati Pablo; Acting	July 8, 2005	July 20, 2005	Gloria Macapagal Arroyo
	Esperanza Cabral	July 21, 2005	August 31, 2009	Gloria Macapagal Arroyo
	Celia Yangco	September 1, 2009	June 30, 2010	Gloria Macapagal Arroyo
	Dinky Soliman (1953–2021)	June 30, 2010	June 30, 2016	Benigno Aquino III
	Judy Taguiwalo (born 1950); Interim	June 30, 2016	August 16, 2017	Rodrigo Duterte
	Emmanuel Leyco; Officer in Charge	August 19, 2017	May 9, 2018	Rodrigo Duterte
	Virginia Orogo; Acting	May 10, 2018	October 16, 2018	Rodrigo Duterte
	Rolando Joselito Bautista (born 1962)	October 17, 2018	June 30, 2022	Rodrigo Duterte
	Erwin Tulfo (born 1962)	June 30, 2022	December 27, 2022	Bongbong Marcos
	Eduardo Punay; Officer in Charge	December 27, 2022	January 31, 2023	Bongbong Marcos
	Rex Gatchalian (born 1979)	January 31, 2023	Incumbent	Bongbong Marcos
