= Maisara Dandamun-Latiph =

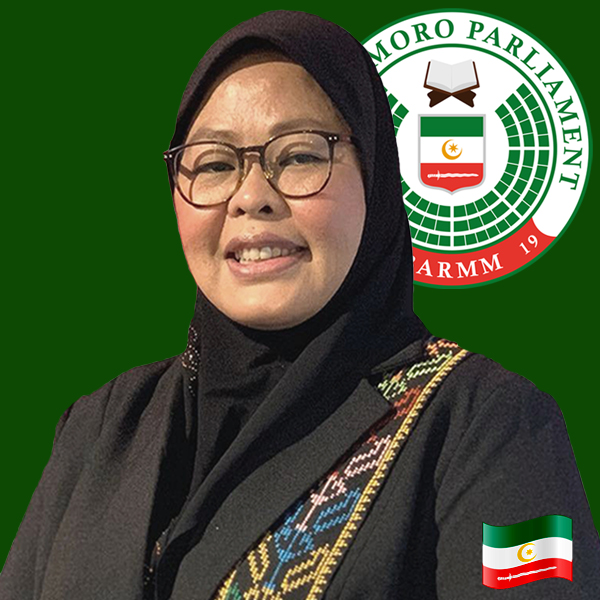

Commissioner of the Bangsamoro Transition Commission
- In office February 14, 2017 – February 22, 2019
- Nominated by: Government of the Philippines for Women Sector
- Appointed by: Rodrigo Duterte
- Chairman: Ghadzali Jaafar

Member of the Bangsamoro Transition Authority Parliament
- In office February 22, 2019 – August 12, 2022
- Nominated by: Government of the Philippines for Women Sector
- Appointed by: Rodrigo Duterte
- Chief Minister: Murad Ebrahim

Chairperson of the Marawi Compensation Board
- In office January 30, 2023 – March 26, 2025
- Appointed by: Bongbong Marcos
- Preceded by: Office established
- Succeeded by: Moslemen Macarambon Sr.

Personal details
- Born: Maisara Cudia Dandamun
- Spouse: Algamar Latiph
- Children: 2
- Education: University of the Philippines (BA Public Administration) , San Beda University (LLB, Jurisdoctor), Manchester University (Master in Education), National Defense College of the Philippines (Master in National Security Administration)

Maisara Cudia Dandamun-Latiph is a Filipina lawyer, educator, legislator, and former government official.

She served as first chairperson and CEO of Marawi Compensation Board from 2023 to 2025 leading the independent quasi-judicial agency. In this role she held a rank equivalent to Cabinet Secretary and Presiding Justice of the Court of Appeals under R.A. 11696.

Dandamun-Latiph helped in the draft, passage and ratification of Bangsamoro Organic Law (BOL) as Commissioner of Bangsamoro Transition Commission from 2017 to 2019, before becoming a Member of Parliament of the Bangsamoro Parliament from 2019 to 2022 of the Bangsamoro which arose from the BOL.

She was a principal co-author of the law which created the Bangsamoro Women Commission in the BTA Parliament.

She worked as a Senior State Solicitor at the Office of Solicitor General from 2002-2017, representing the government in the Supreme Court, Court of Appeals, Court of Tax Appeals, lower and quasi-judicial courts.

On August 17, 2026, she was unanimously elected by members of the Association of Former Members of Parliament of BTA Parliament as its founding President together with other members of Executive Committee. The AFMP is created by Parliament Resolution No. 562 to provide former parliamentarians with formal platform to continue contributing to governance, community engagements and civic initatives.

== Career ==
=== Early years ===
Dandamun-Latiph and her Muslim women friends co-founded IQRA Kiddie Learning Center, an educational institution in Quiapo, Manila. In 2014, she and her sister co-founded Safia Learning Center, a community preschool in Quezon City, further expanding her work in Muslim community education. She also co-founded Khadija Center for Muslim Women Studies dedicated to promote and advocate rights and issues of Muslim women in Metro-Manila.

=== Office of the Solicitor General ===
Dandamun-Latiph was a former senior state solicitor at the Office of the Solicitor General (OSG). She received an award for excellence in client service in 2008 as well as recognition for her Chevening Scholarship Award.

=== Bangsamoro Transition Commission ===
Dandamun-Latiph was named one of the commissioners of the Bangsamoro Transition Commission (BTC) in 2017 by President Rodrigo Duterte. The BTC was tasked to make the draft of the law that eventually became known as the Bangsamoro Organic Law, the charter of the Bangsamoro autonomous region established in 2019.

Dandamun-Latiph advocated women's representation in the then-proposed autonomous region. At the 2nd Bangsamoro Women Economic and Development Summit in 2018, she pledged the establishment of a Bangsamoro Women Commission to promote women's rights in the region and that the proposed Bangsamoro region should guarantee 50 percent of the available government positions to women.

=== Bangsamoro Parliament ===
Following the establishment of the new Bangsamoro region, Dandamun-Latiph was appointed as a Member of Parliament representing the women sector in the 1st Bangsamoro Transition Authority Parliament. A nominee of the Philippine national government, she took oath as a member on February 22, 2019. The parliament first convened the following month.

She was principal co-author of the law creating the Bangsamoro Women's Commission, fulfilling the pledge she had made during the BTC period.

She also authored and co-authored numerous bills and resolutions, including those concerning:

- An Act Adopting an Official Flag of the BARMM
- An Act Adopting an Official Bangsamoro Emblem
- An Act Creating the Attorney General's Office
- An Act Promoting the Development of Sports in the Bangsamoro (Bangsamoro Sports Commission)
- An Act Creating and Establishing the Bangsamoro Youth Commission.
- Bangsamoro Education Code
- Bangsamoro Administrative Code
- Bangsamoro Civil Service Code

=== Marawi Compensation Board ===
On January 30, 2023, Dandamun-Latiph took oath as the first chairperson of the Marawi Compensation Board (MCB) after her appointment by President Bongbong Marcos. The body established by law under R.A. 11696 also known as "Marawi Siege Victims Compensation Act of 2022" is tasked to facilitate the reparations of people affected by the Marawi siege of 2017. She openly engaged with Marawi IDPs and residents that are skeptical of the government due to delayed efforts to reconstruct houses destroyed by the battle in Marawi.

Under her leadership the MCB paid the amount of Php 1,443,712,772.10 to 848 claimants out of the approximately Php 2,393,189,880.87 approved for over 1,391 claimants. The MCB targets to process the claims of 14,495 individuals by 2028 when the board will be dissolved. She left the role on March 24, 2025, with Moslemen Macarambon Sr. succeeding her.

In a 2026 think piece for the Ateneo Bangsamoro Initiative of the Ateneo School of Government, former Marawi Compensation Board (MCB) chairperson Maisara Dandamun-Latiph described compensation under the Marawi Siege Victims Compensation Act of 2022 (Republic Act No. 11696) as a transitional justice mechanism and an obligation of the state under international human rights and humanitarian law, rather than an act of generosity. She wrote that the nine-member board, sworn in on 30 January 2023, started with no budget, office or staff. As of 30 June 2026 it had awarded ₱6.1 billion to 3,699 claimants. That was about 25 percent of the 14,495 claimants who had filed claims estimated at ₱36 billion. Under revised implementing rules, 3,170 claims were transferred to the National Housing Authority to speed up payment. She also pointed to transparency with claimants, integrity in hiring and empathetic hearing of testimony as central to the board's work. She argued that in conflict-affected regions, institutions need systems that do not depend on any one leader. The MCB aims to finish its mandate by 30 June 2028.

=== Court of Appeals ===
On November 29, 2024, Dandamun-Latiph was also shortlisted by the Judicial and Bar Council for an appointment as an associate justice of the Court of Appeals.

=== Association of Former Members of Parliament-BTA BARMM ===
On August 17, 2026, Dandamun-Latiph was elected as founding president of the Association of Former Members of Parliament-Bangsamoro Transition Authority BARMM at the first General Assembly held for the election of members of the Board and Executive Committee. Created under Parliament Resolution No. 562 adopted on November 17, 2025, AFMP under the Office of the Speaker, serves as the official platform for former MPs to continue contributing to governance, community engagements and civic initiatives. Dandamun-Latiph belongs to the first cohort of BTA Members having served her tenure from March 1, 2019 to August 11, 2022. 79 former MPs laid the foundational legislations and created institutions for the establishment of the Bangsamoro Autonomous Region in Muslim Mindanao (BARMM). "Latiph said the association would give former lawmakers an avenue to continue contributing to governance and community development, while sharing their experience with the next generation of Bangsamoro Leaders."

== Education ==
Maisara Dandamun-Latiph completed her Bachelor of Arts in Public Administration at the University of the Philippines, Diliman, her Masters in Educational Leadership and School Improvement at the University of Manchester, England, UK as a Chevening scholar and belongs to the pioneering batch of Senior Executive Masters in National Security Administration at National Defense College of the Philippines and Bachelor of Laws and Juris doctor degree at San Beda University, Manila. After completing all her PhD course subjects for Doctor in Educational Administration and Development at the College of Education, University of the Philippines, Diliman she defended her dissertation topic outline entitled "Development of Educational Competencies in Fragile and Conflict affected areas.

== Personal life ==
Hailing from Lanao del Sur and Pampanga, Maisara Dandamun-Latiph grew up in a Muslim community in Metro Manila. She is a lawyer, a job she aspired to become in her childhood. Dandamun-Latiph is married to fellow lawyer Algamar Latiph with whom she has two children.
