= List of executive orders by Corazon Aquino =

Listed below are executive orders signed by Philippine President Corazon Aquino.

== 1986 ==
No.	Title	Date signed
1	Creating the Presidential Commission on Good Government	February 28, 1986
2	Regarding the funds, moneys, assets, and properties illegally acquired or misappropriated by former president Ferdinand Marcos, Mrs. Imelda Romualdez Marcos, their close relatives, subordinates business associates, dummies, agents, or nominees	March 12, 1986
3	Reorganizing the Office of the President, and for other purposes	March 12, 1986
5	Converting the Presidential Commission on Reorganization into a Presidential Commission on Government Reorganization, reconstituting its membership, and for other purposes	March 12, 1986
6	Providing procedures in the disposition of requests of Government officials and employees for authority to travel abroad	March 12, 1986
7	Appropriating funds for the Office of the Vice-President	March 12, 1986
8	Creating the Presidential Committee on Human Rights	March 18, 1986
9	Lifting the ban of the exportation of copra and reducing the additional export duty thereon	March 19, 1986
10	Placing the offices, agencies and corporations attached to the Ministry of Human Settlements under the administrative supervision of the Office of the President	March 26, 1986
11	Creating the Board of Administrators for Banahaw Broadcasting Corporation (BBC), Radio Philippine Network (RPN), and International Broadcasting Corporation (IBC) television and radio stations, defining its powers and functions, and for other purposes	April 8, 1986
12	Declaring the reorganization of the Supreme Court completed	April 16, 1986
13	Amending Executive Order No. 1, dated February 28, 1986, creating the Presidential Commission on Good Government	April 23, 1986
14	Defining the jurisdiction over cases involving the ill-gotten wealth of former president Ferdinand E. Marcos, Mrs. Imelda R. Marcos, members of their immediate family, close relatives, subordinates, close and/or business associates, dummies, agents and nominees	May 7, 1986
15	Abolishing the Economic Support Fund Council and transferring its functions to the National Economic & Development Authority	May 8, 1986
16	Amending Section 5 of Republic Act No. 265, as amended, to increase the membership of the Monetary Board	May 9, 1986
17	Prescribing rules and regulations for the implementation of Section 2, Article III of the Freedom Constitution	May 28, 1986
18	Creating a Sugar Regulatory Administration	May 28, 1986
19	Enhancing the independence of the Commission on Audit	June 19, 1986
20	Placing the offices, agencies and corporations attached to the Ministry of Energy under the administrative supervision of the Office of the President	June 19, 1986
21	Amending Section 128 of the National Internal Revenue Code, as amended, by revising the specific tax rates on petroleum products	June 19, 1986
22	Further amending certain provisions of the National Internal Revenue Code, as amended	June 25, 1986
23	Granting the public franking privileges on all communications being sent by them to the Constitutional Commission	June 26, 1986
24	Repealing Presidential Decree No. 1193, as amended, and Letter of Instructions No. 595, as amended, and accordingly revoking and cancelling the exclusive authority granted in favor of the Tourist Duty-Free Shops, Inc.	June 27, 1986
25	Granting exception from the payment of the travel tax to Filipino overseas contract workers	July 1, 1986
26	Abolishing the export duties on all export products, except logs, imposed under Section 514 of the Tariff and Customs Code, as amended	July 1, 1986
27	Education to maximize respect for human rights	July 4, 1986
28	Further amending certain provisions of Republic Act No. 1161, as amended, otherwise known as the Social Security Law	July 16, 1986
29	Repealing Presidential Decree No. 33	July 16, 1986
30	Recalling the franchise granted to the Manila International Port Terminals, Inc. (MIPTI) to operate and manage the International Port Complex at North Harbor, Manila	July 19, 1986
31	Granting compensation adjustments to Government personnel	July 23, 1986
32	Directing the establishment of a program for the conversion of Philippine external debt into equity investments	July 24, 1986
33	Amending certain sections of the Judiciary Reorganization Act of 1980, as amended	July 28, 1986
34	Reconstituting the governing boards of the Philippine Heart Center for Asia, Lung Center of the Philippines, National Kidney Foundation of the Philippines, Lungsod ng Kabataan and the Tondo General Hospital	July 29, 1986
35	Amending certain provisions of Presidential Decree No. 1752, entitled "Amending the Act creating the Home Development Mutual Fund"	July 30, 1986
36	Further amending certain sections of the National Internal Revenue Code, as amended	July 30, 1986
37	Further amending certain provisions of the National Internal Revenue Code, as amended	July 31, 1986
38	Amending Section 2307 of the Tariff and Customs Code of the Philippines, as amended	August 6, 1986
39	Enlarging the powers and functions of the Commissioner of Customs	August 6, 1986
14-A	Amending Executive Order No. 14	August 18, 1986
40	Further amending Section 163 of the National Internal Revenue Code, as amended	August 22, 1986
41	Declaring a one-time tax amnesty covering unpaid income taxes for the years 1981 to 1985	August 22, 1986
42	Proclaiming a one-time real property tax amnesty subject to certain conditions	August 22, 1986
43	Restructuring the private motor vehicle tax	August 22, 1986
44	Authorizing the Bureau of Internal Revenue to accept compromise payments on delinquent accounts and disputed assessments pending as of December 31, 1985	September 4, 1986
45	Amending Executive Order No. 1042 entitled "Providing for an Internal Revenue Service Career System in the Bureau of Internal Revenue and for other purposes"	September 4, 1986
46	Granting the Ministry of Tourism through the Philippine Tourism Authority (PTA), authority to establish and operate a duty and tax free merchandising system in the Philippines	September 4, 1986
47	Reorganizing the National Labor Relations Commission	September 10, 1986
48	Creating an ad hoc special committee to supervise the liquidation of the affairs of the Constitutional Commission of 1986, preservation of its records, and to undertake its Constitution Education Campaign	October 15, 1986
49	Restructuring the rates of import duties and classifications of certain articles under Section 104 of the Tariff and Customs Code of 1978, as amended, and for other purposes	October 15, 1986
50	Providing for the general registration of voters for the plebiscite on the proposed Constitution, for the plebiscite, appropriating funds therefor, and for other purposes	October 20, 1986
51	Adopting a National Code of Marketing of Breastmilk Substitutes, Breastmilk Supplements and Related Products, penalizing violations thereof, and for other purposes	October 20, 1986
52	Transferring the responsibility for flood control and drainage in Metropolitan Manila from the Ministry of Public Works and Highways to the Metropolitan Manila Commission, providing for a Metropolitan Manila Flood Control and Drainage Fund account in the National Treasury, and for other purposes	October 20, 1986
53	Increasing the amount of travelling allowances of Government officials and employees including local government units and Government-owned and/or controlled corporations when on official travel within the Philippines	October 29, 1986
54	Amending Executive Order No. 41	November 4, 1986
55	Transferring to the National Government the Philippine Nuclear Power Plant I (PNPP-I), its equipment, materials, facilities, records and uranium fuel, providing for the assumption of the remaining loan obligations of the National Power Corporation (NAPOCOR) with foreign lenders under the loans contracted by the National Power Corporation and guaranteed by the Republic of the Philippines and of the peso obligations incurred to finance the construction of the said nuclear plant by the National Government, and for other purposes	November 4, 1986
56	Authorizing the Ministry of Social Services and Development to take protective custody of child prostitutes and sexually exploited children, and for other purposes	November 6, 1986
57	Reorganizing the Commission on Elections and enhancing its independence	November 6, 1986
58	Rationalizing fees and other charges on firearms, explosives and explosives ingredients, security agencies and security guards	November 7, 1986
59	Repealing Presidential Decrees Nos. 1404, 1836, 1877 and 1877-A	November 7, 1986
60	Amending Section 4 of Executive Order No. 1061, entitled "Establishing the Philippine Rice Research Institute (PRRI)"	November 7, 1986
61	Providing for the transmission free of charge within the Philippines of official mail matter of city and provincial fiscals	November 7, 1986
62	Increasing the penalties provided for by Article 235 of Act No. 3815, as amended, the Revised Penal Code, on the maltreatment of prisoners	November 7, 1986
63	Granting incentives to foreign investment in tourist-related projects and tourist establishments and for other purposes	November 7, 1986
64	Further amending Executive Order No. 41, as amended	November 17, 1986
65	Repealing Presidential Decree No. 90 and Letter of Instructions No. 50	November 21, 1986
66	Amending Subsections "C" and "F" of Section Three Hundred Two of Presidential Decree Numbered Fourteen Hundred Sixty-Four, otherwise known as the Tariff and Customs Code of 1978, as amended	November 21, 1986
67	Reorganizing the Civil Service Commission	November 21, 1986
68	Modifying Presidential Decree No. 198, as amended	November 21, 1986
69	Increasing the aviation security fee on departing international passengers as prescribed in Letter of Instructions No. 414-A dated June 17, 1976	November 21, 1986
70	Further restructuring the import duty rates and classifications of certain articles under Section 104 of the Tariff and Customs Code, as amended	November 25, 1986
71	Amending Section 201 of the Tariff and Customs Code of the Philippines, changing the base for customs valuation from Home Consumption Value to Cost, Insurance and Freight (C.I.F.) and for other purposes	November 25, 1986
72	Further amending Section 227 of the National Internal Revenue Code, as amended, and for other purposes	November 25, 1986
73	Providing for the collection of real property taxes based on the 1984 real property values, as provided for under Section 21 of the Real Property Tax Code, as amended	November 25, 1986
67-A	Revoking Executive Order No. 67	November 26, 1986
74	Granting year-end bonus and cash gift to national and local government officials and employees	November 26, 1986
75	Upgrading the salary scales of foresters and legal officers of the Ministry of Natural Resources	November 28, 1986
76	Amending Section 1 of Presidential Decree No. 1955, by including the New Armed Forces of the Philippines Commissary and Exchange Service (NAFPCES) and the PC/INP Service Stores System (PC/INPSSS) among the exemption	December 2, 1986
77	Further amending Executive Order No. 755, as amended	December 2, 1986
78	Amending Paragraph 4 of Section 5 of Republic Act Number 291, as amended, entitled "An Act to provide for the procurement, promotion and elimination of regular officers of the Armed Forces of the Philippines and for other purposes"	December 2, 1986
79	Providing guidelines on the tour of active duty of reserve officers and strengthening their security of tenure and for other purposes	December 2, 1986
80	Providing for the 1986 Revised Charter of the Philippine National Bank	December 3, 1986
81	Providing for the 1986 Revised Charter of the Development Bank of the Philippines	December 3, 1986
82	Creating the Presidential Committee for the Urban Poor	December 8, 1986
83	Restructuring the compensation for the Airways Engineering and Airways Operations Groups of positions in the Bureau of Air Transportation	December 10, 1986
84	Directing the National Housing Authority to suspend the collection of amortization arrearages and delinquency interest charges on past due accounts of the beneficiaries of social housing lots in designated projects and to grant a moratorium on the eviction of legal occupants/awardees of social housing lots who have not signed appropriate sales/lease contracts	December 10, 1986
85	Abolishing the Office of Media Affairs and the Ministry of Human Settlements	December 12, 1986
96	Further amending Section Two of Republic Act No. 1862, as amended, and for other purposes	December 13, 1986
86	Restoring the ministry status of Budget Management	December 15, 1986
88	Amending Section 6 of Republic Act No. 6632 entitled "An Act granting the Philippine Racing Club, Inc., a franchise to operate and maintain a race track for horse racing in the province of Rizal" and for other purposes	December 16, 1986
89	Amending Section 4 of Republic Act No. 6631 entitled "An Act granting the Manila Jockey Club, Inc., a franchise to construct, operate and maintain a race track for horse racing in the city of Manila or in the province of Bulacan" and for other purposes	December 16, 1986
90	Identifying the Government agencies essential for the National Shelter Program and defining their mandates, creating the Housing and Urban Development Coordinating Council, rationalizing funding sources and lending mechanisms for home mortgages and for other purposes	December 17, 1986
91	Amending Articles 27, 28, 29, 31, 33 and 35 of Presidential Decree No. 603, otherwise known as the "Child and Youth Welfare Code"	December 17, 1986
92	Expanding the scope, responsibility and accountability of the Office of the Press Secretary	December 17, 1986
93	Withdrawing all tax and duty incentives, subject to certain exceptions, expanding the powers of the Fiscal Incentives Review Board and for other purposes	December 17, 1986
94	Amending certain provisions of the Omnibus Election Code of the Philippines for purposes of the February 2, 1987 plebiscite and for other purposes	December 17, 1986
95	Further amending Executive Order No. 41, as amended	December 17, 1986
87	The 1987 Budget of the Republic of the Philippines	December 18, 1986
97	Creating an Inter-Agency Committee on Technological Information Pilot System (TIPS), and for other purposes	December 18, 1986
98	Modifying Executive Order No. 55	December 18, 1986
99	Repealing Presidential Decrees Nos. 1727-A and 1804 which prohibit and penalize the grant of permits to certain persons	December 18, 1986
74-A	Expanding the coverage of the year-end bonus	December 19, 1986
100	Creating the Philippine Information Agency	December 24, 1986
101	Further amending Presidential Decree No. 1486, as amended by Presidential Decree No. 1606 creating a special court to be known as "Sandiganbayan"	December 24, 1986
102	Further amending certain sections of Republic Act No. 1161, as amended, otherwise known as the "Social Security Law"	December 24, 1986
103	Constituting the National Reconciliation and Development Program as a priority program of Government and for other purposes	December 24, 1986
104	Amending Executive Order No. 42	December 24, 1986
105	Amending certain sections of Presidential Decree No. 1519 to strengthen the Philippine Medical Care Plan	December 24, 1986
106	Restructuring the medical care benefits under the Philippine Medical Care Plan	December 24, 1986
107	Providing for the surrender of loose firearms, ammunition and explosives, granting benefits therefor, and for other purposes	December 24, 1986
108	Providing an official list of barangays in Region XII and for other purposes	December 24, 1986
109	Authorizing the Commissioner of Internal Revenue to monitor, check, supervise and approve all importations of blending tobacco subject to certain rules, imposing an additional imported blending tobacco inspection and monitoring fee, and for other purposes	December 24, 1986
110	Allowing certain National Government agencies to continue the practice of paying medical and incentive allowances based on prior years' tradition	December 24, 1986
111	Amending certain provisions of the Labor Code of the Philippines, as amended	December 24, 1986
112	Placing all budget officers of provinces, cities and municipalities under the administrative control and technical supervision of the Ministry of Budget and Management	December 24, 1986
113	Establishing the Comprehensive Agricultural Loan Fund (CALF), creating the Agricultural Credit Policy Council (ACPC) and for other purposes	December 24, 1986
114	Authorizing the release of ₱487 million to the Sugar Regulatory Administration to liquidate unpaid National Sugar Trading Corporation obligations to sugar producers for the crop year 1984-1985 and for other purposes	December 24, 1986
115	Reorganizing the National Security Council and defining its membership, function, and authority and other purposes	December 24, 1986

== 1987 ==
No.	Title	Date signed
116	Renaming the Ministry of Agriculture and Food as Ministry of Agriculture, reorganizing its units, integrating all offices and agencies whose functions relate to agriculture and fishery into the ministry and for other purposes	January 30, 1987
117	Reorganization of the Ministry of Education, Culture and Sports prescribing its powers and functions and for other purposes	January 30, 1987
118	Creating the Presidential Commission on Culture and Arts	January 30, 1987
119	Reorganizing the Ministry of Health, its attached agencies and for other purposes	January 30, 1987
120	Reorganizing the Ministry of Tourism, defining its powers and functions, and for other purposes	January 30, 1987
121	Reorganizing and strengthening the Philippine Statistical System and for other purposes	January 30, 1987
122	Abolishing the Office of Muslim Affairs and Cultural Communities	January 30, 1987
122-A	Creating the Office on Muslim Affairs	January 30, 1987
122-B	Creating the Office for Northern Cultural Communities	January 30, 1987
122-C	Creating the Office for Southern Cultural Communities	January 30, 1987
123	Reorganizing the Ministry of Social Services and Development, now referred to as Ministry of Social Welfare and Development	January 30, 1987
124	Reorganizing the Ministry of Public Works and Highways, redefining its powers and functions, and for other purposes	January 30, 1987
125	Reorganizing the Ministry of Transportation and Communications defining its powers and functions and for other purposes	January 30, 1987
126	Reorganizing the Ministry of Labor and Employment and for other purposes	January 30, 1987
127	Reorganizing the Ministry of Finance	January 30, 1987
128	Reorganizing the National Science and Technology Authority	January 30, 1987
129	Reorganizing the Ministry of Agrarian Reform and for other purposes	January 30, 1987
130	Reorganizing the Presidential Management Staff, merging and consolidating all offices and agencies whose functions overlap and/or are inter-related, defining its powers and functions and for other purposes	January 30, 1987
131	Reorganizing the Ministry of Natural Resources and renaming it as the Department of Environment, Energy and Natural Resources abolishing the Ministry of Energy integrating all offices and agencies whose functions relate to energy and natural resources into the ministry defining its powers and functions and for other purposes	January 30, 1987
132	Reorganizing the Department of Foreign Affairs	February 27, 1987
133	Reorganizing the Department of Trade and Industry, its attached agencies, and for other purposes	February 27, 1987
134	Enabling Act for the elections for members of Congress on May 11, 1987, and for other purposes	February 27, 1987
135	Amending Sections 19(6) and 8 of Presidential Decrees Nos. 807 and 1409, respectively, and revoking and/or repealing Memorandum Circular No. 1284 dated June 4, 1985	February 27, 1987
136	Establishing the Council for Investments in Trade, Industry, Tourism, Agriculture, Natural Resources, Transportation, Communications and Services and for other purposes	February 27, 1987
137	Expanding the sources and utilization of the Oil Price Stabilization Fund (OPSF) by amending Presidential Decree No. 1956	February 27, 1987
138	Simplifying the procedures on Philippine Government approval of projects/investments in the Philippines for purposes of Overseas Private Investment Corporation (OPIC) political risks insurance coverage and for other purposes	February 27, 1987
139	Modifying the rates of import duty on certain imported articles as provided for in the Tariff and Customs Code of 1978, as amended, in order to implement the margins of preference in accordance with the decisions of the Seventeenth ASEAN Economic Ministers (AEM) Meeting and the Eighteenth Meeting of the Committee on Trade and Tourism (COTT)	February 27, 1987
140	Modifying the rates of import duty on certain imported articles as provided for in the Tariff and Customs Code of 1978, as amended, in order to implement the margins of preference in accordance with the ASEAN Agreement of Preferential Trading Arrangements with respect to certain articles negotiated during the Nineteenth and Twentieth Meeting of the ASEAN Committee on Trade and Tourism	February 27, 1987
141	Modifying the rates of import duty on certain imported articles as provided under the Tariff and Customs Code of 1978, as amended, in order to implement the margins of preference in accordance with the ASEAN Agreement on Preferential Trading Arrangements with respect to certain articles negotiated during the Twenty First Meeting of the ASEAN Committee on Trade and Tourism	February 27, 1987
142	Modifying the rates of import duty on certain imported articles as provided under the Tariff and Customs Code of 1978, as amended, in order to implement the decision taken by the Seventeenth ASEAN Economic Ministers (AEM) Meeting to extend a 50% margin of preference to the slaughtered meat AIJV product as provided for in Article III Paragraph 6 of the Basic Agreement on ASEAN Industrial Joint Ventures (BAAIJV)	February 27, 1987
143	Modifying the rates of import duty on certain imported articles as provided under the Tariff and Customs Code of 1978, as amended, in order to implement the decisions of the Eighteenth ASEAN Economic Ministers (AEM) and Twenty-First Committee on Trade and Tourism (COTT) Meetings to provide a minimum level of 25% margin of preference in respect to items which are under the ASEAN Preferential Trading Arrangements (PTA)	February 27, 1987
144	Supplemental Law on the May 11, 1987 elections for members of Congress	March 2, 1987
145	Amending Section 1 of Republic Act No. 5059, entitled "An Act granting life pension and franking privilege to former Presidents of the Philippines"	March 2, 1987
146	Reorganizing the membership in the governing board of the Philippine Coconut Authority	March 3, 1987
147	Expanding the coverage of the grant of medical allowance under Executive Order No. 110 dated December 24, 1986	March 3, 1987
148	Modifying Executive Order No. 114 dated December 24, 1986	March 3, 1987
131-A	Suspending the implementation of Executive Order No. 131, dated January 30, 1987	March 6, 1987
149	Providing for the condonation of penalties on delinquent housing loan accounts with the Social Security System, subject to certain conditions	March 15, 1987
150	Creating the Presidential Blue Ribbon Commission and for other purposes	March 19, 1987
151	Allowing certain National Government corporations to continue the practice of paying travel allowances based on prior years' tradition	March 19, 1987
152	Granting salary increases to Career Executive Service officers of the Government	March 25, 1987
152-A	Further rationalizing the salaries of justices and judges of the lower courts of the Judiciary and the Special Prosecutors of the Office of the Tanodbayan	March 25, 1987
153	Granting salary increases to rank and file Government employees	March 25, 1987
154	Creating an award to be known as the "Award of the February 1986 Revolution Ribbon" and providing for the grant thereof	March 30, 1987
155	Amending Republic Act No. 857	March 30, 1987
156	Further amending Section 201 of the Tariff and Customs Code of the Philippines, as amended, changing the base for customs valuation from Home Consumption Value to Cost, Plus Insurance and Freight (C.I.F.) and for other purposes	March 30, 1987
157	Providing for absentee voting by officers and employees of Government who are away from the places of their registration by reason of official functions on Election Day	March 30, 1987
125-A	Amending Executive Order No. 125, entitled "Reorganizing the Ministry of Transportation and Communications, defining its powers and functions, and for other purposes"	April 13, 1987
158	Creating the "Tulong sa Tao Fund" and for other purposes	April 13, 1987
159	Reverting to the Philippine Ports Authority its corporate autonomy, ensuring the rapid development of ports or the port system directly under it, and authorizing it to execute port projects under its port program	April 13, 1987
160	Further amending Presidential Decree No. 79, as amended, entitled "Revising the Population Act of Nineteen Hundred and Seventy One"	April 13, 1987
161	Exempting from sale tax goods sold to the Asian Development Bank and exempting from contractors tax services rendered to the Asian Development Bank	April 21, 1987
162	Further amending B.P. Blg. 881, otherwise known as the "Omnibus Election Code of the Philippines"	May 5, 1987
163	Declaring the effectivity of the creation of the Commission on Human Rights as provided for in the 1987 Constitution, providing guidelines for the operation thereof, and for other purposes	May 5, 1987
164	Providing additional guidelines in the processing and approval of contracts of the National Government	May 5, 1987
165	Abolishing the Presidential Commission on Government Reorganization, transferring its remaining functions to the Department of Budget and Management, and for other purposes	May 5, 1987
166	Granting a new deadline for the filing of income tax returns for the income earned in the year 1986 by non-resident Filipinos, without penalty	May 5, 1987
167	Repealing Presidential Decrees Nos. 1835 and 1975, and reviving Republic Act No. 1700 entitled "An Act to outlaw the Communist Party of the Philippines and similar associations, penalizing membership therein and for other purposes"	May 5, 1987
168	Repealing Presidential Decree No. 1587 entitled "Instituting the Administrative Code of 1978"	May 5, 1987
169	Repealing Presidential Decree No. 810, entitled "An Act granting the Philippine Jai-Alai and Amusement Corporation a franchise to operate, construct and maintain a fronton for Basque pelota and similar games of skill in the Greater Manila Area", as amended, and accordingly revoking and cancelling the right, privilege, and authority granted therein	May 8, 1987
170	Repealing Presidential Decree No. 1507, entitled "An Act granting the Philippine Games and Holidays Corporation a franchise to operate, construct and maintain a fronton for Basque pelota and similar games of skill in the city of Cebu", and accordingly revoking and cancelling the right, privilege and authority granted therein	May 8, 1987
171	Amending certain provisions of Presidential Decree No. 334, as amended and Executive Order No. 131	May 8, 1987
172	Creating the Energy Regulatory Board	May 8, 1987
173	Further amending Commonwealth Act No. 542, entitled "An Act to create a corporation to be known as the Girl Scouts of the Philippines, and to define its powers and purposes", as amended	May 8, 1987
174	Further amending Republic Act No. 5921, entitled "An Act regulating the practice of pharmacy and setting standards of pharmaceutical education in the Philippines and for other purposes", as amended	May 22, 1987
175	Further amending Republic Act No. 3720 entitled "An Act to ensure the safety and purity of foods, drugs, and cosmetics being made available to the public by creating the Food and Drug Administration which shall administer and enforce the laws pertaining thereto"; as amended, and for other purposes	May 22, 1987
176	Repealing General Order No. 47 and for other purposes	May 28, 1987
177	Providing for a new period for the approval of the new position structure and staffing pattern of Government departments, agencies and offices undergoing reorganization	May 28, 1987
178	Increasing the statutory daily minimum wages after integrating the cost of living allowances under Wage Orders Nos. 1, 2, 3, 5 and 6 into the basic pay of all covered workers	June 1, 1987
180	Providing guidelines for the exercise of the right to organize of Government employees, creating a Public Sector Labor-Management Council, and for other purposes	June 1, 1987
181	Authorizing the reorganization of the Civil Service Commission and enhancing its independence, and for other purposes	June 1, 1987
182	Rationalizing public work measures, appropriating funds for public works, and for other purposes	June 3, 1987
183	Repealing Presidential Decree No. 1110-A, as amended by Presidential Decree No. 1743, which provides for and penalizes the crime of lese majeste	June 5, 1987
184	Amending Section 3 of Presidential Decree No. 1606	June 5, 1987
185	Expanding the powers of the Board of Directors of the Philippine Export and Foreign Loan Guarantee Corporation under Presidential Decree No. 1080	June 5, 1987
186	Further amending Section 163, Paragraph (2), of the National Internal Revenue Code, as amended	June 5, 1987
187	Repealing Presidential Decrees Nos. 38, 942, 970, 1735, 1834, 1974, and 1996 and Articles 142-A and 142-B of the Revised Penal Code and restoring Articles 135, 136, 137, 138, 140, 141, 142, 143, 144, 146, 177, 178, and 179 to full force and effect as they existed before said amendatory decrees	June 5, 1987
179	Further amending Title II, Book Four of the Labor Code of the Philippines (Presidential Decree No. 442, as amended)	June 7, 1987
188	Further amending Section 5 of Presidential Decree No. 492, as amended	June 9, 1987
189	Placing all public secondary school teachers under the administrative supervision and control of the Department of Education, Culture and Sports and for other purposes	June 10, 1987
190	Repealing Presidential Decrees Nos. 1791 and 1774	June 10, 1987
191	Modifying Executive Order No. 59	June 10, 1987
192	Providing for the reorganization of the Department of Environment, Energy and Natural Resources, renaming it as the Department of Environment and Natural Resources, and for other purposes	June 10, 1987
193	Providing for the reorganization of the Office of Energy Affairs and for other purposes	June 10, 1987
194	Restructuring the taxes on and providing for the distribution of receipts in horse racing, and for other purposes	June 16, 1987
195	Amending Paragraph (B) of Section 128 of the National Internal Revenue Code, as amended, by revising the excise tax rates on certain petroleum products	June 17, 1987
196	Vesting the jurisdiction, control and regulation over the Philippine Communications Satellite Corporation with the National Telecommunications Commission	June 17, 1987
197	Increasing the composition of the board of trustees of the Metropolitan Waterworks and Sewerage System	June 17, 1987
198	Providing for the manner of nomination and appointment of sectoral representatives to the House of Representatives	June 18, 1987
200	Providing for the publication of laws either in the Official Gazette or in a newspaper of general circulation in the Philippines as a requirement for their effectivity	June 18, 1987
199	Granting franking privileges to the members of the new Congress of the Philippines from June 30, 1987 to August 30, 1987	June 19, 1987
201	Further amending Executive Order No. 125, entitled "Reorganizing the Ministry of Transportation and Communications, defining its powers and functions, and for other purposes", as amended	June 19, 1987
202	Creating the Land Transportation Franchising and Regulatory Board	June 19, 1987
163-A	Amending Section 2, Sub-Paragraph (C) of Executive Order No. 163	June 30, 1987
203	Providing a list of regular holidays and special days to be observed throughout the Philippines and for other purposes	June 30, 1987
204	Modifying the composition of the Board of Regents of the University of the Philippines System, further amending Presidential Decree No. 58, as amended	June 30, 1987
205	Regulating the operation of Cable Antenna Television (CATV) systems in the Philippines, and for other purposes	June 30, 1987
206	Amending Section 105 of the Tariff and Customs Code of the Philippines	June 30, 1987
207	Extending franking privilege to the Supreme Court	July 1, 1987
208	Creating the Cebu Upland Project Office and providing funds therefor	July 1, 1987
209	Family Code of the Philippines	July 6, 1987
210	Amending Executive Order No. 603, entitled "Creating a Light Rail Transit Authority, vesting the same with authority to construct and operate the Light Rail Transit (LRT) project and providing funds therefor"	July 7, 1987
211	Prescribing the interim procedures in the processing and approval of applications for the exploration, development and utilization of minerals	July 10, 1987
212	Amending Presidential Decree No. 169	July 10, 1987
213	Amending the definition of "bulk containers" for milk import as provided for in Executive Order No. 49	July 10, 1987
214	Further amending Article 29 of the Revised Penal Code, as amended	July 10, 1987
215	Amending Presidential Decree No. 40 and allowing the private sector to generate electricity	July 10, 1987
216	Declaring the effectivity of the creation of a Judicial and Bar Council as provided for in the 1987 Constitution	July 10, 1987
217	Further amending Section 5 of Republic Act No. 776, as amended	July 10, 1987
218	Extending the applicability of Presidential Decree No. 1961, as amended, to the 1987-1992 Philippine Financing Package and the foreign currency loans, credits and indebtedness made, guaranteed or insured by foreign governments and their agencies maturing on or after January 1, 1987 through December 31, 1992, subject to limitations	July 14, 1987
219	Appropriating funds for the settlement of the Letter of Undertaking dated May 18, 1985, and for other purposes	July 14, 1987
204-A	Further amending Presidential Decree No. 58, as amended	July 15, 1987
220	Creating a Cordillera Administrative Region, appropriating funds therefor and for other purposes	July 15, 1987
221	Authorizing the exportation of certain kinds of buntal fibers and filaments, and for other purposes	July 15, 1987
222	Providing for a new period for the application of Executive Order No. 107 dated December 24, 1986	July 15, 1987
275	Providing for the gradual and orderly dissolution of all paramilitary units, including the Civilian Home Defense Forces, and for other purposes	July 15, 1987
276	Amending Republic Act No. 1700, otherwise known as the Anti-Subversion Act	July 15, 1987
223	Vesting on the Philippine National Oil Company (PNOC) the jurisdiction, control, management, protection, development and rehabilitation over the watershed areas of geothermal reservations where PNOC has geothermal projects, plants, and properties	July 16, 1987
224	Vesting on the Philippine National Oil Company the complete jurisdiction, control and regulation over watershed areas and reservations surrounding its power generating plants and properties of said corporation	July 16, 1987
225	Further amending Section 228 of the National Internal Revenue Code, as amended	July 16, 1987
226	Omnibus Investments Code of 1987	July 16, 1987
227	Amending Executive Order No. 209, otherwise known as the "Family Code of the Philippines"	July 17, 1987
228	Declaring full land ownership to qualified farmer beneficiaries covered by Presidential Decree No. 27; determining the value of remaining unvalued rice and corn lands subject to P.D. No. 27; and providing for the manager of payment by the farmer beneficiary and mode of compensation to the landowner	July 17, 1987
120-A	Further strengthening the operation of the Philippine Convention Bureau, renaming the bureau as the Philippine Convention and Visitors Corporation thereby amending Presidential Decree No. 1448, series of 1978, and for other purposes	July 20, 1987
150-A	Repealing Executive Order No. 150 dated March 19, 1987 creating the Presidential Blue Ribbon Commission and for other purposes	July 20, 1987
124-A	Amending Executive Order No. 124, dated 30 January 1987, reorganizing the Department of Public Works and Highways, redefining its powers and functions, and for other purposes	July 22, 1987
124-B	Reorganizing the Metropolitan Manila Flood Control and Drainage Council, attaching it to the Department of Public Works and Highways, providing for a Metropolitan Manila Flood Control and Drainage Fund account in the National Treasury and for other purposes	July 22, 1987
127-A	Creating the Corporate Affairs Group and for the purposes	July 22, 1987
229	Providing the mechanisms for the implementation of the Comprehensive Agrarian Reform Program	July 22, 1987
230	Reorganizing the National Economic and Development Authority	July 22, 1987
231	Transferring the Home Economics Division of the Department of Social Welfare and Development to the Department of Agriculture, renaming it Farm Home Resources Management Section (FHRMS) and redefining its functions	July 22, 1987
232	Providing for the structural and functional reorganization of the National Council for the Welfare of the Disabled Persons and for other purposes	July 22, 1987
233	Redefining the role and organizational structure and enlarging the membership of the Council for the Welfare of Children	July 22, 1987
234	Reorganizing the National Nutrition Council	July 22, 1987
235	Providing for the transmission free of charge of official mail matter of the Office of the Vice-President	July 22, 1987
236	Strengthening the Government Corporate Monitoring and Coordinating Committee and for other purposes	July 22, 1987
237	Reorganizing the Cabinet Secretariat and for other purposes	July 22, 1987
238	Placing the Kilusang Kabuhayan at Kaunlaran (KKK) capital and its earnings under the control and supervision of the Office of the President, and for other purposes	July 22, 1987
239	Reorganizing the Department of Foreign Affairs and for other purposes	July 24, 1987
240	Providing for the reorganization of the Office of the Vice-President and for other purposes	July 24, 1987
241	Disposition of specific functions/roles, programs and projects under the Presidential Management Staff	July 24, 1987
242	Amending Executive Order No. 133, series of 1987 entitled "Reorganizing the Department of Trade and Industry its attached agencies, and for other purposes"	July 24, 1987
243	Declaring the effectivity of the Office of the Ombudsman as provided for in the 1987 Constitution	July 24, 1987
244	Declaring the effectivity of the creation of the Office of the Special Prosecutor as provided for in the 1987 Constitution	July 24, 1987
245	Implementing the consolidation of all tobacco agencies and the creation of the National Tobacco Administration, prescribing its charter and for other purposes	July 24, 1987
246	Providing for the creation of the National Intelligence Coordinating Agency and for other purposes	July 24, 1987
247	Reorganizing the Philippine Overseas Employment Administration and for other purposes	July 24, 1987
248	Amending Executive Order No. 906, further directing the review of the Progressive Car Manufacturing Program (PCMP), and for other purposes	July 24, 1987
177-A	Amending Executive Order No. 177 dated May 28, 1987 providing for the new position structure and staffing pattern of Government departments, agencies and offices undergoing reorganization	July 25, 1987
249	Providing for a new income classification of provinces, cities and municipalities, and for other purposes	July 25, 1987
250	Increasing, integrating, and rationalizing the insurance benefits of barangay officials under R.A. 4898, as amended, and members of sangguniang panlalawigan, sangguniang panlungsod, and sangguniang bayan under P.D. 1147 and for other purposes	July 25, 1987
251	Amending certain sections of Executive Order No. 126 dated January 30, 1987	July 25, 1987
252	Further amending Articles 213, 214 and 215 of Presidential Decree No. 442, as amended	July 25, 1987
253	Amending Batas Pambansa Blg. 73	July 25, 1987
254	Amending Executive Order Numbered One Hundred Thirteen, series of Nineteen Hundred Fifty-Five	July 25, 1987
255	Requiring all radio stations with musical format programs to broadcast a minimum of four original Pilipino musical compositions in every clockhour and for other purposes	July 25, 1987
256	Increasing the daily subsistence allowance of patents confined in AFP/INP hospitals and dispensaries, cadets of the Philippine Military Academy, the Philippine Air Force Flying School and the Philippine National Police Academy, and AFP/INP personnel undergoing training in local trading institutions.	July 25, 1987
257	Increasing the subsistence allowance of officers and enlisted personnel of the Armed Forces of the Philippines, including draftees, trainees and probationary second lieutenants/ensigns undergoing military training, CMT and enlisted reservists undergoing training or assembly/mobilization test, and uniformed members of the Integrated National Police	July 25, 1987
258	Granting Government hospitals and the Bureau of Food and Drugs autonomy in the use of their income	July 25, 1987
259	An Act to rationalize the soap and detergent surfactant industry and thereby promote and expand the utilization of chemicals derived from coconut oil and for other purposes	July 25, 1987
260	Further amending Section 11, Paragraph 1, of Presidential Decree No. 1869, as amended	July 25, 1987
261	Directing the Department of Budget and Management to prepare a new position and compensation plan for the Department of Justice, the Office of the Solicitor General, and the Office of the Government Corporate Counsel, providing funds for such new position and compensation plan, and for other purposes	July 25, 1987
262	Reorganizing the Department of Local Government and for other purposes	July 25, 1987
263	Appropriating funds for the operations of the Philippine Information Agency	July 25, 1987
264	Providing for the Citizen Armed Force	July 25, 1987
265	Creating the Aurora Integrated Area Development Project Office, providing funds therefor and for other purposes	July 25, 1987
266	Providing for two service units in the Office of the Assistant Secretary for Land Transportation in the Department of Transportation and Communications, defining the powers and functions thereof and for other purposes	July 25, 1987
267	Further amending Commonwealth Act No. 542, entitled "An Act to create a corporation to be known as the Girl Scouts of the Philippines, and to define its powers and purposes", as amended	July 25, 1987
268	Exempting the dormant accounts of the Philippine Postal Savings Bank from the prescribed escheat proceedings under Sections 2000 and 2000-A of the Revised Administrative Code	July 25, 1987
269	Amending Presidential Decree No. 1519, entitled "Revising the Philippine Medicare Act of Nineteen Hundred and Sixty Nine"	July 25, 1987
270	Amending Proclamation No. 94 providing for the holding of local elections pursuant to the Second Paragraph of Section 1, Article XVIII of the 1987 Constitution, and appropriating funds therefor	July 25, 1987
271	Amending Section 2 of Executive Order No. 19 and Section 20 of Presidential Decree No. 1445	July 25, 1987
272	Further amending Article 125 of the Revised Penal Code, as amended	July 25, 1987
273	Adopting a value-added tax, amending for this purpose certain provisions of the National Internal Revenue Code, and for other purposes	July 25, 1987
274	Creating the Presidential Council for Youth Affairs and for other purposes	July 25, 1987
277	Amending Section 68 of Presidential Decree (P.D.) No. 705, as amended, otherwise known as the Revised Forestry Code of the Philippines, for the purpose of penalizing possession of timber or other forest products without the legal documents required by existing forest laws, authorizing the confiscation of illegally cut, gathered, removed and possessed forest products, and granting rewards to informers of violations of forestry laws, rules and regulations	July 25, 1987
278	Prescribing the interim procedures in the processing and approval of applications for the development or utilization of forestlands and/or forest resources	July 25, 1987
279	Authorizing the Secretary of Environment and Natural Resources to negotiate and conclude joint venture, co-production, or production-sharing agreements for the exploration, development and utilization of mineral resources, and prescribing the guidelines for such agreements and those agreements involving technical or financial assistance by foreign-owned corporations for large-scale exploration, development, and utilization of minerals	July 25, 1987
280	Expanding the incentive features of Letter of Instructions (LOI) No. 1352 dated September 8, 1983 to encourage crude oil export processing activities in the country by including therein intermediate products for feedstocks and authorizing the swap or exchange of petroleum products, thereby amending LOI No. 1352, and for other purposes	July 25, 1987
281	Amending Executive Order No. 142 dated February 27, 1987 by increasing from 50% to 75% the margin of preference (MOP) on slaughtered meat AIJV product and extending the same margin of preference of 75% to mechanical and power rack and pinion steerings and constant velocity joints to implement the supplementary agreement to amend the Basic Agreement on ASEAN Industrial Joint Ventures (BAAIJV)	July 25, 1987
282	Declaring a one-time amnesty on unsettled travel tax assessments subject to certain conditions	July 25, 1987
283	Restructuring the travel tax exemptions and restoring the reduced rates on certain individuals, amending for this purpose, Presidential Decree No. 1183, as amended	July 25, 1987
284	Authorizing the holding of other Government offices or positions by the members of the Cabinet, undersecretaries, assistant secretaries and other appointive officials of the Executive Department under certain conditions	July 25, 1987
285	Abolishing the General Service Administration and transferring its functions to appropriate Government agencies	July 25, 1987
286	Creating the Sequestered Assets Disposition Authority (SADA) and for other purposes	July 25, 1987
287	Repealing Presidential Decree No. 1153, entitled "Requiring the planting of one tree every month for five consecutive years by every citizen of the Philippines"	July 25, 1987
288	Further amending the Charter of the Development Academy of the Philippines, and for other purposes	July 25, 1987
289	Further amending Republic Act No. 265, as amended otherwise known as "The Central Bank Act"	July 25, 1987
290	Authorizing the payment of reasonable incentive fees to foreign banks, investment banks and other financial institutions participating in the debt-to-equity conversion program and/or the privatization scheme of the Philippine Government and providing funds therefor	July 25, 1987
291	Granting postal privileges for the blind, and for other purposes	July 25, 1987
292	Administrative Code of 1987	July 25, 1987
293	Amending Executive Order No. 122-C entitled, "Creating the Office for Southern Cultural Communities"	July 25, 1987
295	Amending Executive Order No. 122-A entitled, "Creating the Office on Muslim Affairs"	July 25, 1987
296	Authorizing the sale, lease or any other manner of disposition of certain Philippine properties in Japan to non-Filipino citizens or to entities owned by non-Filipino citizens, and for other purposes	July 25, 1987
297	Reorganization of the Office of the Press Secretary prescribing its powers and functions and other purposes	July 25, 1987
129-A	Modifying Executive Order No. 129 reorganizing and strengthening the Department of Agrarian Reform and for other purposes	July 26, 1987
242-A	Modifying Executive Order No. 242 dated July 24, 1987 which amends Executive Order No. 133, series of 1987, entitled "Reorganizing the Department of Trade and Industry, and for other purposes"	July 26, 1987
298	Amending Sections 7, 10, 11 and 13 of Executive Order No. 778, as amended by Executive Orders Nos. 903 and 909, creating the Manila International Airport Authority	July 26, 1987
299	Modifying Executive Order No. 873 dated March 4, 1983	July 26, 1987
300	Constituting the Office of the Solicitor General as an independent autonomous office attached to the Department of Justice and for other purposes	July 26, 1987
301	Decentralizing actions on Government negotiated contracts, lease contracts and records disposal	July 26, 1987
302	Amending P.D. 848, converting the Kalinga Special Development Region into the Kalinga Special Development Authority and for other purposes	July 26, 1987
294	Amending Executive Order No. 122-B entitled, "Creating the Office for Northern Cultural Communities"	July 28, 1987
303	Reducing the rate of import duty on crude oil as provided under Presidential Decree No. 1464, otherwise known as Tariff and Customs Code of 1978, as amended	August 25, 1987
304	Authorizing the Task Force on Refugee Assistance and Administration and the Department of Foreign Affairs to respectively issue identity papers and travel documents to refugees staying in the Philippines and prescribing guidelines therefor	August 31, 1987
305	Creating the Council of State	September 9, 1987
306	Reducing the rate of import duty on crude oil as provided under Presidential Decree No. 1464, otherwise known as the Tariff and Customs Code of 1978, as amended	October 20, 1987
307	Establishing an Occupational Safety and Health Center in the Employees' Compensation Commission	November 4, 1987
308	Providing for the reorganization of the regional development councils	November 5, 1987
309	Reorganizing the Peace and Order Council	November 11, 1987
310	Granting year-end bonus and cash gift to National Government officials and employees	November 12, 1987
311	Reducing the rate of tax on indigenous petroleum as provided for under Section 129, (as renumbered to Section 151 (A) (4) under Executive Order No. 273), of the National Internal Revenue Code, as amended	December 10, 1987
312	Reducing the rate of tax on indigenous petroleum as provided for under Section 129, (as renumbered to Section 151 (A) (4) under Executive Order No. 273), of the National Internal Revenue Code, as amended	December 16, 1987
313	Prohibiting Philippine Government officials to visit Taiwan or to receive calls by visiting Taiwanese officials	December 17, 1987

== 1988 ==
No.	Title	Date signed
315	Renaming the Cabinet Committee on the Bataan Nuclear Power Plant as "The Presidential Committee on the Philippine Nuclear Power Plant" and defining its structure, powers and functions	January 4, 1988
316	Instituting the Presidential Citation for Outstanding Service to Philippine Democracy	January 19, 1988
317	Amending Sections 1, 3 and 4 of Executive Order No. 329, s. 1987 entitled "Reorganizing the Peace and Order Council"	February 5, 1988
318	Amending Sections 2(A-I) and 3(A) of Executive Order No. 308, "Providing for the reorganization of the regional development councils"	February 12, 1988
319	Providing for the reorganization of the local development council	March 4, 1988
320	Amending Executive Order No. 309, s. 1987, entitled "Reorganizing the Peace and Order Council", as amended by Executive Order No. 317, s. 1988	March 11, 1988
321	Expanding the territorial area of the South Harbor Port Zone of the Port of Manila under the jurisdiction of the Philippine Ports Authority	March 17, 1988
322	Providing for the arrangements for the convening of the Regional Consultative Commission for Muslim Mindanao, fixing the date, time, and place thereof, and for other purposes	March 24, 1988
323	Amending Executive Order No. 316, dated January 19, 1988, instituting the Presidential Citation for Outstanding Service to Philippine Democracy	April 12, 1988
324	Waiving passport requirements for immigrants under certain conditions	April 13, 1988
325	Modifying the rates of import duty on certain imported articles as provided under the Tariff and Customs Code of 1978, as amended, in order to implement the decisions of the Third ASEAN Summit and the Twenty-Third Meeting of the Committee on Trade and Tourism (COTT) to provide a minimum level of 25% margin on preference to certain items which are contained in the Philippine exclusion list and to deepen the margin of preference in respect of certain items which are under the ASEAN Preferential Trading Arrangements (PTA) to 50% within five years	May 23, 1988
326	Amending Section 6 of Executive Order No. 856 and reorganizing and reactivating the provincial city committees on justice created thereunder	June 1, 1988
328	Reconstituting the Cabinet Committee on the Law of the Sea	June 5, 1988
327	Implementing certain provisions of Executive Orders Nos. 715 series of 1981, 238 series of 1987 and 314 series of 1987 and for other purposes	June 9, 1988
329	Creating appraisal committees in the Metropolitan Manila area, defining their general functions, and prescribing their procedures	July 11, 1988
330	Calling the Cordillera Regional Assembly to a special session, clarifying its responsibility, providing funds for its 1988 operations, and for other purposes	July 12, 1988
331	Providing for the arrangements for the convening of the Cordillera Regional Consultative Commission, fixing the date, time, and place thereof, and for other purposes	July 20, 1988
332	Reconstituting the Task Force on International Refugee Assistance and Administration, and for other purposes	August 12, 1988
333	Revoking Letters of Instructions Nos. 151 and 151-A	August 16, 1988
334	Instituting the Presidential Awards for Outstanding Public Service	August 18, 1988
335	Enjoining all departments/ bureaus/ offices/ instrumentalities of the Government to take such steps as are necessary for the purpose of using Filipino language in official transactions, communications and correspondence	August 25, 1988
336	Establishing labor-based units in the infrastructure agencies of the Government and for other purposes	September 13, 1988
337	Prescribing regulations governing the discharge or separation by administrative action of officers of the Regular Force and reserve officers on extended tour of active duty in the Armed Forces of the Philippines	September 13, 1988
338	Creating the Energy Coordinating Council	September 30, 1988
339	Directing department secretaries, undersecretaries, assistant secretaries, and other Government officials of equivalent rank in the Executive Department to limit their official travels abroad to those which are urgent and necessary	October 3, 1988
340	Lifting the suspension of payment of all taxes, duties, fees, imposts and other charges, whether direct or indirect, due and payable by copper mining companies to the national and local governments under Letter of Instructions No. 1416, dated July 17, 1984	October 14, 1988
341	Providing guidelines on Section 4 of Republic Act No. 6679, "An Act to amend Republic Act No. 6653 to postpone the barangay elections to March 28, 1989, prescribing additional rules governing the conduct of barangay elections and for other purposes"	November 8, 1988
342	Delegating to the Secretary of Local Government the power to appoint certain local officials under Sections 42(4), 48(3), 49(2), 146(1) and (2), 173(1) and (5), and 205(2) of the Local Government Code, as amended	November 28, 1988
314	Creating the Bagong Kilusang Kabuhayan at Kaunlaran Committee	December 17, 1988
343	Reconstituting the Commission on Export Procedures	December 19, 1988

== 1989 ==
No.	Title	Date signed
344	Increasing the benefits for medical/dental practitioners' fees provided for under the Philippine Medical Care Plan	January 13, 1989
345	Modifying the rates of import duty on certain imported articles as provided under the Tariff and Customs Code of 1978, as amended, in order to implement the decisions of the Third ASEAN Summit and the Twenty-Fourth Meeting of the Committee on Trade and Tourism (COTT) to provide a minimum level of 25% margin on preference to certain items which are contained in the Philippines exclusion list and to deepen the margin of preference in respect of certain items which are under the ASEAN Preferential Trading Arrangements (PTA) to 50% within five years	January 23, 1989
346	Increasing the rate of daily subsistence allowance of certain positions in the Government	February 2, 1989
347	Further amending Section 2(A-1) of Executive Order No. 308, as amended, "Providing for the reorganization of the regional development councils"	February 2, 1989
348	Approving and adopting the Philippine Development Plan for Women for 1989 to 1992	February 17, 1989
349	Authorizing the department secretaries to accept, approve and sign "By authority of the President" the applications for early retirement or voluntary separation of duly qualified presidential appointees in their respective departments who wish to avail themselves of the benefits under Republic Act No. 6683	March 2, 1989
350	Providing guidelines in the processing of amnesty manifestation forms of rebel returnees	March 13, 1989
351	Assigning additional functions to the Presidential Council for Youth Affairs	March 15, 1989
352	Providing implementing guidelines for the President's 1989 Summer Youth Program (PSYP) and creating the President's Summer Youth Program Steering Committee for that purpose	March 17, 1989
353	Reducing the rates of import duty on cement and clinker under Presidential Decree No. 1464, otherwise known as the Tariff and Customs Code of 1978, as amended	March 27, 1989
354	Suspending the implementation of certain sections of Executive Order No. 782, series of 1982	March 29, 1989
355	Designating the regional director of the Department of Education, Culture and Sports as a regular member of the regional development council	May 8, 1989
356	Amending Executive Order No. 526, s. of 1979 and for other purposes	May 23, 1989
357	Strengthening the existing coordinating mechanism of the National Shelter Program of the Government under Executive Order No. 90, dated December 17, 1986	May 24, 1989
358	Revoking the designation of the Administrator of the Export Processing Zone Authority as a member of the Presidential Committee on the Philippine Nuclear Power Plant	June 2, 1989
359	Reiterating the policy and prescribing guidelines and procedures in the implementation of the provisions of Executive Order No. 285, "Abolishing the General Service Administration and transferring its functions to appropriate Government agencies" on the operation of a procurement system for common-use office supplies, materials and equipment	June 2, 1989
360	Enjoining all Government financial institutions and Government owned or controlled corporations to grant the Department of Agrarian Reform the right of first refusal in the sale or disposition of all lands owned by them which are suitable to agriculture	June 9, 1989
361	Suspending the implementation of certain provisions of Executive Order No. 782, series of 1982, in addition to the provisions thereof suspended under Executive Order No. 354, series of 1989	June 22, 1989
362	Extending the life of the Central Visayas Regional Projects Office	June 28, 1989
363	Decentralizing the coordinative and management mechanisms for the implementation of integrated area development projects	July 17, 1989
364	Modifying the rates of import duties and classifications and imposing alternative rates on certain articles under Section 104 of the Tariff and Customs Code of 1978, as amended	July 21, 1989
365	Increasing benefits and monthly contributions under the Philippine Medical Care Plan and providing for a Health Financial Assistance Program	July 28, 1989
366	Further amending Executive Order No. 308, as amended by Executive Order No. 318, both series of 1988, and for other purposes	August 8, 1989
367	Further amending Executive Order No. 129 dated May 6, 1968, as amended by Executive Order No. 421, dated November 26, 1973	August 21, 1989
368	Amending Executive Order No. 329, series of 1988, entitled "Creating appraisal committees in the Metropolitan Manila area, defining their general functions, and prescribing their procedures"	August 24, 1989
369	Reconstituting the membership of the appraisal committees created under Executive Order No. 132 dated December 27, 1937, as amended, and Executive Order No. 329 dated July 11, 1988, as amended	September 14, 1989
370	Establishing the Program to Refocus Orientation for the Poor (PRO-POOR) in low income municipalities (LIMs), providing for the implementation thereof, enjoining the active support and participation of Government departments and agencies, regional development councils (RDCs), and local government units (LGUs) thereto and for other similar purposes	September 25, 1989
371	Directing unequivocal compliance with Section 5(4), Article XVI, of the 1987 Constitution providing that "No member of the Armed Forces in the active service shall, at any time, be appointed or designated in any capacity to a civilian position in the Government including Government-owned or controlled corporations or any of their subsidiaries"	September 28, 1989
372	Modifying the rates of import duty on certain imported articles as provided under the Tariff and Customs Code of 1978, as amended, in order to implement the minimum 90% margin of preference on certain products included in the ASEAN Industrial Joint Ventures (AIJV), where the Philippines is participating, as provided for in Article III Paragraphs 1 and 5 of the Revised Basic Agreement on AIJV	September 29, 1989
373	Providing for the turn-over of the assets of the University of Life complex to the Department of Education, Culture and Sports and for other related purposes	October 17, 1989
374	Disposition of the (1) Bicol River Basin Development Program Office, (2) Bohol Integrated Area Development Project Office, (3) Cagayan Integrated Agricultural Development Project Office, (4) Mindoro Integrated Rural Development Office, and (5) Samar Integrated Rural Development Project Office	October 30, 1989
375	Constituting the Cotabato-Agusan River Basin Program Office as a project management office under the Department of Public Works and Highways	October 30, 1989
376	Establishing the Regional Project Monitoring and Evaluation System (RPMES), setting forth its objectives, defining its scope and coverage, requiring the formulation of a manual of operations and for other similar purposes	November 2, 1989
377	Providing arrangements for coordinating the handling of the bases issue and creating the President's Committee on the Bases for the purpose	November 3, 1989
378	Constituting the Committee on the Remittance System for Filipino Overseas Workers	November 23, 1989
379	Realigning the functions of supervision and control over the Integrated National Police pursuant to Section 31, Chapter 10, Book III of Executive Order No. 292	November 24, 1989
380	Revising the levels of authority on approval of Government contracts	November 27, 1989
381	Authorizing the National Power Corporation to enter into negotiated contracts beyond the present ceilings for infrastructure projects	November 27, 1989
382	Placing the Videogram Regulatory Board under the control and supervision of the Office of the President	November 28, 1989
383	Directing emergency measures to prevent excessive increases in prices of certain prime commodities in the National Capital Region	December 5, 1989
384	Providing general guidelines in the implementation of Proclamation No. 503, "Declaring a state of emergency throughout the Philippines"	December 12, 1989
385	Expanding and delineating the Batangas Port Zone and placing the same under the administrative jurisdiction of the Philippine Ports Authority	December 19, 1989
386	Establishing a National Crime Information System (NCIS), providing the mechanisms therefor and for other similar purposes	December 19, 1989
387	Suspending the rates of import duty of cement and cement clinker under Presidential Decree No. 1464, otherwise known as the Tariff and Customs Code of 1978, as amended, during the period of national emergency	December 26, 1989
388	Reorganizing the administrative structure of the Office of the Press Secretary pursuant to Section 31, Chapter 10, Title III, Book III, of the Administrative Code of 1987	December 30, 1989
389	Authorizing officials and employees of the regular agencies/offices of the National Government and of other Government-owned and/or controlled corporations to adopt the rates of per diem and allowances as authorized pursuant to Executive Order No. 151 dated March 19, 1987, as implemented by National Budget Circular No. 391 dated October 6, 1987, as amended, and ratifying for the purpose all previous payments made by National Government agencies/offices pursuant to the said issuances	December 30, 1989

== 1990 ==
No.	Title	Date signed
390	Reconstituting the Presidential Committee on the Philippine Nuclear Power Plant	January 4, 1990
391	Establishing the Presidential Coordinating System for the Executive Department	January 5, 1990
392	Constituting the Metropolitan Manila Authority, providing for its powers and functions and for other purposes	January 9, 1990
393	Reconstituting the National Action Committee on Anti-Hijacking (NACAH)	January 24, 1990
394	Further revising the basic annual rates of overseas and living quarters allowances of Foreign Service personnel	February 15, 1990
395	Establishing the President's Annual Summer Youth Program providing for the components thereof, and creating a steering committee for the purpose	February 20, 1990
396	Modifying the rates of import duty on certain imported articles as provided under the Tariff and Customs Code of 1978, as amended, in order to implement the minimum 50% margin of preference on certain products included in the Brand-to-Brand Complementation Scheme in the automotive industry under the Basic Agreement on ASEAN Industrial Complementation	March 19, 1990
397	Establishing the Samar Island Development Project Office	April 3, 1990
398	Enjoining all departments, agencies and offices of the National Government to establish their respective rewards programs	April 16, 1990
399	Increasing the rate of cash dividends to be declared by Government owned or controlled corporations subject to certain exceptions	April 24, 1990
400	Granting supplemental pensions to Social Security System (SSS) total permanent disability pensioners	April 26, 1990
401	Rules and regulations and authorized allowances covering official travel abroad of Government personnel under the category of conference, special missions, and other non-study trips	April 26, 1990
402	Granting medical care benefits to Social Security System old-age pensioners and their dependents	April 27, 1990
403	Establishing the Tripartite Industrial Peace Council	May 30, 1990
404	Extending the effectivity of the rates of import duties on certain articles under Section 104 of Presidential Decree No. 1464, otherwise known as the Tariff and Customs Code of 1978, as modified by National Emergency Memorandum Order No. 8, series of 1990	June 8, 1990
405	Vesting in the Land Bank of the Philippines the primary responsibility to determine the land valuation and compensation for all lands covered under Republic Act No. 6657, known as the Comprehensive Agrarian Reform Law of 1988	June 14, 1990
406	Mandating certain departments and agencies to align their respective programs and projects with the Comprehensive Agrarian Reform Program, directing the Department of Agrarian Reform to accelerate the agrarian reform beneficiaries development through the provision of economic and social infrastructure support, and providing the necessary implementing mechanisms for the purpose	June 14, 1990
407	Accelerating the acquisition and distribution of agricultural lands, pasture lands, fishponds, agro-forestry lands and other lands of the public domain suitable for agriculture	June 14, 1990
408	Placing the Commission on Population under the control and supervision of the Office of the President	June 18, 1990
409	Modifying the rates of import duty on certain imported articles as provided under the Tariff and Customs Code of 1978, as amended, in order to implement the decisions of the Third ASEAN Summit and the Twenty-Seventh Meeting of the Committee on Trade and Tourism to provide a minimum level of 25% margin of preference to certain items which are contained in the Philippine exclusion list and to deepen the margin of preference in respect of certain items which are under the ASEAN Preferential Trading Arrangements (PTA) to 50% within five years	June 18, 1990
410	Providing for new guidelines for the processing of applications for port zone delineation	July 3, 1990
411	Reconstituting the Bagong Kilusang Kabuhayan at Kaunlaran (BKKK) Committee in the Office of the President, now known as the National Livelihood Support Fund (NSLF) Council	July 13, 1990
412	Institutionalizing the Energy Conservation Inter-Agency Committee	July 13, 1990
413	Modifying the rates of import duty and nomenclature of certain imported articles under Section 104 of the Tariff and Customs Code of 1978, (Presidential Decree No. 1464), as amended	July 19, 1990
414	Directing emergency measures to prevent excessive increases in prices of prime and essential commodities and to protect the people from hoarding, profiteering, injurious speculations, manipulations of prices, and other pernicious practices in areas severely stricken by the recent earthquake	July 19, 1990
415	Lifting the Daylight Saving Time (DST) Program instituted under the National Emergency Memorandum Order No. 17, series of 1990, effective midnight of July 28, 1990	July 20, 1990
416	Transferring the function of issuing licenses or permits for treasure-hunting from the Department of Environment and Natural Resources to the Office of the President	July 31, 1990
417	Reconstituting the Central Visayas Regional Projects (CVRP) Board	August 9, 1990
418	Directing the immediate implementation of an energy conservation program	August 13, 1990
419	Promulgating the rules and regulations to implement Republic Act No. 6960 entitled "An Act appropriating the sum of ten billion pesos for the aid, relief, and rehabilitation services to persons and areas affected and for the survey, repair and reconstruction of Government infrastructure damaged or destroyed by the earthquakes of July 16, 1990 and their aftershocks"	August 22, 1990
420	Converting the Philippine High School for the Arts into a regular Government agency, repealing Presidential Decree No. 1287 and for other purposes	September 7, 1990
421	Instituting the Presidential Award for Heroism in Times of Disaster	September 7, 1990
422	Activating and reorganizing the Energy Operations Board as the administrative machinery for the efficient and equitable allocation and distribution of energy under certain conditions	September 11, 1990
423	Directing measures to prevent excessive increases in the prices of certain prime commodities in the National Capital Region	October 4, 1990
424	Placing the control and supervision of the offices of the Department of Public Works and Highways within the Autonomous Region in Muslim Mindanao under the Autonomous Regional Government, and for other purposes	October 4, 1990
425	Placing under the control and supervision of the Autonomous Regional Government the line agencies and offices of the National Government within the Autonomous Region in Muslim Mindanao dealing with labor and employment, local government, tourism, environment and natural resources, social welfare and development, and science and technology, and for other purposes	October 12, 1990
426	Placing the control and supervision of the offices of the Department of Public Works and Highways within the Autonomous Region in Muslim Mindanao under the Autonomous Regional Government, and for other purposes	October 12, 1990
427	Placing the control and supervision of barter trade in Jolo, Sulu with the Regional Government of the Autonomous Region in Muslim Mindanao, and for other purposes	October 12, 1990
428	Adopting a formula in determining the annual assistance for five years of the Autonomous Regional Government in Muslim Mindanao, and for other purposes	October 12, 1990
429	Providing for the reorganization of the administrative regions in Mindanao, and for other purposes	October 12, 1990
430	Constituting the National Committee on Biosafety of the Philippines (NCBP) and for other purposes	October 15, 1990
431	Further expanding the delineated Batangas Port Zone as provided for under Executive Order No. 385, dated December 19, 1989	October 19, 1990
432	Ordering the strict enforcement of Presidential Decree No. 825 providing penalties for improper disposal of garbage and other forms of uncleanliness	October 23, 1990
433	Directing the immediate implementation of additional energy conservation measures	November 2, 1990
434	Prescribing guidelines for the participation of relief agencies and volunteer-organizations with proven record in providing relief work in the implementation of livelihood and social services aid to earthquake victims	November 8, 1990
435	Reconstituting the Committee on the Remittance System for Filipino Overseas Workers created under Executive Order No. 378 dated November 23, 1989	November 15, 1990
436	Directing measures to prevent excessive increases in prices of certain prime and essential commodities and to protect the people from hoarding, profiteering, injurious speculations, manipulation of prices, and other pernicious practices in areas where a state of public calamity has been declared due to Typhoon "Ruping"	November 22, 1990
437	Increasing the tax on rentals, charter and other fees earned by non-resident lessors of aircraft from 7.5% to 8.5% pursuant to Subparagraph 4, Section 25 (B) of the National Internal Revenue Code, as amended	November 23, 1990
438	Imposing an additional duty of five percent (5%) ad valorem on all imported articles subject to certain exceptions and conditions	November 27, 1990
439	Modifying Executive Order No. 429, series of 1990, entitled "Providing for the reorganization of the administrative regions in Mindanao, and for other purposes"	December 7, 1990
440	Increasing the price ceilings for sugar in the National Capital Region	December 19, 1990
441	Increasing medicare benefits under the Philippine Medical Care Plan	December 21, 1990

== 1991 ==
No.	Title	Date signed
442	Creating the Presidential Complaints and Action Office in the Office of the President	January 3, 1991
443	Imposing an additional duty of nine percent (9%) ad valorem on all imported articles subject to certain exceptions and conditions	January 3, 1991
444	Designating the chairmen of the peace and order councils of provinces, cities and municipalities and the Regional Governor of the Autonomous Region in Muslim Mindanao as chief action officers for the effective implementation of the contingency measures for the Middle East crisis	January 9, 1991
445	Increasing the price ceilings for certain prime and essential commodities in the National Capital Region under Executive Order No. 423, as amended, series of 1990	January 10, 1991
446	Reorganizing the Office of the President including its immediate offices, the Presidential Assistants/Advisers System, and the Common Staff Support System	January 16, 1991
447	Renaming the Presidential Complaints and Action Office as Presidential Action Center	February 5, 1991
448	Amending Executive Order No. 407, series of 1990, entitled "Accelerating the acquisition and distribution of agricultural lands, pasture lands, fishponds, agro-forestry lands and other lands of the public domain suitable for agriculture"	February 14, 1991
449	Lifting the price ceilings of certain prime and essential commodities in areas affected by the July 16, 1990 earthquake and Typhoon Ruping imposed pursuant to Executive Orders Nos. 414 and 436, series of 1990	March 4, 1991
450	Lifting the ban on new applications for licenses to operate private employment agencies engaged in recruitment and placement of Filipino workers for overseas employment	March 19, 1991
451	Lifting the price ceilings for certain prime and essential commodities in the National Capital Region under Executive Order No. 423, series of 1990, as amended	April 1, 1991
452	Reconstituting the National Action Committee on Anti-Hijacking	April 5, 1991
453	Prescribing a maximum amount of compensation that can be received by Government-nominated directors to corporations	April 19, 1991
454	Extending the period for the general registration of firearms	April 22, 1991
455	Further amending Section 3(A), of Executive Order No. 308, as amended, series of 1987	April 26, 1991
456	Revoking Executive Order No. 423, series of 1990, as amended	April 30, 1991
457	Fixing the compensation of members of the regional tripartite wages and productivity boards	May 7, 1991
458	Devolving the powers and functions of the Board of Investments over investments within the Autonomous Region in Muslim Mindanao to the Autonomous Regional Government and for other purposes	May 17, 1991
459	Devolving to the Autonomous Regional Government of the Autonomous Region in Muslim Mindanao certain powers and functions of the Department of Education, Culture and Sports, the control and supervision over its offices in the region and for other purposes	May 17, 1991
460	Devolving to the Autonomous Regional Government of the Autonomous Region in Muslim Mindanao the powers and functions of the Department of Agriculture the control and supervision over its offices in the region and for other purposes	May 17, 1991
461	Devolving certain powers and functions of the Housing and Land Use Regulatory Board and the National Housing Authority to the Autonomous Regional Government of the Autonomous Region in Muslim Mindanao, and for other purposes	May 17, 1991
462	Devolving to the Autonomous Regional Government of the Autonomous Region in Muslim Mindanao the powers and functions of the Office for Southern Cultural Communities, the control and supervision over its offices in the region and for other purposes	May 17, 1991
463	Establishing the relationship between the Regional Planning and Development Board of the Autonomous Regional Government and the National Economic and Development Authority (NEDA) Board	May 17, 1991
464	Establishing the relationship between the National Statistical Coordination Board and the Autonomous Regional Government in the Autonomous Region in Muslim Mindanao	May 17, 1991
465	Providing for the abolition of certain Government corporations, granting the Board of Liquidators certain powers and authorities relative thereto, and for other purposes	June 13, 1991
466	Assigning to the Department of Foreign Affairs the sole use and occupancy of the former Asian Development Bank (ADB) building and premises	June 21, 1991
467	Directing measures to prevent unreasonable increases in the prices of certain prime and essential commodities in areas affected by the eruption and other volcanic activities of Mt. Pinatubo	June 26, 1991
468	Providing for the dissolution of the Revenue Information Systems Services, Inc. (RISSI), authorizing the Bureau of Internal Revenue to establish an efficient computer and communications network system and for other purposes	July 3, 1991
469	Creating National Coordinating Committee for the 1992 UN Conference on Environment and Development (UNCED)	July 16, 1991
470	Modifying the nomenclature and rates of import duty of certain imported articles under Section 104 of the Tariff and Customs Code of 1978 (Presidential Decree No. 1464), as amended	July 20, 1991
471	Amending Executive Order No. 319 series of 1987, entitled "Providing for the reorganization of the local development councils"	July 23, 1991
472	Suspending the application of the tariff concessions granted by the Philippines on refractory bricks under the ASEAN Preferential Trading Arrangements	August 1, 1991
473	Establishment of sea lanes for the use of fishing vessels in proceeding to and from their fishing areas in the South Pacific Ocean, subject to certain conditions	August 5, 1991
474	Establishing the coordinative and management mechanism for the implementation of the South Cotabato/General Santos City Area Development Project	August 12, 1991
476	Placing the Commission on Population under National Economic and Development Authority	August 14, 1991
475	Reducing the rate of additional duty prescribed in Executive Order No. 443, series of 1991, to five percent (5%) ad valorem	August 15, 1991
477	Amending Executive Order No. 6 dated 12 March 1986, as amended, prescribing procedures relative to requests of Government officials and employees for authority to travel abroad	August 21, 1991
478	Imposing special duties on crude oil and oil products under Section 104 of the Tariff and Customs Code of the Philippines, as amended	August 23, 1991
479	Amending Executive Order No. 442, series of 1991, as amended, for the purpose of strengthening and streamlining the Presidential Action Center	August 27, 1991
480	Amending Executive Order No. 474, series of 1991	September 16, 1991
481	Devolving to the Autonomous Regional Government of the Autonomous Region for Muslim Mindanao certain powers and functions of the Department of Trade and Industry and the control and supervision over its offices within the region	September 24, 1991
482	Devolving to the Autonomous Regional Government of the Autonomous Region for Muslim Mindanao the powers and functions of the Department of Agrarian Reform and the control and supervision over its offices within the region	September 24, 1991
483	Reorganizing the Office of the President in accordance with the Administrative Code of 1987	September 30, 1991
484	Amending Executive Order No. 443, as amended, by exempting capital equipment and spare parts imported by firms engaged in preferred areas of activity whose projects were registered with the Board of Investments on or before January 2, 1991 from the additional duty of five percent ad valorem	October 18, 1991
485	Further extending the operational existence of the Central Visayas Regional Projects Office (CVRPO) and for other purposes	October 31, 1991
486	Establishing a Performance-Based Incentive System for Government-owned or controlled corporations and for other purposes	November 8, 1991
487	Constituting a Philippine Claims and Compensation Committee for the reparation for damages, deaths, injuries, and losses suffered by individuals, companies and Government as a result of the Iraqi invasion of Kuwait	November 21, 1991
488	Constituting the Presidential Coordinating Committee on the Prawn Industry	November 22, 1991
489	Institutionalizing the Inter-Agency Committee on Environmental Health	November 22, 1991
490	Transferring the Commission on Filipinos Overseas from the Office of the President to the Department of Foreign Affairs	November 26, 1991
491	Requiring all Government agencies including Government-owned and controlled corporations in Metropolitan Manila to use prescribed plastic bags in disposing garbage and other waste material	November 28, 1991
492	Transforming the Instructional Materials Corporation into a regular Government agency to be known as the Instructional Materials Development Center and for other purposes	November 29, 1991
493	Removing red tape and reducing clearance requirements for interisland vessels	December 3, 1991
494	Reorganizing certain Government-owned or controlled corporations and for other purposes	December 6, 1991
495	Converting the Philippine Shippers' Council, the Boy Scouts of the Philippines and the Girl Scouts of the Philippines into private corporations and for other purposes	December 6, 1991
496	Instituting procedures and criteria for the selection and the recommendation of nominees for appointment to vacant positions in the professional regulatory boards under the supervision of the Professional Regulation Commission	December 9, 1991
497	Transferring the Nayong Pilipino Foundation from the Presidential Management Staff, Office of the President, to the Department of Tourism	December 16, 1991
498	Institutionalizing the Presidential Awards for Filipino Individuals and Organizations Overseas	December 19, 1991
499	Creating an Export and Investment Development Council defining its composition, powers and functions	December 23, 1991
500	Granting medical care benefits to unemployed permanent partial disability pensioners, who are no longer covered under the Medicare Program, and their dependents	December 27, 1991

== 1992 ==
No.	Title	Date signed
501	Increasing the Medicare benefits under the Philippine Medical Care Plan	January 1, 1992
502	Amending Letter of Instructions No. 911, as amended, and Letter of Instructions No. 1093, as amended, governing the admission to and/or stay in the country of temporary visitors who are holders of Hongkong-British, Macao-Portuguese, People's Republic of China or Taipei passports or certificates of identity	January 8, 1992
503	Providing for the rules and regulations implementing the transfer of personnel and assets, liabilities and records of National Government agencies whose functions are to be devolved to the local government units and for other related purposes	January 22, 1992
504	Amending Executive Order No. 338 dated 30 September 1988 creating the Energy Coordinating Council	January 31, 1992
505	Further amending Executive Order No. 308 (s. 1987), as amended by Executive Orders Nos. 318 (s. 1988), 347 and 366 (s. 1989) and 455 (s. 1991), providing for the reorganization of the regional development councils	February 12, 1992
506	Further amending Executive Order No. 407, series of 1990, amended by Executive Order No. 148, series of 1991, "accelerating the acquisition and distribution of agricultural lands, pasture lands, fishponds, agro-forestry lands and other lands of the public domain suitable for agriculture"	February 18, 1992
507	Directing the transfer of fiscal year 1992 appropriations for devolved services and facilities of concerned National Government departments and agencies to the internal revenue allotment, enjoining local government units to revise their 1992 annual budgets accordingly and instructing the Secretary of Budget and Management to issue the rules and regulations to be observed for the purpose, all pursuant to the provisions of the Local Government Code of 1992	February 24, 1992
508	Instituting the Lingkod Bayan Award as the Presidential Award for Outstanding Public Service	March 2, 1992
509	Amending Executive Order No. 495, series of 1991, by excluding from the coverage thereof the Boy Scouts of the Philippines and for other purposes	March 4, 1992
510	Creating the AFTA Multisectoral Study Commission	March 16, 1992
511	Creating an interim inter-agency task force to provide for private sector participation in the establishment of agro-industrial development areas	March 16, 1992
512	Providing for the creation of the Mindanao Economic Development Council and for other purposes	March 19, 1992
513	Converting the Marcos Golf Foundation of the Philippines into a private foundation and for other purposes	March 25, 1992
514	Further amending Executive Order No. 495, series of 1991, as amended, by providing for the regularization of the Philippine Shippers' Council	March 26, 1992
515	Transferring the Bagong Pagkain ng Bayan Program to the Technology Resource Center (TRC) and rationalizing its mandate and organization	April 14, 1992
516	Extending the deadline for filing of 1991 incometax returns from April 15, 1992 to April 24, 1992	April 15, 1992
517	Lifting the additional duty of five (5%) percent ad valorem imposed through Executive Order No. 443, as amended, on all imported articles subject to certain exceptions and conditions	April 30, 1992
518	Amending certain provisions of Executive Order No. 486 dated 8 November 1991 establishing a Performance-Based Incentive System for Government-owned or controlled corporations and for other purposes	May 29, 1992
519	Designating the regional director of the Department of Tourism as regular member of the regional development council	May 29, 1992
520	Amending Executive Order No. 499 dated December 23, 1991 creating an Export and Investment Development Council defining its composition, powers and functions, to include in the council the Secretary of Foreign Affairs	May 29, 1992
521	Creating the National Organizing Committee for the Twenty-Fifth ASEAN Ministerial Meeting (AMM) and Post Ministerial Conference (PMC), to be held in Manila on 21-26 July 1992	June 9, 1992
522	Amending Executive Order No. 60, series of 1967, prescribing rules and regulations for the control and supervision of the importation, sale and possession of chemicals used as ingredients in the manufacture of explosives and for other purposes	June 26, 1992
