= Howard Calleja =

Filipino lawyer, political activist and professor

Howard "Howie" Maceda Calleja (born December 21, 1966) is a Filipino lawyer, political activist and professor. He has served as legal counsel for various advocacy groups and former victims of martial law under Ferdinand Marcos. Calleja also served as co-convenor of 1Sambayan, a political organization that sought to unite the opposition beginning with the 2022 elections.

== Early life and education ==
Calleja was born in Quezon City on December 21, 1966 to cardiologist Homobono Belen Calleja (1929–2021) and Ella Alma Maceda Calleja (1931–2018). His grandfather, Ambrosio Calleja, was a member of the 1934 Constitutional Convention, while his uncle, Ernesto Maceda, was a former Philippine senator. His great-grandfather, Marcial Calleja, served as Albay representative for the Malolos Congress of the Philippine Revolutionary Government in the 1890s.

Growing up, Calleja played golf with his father as their Sunday pastime. In the 1980s, Calleja attended high school at La Salle Green Hills. Calleja graduated from the University of Santo Tomas with a Bachelor of Science degree in physical therapy in 1989, and later received his Juris Doctor degree from the Ateneo de Manila University School of Law in 1994, passing the Philippine Bar Examination in 1995. Calleja acquired his Master of Laws degree at the Duke University School of Law in North Carolina in 1997, later passing the New York State Bar Examination in 2005.

== Career ==
Calleja worked as the chief of staff of Representative Imelda "Emily" R. Lopez of Guimaras's lone district from 1998 to 2001.

In the 2000s, Calleja was a law partner at the Maceda, Calanog Law Office. In 2008, Calleja founded the law firm Calleja, Peralta, Jimenez, San Luis, Uy & Ulibas (Callejo Law Office), where he is the senior managing partner.

In July 2020, Calleja and other civic groups filed the first petition (out of 37) before the Supreme Court that challenged the legality of the Anti-Terrorism Act of 2020. In the same month, he began writing the "Howie See It" column for The Philippine Business and News website.

In March 2021, Calleja became co-convenor of 1Sambayan, a newly-established political organization that initially sought to unite the opposition for the 2022 elections. Because of his role in the group, Calleja received various threats and extortion attempts in the year leading up to the election.

== Personal life ==
Calleja married Marla Ticzon in 2004. He currently resides in Barangay San Lorenzo, Makati City.
