= Algamar Latiph =

Filipino lawyer

Algamar A. Latiph is a Filipino human rights lawyer was the former Chairperson of the Regional Human Rights Commission in Autonomous Region in Muslim Mindanao and an advocate for the rights of Moro people in the Bangsamoro Autonomous Region in Muslim Mindanao (BARMM) in the Philippines.

== Education ==
Latiph passed the Philippine bar exam in 2000. In 2007, he completed a three-month Chevening Fellowships for Islam and Governance at the University of Birmingham in the United Kingdom.

== Career ==
In the 2000s, Latiph chaired the Muslim Youth and Students Alliance in Manila.

Latiph chaired the Regional Human Rights Commission (RHRC) of the Autonomous Region in Muslim Mindanao (ARMM) in the 2010s, with the organization conducting an investigation with the Commission on Human Rights (CHR) into the ill-fated police operation in Mamasapano, Maguindanao in 2015. In 2016, he is part of those petitioned for the Supreme Court in Ocampo vs Enriquez for the applicability of Transitional Justice Mechanism which is RA 10368. Latiph also served as a legal consultant in the Bangsamoro Transition Commission that drafted the 2018 Bangsamoro Organic Law establishing the Bangsamoro Autonomous Region in Muslim Mindanao (BARMM).

In July 2020, Latiph and three other Muslim lawyers filed the 16th petition (out of 37) before the Supreme Court that challenged the legality of the Anti-Terrorism Act of 2020. During his oral argument in February 2021, Latiph asked the court to decide on the petitions "in the name of liberty and love".

Upon Muslim actor Robin Padilla's election to the Senate in 2022, Latiph was hired as his chief legislative officer but resigned after one year in August 2023 for policy differences. During his tenure, Latiph assisted in the creation of a Senate bill that sought to strengthen the powers of the Movie and Television Review and Classification Board (MTRCB) in classifying media. In 2023, Latiph tendered his irrevocable resignation due to policy differences.

== Personal life ==
Latiph is married to fellow lawyer Maisara Dandamun-Latiph from Manila, who advocates for better education as well as women and children's rights; they have two children.
