= Anti-Subversion Act of 1957 =

Congress of the Philippines
- Long title: An Act To Outlaw The Communist Party Of The Philippines And Similar Associations, Penalizing Membership Therein, And For Other Purposes
- Territorial extent: Philippines
- Signed by: Carlos P. Garcia
- Signed: June 20, 1957
- Effective: June 20, 1957
- Repealed: 1992

Related legislation
- Anti-Terrorism Act of 2020
- Status: Repealed

The Anti-Subversion Act of 1957, officially designated as Republic Act No. 1700, is a Philippine law which outlawed the Communist Party of the Philippines of 1930 (Partido Komunista ng Pilipinas-1930), the Hukbalahap, and any organizations succeeding these two organizations including the Communist Party of the Philippines, the National Democratic Front of the Philippines, and the New People's Army, on the grounds that these groups are involved in a "conspiracy to overthrow the government and imposed a totalitarian regime". It also prohibited association with these groups.

== History ==
The Anti-Subversion Act of 1957, or the Republic Act (RA) No. 1700, was signed into law by then President Carlos P. Garcia on June 20, 1957. It was enacted into law during the peak of the Hukbalahap's Communist rebellion in the 1950s. It was meant for the Partido Komunista ng Pilipinas-1930 (PKP-1930) and its leaders are punishable by death penalty under the law. However no PKP leader was formally executed under the Anti-Subversion Act.

The legislation was superseded during the Martial Law period under President Ferdinand Marcos. Marcos issued Presidential Decree (PD) 885 in 1976 and PD 1835 in 1981. Through PD 885, Marcos expanded the Anti-Subversion Act by including organizations that were meant for the purpose of overthrowing the national government.

The Anti-Subversion Act was revived by President Corazon Aquino in 1987 through Executive Order 167 which also repealed the two presidential decrees issued by Marcos. The law was repealed again in 1992 by President Fidel V. Ramos through RA 7636 which meant that subversion is no longer a crime, but sedition remained illegal.

== Revival ==
In 2019, Department of the Interior and Local Government Secretary Eduardo Año proposed the revival of the Anti-Subversion Act in a bid to end the communist rebellion in the Philippines in response to reports of students being recruited by front organizations of Communist rebels. The proposal was criticized due to potential of the government to abuse the law by lumping dissenters and critics with New People's Army rebels.

== See also ==
- Communist Control Act of 1954 in the United States
