= Bangsamoro Sports Commission =

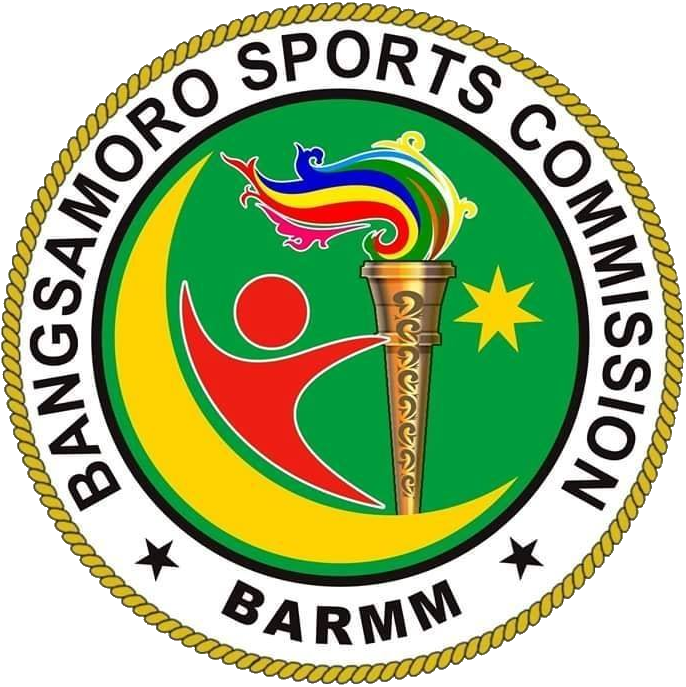
- Seal

Agency overview
- Formed: 2019
- Agency executive: Chairperson
- Parent Agency: Office of the Chief Minister of Bangsamoro
- Key document: Bangsamoro Autonomy Act No. 12

The Bangsamoro Sports Commission (BSC) is a regional government agency which tackles affairs related to sports in the Bangsamoro Autonomous Region in Muslim Mindanao (BARMM) of the Philippines.

== History ==
The Bangsamoro Organic Law, the charter legislation of the Bangsamoro, mandates for the creation of the Bangsamoro Sports Commission (BSC) which would support and oversee the development of sports in the autonomous region. The BSC was created sometime in 2019 and was already organizing a sports peace caravan with the Philippine Sports Commission late that year.

The Bangsamoro Transition Authority Parliament passed Committee Bill No. 52, which institutionalizes the sports commission on September 17, 2020. The bill became known as the Bangsamoro Autonomy Act No. 12 and was signed into law by Chief Minister Murad Ebrahim on October 5, 2020.

== Administration ==
The Bangsamoro Sports Commission is an attached agency to the Office of the Chief Minister. The BSC is also independent from its national equivalent, the Philippine Sports Commission. It is headed by a chairperson with six commissioners, two of which are ex-officio officials. All officials are appointed by the region's Chief Minister.

The six commissioners represent six constituents in the Bangsamoro region namely"

- Basilan
- Lanao del Sur
- Maguindanao, Cotabato City and the special geographic area
- Sulu
- Non-Moro indigenous people
- Settler communities
