= Anti-Terrorism Act of 2020 =

Philippine legislation

Congress of the Philippines
- Long title: An Act to Prevent, Prohibit and Penalize Terrorism, Thereby Repealing Republic Act No. 9372, Otherwise Known as the "Human Security Act of 2007"
- Citation: Republic Act No. 11479
- Territorial extent: Philippines
- Passed by: Senate of the Philippines
- Passed: February 26, 2020 (19–2–3)
- Passed by: House of Representatives of the Philippines
- Passed: June 5, 2020 (168–36–29)
- Signed by: Rodrigo Duterte
- Signed: July 3, 2020
- Commenced: October 16, 2020
- Effective: July 18, 2020

Legislative history

Initiating chamber: Senate of the Philippines
- Bill title: Anti-Terrorism Act of 2020
- Bill citation: Senate Bill No. 1083
- Introduced by: Tito Sotto, Ping Lacson, Imee Marcos, et al.
- Introduced: September 30, 2019
- Voting summary: 19 voted for; 2 voted against; 1 absent; 2 present not voting

Revising chamber: House of Representatives of the Philippines
- Bill title: Anti-Terrorism Act of 2020
- Bill citation: House Bill No. 6875
- Received from the Senate of the Philippines: May 30, 2020
- Member(s) in charge: Narciso Bravo Jr. (Masbate–1st), Raul Tupas (Iloilo–5th), et al.
- Voting summary: 168 voted for; 36 voted against; 29 abstained

Repeals
- Human Security Act of 2007
- Status: In force

The Anti-Terrorism Act of 2020, officially designated as Republic Act No. 11479, is a counter-terrorism law intended to prevent, prohibit, and penalize terrorism in the Philippines. The law was passed by the 18th Congress and signed by President Rodrigo Duterte on July 3, 2020, effectively replacing the Human Security Act of 2007 on July 18, 2020.

A total of 37 petitions were filed before the Supreme Court of the Philippines challenging the law's constitutionality, making it the most assailed piece of legislation in Philippine history. On December 9, 2021, the Court announced that apart from two unconstitutional portions of the law, all other challenged provisions thereof are declared not unconstitutional.

== Overview ==
=== Definition of terrorism ===
The Act defines terrorism as:

- Engaging in acts intended to cause death or serious bodily injury to any person or endangers a person's life;
- Engaging in acts intended to cause extensive damage or destruction to a government or public facility, public place, or private property;
- Engaging in acts intended to cause extensive interference with, damage, or destruction to critical infrastructure;
- Developing, manufacturing, possessing, acquiring, transporting, supplying, or using weapons; and
- Releasing dangerous substances or causing fire, floods or explosions when the purpose is to intimidate the general public, create an atmosphere to spread a message of fear, provoke or influence by intimidation the government or any international organization, seriously destabilize or destroy the fundamental political, economic, or social structures in the country, or create a public emergency or seriously undermine public safety

The definition states that "advocacy, protest, dissent, stoppage of work, industrial or mass action, and other similar exercises of civil and political rights" shall not be considered as terrorist acts only if they "are not intended to cause death or serious physical harm to a person, to endanger a person's life, or to create a serious risk to public safety."

=== Creation of Anti-Terrorism Council ===
The law also creates a presidentially-appointed body, the Anti-Terrorism Council (ATC), which would designate the persons who could be arrested as "terrorists."

Because of other provisions of the law. these persons could be detained for up to 24 days (14 days with a possible 10-day extension), and would not be automatically compensated for wrongful imprisonment as they originally were under the Human Security Act of 2007.

=== Warrantless arrest ===
The law allows suspects to be detained without a judicial warrant of arrest for 14 days and can be extended by 10 more days, and placed under surveillance for 60 days, that can also be extended by up to 30 days, by the police or military. But an analyst argues that this provision is essential for counterterrorism to "allow more time for investigators to get valuable information from the terror suspect. A longer detention period can also provide ample time to facilitate interrogation. It can also incapacitate the suspected terrorist from wreaking havoc. Most importantly, longer preventive detention can lawfully hold suspect when usual criminal charges cannot be filed for some technical considerations."

=== Removal of safeguard against wrongful detention ===
The Anti-Terrorism Act of 2020 also removes a section under the Human Security Act of 2007 which is meant to safeguard against the wrongful accusation and detention of suspects. Previously, if a person imprisoned under the HSA were found to actually not be guilty, that person would be compensated for wrongful detention, with the cost "automatically charged against the appropriations of the police agency or the Anti-Terrorism Council that brought or sanctioned the filing of the charges against the accused."

Under the new law, a wrongfully detained person would have to file a suit against the government in order to get any remuneration for having been wrongfully accused.

=== Use against activists and human rights workers ===
Shortly before the signing of the law, Human Rights Watch said that "The Anti-Terrorism Act is a human rights disaster in the making". Human rights advocates criticize the law for having been used to jail or harass activists and human rights workers. Human rights lawyer Maria Sol Taule said that the law is used "to censor, intimidate, and silence critics by burdening them with the cost of legal defense until they abandoned their criticism or opposition". Amnesty International said that the law is "deeply flawed and open to abuse by government authorities". As of 2023, the law has been used to charge 13 human rights activists in the Southern Tagalog region.

In 2025, Kabataan party-list Rep. Renee Co and ACT Teachers party-list Rep. Antonio Tinio stated that, "For five years, the Terror Law has been used to criminalize dissent and suppress legitimate struggles for justice, freedom, and genuine social change. The broad and vague definition of 'terrorism' has allowed state forces to arbitrarily tag individuals and organizations as 'terrorists'. The chilling effect of this law has undermined the work of human rights defenders, journalists, teachers, students, and grassroots organizers".

Human rights group Karapatan said that "Under Marcos Jr., the Anti-Terrorism Act of 2020 and the Terrorism Financing Prevention and Suppression Act of 2012 have been aggressively enforced not to protect the public, but to persecute critics and suppress dissent". Human Rights Watch had previously criticized the Anti-Terrorism Act signed by President Rodrigo Duterte in 2020, describing the law as a "human rights disaster in the making" that opens the door to "arbitrary arrests and long prison sentences for people or representatives of organizations that have displeased the president". In 2026, journalist Frenchie Mae Cumpio and activist Marielle Domequil were convicted of financing terrorism. Press freedom advocates described the conviction as a "travesty of justice".

== Background ==
=== Branding of "rebel groups" in Philippine history ===
Conflicts with ideologically motivated groups, both armed and unarmed have frequently been labeled "terrorists," "rebels," and "bandits" throughout the Philippines' history.

==== Groups branded "insurrectos" during the colonial era and World War II ====
During the colonial era, forces fighting for Filipino independence, such as those under Diego Silang, Andres Bonifacio, Emilio Aguinaldo, and Macario Sakay were intentionally labeled "insurrectos" and "bandits" in order to de-legitimize and downplay their cause. In the 1930s, the Hukbalahap of the Partido Komunista ng Pilipinas (PKP-1930) was one of the most active guerrilla forces fighting for Filipino freedom during World War II, but it found itself in conflict with the newly independent Philippine government after the war, until it was effectively defeated in the 1950s.

==== Opposition groups during the Marcos administration ====
A new communist organization, the Communist Party of the Philippines (CPP), was formed in 1969, and although it was still small, the Philippine government used its formation to take advantage of the cold war red scare in the United States to increase the influx of defense support funds from the US. A 1968 Philippine senate investigation into the Jabidah massacre, in which Muslim recruits were supposedly massacred in Corregidor to prevent them from blowing the cover on a botched Military operation resulted in the rise of multiple secessionist movements in the Muslim-majority areas in western Mindanao Island, including the Muslim Independence Movement, the Bangsamoro Liberation Organization. President Ferdinand Marcos cited the new communist and moro separatist movements among his reasons for declaring martial law in 1972, but also used his powers to "emasculate all the leaders" of the political opposition, allowing him to hold authoritarian power over the Philippines for more than two decades.

While martial law decimated the leadership of the political opposition, it radicalized otherwise "moderate" young people of the time, leading to the rapid growth of the Communist Party of the Philippines' New People's Army. In western Mindanao, the Moro National Liberation Front (MNLF) and the Moro Islamic Liberation Front (MILF) became the dominant voice of Muslim separatism after the burning of Jolo in 1974. In northern Luzon, the murder of Macli-ing Dulag for his opposition to the Marcos administration's Chico River Dam project became a rallying cry which inspired the formation of militant groups such as the Cordillera People's Liberation Army (CPLA).

On the other hand, the martial law saw the creation of human rights advocacy groups across the whole political spectrum, with civil society groups such as the Movement of Concerned Citizens for Civil Liberties and the Free Legal Assistance Group were joined even by church groups such as the National Council of Churches in the Philippines, Association of Major Religious Superiors in the Philippines, and Catholic Bishops' Conference of the Philippines, and by business groups such as the Makati Business Club, in actively fighting the proliferation of human rights abuses during the period.

==== Conflicts after 1986 ====
After Marcos was removed from power through the mostly-peaceful People Power revolution of 1986, the Reform the Armed Forces Movement launched numerous coups to overthrow the government, while conflicts continued with the MNLF, MILF, CCP, and smaller groups like the CPLA. Ideological differences in the CCP resulted in various groups who rejected its adherence to Maoist orthodoxy splitting into more than a dozen smaller groups, including the Revolutionary Workers' Party of the Philippines.

==== Red-tagging ====
In recent years, international organizations including the United Nations, Amnesty International, and Human Rights Watch have called attention to the continued practice of red-tagging as a political tactic to stifle dissent in the Philippines. The practice, under which individuals or groups are labeled "communist" or "terrorist" regardless of their actual beliefs or affiliations, has been noted for frequently targeting human rights organizations, church or religious groups, health worker unions, the academe, and the mainstream media.

=== Religious extremist terrorism ===
Brothers Abdurajik Abubakar Janjalani and Khadaffy Janjalani split from the MNLF in 1991 and established their own group, the Abu Sayyaf, which eventually became infamous for bombings, kidnappings, assassinations, extortion, rape, child sexual assault, forced marriage, drive-by shootings, extortion and drug trafficking. On July 23, 2014, Abu Sayyaf leader Isnilon Hapilon swore an oath of loyalty to Abu Bakr al-Baghdadi, the leader of the Islamic State of Iraq and the Levant (ISIL). In September 2014, the group began kidnapping people for ransom, in the name of ISIL.

However, in the leadup to the passage and signing of the Anti-Terror Act of 2020, President Rodrigo Duterte said that his administration would focus on "communists." He called the Abu Sayyaf "terrorists of no value," saying "Actually the number one threat to the country, hindi Abu Sayyaf, hindi mga terorista of no value. Itong high-value targets itong mga komunista" ("Actually the number one threat to the country is not the Abu Sayyaf Group, not terrorists of no value. The high-value targets are the communists").

== Legislative history ==
=== Human Security Act of 2007 ===
The Anti-Terrorism Act of 2020 repeals the Human Security Act of 2007, making changes to some of the provisions as well as the definitions under terrorism. Senator Panfilo Lacson, one of the principal authors of the Anti-Terrorism Act of 2020, said that the Human Security Act of 2007 was a "dead letter law" because it has been "severely underutilized" as it only resulted in a single convicted felon and had only one proscribed organization: the Abu Sayyaf.

=== Senate Bill No. 1083 ===
The bill was prepared by the Committees on National Defense and Security; Peace, Unification and Reconciliation; and Finance with the following as authors:

- Panfilo Lacson
- Lito Lapid
- Imee Marcos
- Bong Revilla
- Ronald "Bato" dela Rosa
- Tito Sotto

It was approved by the Senate on February 26, 2020 with the following 19 voting in the affirmative:

- Sonny Angara
- Nancy Binay
- Pia Cayetano
- Ronald "Bato" dela Rosa
- Minority Leader Franklin Drilon
- Win Gatchalian
- Bong Go
- Dick Gordon
- Panfilo Lacson
- Lito Lapid
- Imee Marcos
- Manny Pacquiao
- Grace Poe
- Bong Revilla
- Senate President Tito Sotto
- Francis Tolentino
- Joel Villanueva
- Cynthia Villar
- Majority Leader Migz Zubiri

Two senators dissented:

- Risa Hontiveros
- Kiko Pangilinan

=== House Bill No. 6875 ===
The bill was introduced by the following representatives and filed on May 30, 2020. Out of the 71 original authors, 15 members had their names stricken out as the authors of the controversial bill. The bill was approved on final reading on June 3, 2020, as an adoption of the earlier version approved by Senate. An additional 5 withdrew their authorship afterwards.

- Raneo E. Abu – Batangas, 2nd District
- Cyrille "Beng" F. Abueg-Zaldivar – Palawan, 2nd District
- Maria Fe R. Abunda – Eastern Samar, Lone District, withdrew authorship on June 2, 2020
- Resurreccion M. Acop – Antipolo, 2nd District
- Michael Edgar Y. Aglipay – Party List – DIWA
- Marlyn "Len" B. Alonte – Biñan, Lone District, withdrew authorship on June 2, 2020
- Cristal S. Bagatsing – Manila, 5th District, withdrew authorship on June 2, 2020
- Robert Ace S. Barbers – Surigao del Norte, 2nd District
- Julienne "Jam" A. Baronda – Iloilo City, Lone District, withdrew authorship on June 3, 2020
- Joseph Sto. Niño B. Bernos – Abra, Lone District
- Rozzano Rufino B. Biazon – Muntinlupa, Lone District, Principal author, later disowned bill as it "only copied Senate version". Withdrew authorship June 3, 2020
- Lianda B. Bolilia – Batangas, 4th District, withdrew authorship on June 3, 2020
- Juan Pablo "Rimpy" P. Bondoc – Pampanga, 4th District
- Narciso "Bong" Recio Bravo Jr. – Masbate, 1st District
- Jorge "PATROL" Bustos – Party List – PATROL
- Argel Joseph T. Cabatbat – Party List – MAGSASAKA, withdrew authorship on June 2, 2020
- Manuel DG. Cabochan III – Party List – MAGDALO, withdrew authorship on June 2, 2020
- Arnold "Noli" D. Celeste – Pangasinan, 1st District
- Ma. Theresa V. Collantes – Batangas, 3rd District
- Anthony Peter "Onyx" D. Crisologo – Quezon City, 1st District, withdrew authorship on June 3, 2020
- Manuel Jose "Mannix" M. Dalipe – Zamboanga City, 2nd District
- Francisco G. Datol Jr. – Party List – SENIOR CITIZENS
- Presley C. De Jesus – Party List – PHILRECA
- Adriano A. Ebcas – Party List – AKO PADAYON PILIPINO
- Evelina G. Escudero – Sorsogon, 1st District, withdrew authorship on June 3, 2020
- Conrad M. Estrella III – Party List – ABONO
- Ria Cristina G. Fariñas – Ilocos Norte, 1st District, withdrew authorship on June 2, 2020
- Danilo "Dan" S. Fernandez – Laguna, 1st District
- Lawrence "Law" H. Fortun – Agusan del Norte, 1st District, withdrew authorship on June 2, 2020
- Pablo John F. Garcia – Cebu, 3rd District
- Ciriaco B. Gato Jr. – Batanes, Lone District
- Ruwel Peter S. Gonzaga – Davao de Oro, 2nd District
- Aurelio "Dong" D. Gonzales Jr. – Pampanga, 3rd District, withdrew authorship on June 3, 2020
- Neptali M. Gonzales II – Mandaluyong, Lone District
- Michael B. Gorriceta – Iloilo, 2nd District, withdrew authorship on June 3, 2020
- Ferdinand L. Hernandez – South Cotabato, 2nd District, withdrew authorship on June 4, 2020
- Bernadette "BH" Herrera-Dy – Party List – BH, withdrew authorship on June 4, 2020
- Wilton "Tonton" Tan Kho – Masbate, 3rd District
- Loren Legarda – Antique, Lone District, requested name be removed after being "mistakenly" referred to as coauthor
- Dahlia A. Loyola – Cavite, 5th District
- Rodante D. Marcoleta – Party List – SAGIP
- Ruth Mariano-Hernandez – Laguna, 2nd District, withdrew authorship on June 2, 2020
- Francisco Jose "Bingo" F. Matugas II – Surigao del Norte, 1st District
- John Marvin "Yul Servo" C. Nieto – Manila, 3rd District, withdrew authorship on June 8, 2020
- Jericho Jonas "Koko" Bendigo Nograles – Party List – PBA
- Henry S. Oaminal – Misamis Occidental, 2nd District
- Joseph Stephen "Caraps" S. Paduano – Party List – ABANG LINGKOD
- Wilter "Sharky" Wee Palma II – Zamboanga Sibugay, 1st District
- Alberto "Bobby" Dapidran Pacquiao – Party List – OFW FAMILY
- Eddiebong G. Plaza – Agusan del Sur, 2nd District
- Roberto "Robbie" Villanueva Puno – Antipolo, 1st District
- Strike Bautista Revilla – Cavite, 2nd District
- Michael Odylon L. Romero – Party List – 1-PACMAN
- Ferdinand Martin Gomez Romualdez – Leyte, 1st District
- Xavier Jesus D. Romualdo – Camiguin, Lone District
- Rogelio Neil P. Roque – Bukidnon, 4th District
- Hector S. Sanchez – Catanduanes, Lone District
- Vilma Santos-Recto – Batangas, 6th District
- Edgar Mary S. Sarmiento – Samar, 1st District
- Deogracias Victor "DV" Savellano – Ilocos Sur, 1st District
- Rowena "Niña" O. Taduran – Party List – Party List ACT-CIS
- Samier A. Tan – Sulu, 1st District
- Sharee Ann T. Tan – Samar, 2nd District, withdrew authorship on June 3, 2020
- Jose "Ping-Ping" I. Tejada – North Cotabato, 3rd District, withdrew authorship on June 7, 2020
- John Reynald Marcelo Tiangco – Navotas, Lone District
- Jocelyn P. Tulfo – Party List – Party List ACT-CIS
- Raul "Boboy" C. Tupas – Iloilo, 5th District
- Vicente "Ching" S.E. Veloso – Leyte, 3rd District
- Luis Raymund "LRay" Favis Villafuerte Jr. – Camarines Sur, 2nd District
- Camille A. Villar – Las Piñas, Lone District
- Eric Go Yap – Party List – Party List ACT-CIS

The House of Representatives voted 173–31 in favor of the bill, with 29 abstentions, but was corrected to 168–36 a day after to reflect corrections and retractions from members. The members voted in the plenary and via Zoom and recorded in their "All Members" Viber community

=== Republic Act No. 11479: Signing of the law ===
The law was signed by President Rodrigo Duterte on July 3, 2020, in the midst of the ongoing COVID-19 pandemic and comes as part of the Philippines continued fight against terrorism in its borders. Proponents of the law have cited the siege of Marawi in 2017 as well as criminal activities from the Islamic State-linked Abu Sayyaf group, New People's Army Communist Rebels, and other supposed emerging threats to peace and public safety. According to Justice Secretary Menardo Guevarra, the law took effect on July 18, 2020, 15 days after it was published in the website of the Official Gazette. The Department of Justice released the law's implementing rules and regulations on October 16, 2020.

=== Proposal for repeal ===
In 2022, Kabataan party-list Rep. Raoul Manuel, ACT Teachers party-list Rep. France Castro, and Gabriela women's party-list Rep. Arlene Brosas filed a bill in Congress that sought to repeal the Anti-Terrorism Act of 2020, which supposedly violates the Philippines' international commitment to uphold human rights.

In 2025, Kabataan party-list Rep. Renee Co and ACT Teachers party-list Rep. Antonio Tinio filed House Bill No. 1272 seeking to repeal the Anti-Terrorism Act, which the Makabayan bloc says has been weaponized against critics of the government. The National Union of Peoples' Lawyers called for a repeal of the law, stating that the law has failed to go after terrorists and instead "has become more of a main tool in political repression".

== Legal challenges in the Supreme Court ==
Atty. Howard Calleja et, al. vs. Executive Secretary et, al.
- Court: Supreme Court of the Philippines en banc

Full case name
- Atty. Howard M. Calleja, et al. Vs. Executive Secretary, et al./Rep. Edcel C. Lagman Vs. Executive Secretary Salvador C. Medialdea, et al./Melencio S. Sta. Maria, et al. Vs. Executive Secretary Salvador C. Medialdea, et al./Baya Muna Party-List Representative Carlos Isagani T. Zarate, et al. Vs. President Rodrigo Duterte, et al./Rudolf Philip B. Jurado Vs. The Anti-Terrorism Council, et al./Center for Trade Union and Human Rights (CTUHR), et al. Vs. Hon. Rodrigo R. Duterte, et al./Christian S. Monsod, et al. Vs. Executive Secretary Salvador C. Medialdea, et al./Sanlakas, Represented by Marie Marguerite M. Lopez Vs. Rodrigo R. Duterte, et al./Federation of Free Workers (FFW-NAGKAISA) here represented by its National President Atty. Jose Sonny Matula, et al Vs. Office of the President of the Republic of the Philippines, et al./Jose J. Ferrer, Jr. Vs. Executive Secretary Salvador C. Medialdea, et al./Bagong Alyansang Makabayan (BAYAN) Secretary General Renato Reyes, Jr., et al. Vs. H.E. Rodrigo R. Duterte, et al./Antonio T. Carpio, et al. Vs. Anti-Terrorism Council, et al./Ma. Ceres P. Doyo, et al. Vs. Salvador Medialdea, et al./National Union of Journalist of the Philippines, et al. Vs. Anti-Terrorism Council, et al./Kabataang Tagapagtanggol ng Karapatan Represented by Its National Convener Bryan Ezra C. Gonzales, et a. Vs. Executive Secretary Salvador C. Medialdea, et al./Algamar A. Latiph, et al. Vs. Senate, represented by its President, Vicente C. Sotto, et al./The Alternative Law Groups, Inc. (ALG) Vs. Executive Secretary Salvador C. Medialdea, et al./Bishop Broderick S. Pabillo, et al. Vs. President Rodrigo R. Duterte, et al./General Assembly of Women for Reforms, Integrity, Equality, Leadership and Action (GABRIELA) Inc., et al. Vs. President Rodrigo Roa Duterte, et al./Lawrence A. Yerbo Vs. Offices of the Honorable Senate President and Honorable Speaker of the House of Representatives of the Philippines/Hendy Abendan of Center for Youth Participation and Development Initiatives, et al. Vs. Hon. Salvador C. Medialdea, et al./Concerned Online Citizens represented and Joined by Mark L. Averilla, et al. Vs. Executive Secretary Salvador C. Medialdea, et al./Concerned Lawyers for Civil Liberties (CLCL) Members Rene A.V. Saguisag, et al. Vs. President Rodrigo Roa Duterte, et al./Beverly Longid, et al. Vs. Anti-Terrorism Council, et al./Center for International Law (CENTERLAW), Inc., et al. Vs. Senate of the Philippines, et al./Main T. Mohammad, et al. Vs. Executive Secretary Salvador C. Medialdea, et al./Brgy. Maglaking, San Carlos City, Pangasinan, et al. Vs. Rodrigo R. Duterte, et al./Association of Major Religious Superiors in the Philippines, et al. Vs. Executive Secretary Salvador C. Medialdea, et al./University of the Philippines (UP)-System Faculty Regent Dr. Ramon Guillermo, et al. Vs. H.E, Rodrigo R. Duterte, et al./Philippine Bar Association Vs. The Executive Secretary, et al./Balay Rehabilitation Center, Inc. (BALAY), et al. Vs. Rodrigo R. Duterte, et al./Itegrated Bar of the Philippines, et al. Vs. Senate of the Philippines, et al./Coordinating Council for People's Development and Governance, Inc. (CPDG), et al. Rodrigo R. Duterte, et al./Philippine Misereor Partnership, Inc., et al. Vs. Executive Secretary Salvador C. Medialdea, et al./Pagkakaisa ng Kababaihan Para sa Kalayaan (KAISA KA), et al. Vs. Anti-Terrorism Council, et al./Anak Mindanao (AMIN) Party-List representative Amihilda Sangcopan, et al. Vs. The Executive Secretary, Hon. Salvador Medialdea, et al./Haroun Alashid Alonto Lucman, Jr., et al. Vs. Salvador C. Medialdea, et al.
- Decided: December 7, 2021
- Citation: G. R. No. 252578 et, al.

Questions presented
- Constitutionality of Republic Act No. 11479 or the Anti-Terror Act of 2020

Ruling
- Ponente: Justice Rosmari Carandang
- Supreme Court declared the assailed legislation partly constitutional.

Court membership
- Judges sitting: Alexander Gesmundo, Estela Perlas Bernabe, Marvic Leonen, Alfredo Benjamin Caguioa, Ramon Paul Hernando, Rosmari Carandang, Amy Lazaro-Javier, Henri Jean Paul Inting, Rodil Zalameda, Mario Lopez, Samuel Gaerlan, Ricardo Rosario, Jhosep Lopez, Japar Dimaampao, Midas Marquez
- Concur/dissent: Justices Gesmundo, Perlas-Bernabe, Leonen, Caguioa, Lopez, Gaerlan, Lopez.

The law is currently being challenged in the Supreme Court by multiple groups. Oral arguments began on February 2, 2021, after it was initially delayed due to the COVID-19 pandemic.

37 petitions were filed before the Supreme Court.

Citation	Petition
G.R. No. 252578	Howard Calleja, et al. (includes the De La Salle Brothers led by former Education Secretary Br. Armin Luistro and other civic groups) vs. Executive Secretary, et al.
G.R. No. 252579	Representative Edcel Lagman (Albay's 1st district) vs. Salvador Medialdea, et al.
G.R. No. 252580	Melencio Sta. Maria, et al. (Far Eastern University Institute of Law professors) vs. Salvador Medialdea, et al.
G.R. No. 252585	Carlos Isagani Zarate, et al. (Makabayan Bloc) vs. Rodrigo Duterte, et al.
G.R. No. 252613	Former Office of the Government Corporate Counsel (OGCC) chief Rudolf Jurado vs. Anti-Terrorism Council, et al.
G.R. No. 252623	Center for Trade Union and Human Rights, et al. vs. Rodrigo Duterte, et al.
G.R. No. 252624	Christian Monsod, et al. (with Felicitas Arroyo, Framers of the Constitution with Ateneo and Xavier law professors, the Ateneo Human Rights Center, Jesuit priest Albert Alejo and the labor federation Sentro ng mga Nagkakaisa at Progresibong Manggagawa (SENTRO)) vs. Salvador Medialdea, et al.
G.R. No. 252646	SANLAKAS party-list vs. Rodrigo Duterte, et al.
G.R. No. 252702	Federation of Free Workers (FFW), et al. (labor groups Nagkaisa Labor Coalition (Nagkaisa) and Kilusang Mayo Uno (KMU)) vs. Office of the President, et al.
G.R. No. 252726	José Ferrer Jr. vs. Salvador Medialdea, et al.
G.R. No. 252733	Bagong Alyansang Makabayan (Bayan), et al. (includes 44 leaders and the National Union of Peoples Lawyers (NUPL), Movement Against Tyranny, and Karapatan) vs. Rodrigo Duterte, et al.
G.R. No. 252736	Retired Supreme Court Associate Justice Antonio Carpio, et al. (Retired Supreme Court Associate Justice and former Ombudsman Conchita Carpio-Morales with University of the Philippines law professors) vs. Anti-Terrorism Council, et al.
G.R. No. 252741	Columnist Ma. Ceres Doyo, et al. (Senators Kiko Pangilinan and Leila de Lima, former senators Serge Osmeña and Bobby Tañada, Quezon City representative Kit Belmonte, former Quezon representative Erin Tañada, framers of the constitution Florangel Braid and Ed Garcia, journalists Maria Ressa, Chay Hofileña, Jo-Ann Maglipon, John Nery, former human rights commissioner Etta Rosales, human rights lawyer Chel Diokno—represented by the Free Legal Assistance Group (FLAG)) vs. Salvador Medialdea, et al.
G.R. No. 252747	National Union of Journalists of the Philippines, et al. (artists and cultural workers) vs. Anti-Terrorism Council, et al.
G.R. No. 252755	Kabataang Tagapagtanggol ng Karapatan, et al. (16 youth groups including student organizations from De La Salle University, Ateneo de Manila University, University of the Philippines Diliman, and University of Santo Tomas, represented by young lawyer Dino de Leon) vs. Executive Secretary
G.R. No. 252759	Algamar Latiph, et al. (Bangsamoro residents) vs. Senate, et al.
G.R. No. 252765	Alternative Law Groups, Inc. (ALG) (a coalition of 18 legal resource non-governmental organizations) vs. Medialdea
G.R. No. 252767	Manila Bishop Broderick Pabillo, San Carlos, Negros Occidental Bishop Gerardo Alminaza, United Church of Christ in the Philippines Bishop Emergencio Padillo and 17 others vs. Duterte, et al.
G.R. No. 252768	Gabriela vs. Duterte, et al.
UDK 1663	Lawrence Yerbo vs. Offices of the Honorable Senate President and Speaker
G.R. No. 252802	Henry Abendan and other University of the Philippines Cebu students vs. Medialdea
G.R. No. 252809	Concerned Online Citizens led by Mark Averilla (popularly known as Macoy Dubs) vs. Medialdea
G.R. No. 252903	Concerned Lawyers For Civil Liberties members including former Vice-president Jejomar Binay and former Senator Rene Saguisag vs. Duterte, et al.
G.R. No. 252904	Int'l Indigenous Peoples Movement for Self-Determination & Liberation global coordinator Beverly Longid, former ARMM Regional Legislative Assembly member Samira Gutoc, et al. vs. Anti-Terrorism Council
G.R. No. 252905	Center for International Law, Inc., Vera Files, Lyceum of the Philippines University College of Law faculty, et al. vs. Senate
G.R. No. 252916	Suspected Abu Sayyaf Group members Main Mohammad, Jimmy Bla and Nazr Dilangalen, and Philippine Alliance of Human Advocates vs. Executive Secretary
G.R. No. 252921	Several Sangguniang Kabataan officials led by Lemuel Gio Fernandez Cayabyab of Barangay Magtaking, San Carlos, Pangasinan vs. Duterte
G.R. No. 252984	Association of Major Religious Superiors in the Philippines, et al. vs. Medialdea, et al.
G.R. No. 253018	University of the Philippines Faculty Regent Dr. Ramon Guillermo, et al. vs. Rodrigo Duterte et, al.
G.R. No. 253100	Philippine Bar Association Inc. vs. The Executive Secretary, et, al.
G.R. No. 253118	Balay Rehabilitation Center Inc. et, al. vs. Rodrigo Duterte, et, al.
G.R. No. 253124	Integrated Bar of the Philippines et, al. vs, Senate of the Philippines et, al.
G.R. No. 253242	Coordination Council for People's Development and Governance Inc. (CPDG) et, al. vs. Rodrigo Duterte, et al.
G.R. No. 253252	Philippine Misereor Partnership Inc. et, al. vs, Rodrigo Duterte et, al.
G.R. No. 253254	Pagkakaisa ng Kababaihan Para sa Kalayaan (KAISA KA) et, al. vs. Anti Terrorism Council et, al.
UDK 16714	Anak Mindanao Partylist (AMIN) et, al. vs, Medialdea et, al.
G.R. No. 253420	Haroun Alrashid Alonto Lucman, et, al. vs, Medialdea, et, al.

On December 9, 2021, the Supreme Court announced that except for the qualifier to the proviso in Section 4 of R.A. No. 11479, i.e., "… which are not intended to cause death or serious physical harm to a person, to endanger a person's life, or to create a serious risk to public safety" and the second method for designation in Section 25 paragraph 2 of the same law, i.e., "Request for designation by other jurisdictions or supranational jurisdictions," the rest of the challenged provisions of the law are declared not unconstitutional. It further advised the parties and the public to await the publication of the decision and the separate opinions for the explanation of the votes.

== Challenges to allegations of violating the anti-terror law ==
In 2021, the Olongapo Regional Trial Court acquitted Japer Gurung and Junior Ramos, Indigenous Aeta residents of Zamboanga, in the first known anti-terror law case, ruling that the accusations were the result of mistaken identities.

In November 2023, the prosecutor's office in Santa Rosa City in Laguna rejected a complaint against human rights worker Hailey Pecayo and other activists over the alleged violation of the anti-terror law. In the same month, a prosecutor in Antipolo, Rizal, dismissed anti-terror law charges against human rights activists Kenneth Rementilla and Jasmine Rubia.

In November 2023, Windel Bolinget and three other Indigenous rights workers of the Cordillera People's Alliance filed a case before the Baguio Regional Trial Court challenging their designation as terrorists by the Anti-Terrorism Council.

== Responses and reactions ==
=== International ===
==== United States ====
On July 15, 2020, 50 members of the United States Congress urged Ambassador Jose Manuel Romualdez to request the Government of the Philippines to consider repealing the "oppressive and unnecessary legislation". The 50 representatives are:

- Raul Grijalva (D) representing Arizona's 3rd congressional district
- Mike Thompson (D) representing California's 5th congressional district
- Barbara Lee (D) representing California's 13th congressional district
- Jackie Speier (D) representing California's 14th congressional district
- Eric Swalwell (D) representing California's 15th congressional district
- Ro Khanna (D) representing California's 17th congressional district
- Anna Eshoo (D) representing California's 18th congressional district
- Judy Chu (D) representing California's 27th congressional district
- Adam Schiff (D) representing California's 28th congressional district
- Tony Cardenas (D) representing California's 29th congressional district
- Jimmy Gomez (D) representing California's 34th congressional district
- Gil Cisneros (D) representing California's 39th congressional district
- Katie Porter (D) representing California's 45th congressional district
- Alan Lowenthal (D) representing California's 47th congressional district
- Juan Vargas (D) representing California's 51st congressional district
- Susan Davis (D) representing California's 53rd congressional district
- Rosa DeLauro (D) representing Connecticut's 3rd congressional district
- Ted Deutch (D) representing Florida's 22nd congressional district
- Hank Johnson (D) representing Georgia's 4th congressional district
- Bobby Rush (D) representing Illinois's 1st congressional district
- Jesus "Chuy" Garcia (D) representing Illinois's 4th congressional district
- Danny K. Davis (D) representing Illinois's 7th congressional district
- Jan Schakowsky (D) representing Illinois's 9th congressional district
- Jamie Raskin (D) representing Maryland's 8th congressional district
- Jim McGovern (D) representing Massachusetts' 2nd congressional district
- Stephen F. Lynch (D) representing Massachusetts' 8th congressional district
- Andy Levin (D) representing Michigan's 9th congressional district
- Dean Phillips (D) representing Minnesota's 3rd congressional district
- Betty McCollum (D) representing Minnesota's 4th congressional district
- Ilhan Omar (D) representing Minnesota's 5th congressional district
- Chris Smith (R) representing New Jersey's 4th congressional district
- Deb Haaland (D) representing New Mexico's 1st congressional district
- Nydia Velázquez (D) representing New York's 7th congressional district
- Carolyn Maloney (D) representing New York's 12th congressional district
- Adriano Espaillat (D) representing New York's 13th congressional district
- Alexandria Ocasio-Cortez (D) representing New York's 14th congressional district
- Jose E. Serrano (D) representing New York's 15th congressional district
- Eliot Engel (D) representing New York's 16th congressional district
- Paul Tonko (D)representing New York's 20th congressional district
- Marcy Kaptur (D) representing Ohio's 9th congressional district
- Suzanne Bonamici (D) representing Oregon's 1st congressional district
- Earl Blumenauer (D) representing Oregon's 3rd congressional district
- Brian Fitzpatrick (R) representing Pennsylvania's 1st congressional district
- Eddie Bernice Johnson (D) representing Texas's 30th congressional district
- Colin Allred (D) representing Texas's 32nd congressional district
- Peter Welch (D) representing Vermont's at-large congressional district
- Bobby Scott (politician) (D) representing Virginia's 3rd congressional district
- Pramila Jayapal (D) representing Washington's 7th congressional district
- Mark Pocan (D) representing Wisconsin's 2nd congressional district
- Eleanor Holmes Norton (D) representing District of Columbia

==== United Nations ====
On June 30, 2020, at the 44th regular session of the UN Human Rights Council in Geneva, Switzerland. The UN High Commissioner for Human Rights Michelle Bachelet has criticized the then proposed bill saying it could have a "chilling effect" on human rights work in the country and called for restraint on signing the bill from President Duterte.

In November 2023, the United Nations Special Rapporteur on the promotion and protection of human rights in the context of climate change Ian Fry urged the government to repeal the Anti-Terrorism Act and abolish the National Task Force to End Local Communist Armed Conflict. Fry also suggested that the government set up a "truth and reconciliation process to deal with the harm that has been caused by the military to members of the community."

In February 2024, United Nations Special Rapporteur for freedom of opinion and expression Irene Khan called on the government to repeal the controversial Anti-Terrorism Law of 2020 and the Cybercrime Prevention Act of 2012, saying that these laws go against Constitutional guarantees to freedom of expression in the Philippines. Khan stated that the Anti-Terror Law goes against international standards on warrantless arrests, warrantless searches, and detention without a warrant.

==== Amnesty International ====
Nicholas Bequelin, Amnesty International's Asia-Pacific Regional Director, has said upon hearing news of the law being signed:

"This law's introduction is the latest example of the country's ever-worsening human rights record. Once again, this shows why the UN should launch a formal investigation into ongoing widespread and systematic violations in the country."

==== Greenpeace ====
The Southeast Asia office of Greenpeace urged the repeal of the Anti-Terrorism Act of 2020 due to its "sweeping definition of terrorism" which it said could be abused to stifle dissent.

==== Others ====
The Washington Post called the bill's enactment as "another nail in the coffin of the Philippines' waning democracy." The Diplomat has stated that the law "takes aim at dissent." While Al Jazeera notes that the law is "poised to cause more terror." Various international artists have expressed dissent against the legislation, including Taylor Swift. Swedish environmental activist Greta Thunberg also joined the petition against anti-terrorism law. German Climate change denier and right-wing activist Naomi Seibt condemn Greta Thunberg's opposition to the anti-terror law for attacking the Philippine Government and give a support to the anti-terrorism act.

=== Local ===
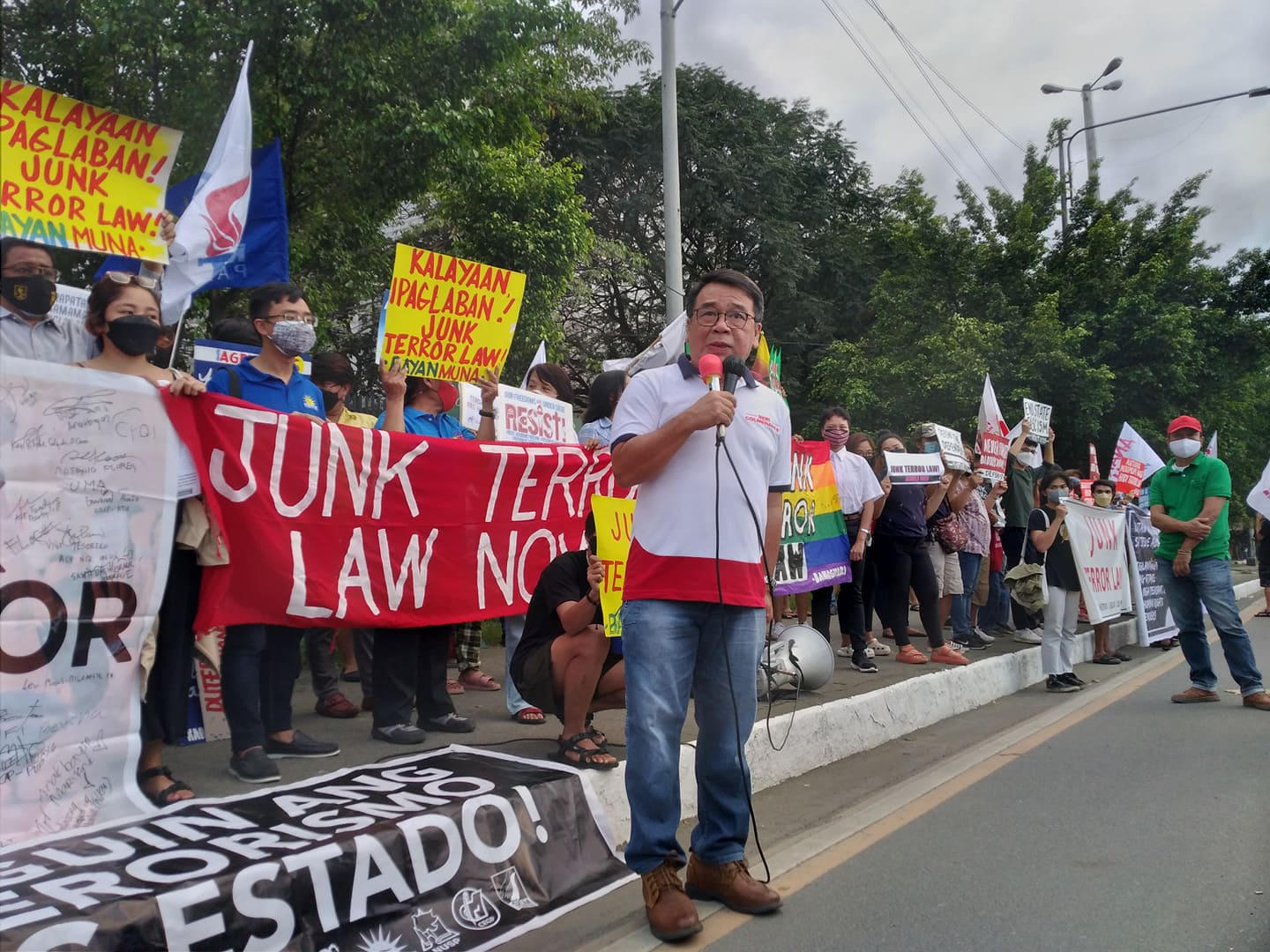
Neri Colmenares, speaking at a mobilization against the Anti-Terrorism Act of 2020, December, 2021

==== Commission on Human Rights ====
The Philippine Commission on Human Rights in June 2020 aired concerns that the passage of the draft law was being railroaded in Congress. It described the draft law as "highly intrusive" and open to abuse by state forces.

==== Bangsamoro Autonomous Region in Muslim Mindanao ====
On July 2, 2020, the Bangsamoro Parliament passed a resolution urging President Rodrigo Duterte to veto the anti-terrorism bill, arguing that it would lead to abuses and would unfairly target Muslim Filipinos who have historically faced religious discrimination. After the passage of the bill into law, Chief Minister Murad Ebrahim released a statement saying that Bangsamoro regional government fully respects President Duterte's decision to sign the bill into law and that it would seek representation in the Anti-Terrorism Council. In response, presidential spokesperson Harry Roque pointed out that the law does not provide for a council seat for the Bangsamoro regional government although the same law mandates the council to coordinate with the autonomous region's government.

==== Philippine Independence Day protests ====
More than 1,000 students and human rights activists gathered inside the UP Diliman campus on June 12, 2020, coinciding on 122nd Independence Day from Spanish colonial rule, dubbed it as "Grand Mañanita". They called for the government to "junk" the proposed bill stating fears that it would curtail basic human rights and freedom of speech and dissent. The rally was held despite a government ban on mass gatherings under the general community quarantine in Metro Manila and other parts of the country because of the pandemic. Protesters could be seen wearing masks and practicing social distancing. Similar demonstrations were held by activists in various cities such as Baguio, Legazpi, and Cebu City. Demonstrations were also held at other universities such as the De La Salle University in Manila. Activist Mae Paner also present at the event, dressed up like Metro Manila Police Chief Debold Sinas who was faced controversy over his birthday celebration on May 8, 2020, which the police called it "Mananita".

==== Churches and religious organizations ====
The National Council of Churches in the Philippines, a fellowship of ten Philippine Protestant denominations, denounced the bill as "a travesty against God's will as it gives the government, or even just a few persons in the Anti-terrorism Council, the absolute power that determines what course people's lives will take by putting forward a very vague definition of terrorism." The Philippine Council of Evangelical Churches had likewise expressed reservations about the bill, saying "We firmly believe this Act imperils the rights of Filipinos and sense of dignity which, having its origin in God, our laws are called to uphold and protect." The PCEC specifically cited "vague definitions of terrorism, and the extended period of warrantless detention, which opens the way to serious abuses of a person's rights and dignity" as reasons for concern.

==== Others ====
The AMIHAN–National Federation of Peasant Women have said that the rising cases of red-tagging in the country confirm the prevalent criticisms against the controversial legislation. The Association of Major Religious Superiors in the Philippines (AMRSP), which brings together the heads of men and women religious orders in the country, have expressed their dissent against the law, which they say may "assault human dignity and human rights." Various Filipino artists have also expressed disappointment and dissent against the signing of the bill. Members of the Filipino art community have also expressed their dissent. But Dr. Rommel C. Banlaoi, chair of the Philippine Institute for Peace, Violence and Terrorism defends the need to have a new Philippine anti-terrorism law as threats of terrorism in the Philippines have escalated even during the COVID-19 pandemic. Nonetheless, Dr. Banlaoi encourages those opposed to the anti-terrorism law to continue what they are doing in order to remain vigilant and to ensure human rights protection during the implementation of the said law.

Celebrities, including former Miss Universe titlists Gloria Diaz, Pia Wurtzbach, and Catriona Gray, voiced their opposition to the bill.

==== Youth ====
The UP Diliman also took a knee in solidarity with Black Lives Matter and the fight against police brutality after George Floyd was murdered by the police officer while being arrested for allegedly using a counterfeit bill in Minneapolis, Minnesota.

Seven protesters from University of the Philippines, who were condemning the controversial anti-terror bill, and one bystander were arrested in Cebu City in June 2020 for alleged violations of general community quarantine guidelines. Dubbed as "Cebu 8", the detainees were jailed for 3 days. PNP Central Visayas denied the allegations that they used excessive force to disperse the anti-terror bill protests.

Following the protests against the controversial anti-terrorism bill, several cloned Facebook accounts have been created on the platform. It started with University of the Philippines Cebu on June 6, 2020, which was targeted by the newly created, dummy Facebook accounts. The Facebook accounts later targeted residents in Metro Manila, Iloilo, Dumaguete, Cagayan de Oro City, and other areas where protests against the bill were held. As a result, the hashtag #HandsOffOurStudents trended on Twitter, where netizens condemned the creation of fake accounts. Department of Justice Secretary Menardo Guevarra expressed concern over the matter and ordered the agency's cybercrime division to coordinate with the NBI and the PNP to investigate the matter.

== FATF gray list ==
The Financial Action Task Force (FATF) placed the Philippines on its "gray list" in 2021 for the country's supposedly weak performance in addressing terrorism and money laundering. The Philippines increased its filings of terror financing charges to remove itself from the list. The Philippines was removed from the gray list in February 2025. The National Union of People's Lawyers said that the Department of Justice has weaponized terror laws by targeting activists to meet FATF quotas.

As of February 2025, more than 59 development workers are facing harassment and terrorism charges, according to the Defend NGO Network. More than 166 activists face cases of alleged violations of the Terrorism Financing Prevention and Suppression Act of 2012 and the Anti-Terrorism Act, according to human rights organization Karapatan.

== See also ==
- List of Philippine laws
- Human Security Act of 2007
- Red-tagging in the Philippines
