= Case competition =

In a case competition, participants strive to develop the best solution to a business or education-related case study within an allocated time frame, typically with teams of two or more individuals pitted against each other in a head-to-head or broader relative ranking. Teams deliver presentations for judges and, while competitions vary in composition, a standard format and purpose exists. In terms of cumulative number of participants, the HSBC/HKU Asia Pacific Business Case Competition is the world's largest case competition, with over 130,000 participants since 2008.

== History ==
The case competition concept originated in the United States and originally included participants from domestic universities. The notion of expanding to include international competitors emerged later, with the concept eventually taking hold across North America and Western Europe. Today, a wide range of international competitions are hosted in various countries in North America, Europe, Oceania, and Asia. International case competitions have also begun expanding beyond the undergraduate level, as competitions like the Wharton China Business Society International Case Competition offer high school divisions.

== Format ==
Formats vary according to a number of dimensions. The following dimensions are often used to classify and compare competitions: Host: corporate versus educational institution; Participant selection: "by invitation" versus "by application"; and, Level: undergraduate, graduate. Formats may vary along practical dimensions, including: Case specificity (whether the case has been written especially for the competition or not); Number of teams; Organization (student-run, professional etc.); Rules, e.g.:Time (common formats are 3-4 or 24 hours), Materials, Degree of access to expert advice (either from within the competition or externally, and electronically or face to face).

Some competitions add complexity to create a more interesting challenge. For example, Ohio State University (OSU)'s Center for International Business Education And Research (CIBER), in its annual Case Challenge, created teams from the overall pool of participants, regardless of school, dissolving the usual school-based team format. For the Ohio State scenario, once the students are assigned to teams, a full day of team-building exercises is run for competitors.

Competitions can be internal to a business school, or they can involve teams from multiple schools. Sometimes the competition includes several rounds, with the final round typically judged by outside company executives (sometimes the panel consists of executives from the actual company in the case). For example, the University of Washington’s Foster School of Business' 2010 round of its Global Business Case Competition featured a customized case on the Boeing Company, and Boeing executives acted as judges.

== Participation ==
Participants exercise skills and knowledge on a "real world" case for an actual organization, with the support of representatives who can provide professional advice. Other competitions select an issue based on its degree of importance, and employ the competition as a means to both highlight the issue and create potential solutions through the efforts of the competitors. Participants can also be assessed as potential candidates for analysis-based jobs within the targeted companies.

Teams in case competitions are tasked with assessing the situation facing the organization, analyzing available information, crafting a solution, and defending their recommendations. In general, teams adhere to a time limit and specific rules. Each team is judged independently, and the judges' decision is final, although a confidential summary evaluation is generally provided.

Depending on the competition, participants may be able to sign up on their own through an online portal, or through their school's engagement office. Competitions are often advertised through word-of-mouth advertising and local portals. Platforms such as CaseComp also exist to provide a central database of in-person and virtual competitions worldwide. Some competitions are hosted partially or entirely online.

== Notable competitions ==
=== Invitational competitions ===
| Competition | Country | University | Level | Teams | Inaugural Year |
|---|---|---|---|---|---|
| Alberta International Case Competition (AIBC) | Canada | Alberta School of Business, University of Alberta | Undergraduate | 12 teams | 2016 |
| Asian Business Case Competition @ Nanyang (ABCC) | Singapore | Nanyang Technological University | Undergraduate | 12 teams | 2007 |
| Australian Undergraduate Business Case Competition (AUBCC) | Australia | QUT, UNSW, University of Melbourne | Undergraduate | 16 teams | 2013 |
| Belgrade Business International Case Competition - BBICC | Serbia | University of Belgrade | Undergraduate | 20 teams | 2013 |
| BI International Case Competition - BIICC | Norway | BI Norwegian Business School | Undergraduate | 12 teams | 2016 |
| CBS Case Competition | Denmark | Copenhagen Business School | Undergraduate | 12 teams | 2002 |
| CaseIT MIS Case Competition | Canada | Beedie School of Business | Undergraduate | 20 teams | 2004 |
| Central European Case Competition (CECC) | Hungary | Case Solvers & Corvinus University of Budapest | Undergraduate | 20 teams | 2019 |
| Champions Trophy Case Competition | New Zealand | University of Auckland | Undergraduate | 12 teams | 2008 |
| Chulalongkorn International Business Case Competition (CIBCC) | Thailand | Chulalongkorn University | Undergraduate | 20 teams | 2014 |
| Citi International Case Competition | Hong Kong | HKUST | Undergraduate | 20 teams | 2003 |
| Engineering and Commerce Case Competition(ENGCOMM) | Canada | Concordia University | Undergraduate | 12 teams | 2013 |
| Global Business Case Competition (GBCC) | Japan | Ritsumeikan Asia Pacific University | Undergraduate | 16 teams | 2015 |
| Global Microfinance Case Competition (GMCC) | Australia | University of Melbourne (Melbourne Microfinance Initiative) | Undergraduate & Graduate | 16 universities | 2011 |
| Global Business Case Competition | United States | University of Washington | Undergraduate | 15 teams | 1999 |
| Grossman School of Business Family Enterprise Case Competition (FECC) | United States | The University of Vermont | Undergraduate & Graduate | 24 teams | 2013 |
| HSBC/HKU Asia Pacific Business Case Competition | Hong Kong | The University of Hong Kong | Undergraduate | 24 teams | 2008 |
| International Graduate Competition | Canada | HEC Montreal | Graduate | 08 teams | 2012 |
| International Case Competition @ Maastricht | Netherlands | Maastricht University | Undergraduate | 16 teams | 2009 |
| Japan MBA Case Competition | Japan | Tokyo-based MBA programs | Graduate - MBA | 09 teams | 2013 |
| John Molson Undergraduate Case Competition (JMUCC) | Canada | John Molson School of Business | Undergraduate | 28 teams | 2009 |
| John Molson MBA International Case Competition | Canada | John Molson School of Business | Graduate - MBA | 36 teams | 1981 |
| Lazaridis International Case Conference (LazICC) | Canada | Lazaridis School of Business and Economics | Undergraduate | 16 teams | 2018 |
| Marshall International Case Competition (MICC) | United States | University of Southern California | Undergraduate | 20 teams | 1997 |
| McGill Management International Case Competition | Canada | McGill University | Undergraduate | 12 teams | 2001 |
| McIntire International Case Competition | United States | University of Virginia | Undergraduate | 06 teams | 1982 |
| NUS Case Competition | Singapore | National University of Singapore | Undergraduate | 20 teams | 2009 |
| RMA Credit Risk Case Competition | Canada | Sobey School of Business | Graduate | 08 teams | 2013 |
| Rotterdam/Carleton International Case Competition | Netherlands / Canada | Rotterdam University of Applied Sciences and Carleton University | Undergraduate | 16 teams | 2020 |
| RSM STAR Case Competition | Netherlands | Rotterdam School of Management, Erasmus University | Undergraduate | 16 teams | 2012 |
| Sauder Summit Global Case Competition | Canada | UBC Sauder School of Business | Undergraduate | 16 teams | 2013 |
| Solvers' Cup | Hungary | Case Solvers | Undergraduate | 09 teams | 2016 |
| Sydney International Business Competition | Australia | The University of Sydney Business School | Undergraduate | 12 teams | 2017 |
| Thammasat Undergraduate Business Challenge (TUBC) | Thailand | Thammasat University | Undergraduate | 16 teams | 2007 |
| University of Münster Case Competition (UMCC) | Germany | University of Münster | Undergraduate - MBA | 12 Teams | 2017 |
| University of Navarra International Case Competition (UNICC) | Spain | University of Navarra | Undergraduate | 16 teams | 2013 |
| University of Technology Sydney Global Case Competition (UTSGCC) | Australia | University of Technology Sydney | Undergraduate | 16 teams | 2020 |
| WBS Case Challenge | United Kingdom | Warwick Business School | Graduate | 08 teams | 2013 |
| Capitox Case Competition | United Kingdom | University of Oxford | undergraduate | 08 teams | 2019 |

=== Competitions by application ===
- APEX Business-IT Global Case Challenge, Singapore Management University
- Inter-Collegiate Business Competition, Queen's School of Business
- Aarhus Case Competition, Aarhus University
