= Cayetano Paderanga Jr. =

Filipino politician (1948–2016)

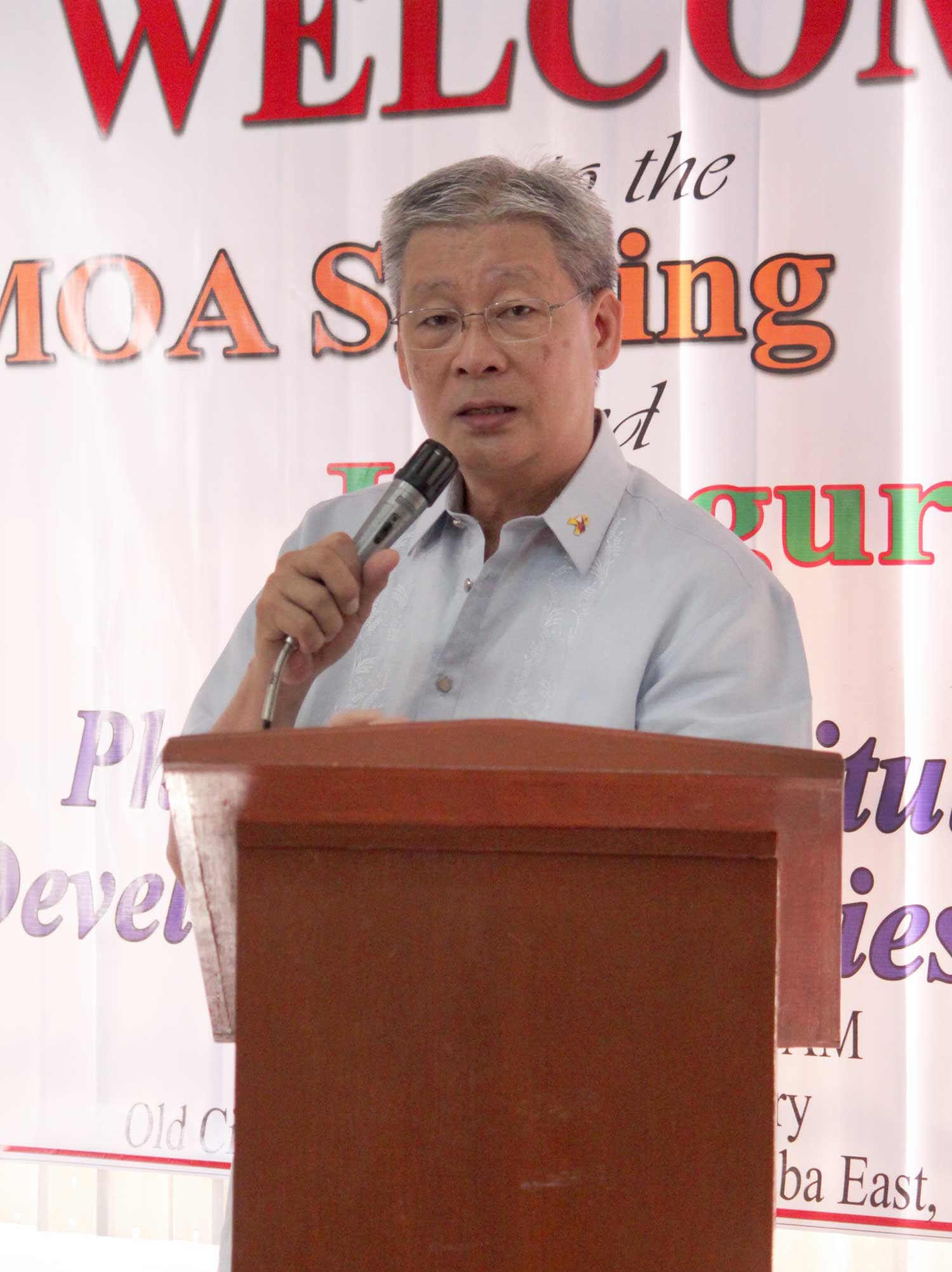
- Cayetano Paderanga Jr. in July 2011

7th Director-General of the National Economic and Development Authority Concurrently Secretary of Socioeconomic Planning
- In office August 3, 2010 – May 10, 2012
- President: Benigno Aquino III
- Preceded by: Ralph Recto; Augusto Santos (acting)
- Succeeded by: Arsenio Balisacan
- In office 1990–1992
- President: Corazon Aquino
- Preceded by: Jesus Estanislao
- Succeeded by: Cielito Habito

Personal details
- Born: October 9, 1948 Camiguin, Philippines
- Died: January 29, 2016 (aged 67) Taguig, Philippines
- Spouse: Delia C. Paderanga
- Children: 2
- Education: Stanford University; University of Asia and the Pacific; De La Salle University
- Occupation: Economist, NEDA Director General, Economics Professor

Cayetano "Dondon" Paderanga Jr. (October 9, 1948 – January 29, 2016) was a Filipino economist and former Director-General of the National Economic and Development Authority (NEDA), a cabinet-level agency of the Philippine government responsible for economic development and planning.

Paderanga previously served as NEDA Director-General from 1990 to 1992, under former President Corazon C. Aquino's presidency and was a member of the Monetary Board of the Central Bank of the Philippines from 1993 to 1999. He was also Executive Director for the Philippines in the Asian Development Bank (ADB) from 2001 to 2003.

A native of Camiguin province in Northern Mindanao, Paderanga was a graduate of the Center for Research and Communication (now the University of Asia & the Pacific) and De La Salle University and holds a Ph.D. in Economics from Stanford University in California, USA. Paderanga was also a professor of economics at the University of the Philippines School of Economics.

== Early life ==
Paderanga was born on October 9, 1948, in Camiguin to Atty. Cayetano Palarca Paderanga & Judge Consejo Woo Paderanga. He is the 4th eldest child among 16 siblings. He attended high school at the Fatima College of Camiguin. He took up Accounting at the De La Salle University in Manila in March 1968.

== Career ==
=== Academic career ===
Upon finishing his bachelor's degree in accountancy as a full Scholar of the Del Monte Packing Corporation from 1964 to 1968, Paderanga worked for the then De La Salle College from June 1969 to May 1971. He had been research tutor from June 1971 to August 1972 at the Center for Research and Communication (now the University of Asia and the Pacific), where he was also pursuing his graduate studies. He was a Fulbright-Hays Fellow in 1972.

Paderanga attended the prestigious Stanford University for his Ph.D. in Economics, served as a university fellow from 1974 to 1976 and as a teaching assistant from September 1976 to August 1977. He also worked as an instructor at the Foothill College in Mountain View, California, from September 1976 to June 1978 and as research assistant for the Center for Econometric Studies on Crime at the Hoover Institute of Stanford University from January 1977 to May 1979. He completed his dissertation "Racial Preferences and Housing Prices: The Case of San Mateo County, California" under Richard Muth in 1979.

Upon receiving his Ph.D. degree, Paderanga joined the faculty of UP School of Economics at the University of the Philippines Diliman as an assistant professor. He received the Rockfeller Foundation Postdoctoral Fellowship in Population Sciences from 1983 to 1984 and served as a Visiting Fellow of the Economic Growth Center in the Department of Economics of Yale University from 1983 to 1984. He subsequently left for Canada as a Visiting Assistant Professor at the University of Western Ontario. Paderanga was promoted to full professor rank in the University of the Philippines Diliman in June 1991 and was appointed Visiting Professor at Kobe University in Japan in 2010.

=== Government service ===
Following President Benigno Aquino III's win in the 2010 national elections, he was appointed as the Socio-Economic planning Secretary. This is the second time that he has held this post, the first one being under President Corazon C. Aquino's administration.

In July 2010, as NEDA Director-General under President Benigno Aquino III's Cabinet, Paderanga Jr. said that he sees an 8% growth in the economy, higher than the original 5-6% forecast by the government.

After almost a year in office, Paderanga Jr. was finally confirmed by the Commission on Appointments (CA) on May 17, 2011.

Close to a year after his confirmation, Paderanga Jr. resigned his post at NEDA. According to Abigail Valte, one of the President's spokespersons, Paderanga Jr. quit for health reasons. Dean Arsenio Balisacan of the University of the Philippines was appointed as acting NEDA Director-General shortly after. Immediately after, President Aquino appointed him Chairman of the Development Academy of the Philippines (DAP) at his request, as he felt that this was a less stressful post where he could nonetheless continue to serve the government. Still, he worked actively in the DAP, involving himself in its numerous programs and projects. He held this position until his death.

Paderanga served as a member of the Monetary Board of the Central Bank of the Philippines (Bangko Sentral ng Pilipinas). He was also the Executive Director and Alternate Executive Director for the Philippines, Pakistan, Maldives, Marshall Islands, Mongolia and Kazakhstan in the Asian Development Bank from 2001 to 2003.

== Death ==
Paderanga died of complications from heart surgery on January 29, 2016, at St. Luke's Medical Center Global City. He was surrounded by his immediate family at the time of his death.

== Affiliations ==
- National Research Council of the Philippines
- Philippine Economics Society, Life Member
- American Economics Association
- American Studies Association of the Philippines (ASAP), 1985
- Philippine Statistical Association Inc. since 2005
- Pacific Economic Outlook Experts Group, since March 1998

== Papers ==
Paderanga Jr. wrote a paper on the global crisis of 2009 entitled "Learning From The Global Crisis - East Asian Model", at a time when he was a visiting professor at the Kobe University in Japan.

Preceded by Augusto Santos (Acting)	Director-General of the National Economic and Development Authority; 2010 – 2012	Succeeded by Arsenio Balisacan
Preceded by Jesus Estanislao	Director-General of the National Economic and Development Authority; 1990 – 1992	Succeeded by Cielito Habito
