= Center for Research and Communication =

Philippine think tank and consultancy firm

- Established: 1967; 59 years ago
- Founders: Bernardo M. Villegas; Jesus Estanislao
- Purpose: Think tank
- Location: Pasig, Metro Manila, Philippines
- Affiliations: University of Asia and the Pacific

The Center for Research and Communication (CRC) is a consultancy firm and think tank in the Philippines best known for being one of the earliest Philippine think-tanks, with expertise in business, economics, international relations, and education, as well as more recently food and agribusiness, energy, data science, analytics, and transportation and logistics,

Associated with the University of Asia and the Pacific, which evolved in the 1990s out of the educational initiatives it had undertaken since its inception, many of its consultants have held government policy-making posts, or been tapped to advise the Philippine government on economic policy while also teaching at the university.

It was very influential in the 1970s, when it was one of the few institutions publishing foundational textbooks on economics through its subsidiary, sinag-tala publishers. The graduate degree programs it established in 1989 were later spun off to become the University of Asia and the Pacific in 1995, with many CRC consultants concurrently handling academic duties as professors.

== History ==
=== Establishment ===
The CRC was established as a think tank in 1967 by economists Bernardo M. Villegas and Jesus Estanislao, who were among the Philippines' young postwar generation academics able to study at Harvard. Their intent was to create an institution which catered the demand for business economy research needed by the Philippines' growing business sector.

After this formal establishment, CRC set up its offices in a rented facility along Jorge Bocobo Street in Malate, Manila. Prior to this, the CRC's first office was at the offices of the United Coconut Authority of the Philippines, a private organization of coconut producers, then headed by Ambassador Jose V. Romero Jr., who served as its executive director.

=== Influence during the 1970s ===
The CRC grew very influential in the 1970s, when it was one of the few institutions publishing foundational textbooks on economics through its subsidiary, sinag-tala publishers.

Through economist Bernardo Villegas, the CRC also played a part in the efforts to recover the unexplained wealth of the Marcos family. In the book "Philippine Political Economy: The Marcos Years," Ambassador Romero recalls that Dr. Villegas was the source US Ambassador to the Philippines Stephen Bosworth had referred to when he testified to the United States Congress House Committee on Foreign Affairs that about US$10 billion worth of capital had left the Philippines since the Philippine economy went into a nosedive in 1983. The Presidential Commission on Good Government later cited a similar amount as an estimate of the unexplained wealth of Ferdinand and Imelda Marcos.

=== Creation and delineation of the University of Asia and the Pacific ===
The expansion of CRC into a university was inspired by a private meeting in Mexico between the founder of Opus Dei, Msgr. Josemaría Escrivá (now Saint), and the founders of CRC in 1970. The meeting encouraged Estanislao and Villegas to expand the institution's horizons internationally, which resulted to its first graduate program, the Masters in Industrial Economics.

CRC then moved to its current campus in Ortigas Center, Pasig, with established formal and informal programs in 1982. A year later, the Center for Food and Agribusiness was established. Then in 1987, CRC was reminded by Bishop Álvaro del Portillo to establish a university. This resulted to the Institute of Development Education, the foundation for the School of Education.

In 1995, the CRC's bid to become a university was approved by the Philippines' Commission on Higher Education, and the new university was named the University of Asia and the Pacific (UA&P).

The CRC did not cease to exist, however; it continued to take on consultancy projects under its old name, as the Center for Research and Communication Foundation, Inc.

== Research areas ==
Aside from its regular business consultancy work, CRC's linkages with UA&P over the years have allowed it to partner with corporations and foundations with interests in the areas of Policy Research, Social Economics, Migration and Overseas Filipino Work, Family and Youth Education to establish institutional research work.

=== Social economics ===
CRC made research on social economics a major part of its agenda beginning in 2013, initially partnering with UA&P and Asiapro Multi-Purpose Cooperative, with the agenda defined as "how economics and business can–without losing their predominant concerns on getting the maximum material benefits from relatively scarce resources." Much of CRC's work in this area has focused on cooperatives, with one major initiative being the gathering of stakeholder inputs for the Implementing Rules and Regulations of the Philippines' Cooperative Development Authority Charter of 2019 (Republic Act 11364).

=== Migration and Overseas Filipino Work ===
In 2014, CRC also established a research chair focused on Migration and Overseas Filipino Work, initially in partnership with the BPI Foundation. Its notable research in the area concerns the support system needs of OFWs, on their reintegratrion experiences upon returning to the Philippines, and an influential 2022 study on OFWs physical and mental health needs which was later awarded the inaugural APEC Healthy Women, Healthy Economies Research Prize by the APEC Forum on Women and the Economy in 2019.

== Prominent consultants ==
- Bernardo Villegas
- Jesus Estanislao
- Placido Mapa Jr.
- Winston Conrad B. Padojinog
- Rolando T. Dy
- Veronica Ramirez
- Peter Lee U
