= Presidential Commission on Good Government =

Independent government agency

- Pampanguluhang Komisyon sa Mabuting Pamahalaan

Agency overview
- Formed: February 28, 1986
- Jurisdiction: Government of the Philippines
- Headquarters: 21st & 22nd Floor, The JMT Condominium Corporation No. 27 ADB Ave. Ortigas Center, Brgy. San Antonio, Pasig City
- Employees: 97 (2024)
- Annual budget: ₱166.47 million (2023)
- Ministers responsible: CA Justice (Ret.) Melchor Quirino C. Sadang, Chairperson; Angelito S. Vergel De Dios, Commissioner; Atty. Marco M. Bautista, Commissioner; Atty. Rogelio V. Quevedo, Commissioner; Justice Elihu Ybañez (Ret.); Atty. Raymond Anthony Dilag, Commissioner
- Parent agency: Department of Justice
- Key document: Executive Order No. 1, s. 1986
- Website: pcgg.gov.ph

The Presidential Commission on Good Government (PCGG; Filipino: Pampanguluhang Komisyon sa Mabuting Pamahalaan) is a quasi-judicial government agency of the Philippines whose primary mandate is to recover the ill-gotten wealth accumulated by Ferdinand Marcos, his immediate family, relatives, subordinates and close associates, whether located in the Philippines or abroad. It was created by President Corazon Aquino shortly after she was sworn in as president in the aftermath of the 1986 People Power revolution. In addition to recovering the Marcos wealth, it is also tasked with investigating other cases of graft and corruption; and instituting of corruption prevention measures.

Soon after the PCGG was created, Aquino issued an executive order freezing the assets of the Marcoses in the Philippines, and assigning the PCGG to negotiate with foreign governments so that the Marcoses' wealth overseas could be repatriated to the Philippines, giving the PCGG diplomatic powers in addition to its quasi-judicial functions.

In keeping with the Comprehensive Agrarian Reform Law in 1988, the funds recovered by the PCGG are automatically appropriated to fund the Philippines' agrarian reform programs, and has since then funded more than 80 percent of the Philippines' budget for agrarian reform.

== Mandates and powers ==
=== Mandates ===
The mandates of the PCGG are spelled out under Section 2 of Executive Order No. 1, series 1986:

(a) Recovery of ill-gotten wealth of the Marcoses – The executive order specifies this as "all ill-gotten wealth accumulated by former President Ferdinand E. Marcos, his immediate family, relatives, subordinates and close associates, whether located in the Philippines or abroad, including the takeover or sequestration of all business enterprises and entities owned or controlled by them, during his administration, directly or through nominees, by taking undue advantage of their public office and/or using their powers, authority, influence, connections or relationship."

(b) Investigation of any other cases of graft and corruption - which may be assigned to the commission by the President

(c) The Institution of corruption prevention measures - The executive order specifies this as "The adoption of safeguards to ensure that the above practices shall not be repeated in any manner under the new government, and the institution of adequate measures to prevent the occurrence of corruption."

=== Powers ===
Sec. 3 of Executive Order No. 1 enumerates the powers and authorities of the PCGG:

(a) To conduct investigation as may be necessary in order to accomplish and carry out the purposes of this order.

(b) To sequester or place or cause to be placed under its control or possession any building or office wherein any ill-gotten wealth or properties may be found, and any records pertaining thereto, in order to prevent their destruction, concealment or disappearance which would frustrate or hamper the investigation or otherwise prevent the commission from accomplishing its task.

(c) To provisionally take over in the public interest or to prevent its disposal or dissipation, business enterprises and properties taken over by the government of the Marcos Administration or by entities or persons close to former President Marcos, until the transactions leading to such acquisition by the latter can be disposed of by the appropriate authorities.

(d) To enjoin or restrain any actual or threatened commission of facts by any person or entity that may render moot and academic, or frustrate, or otherwise make ineffectual the efforts of the commission to carry out its tasks under this order.

(e) To administer oaths, and issue subpoena requiring the attendance and testimony of witnesses and/or the production of such books, papers, contracts, records, statement of accounts and other documents as may be material to the investigation conducted by the commission.

(f) To hold any person in direct or indirect contempt and impose the appropriate penalties, following the same procedures and penalties provided in the Rules of Court.

(g) To seek and secure the assistance of any office, agency or instrumentality of the government.

(h) To promulgate such rules and regulations as may be necessary to carry out the purpose of this order.

== Achievements ==
=== Recovery of ill gotten wealth ===
As of 2019, the PCGG has recovered more than ₱171 billion of ill-gotten wealth from the Marcoses and from Marcos cronies since its creation in 1986. Some of this came from money sequestered by the PCGG or surrendered under various compromise agreements, and some of it came from the sale of various surrendered or sequestered properties.

=== Support to the Comprehensive Agrarian Reform Program ===
When the Philippines' Comprehensive Agrarian Reform Law was passed in 1988, it contained provisions saying that funds recovered by the PCGG should be automatically appropriated to fund the agrarian reform program. Since then, the PCGG has remitted significant amounts to the Department of Agrarian Reform, supplying 80% of the Philippines' agrarian reform budget as of the mid-2010s.

== History ==
=== Background ===
By the time Ferdinand Marcos was inaugurated president in 1965, he had already served three terms as Congressman for the second district of Ilocos Norte to the Philippine House of Representatives, and then served in the Philippine senate from 1959 to 1965, eventually becoming Senate President before winning the 1965 Philippine Presidential Election. He remained President for 21 years despite the eight year (two four year terms) limitation set by the 1935 Constitution of the Philippines by placing the country under Martial Law in 1972.

Marcos' rule after his 1972 declaration of Martial Law was characterized by numerous human rights abuses while the Marcoses became known for an increasingly decadent lifestyle, until the collapse of the Philippine economy in 1983 and the assassination of opposition senator Benigno Aquino Jr. finally led to the Marcoses being deposed by the 1986 People Power revolution and exiled to Hawaii.

Statements of Assets filed by Ferdinand and Imelda Marcos from 1966 to 1986, showed that they had earned combined salaries worth P2,319,583.33 ($304,372.43 based on prevailing exchange rates at that time). But documents discovered in the Malacañang Palace showed that they had accumulated US$5 billion to US$10 billion worth of cash and assets, spread across the globe.

==== Ill-gotten wealth ====
Estimates of the ill-gotten wealth of the Marcos family vary, with most sources accepting a figure of about US$5 billion–10 billion for wealth acquired in the last years of the Marcos administration, but with rough extreme estimates of wealth acquired since the 1950s going as high as US$30 billion.

In a 1985 report to the United States Congress House Committee on Foreign Affairs, Ambassador Stephen Bosworth estimated that the Marcoses had stolen an accumulated wealth of US$10 billion "in recent years", in the context of the rapid decline of the Philippine economy in the early 1980s. The same figure was cited by the Philippines' Office of the Solicitor General soon after Marcos was deposed by the EDSA Revolution in 1986.

Bosworth's source, Dr. Bernardo Villegas of the Philippine think tank the Center for Research and Communication, noted that the figure ultimately cited by Bosworth was a conservative estimate, and that the amount probably came closer to $13 billion.

The PCGG's first chairperson, Jovito Salonga later said that he estimated the figure of US$5 billion–10 billion, based on the documentary trail left behind by the Marcoses in 1986. Internationally, Salonga's estimate has become the popularly cited estimate of the Marcoses' unexplained wealth, and it is this amount for which the Marcoses were cited by Guinness World Records as having perpetrated the "largest-ever theft from a government" in 1989—a record they still hold in 2022.

However Jesus Estanislao, another noted economist from the Center for Research and Communication, pointed out that this figure reflected amounts taken out of the country in the years immediately prior to the ouster of the Marcos administration, and that there was no way to accurately estimate the wealth acquired by the Marcoses since the 1950s. He suggested that the figure could be as much as $30 billion.

=== Creation (1986) ===
On February 28, 1986, three days after she was inaugurated as President of the Philippines at Club Filipino, Corazon Aquino issued Executive Order No. 1, creating the PCGG, exercising her unique position of having full possession of both legislative and executive powers as president of the new revolutionary government.

Two weeks later on March 12, she signed Executive Order No. 2, freezing the assets of the Marcoses in the Philippines and authorizing the PCGG to negotiate with foreign governments to facilitate the recovery of Marcos assets abroad.

Jovito Salonga, who had advised Aquino on how the commission should be organized, was appointed as its first chairperson.

On June 22, 1987, Aquino issued Presidential Proclamation 131 and Executive Order 229, implementing Article II Section 21 of the constitution, which states that “The State shall promote comprehensive rural development and agrarian reform.” Marcos wealth recovered by the PCGG was automatically appropriated for agrarian reform. This led to the Congressional enactment of Republic Act No. 8532 - the Comprehensive Agrarian Reform Law in 1988, which gave a congressional mandate for the program and formalized the automatic appropriation of PCGG'S recovered funds for that purpose. Since then, funds recovered by the PCGG have funded upwards of 80% of the Philippine budget for the Comprehensive Agrarian Reform Program.

==== Constitutionality ====
The constitutionality of the PCGG was upheld in 2022 when the Sandiganbayan denied a petition challenging the PCGG's creation.

=== Jovito Salonga chairmanship (1986-1987) ===
Jovito Salonga stayed on as chairperson of the PCGG for a year, eventually deciding to run in the 1987 Philippine Senate election after the 1987 Constitution of the Philippines had restored the bicameral Congress of the Philippines.

During Salonga's term as chairperson the PCGG sequestered several billions of pesos worth of property, reached out to the governments of the United States and Switzerland to ask for help in recovering wealth Marcos had stashed in those countries, filed civil cases for the recovery of assets from known Marcos cronies, and entered into settlement deals with Marcos cronies Jose Yao Campos and Antonio Floirendo.

Under Salonga, the PCGG immediately put Aquino's Executive Order No. 2 into effect, sequestering several billions of pesos worth of property, including: the Malacañang jewelry collection; 236 corporations including the United Coconut Planter's Bank (UCPB), Banahaw Broadcasting Corporation (BBC), Intercontinental Broadcasting Corporation (IBC), Radio Philippines Network (RPN), Philippine Communications Satellite Corporation (PhilComSat), Philippine Overseas Telecommunications Company (POTC), Eastern Telecommunications Philippines Inc. (ETPI), Bataan Shipyard and Engineering Company (BASECO), Chemfields Inc., San Miguel Corporation (SMC), and Coconut Investment Corporation; and shares of stock in 143 other companies. In addition, the PCGG secured the Award of Titles to two properties in New Jersey—the ones at Princeton Pike and Pendleton Drive—from the New Jersey Supreme Court. It also began auctioning various Marcos properties, turning over the proceeds to the Bureau of Treasury.

They also began legal proceedings for the first 39 civil cases against the Marcoses and their cronies. In addition to the Marcoses themselves, civil cases were filed against: Alfredo Romualdez, Amando Romualdez, Jose Africa, Andres Genito, Herminio Disini, Alberto Looyuko, Rodolfo Cuenca, Bienvenido Tantoco, Lucio Tan, Fabian Ver, Eduardo Cojangco, Geronimo Velasco, Anos Fonacier, Roman Cruz, Fe Roa Gimenez, Ofelia Trinidad, Alfonso Lim, Major General Josephus Ramas, Jolly Bugarin, Emilio Yap, Luz Bakunawa, Antonio Martel, Vicente Chuidian, Jose De Venecia, Alejo Ganut, BGen Jaime Echeverria, Tomas Dumpit, Ricardo Silverio, Roberto Abling, Peter Sabido, Remedios Argana, Jesus Tanchanco, Roberto Benedicto, and Eduardo Marcelo.

As part of their mandate to institute safeguards to prevent corruption, the PCGG also began pushing for the passage of what would eventually become Republic Act 6713 – the 1987 Code of Conduct and Ethical Standards for Public Officials and Employees.

The PCGG filed a US$200 million claim on 4 Marcos-owned buildings in New York City, which had already been the subject of a Racketeer Influenced and Corrupt Organizations (RICO) case filed by the US Government. The Crown Building at 730 5th Avenue, was eventually sold for US$93.6 million, but the PCGG's share of the proceeds only amounted to US$769,852. The Herald Center on Broadway was eventually sold for US$25 million, but the PCGG only earned a net of US$1.5 million from the sale after mortgages that had been taken on the property were paid. The 40 Wall Street building, which has since been renamed the Trump Building, was sold in a foreclosure sale before the PCGG could make good on its claim. The 200 Madison Avenue property was the last of the properties to be sold in 1993, earning the PCGG a US$189,149 part of the proceeds.

==== Swiss Bank accounts of the Marcoses ====
It was under Salonga that the PCGG first reached out to the Swiss government after a search of documents left by the Marcoses in Malacañang showed that the Marcoses had deposited funds there. The documents revealed that the Marcoses had started depositing money in Swiss banks as early as 1968 – four years prior to the declaration of martial law.

The Swiss government told the PCGG to file a request under the International Mutual Assistance on Criminal Matters (IMAC) Act in order to recover US$340 million which the Marcoses had deposited in Swiss banks.

==== Yao Campos settlement ====
The PCGG under Salonga achieved its first major recovery victory when Marcos crony and UNILAB founder Jose Yao Campos indicated that he wanted to make amends with the new government, and that he wanted to return the Marcos properties and cash which had been put under his name. The PCGG entered into a legal settlement with Campos, in return for which he returned PHP2.5 billion worth of titles to 197 properties in Metro Manila, Rizal, Laguna, Cavite, Bataan, and Baguio, as well as PHP250 million in cash.

==== Floirendo settlement ====
Towards the end of Salonga's term in the PCGG, Banana Magnate Antonio Floirendo also entered into a settlement agreement, returning PHP70 million in cash and assets, including the Lindenmire Estate in Long Island; Olympic Towers in Midtown Manhattan; and 2433 Makiki Heights Drive in Honolulu.

=== Further efforts during the Corazon Aquino Administration (1987-1992) ===
The Aquino administration went through four further PCGG chairpersons before the end of her term in 1992 - Ramon A. Diaz, Adolfo Azcuna, Mateo Armando Caparas, and David Castro.

The mandate of the PCGG received international support when the 44th Session of the United Nations Commission on Human Rights in early 1988 called on UN Member Nations to help in the recovery of funds stolen by the leaders of Haiti and the Philippines. The council said that this was to help “prevent individuals guilty of human rights violations from profiting from their crimes,” and asserted that “The millions of dollars stolen by the deposed leaders of the Philippines and Haiti should be returned to the Filipinos and Haitian people.”

==== Recovery of ill-gotten wealth ====
During this time, the PCGG was able to recover PHP375 million from the Security Bank accounts of Rolando Gapud and Jose Yao Campos, and a further PHP157.7 million from Security Bank Company accounts. The PCGG was also able to sell the Marcoses' Princeton Pike Property in New Jersey for net proceeds of PHP34.59 million, and the Marcoses' Olympic Tower apartments for net proceeds of PHP58.280 million. The PCGG was also able to earn significantly from the auction of the Marcoses' furniture, rugs, books, silverware and artwork, including 99 paintings from the Marcoses' old masters collection - notably "David with the Head of Goliath" by Francisco de Zurbarán, and "The city of venice adoring the Christ child" by Paolo Veronese. The PCGG also successfully appealed to various US District Courts forbidding the Marcoses from selling assets identified for recovery by the Philippine Government.

==== Settlement agreements ====
Several settlements were accepted by the PCGG during this period - with Anthony Lee, Roberto Benedicto, the Meralco Foundation in the case of shared registered under the name of Benjamin Romualdez, and with Imelda Marcos herself in the case of her Sanwa Bank accounts.

The Roberto Benedicto compromise agreement saw the surrender of 32 corporations, US$16 million in Swiss bank deposits, and cash dividends in some of his companies, 100 percent of the shares for California Overseas Bank, 51% of Benedicto's agricultural lands, and shares in television stations IBC 13 and RPN 9. Meantime, the Anthony Lee compromise agreement resulted in the surrender of Lee's shares in Mountainview Real Estate Corporation.

The settlement with Meralco Foundation over the Meralco shares that had been registered under the name of Benjamin Romualdez led to PCGG temporarily gaining control over 22 million Meralco shares. These shares were eventually privatized in three batches - a PHP13.57 billion sale to the SSS and GSIS in 1994; a PHP2.6 billion sale to on October 23, 1997, to Union Fenosa Holdings in 1997; and a PHP53 million sale through Merrill Lynch Far East Ltd. in 1998.

The settlement in a California court case against Imelda Marcos herself resulted in the surrender of PHP11.5 million from her Sanwa Bank accounts, and most of the assets seized by US customs when the Marcoses first went into exile in Honolulu.

==== Continued pursuit of the Marcos Swiss accounts ====
During this time, Swiss Courts ordered the transmission to the Philippines of documents regarding the Marcoses’ deposits in Geneva, Zurich, and Freburg. The Zurich Canton Court ordered the releases the frozen deposits to the Sandiganbayan, which was to determine their rightful owner. The PCGG filed a forfeiture case with the Sandiganbayan to recover the money from these frozen Marcos Swiss accounts.

In 1992 Imelda Marcos threatened to sue the PCGG if they did not return all the property seized from their family "including the shoes, panties and bra."

=== Efforts during the Ramos administration (1992-1998) ===
Magtanggol C. Gunigundo was the sole chair of the PCGG during the entire presidency of Fidel V. Ramos. This period is noted for an attempted compromise deal with Imelda Marcos in 1993 which ultimately did not push through because of public opposition.

=== Efforts during the Estrada and Arroyo administrations (1998-2010) ===
Chairmanship of the PCGG changed hands thrice during the brief term President Joseph Estrada, through the early months of the succeeding administration of President Gloria Macapagal Arroyo. Arroyo eventually appointed former Peace Process and Human Rights advocate Haydee Yorac to the post. Yorac served until 2005 when she decided to run for a seat in the Senate. Chairmanship was passed on the Camilo Sabio in an acting capacity from 2005 to 2010.

==== 2007 Transfer of supervision to the Department of Justice ====
While the PCGG was, for twenty-one years been under the supervision and control of the Office of the President, this institutional setup was changed when President Gloria Macapagal Arroyo issued Executive Order No. 643 on July 27, 2007, placing the PCGG under the administrative supervision of the Department of Justice. (The case of Pimentel, JUNIOR. v. Pagdanganan distinguishes between supervision and control: In administrative law, supervision means overseeing or the power or authority of an officer to see that subordinate officers perform their duties. If the latter fail or neglect to fulfill them, the former may take such action or step as prescribed by law to make them perform their duties. Control, on the other hand, means the power of an officer to alter or modify or nullify or set aside what a subordinate officer ha[s] done in the performance of his duties and to substitute the judgment of the former for that of the latter.") Notwithstanding the clear direction under Section 2 of Executive Order No. 643, no implementing guidelines have ever been issued by the Justice Department.

==== Corruption scandals ====
In 2008, the PCGG was implicated by corruption scandals after allegations came out that PCGG commissioners were "milking" sequestered surrendered corporations, using excess foreign travel allowances, and taking cash advances without liquidation.

=== Efforts during the Benigno Aquino III administration (2010-2016) ===
Andres Bautista was appointed chair of the PCGG during the administration of President Benigno Aquino III, serving for most of Aquino III's term until Bautista was appointed head of the Philippines' Commission on Elections in 2015. Richard Roger Amurao then served as chair in acting capacity for the rest of Aquino's term.

==== Proposal to wind down operations ====
In January 2013, the commission proposed to wind down operations and transfer its operations respectively to the Department of Justice and the Office of the Solicitor General and the Department of Finance for the pending civil litigation and the disposal of assets sequestered in the past years.

=== Efforts during the Duterte administration (2016-2022) ===
On November 24, 2016, President Rodrigo Duterte informed the public that he wanted the powers of the PCGG expanded to cover the ill-gotten wealth of other corrupt public officials and not just the Marcoses and their cronies.

On June 4, 2019, Duterte ordered the PCGG to auction the ₱700 million worth of Imelda Marcos' jewelry collection.

== Past chairpersons ==
The following is a list of previous chairpersons of the PCGG:

| Name | Term | Appointed by |
|---|---|---|
| Jovito Salonga | February 28, 1986 – March 5, 1987 | Corazon Aquino |
| Ramon A. Diaz | March 9, 1987 – August 12, 1988 | Corazon Aquino |
| Adolfo Azcuna (Note: Acting capacity) | July 14–August 14, 1988 | Corazon Aquino |
| Mateo Caparas | August 15, 1988 – August 31, 1990 | Corazon Aquino |
| David M. Castro | September 1, 1990 – June 30, 1992 | Corazon Aquino |
| Magtanggol C. Gunigundo | July 1, 1992 – June 30, 1998 | Fidel V. Ramos |
| Felix M. De Guzman | July 2, 1998 – October 27, 1998 | Joseph Estrada |
| Alexander Gesmundo | October 28, 1998 – November 2, 1998 | Joseph Estrada |
| Magdangal B. Elma | November 4, 1998 – February 16, 2001 | Joseph Estrada |
| Jorge V. Sarmiento | February 21, 2001 – July 16, 2001 | Gloria Macapagal Arroyo |
| Haydee Yorac | July 17, 2001 – September 12, 2005 | Gloria Macapagal Arroyo |
| Camilo Sabio | May 2, 2005 – September 12, 2010 | Gloria Macapagal Arroyo |
| Andres Bautista | September 13, 2010 – April 27, 2015 | Benigno Aquino III |
| Richard Roger Amurao | May 14, 2015 – June 30, 2016 | Benigno Aquino III |
| Reynold S. Munsayac | September 12, 2016 – July 31, 2021 | Rodrigo Duterte |
| John A. Agbayani | September 13, 2021 – April 22, 2024 | Rodrigo Duterte |
| Melchor Quirino C. Sadang | April 22, 2024 – present | Ferdinand Marcos Jr. |

== See also ==
- Operation Big Bird
