= Neri v. Senate =

- Court: Supreme Court of the Philippines en banc

Full case name
- Romulo L. Neri v. Senate Committee on Accountability of Public Officers and Investigations, Senate Committee on Trade and Commerce, and Senate Committee on National Defense and Security
- Decided: March 25, 2008
- G.R. number: 180643
- Citation: 572 Phil. 554; 549 SCRA 77

Case history
- Subsequent action(s): Motion for reconsideration filed April 8, 2008, denied with finality September 4
- Ponente: Leonardo-De Castro, joined by Justices Quisumbing and Reyes
- Separate opinion: Ynares-Santiago
- Concurrence: Brion
- Concurrence: Chico-Nazario
- Concurrence: Corona
- Concurrence: Nachura
- Concurrence: Tinga
- Concurrence: Velasco Jr.
- Concur/dissent: Carpio
- Dissent: Puno, joined by Azcuna and Austria-Martinez
- Dissent: Carpio-Morales
- Dissent: Santiago
- Dissent: Morales

Neri v. Senate, 572 Phil. 554 (2008), is a controversial 9–6 ruling of the Supreme Court of the Philippines which affirmed the invocation of executive privilege by petitioner Romulo Neri, member of the Cabinet of President Gloria Macapagal Arroyo, regarding questions asked during a Congressional inquiry on the controversial multimillion-dollar National Broadband Network (NBN) Project. The Supreme Court finally affirmed this ruling on September 4 and 23, 2008 by denying the defendant Senate Committees' first and second Motions for Reconsideration.

== The facts and the Court's ruling ==
Petitioner Romulo Neri, then Director General of the National Economic and Development Authority (NEDA), was invited by the respondent Senate Committees to attend their joint investigation on the alleged anomalies in the National Broadband Network (NBN) Project. This project was contracted by the Philippine Government with the Chinese firm Zhong Xing Telecommunications Equipment (ZTE), which involved the amount of US$329,481,290. When he testified before the Senate Committees, he disclosed that then Commission on Elections Chairman Benjamin Abalos, brokering for ZTE, offered him P200 million in exchange for his approval of the NBN Project. He further narrated that he informed President Gloria Macapagal Arroyo about the bribery attempt and that she instructed him not to accept the bribe. However, when probed further on what they discussed about the NBN Project, petitioner refused to answer, invoking "executive privilege." In particular, he refused to answer the questions on 1.) whether or not the President followed up the NBN Project, 2.) whether or not she directed him to prioritize it, and 3.) whether or not she directed him to approve it.

Later on, respondent Committees issued a Subpoena Ad Testificandum to petitioner, requiring him to appear and testify on November 20, 2007. However, Executive Secretary Eduardo Ermita sent a letter dated November 15 to the Committees requesting them to dispense with Neri's testimony on the ground of executive privilege. Ermita invoked the privilege on the ground that "the information sought to be disclosed might impair our diplomatic as well as economic relations with the People’s Republic of China," and given the confidential nature in which this information was conveyed to the President, Neri "cannot provide the Committee any further details of these conversations, without disclosing the very thing the privilege is designed to protect." Thus, on November 20, Neri did not appear before the respondent Committees.

On November 22, respondents issued a Show Cause Letter to Neri requiring him to show cause why he should not be cited for contempt for his failure to attend the scheduled hearing on November 20. On November 29, Neri replied to the Show Cause Letter and explained that he did not intend to snub the Senate hearing, and requested that if there be new matters that were not yet taken up during his first appearance, he be informed in advance so he can prepare himself. He added that his non-appearance was upon the order of the President, and that his conversation with her dealt with delicate and sensitive national security and diplomatic matters relating to the impact of the bribery scandal involving high government officials and the possible loss of confidence of foreign investors and lenders in the Philippines. Respondents found the explanation unsatisfactory, and later on issued an Order citing Neri in contempt and consequently ordering his arrest and detention at the Office of the Senate Sergeant-At-Arms until he appears and gives his testimony.

=== Filing of the petition ===
Neri filed this petition asking the Court to nullify both the Show Cause Letter and the Contempt Order for having been issued with grave abuse of discretion amounting to lack or excess of jurisdiction, and stressed that his refusal to answer the three questions was anchored on a valid claim to executive privilege in accordance with the ruling in the landmark case of Senate v. Ermita (G.R. No. 169777, April 20, 2006). For its part, the Senate Committees argued that they did not exceed their authority in issuing the assailed orders because there is no valid justification for Neri's claim to executive privilege. In addition, they claimed that the refusal of petitioner to answer the three questions violates the people’s right to public information, and that the executive is using the concept of executive privilege as a means to conceal the criminal act of bribery in the highest levels of government.

=== The main issue and the Court's ruling ===
The main substantial issue sought to be resolved in the case was whether the three questions that petitioner Neri refused to answer were covered by executive privilege, making the arrest order issued by the respondent Senate Committees void.

The divided Supreme Court (voting 9-6) was convinced that the three questions are covered by presidential communications privilege, and that this privilege has been validly claimed by the executive department, enough to shield petitioner Neri from any arrest order the Senate may issue against him for not answering such questions.

== Validity of claim to executive privilege ==
Citing the case of United States v. Nixon (418 U.S. 683), the Court laid out the three elements needed to be complied with in order for the claim to executive privilege to be valid. These are: 1.) the protected communication must relate to a quintessential and non-delegable presidential power; 2.) it must be authored, solicited, and received by a close advisor of the President or the President himself. The judicial test is that an advisor must be in "operational proximity" with the President; and, 3.) it may be overcome by a showing of adequate need, such that the information sought "likely contains important evidence," and by the unavailability of the information elsewhere by an appropriate investigating authority.

Anent the first element, executive privilege may be validly claimed by the executive department only in cases where the power subject of the legislative inquiry is expressly granted by the Constitution to the President. Such powers include the commander-in-chief, appointing, pardoning, and diplomatic powers. In light of the doctrine of separation of powers, the said powers of the President enjoy a greater degree of confidentiality than other presidential powers. In the present case, Executive Secretary Ermita claimed executive privilege on the argument that the communications elicited by the three questions "fall under conversation and correspondence between the President and public officials" necessary in "her executive and policy decision-making process," and that "the information sought to be disclosed might impair our diplomatic as well as economic relations with the People’s Republic of China." It is clear then that the basis of the claim is a matter related to the quintessential and non-delegable presidential power of diplomacy or foreign relations.

As to the second element, the communications were received by a close advisor of the President. Under the "operational proximity" test, petitioner Neri can be considered a close advisor, being a member of the President's Cabinet.

And as to the third element, there is no adequate showing of a compelling need that would justify the limitation of the privilege and of the unavailability of the information elsewhere by an appropriate investigating authority. Presidential communications are presumptively privileged and that the presumption can be overcome only by a mere showing of public need by the branch seeking access to such conversations. In the present case, respondent Committees failed to show a compelling or critical need for the answers to the three questions in the enactment of any law under Sec. 21, Art. VI. Instead, the questions veer more towards the exercise of the legislative oversight function under Sec. 22, Art. VI. As ruled in Senate v. Ermita, "the oversight function of Congress may be facilitated by compulsory process only to the extent that it is performed in pursuit of legislation."

== Compulsory process and Congress' oversight function ==
In determining whether Congress correctly ordered Neri's arrest for his refusal to answer the three questions, a distinction must be first laid down between Sections 21 and 22, Article VI of the Philippine Constitution. Sec. 21 relates to the power to conduct inquiries in aid of legislation. Its aim is to elicit information that may be used for the enactment of laws. On the other hand, Sec. 22 pertains to the power to conduct a question hour, the objective of which is to obtain information in pursuit of Congress' oversight function over the executive department. Compulsory process is available in Congress' exercise of its powers under Sec. 21. In Sec. 22, it is NOT.

Senate v. Ermita is clear: "When Congress merely seeks to be informed on how department heads are implementing the statutes which it has issued, its right to such information is not as imperative as that of the President to whom, as Chief Executive, such department heads must give a report of their performance as a matter of duty. In such instances, Section 22, in keeping with the separation of powers, states that Congress may only request their appearance. Nonetheless, when the inquiry in which Congress requires their appearance is ‘in aid of legislation’ under Section 21, the appearance is mandatory."

== Use of executive privilege in concealing a crime ==
Respondent Committees argue that a claim of executive privilege does not guard against a possible disclosure of a crime or wrongdoing. The Court does not contest this. It has been settled that the specific need for evidence in a pending criminal trial outweighs the President’s generalized interest in confidentiality. However, the present case does not involve a criminal proceeding where the information sought from Neri would help in meeting the demands of fair administration of criminal justice. Instead, the present controversy arose from a legislative inquiry. There is a clear difference between Congress' legislative tasks and the responsibility of a criminal court. While fact-finding by a legislative committee is undeniably a part of its task, legislative judgments normally depend more on the predicted consequences of proposed legislative actions and their political acceptability, than on precise reconstruction of past events; Congress frequently legislates on the basis of conflicting information provided in its hearings. In contrast, the responsibility of the criminal court turns entirely on its ability to determine whether there is probable cause to believe that certain named individuals did or did not commit specific crimes.

== Executive privilege and the people's right to information ==
Petitioner Neri appeared before the respondent Committees and answered all of their questions except the three where he claimed executive privilege. Nevertheless, his refusal to answer based on the claim of executive privilege does not violate the people's right to information on matters of public concern simply because Sec. 7, Art. III of the Constitution itself provides that this right is "subject to such limitations as may be provided by law." As correctly pleaded by Neri, he is precluded from divulging the answers to the three questions by Sec. 7 of R.A. 6713, Article 229 of the Revised Penal Code, Sec. 3(k) of R.A. 3019, and Section 24(e), Rule 130 of the Rules of Court. These are in addition to the larger concept of executive privilege, which recognizes the public interest in the confidentiality of certain information.

== Right of Congress to information and the right to public information ==
In addition, respondent Committees have a wrong understanding of the people's right to public information. The right of Congress or any of its Committees to obtain information in aid of legislation cannot be equated with the people’s right to public information. As laid down in Senate v. Ermita, "the demand of a citizen for the production of documents pursuant to his right to information does not have the same obligatory force as a subpoena duces tecum issued by Congress. Neither does the right to information grant a citizen the power to exact testimony from government officials. These powers belong only to Congress, not to an individual citizen."

Even if Congress is composed of representatives elected by the people, it does not follow, except in a highly qualified sense, that in every exercise of its power of inquiry, the people are exercising their right to information. The members of respondent Committees should not invoke as justification in their exercise of power a right properly belonging to the people in general. This is because when they discharge their power, they do so as public officials and members of Congress.

== Abuse of discretion in ordering Neri's arrest ==
In fine, the Court gave five reasons for ruling that respondents exceeded their authority in issuing the assailed orders:

1.) There being a legitimate claim of executive privilege, the issuance of the contempt Order is void.

2.) Respondents did not comply with the requirement laid down in Senate v. Ermita that the invitations should contain the "possible needed statute which prompted the need for the inquiry," along with "the usual indication of the subject of inquiry and the questions relative to and in furtherance thereof," as required in Sec. 21 and 22, Art. VI of the Constitution.

3.) Only a minority of the Senate Blue Ribbon Committee was present during the deliberation for the issuance of the contempt Order. This is in violation of Sec. 18 of the Rules of Procedure Governing Inquiries in Aid of Legislation, which provides that "the Committee, by a vote of majority of all its members, may punish for contempt any witness before it who disobeys any order of the Committee or refuses to be sworn or to testify or to answer proper questions by the Committee or any of its members."

4.) Respondents violated Sec. 21, Art. VI of the Philippine Constitution, requiring that the inquiry be in accordance with the "duly published rules of procedure." This requires the Senate of every Congress to publish its rules of procedure governing inquiries in aid of legislation because every Senate is distinct from the one before it or after it. Since Senatorial elections are held every three years for one-half of the Senate’s membership, the composition of the Senate also changes by the end of each term. Each Senate may thus enact a different set of rules as it may deem fit. Not having published its Rules of Procedure, the subject hearings in aid of legislation conducted by the 14th Senate are therefore procedurally infirm.

5.) The issuance of the contempt Order is arbitrary and precipitate. The respondent Committees did not first pass upon the claim of executive privilege and inform petitioner of their ruling. Instead, they dismissed his explanation as "unsatisfactory" and simultaneously issued the Order citing him in contempt and ordering his immediate arrest and detention, even if he has expressed his desire to appear before them to answer other questions except those covered by executive privilege.

== Doctrines laid down ==
1.) Compulsory process in legislative proceedings can only be exercised by Congress in inquiries in aid of legislation under Sec. 21 Art. VI, and not in the exercise of its oversight function under Sec. 22 Art. VI.

2.) Executive privilege cannot be used to conceal a crime or a possible wrongdoing. Thus, the specific need for evidence in a pending criminal trial outweighs the President’s generalized interest in confidentiality. However, there is a difference between a criminal investigation and a legislative inquiry, and the presumption in favor of confidentiality precedes the right to demand information if the information is elicited in legislative inquiries and not in criminal investigations.

3.) The right of Congress or any of its Committees to obtain information in aid of legislation cannot be equated with the people’s right to public information. The demand of a citizen for the production of documents pursuant to his right to information does not have the same obligatory force as a subpoena duces tecum issued by Congress. In the exercise of its power, Congress cannot invoke a right properly belonging to the people in general. This is because when they discharge their power, they do so as public officials and members of Congress.

== See also ==
- NBN–ZTE deal corruption scandal
