= Magtanggol =

Magtanggol can refer to any of the following barangays in the Philippines:

- Magtanggol, barangay in the municipality of Pateros, Metro Manila
- Magtanggol, barangay in the city of Muñoz, Nueva Ecija
- Magtanggol, barangay in the municipality of Bongabon, Nueva Ecija

== See also ==
- Magtanggol C. Gunigundo
- Magtanggol Gunigundo I
- Magtanggol Gatdula
- Victor Magtanggol
- Terry Adevoso, also known as Terry Magtanggol
