= Pinugay Earth Station =

Satellite station in Rizal, Philippines

- Established: 1967
- Research type: Satellite ground station
- Location: Baras, Rizal, Philippines; 14°35′04.4″N 121°17′37.0″E
- Operating agency: Philippine Communications Satellite Corporation

The Philippine Space Communications Center or the Pinugay Earth Station is a satellite earth station in Baras, Rizal, Philippines under the Philippine Communications Satellite Corporation (Philcomsat).

== History ==
The Philippine government had a joint project with the Philippine Communications Satellite Corporation (Philcomsat) to build a ground station. The provisional earth station was established in barangay Pinugay in Baras, Rizal in 1967.

In May 1968, President Ferdinand Marcos formally inaugurated a permanent earth station in Rizal. The first standard "A" antenna, Pinugay I was set up.

The station enabled people based in Asia to watch the broadcast of the Apollo 11 launch in 1969.

From 1971 to 1983, Pinugay II, Pinugay III and a standard "B" antenna was set up.

On April 30, 1982, Marcos issued Presidential Decree No. 1845 declaring an 3-kilometer (1.9 mi) security zone around the site.

The now outdated Pinugay I was superseded by Pinugay IV in 1989.

Despite the declaration the area has been occupied by farmers and in 1992, the Department of Agriculture declared the Pinugay area as under the Comprehensive Agrarian Reform Program (CARP). A land dispute arises which persisted at least the early 2000s.
