= Cielito Habito =

Filipino economist, professor, and columnist

Cielito F. Habito

8th Director-General of the National Economic and Development Authority Concurrently Secretary of Socioeconomic Planning
- In office 30 June 1992 – 30 June 1998
- President: Fidel V. Ramos
- Preceded by: Cayetano Paderanga, Jr.
- Succeeded by: Felipe Medalla

Personal details
- Born: 20 April 1953 (age 73) Cabuyao, Laguna
- Education: University of the Philippines Los Baños (BS); University of New England (MA); Harvard University (PhD)
- Profession: Economist; Professor; Columnist

Cielito Flores Habito (born 20 April 1953 in Cabuyao, Laguna) or "Ciel" Habito is a Filipino economist, professor, and columnist. He served concurrently as the Director-General of the National Economic and Development Authority and Socio-Economic Planning Secretary during the Ramos administration.

He is one of the 1991 Ten Outstanding Young Men Awardees for Economics.

== Early life and education ==
Habito was born on 20 April 1953 in Cabuyao, Laguna. He studied at the Maquiling School in Los Baños for grade school, then at the Philippine Science High School for secondary education. He attended the University of the Philippines Los Baños for his tertiary education, earning a degree in agriculture, major in agricultural economics and graduating summa cum laude.

He then attended the University of New England in Armidale, New South Wales, Australia, where he earned a Master of Economics degree. He also obtained a Master of Arts in Economics and a Doctor of Philosophy in Economics at the Harvard University in Cambridge, Massachusetts.

== Career ==
=== Academic career ===
Habito began his academic career at the UPLB Department of Economics, where he was among its pioneering faculty members. He later served as the department's fourth chair in 1987. Habito currently teaches Economics at the Ateneo de Manila University. He was also director of the Ateneo Center for Economic Research and Development, a research unit in economics and economic policy at the same university, before being succeeded by Dr. Leonardo Lanzona.

=== Columnist ===
He writes a weekly column entitled No Free Lunch in the Philippine Daily Inquirer's opinion section. From August 2003 to June 2010, he wrote for the same newspaper's business section. Before writing for the Inquirer, his column was formerly published at The Manila Times.

In 2012, Habito and the Inquirer published a book featuring a selection of his previous articles for the newspaper.

Preceded by Cayetano Paderanga, Jr.	Director-General of the National Economic and Development Authority; 1992 – 1998	Succeeded by Felipe Medalla
