= Ramon del Rosario =

Filipino politician and businessman

Secretary of Finance
- Ad interim
- In office July 1, 1992 – June 1, 1993
- President: Fidel V. Ramos
- Preceded by: Jesus Estanislao
- Succeeded by: Ernest Leung

Personal details
- Education: De La Salle University (BA); Harvard Business School (MBA)

Ramon del Rosario is a Filipino government official and businessman. He was the Secretary of Finance from 1992 to 1993. He is currently the CEO of PHINMA, a Filipino company specializing in education.

Political offices
Preceded by Jesus Estanislao	Secretary of Finance; 1992-1993	Succeeded by Ernest Leung
