= CaseIT =

Case competition in Canada

CaseIT is an international undergraduate business case competition focused in management information systems. Held annually in Vancouver, British Columbia, this student-organized event focuses on information technology case analysis. Over a span of six days in February, 20 international university teams compete in a 5-hour and 24-hour case deliberation. First round presentations are held in SFU's Harbour Centre campus in Vancouver, while final-round presentations are held in the Segal Graduate School of Business, followed by an Awards Banquet where the top three universities are announced.

== History ==
Co-founded in 2004 by Paul Cyr and Zephaniah Wong, CaseIT began as a competition between undergraduate teams within Simon Fraser University. Jenny Chao (2005) expanded the competition to incorporate teams from Western Canada, and in the following year, Andrew Kumar drew teams from across Canada. In 2007, Somnath Suresh included teams from the United States and Denmark and in the following year, Rey Lim changed the format into a 24-hour case competition with international teams from Africa and Asia. Steven Chia stabilized the growth of CaseIT in 2009 by formalizing and institutionalizing many processes. Furthering the progression of CaseIT, Nima Sarhangpour played an integral role in the incorporation of the CaseIT Foundation. CaseIT 2012 also saw the first University from Australia take part in the event. CaseIT 2014 saw the addition of the Wildcard Round through Jillian-Joy Marlinga. Gwendoline Wong increased the number of teams competing to 19 team for CaseIT 2015 and combined the Discussion Panel and the Corporate Evening events. In addition, Gwendoline launched InTech, a case competition held parallel to the international competition exclusively for students at Simon Fraser University.

In 2018, the CaseIT organizing committee created a satellite competition called PIVOT. This took the format of a one-day local ideathon and was launched to provide a platform for BC-based students to showcase their skills and talents to the business community. CaseIT 2018 saw the first time roll-out of a two-case competition format as well as the Wildcard round, effectively allowing competitors more opportunities to showcase their skills and knowledge.

== Competition ==
=== Organizing Committee ===
Since its inception, CaseIT has been a student-organized event. Originally consisting of a committee of 16 members, it has since grown to 48 members. The Organizing Committee consists of the Chairs, Vice Chairs, Directors, Coordinators and Team Hosts.

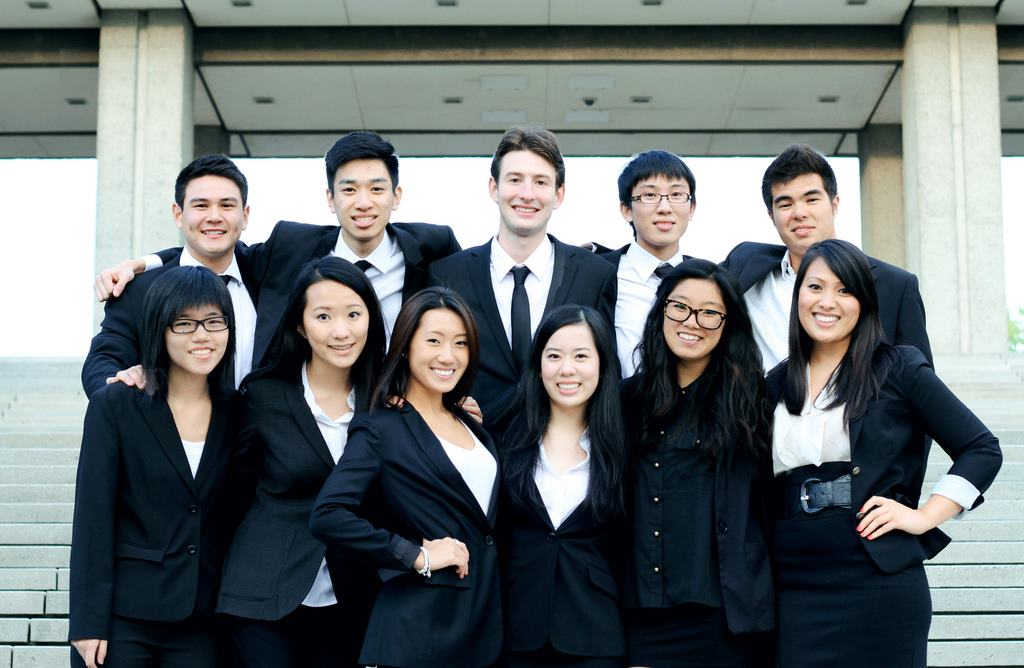
CaseIT 2013 Organizing Committee

Year	Chair	Vice-Chair(s)
2025	Aliya Hussain	Jarl Arciaga & Alan Lam
2024	Braden Lo	Meaghan Lin, Marcus Wu, & Bryan Li
2023	Vanessa Chau	
2022	Emily Kim	Rachel Dee & Rachel Vicencio
2021	Jordan Wong	Jenny Lian & Kyle Lee
2020	Ricky Dang	Jaclyn Rainbow & Adrienne Nogueras
2019	Michelle Chen	Peyton Winslade
2018	Madeline Millsip	Kim Venn
2017	Flora Yang	Zachary Chua & Gianna Wu
2016	Moses To	Tiffany Fong & Sunny Kim
2015	Gwendoline Wong	Cheryl Chan
2014	Jillian-Joy Marlinga	Nicholas Heng
2013	Peter Lew	Maggie Lee
2012	Nima Sarhangpour	Gordon Swenson
2011	Brian Luong	Ryan Torio
2010	May Yu	Stephen Lee
2009	Steven Chia	Amanda Yeo
2008	Rey Lim	Paulina Siu
2007	Somnath Suresh	Gloria Ching
2006	Andrew Kumar	Tabitha Mui
2005	Jenny Chao	Zephaniah Wong
2004	Paul Cyr	Zephaniah Wong

=== Participants ===
Since the competition opened to schools from around the world, CaseIT has hosted university teams from Africa, Asia, Europe, and North America. Some notable participating schools in the past include:

- Bocconi University School of Economics
- Tepper School of Business, Carnegie Mellon University
- Carlson School of Management, University of Minnesota
- Chinese University of Hong Kong
- Chulalongkorn University
- Corvinus University of Budapest
- Copenhagen Business School
- John Molson School of Business, Concordia University
- Deakin University
- Haskayne School of Business, University of Calgary
- HEC Montréal
- Hong Kong University of Technology and Science
- Kelley School of Business, Indiana University
- Korea University Business School
- Maastricht University
- McMaster University
- National University of Singapore
- Queen's University, Smith School of Business
- Queensland University of Technology
- Richard Ivey School of Business, University of Western Ontario
- Royal Roads University
- Ryerson University (now Toronto Metropolitan University)
- Sauder School of Business, University of British Columbia
- Singapore Management University
- Technological University Dublin
- Universidad Panamericana
- University of Alberta
- University of Hong Kong
- University of Manchester
- University of Vermont
- Wilfrid Laurier University

=== Results ===
Twenty teams are chosen through an invitational process to participate in the 24-hour case deliberation held in Vancouver. Participants have 24 hours to solve and present their team's solution to a judging panel composed of industry professionals from CaseIT sponsor companies which range in a variety of firms. From these teams, one finalist is chosen from each tier after the first round of presentations. After the final round of presentations, the top three teams are selected by the judging panel. The past results of CaseIT are shown below with the corresponding theme for each year.

Year	Theme	1st place	2nd place	3rd place
2025		University of Manchester	Wilfrid Laurier University	Corvinus University of Budapest
2024		HEC Montréal	University of Washington	Ivey School of Business (Western University)
2023		Smith School of Business (Queen's University)	Maastricht University	University of Minnesota
2022		Maastricht University	Rotman School of Management (University of Toronto)	Kelley School of Business (Indiana University)
2021		Rotterdam School of Management (Erasmus University)	Kelley School of Business (Indiana University)	Maastricht University
2020		Kelley School of Business (Indiana University)	Smith School of Business (Queen's University)	Aarhus University
2019	Speed of Technology	Kelley School of Business (Indiana University)	Smith School of Business (Queen's University)	Ryerson University
2018	15 Years of CaseIT	Université libre de Bruxelles	Kelley School of Business (Indiana University)	Queen's University
2017	Augmented Reality: The Future at Your Fingertips	Kelley School of Business (Indiana University)	Queen's University	Haskayne School of Business (University of Calgary)
2016	Cognitive Analytics: Adapting Machine for Thought	Queen's University	Copenhagen Business School	Corvinus University of Budapest
2015	The Internet of Things: Challenges of the Future	University of Manchester	Queen's University	Indiana University
2014	Big Data: Mining Decisions	University of British Columbia	Queensland University of Technology	Queen's University
2013	Mobility: World Within Reach	Kwantlen Polytechnic University	Queen's University	Ryerson University
2012	Security: Safeguarding Success	Kwantlen Polytechnic University	National University of Singapore	Kelley School of Business (Indiana University)
2011	Analytics: Insight into the Future	Queen's University	Kelley School of Business (Indiana University)	National University of Singapore
2010	Cloud Computing: Opportunity is in the Forecast	Bocconi University	Kelley School of Business (Indiana University)	National University of Singapore
2009	Green IT: Sustaining Success	National University of Singapore	Ryerson University	Kwantlen Polytechnic University
2008	Hello World: The Value of Social Networks	Simon Fraser University	Singapore Management University	Haskayne School of Business (University of Calgary)
2007	Driving Innovation	Haskayne School of Business (University of Calgary)	Royal Roads University	Copenhagen Business School
2006	Triumphs and Trainwrecks: Getting It Right	Haskayne School of Business (University of Calgary)	Royal Roads University	Queen's University
2005	-	Royal Roads University	Kwantlen Polytechnic University	Haskayne School of Business (University of Calgary)

=== Venues ===
Venues for CaseIT may change from year-to-year. The following venues are where CaseIT was held in past years.

Morris J. Wosk Centre for Dialogue

The Asia Pacific Hall served as the inspiration for the original CaseIT logo, as the platform where competitors would present.

Vancouver Aquarium

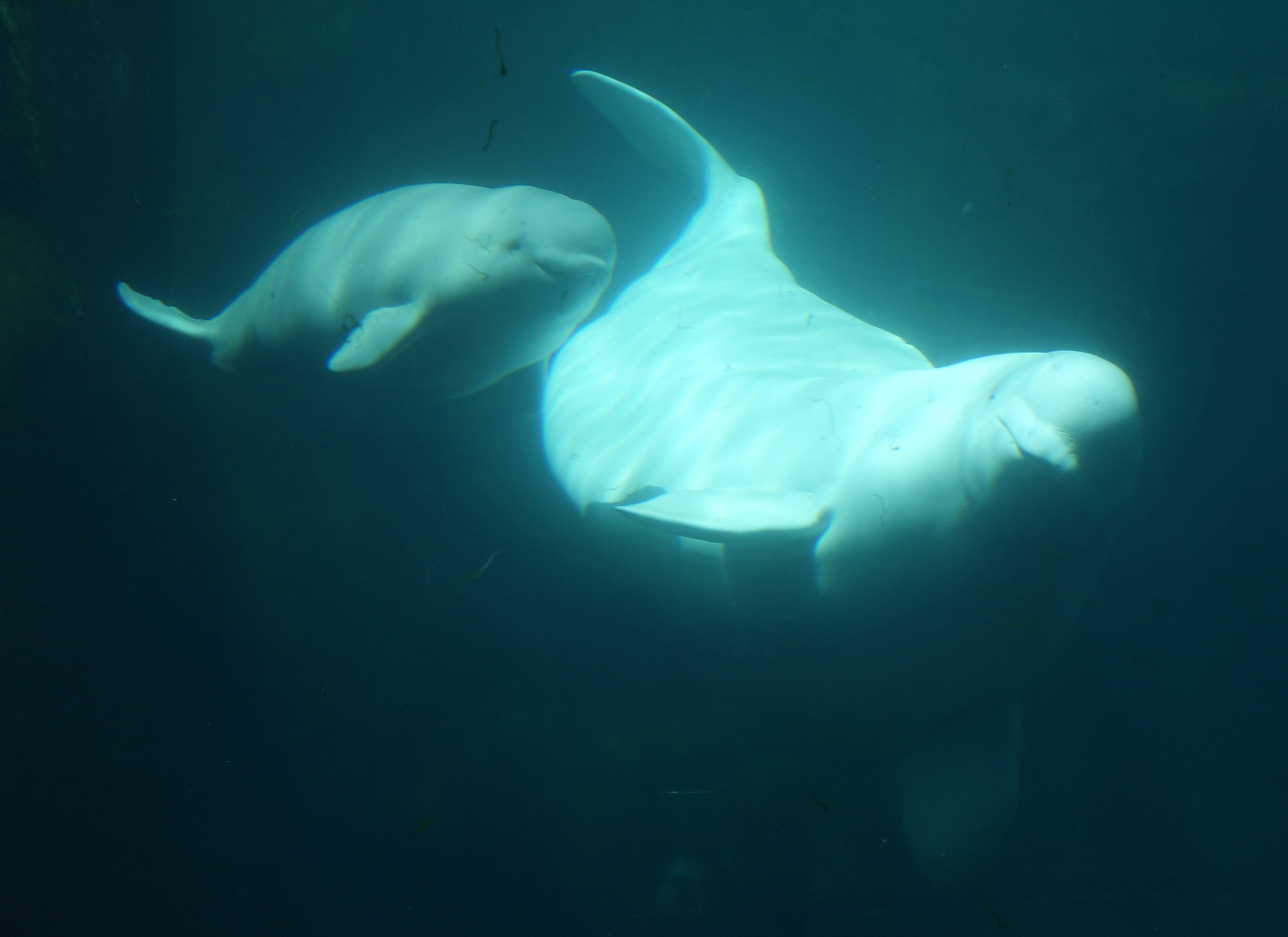
Vancouver Aquarium

The Corporate Function is held at the Arctic Canada Gallery at the Vancouver Aquarium. Located in Vancouver's Stanley Park, the Vancouver Aquarium was Canada's first public aquarium when it opened in 1956. Participants network with one another while watching beluga whales swim by.

Harbour Centre

After the 24-hour deliberation period, 21 teams present their first round presentations here showcasing their analytical and presentation skills to the CaseIT Judging Panel.

Segal Graduate School of Business The top four universities are announced here and present their recommendations for a second time to over 150 attendees.
