= Bernardo Villegas =

Filipino economist and writer

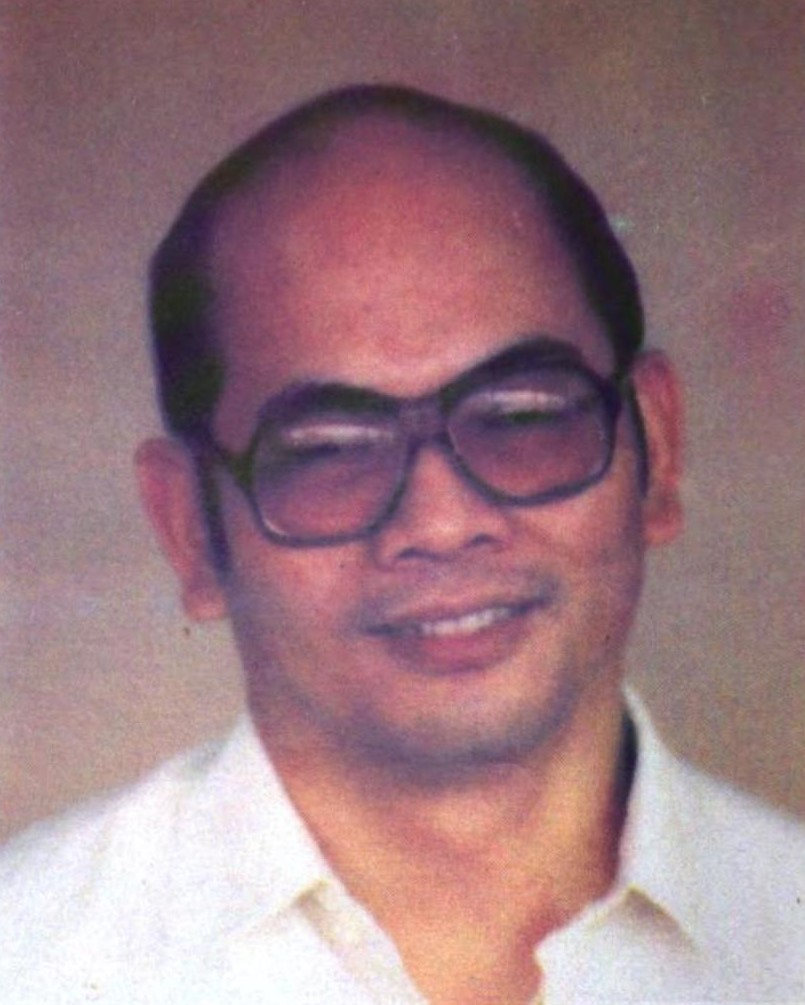
- Villegas from the Official Directory of the Constitutional Commission, c. 1986
- Born: March 12, 1939 (age 87)
- Occupations: Economist, Professor

Academic background
- Education: De La Salle University (AB); Harvard University (PhD)

Bernardo Malvar Villegas (born March 12, 1939) is a Filipino economist and writer best known for being one of the framers of the 1987 Philippine Constitution, for authoring a number of widely used Philippine economics textbooks, and for his role in the founding of two influential Philippine business organizations, the Center for Research and Communication and the Makati Business Club.

He is also known for advising Philippine presidents since the Fifth Philippine Republic came into power in 1986, and as a professor and vice president at the University of Asia and the Pacific, as well as visiting professor at the IESE Business School in Barcelona.

== Education ==
Villegas is a Certified Public Accountant, having obtained his bachelor's degree in commerce and the humanities (both summa cum laude) from De La Salle University. He later earned his doctorate degree in economics at the Harvard University, becoming a teaching fellow at Harvard's College of Arts and Sciences at the age of 21.

While at Harvard, Villegas and Filipino fellow-student Jesus Estanislao attended activities organized by Opus Dei and became members, before returning to the Philippines in 1964.

== Center for Research and Communication and Makati Business Club ==
On August 15, 1967, Villegas and Estanislao formally established the Center For Research and Communication, a non-profit private research center that served as a think tank for private sector businesses and a provider of economics training programs.

In 1981, Villegas became a member of the founding Executive Board of the Makati Business Club, a forum to address economic and social policy issues which affect the development of the Philippines, together with Enrique Zobel and former ambassador Jose V. Romero Jr. Villegas remains a member of the board of trustees.

== Constitutional Commission of 1986 ==
As a prominent Philippine economist towards the end of the Marcos dictatorship and a key member of both the Center for Research and Communication and the Makati Business Club, Villegas played an important role in Philippine history during the mid-1980s. The Philippine economy had been in decline since 1981 and went into a full nosedive in early 1983 after the US increased interest rates, sparking a series of events that led to the ouster of Ferdinand Marcos in 1986. Villegas' expertise as an economist led to him being appointed as a Chairman of the National Economy and Patrimony Article for the Philippine Constitutional Commission of 1986, which framed the Philippines' new democratic constitution that would be ratified by plebiscite in 1987.

When it came to voting on whether the Philippines should adopt a unicameral or bicameral legislature, Villegas was among those who voted for bicameralism, narrowly outvoting those who favored unicameralism by one vote (23 to 22). In favoring a bicameral legislature, Villegas stated that: "As long as a Senate will be elected at large, I am in favor of a bicameral form of government. [...] I see the Lower House as the individuals who will be experts on 'trees.' Now we need some people who will be experts on the 'forest' to take a look at all of these legitimate vested interests."

At the closing session of the commission, its President Cecilia Muñoz-Palma recognized Villegas' signature contributions to the constitution:

"...principles of solidarity and subsidiarity and the social function of property in the Article on the National Economy, and the right to life of the unborn from conception."

According to his own account, Villegas was part of the minority which objected to the protectionist stance taken by the constitution against foreign investors. However, the majority prevailed and provisions were added to limit the potential role of foreign investors in key sectors of the Philippine economy.

Villegas also played a part in the efforts to recover the unexplained wealth of the Marcos family. Philippine Ambassador to Italy Jose Romero Jr. recalls in his book, "Philippine Political Economy: The Marcos Years", that Dr. Villegas was the source US Ambassador to the Philippines Stephen Bosworth had referred to when he testified to the United States Congress House Committee on Foreign Affairs that about US$10 billion worth of capital had left the Philippines since the Philippine economy went into a nosedive in 1983. The PCGG later cited a similar amount as an estimate of the unexplained wealth of Ferdinand and Imelda Marcos.

As one of the framers of the 1987 constitution, Villegas is considered an amicus curiae (friend of the court) by the Philippine Supreme Court.

In 2024, Philippine Constitutional Commission of 1986 framer Villegas at the Philippine Senate Committee on Constitutional Amendments and Revision of Codes hearing, rejected Charter change “We do not need to amend the Constitution, especially as regards [to] media, advertising, education, and ownership of land at this stage of our development”.

== University of Asia and the Pacific and current roles ==
In 1970, Villegas and Estanislao had attended a private meeting with Opus Dei founder Msgr. Josemaría Escrivá, which inspired them to transform CRC into a university. This resulted in the CRC offering its first graduate program, the Masters in Industrial Economics. This was followed by the establishment of the CRC's College of Arts and Sciences in 1989, and the government recognition of the new University of Asia and the Pacific (UA&P) on June 26, 1995. Villegas became a professor at UA&P. However, he also remained part of the CRC, which had retained its identity as a think tank, where he now serves as research director.

Villegas has written seven books, including articles in Global Nation, several economics textbooks used in Philippine educational institutions, and books on management. He sits on the boards of a large number of Filipino and international corporations in several sectors and industries. He is also a consultant on management development and strategic planning.

== Awards ==
Villegas received awards including the Ten Outstanding Young Men (TOYM) 1972, Fulbright, Johnson Foundation, Asia Foundation and the Instituto de Cultura Hispanica.

== Written works ==
- "State of the Philippine Economy"
- "Strategic Guidelines to Investments in the Philippines"
- "Challenge in Asia"
- "The Philippine Economy after the May Elections"
- "The Outlook of Asia Economic Region"
- Economics and Society: Policy Perspectives for the 1990s, Sinag-Tala Publishers, 1989, ISBN 978-971-11-7074-5
- A Filipino's Vision for Recovery: Polevaulting to the Third Millennium, University of Asia and the Pacific Foundation, 1997, ISBN 978-971-8527-37-5
- Book of Values, University of Asia and the Pacific, 1998, ISBN 978-971-8527-40-5
- The Filipino Phenomenon, University of Asia and the Pacific Foundation, 1998, ISBN 978-971-8527-44-3
- The Philippines at the Threshold of the Third Millennium, University of Asia and the Pacific in cooperation with Philip Morris Philippines Inc., 2000, ISBN 978-971-8527-52-8
- The Philippine Advantage, University of Asia and the Pacific, 2001, ISBN 978-971-8527-55-9
