= Antonio Floirendo Sr. =

Filipino businessman known as Banana King and former crony of Ferdinand Marcos

- Born: November 20, 1915; Bauang, La Union, Philippine Islands
- Died: June 12, 2012 (aged 96); Quezon City, Philippines
- Known for: Founder and owner of Tagum Agricultural Development Company, Inc. (TADECO)
- Political party: Kilusang Bagong Lipunan
- Spouse: Nenita P. del Rosario
- Children: 6
- Relatives: Antonio Lagdameo Jr. (grandson)

Antonio Floirendo Sr. (November 20, 1915 – June 29, 2012) was a Filipino entrepreneur and landowner whose main business was his 6000-hectare banana plantation in Panabo, Davao del Norte, Philippines, earning him the title as the "banana king" during the dictatorship of Ferdinand Marcos. He was among a group of close associates of Philippine President Ferdinand Marcos referred to in media as "Marcos cronies", having benefitted from his close association with Marcos. The Marcos mansion at 2442 Makiki Heights Drive in Honolulu, Hawaii, in which Marcos spent the last years of his life in exile, was registered under the name of Floirendo Sr.

== Early life and family ==
Floirendo was born on November 20, 1915, in Bauang, La Union. He was in his 20s when World War II took place, and made a living through the war by ferrying passengers on his calesa (horse-drawn carriage). He married Nenita P. del Rosario, with whom he would have six children.

== Early career ==
After the war, Floirendo took up President Elpidio Quirino's call for people from Luzon and the Visayas to seek opportunities in Mindanao. In Davao, he put up Davao Motor Sales (DAMOSA), the first Ford dealership outside Manila.

In the 1950s, Quirino gave Floirendo his big break by issuing a proclamation that granted Floirendo the title to a total of 1,200 hectares of marshland in Davao del Norte. He founded Tagum Agricultural Development Company, Inc. (TADECO) and turned the land into an abaca (Musa textilis) plantation.

The abaca plantation was highly successful at first, but began to decline in the 1960s with the development of synthetic nylon ropes. Floirendo Sr. promptly shifted TADECO's focus from abaca to bananas.

== Association with Ferdinand Marcos ==
Antonio Floirendo Sr. became a close business associate of the Marcoses before Ferdinand Marcos became president, and was a major contributor to Marcos's 1965 and 1969 presidential campaigns. He also contributed to many of First Lady Imelda Marcos' projects, and was a regular part of Imelda's entourage.

He chaired the Davao regional chapter of Marcos's political party Kilusang Bagong Lipunan, through which he lobbied for appointments of local officials.

== TADECO during the Marcos dictatorship ==
During the Macapagal administration, TADECO leased 6,000 hectares of prime, fertile government land for use as a banana plantation. However, the project was halted because it violated the 1935 Constitution of the Philippines and Philippine corporate law, which permitted only up to 1,024 hectares of land acquisition. Senator Lorenzo Tañada chaired a Senate Blue Ribbon Committee investigation into the matter, which caused Floirendo to shelf the plan and wait for a more favorable political climate.

The plan was realized after Marcos' second term. Before Marcos declared Martial Law in the early 1970s, TADECO began exporting its bananas to the Japanese market, resulting in phenomenal growth for the company.

=== Hiring of prison laborers ===
Floirendo also hired prisoners from the Davao Penal Colony (Dapecol) as his laborers, providing them with opportunities to reform their lives and start earning a living and prepare for life after serving their prison terms.

== Overseas properties ==
Floirendo also served as a front for the Marcoses in purchasing international properties, a fact he acknowledged when he inked a compromise deal with the Philippines' Presidential Commission on Good Government after the Marcoses were ousted in 1986.

For former First Lady Imelda Marcos, he purchased three condominium apartments in Olympic Tower in New York City. He purchased two units at the St. James Towers in Manhattan. He purchased a $1.35 million mansion in Makiki Heights in Hawaii. He purchased the $4.5 million Lindenmere estate in Long Island New York, and a $2.5 million Beverly Hills property.

== 1986 escape to Brunei ==
The day before Ferdinand Marcos fell from power in 1986, Floirendo and his family fled from the Philippines to Brunei.

== Compromise deal with the Presidential Commission on Good Government ==
Antonio Floirendo Sr. signed a compromise deal with the Presidential Commission on Good Government (PCGG) in 1987, turning over about PHP70 million ($1.5 million) in cash and assets. This included the Lindenmere Estate and Olympic Tower in New York City; a property in Beverly Hills, California; and the mansion at 2443 Makiki Heights Drive, Honolulu, Hawaii, in which Marcos lived in exile.

== Death ==
Floirendo Sr. died of pneumonia on June 29, 2012, at the age of 96.

== Descendants ==
Floirendo Sr. had six children. His eldest, Maria Linda Floirendo Lagdameo, married Antonio M. Lagdameo. His second child Antonio "Tonyboy" Floirendo Jr., became representative for the 2nd congressional district of Davao del Norte. His grandson, Antonio Lagdameo Jr. (through his daughter Linda F. Lagdameo), also held the same post in between the terms of his uncle Tonyboy. He had four younger children, Maria Cristina (who married Antonio M. Brias), Maria Theresa, Ricardo and Vicente.

== See also ==
- Cronies of Ferdinand Marcos
- Monopolies in the Philippines (1965–1986)
- Ferdinand Marcos
- Imelda Marcos
