= Augusto Santos =

Director-General of the National Economic and Development Authority Concurrently Secretary of Socioeconomic Planning (Acting)
- In office August 19, 2009 – June 30, 2010
- President: Gloria Macapagal Arroyo
- Preceded by: Ralph Recto
- Succeeded by: Cayetano Paderanga, Jr.
- In office August 16, 2007 – July 23, 2008
- President: Gloria Macapagal Arroyo
- Preceded by: Romulo Neri
- Succeeded by: Ralph Recto
- In office July 14, 2005 – February 16, 2006
- President: Gloria Macapagal Arroyo
- Preceded by: Romulo Neri
- Succeeded by: Romulo Neri

Personal details
- Born: Manila
- Education: University of the Philippines
- Occupation: Economist

Augusto Santos is a Filipino career government official who served as acting Director-General of the National Economic and Development Authority from 2005 to 2006, 2007–2008 and 2009–2010. He was educated at the University of the Philippines.
