= Jose V. Romero Jr. =

Filipino statesman and diplomat (1934–2018)

Jose Emeterio Villanueva Romero Jr. (4 May 1934 – 10 September 2018), also known as Joe Romero or Jose V. Romero Jr., was a Filipino statesman and diplomat.

== Early life and education ==
Romero was born on May 4, 1934, to José E. Romero and Elisa Zuñiga Villanueva. His father was the first Philippine ambassador to the Court of St. James's, while his brother Eddie Romero was a National Artist of the Philippines for cinema.

Romero's father was the son of Francisco Romero Sr., mayor of Tanjay, Negros Oriental from 1909 to 1916 and later a member of the Provincial Board of Negros Oriental, and Josefa Calumpang Muñoz, daughter of Tanjay gobernadorcillo Don José Teves Muñoz and Doña Aleja Ines Calumpang, a great-granddaughter of Don Fernando Velaz de Medrano Bracamonte y Dávila (es), Marquis of Tabuérniga de Velazar (es), 15th Marquis of Cañete (GE) (es), 6th Marquis of Fuente el Sol (es), 8th Marquis of Navamorcuende (es), 15th Lord of Montalbo, and Knight of the Order of St. John.

Romero was formerly married to Carmelita Beatriz Espina Corominas of Cebu and had three children. She is the niece of Anita Corominas-Guerrero, wife of León María Guerrero III who succeeded José E. Romero as Philippine ambassador to the Court of St. James's.

Romero obtained his bachelor's and master's degrees in history and economics from Trinity College, Cambridge. He did postgraduate work in economics at Georgetown University and obtained a doctorate degree in development management from the University of Asia and the Pacific.

== Professional career ==
Upon Romero's return from his studies at Cambridge, he worked as an economist at the Department of Economic Research of the Central Bank of the Philippines. He was later the director-general of the Congressional Economic Planning Office of the Philippine House of Representatives during the speakerships of José Laurel Jr. and Cornelio Villareal. He was executive director of the United Coconut Authority of the Philippines in the mid-1960s and served as president of the Philippine Economic Society from 1971 to 1972.

In 1981, Romero co-founded the Makati Business Club together with Enrique Zobel, Rogelio Pantaleon and Bernardo Villegas.

During the presidency of Corazon Aquino, Romero served simultaneously as chairman of the Philippine Coconut Authority and undersecretary of the Department of Agriculture. He later served as board member of United Coconut Planters Bank and president of the Coconut Investment Fund Management Company.

Romero was later appointed Philippine ambassador extraordinary and plenipotentiary to Italy. While chief of mission to Rome, he was also the executive director of the Common Fund for Commodities and permanent representative to the Food and Agriculture Organization and the International Fund for Agricultural Development.

Romero served as a professorial lecturer and long-time trustee of the University of Asia and the Pacific and the Asian Institute of Journalism and Communication. He also lectured at various times at the Ateneo de Manila University, the Asian Social Institute, St. Paul University Dumaguete and Silliman University.

As a writer and scholar, he authored three books on Philippine political economy and the coconut industry: Philippine Political Economy, Postwar Political Economy: 1946-1965, and Transforming the Coconut Industry: Institutional and Policy Reforms Toward Shared Development. He was also a business columnist and publisher. He was formerly the business editor and assistant publisher of the Manila Bulletin and contributed to the Financial Times and The Manila Times.

Romero was president of the Philippine Ambassadors Foundation, Inc., an association of active and retired diplomats in the Philippines. At the time of his death in 2018, he was chairman of the Philippine Council for Foreign Relations.

== Death ==
Romero died, at 84, on 10 September 2018 in Baltimore, Maryland while visiting family.
