= NBN–ZTE deal corruption scandal =

Corruption scandal

The Philippine National Broadband Network controversy (also referred to as the NBN–ZTE deal or NBN–ZTE mess) involved allegations of corruption in the awarding of a US$329 million construction contract to Chinese telecommunications firm ZTE for the proposed government-managed National Broadband Network (NBN).

The contract with ZTE was signed on April 20, 2007, in Hainan, China. Following the emergence of irregularities, President Gloria Macapagal Arroyo cancelled the National Broadband Network project in October 2007. On July 14, 2008, the Supreme Court dismissed all three petitions questioning the constitutionality of the national broadband deal, saying the petitions became moot when the project was cancelled.

== History ==
=== Background ===
In April 2007, Philippine Department of Transportation and Communications (DOTC) Secretary Leandro Mendoza and ZTE Vice President Yu Yong entered into a US$329.5 million contract for a National Broadband Network (NBN) that would improve government communications capabilities.

On August 29, Nueva Vizcaya Congressman Carlos Padilla hinted in a privilege speech that Commission on Elections (COMELEC) Chairman Benjamin Abalos went to China to broker a deal for the NBN project. The following day, Abalos denied brokering for the NBN project, although he did admit going to China four times.

On September 5, Senator Aquilino Pimentel called for a Senate investigation about the NBN project. As a result, three committees held joint hearings about the issue: the Accountability of Public Officers & Investigations (aka the Blue Ribbon Committee) headed by Alan Peter Cayetano, the National Defense and Security committee headed by Rodolfo Biazon and the Trade and Commerce committee headed by Mar Roxas.

=== Senate investigations ===
==== De Venecia's testimony ====
Jose "Joey" de Venecia III, son of House Speaker Jose de Venecia, Jr., testified on September 10 that he was with Abalos in China and that he heard Abalos "demand money" from ZTE officials. The younger de Venecia was president of Amsterdam Holdings, the company that lost its bid to ZTE for the NBN project.

On September 11, the Supreme Court of the Philippines promulgated a temporary restraining order (TRO) on the $329-million national broadband network (NBN) contract between the Philippine government and China's ZTE based on separate certiorari suits filed by Iloilo Vice-Governor and former Representative Rolex Suplico and Joey de Venecia III. Under political pressure from the opposition group, the court gave ZTE fifteen days to comment on the injunction. Suplico, a former opposition congressman, alleged that the agreement was sealed without public bidding and violated the Telecoms Policy Act, which required privatization of all telecommunications facilities. Congressman Padilla sued DOTC and ZTE officials for violating the Anti-Graft and Corrupt Practices Act, the Telecommunications Policy Act, the Build-Operate-Transfer (BOT) Act and the Government Procurement Act at the Office of the Ombudsman. AHI also petitioned the Court to direct the DOTC to provide copies of the contract, since it should have won the same. The younger de Venecia testified on September 18 that Mike Arroyo, President Gloria Macapagal Arroyo's husband, personally told him to "back off" from pursuing the NBN project.

==== Neri's testimony ====
On the September 20 Senate hearing, Cabinet officials attended the hearing except for former National Economic and Development Authority (NEDA) Chairman (now Commission on Higher Education Chairman) Romulo Neri, who was sick. On September 22, 2007, president Arroyo suspended the broadband contract with ZTE after the bribery scandal sparked major problems in her government.

Neri and Abalos finally faced each other on the September 26 Senate hearing; Neri testified that Abalos told him "Sec, may 200 ka dito (You have 200 million pesos in this deal)" while playing golf at Wack Wack Golf Club; they had been discussing the ZTE deal at that time. Abalos denied making the apparent bribe attempt. Neri later invoked executive privilege in response to some Senators' questions. He later shunned succeeding Senate hearings still citing executive privilege.

On September 27, 2007, ZTE petitioned the Supreme Court to lift the TRO alleging, in its urgent omnibus motion, inter alia, that the injunction cost the company millions.

Abalos announced his resignation as COMELEC chair on October 1; Resurreccion Borra succeeded him as COMELEC chairman. President Arroyo on her October 2 trip to China, said to Chinese President and General Secretary of the Communist Party Hu Jintao her "difficult decision" to cancel ZTE Corp.'s contract for the NBN project.

On May 26, 2008, a Supreme Court decision (Neri vs. Senate) nullified the citation of contempt against Neri, ruling that conversations between Neri and President Arroyo are considered classified information.

==== Lozada's kidnapping and testimony ====
On January 30, 2008, the Senate produced warrants of arrest to Neri and Rodolfo "Jun" Lozada, Jr., former chief executive officer of the government-run Philippine Forest Corporation and a consultant of the NEDA. Neri then went into hiding while Lozada skipped the Senate hearing and went to Hong Kong. Meanwhile, House Speaker de Venecia lost a motion of confidence vote on February 5, which unseated him as House Speaker; his partymate at Lakas–CMD, Prospero Nograles of Davao City, succeeded him as speaker.

On February 5, as the Senate arresting team waited at Ninoy Aquino International Airport (NAIA) during Lozada's arrival, Lozada was taken by unidentified people "out of town" and Lozada's kin appealed for help on his whereabouts. On February 7, Lozada finally surfaced as police took him to La Salle Green Hills, Mandaluyong. Lozada linked Mike Arroyo and Abalos to the ZTE scandal. On the same day, the Supreme Court stopped the Senate from arresting Neri, ordering a status quo; Neri then resurfaced after the threat of arrest was taken off.

The next day, on a Philippine Senate hearing, Lozada confirmed his NEDA boss Romulo Neri's testimony that Commission on Elections (COMELEC) chairman Benjamin Abalos and Arroyo's husband Mike Arroyo were behind the kickbacks in the deal. Lozada's statement was made after he was "abducted" on the orders of Department of Environment and Natural Resources (DENR) secretary Lito Atienza, Neri, former Presidential Management Staff head Michael Defensor, Secretary for Special Concerns Remedios Poblador and Deputy Executive Secretary Manuel Gaite.

On February 11, upon continuation of Senate hearings, the government denied on kidnapping Lozada. Lozada claimed he was driven around Metro Manila and even reached Los Baños, Laguna, before he was transported to the La Salle Green Hills seminary. According to DENR Secretary Atienza, Lozada, who is his boss as the Philippine Forest Corp. is under the DENR, asked for his help as "he feared for his life" as he returned from Hong Kong. Joey de Venecia later claimed that ZTE advanced US$1 million to Abalos; senators pointed out that this qualifies as "plunder" under Philippine criminal law since the advance was given when the foreign exchange was at about PHP 50 to $1, thus equaling the PHP 50 million floor for plunder.

Deputy Executive Secretary Manuel Gaite appeared on the February 26 hearing. He had previously said that the P500,000 he gave to Lozada's brother was for Lozada's expenses while staying at Hong Kong. Gaite said he "can't rationally justify" the reason why he gave Lozada the hefty amount. He said that his action "was moved by my conscience and my faith." Lozada earlier claimed that the P500,000 was a bribe.

The Philippine Court of Appeals dismissed Jun Lozada's writ of amparo petition for lack of evidence on his claim that there were threats to his life and security. On September 23, 2008, Lozada asked the Supreme Court of the Philippines to re-open and reconsider his case, thereby arguing for the protection of his siblings, Violeta and Arturo.

On August 23, 2016, the Sandiganbayan anti-graft court found Lozada and his brother guilty of graft in connection to the Philippine Forest Corp, and were sentenced to six to 10 years of imprisonment.

===== Countersuit =====
Mike Defensor, on July 4, 2008, filed a 6-page perjury lawsuit Friday versus Rodolfo Noel Lozada for "testifying under oath that he had paid Lozada P 50,000 to change his statement that he was not kidnapped at Ninoy Aquino International Airport (NAIA) when he arrived from Hong Kong at the height of the Philippine National Broadband Network controversy (ZTE Zhong Xing Telecommunication Equipment Company Limited scandal)."

==== Madriaga testimony ====
Also on the February 26 hearing, Dante Madriaga, a ZTE-employed engineer, claimed that US$41 million was sought as "advances". ZTE then withheld more money, saying they needed to see President Arroyo's face at the signing of the contract.

=== Ombudsman cases ===
The Ombudsman Merceditas Gutierrez subpoenaed First Gentleman Mike Arroyo, Neri, the de Venecias and Abalos to hear their side of the story. The case was filed by former vice president Teofisto Guingona Jr., several lawyers, Fr. Joe Dizon and party-list representatives Joel Villanueva and Risa Hontiveros, among others.

The Office of the Ombudsman indicted Gloria Macapagal Arroyo, Jose Miguel Arroyo, Abalos, and former Transportation Secretary Leandro Mendoza for graft concerning alleged unlawful intervention in the ZTE national broadband project on December 28, 2011. Ombudsman Conchita Carpio Morales affirmed the indictment in March 2012. Party-list representatives Neri Colmenares and Walden Bello called for a banning of ZTE operations in the country until its record in the scandal had been clarified.

In 2013, the Court of Appeals affirmed an earlier Ombudsman decision declaring former Socioeconomic Planning Secretary Romulo Neri guilty of simple misconduct and ordered his suspension for six months.

The Sandiganbayan dismissed graft charges against Gloria Macapagal Arroyo and her co-accused in September 2016.

=== Judgment ===
President Arroyo decided to cancel the National Broadband Network project on October 2, 2007, in a meeting with Chinese leader Hu Jintao. On July 14, 2008, the Supreme Court dismissed all three petitions questioning the constitutionality of the national broadband deal, saying the petitions became moot when President Arroyo decided to cancel the project.

In November 2021, the Supreme Court of the Philippines convicted Romulo Neri for grave misconduct for his handling of the NBN-ZTE scandal. The ruling ordered Neri's removal and perpetual disqualification from public office. The Supreme Court decision reversed the Court of Appeals finding him guilty of simple misconduct, stating the presence of "elements of corruption and clear intent to violate the law".

== Reactions ==
Following the testimony of Jun Lozada, several sectors and prominent people such as Joey de Venecia and Senator Panfilo Lacson called for President Arroyo's resignation, while Senate President Manuel Villar and Senator Alan Peter Cayetano called for her to take a leave of absence. Vice President Noli de Castro said that President Arroyo and other government officials "should be charged" if they would be found directly involved in the alleged anomalies.

The Catholic Bishops' Conference of the Philippines called an emergency meeting on February 25, 2008, wherein they formed a collective stance which refused to call for Arroyo's resignation, instead calling on her to be part of a "moral reform process".

On February 29, 2008, a rally was held in the Makati Central Business District to protest corruption and call for the resignation of President Arroyo. The rally's attendees, which included former Presidents Corazon Aquino and Joseph Estrada, were estimated by police and rally organizers to be around 15,000 people.

== See also ==
- Neri vs. Senate
