= Philippine Communications Satellite Corporation =

- Industry: Telecommunications
- Headquarters: Makati, Metro Manila, Philippines
- Key people: Finance Usec Bayani Agabin (Director/Gov't Representative); Santiago Ranada, Jr. (Chairman); Lin Bildner (President/CEO); Katrina Ponce Enrile (Director/CFO)
- Services: Satellite service provider
- Parent: Philippine Overseas Telecommunications Corporation
- Subsidiaries: Philcomsat Holdings Corp.
- Website: www.philcomsat.com.ph

Philippine Communications Satellite Corporation (PHILCOMSAT) is a telecommunications company based in Makati, Metro Manila, Philippines. Its main teleport is in the province of Rizal.

== History ==
PHILCOMSAT was formed as a joint venture between the government of the Philippines under the administration of then President Ferdinand Marcos and the Philippine Overseas Telecommunications Corporation (POTC), a firm established by businessman Potenciano Ilusorio and then Defense secretary Juan Ponce Enrile.

On May 2, 1968, the company, as the Philippines’ signatory to Intelsat and Inmarsat, formally inaugurated a permanent earth station in Baras, Rizal. This linked the country to a worldwide communications satellite network. On June 21, 1969, the company was given a franchise through Republic Act No. 5514 to operate grounds stations and other facilities for international satellite communications. It was also granted tax exemptions under the same law. Under Republic Act No. 11226 signed into law on February 22, 2019, Philcomsat's telecommunications mega-franchise was extended until 2044.

Philcomsat became the major supplier of international circuits for telecommunications firms in the country such as the Philippine Long Distance Telephone Company (PLDT) and other carriers.

In 1982, the government sold its stake to POTC, making POTC the sole owner of Philcomsat. In a prominent example of what Finance Minister Jaime Ongpin later branded "crony capitalism", the Marcos administration sold its majority shares to Marcos cronies such as Roberto Benedicto in 1982, despite being very profitable because of its role as the sole agent for the Philippines' link to global satellite network Intelsat. President Marcos acquired a 39.9% share in the company through front companies under Jose Yao Campos and Rolando Gapud. This allowed him to appoint his son Bongbong Marcos as the chair of the Philcomsat board in early 1985, allowing Bongbong Marcos to draw a monthly salary "ranging from US$9,700 to US$97,000" despite rarely visiting the office and having no duties there.

After the People Power Revolution of 1986, the Presidential Commission on Good Government (PCGG) of then President Corazon Aquino sequestered Philcomsat and POTC. This allowed the Aquino administration and subsequent governments to install their nominees in the board of directors of Philcomsat and POTC, none of whom were experts in the field of telecommunication. This led to the decline in the business of both companies. After an extensive investigation by the Philippine Senate in 2006-2007, it was found that the PCGG nominees plundered and decimated the two companies. In 2016, the Supreme Court ruled that the two companies had been wrongly sequestered since 1987.

Since 2000, the Republic of the Philippines has owned 35% of POTC, while a group of private shareholders, notably the Ponce-Enrile and Ilusorio families, own the balance.

Currently managed by the scions of POTC’s founders, Lin I. Bildner and Katrina Ponce-Enrile, Philcomsat was able to recover some of the funds dissipated by the former boards of directors and management and to rebuild its telecommunications business. Philcomsat currently provides satellite communication services for the Philippine government and, in partnership with Australian satellite services supplier Speedcast International, is a major installer for and provider of President Rodrigo Duterte's "Free Wi-Fi For All” project administered jointly by the United Nations Development Programme and the Department of Information and Communication Technology (DICT).
