= Magtanggol C. Gunigundo =

Filipino government official and politician

Magtanggol C. Gunigundo is a Filipino government official and politician best known for having been the sole chair of the Presidential Commission on Good Government (PCGG) during the term of President Fidel V. Ramos, and as the father of former Valenzuela Congressman Magtanggol T. Gunigundo. His term at the PCGG is noted for an attempted compromise deal with Imelda Marcos in 1993 for the partial return of the Marcoses' wealth, although the deal ultimately did not push through.

== See also ==
- Presidential Commission on Good Government
- Martial law under Ferdinand Marcos
- Marcos cronies
