= Asian Business Case Competition @ Nanyang =

Undergraduate business case competition in Singapore

Asian Business Case Competition @ Nanyang is an international undergraduate business case competition in Singapore, established in 2007. It is organised by Nanyang Business School’s case club Business Solutions and is backed by the Asian Business Case Centre. ABCC @ Nanyang is a student-led case competition with a focus on sustainability. Every year, the competition hosts undergraduate participants from business schools around the world, applying their knowledge and skills to solve real-life business problems. ABCC @ Nanyang has been certified carbon neutral by TheCarbonNeutral Company.

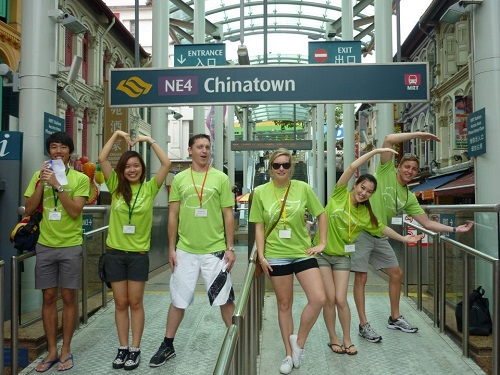
ABCC 2011 Xperience Singapore

== Activities ==
=== Case competition ===
The competition centres around a 40-hour-long case, where students would strategize their best solution to a business case study, and present their case to a panel of judges. In 2017, after one successful decade of hosting Asian Business Case Competition, the format of competition was changed to include one 8-hour case, and one 24-hour case to provide an enhanced competition experience.

=== History ===
The competition was first established in 2008, steadily growing into one of Asia's largest business case competitions, having gathered students from North America, Europe, Australia, and Asia over the years. It is currently the oldest and longest-running international business case competition based in Singapore. Since its inception, it has featured participants from numerous universities all over the world including the National University of Singapore, Nanyang Technological University, the University of Toronto, the University of New South Wales, the University of Oxford, the University of Cambridge, and the University of Southern California.

==== Past Champions ====
Year	Champion	First Runner-Up	Second Runner-Up
2023	Chinese University of Hong Kong	University of Sydney	University of New South Wales
2022	University of the Philippines Diliman	University of Hong Kong	Corvinus University of Budapest
2021	University of Asia and the Pacific	National University of Singapore Singapore Management University University of Oxford University of Cambridge	University of Belgrade
2020	The competition was temporarily paused during 2019 and 2020		
2019	The competition was temporarily paused during 2019 and 2020		
2018	University of Toronto	Nanyang Technological University	University of Hong Kong
2017	University of Alberta	University of New South Wales	Chulalongkorn University
2016	University of Alberta	University of Hong Kong	Queen's University
2015	Nanyang Business School, Nanyang Technological University	University of Alberta	Shantou University
2014	University of New South Wales	University of Otago	Shantou University
2013	Chulalongkorn University	Queensland University of Technology	University of Alberta
2012	University of Porto	Nanyang Technological University	Queensland University of Technology
2011	Queensland University of Technology	University of Florida	Auckland University of Technology
2010	Maastricht University	Auckland University of Technology	Nanyang Technological University
2009	University of Southern California	Nanyang Technological University	McGill University
2008	University of Southern California	McGill University Thammasat University University of Auckland	

=== Sustainability initiatives ===
ABCC @ Nanyang has adopted and adhered to several sustainability practices. Besides sourcing for environmentally-friendly materials for use during the competition where possible, ABCC @ Nanyang also purchases carbon credits and is carbon-neutral certified.

A one-day event during ABCC is dedicated to sustainability each year. It has taken different forms in the past few years including panel discussions and mini-case presentations, revolving around sustainability. Some of the highlights include the sustainability roundtable event in 2010, where participants were split into different groups to hold a discussion based on the central theme of “Profitable Shade of Green”. Other formats include 2011's event, which took the form of a mini-case, where teams were challenged to come up with a strategic plan for sustainable growth in the Small-Medium Enterprise (SME) context, with a focus on engaging fresh graduate talent.

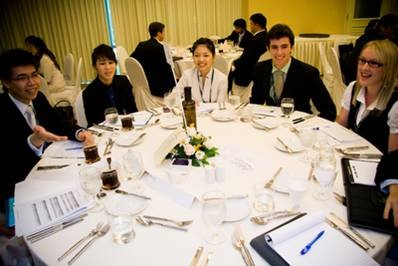
ABCC Sustainability Roundtable

=== Organisers ===
The competition is organized by students from Nanyang Business School's case club, Business Solutions. Nanyang Business School is part of Nanyang Technological University, based in Singapore. Besides ABCC @ Nanyang, Business Solution also organises the Singapore Business Case Competition, a case competition targeted at students from the local tertiary institutions in Singapore.
