= Romulo Neri =

Filipino educator and public servant

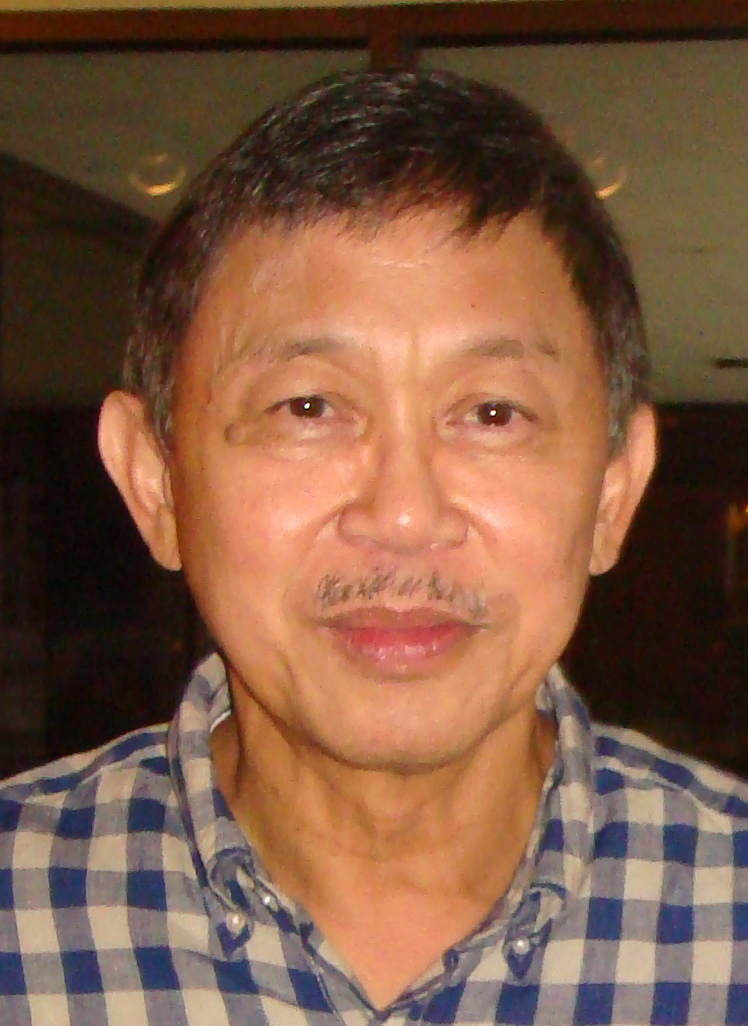
- Neri in August 2012

11th Director-General of the National Economic and Development Authority Concurrently Secretary of Socioeconomic Planning
- In office February 16, 2006 – August 16, 2007
- President: Gloria Macapagal Arroyo
- Preceded by: Augusto Santos (acting)
- Succeeded by: Augusto Santos (acting)
- In office December 13, 2002 – July 14, 2005
- President: Gloria Macapagal Arroyo
- Preceded by: Dante Canlas
- Succeeded by: Augusto Santos (acting)

Secretary of Budget and Management
- In office July 19, 2005 – February 5, 2006
- President: Gloria Macapagal Arroyo
- Preceded by: Mario Relampagos (OIC)
- Succeeded by: Rolando Andaya Jr.

Chairperson of the Philippine Commission on Higher Education
- In office 2007–2008
- President: Gloria Macapagal Arroyo
- Preceded by: Carlito Puno Jr.
- Succeeded by: Emmanuel Angeles

Personal details
- Born: February 1, 1950 (age 76)
- Education: University of California, Los Angeles; University of the Philippines Diliman
- Occupation: Economist, NEDA Director General

Romulo Neri (born 1 February 1950) is a Filipino educator and public servant. He held several high-ranking government positions such as Secretary of Socio-Economic Planning and concurrently Director-General of the National Economic and Development Authority (NEDA), acting Secretary of Department of Budget and Management (DBM), Chairperson of the Commission on Higher Education and President of Social Security System under former President Gloria Arroyo. He is also involved in the controversial NBN–ZTE scandal involving corruption in the Philippine National Broadband Network project.

== Background ==
Neri was born on February 1, 1950, currently residing at #28 Palali, Sta. Mesa Heights in Quezon City. He finished his B.S. in business administration (magna cum laude and class valedictorian), major in marketing, from the University of the Philippines Diliman in 1970. Neri pursued his Master of Business Administration (MBA) degree from the University of California, Los Angeles (UCLA), majoring in finance and international management from 1977 to 1979. He attended secondary school at Ateneo de Manila High School from 1962 to 1966.

== Academic career ==
Neri is an associate professor, teaching corporate financial management, at the Asian Institute of Management and previously had held an instructor position from 1970 to 1971 at the University of the Philippines College of Business Administration, teaching basic management and marketing.

== Government service ==
The former NEDA chief joined the government as a planning coordinator at the Philippine National Oil Company. He then rose through the ranks and eventually became director of the Congressional Budget and Planning Office under the Philippine House of Representatives where he provided advice to the leadership of the House on socio-economic issues, particularly on fiscal and monetary policies, development financing, and the budget of the national government.

On 12 November 2021, the Supreme Court of the Philippines convicted him guilty of grave misconduct for his handling of the ZTE scandal by perpetual disqualification from holding public office.
