= Makati Business Club =

Filipino business association

- Type: Business association
- Headquarters: Makati, Metro Manila, Philippines
- Chairman: Edgar O. Chua
- Website: mbc.com.ph

The Makati Business Club is a private non-profit business association in the Philippines founded in 1981 to promote the role of the business sector in national development efforts. Counting senior executives from some of the Philippines' largest corporations among its members, it pursues its objectives through four main lines of activity: policy advocacy, information services and publishing, investment promotion, and corporate citizenship.

It has played a key role in Philippine history, notably playing a key role in galvanizing the mainstream resistance against the Marcos Dictatorship and the Marcos family's later return to power.

It backed the Second EDSA Revolution which ousted president Joseph Estrada and supported the succeeding administration of president Gloria Macapagal Arroyo. The association withdrew its support from the Arroyo administration in 2005 following the Hello Garci scandal.

MBC has lobbied for the easing of the economic restriction provisions enshrined in the 1986 Constitution of the Philippines.

== See also ==
- Makati Central Business District
- Bantayog ng mga Bayani
- Bernardo Villegas
- Alfonso Yuchengco
- Enrique Zobel
