= Case Solvers =

Hungarian company

Case Solvers is a company founded in September 2012 by Zsolt Ábrahám, Gergely Balázs and István Juhász. Case Solvers' is company specialises in training young problem solvers, and creating a platform between graduates and the actors of the Labor Market. The company was originally called Hungarian Business Case Society until 2013. The team of 35 Hungarians had held more than 250 training sessions with university students across 27 countries by 2017.

== History ==
Case Solvers was initially founded as the Hungarian Business Case Society. The organization originally functioned as a blog where professional articles about case solving were published continually. The page, case-study.hu, was erected in order to spread case-solving as a teaching method among Hungarian and international business students as well.

HBCS held its first training at the College of Management (Hungary) in March 2013, which was soon followed by several case interview trainings. The team organized its first case study camp, the Case Camp, in August 2013. Within a year, Case Solvers held training courses in its home country's most prestigious business universities and prepared top teams for national and international case study competitions.

HBCS held its first training course as Case Solvers in November 2013, in India. The first training was soon followed by another in Romania, then another in the Netherlands. By 2017, Case Solvers held more than 250 trainings in 27 countries.

== High school programs ==
In December 2013, Case Solvers co-founded the National Secondary School Problem Solving Contest (Országos Középiskolai Problémamegoldó Verseny) with Mathias Corvinus Collegium, and they launched the “Where to continue my studies?” (Hol tanuljak tovább?, HTT) initiative in November 2014. To support these projects, Problema Solvenda Foundation was established in January 2016 with the purpose of educating Hungarian high school students.

=== HTT program ===
HTT is a non-profit project of Case Solvers that helps secondary school students make thoughtful decisions about their further studies. On the program's website, people with different fields of education and profession talk about their everyday working lives, bringing it closer to graduating students.

=== OKPV – National Secondary School Problem Solving Contest ===
OKPV is a program for high school students that gives them an insight into the world of future academic case competitions. The task is problem solving of course, but the participants have to take on a historical figure’s character and make decisions with their minds. OKPV in 2017 is currently the fourth competition in a row in cooperation with Mathias Corvinus Collegium. With additional help from the Problema Solvenda Foundation, the competition is held in Slovenia, Romania and Ukraine as well.
