= APEX Business-IT Global Case Challenge =

Annual case competition in Singapore

APEX Business-IT Global Case Challenge is an annual case competition held in Singapore that highlights the intertwined nature of business and information technology (IT). The competition is organised by the School of Information Systems (SIS) at Singapore Management University (SMU). It attracts third or fourth year participants from more than 20 universities around the world.

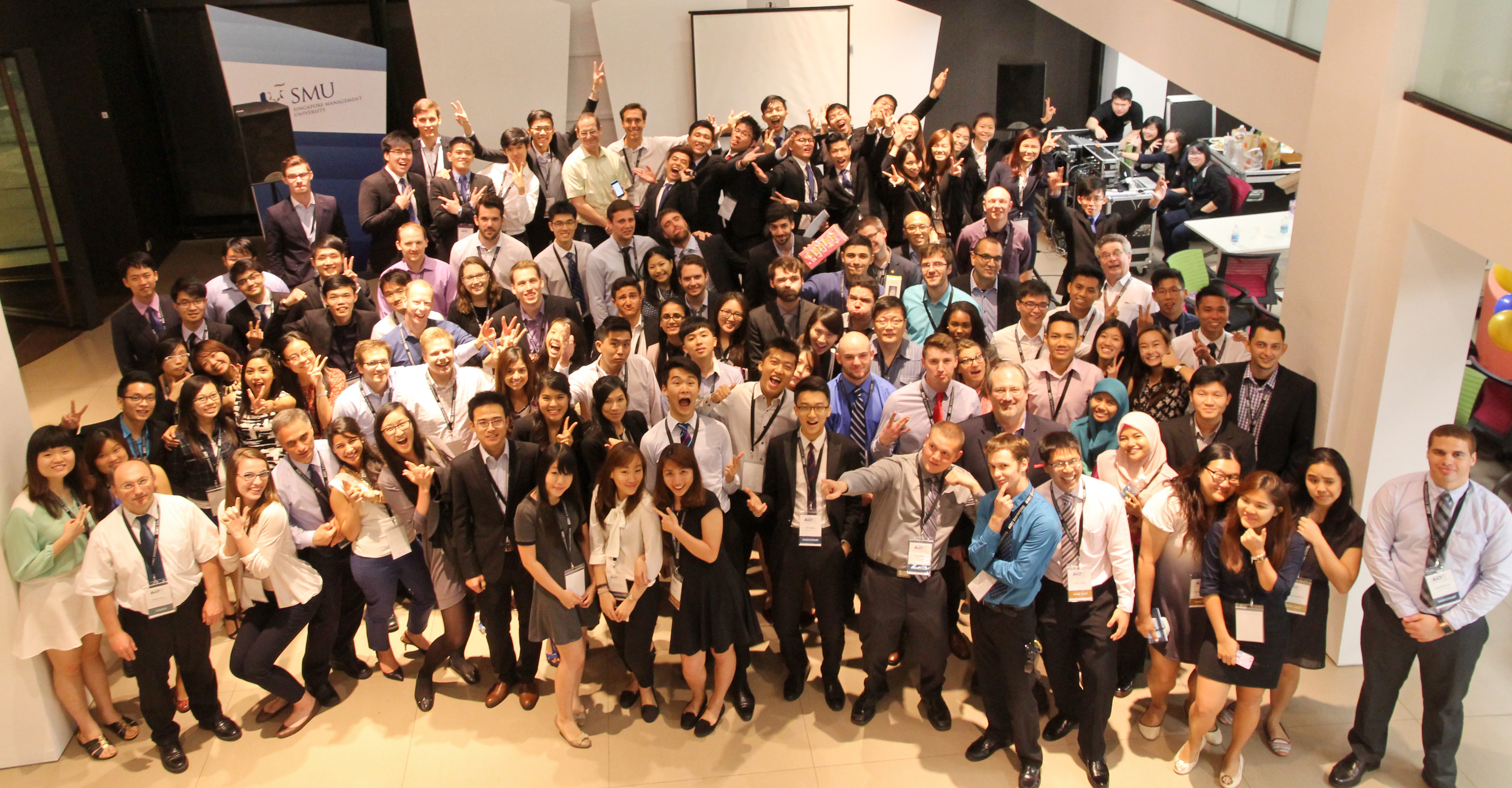
APEX Business-IT 2015 Welcome Dinner

The APEX Business-IT Global Case Challenge is an annual event held in May which typically lasts for 4 or 5 days. Each year, the competition features a unique, “live” case which highlights genuine challenges that businesses face. Participating teams compete in a 24-hour deliberation to develop and present integrated solutions that use IT to address these challenges and meet business needs. As part of the competition, participants also partake in a topical workshop held by industry experts. The event includes social activities and business networking sessions as well.

The APEX Business-IT Global Case Challenge has traditionally enjoyed strong support from external partners through sponsorships, having company representatives as part of the judging and workshop panels. Prominent partners in previous editions include Microsoft, IBM, Citibank, Credit Suisse, Barclays and Deloitte.

APEX Business-IT Global Case Challenge 2016 took place from 3 to 6 May 2016.

== History ==
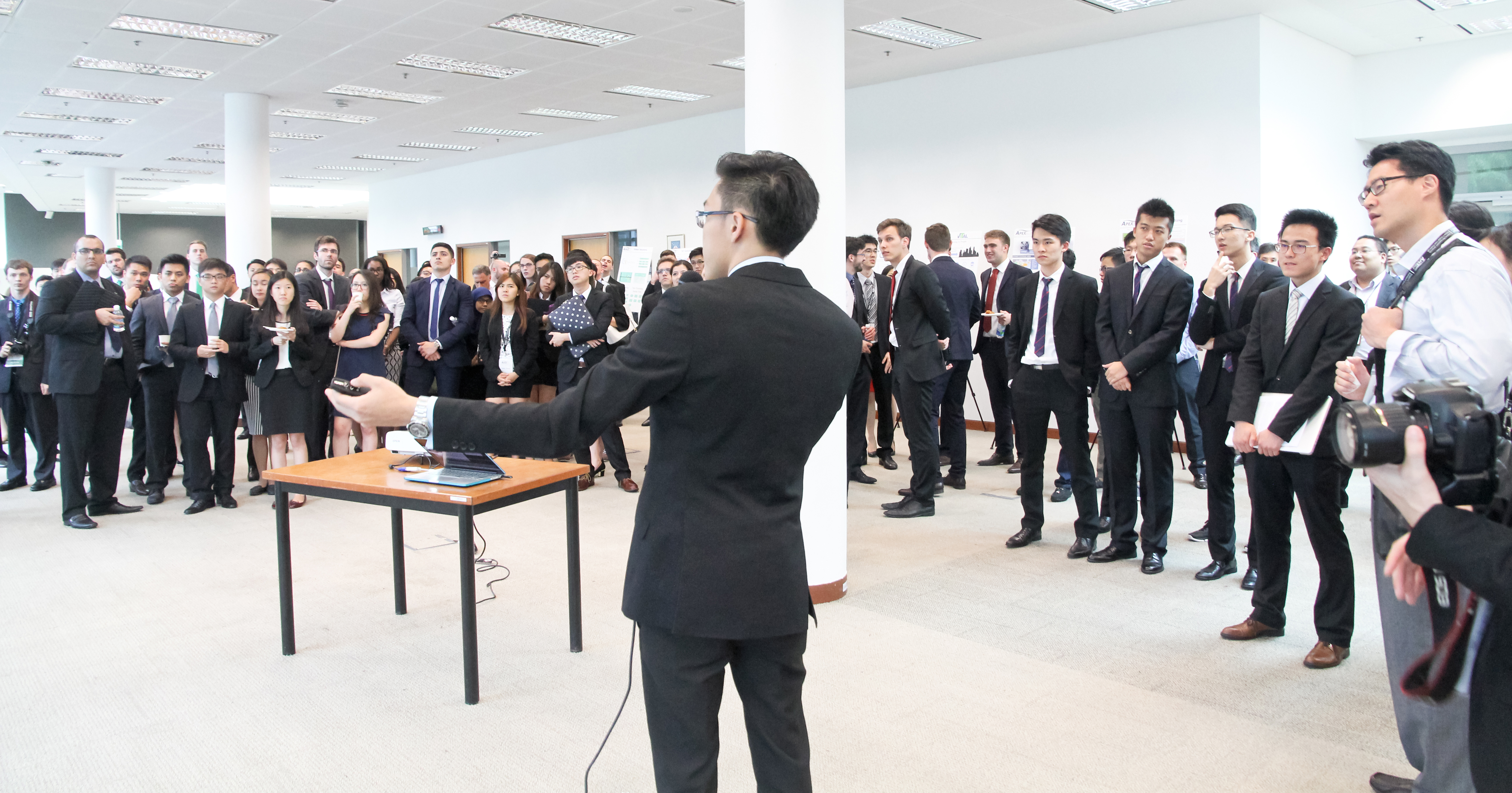
Release of results at APEX Business-IT Global Case Challenge 2015

| Year | Participating Universities | Awards |
|---|---|---|
| 2016 | Bandung Institute of Technology Bina Nusantara University Corvinus University of Budapest HEC Montréal Hong Kong Polytechnic University Hong Kong University of Science and Technology Kwantlen Polytechnic University Mahidol University International College Quest International University Perak Simon Fraser University Singapore University of Technology and Design Technical University of Dortmund University of British Columbia University of Indonesia University of Minnesota Zhejiang University | 1st: Simon Fraser University (Canada) 2nd: University of Minnesota (United States) 3rd: Bandung Institute of Technology (Indonesia) Plate Competition Winner: Kwantlen Polytechnic University (Canada) Honorable Mention: Corvinus University of Budapest (Hungary), Hong Kong Polytechnic University (Hong Kong) |
| 2015 | Ball State University Bina Nusantara University Corvinus University of Budapest HEC Montréal Hong Kong Polytechnic University Hong Kong University of Science and Technology Kwantlen Polytechnic University Mahidol University International College National University of Singapore Simon Fraser University Technical University of Dortmund Universitas Indonesia University of Alberta University of British Columbia University of Hong Kong University of Minnesota | 1st: University of Minnesota (United States) 2nd: University of British Columbia (Canada) 3rd: Simon Fraser University (Canada) Honorable Mention: University of British Columbia (Canada), The Hong Kong University of Science and Technology (Hong Kong) |
| 2014 | Ateneo de Manila University Bina Nusantara University Colorado State University Corvinus University of Budapest East China Normal University HEC Montreal Kwantlen Polytechnic University Mahidol University International College National University of Singapore Seoul National University Shantou University Simon Fraser University Singapore Management University Technical University of Munich The Hong Kong University of Science and Technology The University of Hong Kong Universitas Indonesia Universiti Teknologi PETRONAS University of Alberta University of British Columbia University of Minnesota (Carlson School of Management) University of Technology Dortmund | 1st: Singapore Management University (Singapore) 2nd: The Hong Kong University of Science and Technology (Hong Kong) 3rd: The University of Hong Kong (Hong Kong) Honorable Mention: Kwantlen Polytechnic University |
| 2013 | Ateneo de Manila University Bina Nusantara University Carnegie Mellon University Qatar Copenhagen Business School Corvinus University of Budapest East China Normal University HEC Montréal Kwantlen Polytechnic University Mahidol University International College Seoul National University Shantou University Business School Simon Fraser University Singapore Management University The Hong Kong University of Science and Technology The University of Hong Kong Tsinghua University TU Dortmund Universitas Gadjah Mada Universiti Teknologi Petronas University of British Columbia University of Manitoba University of Minnesota Carlson School of Management University of South Australia Zhejiang University | 1st: University of British Columbia (Canada) 2nd: Simon Fraser University (Canada) 3rd: University of Minnesota, Carlson School of Management (USA) |
| 2012 | Bina Nusantara University Carnegie Mellon University City University of Hong Kong Copenhagen Business School Corvinus University of Budapest East China Normal University HEC Montréal Kwantlen Polytechnic University Mahidol University Shantou University Simon Fraser University Singapore Management University The Hong Kong University of Science and Technology The University of Hong Kong Tsinghua University Universitas Gadjah Mada Universitas Indonesia University of British Columbia University of Minnesota | 1st: Kwantlen Polytechnic University (Canada) 2nd: Bina Nusantara University (Indonesia) 3rd: Simon Fraser University (Canada) |
| 2011 | Aarhus School of Business Ateneo de Manila University Bina Nusantara University City University of Hong Kong Copenhagen Business School Corvinus University of Budapest East China Normal University HEC Montréal Institut Teknologi Bandung Kwantlen Polytechnic University Mahidol University Queensland University of Technology Simon Fraser University Singapore Management University Stellenbosch University Texas A and M University The Hong Kong University of Science and Technology The University of Hong Kong Tsinghua University TU Dortmund Universitas Gadjah Mada Universitas Indonesia Universite Laval University College London University of British Columbia University of Florida University of Manitoba University of Minnesota | 1st: The University of Hong Kong (Hong Kong) 2nd: Copenhagen Business School (Denmark) 3rd: Universitas Gadjah Mada (Indonesia) |
| 2010 | Aarhus School of Business Auckland University of Technology Bina Nusantara University Brigham Young University City University of Hong Kong Copenhagen Business School East China Normal University German University in Cairo (GUC) Indiana University Kwantlen Polytechnic University Mahidol University Queensland University of Technology Simon Fraser University Singapore Management University Stellenbosch University Texas A and M University The Hong Kong University of Science and Technology The University of Hong Kong TU Dortmund Universitas Gadjah Mada University of British Columbia University of Minnesota University of South Australia University of Navarra | 1st: Brigham Young University (USA) 2nd: Singapore Management University (Singapore) 3rd: Texas A and M University (USA) |
| 2009 | Aarhus School of Business Chulalongkorn University Copenhagen Business School Fudan University Indiana University Kwantlen Polytechnic University Mahidol University Nanyang Technological University Sabancı University Simon Fraser University Singapore Management University The Hong Kong University of Science and Technology The University of Hong Kong Universiti Kuala Lumpur Malaysian Institute of Information Technology University of Mannheim | 1st: Copenhagen Business School (Denmark) 2nd: Simon Fraser University (Canada) 3rd: University of Mannheim (Germany) |

== Notes ==
"The case for case competitions". 25 June 2014.

Yeo, Y (30 April 2009). "Fighting slump: A CIO's game of golf".
