= University of Asia and the Pacific =

Private university in Pasig, Philippines

- Pamantasan ng Asya at Pasipiko (Filipino)
- Former names: Center for Research and Communication (1967–1995)
- Motto: Unitas (Latin)
- Motto in English: Unity
- Type: Private Nonsectarian Research Non-profit Coeducational Higher education institution
- Established: August 15, 1967 (59 years and 90 days)
- Founders: Jesus P. Estanislao; Bernardo M. Villegas
- Religious affiliation: Catholic (Opus Dei)
- Academic affiliations: PACUCOA
- Chairman: Jose Cuisia Jr.
- Chancellor: Fernando Ocáriz Braña
- President: Philip Yeung
- Vice-president: Bernardo M. Villegas
- Administrative staff: Approx. 330
- Undergraduates: Approx. 2,400
- Postgraduates: Approx. 200
- Location: Pearl Drive, Ortigas Center, Pasig, Metro Manila, Philippines; 14°34′49″N 121°03′38″E
- Publication: Universitas
- Colors: Red and Gold
- Nickname: Dragons
- Sporting affiliations: MNCAA; WNCAA
- Website: www.uap.asia

- Location in Metro Manila Location in Luzon Location in the Philippines

The University of Asia and the Pacific (UA&P; Filipino: Pamantasan ng Asya at Pasipiko) is a private university in the Philippines. It traces its beginnings to the Center for Research and Communication (CRC), which was established on August 15, 1967, as a private think-tank that conducted economic and social research and offered graduate courses in economics.

The spiritual and doctrinal formation given in the university is entrusted to Opus Dei, a Personal prelature of the Catholic Church.

== History ==
On August 15, 1967, a non-profit private research center was formally established by economists Bernardo M. Villegas and Jesus Estanislao, who would later be appointed Finance Secretary during the presidency of Corazon Aquino. It served as a think-tank for private sector businesses and a provider of economics training programs.

After this formal establishment, CRC set up its offices in a rented facility along Jorge Bocobo Street in Malate, Manila. Prior to this, the CRC's first office was at the offices of the United Coconut Authority of the Philippines, a private organization of coconut producers, then headed by Ambassador Jose V. Romero Jr., who served as its executive director.

The expansion of CRC into a university was inspired by a private meeting in Mexico between the founder of Opus Dei, Msgr. Josemaría Escrivá (now Saint), and the founders of CRC in 1970. The meeting encouraged Estanislao and Villegas to expand the institution's horizons internationally, which resulted to its first graduate program, the Masters in Industrial Economics.

CRC then moved to its current campus in Ortigas Center, Pasig, with established formal and informal programs in 1982. A year later, the Center for Food and Agribusiness was established. Then in 1987, CRC was reminded by Bishop Álvaro del Portillo to establish a university. This resulted to the Institute of Development Education, the foundation for the School of Education.

In 1995, the CRC's bid to become a university was approved by the Philippines' Commission on Higher Education, and the new university was named the University of Asia and the Pacific (UA&P). The CRC did not cease to exist, however; it continued to take on consultancy projects under its old name, as the Center for Research and Communication Foundation, Inc.

On March 19, 1989, the UA&P College of Arts and Sciences was established and admitted its first batch of 158 college students. The center finally gained its university status on June 26, 1995, with Estanislao as its first University President and Fr. Ramon Lopez, the regional Vicar of Opus Dei for Asia, as its Vice Grand Chancellor.

=== Timeline ===
1982

- The Center for Research and Communication (CRC) transferred to its present campus in Ortigas Center.

1989

- CRC's College of Arts and Science accepted its first batch of 158 undergraduate students.

1991

- The first Equatorial Rites were held.

1992

- The Sancta Maria Stella Orientis Oratory was inaugurated.

1993

- The first batch of CRC-CAS students graduated.
- The School of Economics, School of Education, and Center for Management were established.

1995

- The Commission on Higher Education (CHED) approved CRC’s conversion into the University of Asia and the Pacific (UA&P).
- The CRC continues to take on consultancy projects under its original name, as the Center for Research and Communication Foundation, Inc. (CRC)
- UA&P put up a straight five-year master’s program (combined undergraduate and graduate program).
- Jesus Estanislao was installed as UA&P’s first President.

1996

- The School of Management was established.

1997

- Mr. Mario D. Camacho was installed as the second University President.

1998

- The University’s Honorary Grand Chancellor, Bishop Javier Echevarria, visited UA&P.

2000

- Jose Maria Mariano was installed as the third University President.

2005

- The Marketing Communication Effectiveness Awards (now the Asia Pacific Tambuli Awards) was launched.
- The first Eucharistic Procession was held.

2006

- The School of Communication was established.

2008

- Bishop Javier Echevarria visited UA&P for the second time.
- The School of Education was renamed the School of Education and Human Development in line with its three interrelated areas of faculty concentration: education, psychology, and human capital development.

2009

- The School of Sciences and Engineering was established.

2013

- The School of Law and Governance was established, with Atty. Joaquin S. San Diego as the founding Dean.
- The School of Education and Human Development established the Child Development and Education (CDE) Center as a preschool, teaching laboratory, and research center in early childhood education.
- UA&P became the first university in the Philippines to publish a sustainability report following the reporting framework of the Global Reporting Initiative (GRI).

2014

- The Parking and Sports Building (PSB) was completed.

2015

- Winston Conrad B. Padojinog was installed as the fourth President of the University.

2016

- UA&P put up a six-year integrated university program (combined junior college/senior high school, undergraduate, and graduate program).
- CHED designated the Teacher Education Program of UA&P as a Center of Development.
- The Institute for Marriage and Family Development was established under the Center for Research and Communication.

2017

- CHED officially granted Autonomous Status to UA&P.
- The Institute of Law was established under the School of Law and Governance, with Atty. Maria Concepcion S. Noche serving as the Dean of the UA&P Law program.
- The University celebrated its Golden Jubilee.

2018

- The PhD in Business Economics program, jointly offered by the School of Economics and the School of Management, was launched.

2019

- The ALB Library expansion project was completed.
- CHED renews Autonomous Status given to UA&P for a period of two years.

2021

- The Placido L. Mapa, Jr. Scholarship Endowment was created.

2022

- The School of Law and Governance was renamed the School of Sciences, Law, and Governance to recognize the valuable and indispensable role of the social sciences in the profound understanding and effective practice of law and governance.

2023

- The University’s Honorary Grand Chancellor, Msgr. Fernando Ocáriz, visited UA&P.
- The School of Communication was renamed the School of Media and Marketing to better reflect the school’s core offerings and clarify its scope.

2024

- The University has been granted Autonomous Status by CHED for the third time under CHED Memorandum Order (CMO) No. 07, Series of 2024. The validity of the autonomous status granted to UA&P shall be for a period of three years commencing September 16, 2024, to September 15, 2027.

== Administration and organization ==
Presidents of the
University of Asia and the Pacific
Jesus Estanislao, 1995–1997
Mario Camacho, 1997–2000
Jose Maria Mariano, 2000–2015
Winston Conrad Padojinog, 2015–2025
John Philip Yeung, 2025–Present

The university is made up of a college offering liberal arts courses as core curriculum and six schools of varied specializations.

A Board of Trustees, chaired by Ambassador Jose L. Cuisia, Jr., takes care of the UA&P Foundation, Inc. Under it is the Management Committee, presided by University President John Philip Yeung, which is the university's governing body. It was formed to steer the university in the path set out for it. It makes sure that all plans, activities, and projects undertaken advance the mission, goals, and values of the university.

== Campus ==
=== Ortigas Campus ===
The Ortigas Campus has five buildings: Administration & Library Building (ALB), College of Arts and Sciences (CAS), Development Communications Building (DCB), APEC Communications Building (ACB), and Parking and Sports Building (PSB).

== Academic programs ==
The University offers 19 undergraduate degrees and 13 stand-alone graduate degrees. It also offers two fast-track master’s programs: 5-Year Program (5YP), which is offered to incoming college freshmen that allows them to earn a bachelor’s degree and a master’s degree in just five years; and a 6-Year Integrated University Program (6YP), which is offered to incoming junior college (JC) students (senior high school) that allows them to earn their JC diploma, a bachelor’s degree, and a master’s degree in just six years. Another program, Lex Honors, offers graduates of Grade 12 an undergraduate degree and a Juris Doctor degree in seven years.

UA&P's academic programs operate on a semester calendar beginning in early August and ending in mid-May. Since 1998, students are graded in increments of 0.25, from 3.50(failing grade) to 1.00. Undergraduate students and students under the fast-track Master's program may graduate with Latin honors depending on their graduating GWA. For students of standalone graduate programs, they may graduate with High Distinction or with Distinction.

University of Asia and the Pacific Academic Awards
Undergraduate Latin Honors		Graduate Academic Awards	
Summa Cum Laude	1.10 - 1.00	with High Distinction	1.20 - 1.00
Magna Cum Laude	1.30 - 1.11	with Distinction	1.50 - 1.21
Cum Laude	1.31 - 1.50		

== Student life ==
=== Student Mentoring Program ===
At UA&P, one-to-one coaching program for liberal education is offered through its Student Mentoring Program.

The Student Mentoring Program provides students with the opportunity to avail of personal advising and assistance in different areas and at various stages of their student life. It will help them to reflect upon, assess, evaluate, and integrate their learning skills and experiences—under the guidance of their mentor—in a way that benefits the acquisition and strengthening of their intellectual skills and moral criteria. This is aimed toward the holistic formation of the students’ personal, professional, and social life.

=== Student Development Programs ===
There are three sub-programs that handle a more specific range of activities to ensure learning and development even on activities that involve personal interest. These are Organizations and Leadership (which focuses on the development of the student organizations and student leaders through assemblies, leadership workshops, and facilitating students’ participation in external opportunities), Kultura (which seeks to preserve and promote culture and the arts and its significant role in liberal education), and Civics (which focuses on socio-civic initiatives, and guides student organizations in the execution of their outreach projects).

=== Sports Development Programs ===
At UA&P, participation in sports is seen not only as a mechanism for the development of students’ physical competence and fitness, but more importantly for their character formation. With each training session or competition, with each victory or loss—students imbibe the values of teamwork, self-mastery, discipline, and the practice of sportsmanship at all times.

The University competes in the Men's National Collegiate Athletics Association (MNCAA) and the Women's National Collegiate Athletics Association (WNCAA) and supports teams in basketball, futsal, volleyball, handball, tennis, badminton, swimming, arnis, taekwondo, aikido, karate, table tennis, and athletics.

In December 2008, the men's futsal team won the championship cup in the MNCAA.

In October 2009, the women's basketball and volleyball teams won the championship titles in the WNCAA.

In February 2012, the UA&P Firestarters, the university's all-female cheerdance varsity, grabbed the WNCAA cheerdance competition gold.

=== Student Organizations ===
Student interest groups are available for writers, theater artists, dancers and dance enthusiasts, and musicians and music producers. There are associations for students interested in environmental conservation, multi-cultural understanding, outreaches and advocacies, entrepreneurship, case competitions, or student representations. A host of other student groups and volunteer opportunities are also available. The UA&P Chorale represents the University in external competitions. In addition, each school, college, institute, or academic program also has its own academic association.

The Office of Student Affairs' Civics Desk holds the annual youth conference Civitas Asia and the BIGGKAS project which extends tutorial sessions to local public schools. The desk also supports student organizations with socio-civic aims and activities.

Virtus is the UA&P Competition League, an association of the University's academic competing teams. It consists of FORUM: The UA&P Debate Society, Aureum: The UA&P Case Competition Pool, Odyssey: The UA&P Junior College Competition Pool, Citadel: The UA&P Investment Society, Minerva: The UA&P Public Policy Delegation, Trivium: The UA&P English Olympiad, Icarus: The UA&P STEAM Team, and the UA&P Model United Nations.

Virtus has led numerous student achievements including making UA&P the first Philippine university to win the Asian Business Case Competition @ Nanyang, Citibank APAC Treasury and Trade Solutions Case Competition, and 2022 Asian English Olympics, among other local and international events.

=== Student Government ===
All students are highly encouraged to participate in student government by voting in student government elections, and by supporting the various projects of the elected officers of the University Student Government (USG), the highest governing body of the student population. Students may also take a more active role by volunteering for the different committees under each USG officer, by joining a political party, by running for office (whether under a political party or as an independent candidate), or by volunteering for the UA&P Commission on Elections.

== Center for Research and Communication ==
Since the CHED's approval of the creation of University of Asia and the Pacific in 1995, a separate unit taking on the name of the Center for Research and Communication has taken on consultancy work in close association with the new university and focusing on the areas of business, economics, international relations, and education, as well as more recently food and agribusiness, energy, data science, analytics, and transportation and logistics.

Aside from its regular business consultancy work, CRC's linkages with UA&P over the years have allowed it to partner with corporations and foundations to fund Professorial Chairs in the areas of Policy Research, Social Economics, Migration and Overseas Filipino Work, Family and Youth Education to establish institutional research work.

CRC made research on social economics a major part of its agenda beginning in 2013, with the agenda defined as "how economics and business can–without losing their predominant concerns on getting the maximum material benefits from relatively scarce resources." Much of CRC's work in this area has focused on cooperatives, with one major initiative being the gathering of stakeholder inputs for the Implementing Rules and Regulations of the Philippines' Cooperative Development Authority Charter of 2019 (Republic Act 11364).

In 2014, CRC also established a research chair specifically focused on Migration and Overseas Filipino Work, initially in partnership with the BPI Foundation. Its notable research in the area concerns the support system needs of OFWs, on their reintegratrion experiences upon returning to the Philippines, and an influential 2022 study on OFWs physical and mental health needs which was later awarded the inaugural APEC Healthy Women, Healthy Economies Research Prize by the APEC Forum on Women and the Economy in 2019.

== Notable alumni ==
- Ferdie Estrella – Mayor of Baliuag, Bulacan
- Ralph Recto – Secretary of Finance of the Philippines
- Bongbong Marcos – 17th President of the Philippines
- Rene Almendras – President of AC Infrastructure Holdings; Senior Managing Director of Ayala Corporation; Former Secretary of Foreign Affairs of the Philippines
- Jose Enrique Garcia – Governor of Bataan
- Abra – Filipino Rapper
- Eduardo Oban
