= Jesus Estanislao =

Filipino economist

27th Secretary of the Department of Finance
- In office January 1, 1990 – June 30, 1992
- President: Corazon Aquino
- Preceded by: Vicente Jayme
- Succeeded by: Ramon del Rosario

6th Director-General of the National Economic and Development Authority Concurrently Secretary of Socioeconomic Planning
- In office 1989–1990
- President: Corazon Aquino
- Preceded by: Solita Monsod
- Succeeded by: Cayetano Paderanga, Jr.

Personal details
- Education: University of San Carlos; Fordham University; Harvard University
- Occupation: Professor
- Profession: Economist

Jesus P. Estanislao is a Filipino economist best known for having been the 6th Socio-economic Planning Secretary and concurrent Director-General of the National Economic and Development Authority (NEDA) from 1989-1990, and Secretary of Finance of the Philippines from 1990-1992, during the government of President Corazon Aquino. He presently heads two private institutes committed to governance reforms: the Institute of Corporate Directors (for corporate governance), and the Institute for Solidarity in Asia (for national governance). He also chairs the President's Governance Advisory Council, which advises the Philippine President on governance issues.

== Studies and Academic work ==
Estanislao holds a Ph.D. from Harvard University, and was also a Teaching Fellow and Research Fellow. He obtained his MA in economics from Fordham University in Economics and Ph.B. (summa cum laude) from the University of San Carlos.

He has been conferred honorary doctoral degrees from Angeles University, Xavier University, St. Paul University, and Manila Central University. He holds the title of University Professor at the University of Asia and the Pacific and a visiting professor at the IESE Business School.

His published works include:

- Breaking Through: The road from resolution to results
- A new ASEAN in a new millennium (With: Simon Tay and Hadi Soesastro)
- Reinventing ASEAN (With: Simon Tay and Hadi Soesastro)
- Responsible Citizenship: Essays on Civic Spirit on the Common Good
- Equipped for Battle: A Primer on Active Citizen Involvement in Governance
- Guideposts for Governance: Indispensable Values for Individuals, Corporations, Institutions, and Government Units
- Philippines 2030 Journey to Nationhood: Towards a National Community of Responsible Citizens
- Responsible Citizenship III: Empowering Individuals and Strengthening Communities
- Towards a National Culture of Excellence
- Responsible Citizenship IV: Rebuilding the Nation through Values
- Foundation for People Development
- Responsible Citizenship III
- Responsible Citizenship II
- Responsible Citizenship
- Starting Over ( Reforming Corporate Governance in the Phils.)
- Corporate Governance for Bank Directors
- Institute of Corporate Directors– Practical Guidelines for Board Governance Committees
- Institute of Corporate Directors – Practical Guidelines for Audit Committees
- Institute of Corporate Directors – Practical Guidelines for Risk Oversight Committees
- Institute of Corporate Directors – Practical Guidelines for Financial Numeracy for Corporate Directors

== Works ==
Estanislao has spent much of his career founding or rehabilitating institutions. More recently, he has focused on improving governance in the Philippines for both public and private institutions as a way of reducing corruption there.

He was the founding Dean (1998) of the Asian Development Bank Institute in Tokyo.

He also served as the founding president (1992-1997) of the University of Asia and the Pacific, which grew out of the Center for Research and Communication, of which he was the founding Executive Director (1969-1981).

After the 1986 People Power revolution in the Philippines, he became the Chairman of the Development Bank of the Philippines, which he rehabilitated. Then he was appointed to the Cabinet of President Corazon Aquino, whom he served as Secretary of Economic Planning and Director General of the National and Economic Development Authority (1989), and later as Secretary of Finance (1990-1992). As the country's chief economic officer, he oversaw the economic recovery and reform program of a newly reinstalled democracy.

After he left government, Dr. Estanislao was asked to become the Philippine representative in APEC's Eminent Persons Group by President Fidel Ramos, whom he served as Adviser during the Philippine chairmanship of APEC in 1996. He also served as the Philippine representative in ASEAN's Eminent Persons Group on Vision 2020.

In 1992, Dr. Estanislao was awarded the Philippine Legion of Honor.

In 2009, the Management Association of the Philippines (MAP) named him "Management Man of the Year."

He is Member of the Papal Foundation “Centesimus Annus Pro Pontifice” (CAPP).

Preceded by Solita Monsod	Director-General of the National Economic and Development Authority; 1989 – 1990	Succeeded by Cayetano Paderanga, Jr.
