= Kenneth Tanate =

Filipino civil servant

Executive Director of Philippine Competition Commission
- Incumbent
- Assumed office 2024

Personal details
- Born: Kenneth V. Tanate
- Education: University of San Carlos (BS) University of Tsukuba (MA, PhD) Development Academy of the Philippines (MDM)
- Profession: Civil servant

Kenneth V. Tanate is a Filipino public official and policy expert and development planner. He is the executive director of the Philippine Competition Commission.

== Early life and education ==
Tanate took his Bachelor of Science in Electronics and Communications Engineering at the University of San Carlos in Cebu City. He holds a Postgraduate Diploma in Engineering and Technology Management at the University of Queensland in Australia. He finished his Master in Environmental Sciences and PhD in Policy and Planning Sciences at the University of Tsukuba in Japan.

In 2013, Tanate took his Master in Development Management- Public Management Development Program (Senior Executive Class) at the Development Academy of the Philippines.

== Early career ==
Tanate served as an assistant director-general of the National Economic and Development Authority (now the Department of Economy, Planning and Development).

== Insights ==
In April 7, 2025, Tanate take some insights essential role of competition in the telecommunications sector with regards on entry of new players. He also stated that dismantling these barriers is vital for improving services, lowering prices, and increasing accessibility for Filipino consumers and businesses. he Said that "The Konektadong Pinoy bill is a decisive step toward dismantling these barriers. Many of these concerns fall within the mandate of the PCC. We welcome the additional roles and responsibilities being proposed for the PCC under this bill," Tanate said.

In May 23, 2023 Tenate stated, "In terms of joining or market situations, more players will be better for the consumers. No cap will be better. Let the market dictate on the extent of the motorcycle limits,"

== Controversies ==
In December 10, 2024, Tanate faced a scrutiny regarding tariff cuts did not lower retail prices, amid allegations of collusion and market manipulation.
