= Philippine Competition Act =

Congress of the Philippines
- Long title: An Act Providing for a National Competition Policy Prohibiting Anti-Competitive Agreements, Abuse of Dominant Position and Anti-Competitive Mergers and Acquisitions, Establishing the Philippine Competition Commission and Appropriating Funds Therefor
- Citation: Republic Act 10667
- Territorial extent: Philippines
- Enacted by: House of Representatives
- Enacted by: Senate
- Signed by: Benigno Aquino III
- Signed: July 21, 2015
- Status: In force

The Philippine Competition Act, officially designated as Republic Act No. 10667, is a Philippine law that was signed into law by President Benigno Aquino III on July 21, 2015, and established the quasi-judicial Philippine Competition Commission to enforce the act. The act is intended to ensure efficient and fair market competition among businesses engaged in trade, industry, and all commercial economic activities. It prohibits anti-competitive agreements, abuses of dominant positions, and mergers and acquisitions that limit, prevent, and restrict competition.

== History ==
The Philippine Competition Act (PCA) or Republic Act No. 10667 is the primary competition law of the Philippines. It aims to promote and protect market competition in the country. It protects the well-being of consumers and preserves the efficiency of competition in the marketplace.

A comprehensive competition law was first proposed in the late 1980s during the administration of President Cory Aquino.

The Philippine Competition Act was passed in 2015 after being stuck in Congress for 24 years. The Act is expected to improve consumer protection and help accelerate investment and job creation in the country, consistent with the goal of the national government in fostering an inclusive form of economic growth.

Enforcement of this law would help ensure that markets are open and free, challenging anti-competitive business practices, while maintaining an economic environment where businesses could compete based on the quality of their work.

A competitive market means a market with multiple buyers and multiple sellers, which has the effect of driving market prices lower and offering consumers more choices. For some economists, a "truly competitive market" encourages efficiency and innovation, forcing businesses to excel.

In 2014, a drastic increase in the price of garlic led to then President Benigno S. Aquino III conducting an investigation, which resulted in the discovery of a cartel controlling garlic imports. This led to Senator Paolo Benigno "Bam" Aquino IV authoring the 2014 Philippine Competition Act. This became the first instance wherein the Philippines gained a law specifically on competition. The Philippines was the only country in ASEAN without a competition law and the integration of ASEAN into a single market was an impetus to pass the act.

== Philippine Competition Commission ==
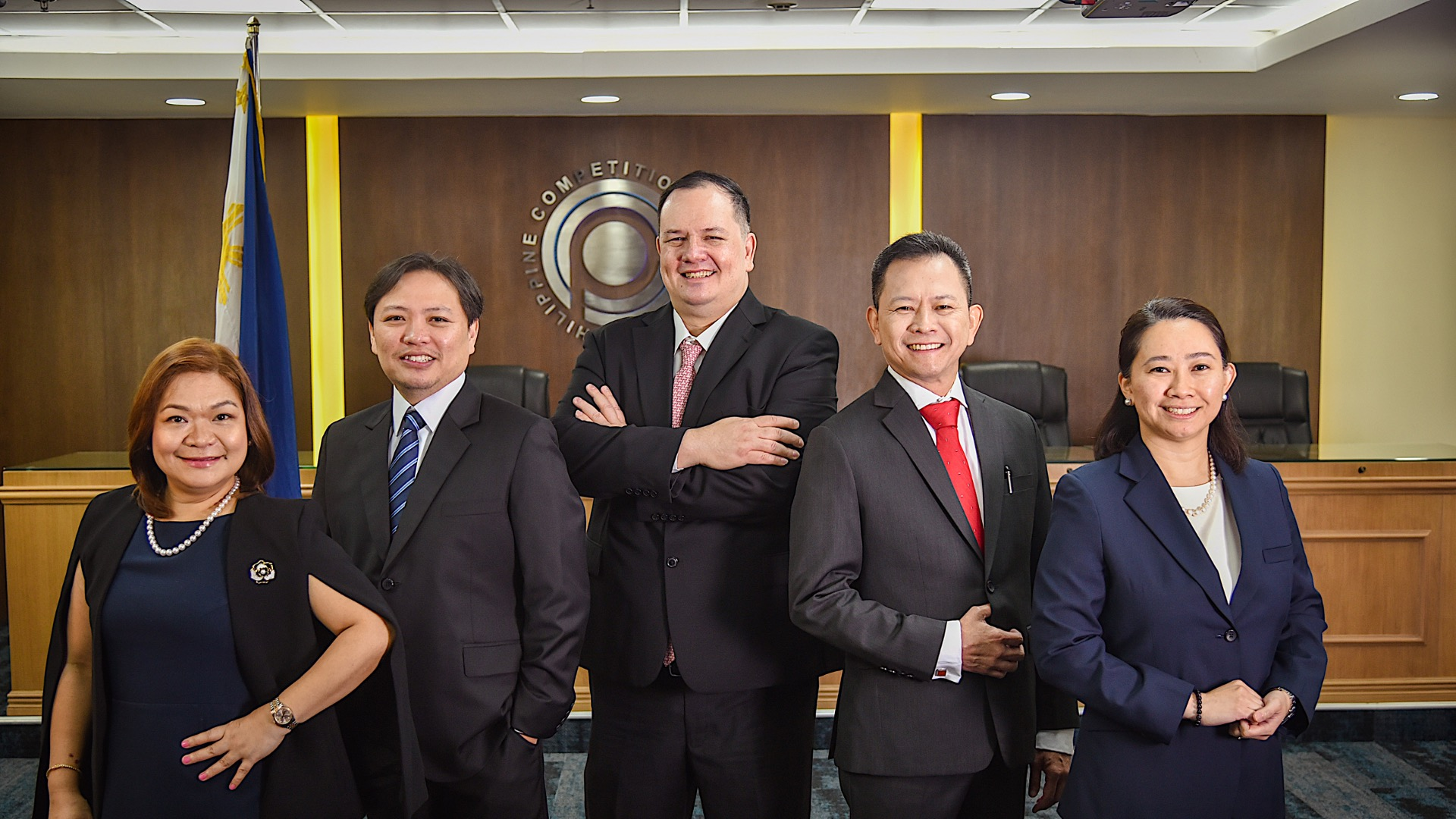
The Current Commission (as of 2026; photo from 2023; L to R: Lolibeth Ramit-Medrano, Michael Peloton, Michael Aguinaldo, Ferdinand Negre, Marah Querol)

The Philippine Competition Commission is an independent, quasi-judicial body created to enforce the act. It is attached to the Office of the President of the Philippines. It consists of a chairperson and four commissioners appointed for seven-year terms.

The first commissioners were appointed to the Philippine Competition Commission and sworn in on January 27, 2015. Arsenio Balisacan resigned from his post as Philippine Socioeconomic Planning Secretary and Director General of the National Economic and Development Authority to lead the Philippine Competition Commission.

In February 2023, President Bongbong Marcos appointed Michael Aguinaldo as the new chairperson of the Philippine Competition Commission, replacing former chairperson Arsenio Balisacan.

== Provisions of the Philippine Competition Act ==
The Philippine Competition Commission issued the key provisions of the Republic Act No. 10667, otherwise known as the Philippine Competition Act, on June 3, 2016. The provisions took effect on June 18, 2016.

The Philippine Competition Act provides for the regulation of the country's markets to curtail anti-competitive behavior and punish cartels and other unfair monopolies.

Under Sec. 3 of RA 10667, the Commission shall impose this Act against any person or entity engaged in any trade, industry and commerce in the Republic of the Philippines. Moreover, it shall also be applied to international trade with direct, substantial, and reasonably foreseeable effects in trade, industry and commerce.

Under Sec. 6 of RA 10667, the Act provides the rules in creating the Philippine Competition Commission.

- The commission will be composed of 1 cabinet secretary-level Chairman, and 4 Commissioners. They will serve for 7 years, without reappointment and shall enjoy security of term.
- During the term of the Commissioners, they shall not hold any other office and employment, directly or indirectly practice any profession (except participating in government-owned corporations) and engage in a conflict of interest of their office.
- The Compensation and Salaries for Members and Personnel of the Commission shall be exempted from the Republic Act No. 6758 (Salary Standardization Act) and will be based on objective classification system focusing on the importance and responsibilities of their positions.

Under Sec. 12 of RA 10667, the Commission prohibits Anti-Competitive Agreements and Acts. The law indicated the following violations:

- Restricting competition as to price, or components thereof, or other terms of trade.
- Fixing price at an auction or in any form of bidding including cover bidding, bid suppression, bid rotation and market allocation and other analogous practices of bid manipulation.

Other anti-competitive agreements whose "object or effect of substantially preventing, restricting or lessening competition" are also prohibited but subject to "rule of reason".

These include:

- Setting, limiting, or controlling production, markets, technical development, or investment.
- Dividing or sharing the market, whether by volume of sales or purchases, territory, type of goods or services, buyers or sellers or any other means.

=== Abuse of Dominant Position ===
Under Sec. 15 of RA 10667, the entities (whether companies or individuals) are prohibited from abusing their dominant position by engaging in conduct that would substantially prevent, restrict or lessen competition. Such conduct includes predatory pricing, imposing barriers to entry in an anti-competitive manner, unfair exercise of monopsony power, among others

=== Mergers and acquisitions ===
Under Sec. 17 of RA 10667, merger or acquisition agreements that substantially prevent, restrict or lessen competition are prohibited.

- Parties to the merger or acquisition agreement where the value of the transaction exceeds Two Billion Two Million Pesos (Php 2,200,000,000.00) and the size of the person/party exceeds Five Billion Six Hundred Million Pesos (Php 5, 600, 000, 000.00) are required to notify the Commission of such agreement, and they cannot consummate the same without the approval of the commission until thirty (30) days. The Commission may also prescribe other criteria (e.g., increased market share in the relevant market in excess of minimum thresholds) that would trigger this notification requirement.
- When the agreement is violated, the parties shall be subject to an administrative fine of one-percent (1%) to five percent (5%) off the value of the transaction.
- The Commission may request for further information that are reasonably necessary which would extend the period within which the agreement may not be consummated for another sixty (60) days. The merger or acquisition shall be considered approved and parties may proceed to consummate it when the period has already expired without decision.
- If the Commission declared that the agreement is prohibited, it may prohibit the implementation of the agreement unless there are changes indicated or the parties enter into legally enforceable agreements stated by the commission.
- The Merger or acquisition agreement that are prohibited may be exempt from prohibition by the Commission provided that the parties establish that the concentration has brought or expected to bring gains in efficiency that are greater that the effects of any limitation on competition or faced with actual or imminent financial failure.

=== Fines and Penalties ===
The law imposes fines and penalties on violators of the law. Under Sec. 29 of RA 10667, administrative fines of up to Php 250 million pesos can be imposed. In addition, the party which fails to comply with the commission's order shall pay a penalty of not less than Php 50,000.00 up to Php 2,000,000.00 for each violation. For those parties that provide incorrect or misleading information, it may impose fines of at most Php 1,000,000.00.

Under Sec. 30 of RA 10667, criminal penalties for anti-competitive agreements are punishable by imprisonment of 2 to 7 years and a fine of Php 50 million pesos to Php 250 million pesos. To maintain the real value of such fines, the amount is subject to adjustment every five years.

=== Preliminary Inquiry ===
Under Sec. 31 of RA 10667, the Commission shall have the sole and exclusive authority to conduct a preliminary inquiry after a verified party filed a complaint on the basis of probable cause. The Commission may issue an order for the temporary termination of those certain acts by the respondent party after due notice and hearing and once the basis of facts and evidence are presented. If the evidence is validated, the Commission may file criminal complaints against the Act on the Department of Justice which will do preliminary investigation.

=== Relationship with Existing Sector Regulators ===
Under Sec. 32 of RA 10667, the commission will have original and primary jurisdiction over all competition-related issues. It shall also have jurisdiction over all other issues that involve both competition and non-competition issues, but the concerned sector regulator must be consulted and afforded reasonable opportunity to submit its own opinions and recommendations before the commission can make its decision. To promote competition, protect consumer and prevent abuse of market power by dominant players, the commission and the sector regulators shall work together to issue the rules and regulations.

=== Confidentiality of Information ===
Under Sec. 34 of RA 10667, the law protects confidential business information submitted to the commission. The identity of the persons who provide information to the Commission under condition of anonymity, as a rule, would likewise remain confidential. However, the Commission may disclose information provided that the entity agrees or if the information is required to be disclosed by law or a court. A fine of not less than Php 1,000,000.00 but not more than Php 5,000,000.00 shall be imposed if the provision is violated.

=== Leniency Program ===
Under Sec. 35 of RA 10667, the Leniency Program shall be developed to be awarded to any entity in the form of exemption from suit or reduction of any fine in exchange of voluntary disclosure of information with regards to anti-competitive activities before or during the preliminary inquiry provided:

1. If the Commission have not received yet this information from other sources.
2. If the entity has shown initiative to terminate its participation therein after the discovery of illegal activity.
3. If the entity provided the complete information and cooperation throughout the investigation.
4. If the entity was not the head and did not persuade other parties to join in the activity.

=== Non-Adversarial Remedies ===
Under Sec. 37 of RA 10667, the Commission shall encourage voluntary compliance with this Act and other competition laws by making available to parties the analogous non-adversarial administrative remedies.

- Binding Ruling
  - When there is no prior complaint or investigation being done, any entity that is in doubt in a contemplated act is exempt from violations of the Act.
- Show Cause Order
  - After conducting a preliminary inquiry or filing of complaint by an interested party against any entity that may violating the provisions of the Act, and it finds that the issuance of a show cause order would be an interest of the public, the Commission shall issue written description of the evidence conducted and require the entity to show cause why the Commission shall not issue an order to stop its business conduct practices.
- Consent Order
  - Before the Commission provided its findings on preliminary inquiry, any entity or entities under inquiry which does not admit violating this Act may submit a written proposal for the entry of consent order.
- Monitoring of Compliance
  - The Commission shall monitor the compliance by the entity and entities concerned.

=== Appeals of the Decisions of the Commission ===
Under Sec. 39 of RA 10667, decisions of the Commission shall be appealable to the Court of Appeals in accordance with the Rules of Court.

=== Indemnity ===
Under Sec. 43 of RA 10667, the Commission shall underwrite lawsuit costs to its chairperson, Commissioners, officers, employees provided that they are not found to have violated the Act. The costs and expenses incurred in defending their actions may be paid by the Commission in advance of the disposition.

=== Jurisdiction of the Regional Trial Court ===
Under Sec. 44 of RA 10667, the Regional Trial Court of the city or province where the entity of subject matter of the case conducts its business, shall have original and exclusive jurisdiction, regardless of the penalties imposed, of all criminal and civil cases involving violation of this Act and other competition-related laws.

=== Private Action ===
Under Sec. 45 of RA 10667, any person who suffers direct injury by reason of any violation of this Act may institute a separate and independent civil action after the commission has completed the preliminary inquiry.

=== Prohibition on the Issuance of Temporary Restraining Orders, Preliminary Injunctions and Preliminary Mandatory Injunctions ===
Under Sec. 47 of RA 10667, only the Court of Appeals and the Supreme Court may issue a temporary restraining order, preliminary injunction or preliminary mandatory injunction against the Commission in the exercise of its duties or functions.

=== Congressional Oversight Committee ===
Under Sec. 49 of RA 10667, the Commission shall form the Congressional Oversight Committee (COCC) composed of the following individuals:

1. Chairperson of the Senate Committee on Trade and Commerce
2. Chairperson of the Senate Committee on Economic Affairs
3. Chairperson of the Senate Committee on Finance
4. Chairperson of the House of Representatives Committee on Economic Affairs
5. Chairperson of the House of Representatives Committee on Trade and Industry
6. Chairperson of the House of Representatives Committee on Appropriations
7. Two (2) members each from the Senate and the House of Representatives who shall be designated by the Senate President and the Speaker of the House of Representatives

== See also ==
- Philippine energy law
