= Karl Kendrick Chua =

Filipino economist

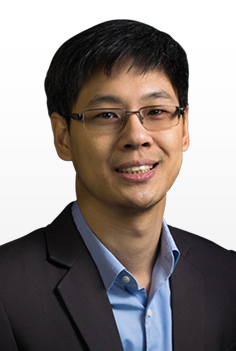

15th Director-General of the National Economic and Development Authority Concurrently Secretary of Socioeconomic Planning
- In office June 2, 2021 – June 30, 2022; April 17, 2020 – June 2, 2021 (Acting)
- President: Rodrigo Duterte
- Preceded by: Ernesto Pernia
- Succeeded by: Arsenio Balisacan

Undersecretary of the Department of Finance Strategy, Economics, and Results Group
- In office September 29, 2016 – April 17, 2020
- President: Rodrigo Duterte
- Preceded by: Position created
- Succeeded by: Antonio G. Lambino II

Personal details
- Born: Karl Kendrick Tiu Chua; July 14, 1978 (age 48) Metro Manila, Philippines
- Spouse: Alanna Chua (m. 2009)
- Children: 2
- Education: Ateneo de Manila University (B.S.); University of the Philippines Diliman (M.A. & Ph.D.)
- Occupation: Government official; researcher; university lecturer
- Profession: Economist

Karl Kendrick Tiu Chua (Chinese: 蔡榮富; Pe̍h-ōe-jī: Chhòâ Êng-hù; pinyin: Cài Róngfù; born July 14, 1978) is a Filipino economist who served as the Director-General of the National Economic and Development Authority (NEDA) and Secretary of Socioeconomic Planning under the Duterte administration from 2021 to 2022. He was appointed by President Rodrigo Duterte as acting secretary in April 2020, and became the official secretary on June 2, 2021, succeeding Ernesto Pernia. A former World Bank senior economist, he previously served as an undersecretary of the Department of Finance.

== Early life and education ==
Chua was born to a Chinese Filipino family on July 14, 1978. He was raised in Manila where he attended Xavier School in San Juan and graduated high school in 1996. While in high school, he participated in outreach programs in the Correctional Institution for Women, Payatas and Barasoain in San Juan where he also taught Catechism, English and mathematics to urban poor children.

He attended the Ateneo de Manila University and earned a Bachelor of Science in Management Engineering in 2000. He later enrolled at the University of the Philippines Diliman, graduating from the U.P. School of Economics in 2003 with a Master of Economics. In 2011, Chua received Doctor of Philosophy in the same discipline also from U.P. where he served as research assistant to professors Solita Monsod, Felipe Medalla and Benjamin Diokno for a study on the country's slowing economy in 2005 which resulted in the implementation of an expanded value-added tax in the country.

== Career ==
Chua started his career as a system analyst with Accenture (Andersen Consulting) from 2000 to 2002. In 2004, he started teaching mathematics and economics at his alma mater, Ateneo de Manila, a year after completing his M.Ec. at U.P. He was then hired as a research analyst for the World Bank Group in 2005 and resigned from his teaching job when he was promoted as its country economist for the Philippines in 2008. As an economist for World Bank, Chua spent a year and half in different places in Mindanao, including Marawi and Tawi-Tawi, where he led a team of researchers conducting a comprehensive jobs report on the impoverished island region. He served as a World Bank senior economist from 2012 until his resignation to join government service in September 2016.

Chua was sworn in as Undersecretary for the Strategy, Economics and Results Group of the Department of Finance on September 29, 2016. As Finance undersecretary, he served as strategic adviser to Secretary Carlos Dominguez III and President Duterte's cabinet economic development cluster. In 2017, Chua was frequently seen participating in congressional deliberations on the administration's comprehensive tax reform bill which aimed to decrease personal income taxes and introduce higher consumption taxes to support the government's Build! Build! Build program. He was described as the "poster boy of tax reform" by several media outlets and was instrumental in the passage of the Tax Reform for Acceleration and Inclusion Act (TRAIN Act) in December 2017.

Chua also served as the administration's point person in Congress for its second tax reform agenda to lower corporate income taxes in the country in 2019. Initially named the Corporate Income Tax and Incentives Reform Act (CITIRA), the bill aimed to decrease corporate taxes from 30 to 20 percent to encourage job creation while transforming the incentive program into performance-based incentives. He is also credited for the passage of legislations increasing the sin tax on tobacco and alcohol products and introducing a sugary drink tax and excise taxes on electronic cigarettes and vapes to fund the universal health care program signed into law in February 2019. On April 17, 2020, following President Duterte's acceptance of National Economic and Development Authority secretary Ernesto Pernia's resignation due to "personal reasons" and "differences in development philosophy" with some Cabinet members as the country battled the COVID-19 pandemic, Chua was appointed as the agency's acting secretary.

As socioeconomic secretary, Chua was tasked to formulate the country's economic recovery measures and a "new normal" plan following the financial shocks caused by the COVID-19 crisis in the country. In May 2020, he reintroduced a modified corporate tax reform bill as one such measure under the post-COVID-19 Philippine Program for Recovery with Equity. Under the Corporate Recovery and Tax Incentives for Enterprises Act (CREATE) which replaced the earlier CITIRA, corporate income taxes will be reduced to 25 percent in the short term to spur economic activity in the aftermath of the pandemic. Chua also announced that the Balik Probinsya program or relocation of businesses and workers to provinces outside Metro Manila is included in the new tax incentives package, and that the government was considering levying taxes on digital goods and introducing a new sin tax as new revenue sources. He also announced the full implementation of the Philippine national identity cards as an agency priority.

President Duterte appointed Chua as the official Secretary of Socioeconomic Planning and the Director-General of NEDA on April 22, 2021. His nomination was confirmed by the Commission on Appointments on June 2, making him the youngest secretary in the Duterte Cabinet.

== Personal life ==
Chua is married to Alanna Chua, whom he met in 2001 through the Ateneo Christian Life Community, of which they were both members. They wed on November 28, 2009. They have two sons together, Keid Ashby and Koby Altar, born in 2015 and 2023 respectively.

== Awards ==
Chua is a recipient of the 2018 Outstanding Young Men and Women of the Philippines (TOYM) Award in the field of Economic Development.

Political offices
| Preceded by Ernesto Pernia | Director-General of the National Economic and Development Authority; Concurrently Secretary of Socioeconomic Planning; 2020–2022 | Succeeded by Arsenio Balisacan |
