= Philippine Competition Commission =

Philippine independent commission

- Komisyon ng Kumpetisyon ng Pilipinas

Agency overview
- Formed: January 27, 2016
- Headquarters: 25/F Vertis North Corporate Center I North Avenue, Quezon City 1105
- Agency executives: Michael G. Aguinaldo, Chairperson; Kenneth Tanate, Executive Director
- Parent agency: Office of the President of the Philippines
- Website: www.phcc.gov.ph

The Philippine Competition Commission (PhCC) is an independent, quasi-judicial body formed to implement the Philippine Competition Act (Republic Act No. 10667). The PhCC aims to promote and maintain market competition within the Philippines by regulating anti-competition behavior. The main role of the PhCC is to promote economic efficiency within the Philippine economy, ensuring fair and healthy market competition.

The Philippine Competition Commission creates a regulatory framework for market competition in order to safeguard consumers, with the goal of providing them with more alternatives for what goods or services to purchase. It would also have the effect of creating competitive businesses that would encourage economic efficiency and innovation.

The Philippine Competition Commission was formed on January 27, 2016. Since that time, the Philippine Competition Commission has formed offices through their mandate.

== Background ==
The Philippine Competition Act (PCA) or Republic Act No. 10667 is the primary competition law of the Philippines. It aims to promote and protect market competition in the country. It protects the well-being of consumers and preserves the efficiency of competition in the marketplace.

A comprehensive competition law was first proposed in the late 1980s during the administration of President Cory Aquino.

The Philippine Competition Act was passed in 2015 after being stuck in Congress for 24 years. The Act is expected to improve consumer protection and help accelerate investment and job creation in the country, consistent with the goal of the national government in fostering an inclusive form of economic growth.

Enforcement of this law would help ensure that markets are open and free, challenging anti-competitive business practices, while maintaining an economic environment where businesses could compete based on the quality of their work.

A competitive market means a market with multiple buyers and multiple sellers, which has the effect of driving market prices lower and offering consumers more choices. For some economists, a "truly competitive market" encourages efficiency and innovation, forcing businesses to excel.

In 2014, a drastic increase in the price of garlic led to then President Benigno S. Aquino III conducting an investigation, which resulted in the discovery of a cartel controlling garlic imports. This led to Senator Paolo Benigno "Bam" Aquino IV authoring the 2014 Philippine Competition Act. This became the first instance wherein the Philippines gained a law specifically on competition. The Philippines was the only country in ASEAN without a competition law and the integration of ASEAN into a single market was an impetus to pass the act.

== Importance of Competition ==
The PhCC’s official website cites the following reasons for considering market competition as important:

1. Competition leads to both economic growth and reduced poverty. It helps markets work better, fosters innovation, and protects investors and consumers. It will help to encourage wider domestic and foreign direct investments.
2. Competition provides an improved enabling environment for small and medium enterprises that are critical to more inclusive economic growth and development in the country.
3. Consumers win because free and fair competition leads to more choices, lower prices, and higher quality of goods.

In addition, the official website states that in its capacity as a regulatory body, the Philippine Competition Commission helps protect markets in the Philippines from anti-competitive behavior, thereby protecting consumers from having their choices unfairly limited by companies that seek to severely limit these choices in order to increase profits. Effective protection of competition in the market will also protect small and medium businesses seeking to offer better quality and/or lower priced goods and services by ensuring that dominant players do not engage in practices that unfairly takes advantage of their market share.

The official website of the Philippine Competition Commission states that a stable, fair playing field is expected to result in greater interest among foreign investors, which in turn would lead to an expansion of the market, and opening global opportunities for companies in the Philippines, big or small.

According to Howard Ellis, an anti-trust lawyer based in the United States, economics is inherently individualistic, and without the individual's ability to choose freely economics cannot exist. He says that by principle, a monopoly limits the free choice of an individual in the market by controlling both the price and the scarcity of a product. He says that this inability to choose creates an economic environment that is unsuitable for practicing the economic optimum, which describes the best application of limited resources to unlimited wants of consumers. A factor in economic stagnation is brought about by this lack of the pursuit of the optimum.

== Commission members ==
The Philippine Competition Commission, being an attached agency to the Office of the President, is headed by a chairperson and four Commissioners. The chairperson and the Commissioners make up the decision-making panel of the commission, and they work together in deciding on the different market competition issues that are under the jurisdiction of the PCC. In accordance with the Philippine Competition Act (PCA), they shall be appointed by the President, and have the rank equivalent of cabinet secretary and undersecretary, respectively. The primary requirement for their appointment would be being distinguished professionally in public, civic or academic service in the fields of economics, law, finance, commerce or engineering. Provided, That at least one commissioner shall be a member of the Philippine Bar with at least ten years of experience in the active practice of law, and at least one shall be an economist.

According to the PCA, the chairperson and the Commissioners are to serve for 7 years without reappointment, and shall enjoy security of tenure. Of the first set of appointees, the chairperson and two Commissioners shall hold officer for a term of seven years, and the other two Commissioners shall serve a term of five years.

Appointed by former President Benigno Aquino III, Arsenio Balisacan served as the first chairperson of the Philippine Competition Commission. After having left his position as the Economic Planning Secretary and Director-General of the National Economic and Development Authority (NEDA), he took his oath of office on January 27, 2016. Appointed PCC Commissioners Stella Quimbo, Johannes Bernabe, Elcid Butuyan and Menardo Guevarra also took part in the said oathtaking ceremony. In accordance with the PCA, Balisacan, as chair, would have served a seven-year term without reappointment. Quimbo and Bernabe will have a term of seven years, while Butuyan and Guevarra will have a term of five years.

Among the pioneer chairman and commissioners, Guevarra, Butuyan, Quimbo and Balisacan did not finish their set term. Guevarra vacated his position after being appointed as Senior Deputy Executive Secretary under the Office of the President on June 30, 2016, and was replaced by Amabelle Asuncion. Butuyan left the commission in July 2017 and was replaced by Macario De Claro Jr. Quimbo vacated her seat after she got elected to the House of Representatives in the 2019 general election and was replaced by Emerson Aquende.

In March 2022, attorneys Marah Querol and Michael Peloton joined the PCC, replacing De Claro and Ascuncion whose terms had ended the year prior.

On June 30, 2022, Balisacan was appointed by President Bongbong Marcos to be the head of the National Economic and Development Authority thus vacating his position as chairman of the commission. Bernabe took over as OIC chairman and was replaced by Michael Aguinaldo after the former's term ended in January 2023.

In March 2023, Ferdinand Negre joined the PCC. Before he was the dean of Manuel L. Quezon University School of Law.

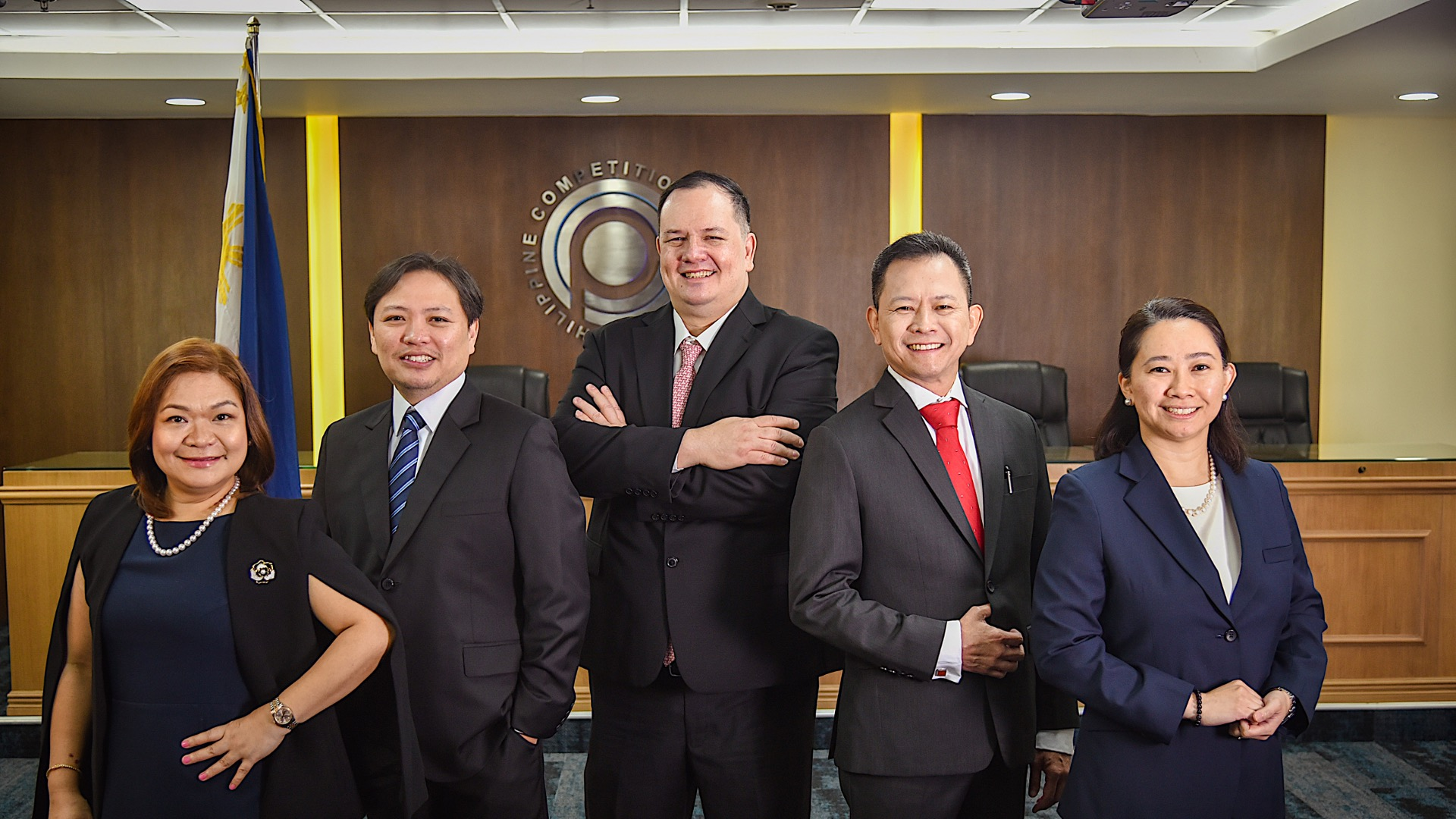
The Current Commission (as of 2026; photo from 2023; L to R: Medrano, Peloton, Aguinaldo, Negre, Querol)

=== Criticisms to the Current Composition of the Commission ===
Although not formally designated as such, Querol, holding an undergraduate degree in Economics and an MBA, effectively serves in a dual role as lawyer-economist, satisfying the requirement of the PCA that at least one member of the Commission should be an economists. However, critics highlight that none of the current commissioners possess advanced degrees in economics, a notable departure from previous compositions, such as when Balisacan and Quimbo were members of the commission.

== Organizational structure ==
The Philippine Competition Commission is composed of six (6) offices, with respective divisions under them. According to the Philippine Competition Commission website, each office has the following functions:

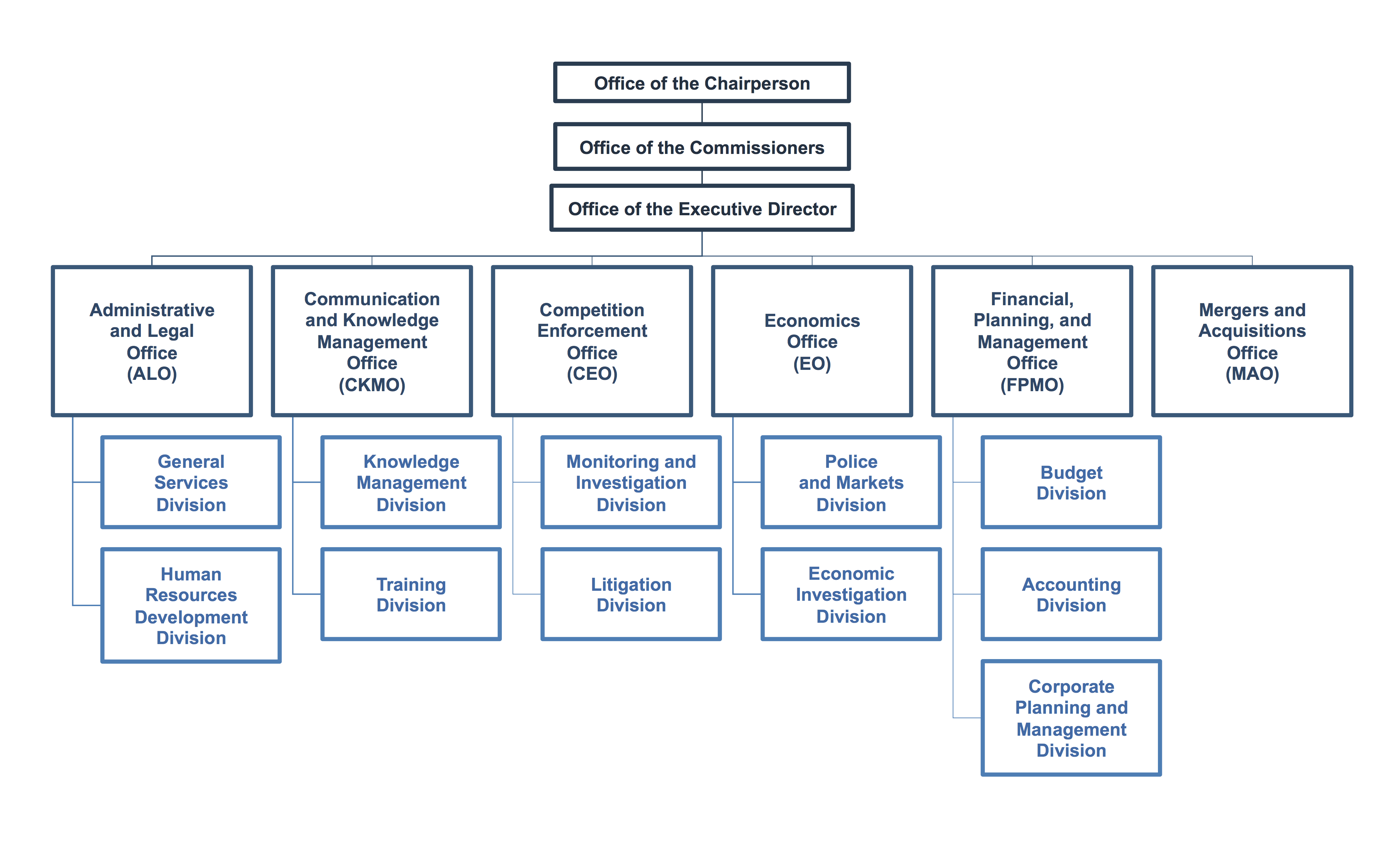
Organizational Hierarchy of the Philippine Competition Commission

=== Administrative (AO) ===
The Administrative Office (AO) is composed of three divisions, namely, the General Services Division, Human Resources Development Division, and the Information and Communications Technology Division. Its main function is to act as the commission's deliverer of key corporate services in the areas of human resource management, procurement, information technology, and administration.

=== Communication & Knowledge Management Office (CKMO) ===
The Communication & Knowledge Management (CKMO) consists of the Knowledge Management Division and the Training Division. It leads the commission's advocacy efforts to foster a culture of competition in the country, providing sustained support to improve the institutional and technical capacity of other PCC units. Its tasks are to identify areas of concern for the PCC, formulate strategies, execute programs, and create mechanisms to engage both its internal and external stakeholders. It also collaborates with relevant business groups, consumer associations, and statutory bodies to enhance awareness and understanding of the Philippine Competition Act.

=== Competition Enforcement Office (CEO) ===
The Competition Enforcement Office (CEO) is divided into the Monitoring and Investigation Division, and the Litigation Division. It is in charge of monitoring, prevention, detection, investigation, and prosecution of anti-competitive agreements or abuse of dominant position conduct that substantially restricts, prevents, or lessens competition, as generally provided under Sections 14 and 15 of the Philippine Competition Act. To effectively enforce procedural fairness, it utilizes technical experts, highly trained investigators, and experienced litigators, while tapping synergies within the PCC, such as the Economics Office and the Mergers and Acquisitions Office. It likewise espouses Leniency and Whistleblower Programs as avenues for businesses and market stakeholders to self-police its ranks and report anti-competitive conduct.

=== Economics Office (EO) ===
The Economics Office (EO) is organized between the Policy and Markets Division, and the Economic Investigation Division. Its task is to evaluate the impact of government policy on market competition and consumer welfare, and to provide economic analysis to support the detection and investigation of anti-competitive behavior. It handles cases led by the Mergers and Acquisitions Office or the Competition Enforcement Office, and supports the advocacy and knowledge management activities of the commission.

=== Finance, Planning, and Management Office (FPMO) ===
The Finance, Planning, and Management (FPMO) has three (3) divisions under it, namely: the Budget Division, the Accounting Division, and the Corporate Planning & Management Division. Its work centers on providing the commission with effective and efficient advice and technical assistance on areas of budget and finance, plans and programs, management matters, and other functions, as may be provided by law.

=== Mergers and Acquisitions Office (MAO) ===
The Mergers and Acquisitions Office reviews, investigates and evaluates mergers and acquisitions which are likely to substantially prevent, restrict, or lessen competition in the relevant market or in the market for goods or services. It receives notifications of proposed mergers and acquisitions that reach the threshold under the Implementing Rules and Regulations of the Philippine Competition Act, as well as cases referred to it by the commission for a motu proprio review. The Office works together with the Economic Office to investigate whether mergers and acquisitions are likely to result in a substantial lessening of competition in the market. Should it find that a merger or acquisition is likely to reduce competition and harm consumers through higher prices, lower quality of goods or services, or stifle innovation, it will submit a recommendation to the commission for the prohibition of the proposed transaction. It likewise develops guides for businesses on complying with antitrust laws through publication of Merger Guidelines, additional guidelines and clarificatory notes.

=== Office members ===
The PCC is also composed of an executive director and six directors, all of whom respectively head the offices of the commission. According to the PCA, it is the commission, namely the chairperson and the Commissioners, who shall appoint, and determine their status, qualifications, and duties. They, along with the other staff members of the commission, are required to possess at least a bachelor's degree in economics, finance, business administration management, commerce, marketing, accounting, law, engineering.

=== Current officials ===
Name	Position	Office
Atty. Michael Aguinaldo	Chairperson	Office of the Chairperson
Atty. Lolibeth Ramit-Medrano	Commissioner	Office of the Commissioner
Atty. Ferdinand M. Negre	Commissioner	Office of the Commissioner
Atty. Michael B. Peloton	Commissioner	Office of the Commissioner
Atty. Marah Victoria S. Querol	Commissioner	Office of the Commissioner
Kenneth V. Tanate, PhD	Executive Director	Office of the Executive Director
Jeson Q. de la Torre	Director	Administrative
Atty. Joseph Melvin B. Basas	Director	Finance, Planning, & Management
Atty. Lianne Ivy Medina	Director	Mergers & Acquisitions
Atty. Christian Loren B. de los Santos	Director	Competition Enforcement
Carlos L. Vega, PhD	Director	Economics
Frederick P. Romero, PhD	Director	Communications and Knowledge Management

=== List of chairpersons ===
No.	Chairperson		Term		
No.	Portrait	Name	Took office	Left office	Duration
1	Arsenio Balisacan	Arsenio Balisacan	January 27, 2016	June 30, 2022	6 years, 154 days
–	Johannes Bernabe	Johannes Bernabe; Acting	June 30, 2022	January 6, 2023	190 days
2	Michael G. Aguinaldo	Michael G. Aguinaldo	January 6, 2023	Incumbent	3 years, 313 days
