= Arsenio Balisacan =

Filipino economist, academic, and government official

Arsenio M. Balisacan
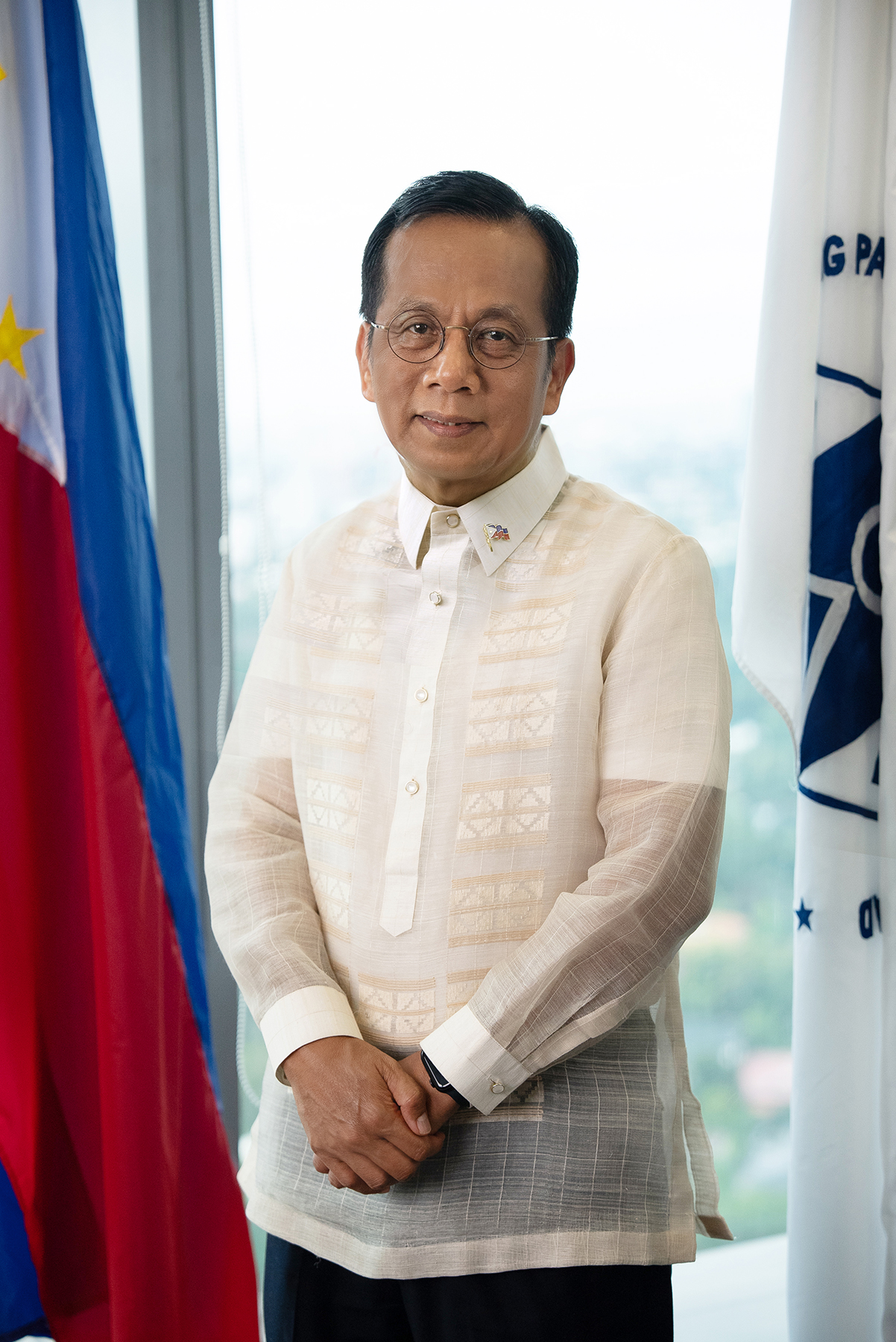
- Official portrait, 2025

1st Secretary of Economy, Planning, and Development
- Incumbent
- Assumed office April 10, 2025
- President: Bongbong Marcos
- Preceded by: Office established

13th and 16th Secretary of the National Economic and Development Authority
- In office June 30, 2022 – April 10, 2025
- President: Bongbong Marcos
- Preceded by: Karl Kendrick Chua
- Succeeded by: Office abolished, reorganized into Department of Economy, Planning, and Development
- In office May 10, 2012 – January 31, 2016
- President: Benigno Aquino III
- Preceded by: Cayetano Paderanga Jr.
- Succeeded by: Emmanuel Esguerra (OIC)

Chairperson of the Philippine Competition Commission
- In office February 1, 2016 – June 30, 2022
- President: Benigno Aquino III; Rodrigo Duterte
- Preceded by: Office created
- Succeeded by: Johannes Benjamin R. Bernabe (OIC)

9th Director of the Southeast Asian Regional Center for Graduate Study and Research in Agriculture
- In office 2003–2009
- Preceded by: Ruben L. Villareal
- Succeeded by: Gil C. Saguiguit Jr.

Personal details
- Born: Arsenio Molina Balisacan; November 8, 1957 (age 68) Solsona, Ilocos Norte, Philippines
- Education: Mariano Marcos State University (BS); University of the Philippines Los Baños (MS); University of Hawaii at Manoa (PhD)
- Occupation: Economist

Arsenio Molina Balisacan is a Filipino economist and academic who has served as the first secretary of economy, planning, and development, under President Bongbong Marcos since 2025. Balisacan headed his department's predecessor, the National Economic Development Authority (NEDA), from May 2012 to January 2016 under the Benigno Aquino III administration. He then served under the Duterte administration as the Chairperson of the Philippine Competition Commission from February 1, 2016, to June 30, 2022. He was again appointed as NEDA Secretary under the Bongbong Marcos administration. During his first term in 2012, he concurrently served as NEDA Secretary and as Chairman of the Boards of the Philippine Statistics Authority, Philippine Institute for Development Studies, Philippine Center for Economic Development, and Public-Private Partnership Center.

Prior to his Cabinet appointment, Balisacan served as both Professor and Dean of the School of Economics at the University of the Philippines Diliman (UP) while he was running the Philippine Center for Economic Development as its executive director. He additionally served as the Director-Chief Executive of the Southeast Asian Regional Center for Graduate Study and Research in Agriculture (SEARCA), during a period of secondment from the university.

Balisacan also served as a research fellow at the East-West Center in Honolulu and an economist at the World Bank in Washington, DC prior to joining the UP faculty in 1987. As a PhD in economics from the University of Hawaii at Manoa, Balisacan is an academician of the National Academy of Science and Technology (NAST) since 2008.

== Early years ==
Balisacan was born in Solsona, Ilocos Norte, a remote town located at the foot of the Cordillera mountain range in Luzon. His father initially worked as a farm tenant tilling fields in a resource-poor, isolated village of the town. When their nun relative convinced his father to take on a janitorial job in Laoag City, however, his family had to make the difficult choice of leaving their farm life behind. During their life in the city, Balisacan, his parents, and his five other siblings had were left with little choice but to settle down in a precarious area of land (where they were later on be evicted from). Balisacan recalled that it was during his high school years when their family was forced out of the property and forced to go back to their tiny village at the easternmost part of Ilocos Norte. “It was tough. It was only later on that I realized that we were an informal settler. We were squatting in somebody’s land. [When] I was already in high school, we were evicted from that place, and we had to return to that old town of ours,” Balisacan shared.

From his primary-school days all the way to his journey during post-graduate studies, Balisacan had to rely on scholarships, grants, and part-time employment for financial support while his family struggled. He spent most of his formative years of basic education under the tutelage of the Divine Word College of Laoag and completed the last two years of secondary education in Ablan Memorial Academy of Solsona where he graduated as the valedictorian. Balisacan credits his mother's aunt, Isidra Rivera, who was mayor of the town of Solsona, as his early inspiration in life. “She devoted her life selflessly to this town,” he says. “She had actually very little physical possessions in life, especially when viewed in today’s cadre of local politicians. What she had in abundance was deep respect and love by her people, unblemished credibility, and genuine concern for the poor.”

Just when their family began to experience more financial struggles, Balisacan's eldest brother graduated from Divine Word College, equipped with an Accounting degree. He was offered a job in Cebu City by Atlas Mining, which allowed him to uproot the family and bring them to settle down in Cebu. Balisacan, however, who was an Agriculture scholar at the Mariano Marcos State University (MMSU) at the time, was left to stay behind in Batac, Ilocos Norte.

Read more of his early years in these featured articles, "Arsenio M. Balisacan: Resolute at 25" by Cai Ordinario, Business Mirror Anniversary Issue and "Top Philippine Economist to Visit Hawaii" by Belinda Aquino, Hawaii Filipino Chronicle.

== Education ==
Balisacan received a B.S. degree in agriculture from the Mariano Marcos State University in 1979, graduating magna cum laude. Awarded a graduate scholarship by the Southeast Asian Regional Centre for Graduate Study and Research in Agriculture (SEARCA), he then took up a Master of Science (M.S.) degree in agricultural economics from the University of the Philippines Los Baños, from which he graduated in 1982. He received his Ph.D. in economics from the University of Hawaii at Manoa in 1985, with the dissertation "A positive theory of economic protection: Agricultural Policies in Developed and Developing Countries".

Balisacan received critical support from the East-West Center (EWC) while studying at the University of Hawaii. He served as research intern from July 1982 to May 1984 and was a Joint-Doctoral Research Intern from May 1984 to September 1985 under the Resource Systems Institute of EWC. Upon earning his PhD he served as a research fellow from October 1985 to March 1986.

Part of his pioneering PhD dissertation on the political economy of agricultural policy was later published in the Review of World Economics titled, "Public Choice of Economic Policy: The Growth of Agricultural Protection" in 1987.

He was named as one of the 100 outstanding alumni at the University of the Philippines Los Baños (UPLB), (College of Economics and Management) (CEM)'s centenary. He was conferred the 2016 Distinguished Alumni Award by the East-West Center (EWC) and East-West Center Alumni Association (EWCAA), the 2006 Distinguished Alumni Award by the UPLB Alumni Association, the 2005 Outstanding Alumni Award by the East-West Center Alumni Association Philippines, and the 2004 Most Distinguished Alumnus Award by the Mariano Marcos State University. In 2023, he received the Most Distinguished Alumnus award from the University of the Philippines Alumni Association (UPAA)—an award meant to honor iskos and iskas who have made outstanding contributions to positive change in the country.

== Professional career ==
=== Starting out as an economist ===
As Balisacan wrapped up his PhD studies at the University of Hawaii Manoa, he took up a post as a research fellow at the East-West Center in 1985–1986. He then moved to Washington D.C. in 1986 to serve as an economist for the World Bank.

=== Returning to the Philippines ===
He came back to the Philippines in 1987 and became an assistant professor of economics at the University of the Philippines Los Banos until 1988, when he moved to UP Diliman and joined the faculty of the University of the Philippines School of Economics, eventually receiving an academic appointment as full professor in 1995.

Balisacan was a recipient of various academic and professional awards. He was elected as academician to the National Academy of Science and Technology (NAST) of the Philippines in 2008. NAST is the country's peer-elected group of select individuals who have made outstanding contributions to science and technology.

As a highly respected academic, he held various positions in academic organizations and advisory groups locally and abroad. He was a member (2011–2015) of the board of academic advisors of the Chinese Center for Agricultural Policy at the Chinese Science Academy and president of the Asian Society of Agricultural Economists (2011–2014). He was chairman of the board of academic advisors of the Asian Institute of Management's Center for Bridging Societal Divides (August 2009 to 2012) and member of the policy advisory council of the Australian Centre for International Agricultural Research (June 2009 to May 2012). Balisacan also became president of the Philippine Economic Society – the national learned society for economists – in 2006.

He founded the Asian Journal of Agriculture and Development, an internationally refereed journal, and served as its editor in 2004–2015.

He also became an adjunct professor at the Australian National University in 2011–2015.

He is one of the most cited scholars in the Philippines with an h-index of 31 according to Google Scholar.

=== DA ===
Seconded from UP, he served as Undersecretary for Policy and Planning at the Philippine Department of Agriculture (DA) from 2000 to 2001, also serving as Officer-in-Charge at the Agricultural Credit and Policy Council. In this capacity, he served as the Philippine chief negotiator in the World Trade Organization (WTO) Agriculture Negotiations and in various bilateral agriculture negotiations. He returned to this position as Undersecretary for Policy and Planning at the Department of Agriculture for a brief stint in 2003.

=== SEARCA ===
Balisacan's abilities as an institution builder are most exemplified by what he has done to bring the Southeast Asian Regional Center for Graduate Study and Research in Agriculture (SEARCA), one of the centers of excellence of the Southeast Asian Ministers of Education Organization (SEAMEO), to new heights as it continues the journey for relevance and excellence as a development institution. Serving as the center's director and chief executive in 2003–2009, he restructured the institution to respond to the changing needs, demands, and priorities of its stakeholders, especially the need for institutional capacity-building in the region's less developed countries in the wake of globalization, environmental degradation, and global climate change. Sound financial management, coupled with innovative approaches to institutional partnerships to reach out to stakeholders, enabled the center not only to regain lost ground, but also to achieve a respectable level of financial sustainability. Indeed, the work and activities of SEARCA became visible again not only in the region it covers but also to the rest of the world. His accomplishments at SEARCA is summarized in his exit report titled, "Mainstreaming Agriculture in the Development Agenda"

=== UPSE ===
Back at UP, in 2010, Balisacan was appointed dean of the School of Economics at the University of the Philippines Diliman (UPSE). As dean, he concurrently served as executive director of the Philippine Center for Economic Development and chairman of the UPecon Foundation Inc.

=== NEDA ===
Balisacan held these academic posts until he was seconded from UP to the National Economic and Development Authority (NEDA) when Philippine President Benigno S. Aquino III asked him to serve as NEDA Director-General and, concurrently, Socioeconomic Planning Secretary. Aquino signed his appointment papers on May 10, 2012, and was confirmed by the bicameral Committee on Appointments of the Philippine Congress on February 6, 2013.

Secretary Balisacan was tasked to address the critical constraints that make economic growth slow, uneven, and exclusive to certain segments of the Philippine society.

Concurrent to his role in NEDA, he served as board chairman of the Philippine Institute for Development Studies and the Philippine Center for Economic Development; the first Governing Board Chairperson of the Public-Private Partnership Center of the Philippines; and the first board chairperson of the Philippine Statistics Authority (which combines the National Statistical Coordination Board, the National Statistics Office, the Department of Agriculture's Bureau of Agricultural Statistics, the Department of Labor and Employment's Bureau of Labor and Employment Statistics, and the Philippine Statistical Research Institute.)

At these key positions, Secretary Balisacan was able to influence policies, programs, and projects to facilitate inclusive economic growth, employment creation, and poverty reduction. He partly played a role in the recent remarkable performance of the Philippine economy. From 2010 to 2016, the seven-year average growth of the Philippine economy was 6.2 percent, the country's fastest in 40 years. Recognizing the importance of maintaining the momentum, he and his senior colleagues in government worked on crafting a forward-looking agenda, (Ambisyon Natin 2040), which articulated a vision for an inclusive and prosperous Philippines (See Foreword, Preface, and Chapter 1 of R. Clarete, E. Esguerra, and H. Hill, 2018, The Philippine Economy: No Longer the East Asian Exception?, Singapore: Institute of Southeast Asian Studies). Through (Executive Order No. 5), the next administration adopted the Ambisyon Natin 2040 as the long-term vision for the Philippines. The order resonates in the administration's medium-term development blueprint, the (Philippine Development Plan 2017-2022). Today, the Philippine economy remains one of the best-performing developing economies in Asia.

=== PCC ===
Following the passage of the Philippine Competition Act (PCA) by Congress in 2015, President Benigno S. Aquino III formed the Philippine Competition Commission (PCC) in January 2016, appointing Balisacan to serve as its first chairperson. PCC is an independent quasi-judicial body created to promote and protect market competition by prohibiting anti-competitive conduct and practices, including cartels and anti-competitive mergers. As the country's antitrust agency, PCC plays a key role in helping achieve a vibrant and inclusive economy and advancing consumer welfare.

Balisacan's effective leadership, combined with a competition act that gives the enforcer broad powers, has gotten the PCC off to a good start, placing the commission among the top emerging enforcers in developing countries only two years after its formation. Nonetheless, he faces formidable challenges as competition czar because the Philippines is cited as one of the most restrictive economies in the world (see Fostering Competition in the Philippines: The Challenge of Restrictive Regulation by the World Bank).

=== NEDA/DEPDev ===
On May 27, 2022, Balisacan accepted the offer to become Secretary of the National Economic Development Authority (NEDA) under the incoming administration of Bongbong Marcos, who was then the presumptive president. He took office on June 30, 2022. On April 10, 2025, NEDA was reorganized and renamed into Department of Economy, Planning and Development (DEPDev), making him the first secretary of the department.

== Personal life ==
Arsenio Balisacan is a long-distance runner. He has run the Sydney Marathon in 2025 , Berlin Marathon in 2024 , Vancouver Marathon in 2023 New York Marathon (virtually) in 2021, Paris Marathon in 2019, Chicago Marathon in October 2017 and in the Honolulu Marathon in 2012.

Political offices
Preceded by Cayetano Paderanga Jr.	Director-General of the National Economic and Development Authority; 2012–2014	Succeeded by Emmanuel Esguerra (OIC)
Preceded by Karl Kendrick Chua as Director-General of the National Economic and Development Authority	Secretary of Economy, Planning, and Development; 2022–present	Incumbent
Order of precedence
Preceded by Ambassadors of the Philippines (while at their posts)	Order of Precedence of the Philippines as Secretary of Economy, Planning, and Development	Succeeded by Dave Gomez as Secretary of the Presidential Communications Office
