= AmBisyon Natin 2040 =

Long-term development vision of the Philippine government

AmBisyon Natin 2040 (literally "Our Ambition 2040") is a 25-year long-term vision for the Philippines developed by the National Economic and Development Authority (NEDA) to guide development planning. The vision describes the aspirations of Filipinos for themselves and for the country in 2040 and serves as an anchor for development planning across successive administrations. The visioning process began in 2015 and included focus group discussions and a national survey. It was adopted by the Duterte administration through Executive Order No. 5, s. 2016.

In 2015, NEDA began the long-term visioning process to identify the aspirations, values, and principles of Filipinos. The process included national consultations, focus group discussions, technical studies, and a national survey. More than 300 citizens participated in focus group discussions and nearly 10,000 participated in the national survey.

The national survey examined the aspirations, values, and principles of Filipinos, including their views on the future of the country, standard of living, health, education, employment, urbanization, the economy, justice and governance, peace and security, and cultural diversity. The survey was conducted nationwide among respondents aged 15 to 50 from different income groups and used face-to-face interviews.

The survey found that 79% of respondents aspired to a simple and comfortable life, while 16.9% aspired to an affluent life and 3.9% to a life of the rich. The aspirations for a simple and comfortable life included having a medium-sized home, sufficient income for everyday needs, a vehicle, the ability to provide children with a college education, and the ability to take local vacations.

The resulting vision states that by 2040, the Philippines should be a prosperous, predominantly middle-class society where no one is poor, with people living long and healthy lives and being smart and innovative in a high-trust society. Executive Order No. 5 also established the goal of tripling real per capita incomes and eradicating hunger and poverty by 2040, if not sooner, and required the Philippine Development Plans through 2040 to be anchored on AmBisyon Natin 2040.

== See also ==
- Dutertenomics
