= Dutertenomics =

Catch-all term for the socioeconomic policies during Rodrigo Duterte's presidency

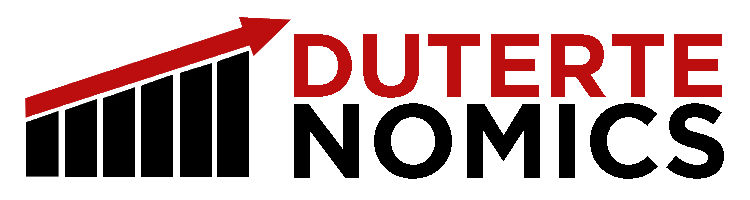
Dutertenomics logo

Dutertenomics is a catch-all term referring to the socioeconomic policies of Rodrigo Duterte, the 16th president of the Philippines. A significant part of these policies include the development of infrastructure and industries in the Philippines.

== Background ==
Finance Secretary Carlos Dominguez III has said that the government required what he describes as an "audacious" economic strategy in order for the Philippines to "catch up with its more vibrant neighbors" by 2022 and help it achieve high-income economy status within a generation. The term Dutertenomics was coined to describe the economic policy of the Duterte administration. The term also refers to the series of forums where Duterte's economic team pitches the administration's plan to help the country become a high-middle-income economy by 2022.

The policy was unveiled on April 18, 2017, by the Department of Finance and the Presidential Communications Operations Office (PCOO), in cooperation with the Center for Strategy, Enterprise and Intelligence (CenSEI) in a forum held at Conrad Manila in Pasay. A second forum was held on April 25, 2017.

Dutertenomics was also pitched abroad, particularly at the 2017 World Economic Forum on the Association of Southeast Asian Nations in Cambodia and at the sidelines of the 2017 One Belt One Road Forum for International Cooperation in Beijing, China.

== Ten-point agenda ==
The economics team of then President-elect Rodrigo Duterte presented the following points of Duterte's socioeconomic policy in a business forum in Davao in June 2016. Dutertenomics is anchored on these ten principles.

1. Continue and maintain current macroeconomic policies, including fiscal, monetary, and trade policies.
2. Institute progressive tax reform and more effective tax collection, indexing taxes to inflation.
3. Increase competitiveness and the ease of doing business.
4. Accelerate annual infrastructure spending to account for 5% of GDP, with Public-Private Partnerships playing a key role.
5. Promote rural and value chain development toward increasing agricultural and rural enterprise productivity and rural tourism.
6. Ensure security of land tenure to encourage investments, and address bottlenecks in land management and titling agencies.
7. Invest in human capital development, including health and education systems, and match skills and training.
8. Promote science, technology, and the creative arts to enhance innovation and creative capacity.
9. Improve social protection programs, including the government's Conditional Cash Transfer program.
10. Strengthen implementation of the Responsible Parenthood and Reproductive Health Law.

== Build! Build! Build! Program ==
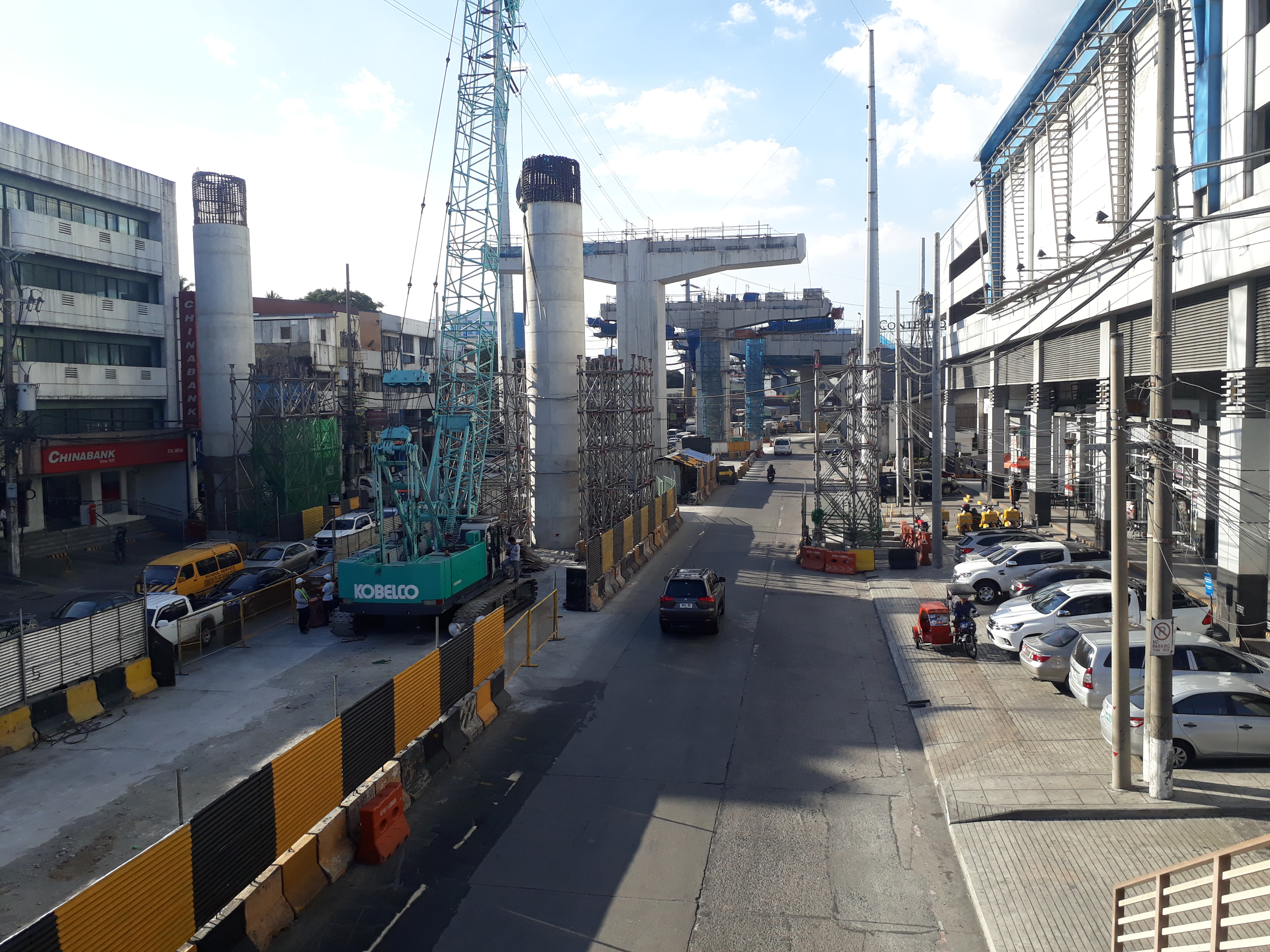
Skyway Stage 3 construction along G. Araneta, Quezon City

Part of Dutertenomics is the Build! Build! Build! Infrastructure Plan which according to the administration will usher in the "Golden Age of Infrastructure". The goals of the program are to reduce poverty, encourage economic growth and reduce congestion in Metro Manila. The program also involves the continuation of some projects under previous administrations.

In November 2019, the government revised its list of flagship infrastructure projects under Duterte's "Build, Build, Build" program, expanding it to 100. It was revised again in August 2020, bringing the total number of projects to 104, expanding its scope included health, information and communications technology, as well as water infrastructure projects to support the country's economic growth and recovery from the effects of the COVID-19 pandemic. As of September 11, 2020, 24 projects were still in the approval & planning stages, while 80 were under implementation.

As of July 2021, 214 airport projects, 451 commercial social and tourism port projects, 29,264 kilometres (18,184 mi) of roads, 5,950 bridges, 11,340 flood control projects, 11,340 evacuation centers, and 150,149 classrooms had been completed under the infrastructure program. The numbers cited include newly-built infrastructure, and projects involving the repair, rehabilitation, widening, and expansion of existing infrastructure.

== Economic trends ==
=== Economic outlook ===
In December 2017, government data revealed that the Philippines' output of nickel ore fell 16 percent in the third quarter from a year earlier, after the country, which is the world's top supplier of the metal, suspended some mines in a clampdown on environmental violations. Production dropped to 19.8 million tons in the nine months to September from 25.97 million tonnes a year ago, according to the data. According to Finance Secretary Carlos Dominguez, the "Philippine economy is delivering the performance we anticipated, notwithstanding the political noise and a significant terrorist event in Mindanao". Dominguez gave the assessment during the Banyan Tree Leadership Forum of the Center for Strategic and International Studies.

On March 31, 2018, the Financial Times reported that the export of the Philippines has continued its drastic drop for the fifth month in a row, while the Philippine Statistics Authority reported that the trade deficit of the country has widened to 47.6%, endangering further the country's local economies.

In October 2018, the World Bank downgraded the economic outlook of the Philippines for 2018, but expects it to remain strong. FMIC and UA&P expect the economy to improve in the second half of 2018. On October 24, the Philippines improved its ranking by 29 places in the Ease of Doing Business rankings.

On November 2, 2018, the Philippines slipped 11 places from the World Bank's Ease of Doing Business rankings. The Department of Finance is demanding a correction from the World Bank, citing the smaller data set used to assess the country's credit base.

=== Inflation rate ===
On July 5, 2018, the inflation rate of the country soared to 5.2%, its highest in 5 years. The inflation rate worsened the impacts of the government's new tax policy, increasing the price of all goods in the country.

In September 2018, the inflation rate of the country further increased to 6.7%, its highest in a decade. President Duterte blamed American president Donald Trump for the inflation increase. Opposition Senator Francis Pangilinan, however, pointed out that if the United States was to blame, then all countries in ASEAN should have been experiencing the same, and only the Philippines had a very high inflation rate in the entire region at that time. On September 21, 2018, Duterte signed Administrative Order No. 13, removing non-tariff barriers in the importation of agricultural products, to address soaring inflation rates.

According to ING, with food prices decreasing, the worst of the inflation crisis is over. Inflation decreased in November 2018, at 5.8 to 6.6 percent. BSP decreased its inflation forecast for 2019, after the passage of the rice tariffication bill.

Inflation stayed at 6.7 percent in October 2018, higher than expected. July 2019 was met with a 2.4% inflation rate. October 2019 received an 0.8% inflation rate, the lowest under Duterte. However, this increased to 2.5% by December 2019. and increased again to 2.7% by July 2020.

=== Income and employment ===
Prior to the COVID-19 pandemic, economic managers predicted the accession of the Philippine economy to upper-middle-income status by 2019, citing massive infrastructure spending and robust growth.

=== COVID-19 pandemic ===
Bangko Sentral ng Pilipinas (BSP) Governor Benjamin Diokno and then-NEDA Director-General Ernesto Pernia forecast that the Philippine economy would likely enter a recession in 2020 due to the effect of the pandemic. Diokno stated that, although the first quarter is likely to grow by 3% since the Luzon-wide enhanced community quarantine only took effect near the end of the quarter, the second and third quarters would likely experience contractions in economic growth.

The unemployment rate of the country continued to follow a downward trend since 2005, however, it reached a record-high 17.7% in April 2020, where 1 in every 5 persons in the labor force are unemployed, accounting to 7.3 million jobless Filipinos.

On the second quarter of 2020, the Philippine economy went into a recession for the first time in 29 years, where it shrank by 16.5%, which was one of the biggest falls in the Southeast Asian region. GDP fell by 9%. Seasonally adjusted GDP fell by 15.2 percent in the second quarter from the first three months of the year.

The government expects an economic rebound by 2021, driven in part by the BBB infrastructure program.

== See also ==
- Abenomics
- AmBisyon Natin 2040
- Metro Manila Dream Plan
- Philippines 2000
