= Commission on Population and Development (Philippines) =

Philippine government agency leading population management

- Komisyon sa Populasyon at Pagpapaunlad
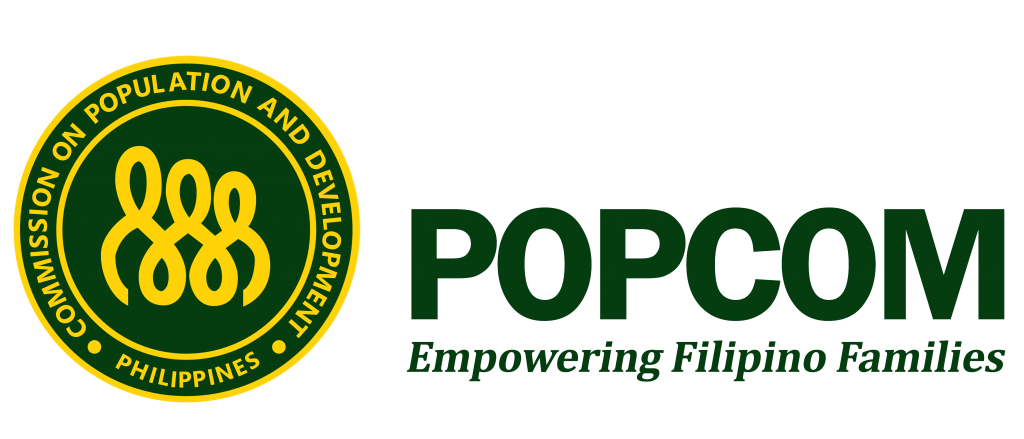
- Seal

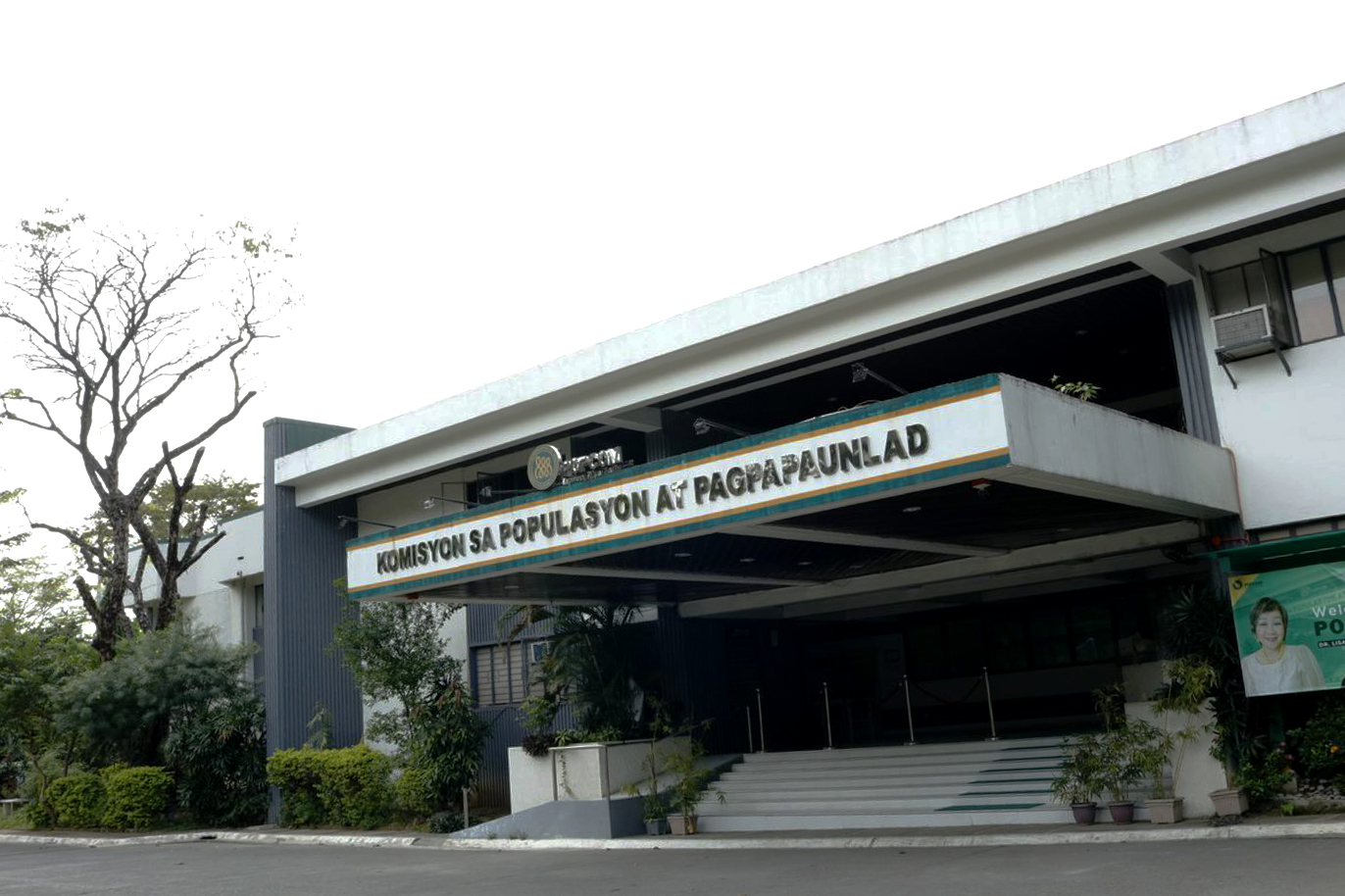
- CPD Central Office Building

Agency overview
- Formed: 19 February 1969
- Headquarters: Welfareville, Mandaluyong, Metro Manila, Philippines
- Motto: Empowering Filipino families and communities.
- Employees: 290 (2024)
- Website: https://cpd.gov.ph

The Commission on Population and Development (CPD; Filipino: Komisyon sa Populasyon at Pagpapaunlad), formerly known and abbreviated as POPCOM, is a Philippine government agency and the lead policy-making and coordinating organization of the country's population management programs.

The CPD is an attached agency to the Department of Economy, Planning, and Development (DEPDev), whose secretary serves as the commission's chairperson of the board.

As of January 13, 2023, CPD's executive director is Lisa Bersales, who is also the undersecretary for population and development (POPDEV).

== History ==
The agency, then known as POPCOM, was created in 1969 by virtue of Executive Order (EO) 171 which established a 22-member Commission on Population.

Republic Act 6365, or the Population Act of the Philippines, was enacted into law by the Philippine Congress on August 16, 1971, which established the National Population Policy. The agency was mandated in 1972 by Presidential Decree 79, or the Revised Population Act of the Philippines, to be the central policy-making, planning, coordinating and monitoring agency for the Philippine Population Management Program (PPMP).

Before the actual creation of POPCOM, then-president of the Philippines Ferdinand Marcos, together with 17 other heads of state, signed in December 1967 the United Nations Declaration on Population, which stated: “The population problem must be recognized as a principal element in long-range planning if governments are to achieve their economic goals and fulfill the aspirations of their people."

In 1970 the Ad Hoc Commission on Population, created the year prior, recommended the launch of the National Population Program through EO 233.

Toward the next decade, POPCOM was listed as an attached agency to the Department of Social Welfare and Development by virtue of EO 123 in 1986.

In 1990, EO 48, as directed by then-chief executive Corazon Aquino, placed POPCOM under the Office of the President in order to “facilitate coordination of policies and programs relative to population.” The following year, EO 476 made POPCOM an attached agency of the NEDA.

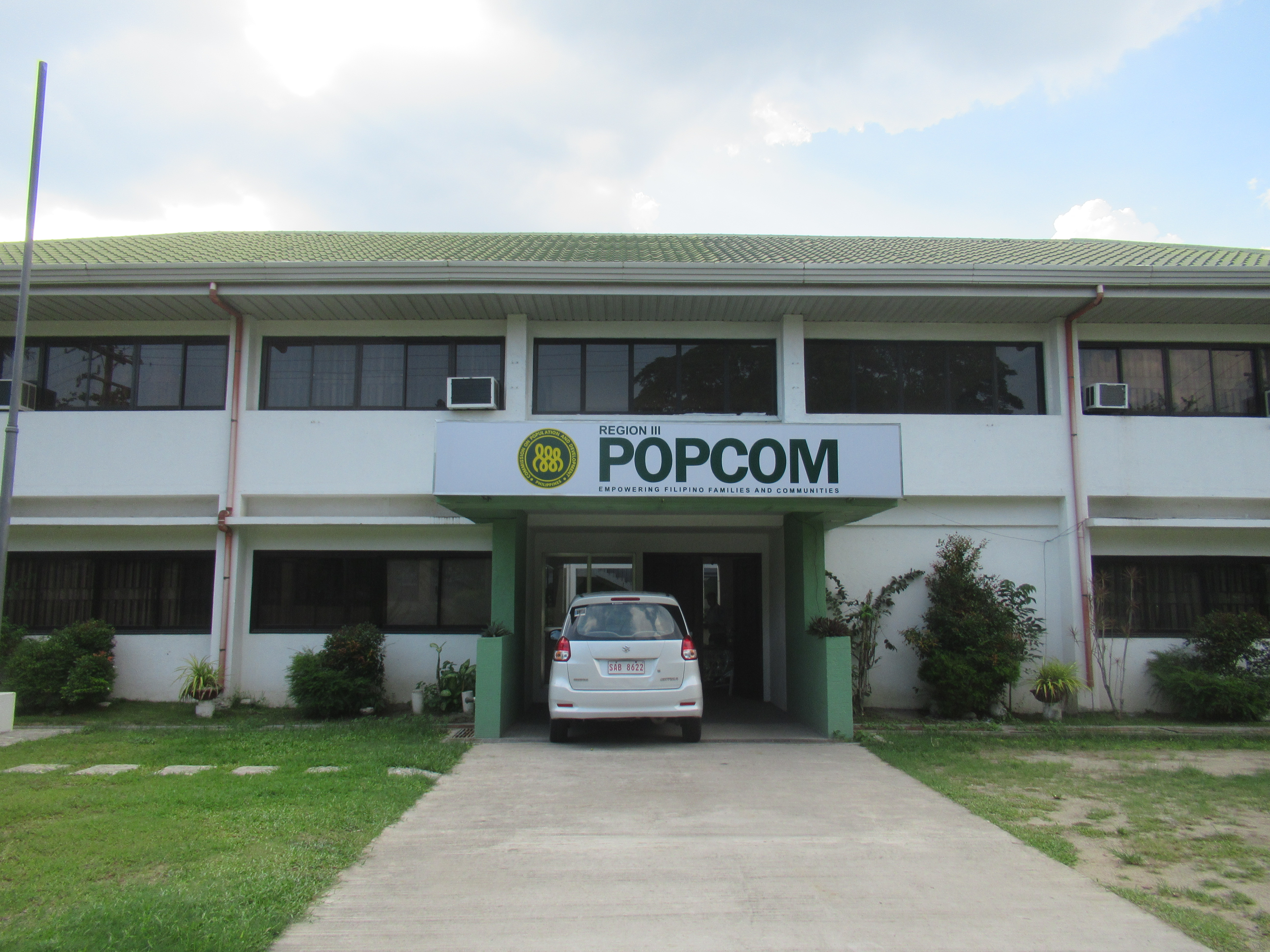
POPCOM in San Fernando, Pampanga

In 1993, POPCOM adopted the PPMP, as well as the Population, Resources and Environment Framework by the administration of ex-Philippine president Fidel V. Ramos. The regime of then-Philippine president Joseph Estrada reformulated the PPMP, with responsible parenthood as its cornerstone.

In 2003, then-president Gloria Macapagal Arroyo issued EO 188, which transferred POPCOM under the Department of Health (DOH). Under her administration, Arroyo joined the community of nations in expressing support for the International Conference on Population and Development, or ICPD. The statement reiterated the four principles that guide the Philippine government in the implementation of its population program: responsible parenthood, respect for life, birth spacing and informed choices. Health services, including those for reproductive health, were devolved by the Local Government Code to the local government units (LGUs).

On December 13, 2018, former Philippine president Rodrigo Duterte signed Executive Order No. 71. Section 1 of the said law orders the commission's reattachment to NEDA for policy and program direction, as well as renames it as the "Commission on Population and Development."

In mid-2023, the agency's Board of Directors approved its rebranding to the proper and appropriate acronym: "CPD." According to Bersales, the change in shortened name captures the commission's focus on "human capital development" which complements its core functions of reproductive health, responsible parenthood and family planning.

== Programs and projects ==
=== Responsible Parenthood and Family Planning (RPFP) ===
CPD's RPFP strategies are geared toward assisting couples to achieve their desired number and spacing of children within the demand of responsible parenthood through effective family planning. They aim to attain zero unmet need for modern family planning through increased access to family planning information and services.

Aside from exercising responsible parenting, CPD would like to help couples and parents contribute in maternal, neonatal and child health, and nutrition (MNCHN).

==== Constitutional bases ====
RPFP relies on the 1987 Philippine Constitution as its basis, especially in the following:

Article XV, Section 3.1 - “The State shall defend the right of the spouses to found a family in accordance with their religious convictions and the demands of responsible parenthood.”

Article II, Section 12 - “The State recognizes the sanctity of family life and shall protect and strengthen the family as a basic autonomous social institution. It shall protect the life of the mother and the life of the unborn from conception. The natural and primary duty of parents in the rearing of the youth for civic efficiency and development of moral character shall receive the support of the Government.”

=== Adolescent Health and Development (AHD) ===
As the government agency tasked to manage the Philippines's AHD program, CPD's overall goal is to contribute to the prevention of early and repeated pregnancies among Filipino youth.

CPD works closely with other stakeholders in linking demand generation and service delivery for Filipino adolescents. With concerted efforts, necessary services and information crucial to the development of the total well-being of young people will be made available wherever they are: at homes, schools, churches and in their communities.

=== POPDEV Integration ===
As a population management strategy, POPDEV integration is defined as the explicit consideration and integration of population dynamics and dimensions in the critical steps of any development initiative, such as plan and program development, policy formulation, database management and utilization, and other efforts that aim to improve, in a sustainable manner, the development conditions of the people and the localities where they live.

The strategy seeks, in the long term, to empower institutions to create an enabling environment for people to achieve their development goals through a well-managed population. Having such means the achievement of population processes and outcomes that are consistent with, complementary to, and facilitative of socioeconomic and human development. It is about making a connection between population factors and development initiatives to ensure integrated and sustainable development. Explicitly integrating population into economic and development strategies will hasten the pace of sustainable development and poverty alleviation, thus contributing to the achievement of population objectives and an improved quality of life of the populace.

POPDEV integration strategies will be pursued toward realizing population outcomes facilitative of sustainable socioeconomic and human development. It aims to integrate population dynamics and variables in development initiatives such as policy, plan, and program formulation.

== Philippine Population and Development Program (PPDP) ==
=== Policy principles ===
1. The central idea of the program is responsible parenthood. It is oriented toward the overall improvement of family well-being; it is not concerned with just fertility reduction. It views family welfare, including that of the individual, as the central objective of the national development program. Thus, the program promotes family development and responsible parenting. It believes that parenting and raising a family is a shared responsibility of the husband and the wife.
2. The program is non-coercive. It respects the rights of couples to determine the size of their family, and choose voluntarily the means to do so in accordance with their moral convictions and religious beliefs, as well as cultural mores and norms. It believes in informed choices.
3. The program rejects abortion as a means to control fertility. Abortion is illegal, and the program will never consider it as a family planning method. (See also: Abortion in the Philippines)
4. The program promotes self-reliance and multi-sectoral participation. It gives priority to projects that are self-sustaining and with community participation. It encourages coordinative and participative approaches through the participation of local government units (LGUs), non-government organizations (NGOs) and other key stakeholders.
5. The program adheres to gender equality and equity which is non-discriminatory in all political, social, and economic development concerns.
