= Philippine National Volunteer Service Coordinating Agency =

State agency of the Philippines

- Pambansang Kawanian para sa Koordinasyon ng Serbisyong Boluntaryo ng Pilipinas

Agency overview
- Formed: December 17, 1964; 61 years ago
- Jurisdiction: Philippines
- Headquarters: Ground Floor Philippine Sugar Center Building, North Avenue, Diliman, Quezon City, Philippines
- Agency executive: Donald James Gawe, Executive director
- Parent department: Department of Economy, Planning, and Development
- Website: www.pnvca.gov.ph

The Philippine National Volunteer Service Coordinating Agency (PNVCA; Filipino: Pambansang Kawanian para sa Koordinasyon ng Serbisyong Boluntaryo ng Pilipinas) is a government agency mandated to promote and coordinate all volunteer programs and services in the Philippines. The agency operates under the administrative supervision of the Department of Economy, Planning, and Development (DEPDev).

The agency leads the advocacy for volunteerism as a tool for socio-economic development. The agency converges different volunteering efforts to align with national priorities. The agency collaborates with government institutions and non-government organizations to assist marginalized sectors across the country. Academic institutions and corporate groups also form a significant part of the partnership network maintained by the agency. The headquarters of the agency is located at the Philippine Sugar Center Building in Diliman, Quezon City.

== History ==
The institutionalization of volunteer service in the Philippines traces its origins to international diplomatic commitments made in the early 1960s. The Philippine government pledged its commitment to adopt volunteerism as a tool for socio-economic development during the International Middle Level Manpower Conference held in Puerto Rico in 1962.

President Diosdado Macapagal signed Executive Order No. 134 on December 17, 1964 to fulfill this international commitment. Executive Order 134 formally created the Philippine National Volunteer Service Committee. The committee acted as the national liaison with the International Secretariat for Volunteer Service. The body recommended measures for promoting economic cooperation through participation in international volunteer programs.

The committee underwent several reorganizations over the subsequent decades to reflect changing administrative priorities. President Ferdinand Marcos issued Executive Order No. 105 on December 11, 1967 to reorganize the committee. This directive moved the leadership to the Office of the Presidential Arm on Community Development. The order authorized the organization of a Secretariat and an Asian Regional Office in Manila. The government shifted the leadership again when President Marcos issued Executive Order No. 320 on May 31, 1971. This order designated the Secretary of Social Welfare as the Chairman of the committee. This structural change highlighted a temporary policy shift viewing volunteerism primarily as a social welfare mechanism rather than a broader economic development tool.

The committee became an office known as the Philippine National Volunteer Service Coordinating Office in 1973. The evolution from a committee to a coordinating office granted the body more permanent administrative functions. President Marcos subsequently issued Executive Order No. 635 on December 12, 1980 to amend previous directives. This order officially renamed the office to the Philippine National Volunteer Service Coordinating Agency. The 1980 executive order placed the agency under the close administrative supervision of the Presidential Executive Assistant within the Office of the President. The government issued Executive Order No. 708 on July 17, 1981 to attach the agency to the National Economic and Development Authority. The attachment to the national economic planning body marked a policy recognition that volunteer service represents a quantifiable resource for rural development and national progress.

== Legal mandate ==
The legal framework governing the agency relies on several distinct executive and legislative instruments enacted over fifty years. Executive Order No. 635 establishes the foundational operational mandate for the agency. The statute mandates the agency to formulate policies and guidelines concerning volunteer service plans. The agency must coordinate the activities of all domestic and foreign governmental and private voluntary organizations. The agency ensures that these external services fit into the total national development goals. The legal instrument also designates the agency as the central clearinghouse for all matters pertaining to volunteer service.

Executive Order No. 635 imposes strict regulatory controls over foreign volunteer service workers entering the country. The law prohibits the admission of any foreign volunteer service worker unless the sending foreign country or foreign private organization has entered into a formal agreement with the Philippine government. All volunteer organizations and workers must register with the agency before performing any service in any place in the country. The registration statement requires extensive documentation. The documentation includes copies of contracts and full statements of terms and conditions. The registration must contain detailed descriptions of every activity the registrant intends to perform.

The 1980 directive explicitly prohibits foreign volunteer workers from engaging in any political activities within the Philippines. Foreign volunteers cannot make direct or indirect contributions of money or items of value in connection with any convention or political selection process. The statute subjects domestic volunteer workers who violate these provisions to charges before domestic courts.

Republic Act No. 9418, also known as the Volunteer Act of 2007 serves as the modern legislative backbone for the agency. It aims to institutionalize volunteerism as a strategy for rural development. It also establishes a national policy to promote the participation of various societal sectors in public and civic affairs. The law explicitly tasks the agency to review and formulate policies concerning the national volunteer service program consistent with national development priorities.

Republic Act No. 9418 expands the mandate of the agency to include the development of volunteering prototypes and models for adoption by institutions and communities. The agency must provide technical services and support for the capacity building of volunteers and volunteer organizations. The legal mandate requires the agency to establish and maintain a national network of volunteer organizations. The agency acts as a liaison with the United Nations Volunteers program under this law. The agency holds the legal responsibility to administer all funds from all sources in strict accordance with national accounting and auditing requirements.

== Governance structure and administration ==
The organizational architecture of the agency reflects its dual role as a policy-making body and an operational coordinating office. The agency functions as an attached agency of the Department of Economy, Planning, and Development for purposes of policy coordination and administrative supervision.

An Executive Director heads the agency and holds the authority to appoint professional staff and employees in accordance with civil service rules. The Executive Director implements the plans of the Philippine Volunteer Service Program and provides consultative services to various government and private agencies. The agency structure includes several specialized divisions. The Policy Advocacy and Technical Services Division handles training and conceptual development. The Administrative and Finance Division handles internal operations. The Program Coordination Partnership Monitoring and Evaluation Division tracks the deployment of volunteers.

=== Multi-sectoral advisory body ===
Executive Order No. 635 mandated the creation of a Multi-sectoral advisory body to encourage the widest participation of both government and non-government organizations in volunteer service. Republic Act No. 9418 formalized the membership of this advisory body to ensure comprehensive representation. The body assists the agency in policy review and formulation25. The body provides technical advisory services on volunteer matters and strengthens linkages among volunteer groups.

The members of the advisory body include the Department of Economy, Planning, and Development, Department of Education, Department of Foreign Affairs, Department of Justice, Department of the Interior and Local Government, Department of Social Welfare and Development, Commission on Higher Education and the Presidential Management Staff. The law requires government agencies to send representatives holding at least the rank of Assistant Secretary.

The advisory body also includes private sector representatives from the corporate and academic sectors. Private sector agencies must send their highest executive officers to serve on the body. The private sector representatives serve a two-year term. The body can extend this service for an additional term not exceeding four years total. The agency issues public calls for nominations to fill these private sector positions. Nominees must represent a bonafide Filipino organization with nationwide geographic coverage and network.

== Services offered and core programs ==
The agency executes its legal mandate through several structured programs designed to mobilize citizens and integrate foreign expertise into local development projects. The programs target different sectors including government employees marginalized communities and international technical experts.

=== Bayanihang Bayan Program ===
President Gloria Macapagal-Arroyo issued Memorandum Order No. 45 on December 7, 2001 to direct the implementation of a national government volunteer program. The directive established the Bayanihang Bayan Program for Government Service. The program creates a formal platform to engage the volunteer assistance of the private sector in the implementation of government programs and projects. The memorandum required all government agencies and instrumentalities to institutionalize the program by setting up specific Bayanihang Bayan Desks.

The agency collaborates with major government departments to implement this framework. The Department of Social Welfare and Development utilizes the Bayanihang Bayan Program to mobilize private citizens during disaster response operations. Volunteers assist in repacking food packs and loading relief goods. Volunteers also help deliver social protection programs directly to affected communities. The structured nature of the program allows government agencies to channel the energy of citizens into organized administrative and relief efforts without violating public sector employment regulations.

=== Volunteers for information and development assistance ===
The Volunteers for Information and Development Assistance program represents the community-based volunteering model of the agency. The agency launched this initiative in 1979 in partnership with the then Ministry of Human Settlements. The program originally provided opportunities for young people living in social housing projects to accelerate development activities in their immediate communities. The framework evolved to deploy unemployed college graduates and local residents as community organizers trainers and service providers. The program covers diverse sectors such as sustainable agriculture livelihood education health and environmental protection.

The program requires volunteers to serve in the specific communities where they live. The agency supports these local volunteers with a modest monthly living allowance and provides health and life insurance coverage. The local partner institutions hosting the volunteers frequently provide counterpart support through additional meal and transportation allowances. The program integrates with peace-building initiatives in conflict-affected regions. The agency partnered with a multi-donor program to recognize former Moro National Liberation Front combatants as Peace and Development Advocates under the program framework. These advocates facilitate community organizing and area development planning at the barangay level to sustain economic enterprises in Peace and Development Communities.

=== International volunteer service program ===
The agency coordinates the deployment of international volunteers through partnerships with foreign governments and international non-profit organizations. The agency manages the placement of volunteers from organizations such as the United States Peace Corps, France Volontaires, Deutsche Gesellschaft für Internationale Zusammenarbeit, Korea Overseas Volunteers, the Australian Volunteers Program and the Japan Overseas Cooperation Volunteers. The agency ensures that the technical assistance provided by these foreign nationals aligns with local development gaps. The coordination process involves assessing requests from local government units and state universities before approving the deployment of foreign technical experts to specific regions.. The agency takes responsibility for ensuring the safety of the international volunteers and maximizing the economic benefits of their technology transfer.

=== Search for Outstanding Volunteers program ===
The agency spearheads the recognition of exemplary volunteer service through the Search for Outstanding Volunteers program. The program serves a highlight activity of the National Volunteer Month observed every December pursuant to Presidential Proclamation No. 55 series of 1998. The agency created the awards program in 2001 to confer national recognition upon youth adults and organizations from the non-profit and corporate sectors.

The nomination process imposes strict eligibility criteria. The youth category covers Filipino citizens aged 15 to 30 years old. The adult category covers individuals aged 31 years old and above. Youth nominees must have provided volunteer assistance consistently for at least three years at the time of submission. Adult nominees must have provided volunteer assistance consistently for at least five years. Nominees must not possess any criminal convictions or offenses involving moral turpitude.

Nominated organizations fall under non-profit and corporate categories. Non-profit organizations must demonstrate five years of consistent volunteer assistance. Corporate organizations need only three years of consistent volunteer assistance to qualify. The agencys must possess registration with the Securities and Exchange Commission or another recognized accrediting government institution. Organizations must not have any derogatory reports from government agencies or final adverse court decisions involving fraud.

The Volunteer Lifetime Achievement Award serves as the highest recognition under this program. An individual must have engaged in consistent volunteering activities for at least twenty-five years to qualify for the lifetime achievement award. The lifetime award nominee must be a recipient of previous local or international volunteerism awards. The agency established Regional Search Committees to process all nominations and conduct initial evaluations of documentary evidence before submitting finalists for national deliberation.

== Milestones ==
=== Mainstreaming volunteerism in higher education ===
The agency actively pursues the integration of volunteerism into the academic and extension programs of higher education institutions. The agency signs formal Memoranda of Understanding with various State Universities and Colleges to establish Volunteerism Learning Hubs. The agency partnered with Rizal Technological University to implement capacity-building initiatives and research efforts that evaluate the impact of student and faculty volunteerism on community service.

The agency established similar agreements with Central Mindanao University, Capiz State University and the University of Southern Mindanao. These partnerships facilitate the creation of academic modules on volunteerism. The programs mobilize students enrolled in the National Service Training Program to participate in community development activities. The agency leverages these academic partnerships to conduct Volunteerism Promotion caravans that build a culture of civic responsibility among the youth.

=== Finance sector ===
The agency expanded its advocacy efforts to the banking and finance sector to promote employee-driven volunteer programs. The agency initiated collaborative discussions with the Land Bank of the Philippines and the Bangko Sentral ng Pilipinas to develop volunteerism initiatives within financial institutions. The agency incorporated the Land Bank into its National Volunteerism Resource Pool to maximize the best practices of the bank in volunteer program implementation. The Bangko Sentral ng Pilipinas committed to assisting the agency in connecting with rural and cooperative banks. The banking regulator works to include volunteerism modules in human resource development programs for newly onboarded bank employees. This integration demonstrates the success of the agency in positioning volunteerism as a core component of corporate social responsibility in heavily regulated industries.

=== Inter-agency partnerships for public welfare ===
The agency collaborates with various government bodies to address specialized public welfare issues through volunteerism. The agency signed a memorandum of understanding with the Bureau of Jail Management and Penology to promote volunteer participation in the safekeeping and rehabilitation of persons deprived of liberty. This partnership mainstreams volunteerism as a tool for community reintegration and mobilizes civil society organizations to contribute to jail-based development programs. The agency also partners with the Metro Manila Development Authority to incorporate volunteer waste collectors and coordinators into the Results-Based Incentive Program for solid waste minimization in waterways. These inter-agency partnerships demonstrate the capacity of the agency to adapt volunteer resources to diverse operational environments.

== Structural challenges ==
The execution of the national volunteer service mandate faces specific structural challenges and data limitations that occasionally draw scrutiny from international development observers and national audit institutions.

=== Statistical data gaps and economic valuation ===
The United Nations Volunteers program published an assessment regarding the measurement of volunteer work in the Philippines. The report highlighted significant statistical anomalies. The international report noted a severe lack of information on volunteerism despite the presence of the agency. The absence of systematic data prevents the government from producing a reliable measure of the economic contribution of volunteer service.

The national accounts only record volunteer work that leads to the production of goods or services for market enterprises or non-profit enterprises operating in the market. This statistical framework left out volunteer services produced for households or non-market non-profit enterprises. An individual providing volunteer services to a public community school remains unrecorded in employment statistics under this system. The exact same activity performed for a private fee-paying school receives statistical recognition. The report concluded that the failure to capture this data limits the ability of the government to optimize the use of volunteer human resources in economic planning.

=== Programmatic resource constraints ===
Public policy analysts occasionally criticize the scale of the local deployment programs relative to the national population. Observers note that programs like Volunteers for Information and Development Assistance remain highly limited due to budgetary constraints.. The program supports a relatively small number of local volunteers despite the presence of hundreds of thousands of unemployed college graduates who could serve as development workers. The modest financial allowances provided to volunteers require substantial counterpart funding from local partner institutions. The local partner institutions often lack the resources to host volunteers effectively. The inability to scale these programs into a massive national development volunteer system limits the potential impact of the agency on national unemployment and rural poverty reduction.

=== Administrative complexities ===
The agency operates within a complex administrative environment that requires strict adherence to procurement and human resource regulations. The role of the agency as a coordinating body means its operational success depends entirely on the compliance of its partner institutions. The agency is mandated to continuously manage the legal boundaries defined by Executive Order No. 635 and Republic Act No. 9418. Though the agency must ensure that deployed volunteers do not replace regular employees or engage in prohibited political activities, the reliance on host organizations to submit timely availment reports and end-of-assignment documentation created constant administrative friction.

The execution of Executive Order No. 635 imposes strict regulatory controls over foreign volunteer service workers that can complicate international deployments. It prohibits the admission of any foreign volunteer service worker without a formal agreement between the sending foreign country and the Philippine government. The 1980 directive explicitly prohibits foreign volunteer workers from engaging in any political activities within the Philippines. Foreign volunteers cannot make direct or indirect contributions of money or items of value in connection with any convention or political selection process. Foreign workers face immediate restrictions regarding political solicitation. Domestic volunteer workers who violate these specific registration and political provisions face formal charges before domestic courts. These strict regulatory frameworks demand constant vigilance from the agency to ensure international diplomatic incidents do not arise from unauthorized volunteer activities.
