= Ernesto Pernia =

Filipino economist

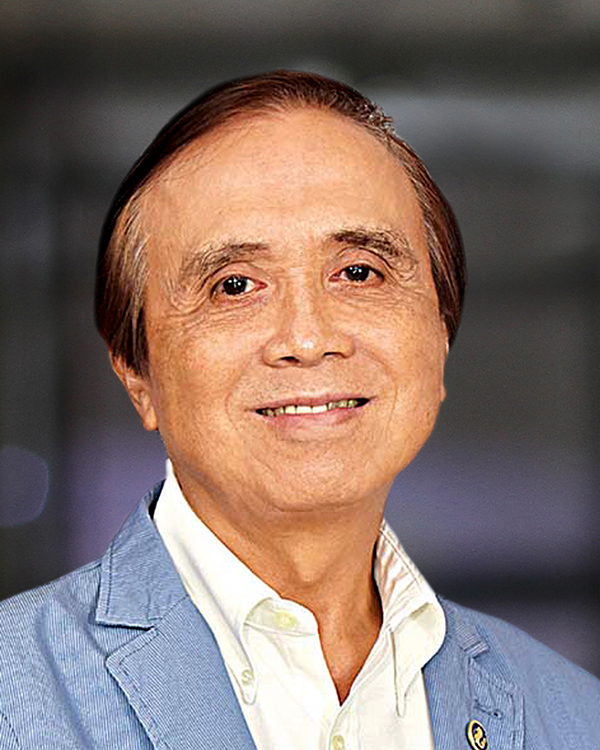

14th Director-General of the National Economic and Development Authority Concurrently Secretary of Socioeconomic Planning
- In office June 30, 2016 – April 16, 2020
- President: Rodrigo Duterte
- Preceded by: Emmanuel Esguerra (acting)
- Succeeded by: Karl Kendrick Chua

Personal details
- Born: Ernesto del Mar Pernia; December 30, 1943 (age 82) Tubigon, Bohol, Philippines
- Spouse: Elena E. Pernia
- Education: University of San Carlos (AB); University of Bridgeport (MA); University of California, Berkeley (Ph.D)
- Occupation: Professor, Writer
- Profession: Economist

Ernesto del Mar Pernia (born December 30, 1943) is a Filipino economist, writer and professor emeritus at the University of the Philippines School of Economics. He formerly served as Director-General of the National Economic and Development Authority and Secretary of Socioeconomic Planning under the Duterte administration from 2016 to 2020.

== Early life and education ==
A native of Bohol, Pernia was born in the municipality of Tubigon on December 30, 1943. He is the sixth of nine children born to Dr. Juan C. Pernia, a dentist, and Petra del Mar. Pernia attended the San Carlos Major Seminary in Cebu City where he graduated magna cum laude with a bachelor's degree in Philosophy in 1963. While pursuing a second degree at the University of San Carlos, he worked as a part-time instructor in the university. He eventually completed his AB Economics in 1967.

For his master's degree, Pernia moved to Connecticut, U.S. and attended the University of Bridgeport under a Graduate Assistantship grant. He earned his MA Economics in 1969. He was then awarded a Ford Fellowship to University of California, Berkeley, where he obtained his Ph.D. in Economic Demography. He completed his dissertation, "Urbanization, population growth, and development in the Philippines", under the supervision of Kingsley Davis and Michael Wiseman in 1976.

== Professional career ==
Pernia worked in the U.S. after completing his doctorate degree at UC Berkeley. He was a lecturer at the University of California, Santa Cruz while also taking up a research grant at the Smithsonian Institution. He was also a fellow of the East-West Population Institute in Honolulu.

On his return to the Philippines, he joined the University of the Philippines Diliman (UP) as director of the Institute of Economic Development & Research of the UP School of Economics in 1977 and as chairman of the UP Department of Economics in 1978. From 1984 to 1986, he served as the regional adviser on population and employment policy and research of the International Labour Organization regional office in Bangkok, Thailand.

He then joined the Asian Development Bank (ADB) in 1986. From being the bank's senior economist in 1990, he worked his way up to being the head of the ADB Knowledge Dissemination Unit in 1999, managing editor of the Asian Development Review, and as lead economist in 2003.

Throughout his long career as an economist, Pernia also consulted for the World Bank, the Population Council East and South Asia Regional Office, the United Nations University, the United Nations Center for Regional Development, the Food and Agriculture Organization, the Philippine Institute for Development Studies, and USAid.

Pernia is a recipient of the "Outstanding Young Scientist Award for Social Science" from the National Academy of Science and Technology in 1980. In February 2015, the Philippine American Academy of Science and engineering (PASSE) awarded him with the Leadership in Science and Economics for his excellence in policy researches and publications of social sciences, economics and technology in national development.

In June 2016, Pernia was appointed by President Duterte as the Director-General of NEDA, making him the Socioeconomic Planning Secretary and a member of the Cabinet. In April 2020, he resigned from his position and was succeeded by Karl Kendrick Chua.

Political offices
Preceded by Emmanuel Esguerra; Acting	Director-General of the National Economic and Development Authority; 2016–2020	Succeeded by Karl Kendrick Chua
