= Philippines 2000 =

Socio-economic program in the Philippines

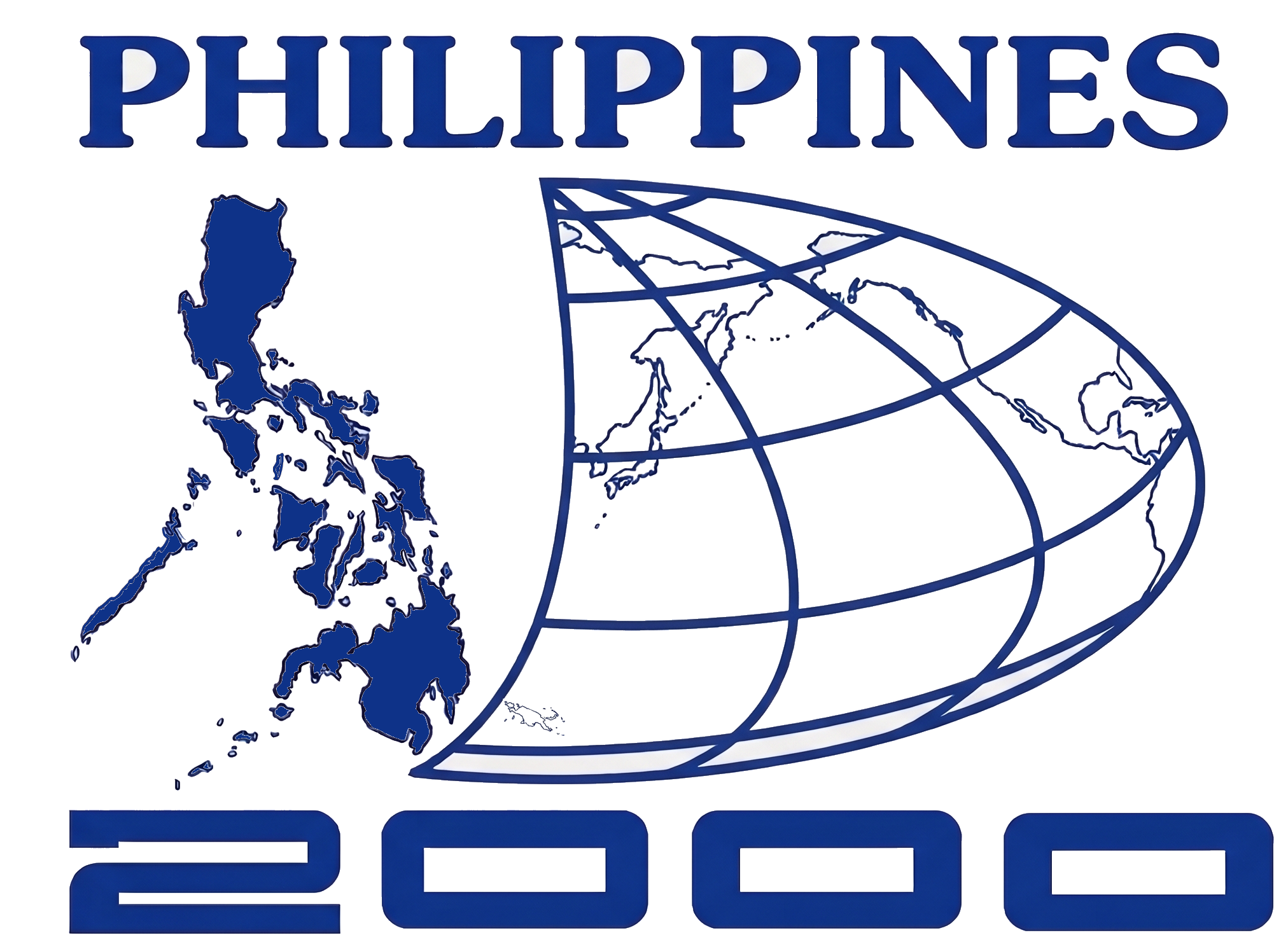
Logo used from 1993-1998

Philippines 2000 was the socio-economic program of former Philippine president Fidel V. Ramos. The plan envisioned the Philippines achieving a newly industrialized country status by the year 2000 and beyond.

== Effects and legacy ==
The Philippines 2000 platform was widely successful, making it one of the greatest legacies of the Ramos administration to the Philippines. Ramos was successfully able to open the then-closed Philippine economy and break Marcos-era formed monopolies, especially with regard to Philippine Airlines and the Philippine Long Distance Telephone Company, which were privatized and de-monopolized during his tenure. He was also able to resolve the power crisis in the Philippines through privatization of power plants and the construction of new ones. The reforms spurred additional investment into the Philippines.

Other economic reforms achieved during the Ramos administration was the re-adjustment of the value added tax from four percent to an International Monetary Fund and World Bank-mandated ten percent. The success of the reforms paved the way for the Philippines to be called "Asia's New Tiger".

Economic reforms instituted during the Ramos era enabled the Philippines to experience growth rates of up to nine percent annually, and enjoy annual budget surpluses well into his tenure. The economic reforms instituted in the Philippines 2000 platform would have an effect on how the Philippines would be affected in the 1997 East Asian financial crisis.

Perhaps one of the greatest legacies of Philippines 2000 regarding peace and stability was the 1996 peace treaty signed between the Philippine government and the Moro National Liberation Front, ending over thirty years of conflict on the island of Mindanao.

== Successors ==
The Philippines 2000 program would be succeeded by other socio-economic programs: Angat Pinoy 2004, instituted by Joseph Estrada, the ten-point Strong Republic agenda instituted by Gloria Macapagal Arroyo, Daang Matuwid agenda instituted by Benigno Aquino III, DuterteNomics agenda instituted by Rodrigo Duterte, and Bagong Pilipinas agenda instituted by Bongbong Marcos

== See also ==
- Economy of the Philippines
- Fidel V. Ramos
