= Development Academy of the Philippines =

Public graduate school and government think tank in the Philippines

- Akademya sa Pagpapaunlad ng Pilipinas

Agency overview
- Formed: June 23, 1973
- Headquarters: Pasig; 14.578578°N 121.057866°E
- Motto: Excellence, Integrity, Service
- Annual budget: Government funding
- Agency executive: Leocadio S. Sebastian, President
- Parent department: Department of Economy, Planning, and Development
- Website: www.dap.edu.ph
- Agency ID: DAP

The Development Academy of the Philippines (DAP; Filipino: Akademya sa Pagpapaunlad ng Pilipinas) is a government-owned and controlled corporation and graduate school attached to the Department of Economy, Planning, and Development (DEPDev). Established by Presidential Decree No. 205 on June 23, 1973, it provides graduate education, executive training, policy research, and consultancy services for the public sector and industry. The DAP's mandate is to support socio-economic development and governance initiatives in the Philippines.

== History ==
=== Establishment ===
DAP was founded under Presidential Decree No. 205, issued by President Ferdinand Marcos, to create a coordinated, ongoing program for capacity-building in the public and private sectors. It offers ongoing programs in human resource development, research, and institutional strengthening to support national development. Its mission addresses the human resource needs that are critical for economic and social development.

=== Recent developments ===
In October 2023, President Bongbong Marcos issued Executive Order No. 45, transferring DAP from the Office of the President to the National Economic and Development Authority (NEDA). This administrative shift aimed to improve the alignment and execution of economic and development policies.

On 8 February 2024, economist Majah-Leah V. Ravago was elected as DAP president by the Board of Trustees; her appointment was also noted by Ateneo de Manila University.

In 2024, DAP expanded its initiatives in capacity building and governance, including hosting the Government Quality Management Program (GQMP) Conference 2024, aiming to strengthen partnerships with the Asian Productivity Organization (APO), enhancing evaluation and monitoring practices for government agencies, and conducting international workshops on improving public sector service quality. These efforts underscore DAP's role in supporting national development and promoting excellence in public administration.

== Core functions ==
=== Education and training ===
- Graduate Programs in Public and Development Management
- Executive Education Programs
- Professional Development Courses
- Leadership Development Programs

=== Research and technical assistance ===
- Policy Research and Analysis
- Productivity and Quality Improvement
- Governance and Institutional Development
- Sustainable Development Studies

=== Consultancy services ===
- Strategic Planning and Management
- Organizational Development
- Process Improvement
- Quality Management Systems Implementation

== Organization ==
| | Board of Trustees | |
|---|---|---|
| Chairperson | Hon. Arsenio Balisacan | DEPDev Secretary |
| Co-chairperson | Hon. Marilyn Barua-Yap | CSC Chairperson |
| Member | Hon. Loren B. Legarda | Chairperson, Senate Higher, Technical and Vocational Education Committee |
| Member | Hon. Jude A. Acidre | Chairperson, House Committee on Higher and Technical Education |
| Member | Hon. Robert Lester F. Aranton | Alumni Regent & President, U.P. Alumni Association |
| Member | Hon. Early Sol A. Gadong | Faculty Regent |
| Member | Hon. Marie Theresa S. Alambra | Staff Regent |
| Member | Hon. Ron Dexter L. Clemente | Student Regent |
| Member | Hon. Alfredo E. Pascual | Appointed Regent by President Bongbong Marcos |
| Member | Hon. Gregorio B. Pastorfide | Appointed Regent by President Rodrigo Duterte |
| Member | Hon. Raul C. Pagdanganan | Appointed Regent by President Rodrigo Duterte |

== Facilities ==
=== DAP Building - Main Campus ===
Located along San Miguel Avenue, Ortigas Center, Pasig City, the main campus features:

- Administrative offices
- Training facilities
- Research centers
- Conference rooms

=== DAP Conference Center - Tagaytay ===
A facility in Tagaytay City offering:

- Conference halls
- Training rooms
- Accommodation facilities
- Recreational areas

== International partnerships ==
DAP maintains active partnerships with various international organizations:

- Asian Productivity Organization (APO)
- European Union (EU)
- Other ASEAN training institutions
