= Philippine Institute for Development Studies =

- Surian ng Pilipinas para sa Araling Pangkaunlaran

Agency overview
- Formed: September 26, 1977; 49 years ago
- Headquarters: Three Cyberpod Centris – North Tower, EDSA corner Quezon Avenue, Diliman, Quezon City; 14°38.5′N 121°2.4′E
- Agency executives: Arsenio Balisacan, Chairman (DEPDev Secretary); Aniceto C. Orbeta Jr., President
- Parent department: Department of Economy, Planning, and Development
- Website: www.pids.gov.ph
- Agency ID: PIDS

The Philippine Institute for Development Studies (PIDS; Filipino: Surian ng Pilipinas para sa Araling Pangkaunlaran) is a government-owned and controlled corporation of the Philippines. Established by Presidential Decree No. 1201 in September 1977, it conducts research to assist government planners. Its primary client is the Department of Economy, Planning, and Development (DEPDev).

== About the Institute ==
=== Roles and Goals ===
1. To develop and implement a comprehensive and integrated research program. The Institute will provide the research materials and studies required to formulate national development plans and policies;
2. To serve as a common link between the government and researching institutes;
3. To establish a repository for economic research information and other related activities.

=== Programs and Activities ===
==== To carry out its mandate, the Institute has maintained three basic programs, namely ====
1. Research Program
2. Outreach Program
3. Dissemination and Research Utilization Program.

==== The Policy Research Agenda for 2005-2009 include the following themes ====
1. Economic Policy Choices
2. Policies for Sustainable Human Development
3. Institutional Development and Good Governance

The Philippine Institute for Development Studies (PIDS) has developed various websites and online databases from socioeconomic indicators and agricultural statistics to economic-related bills.

=== Publications ===
- Policy Notes: observations/analyses written by PIDS researchers on policy issues.
- Development Research News: a bimonthly publication of the Institute which highlights findings and recommendations culled from PIDS-sponsored research and fora. This newsletter also includes articles on key national and current issues as well as news on PIDS activities participated in by the staff.
- Discussion Papers: preliminary, unedited and unreviewed papers circulated on a limited basis for the purpose of eliciting critical comments and suggestions for refinement of the studies. They may eventually graduate into any of the Institute's regular publication series.
- Economic Issue of the Day: a two-page publication which deals with concepts behind economic issues. Aims to define and explain in simple terms basic economic concepts as they relate to current and everyday economics-related matters.
- Philippine Journal of Development: (formerly Journal of Philippine Development) is a professional journal published twice a year which focuses on Philippine development. This is particularly on economy, business, public administration, foreign relations, sociology, political dynamics and other topics which have policy implications for Philippine concerns.
- Research Paper Series: a formal publication meant to promote research, stimulate discussion and encourage the use of study results.
