= Department of Economy, Planning, and Development =

Philippine government agency

Department of Economy, Planning and Development
- Kagawaran ng Ekonomiya, Pagpaplano, at Pagpapaunlad

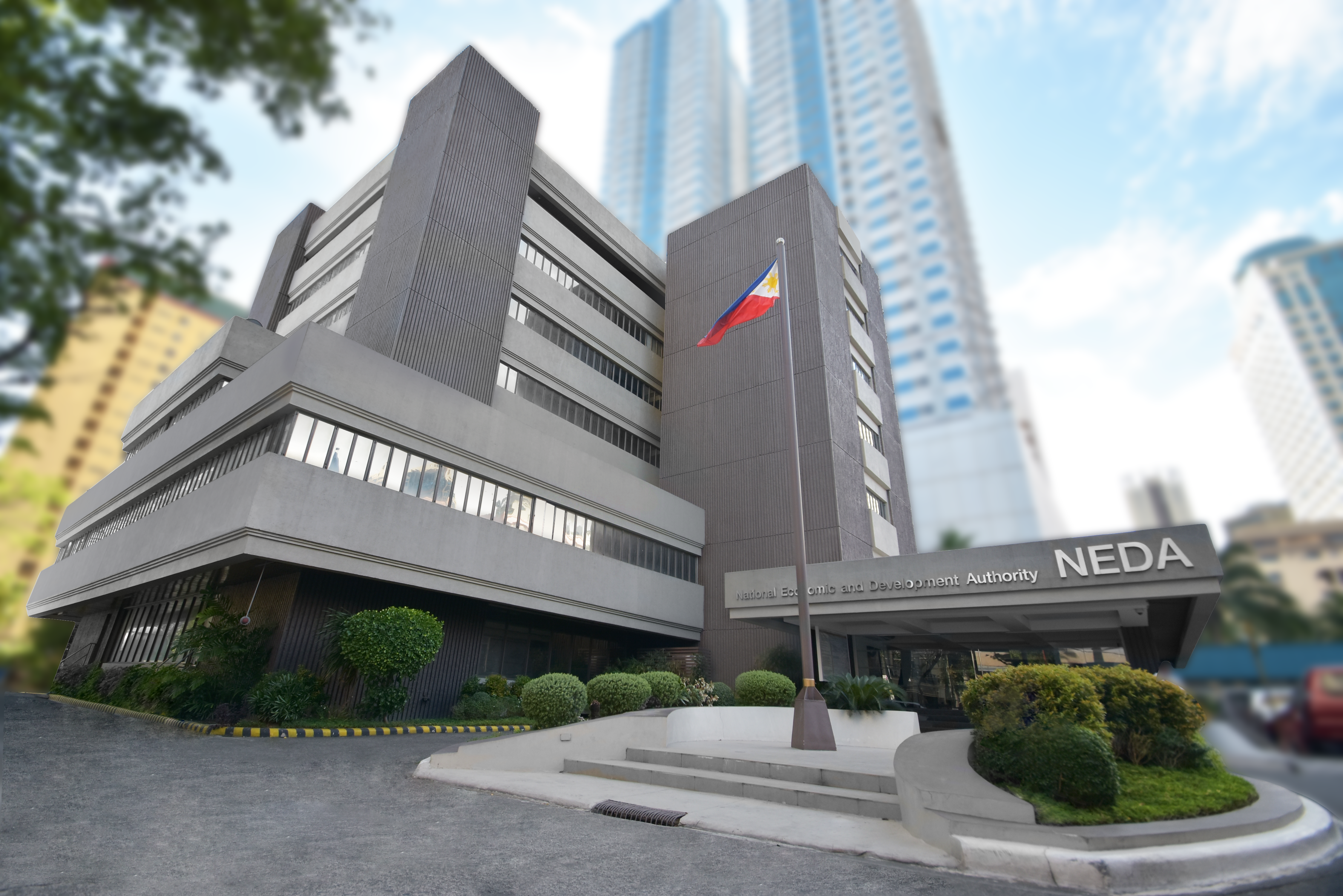
- The Central Office of DEPDev in Pasig when it was still known as NEDA

Agency overview
- Formed: December 23, 1935; 90 years ago
- Preceding agencies: National Economic Council (NEC); National Economic Development Authority; National Economic and Development Authority (NEDA)
- Headquarters: Floors 32–34, Mega Tower, EDSA corner Julia Vargas Avenue, Ortigas Center, Mandaluyong 12 St. Josemaria Escriva Drive, Ortigas Center, Pasig; 14°34.7′N 121°3.6′E
- Employees: 1,214 (2024)
- Annual budget: ₱1.720 billion (2022)
- Agency executive: Secretary Arsenio Balisacan
- Child agencies: Philippine Statistics Authority (PSA); Philippine Statistical Research and Training Institute (PSRTI); Philippine Institute for Development Studies (PIDS); Public–Private Partnership Center (PPPC); Tariff Commission; Philippine National Volunteer Service Coordinating Agency (PNVSCA); Commission on Population and Development (CPD)
- Website: depdev.gov.ph

The Department of Economy, Planning, and Development (DEPDev; Filipino: Kagawaran ng Ekonomiya, Pagpaplano, at Pagpapaunlad) is the executive department of the Philippine government responsible for national and regional economic policy, development, monitoring, and planning. DEPDev also oversees the planning and approval of large-scale government projects, assists the Department of Budget and Management in the crafting of the annual General Appropriations Act, oversees bilateral, regional, and multilateral trade policies and negotiations, and establishes frameworks on the use of land and natural resources in the country.

DEPDev was formed through the reorganization of the National Economic and Development Authority (NEDA) by Republic Act No. 12145, which transformed the independent agency into an executive department in the Cabinet.

The department is currently headed by Secretary Arsenio Balisacan, who formerly served as the director of the NEDA from June 30, 2022, until the creation of DEPDev.

== History and precursor agencies ==
=== National Economic Council ===
On November 15, 1935, the Commonwealth of the Philippines was inaugurated with Manuel L. Quezon as president, Sergio Osmeña as vice president, and a unicameral National Assembly as the Legislature. One of the first acts of Quezon administration was to call for a special session of Congress to enact certain laws needed by the government. Under Commonwealth Act No. 2, enacted on December 23, 1935, an advisory body for economic concerns of the Philippines called the National Economic Council was tasked with advising the government on economic and financial matters, and formulate an economic program based on national independence. The president was authorized to appoint its respective members with the consent of the Commission on Appointments of the National Assembly.

The year following its creation, the National Economic Council was organized on February 14, 1936, composed of its inaugural members – the secretary of finance (who served as chairperson), the secretary of agriculture and commerce, the chairperson of the board of directors of the Philippine National Bank, the president of the National Development Company, the president of the Manila Railroad Company, Mr. Joaquin M. Elizalde, Hon. R.J. Fernandez, Mr. Wenceslao Trinidad, Mr. Vicente Madrigal, Hon. Francisco Varona, Mr. Ramon Soriano, Hon. Vicente Singson Encarnacion, Hon. Rafael R. Alunan and Hon. Manuel Roxas.

The council was organized into eight committees: (1) Committee on agriculture and natural resources, (2) industry, (3) foreign trade and tariff, (4) domestic trade, (5) transportation and communication, (6) taxation, (7) labor and immigration, and (8) banking and finance. The first act of the council was to survey and adopt plans for an effective utilization and conservation of natural resources. The council also undertook a study, in cooperation with the National Development Company and Metropolitan Water District, on the potential of waterpower resources which eventually led to the enactment of Commonwealth Act No. 120, creating the National Power Corporation.

After World War II, the First Congress of the Philippines enacted Republic Act No. 51, which allowed the President of the Philippines to reorganize the Executive Branch of Government. In response, President Manuel Roxas amended the Administration Code of 1917 by issuing Executive Order No. 94, s. 1947. The Executive Order made the President of the Philippines the head of the National Economic Council.

During his administration, President Carlos P. Garcia saw the need to create a new office in charge of the supervision of government corporations, which he called the National Development Authority. President Garcia asked Congress to enact such a law during his 1958 State of the Nation Address. When Congress finally passed the law creating the National Development Authority, President Garcia disagreed with its limited powers, thus vetoing the bill sent to him as he mentioned in his 1959 State of the Nation Address

In 1960, Congress passed a law, which changed the composition of the National Economic Council through Republic Act No. 2699 enacted on June 18, 1960. The law increased the council's membership by including the Secretary of Commerce and Industry and granting the minority party representation in the membership of the National Economic Council. The council would continue to perform its functions throughout the Third Republic until the declaration of Martial Law on September 23, 1972.

=== National Economic Development Authority ===
The need for an office in charge of national development was revived during the administration of President Ferdinand Marcos. In his 1970 State of the Nation Address, Marcos said the administrative machinery of government must be restructured and revitalized to meet the challenge of change and development. Marcos, thereafter, crafted a government reorganization plan which included a National Economic Development Authority and submitted it to Congress for their approval.

In 1972, the National Economic Development Authority (without the conjunction "and") was created as the government's central planning body. The first major thrust of the government-wide reorganization effected through Presidential Decree (P.D.) No. 1 issued on September 24, 1972, otherwise known as the Integrated Reorganization Plan (IRP), was the provision for an integrated organizational complex for development planning and program implementation to correct the deficiencies of the system then existing. The IRP identified these deficiencies as: (1) the dispersal of planning functions among several economic planning bodies and ad hoc councils; (2) the lack of effective coordination among economic bodies; (3) the weak link between plan formulation and program execution; (4) the need to improve the capacity for sectoral and regional planning. The decree merged the National Economic Council and the Presidential Economic staff, created by Executive Order No. 8, s. 1966, and renamed it to the National Economic Development Authority. President Marcos subsequently issued Presidential Decree No. 1-A which delineated the composition of the National Economic Development Authority.

In 1973, the National Economic Development Authority was dissolved by virtue of Presidential Decree No. 107, s. 1973. The Presidential Decree created the National Economic and Development Authority (now, with the conjunction "and"), which absorbed the National Economic Development Authority as mandated in the 1973 Constitution.

On March 12, 1986, after the 1986 People Power revolution, Executive Order (EO) No. 5 was issued by President Corazon Aquino, directing a government-wide reorganization to promote economy, efficiency and effectiveness in the delivery of public services.

On July 22, 1987, EO 230 was issued reorganizing the NEDA. The implementation of this EO was completed on February 16, 1988, when NEDA commenced operations under its reorganized setup.

=== Department of Economy, Planning, and Development ===
Congressional efforts to reform and restructure the NEDA go back to 2009 prompted by the increasing scope of the responsibilities of the agency. As NEDA was a member of many inter-agency committees, oversaw both national and regional policies, and formulated operational standards, its transformation to a full-fledged executive department was seen as necessary.

On April 10, 2025, the Economy, Planning, and Development Act (Republic Act No. 12145) was signed by President Bongbong Marcos which formally created the Department of Economy, Planning, and Development as a successor to the NEDA. As the DEPDev was formed from the restructuring of NEDA, bodies such as the NEDA Board and its committees will remain in their current state until the NEDA can fully transition its operations according to the new DEPDev charter.

== List of secretaries of economy, planning, and development ==
=== Director-General of the National Economic Development Authority (1972–1973) ===
| Portrait | Name (Birth–Death) | Took office | Left office | President |
|---|---|---|---|---|
| | Gerardo Sicat (born 1935) | 1972 | 1973 | Ferdinand Marcos |

=== Director-General of the National Economic and Development Authority (1973–2025) ===
| Portrait | Name (Birth–Death) | Took office | Left office | President |
|---|---|---|---|---|
| | Gerardo Sicat (born 1935) | 1973 | 1981 | Ferdinand Marcos |
| | Placido Mapa Jr. (1932–2019) | 1981 | 1983 | Ferdinand Marcos |
| | Cesar Virata (1930–2026) | 1983 | 1984 | Ferdinand Marcos |
| | Vicente Valdepeñas Jr. | 1984 | 1986 | Ferdinand Marcos |
| | Winnie Monsod (born 1940) | March 7, 1986 | June 28, 1989 | Corazon Aquino |
| | Filologo Pante Jr. Acting | June 28, 1989 | August 9, 1989 | Corazon Aquino |
| | Jesus Estanislao | August 9, 1989 | January 1, 1990 | Corazon Aquino |
| | Cayetano Paderanga Jr. (1948–2016) | January 1, 1990 | June 30, 1992 | Corazon Aquino |
| | Cielito Habito (born 1953) | June 30, 1992 | June 30, 1998 | Fidel V. Ramos |
| | Felipe Medalla | June 30, 1998 | January 20, 2001 | Joseph Estrada |
| | Dante Canlas | January 20, 2001 | December 13, 2002 | Gloria Macapagal Arroyo |
| | Romulo Neri (born 1950) | December 13, 2002 | July 14, 2005 | Gloria Macapagal Arroyo |
| | 'Augusto Santos'; Acting | July 14, 2005 | February 16, 2006 | Gloria Macapagal Arroyo |
| | Romulo Neri (born 1950) | February 16, 2006 | August 16, 2007 | Gloria Macapagal Arroyo |
| | 'Augusto Santos'; Acting | August 16, 2007 | July 23, 2008 | Gloria Macapagal Arroyo |
| | Ralph Recto (born 1964) | July 23, 2008 | August 16, 2009 | Gloria Macapagal Arroyo |
| | 'Augusto Santos'; Acting | August 19, 2009 | June 30, 2010 | Gloria Macapagal Arroyo |
| | Cayetano Paderanga Jr. (1948–2016) | June 30, 2010 | May 10, 2012 | Benigno S. Aquino III |
| | Arsenio Balisacan (born 1957) | May 10, 2012 | January 31, 2016 | Benigno S. Aquino III |
| | Emmanuel Esguerra; Acting | February 1, 2016 | June 30, 2016 | Benigno S. Aquino III |
| | Ernesto Pernia (born 1943) | June 30, 2016 | April 16, 2020 | Rodrigo Roa Duterte |
| | Karl Kendrick Chua (Note: Karl Kendrick Chua served in an acting capacity from April 17, 2020 until June 2, 2021.) (born 1978) | April 17, 2020 | June 2, 2021 | Rodrigo Roa Duterte |
| | Karl Kendrick Chua (born 1978) | June 2, 2021 | June 30, 2022 | Rodrigo Roa Duterte |
| | Arsenio Balisacan (born 1957) | June 30, 2022 | April 10, 2025 | Ferdinand R. Marcos Jr. |

=== Secretary of Economy, Planning, and Development (2025–present) ===
| Portrait | Name (Birth–Death) | Took office | Left office | President |
|---|---|---|---|---|
| | Arsenio Balisacan (born 1957) | April 10, 2025 | Incumbent | Ferdinand R. Marcos Jr. |

== Governing law ==
Republic Act No. 12145, signed by President Bongbong Marcos on April 10, 2025, reorganized the NEDA into the Department of Economy, Planning, and Development. The Director-General of NEDA was converted into the Secretary of Economy, Planning, and Development and the NEDA Board that served as the agency's topmost organ was reconstituted as the Economy and Development Council. Its transformation into an executive department was seen as a necessary evolution given the agency's expansion into interagency cooperation, regional development, and oversight of other agencies such as the PSA or LEDAC since the signing of Executive Order 230 that reorganized the NEDA.

== Economy and Development Council ==
The department is headed by the Economy and Development Council (ED Council) that oversees national and regional policy direction on economic matters and the implementation of policies for economic growth and development. It also approves programs and projects that promote economic development, government expenditures, etc.

It is established as the successor to the NEDA Board which will remain as the primary steering committee of the DEPDev until the formal organization of the ED Council. On August 13, the composition of the ED Council was modified to include the Special Assistant to the President for Investment and Economic Affairs and expand certain committees. Outlined below are the officials who compose the ED Council:

Composition of the Economy and Development Council
| Board Position | Incumbent | Office |
|---|---|---|
| Chairperson: | His Excellency Ferdinand R. Marcos Jr. | President of the Philippines |
| Vice-chairperson: | Secretary Arsenio M. Balisacan | Department of Economy, Planning, and Development |
| Members: | Executive Secretary Ralph G. Recto | Office of the President |
| Members: | Secretary Francisco Tiu Laurel Jr. | Department of Agriculture |
| Members: | Secretary Kim Robert C. de Leon | Department of Budget and Management |
| Members: | Secretary Juan Edgardo M. Angara | Department of Education |
| Members: | Secretary Sharon Garin | Department of Energy |
| Members: | Secretary Frederick D. Go | Department of Finance |
| Members: | Secretary Edwin M. Mercado | Department of Health |
| Members: | Secretary Jose Ramon P. Aliling | Department of Human Settlements and Urban Development |
| Members: | Secretary Juanito Victor C. Remulla | Department of Interior and Local Government |
| Members: | Secretary Francis N. Tolentino | Department of Labor and Employment |
| Members: | Secretary Vivencio B. Dizon | Department of Transportation |
| Members: | Secretary Maria Christina Aldeguer-Roque | Department of Trade and Industry |
| Members: | Secretary Giovanni Z. Lopez | Department of Public Works and Highways |
| Members: | Secretary Antonio Ernesto F. Lagdameo | Office of the Special Assistant to the President |
| Members: | Secretary Lino Edgardo S. Cayetano | Presidential Communications Office |
| Members: | Secretary Anna Liza G. Logan | Chief Presidential Legal Counsel |
| Members: | Chairperson Leo Tereso A. Magno | Mindanao Development Authority |

In addition to the regular members of the council, the Chief Minister of the Bangsamoro Autonomous Region in Muslim Mindanao serves as an ex officio member of the council for matters concerning the BARMM. The Governor of the Bangko Sentral ng Pilipinas may also serve as a resource person during meetings of the council.

=== Committees of the Economy and Development Council ===
The council is assisted by seven advisory committees for policy coordination:

1. Development Budget Coordination Committee (DBCC)
2. Economic Development Committee (EDCom)
3. Investment Coordination Committee (ICC)
4. Social Development Committee (SDC)
5. Infrastructure Committee (InfraCom)
6. Tariff and Related Matters Committee (TRMC)
7. National Land Use Committee (NLUC)
8. Regional Development Committee (RDCom)

The DEPDev serves as the secretariat for all committees of the council.

==== Development Budget Coordination Committee (DBCC) ====
The DBCC oversees the formation of the annual budget, government spending programs, capital outlays for government programs, cost-sharing initiatives between the national government and local government units, foreign and domestic borrowing, and formation of multi-year fiscal programs. The DBCC then recommends these policies to the President for final approval.

The DBCC also reviews fiscal and macroeconomic targets as well as the revenues and expenditures of the national government.

Composition of the Development Budget Coordination Committee
| Board Position | Incumbent | Office |
|---|---|---|
| Chairperson: | Acting Secretary Rolando U. Toledo | Department of Budget and Management |
| Co-chairperson: | Secretary Frederick Go | Department of Finance |
| Vice-chairperson: | Secretary Arsenio M. Balisacan | Department of Economy, Planning, and Development |
| Member: | | Special Assistant to the President for Investment and Economic Affairs |

==== Economic Development Committee (EDCom) ====
The EDCom is tasked with harmonizing and coordinating policies across agencies that are part of the economic and development agenda. The focuses on the competitiveness of local business, support for farming and rural enterprises, efforts to mitigate inflation, research on national productivity, and the equitable distribution of economic opportunities.

The EDCom also consists of the Sub-Committee on Inflation Monitoring and Market Outlook that advises the EDCom on the maintenance of inflation within the government's targets.

Composition of the Economic Development Committee
| Board Position | Incumbent | Office |
|---|---|---|
| Chairperson: | Secretary Frederick D. Go | Special Assistant to the President for Investment and Economic Affairs |
| Vice-chairpersons: | Secretary Arsenio M. Balisacan | Secretary of the DEPDev |
| Vice-chairpersons: | Secretary Ralph Recto | Department of Finance |
| Members: | Secretary Francisco Tiu Laurel Jr. | Department of Agriculture |
| Members: | Secretary Amenah F. Pangandaman | Department of Budget and Management |
| Members: | Secretary Henry Aguda | Department of Information and Communications Technology |
| Members: | Secretary Jonvic Remulla | Department of Interior and Local Government |
| Members: | Secretary Sharon Garin | Department of Energy |
| Members: | Secretary Ralph Recto | Department of Finance |
| Members: | Secretary Bienvenido Laguesma | Department of Labor and Employment |
| Members: | Secretary Renato Solidum Jr. | Department of Science and Technology |
| Members: | Secretary Christina Frasco | Department of Tourism |
| Members: | Secretary Vince Dizon | Department of Transportation |
| Members: | Secretary Manuel M. Bonoan | Department of Public Works and Highways |
| Members: | Secretary Christina Aldeguer-Roque | Department of Trade and Industry |

==== Infrastructure Development Committee (InfraCom) ====
The InfraCom advises the President on policies and programs related to infrastructure development and endorses infrastructural master plans and projects to the ED Council. The InfraCom also coordinates the activities of government agencies and government-owned and -controlled corporations (GOCCs) involved in infrastructure development.

Composition of the Infrastructure Development Committee
| Board Position | Incumbent | Office |
|---|---|---|
| Co-chairpersons: | Secretary Manuel M. Bonoan | Department of Public Works and Highways |
| Co-chairpersons: | Secretary Arsenio M. Balisacan | Secretary of the DEPDev |
| Members: | Secretary Frederick D. Go | Special Assistant to the President for Investment and Economic Affairs |
| Members: | Secretary Francisco Tiu Laurel Jr. | Department of Agriculture |
| Members: | Secretary Amenah F. Pangandaman | Department of Budget and Management |
| Members: | Secretary Raphael Lotilla | Department of Environment and Natural Resources |
| Members: | Secretary Jose Ramon Aliling | Department of Human Settlements and Urban Development |
| Members: | Secretary Henry Aguda | Department of Information and Communications Technology |
| Members: | Secretary Jonvic Remulla | Department of Interior and Local Government |
| Members: | Secretary Sharon Garin | Department of Energy |
| Members: | Secretary Ralph Recto | Department of Finance |
| Members: | Secretary Christina Frasco | Department of Tourism |
| Members: | Secretary Vince Dizon | Department of Transportation |
| Members: | Secretary Christina Aldeguer-Roque | Department of Trade and Industry |

==== Investment Coordination Committee (ICC) ====
The ICC assesses and evaluates the viability of major capital projects, outlines their implementation, oversees public-private partnerships and reports on the fiscal implications of investment and foreign borrowing programs.

Composition of the Investment Coordination Committee
| Board Position | Incumbent | Office |
|---|---|---|
| Co-chairpersons: | Secretary Ralph Recto | Department of Finance |
| Co-chairpersons: | Secretary Arsenio M. Balisacan | Secretary of the DEPDev |
| Members: | Secretary Frederick D. Go | Special Assistant to the President for Investment and Economic Affairs |
| Members: | Secretary Amenah F. Pangandaman | Department of Budget and Management |
| Members: | Secretary Sharon Garin | Department of Energy |
| Members: | Secretary Christina Aldeguer-Roque | Department of Trade and Industry |

==== Social Development Committee (SDC) ====
The SDC proposes policies and programs relating to social development, education, human resources, health and nutrition, family planning, social protections, human settlements, and Overseas Filipino Workers to the ED Council and coordinates their implementation.

Composition of the Social Development Committee
| Board Position | Incumbent | Office |
|---|---|---|
| Co-chairpersons: | Secretary Bienvenido Laguesma | Department of Labor and Employment |
| Co-chairpersons: | Secretary Arsenio M. Balisacan | Secretary of the DEPDev |
| Members: | Secretary Frederick D. Go | Special Assistant to the President for Investment and Economic Affairs |
| Members: | Secretary Francisco Tiu Laurel Jr. | Department of Agriculture |
| Members: | Secretary Conrado Estrella III | Department of Agrarian Reform |
| Members: | Secretary Amenah F. Pangandaman | Department of Budget and Management |
| Members: | Secretary Juan Edgardo M. Angara | Department of Education |
| Members: | Secretary Henry Aguda | Department of Information and Communications Technology |
| Members: | Secretary Jose Ramon Aliling | Department of Human Settlements and Urban Development |
| Members: | Secretary Jonvic Remulla | Department of Interior and Local Government |
| Members: | Secretary Rex Gatchalian | Department of Social Welfare and Development |
| Members: | Secretary Ted Herbosa | Department of Health |
| Members: | Secretary Hans Cacdac | Department of Migrant Workers |
| Members: | Chairperson Shirley Agrupis | Commission on Higher Education |
| Members: | Director-General Jose Francisco Benitez | Technical Education and Skills Development Authority |
| Members: | Lead Convenor Lope B. Santos III | National Anti-Poverty Commission |

==== Tariff and Related Matters Committee (TRMC) ====
The TRMC recommends tariff rationalization and trade policies to the President and advises the ED Council on developments in trade policies. The TRMC also oversees the implementation of bilateral, regional, and multilateral economic negotiations on the trade of goods and services.

Composition of the Tariff and Related Matters Committee
| Board Position | Incumbent | Office |
|---|---|---|
| Co-chairpersons: | Secretary Christina Aldeguer-Roque | Department of Trade and Industry |
| Co-chairpersons: | Secretary Arsenio M. Balisacan | Department of Economy, Planning, and Development |
| Members: | Executive Secretary Ralph G. Recto | Office of the President |
| Members: | Secretary Francisco Tiu Laurel Jr. | Department of Agriculture |
| Members: | Secretary Conrado Estrella III | Department of Agrarian Reform |
| Members: | Acting Secretary Rolando U. Toledo | Department of Budget and Management |
| Members: | Secretary Raphael Lotilla | Department of Environment and Natural Resources |
| Members: | Secretary Tess Lazaro | Department of Foreign Affairs |
| Members: | Secretary Henry Aguda | Department of Information and Communications Technology |
| Members: | Secretary Ralph Recto | Department of Finance |
| Members: | Secretary Bienvenido Laguesma | Department of Labor and Employment |
| Members: | Chairperson Marilou P. Mendoza | Tariff Commission |
| Members: | Chairperson Michael G. Aguinaldo | Philippine Competition Commission |
| Members: | Governor Eli M. Remolona Jr. | Bangko Sentral ng Pilipinas |

==== National Land Use Committee (NLUC) ====
The NLUC advises the President and the ED Council on land use and physical planning, identifies present land resources, harmonizes guidelines and frameworks on the use of land and space, provides technical support to the Department of Justice on the resolution of land disputes, and proposes the National Framework for Physical Planning.

The NLUC is also tasked with integrating disaster risk management and climate change adaptation policies into socio-economic plans and projects.

Composition of the National Land Use Committee
| Board Position | Incumbent | Office |
|---|---|---|
| Chairperson: | Secretary Arsenio M. Balisacan | Secretary of the DEPDev |
| Members: | Executive Secretary Lucas P. Bersamin | Office of the President |
| Members: | Secretary Francisco Tiu Laurel Jr. | Department of Agriculture |
| Members: | Secretary Conrado Estrella III | Department of Agrarian Reform |
| Members: | Secretary Raphael Lotilla | Department of Environment and Natural Resources |
| Members: | Secretary Jose Ramon Aliling | Department of Human Settlements and Urban Development |
| Members: | Secretary Jonvic Remulla | Department of Interior and Local Government |
| Members: | Secretary Manuel M. Bonoan | Department of Public Works and Highways |
| Members: | | Union of Local Authorities of the Philippines |

==== Regional Development Committee (RDCom) ====
The RDCom formulates and monitors regional development, coordinates inter-regional development policies and programs, formulates and monitors the implementation of regional programs under the Philippine Development Plan, and promotes the equitable allocation of fiscal resources.

Composition of the Regional Development Committee
| Board Position | Incumbent | Office |
|---|---|---|
| Chairperson: | Secretary Arsenio M. Balisacan | Secretary of the DEPDev |
| Members: | Executive Secretary Lucas P. Bersamin | Office of the President |
| Members: | Secretary Amenah F. Pangandaman | Department of Budget and Management |
| Members: | Secretary Jonvic Remulla | Department of Interior and Local Government |
| Members: | Vacant | RDC Luzon Area Committee Chairperson |
| Members: | Vacant | RDC Visayas Area Committee Chairperson |
| Members: | Vacant | RDC Mindanao Area Committee Chairperson |

== National Innovation Council ==
The National Innovation Council (NIC; Filipino: Pambansang Konseho sa Inobasyon) is the Philippine government's highest policy-making body for national innovation development. It was established to develop the country's innovation goals, priorities, and long-term national strategy established by virtue of Republic Act No. 11293 or the Philippine Innovation Act of 2018. It is headed by the president of the Philippines as chairman of the NIC, with the Secretary of Socioeconomic Planning as vice-chairman.

The NIC is operationalized by an Executive Director who also leads the National Innovation Council Secretariat which is housed under the Department of Economy, Planning, and Development. It provides strategic foresight, funding, capacity building, and policy coordination initiatives for a smarter and more innovative Philippines.

The primary functions of the NIC are in the formulation and development of the National Innovation Agenda and Strategy Document (NIASD), the management of the Innovation Fund, the oversight over Innovation Credit and Financing programs through the Bangko Sentral ng Pilipinas, and in monitoring the Global Innovation Index (GII) ranking of the country.

As defined by the law, "innovation" refers to the creation of new ideas that results in the development of new or improved policies, products, processes, or services which are then spread or transferred across the market.

== Other offices ==
1. The Legislative-Executive Development Advisory Council (LEDAC) Secretariat.
2. The Legislative Liaison Office (LLO)

== Attached agencies ==
Following its reorganization by Republic Act No. 12145, the attached agencies of the DEPDev are classified into 3 groups:

Agencies attached for administrative supervision:

1. Philippine National Volunteer Service Coordinating Agency (PNVSCA)
2. Tariff Commission (TC)

Agencies attached for policy coordination:

1. Philippine Statistics Authority
2. Philippine Statistical Research and Training Institute (PSRTI)

Agencies attached for policy and program coordination:

1. Philippine Institute for Development Studies (PIDS)
2. Commission on Population and Development (CPD)
3. Development Academy of the Philippines (DAP)
4. Public-Private Partnership Center of the Philippines (PPPC)

== See also ==
- Economy of the Philippines
- Philippines–Australia Community Assistance Program
