= Moctar =

Moctar is a surname and a given name. Notable people with the name include:

Surname:

- Jidou El Moctar (born 1985), Mauritanian Olympic runner
- Mdou Moctar (born 1984), Nigerien guitarist, singer and songwriter
- Mohamed El Moctar, Malian politician
- Omara Moctar (born 1980), a.k.a. Bombino, Tuareg singer-songwriter and guitarist from Niger
- Souleyman Chebal Moctar (born 1986), track athlete from Mauritania

Given name:

- Moctar Musah Bambah, Ghanaian politician and MP
- Moustapha Moctar Belbi (born 1986), Cameroon footballer
- Moctar Cissé (born 1993), Mali international footballer
- Moctar Ould Diay (born 1973), Prime Minister of Mauritania since 2024
- Aminetou Mint El-Moctar (born 1956), Mauritanian politician, women's rights activist
- Mohamed El-Moctar El-Shinqiti (born 1966), Mauritanian political activist, author, academic
- Moctar Sidi El Hacen (born 1997), a.k.a. Hacen, Mauritanian professional footballer
- Moctar Ouane (born 1955), Malian diplomat, acting Prime Minister of Mali
- Ibrahima Moctar Sarr (born 1949), Mauritanian journalist and politician
- Moctar Touré, Senegalese professor of Agricultural & Nutritional Sciences
