= List of ambassadors to the Philippines =

The following is a list of ambassadors to the Republic of the Philippines, both resident and non-resident.

== Resident Ambassadors ==
Sending country	Ambassador/Head of Mission	Date of accreditation	Ref.
Angola	Daniel António Rosa	17 January 2022	
Argentina	Ricardo Luis Bocalandro	05 May 2022	
Australia	Marc Innes-Brown	19 August 2025	
Austria	Johann Brieger	11 October 2022	
Bahrain	Abdulla Mohamed H. Alkarbabadi; Chargé d'affaires, a.i.		
Bangladesh	Mohammad Sarwar Mahmood	15 May 2025	
Belgium	Vladislava Iordanova	02 October 2025	
Brazil	Gilberto Fonseca Guimarães de Moura	16 January 2024	
Brunei	Megawati Manan	23 March 2023	
Cambodia	Sin Saream	25 March 2025	
Canada	David Bruce Hartman	31 January 2023	
Chile	Felipe Alejandro Díaz Ibáñez	11 December 2025	
China	Jing Quan	11 December 2025	
Colombia	Edgar Rodrigo Rojas Garavito	25 March 2025	
Czechia	Karel Hejč	24 October 2023	
Denmark	Franz-Michael Skjold Mellbin	13 October 2022	
Egypt	Ihab Ahmed Aboserie Ahmed	19 October 2026	
European Union	Mario Màssimo Santoro	25 September 2024	
Finland	Saija Sinikka Nurminen	25 September 2024	
France	Donatienne Hissard ép Maillard	01 October 2026	
Germany	Andreas Michael Pfaffernoschke	17 August 2023	
Greece	Ioannis Pediotis	25 May 2022	
Holy See	Charles John Brown	14 December 2020	
Hungary	Mike Gyula; Chargé d'affaires, a.i.		
India	Harsh Kumar Jain	23 September 2024	
Indonesia	Victorina Hesti Dewayani; Chargé d'Affaires, a.i.		
Iran	Yousef Esmaeil Zadeh	17 August 2023	
Iraq	Ahmed Yaseen Issa Al-Juboori; Chargé d'Affaires, a.i.		
Ireland	Emma Hickey	25 September 2024	
Israel	Dana Kursh	19 August 2025	
Italy	Davide Giglio	23 September 2024	
Japan	Katsuro Kitagawa	02 October 2026	
Kuwait	Meshari Yousef Muhammad Al-Nibari	10 June 2025	
Laos	Thiphasone Sengsourinha	27 February 2026	
Libya	Mohamed K A Issa; Chargé d'Affaires, a.i.		
Malaysia	Abdul Malik Melvin Castelino	23 March 2023	
Mexico	Daniel Hernández Joseph	10 July 2023	
Morocco	Mohammed Rida El Fassi	10 January 2017	
Myanmar	Ei Ei Tin; Chargé d'Affaires, a.i.		
Netherlands	Roderick Franciscus Nicolaas Willibrodus Wols	24 September 2026	
New Zealand	Catherine Rosemary McIntosh	07 May 2024	
Nigeria	Ibok-Ete Ekwe Ibas	01 September 2026	
Norway	Kristian Netland	08 September 2026	
Oman	Nasser Said Abdullah Al-Manwari	31 January 2023	
Pakistan	Asima Rabbani	10 June 2025	
Palau (Note: The Palauan embassy is led by a chargé d'affaires, as the ambassador accredited to the Philippines is resident in Tokyo, Japan.)	Keith Richard Sugiyama; Chargé d'affaires, a.i.		
Palestine	Mounir Y.K. Anastas	26 February 2025	
Panama	Eduardo Antonio Young Virzi	12 March 2025	
Papua New Guinea	Stephen Pokanis	27 February 2026	
Peru	Carmen del Rocío Azurín Araujo	03 June 2026	
Poland	Katarzyna Dorota Wilkowiecka; Chargé d'affaires, a.i.		
Qatar	Ahmed Saad N. A. Al-Homidi	23 March 2023	
Romania	Gheorghe Anghel; Chargé d'affaires, a.i.		
Russia	Marat Ignatyevich Pavlov	02 December 2020	
Saudi Arabia	Faisal Ebraheem M. Al-Ajrafi Al-Ghamdi	10 June 2025	
Singapore	See Sin Yuan Angelita Constance	08 June 2023	
Slovakia	Miloš Koterec	27 February 2026	
Slovenia	Smiljana Knez	26 February 2025	
South Africa	Bartinah Ntombizodwa Radebe-Netshitenzhe	04 December 2019	
South Korea	Lee Dong-gy		
Spain	Xavier Martí Martí	04 November 2026	
Sovereign Military Order of Malta	Maria Lourdes Bernadette Zaragoza Banson	03 June 2026	
Sri Lanka	Chanaka Harsha Talpahewa	10 October 2023	
Sweden	Anny Pernilla Ferry	27 February 2025	
Switzerland	Edgard Cristoph Dörig	24 September 2026	
Thailand	Makawadee Sumitmor	10 June 2025	
Timor-Leste	Marciano Octavio Garcia da Silva	02 January 2024	
Turkey	Kaan Esener	19 October 2026	
Ukraine	Yuliia Fediv	25 March 2025	
United Arab Emirates	Mohamed Obaid Salem Al-Qataam Al-Zaabi	20 October 2021	
United Kingdom	Sarah Anne Pascale Hulton	02 October 2025	
United States	Lee Marc Lipton	30 June 2026	
Venezuela	Richard Gregorio Espinoza Lobo; Chargé d'Affaires a.i.		
Vietnam	Lại Thái Bình	02 January 2024	

== Non-Resident Ambassadors ==
Sending country	Ambassador/Head of Mission	Date of accreditation	Country of residence	Ref.
Afghanistan	Bashir Mohabbat; Ambassador-designate		Japan	
Albania	Ermal Muça	14 April 2026	Japan	
Algeria	Abdelhafid Bounour	22 May 2024	Malaysia	
Armenia	Suren Baghdasaryan	15 May 2025	Vietnam	
Azerbaijan	Ramil Abil oğlu Rzayev	14 April 2026	Indonesia	
Bahamas	Paulette Bethel		China	
Barbados	Hallam Henry		China	
Belarus	Raman Ramanouski	14 May 2024	Indonesia	
Benin	Fadilou Moutairou; Chargé d'Affaires a.i.		Japan	
Bolivia	Angela Karin Ayllon Quisbert; Chargé d'Affaires a.i.		Japan	
Botswana	Gotsileene Morake	22 May 2024	Japan	
Bulgaria	Pavlin Todorov	19 March 2025	Vietnam	
Burkina Faso	Bibata Nébié-Ouédraogo	25 November 2025	Japan	
Burundi	Télésphore Irambona	27 October 2026	China	
Cameroon	Eleih-Elle Etian		China	
Cape Verde	Tania Serafim Yvonne Romualdo		China	
Chad	Abakar Saleh Chahaimi	27 October 2026	China	
Comoros	Maoulana Charif		China	
Congo-Brazzaville	Daniel Owassa	January 8, 2015	China	
Congo-Kinshasa	François Balamuene Nkuna	19 March 2025	China	
Costa Rica	Victor Hugo Rojas González	19 March 2025	Singapore	
Croatia	Nebojša Koharović	20 May 20 2021	Indonesia	
Cuba	Yadira Ledesma Hernández	15 May 2025	Malaysia	
Cyprus	Nicholas Panayiotou	07 November 2024	Indonesia	
Djibouti	Ibrahim Bileh Doualeh	22 May 2024	Japan	
Dominican Republic	Reinaldo Rafael Espinal	04 August 2026	Vietnam	
Ecuador	Santiago Javier Chávez Pareja	25 April 2023	Indonesia	
El Salvador	Martha Lidia Zelayandia Cisneros	January 10, 2013	Japan	
Equatorial Guinea	Mauricio Mauro Epkua Obama Bindang	07 November 2024	China	
Eritrea	Tseggai Tesfazion	18 March 2004	China	
Estonia	Mait Martinson	22 May 2024	Japan	
Ethiopia	Dessie Dalki Dukamo	15 August 2023	South Korea	
Fiji	Isoa Delamisi Tikoca	27 October 2026	Indonesia	
Gabon	Landry Mboumba	04 August 2026	South Korea	
Gambia	Massaneh Nyuku Kinteh	04 August 2026	China	
Georgia	Tornike Nozadze	14 April 2026	Indonesia	
Ghana	Florence Buerki Akonor	14 May 2024	Malaysia	
Guatemala	Manuel Estuardo Roldán Barillas	03 October 2023	Japan	
Guinea	Moussa Fanta Camara	07 November 2024	Japan	
Guinea-Bissau	António Serifo Embaló	08 August 2023	China	
Guyana	Bayney Karran; Ambassador-designate		China	
Haiti	Darlier Dorval; Chargé d'Affaires a.i.		Vietnam	
Honduras	Harold Burgos	19 March 2025	Japan	
Iceland	Hreinn Pálsson	14 April 2026	Japan	
Ivory Coast	Gbolié Désiré Wulfran Ipo	14 April 2026	Japan	
Jamaica	Shorna-Kay Marie Richards	18 January 2022	Japan	
Jordan	Nasser Shraideh	27 October 2026	Japan	
Kazakhstan	Serzhan Abdykarimov; Ambassador-designate		Indonesia	
Kenya	Abdirashid Salat Abdille; Ambassador-designate		Indonesia	>
Kyrgyzstan	Mirlan Arstanbaev	14 December 2021	Japan	
Lebanon	Nidal Yehya	02 August 2021	Japan	
Lesotho	Retšelisitsoe Theko	04 August 2026	Japan	
Liberia	Francis N. Muhoro; Ambassador-designate		Japan	
Lithuania	Ričardas Šlepavičius	03 October 2023	South Korea	
Luxembourg	Michel Leesch	19 March 2025	Japan	
Madagascar	Randrianjafy Maherizo Tsilavo; Charge d'Affaires a.i.		Japan	
Malawi	Kwacha Chisiza	05 October 2023	Japan	
Maldives	Mariyam Shabeena Ahmed	19 August 2025	Malaysia	
Mali	Mohamed El Moctar; Ambassador-designate		Japan	
Malta	John Busuttil	14 May 2024	China	
Marshall Islands	Anjanette Kattil	25 November 2025	Taiwan	
Mauritania	B.A. Samba Mamadou	05 December 2022	Japan	
Mauritius	Jagdishwar Goburdun	22 May 2024	Malaysia	
Micronesia	John S. Fritz	07 November 2024	Japan	
Mongolia	Enkhtaivan Dashnyam	15 May 2025	Indonesia	
Namibia	Herman Pule Diamonds	05 October 2023	Malaysia	
Nepal	Netra Prasad Timsina	19 August 2025	Malaysia	
Nicaragua	Mario Armengol Campos	07 November 2024	Vietnam	
Niger	Dambina Bawa		China	
North Korea	Kim Je Bong	01 June 2021	Thailand	
Palau	Peter Adelbai	15 May 2025	Tokyo	
Paraguay	Miguel Ángel Ubaldino Romero Álvarez	25 November 2025	South Korea	
Portugal	Miguel de Mascarenhas de Calheiros Velozo	19 March 2025	Indonesia	
Rwanda	Mukasine Marie Claire	19 March 2025	Japan	
Samoa	Faalavaau Perina J. Sila-Tualaulelei	09 June 2016	Japan	
San Marino	Massimo Ferdinandi		Indonesia	
Senegal	Abdoulaye Barro; Ambassador-designate		Malaysia	
Serbia	Ivana Golubović-Duboka	25 November 2025	Indonesia	
Seychelles	Lalatiana Accouche; Ambassador-designate		India	
Sierra Leone	Kathos Jibao Mattai	20 May 2021	South Korea	
Somalia	Ali Mohamed Abukar	14 April 2026	Malaysia	
South Sudan	Michael Milli Husein	January 22, 2015	China	
Sudan	Hassan Abdelsalam Omer	22 May 2024	Malaysia	
Suriname	Erick Rahmat Moertabat; Ambassador-designate		Indonesia	
Tanzania	Ramadhani Kitwana-Dau	17 January 2018	Malaysia	
Togo	Bodjona Alewabia Delali Aklesso		Japan	
Tonga	Angelika Latufuipeka Tuku’aho	24 July 2019	Australia	
Trinidad and Tobago	Dwayne Thompson; Chargé d’ Affaires a.i.		China	
Tunisia	Mohamed Trabelsi	25 November 2025	Indonesia	
Turkmenistan	Atadurdy Bayramov	14 May 2024	Japan	
Uganda	Betty Oyella Bigombe	10 October 2023	Malaysia	
Uruguay	Cristina González	07 November 2024	Indonesia	
Uzbekistan	Farhod Arziev	22 May 2024	China	
Yemen	Adel Mohamed Ali Ba Hamid	23 January 2018	Malaysia	
Zambia	Morecome Mumba	22 May 2024	Malaysia	
Zimbabwe	Constance Chemwayi	08 August 2023	Malaysia	

== See also ==
- Foreign relations of the Philippines
- List of diplomatic missions in the Philippines
