= List of ambassadors of South Sudan to China =

Coordinates: 39.936722°N 116.459742°E

Ambassador of South Sudan to China
- Incumbent; Michael Milli Husein since January 22, 2015
- Inaugural holder: Yokwe Eluzai Moga
- Formation: October 9, 2012

The South Sudanese Ambassador in Beijing is the official representative of the Government in Juba to the Government of the People's Republic of China.

== List of representatives ==
diplomatic agreement/designated/Diplomatic accreditation	ambassador	Observations	List of heads of state of South Sudan	Premier of the People's Republic of China	Term end
July 9, 2011		Independence of South Sudan. The governments in Juba and Beijing established diplomatic relations.	Salva Kiir	Wen Jiabao	
October 9, 2012	Yokwe Eluzai Moga		Salva Kiir	Wen Jiabao	March 28, 2014
January 22, 2015	Michael Milli Husein	He previously was Minister of Education.	Salva Kiir	Li Keqiang	
