= Ralph Recto =

Filipino politician

- Official portrait, 2026

41st Executive Secretary of the Philippines
- Ad interim
- Assumed office November 17, 2025
- President: Bongbong Marcos
- Preceded by: Lucas Bersamin

33rd Secretary of Finance
- In office January 12, 2024 – November 17, 2025
- President: Bongbong Marcos
- Preceded by: Benjamin Diokno
- Succeeded by: Frederick Go

Deputy Speaker of the House of Representatives
- In office July 27, 2022 – January 12, 2024 Serving with several others
- Speaker: Martin Romualdez
- Succeeded by: David Suarez

Member of the House of Representatives from Batangas
- In office June 30, 2022 – January 12, 2024
- Preceded by: Vilma Santos
- Succeeded by: Ryan Christian Recto
- Constituency: 6th district
- In office June 30, 1992 – June 30, 2001
- Preceded by: Jose E. Calingasan
- Succeeded by: Oscar Gozos
- Constituency: 4th district

Senate Minority Leader
- In office July 25, 2016 – February 27, 2017
- Preceded by: Juan Ponce Enrile
- Succeeded by: Franklin Drilon

President pro tempore of the Senate of the Philippines
- In office February 27, 2017 – June 30, 2022
- Preceded by: Franklin Drilon
- Succeeded by: Migz Zubiri (acting)
- In office July 22, 2013 – June 30, 2016
- Preceded by: Jinggoy Estrada
- Succeeded by: Franklin Drilon

Senator of the Philippines
- In office June 30, 2010 – June 30, 2022
- In office June 30, 2001 – June 30, 2007

12th Director-General of the National Economic and Development Authority; Concurrently Secretary of Socioeconomic Planning
- In office July 23, 2008 – August 16, 2009
- President: Gloria Macapagal Arroyo
- Preceded by: Romulo Neri; Augusto Santos (acting)
- Succeeded by: Cayetano Paderanga Jr.; Augusto Santos (acting)

First Gentleman of Batangas
- Incumbent
- In role June 30, 2025
- Governor: Vilma Santos
- Preceded by: Angelica Chua-Mandanas
- In role June 30, 2007 – June 30, 2016
- Governor: Vilma Santos
- Preceded by: Edna Sanchez
- Succeeded by: Regina Reyes Mandanas

Personal details
- Born: Ralph Gonzalez Recto; January 11, 1964 (age 62) Quezon City, Philippines
- Party: Nacionalista (1992–1995; 2004–2007; 2018–present)
- Other political affiliations: Liberal (2009–2018); Lakas (1995–2004; 2007–2009)
- Spouse: Vilma Santos (m. 1992)
- Children: Ryan Recto
- Parents: Rafael Recto (father); Carmen Gonzalez-Recto (mother)
- Education: De La Salle University (BS)
- Occupation: Politician, government official
- Website: Official website

Ralph Gonzalez Recto (Tagalog pronunciation: [gonˈsalɛs ˈrɛktɔ]; born January 11, 1964) is a Filipino politician who has served as the executive secretary on an ad interim basis since 2025 under President Bongbong Marcos. He previously served as the 33rd secretary of finance from 2024 to 2025 under President Marcos, the representative for Batangas' 6th district from 1992 to 2001 and from 2022 to 2024, and as the House deputy speaker from 2022 to 2024.

Recto also previously served three terms in the Senate: from 2001 to 2007 and from 2010 to 2022, and he had served as president pro tempore of the Senate and Senate minority leader. He started his political career as the representative of Batangas' 4th district from 1992 to 2001.

In 2007, Recto lost his Senate re-election bid because, as many analysts believed, he had authored the unpopular EVAT (Expanded Value Added Tax) law. In July 2008, he was appointed to head the National Economic and Development Authority (NEDA) in the Arroyo administration but resigned from his position in August 2009 in preparation for another run for the Senate in the 2010 elections.

He is a grandson of statesman Claro M. Recto. His wife is actress-politician Vilma Santos.

== Early life ==
Ralph Recto comes from a political family. He was born to parents Rafael Recto (1931–2008), a sportsman and politician who participated in the 1986 coup attempt at the Manila Hotel, and Carmen Gonzalez-Recto (1941–2013).

His grandfather, the late nationalist and statesman Claro M. Recto, was a senator for several terms. Ralph is one of the three children of Carmen Gonzalez-Recto, alongside Richard "Ricky" Recto Jr. and Roxanne "Plinky" Recto. Ricky served as former vice governor of Batangas, while Plinky is an actress and television host.

== Education ==
Recto acquired a Bachelor of Science in commerce at the De La Salle-College of Saint Benilde, in 1989. At that time, Benilde was still a constituent college of De La Salle University. In 1990, he entered the College of Public Administration of the University of the Philippines Diliman to study Master of Public Administration, but only earned 36 academic units, hence unable to finish the graduate degree. Recto later took the Strategic Business Economics Program (SBEP) at the University of Asia and the Pacific in 1993, where he acquired a postgraduate Certificate in Business Economics (CBE), which was awarded to participants who exited the program without completing the thesis requirement in lieu of a master’s degree.

Recto took up a 6-day Certificate of Leadership Scholarship Course at the John F. Kennedy School of Government or Harvard Kennedy School of Harvard University, Boston, Massachusetts, United States in 1997.

== House of Representatives ==
=== First three terms (1992–2001) ===
Recto was the youngest-elected member of the House of Representatives during the 9th Congress. He is also the youngest elective official of his term. He also holds an unprecedented record in the congressional election history of Batangas for winning in all precincts, barangays, and municipalities, together with Lipa City, in the 1995 and 1998 elections. He garnered 98% of the votes cast in those two elections in the 4th District of Batangas.

During his first three terms (from 1992 to 2001) as a member of the House of Representatives, most of his legislative measures enacted into law deal with economic reforms and poverty alleviation, among which are the Social Reform and Poverty Alleviation Act; the Philippine Economic Zone Law; Amendment to the Special Economic Zone Law; the Retail Trade Liberalization Law; Regional Headquarters Law; and the Comprehensive Tax Reform Law.

=== Return (2022–2024) ===
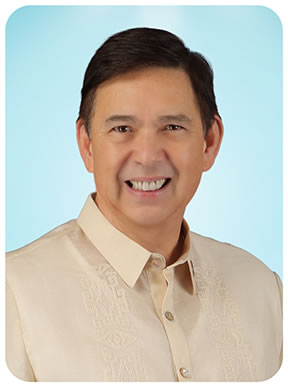
Official portrait of Recto during the 19th Congress

Upon being term-limited in the Senate, in 2022, Recto ran for a comeback to the House of Representatives, this time at the 6th district of Batangas, which consists of only the city of Lipa. He then won the election unopposed, succeeding his wife Vilma Santos.

On July 27, 2022, Recto was named as a House Deputy Speaker under the speakership of Martin Romualdez.

Recto subsequently resigned as representative following his appointment as finance secretary by President Bongbong Marcos in January 2024. Speaker Martin Romualdez served as the caretaker of Recto's congressional seat until the 2025 election.

== Senate ==
=== First term (2001–2007) ===
Recto was elected to the Senate in 2001, becoming the youngest Senator of the 12th Congress at the age of 37. In the Senate, he chaired the Committees on Ways and Means and on Trade and Industry.

He was co-chairman of the Congressional Oversight Committees on the Proper Implementation of the National Internal Revenue Code (NIRC) and on the Official Development Assistance (ODA). He was also chairman of the Accounts committee.

=== Second term (2010–2016) ===
He was proclaimed as one of the winning senatorial candidates of the 2010 Senate elections.

On July 22, 2013, at the start of the first day of the 1st Regular Session of the Senate for the 16th Congress, Recto was elected Senate President Pro-Tempore, the second highest post in the Senate and was also the Chairman of the Senate Committee on Science and Technology and member of the bicameral Commission on Appointments.

=== Third term (2016–2022) ===
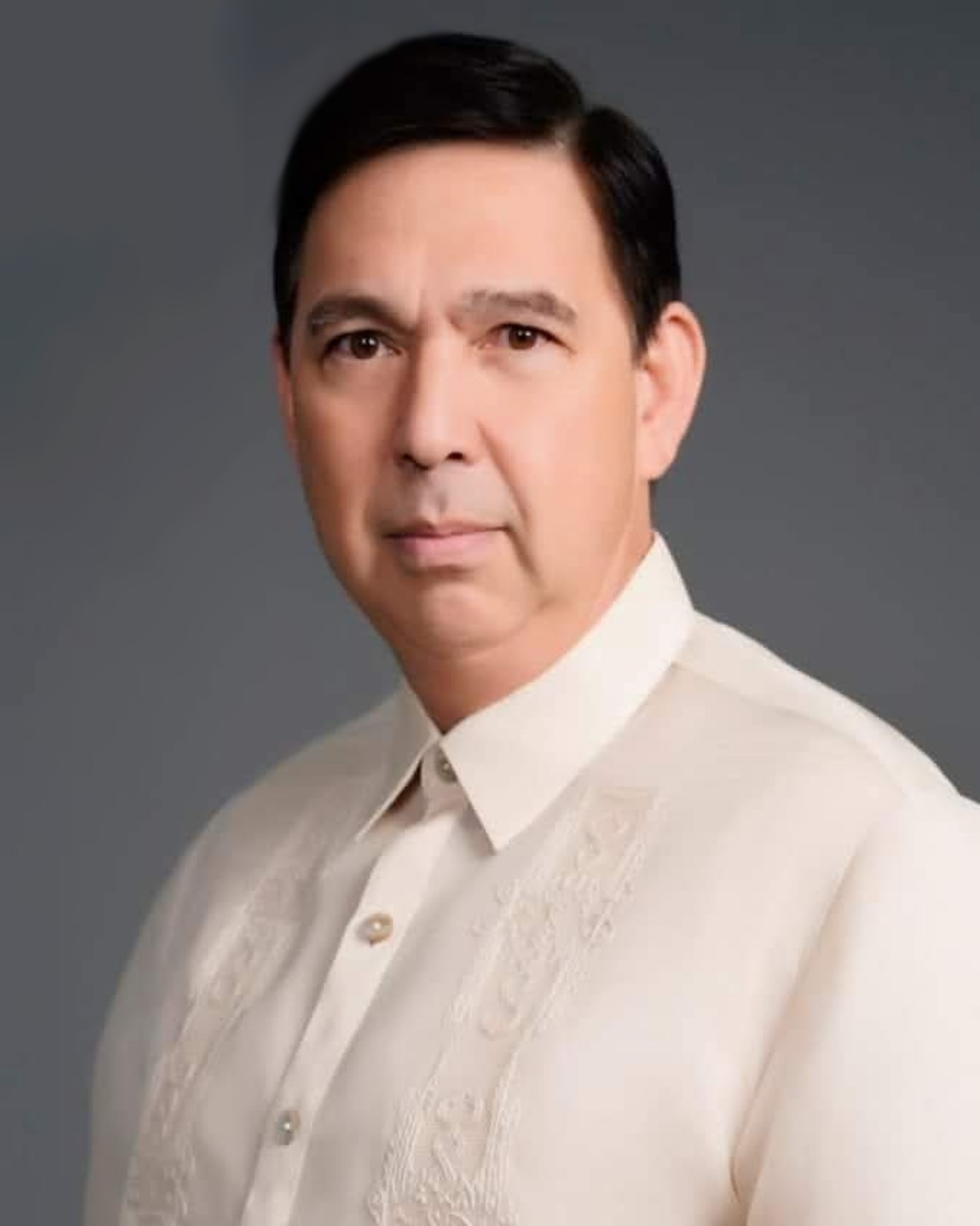
Official portrait of Ralph Recto as a Philippine Senator, c. 2019

Recto ran for re-election in the 2016 Senate election under the Koalisyon ng Daang Matuwid of Liberal standard bearer and presidential nominee Mar Roxas and won placing 11th in the polls.

On the opening day of the 17th Congress, July 25, 2016, Senator Francis Escudero nominated Recto for the presidency. Senator Antonio Trillanes IV seconded Escudero's nomination. During nominal voting, Koko Pimentel and Recto voted for each other. After losing the vote, Recto automatically became the Minority Leader. He was joined by Escudero and Trillanes in the minority bloc.

When the Senate underwent a reorganization on February 27, 2017, Recto, after getting 17 votes, was declared Senate President Pro Tempore, replacing Franklin Drilon.

Recto kept his post as Senate President Pro Tempore in the 18th Congress.

In September 2018, Recto left the Liberal Party to re-join the Nacionalista Party.

== National Economic and Development Authority (2008–2009) ==
After his failed bid for re-election to the Senate in 2007, Recto joined the board of the Union Bank of the Philippines.

He is said to have been offered the position of Secretary of Finance but it was subsequently denied by Malacañang.

President Gloria Macapagal Arroyo, on July 23, 2008, named him as the new director-general of National Economic and Development Authority, replacing Augusto Santos, acting NEDA chief. On August 11, 2009, he resigned as NEDA secretary and Presidential Adviser for Economic Planning, in preparation for another run for Senate in the 2010 election.

== Cabinet of Bongbong Marcos ==
=== Finance secretary (2024–2025) ===
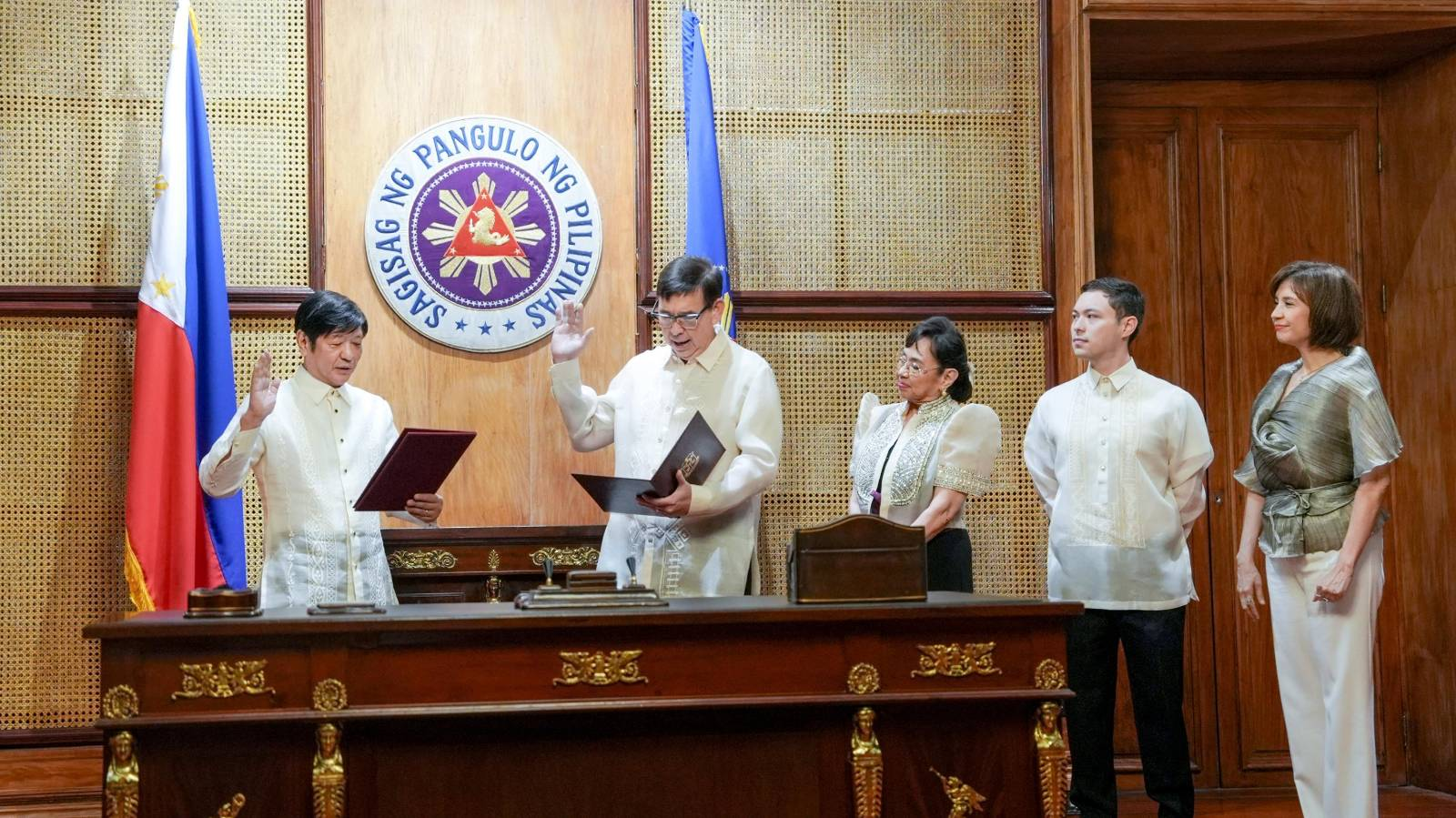
Recto taking the oath as Finance Secretary before President Bongbong Marcos on Malacañan Palace, January 12, 2024.

On January 11, 2024, within his 60th birthday, Recto was appointed by President Bongbong Marcos as the secretary of finance. He took his oath of office on January 12, 2024, succeeding Benjamin Diokno, while eventually vacating the posts of the House Deputy Speaker and the House Representative of the 6th district of Batangas, simultaneously. The Commission on Appointments confirmed Recto's appointment as finance secretary on March 13, 2024.

On May 22, 2025, President Marcos ordered members of his cabinet to tender their courtesy resignations in the aftermath of the May 12, 2025 midterm elections. Recto complied to this order. He will continue to serve as secretary until President Marcos accepts his resignation, if the President does so.

=== Executive secretary (2025–present) ===
On November 17, 2025, presidential press officer Claire Castro announced that Recto would replace the resigned Lucas Bersamin as the executive secretary. Castro also announced that Frederick Go, who had served as Special Assistant to the President for Investment and Economic Affairs, would replace Recto as the finance secretary. Since the announcement, Recto has been serving as the executive secretary on an ad interim basis pending confirmation by the Commission on Appointments.

== Personal life ==
He is married to actress and former Batangas representative Vilma Santos-Recto, with whom he has one son, incumbent Batangas representative Ryan Recto. He is the stepfather of actor and host Luis Manzano.

== Electoral history ==
Electoral history of Ralph Recto
Year	Office	Party	Votes received				Result
Year	Office	Party	Total	%	P.	Swing	Result
1992	Representative (Batangas–4th)	Nacionalista	39,224	27.17%	1st	—N/a	Won
1995	Representative (Batangas–4th)	Lakas	148,770	96.17%	1st	—N/a	Won
1998	Representative (Batangas–4th)	Lakas	187,682	90.31%	1st	—N/a	Won
2001	Senator of the Philippines	Lakas	10,480,940	35.56%	12th	—N/a	Won
2007	Senator of the Philippines	Lakas	10,721,252	36.34%	14th	—N/a	Lost
2010	Senator of the Philippines	Liberal	12,436,960	32.60%	8th	—N/a	Won
2016	Senator of the Philippines	Liberal	14,271,868	31.73%	11th	—N/a	Won
2022	Representative (Batangas–6th)	Nacionalista	161,540	100.00%	1st	—N/a	Unopposed

== See also ==
- Tau Gamma Phi

House of Representatives of the Philippines
Preceded by Jose Calingasan	Member of the Philippine House of Representatives from Batangas' 4th District; 1992–2001	Succeeded by Oscar Gozos
Preceded by Vilma Santos	Member of the Philippine House of Representatives from Batangas' 6th district 2022–2024	Succeeded by Ryan Recto
Political offices
Preceded by Romulo Neri	Secretary of the National Economic and Development Authority; 2008–2009	Succeeded by Cayetano Paderanga Jr.
Preceded by Benjamin Diokno	Secretary of Finance; 2024–2025	Succeeded by Frederick Go
Preceded by Lucas Bersamin	Executive Secretary of the Philippines (Ad interim); 2025–present	Incumbent
Senate of the Philippines
Preceded by Jinggoy Estrada	President pro tempore of the Senate of the Philippines; 2013–2016	Succeeded by Franklin Drilon
Preceded by Juan Ponce Enrile	Senate Minority Leader; 2016–2017	Succeeded by Franklin Drilon
Preceded by Franklin Drilon	President pro tempore of the Senate of the Philippines; 2017–2022	Succeeded by Migz Zubiri; Acting
Order of precedence
Preceded by Ambassadors to the Philippines (in order of tenure)	Order of Precedence of the Philippines as Executive Secretary of the Philippines (Ad interim)	Succeeded by Frederick Go as Secretary of Finance (Ad interim)
Preceded by Charles John Brown as Dean of the Diplomatic Corps	Order of Precedence of the Philippines as Executive Secretary of the Philippines (Ad interim)	Succeeded by Frederick Go as Secretary of Finance (Ad interim)
