= Lipa, Batangas =

Component city in Batangas, Philippines

Lipa
- Component city
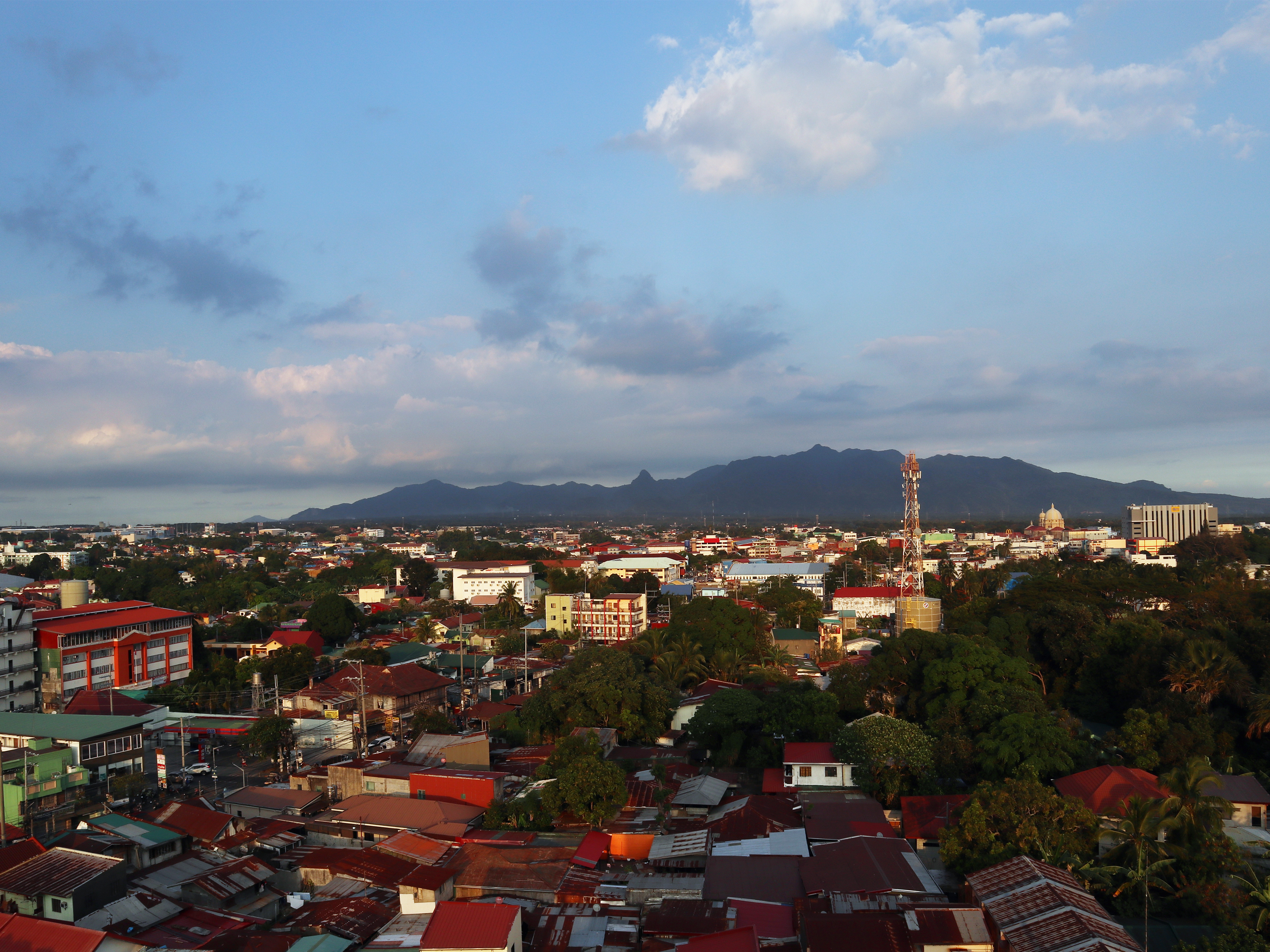
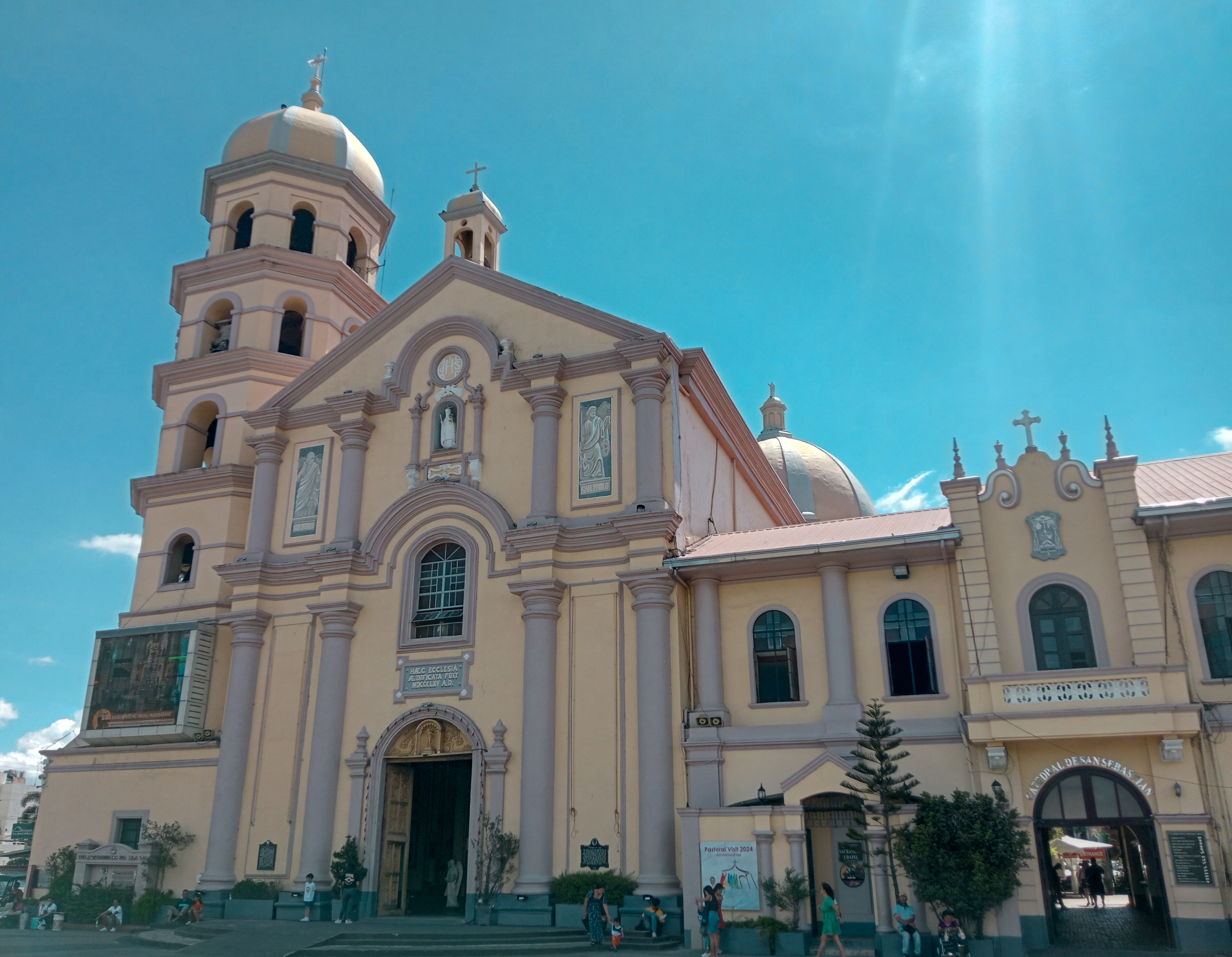
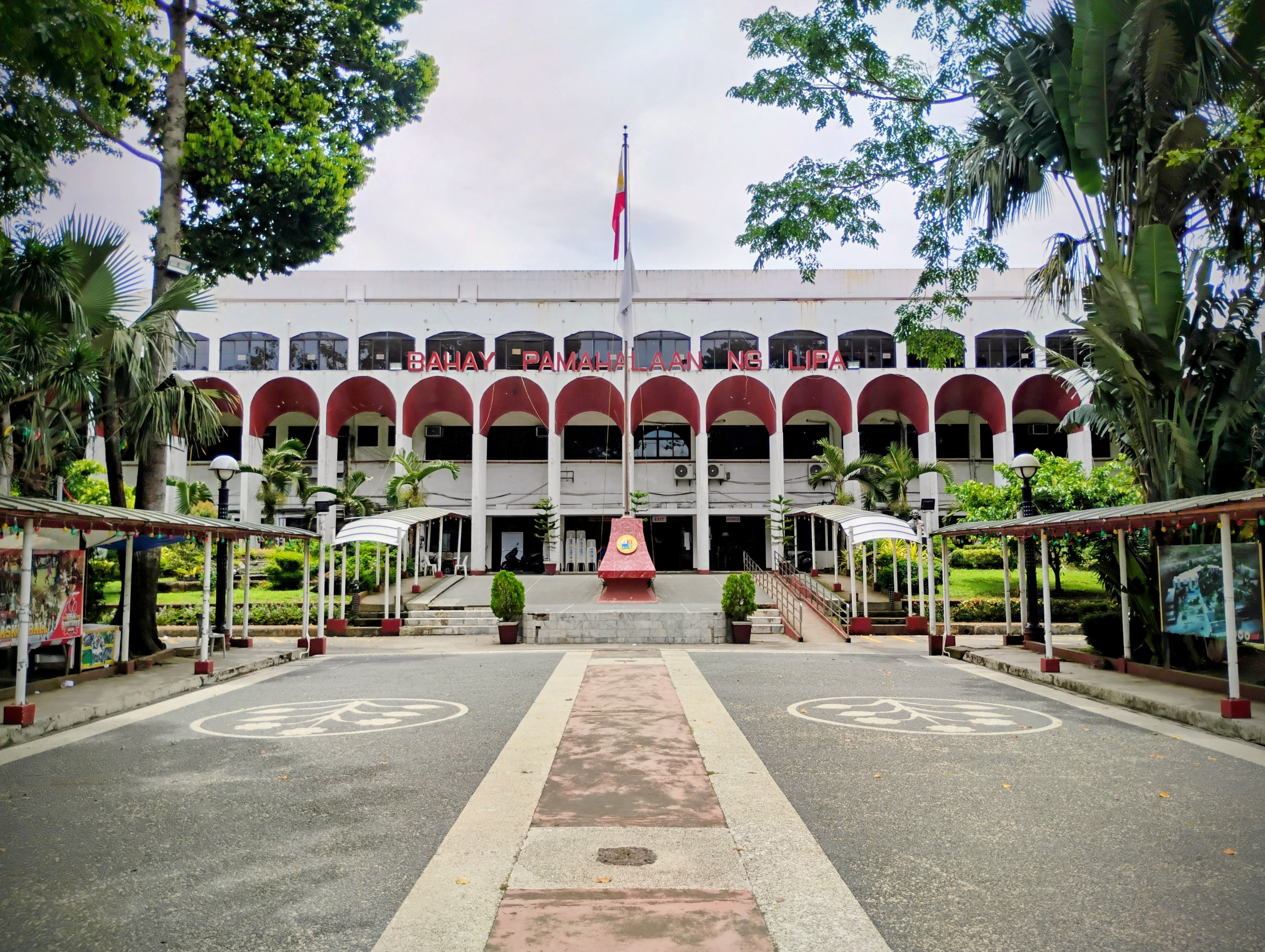
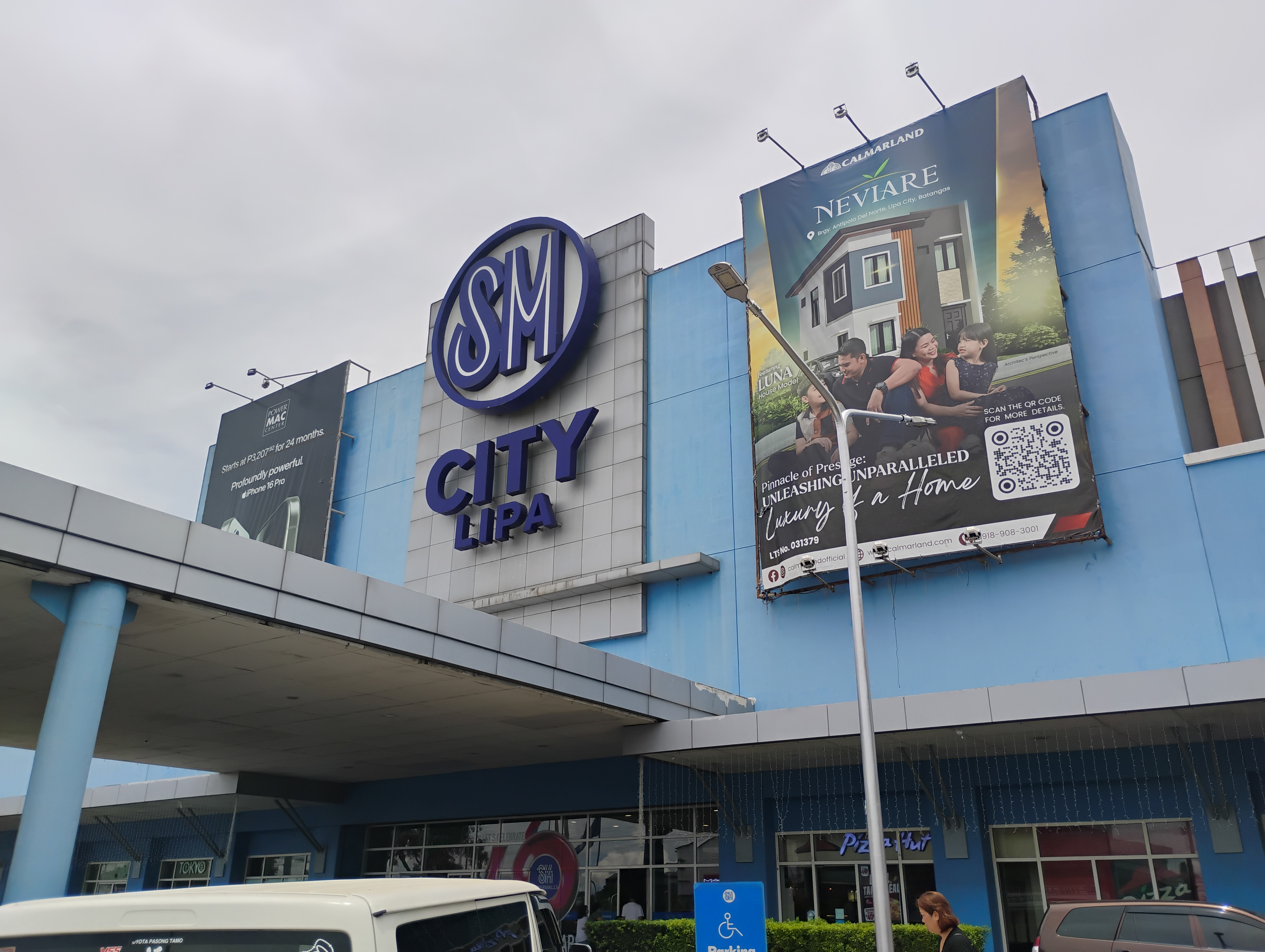
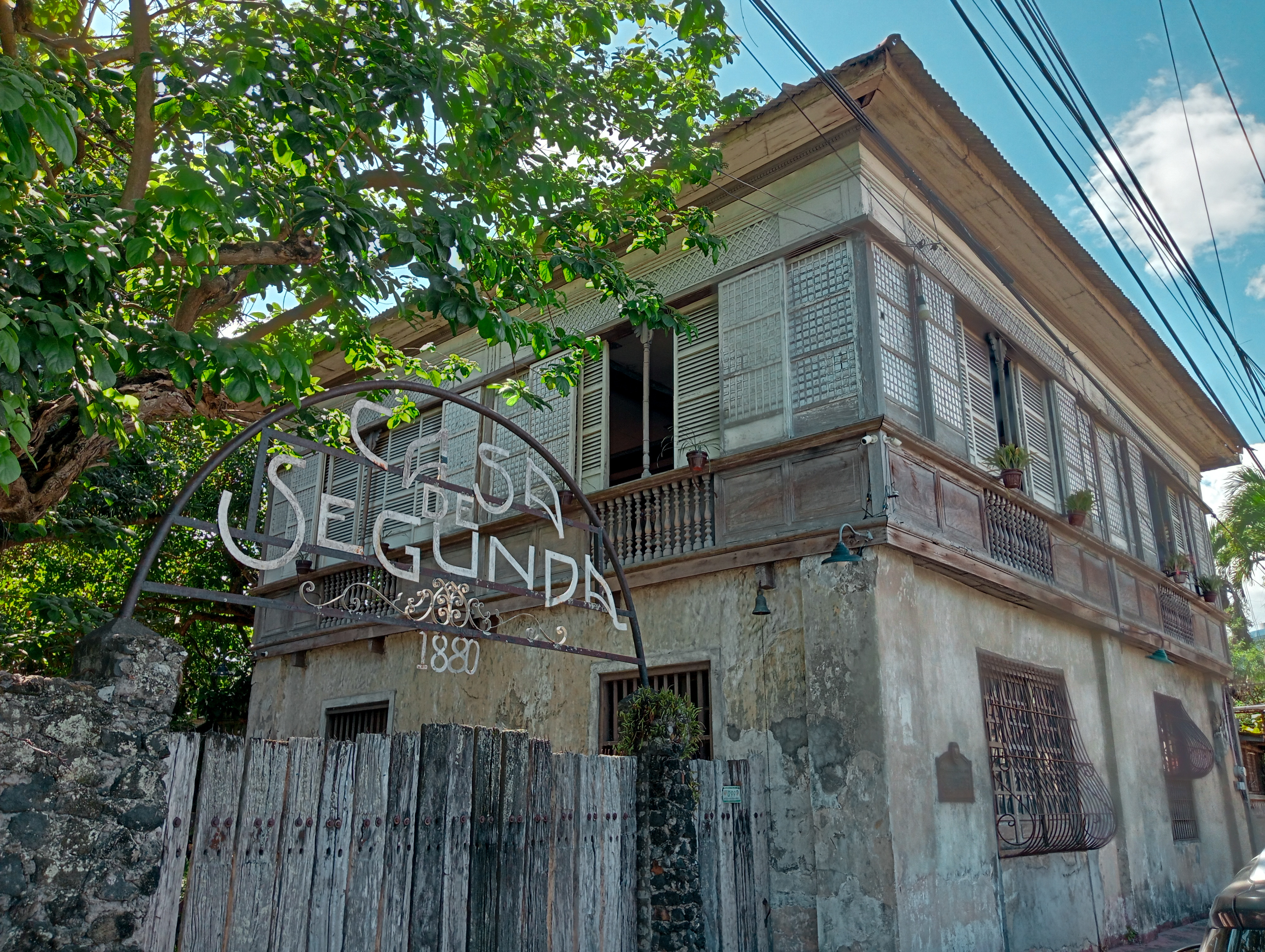
- From top to bottom: City skyline, Metropolitan Cathedral of St. Sebastian, Lipa City Hall, SM City Lipa, Casa de Segunda

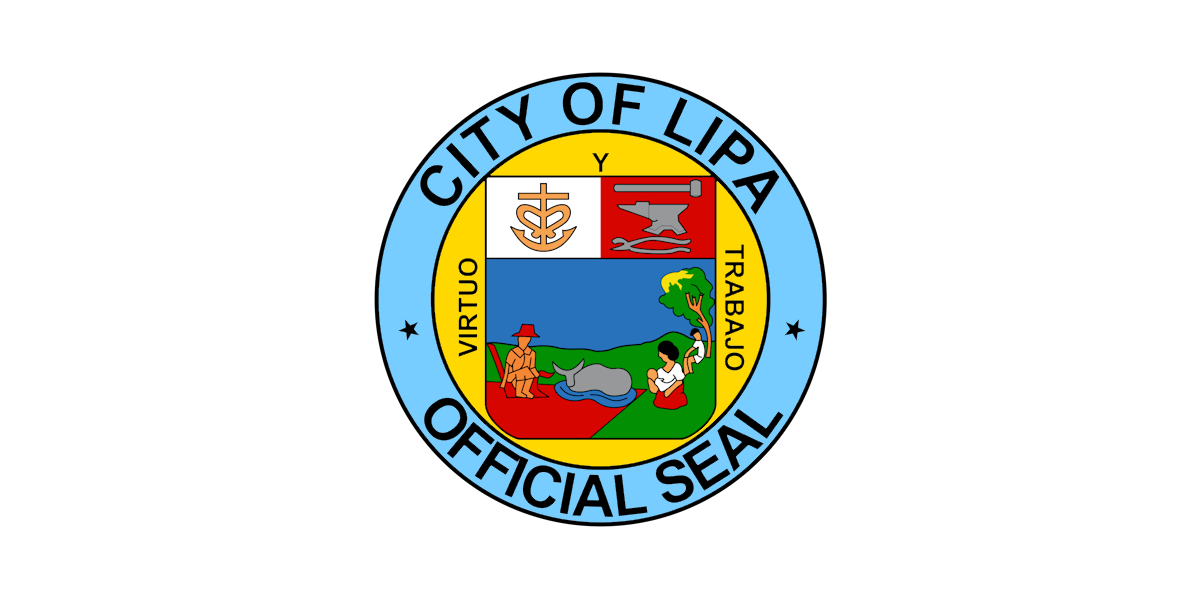
- Flag Seal
- Motto(s): Virtud y Trabajo (Virtue and Work)
- Anthem: Lipeño Hymn
- Map of Batangas with Lipa highlighted
- Interactive map of Lipa
- Location within the Philippines
- Coordinates: 13°56′28″N 121°09′44″E
- Country: Philippines
- Region: Calabarzon
- Province: Batangas
- District: 6th district
- Founded: 1702
- Cityhood: June 20, 1947
- Barangays: 72 (see Barangays)

Government
  - Type: Sangguniang Panlungsod
  - Mayor: Eric B. Africa
  - Vice Mayor: Michael Gerard T. Morada
  - Representative: Ryan Christian S. Recto
  - City Council: Members: Lydio A. Lopez Jr.; Jennifer Spye T. Toledo; Galeleo P. Angeles; Venice D. Manalo; Riofer Nicole H. Ronquillo; Miguel P. Lina III; Mark Aries P. Luancing; Joel D. Pua; Merlo P. Silva; Ralph Michael H. Umali; Leonilo A. Catipon; Aries D. Macala
  - Electorate: 257,401 voters (2025)

Area
  - Total: 209.40 km^{2} (80.85 sq mi)
- Elevation: 312 m (1,024 ft)
- Highest elevation: 985 m (3,232 ft)
- Lowest elevation: 5 m (16 ft)

Population (2024 census)
  - Total: 387,392
  - Density: 1,850.0/km^{2} (4,791.5/sq mi)
  - Households: 89,993

Economy
  - Income class: 1st city income class
  - Poverty incidence: 4.96% (2023)
  - Revenue: ₱ 4,618 million (2024)
  - Assets: ₱ 7,171 million (2024)
  - Expenditure: ₱ 1,800 million (2024)
  - Liabilities: ₱ 1,568 million (2024)

Service provider
  - Electricity: Batangas 2 Electric Cooperative (BATELEC 2)
- Time zone: UTC+8 (PST)
- ZIP code: 4217, 4218
- PSGC: 041014000
- IDD : area code: +63 (0)43
- Native languages: Tagalog
- Numbered highways: E2 (STAR Tollway); N4 (Jose P. Laurel Highway); N431
- Feast date: January 20
- Catholic diocese: Archdiocese of Lipa
- Patron saint: Saint Sebastian
- Website: www.lipa.gov.ph

Lipa ([lɪˈpa]), officially the City of Lipa (Filipino: Lungsod ng Lipa), is a component city in the province of Batangas, Philippines. According to the 2024 census, it has a population of 387,392 people.

It is the first city with a charter in the province and one of five cities in Batangas alongside Batangas City, Calaca, Santo Tomas, and Tanauan. It is located 78 kilometres (48 mi) south of Manila and is the most populous city of Batangas.

The Southern Tagalog Arterial Road (STAR) and South Luzon Expressway (SLEX) provide access to Batangas City and Metro Manila.

== Etymology ==
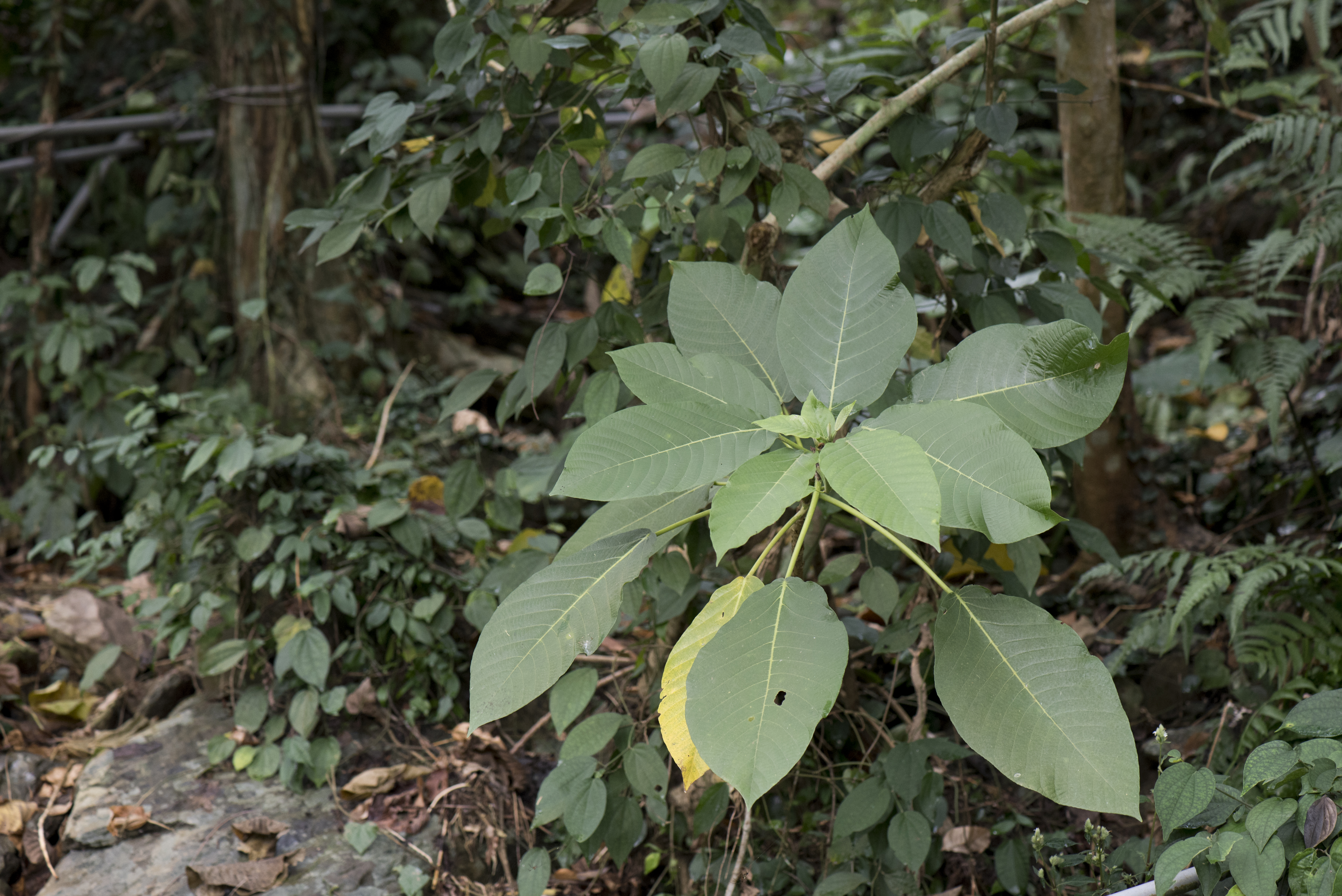
Dendrocnide meyeniana, locally known as lipa, the source of the name of the city

The city is named after Dendrocnide meyeniana, a deciduous shrub or tree native to the Philippines, which is known for the stinging trichomes on its twigs.

Batangueños from the early years had their settlement in Bombon Lake and began dispersing to other places when the volcano erupted. While a group of people was moving to another settlement area, the image of St. Sebastian was stolen from them and later on was found on a tree called "lipa." People believed that the patron saint wished to name that place "Lipa".

== History ==
The primal composition in the southeastern region of Bombon Lake were elements of the dispersed colonial families founded by two datus, namely, Dumangsil and Balkasusa in Taal, Batangas, between the 10th and 13th century. These pioneer settlers under the leadership of the fleeing Datu Puti, formerly purchased the lowlands from King Marikudo of Panay.

It is however subject to conjecture whether the pre-historic Negritos 12,000 to 15,000 years age or the much later waves of Austronesian seafarers from 5,000 to 300 B.C. were able to settle along the coasts of Batangas into the inner lake region of Taal which was accessible to navigation through the Pansipit River, thus, the possibility of miscegenetic marriages and cross culture among the aboriginal inhabitants, the old settlers and the later Dumangsil and Balkasusa clans, or whether violent wars have been waged between the old inhabitants and new colonizers is uncertain as well.

Out of this Bornean tribe of the Dumangsil and Balkasusa clans came the ancestry of Lipa and as later on, their descendants who spread out towards Laguna de Bay and Bicol Peninsula. The remains excavated from their ancient settlements in Butong, Taal, Calatagan and Balayan attest to the fact of their presence in the said site at least in the latter part of the 13th century down to the coming of Goiti and Legaspi in Batangas in 1570. The flourishing trade relations between these early Batangueños with a number of Chinese merchants prior to the Spanish conquest explained the presence of hundreds of Chinese wares from potteries to stonewares and vases of Song dynasty period to the latter part of the 16th century, in the burial grounds at Calatagan sites of Pulung Bakaw, Kay Tomas, Pinagpatayan I and II at Butong, all in Taal, Batangas.

By origin the early Lipeños were Buddhist in religion and Indian in civilization. With its not infrequent contact with the Chinese traders, the Batangueños have absorbed and been influenced too by China. With the Spanish colonization of the Philippines and the Salcedo conquest of Batangas in 1572, the Lipeños were forced to embrace Western civilization.

=== Spanish rule ===
At the coming of the Spaniards to Batangas in 1570, the Malay settlements along the southern shores of Taal Lake at Tagbakin was inhabited by the warlike descendants of the two datus called the Tagalogs. In 1605, after Marshall Gabriel de Rivera received the encomienda of Bombon, the Augustinian Fathers made Tagbakin the first settlement of the Lipeños and a mission center with the name of San Sebastian, perhaps after the installed Patron Saint, which continued to the present. The settlement was made a regular municipality in 1702 and a regular parish in 1716 with Fray Diego de Alday as the first curate.

With the eruption of Taal Volcano in 1724, the people moved to what is now "Lumang Lipa" (part of present-day Mataasnakahoy) and, again, in 1754, they moved to Balete where they settled for two years until 1756 when they moved inland to the present site obviously for more security from volcanic eruptions. When Don Galo de los Reyes was the governadorcillo of Lipa, he introduced the cultivation of coffee. The seeds of the Arabica species were said to be of two chupas brought in from Mexico by an Augustinian missionary. The coffee industry so flourished and made Lipa the richest municipality in the country with an annual income of ₱4,000,000.00 that on October 21, 1887, the Queen regent Maria Christina, acting for the young King Alfonso XIII, signed a decree elevating Lipa to a city known as "Villa de Lipa", and later authorized to use a coat of arms by the Royal Overseas Minister Don Víctor Balaguer.

At the celebration of the elevation of Lipa to a city in January 1888, José Rizal was invited by Dr. Jose Lozada, Catalino Dimayuga and the brothers Celestino and Simeon Luz but Rizal responded only with his Hymno Al Trabajo which he dedicated to the zeal and industry of the Lipeños.

The raising of cacao was introduced in Lipa by an Augustinian priest, Father Ignacio de Mercado, and that was the beginning of its cultivation throughout the Philippines.

The Lipeños also engaged themselves in livestock raising and varied home crafts for men, and small industries, like weaving, embroidery and sewing for women. After World War II, citrus production prevailed until 1970 and, after its decline, about 1965, poultry and swine raising began to take roots and to thrive in no small degree until the present.

The first newspaper in Batangas, published in Spanish, was the Lumubog-Lumutang, printed in Lipa in 1889, and established by the well-known writers Cipriano Kalaw, Gregorio Katigbak, Benito Reyes, Hugo Latorre and Pedro Laygo. Other pioneer Spanish writers were Bernardo Solis, Catalino Dimayuga, and Manuel Luz.

During the revolution, Gregorio Aguilera Solis edited a newspaper Columnas Voluntas de la Federacion Malaya. This paper became the media for notable poems and literary works of Albino Dimayuga, Baldomero Roxas, Luis Lina Kison, Bernardo Solis, Benedicto Solis, Emiliano Manguiat and Petronio Katigbak.

Roman Dimayuga wrote plays, while Pedro Laygo published articles on domestic and international politics, and Tomas Umali on military affairs. Hispanistas during the American regime included national figures like Teodoro Kalaw, Fidel Reyes, Arsenio Luz, Maximo Bernardo Solis, Enrique Laygo, and Claro M. Recto. Lipeños also served in the Revolutionary Republic. These were Gregorio Aguilera who was a delegate to the Malolos Congress; Ceferino Pantoja, also a member of that congress; Jose Lozada, as envoy to Washington, D.C., and Paris, and Cipriano Kalaw, the first vice-president and Treasurer of the Central Committee of Hong Kong.

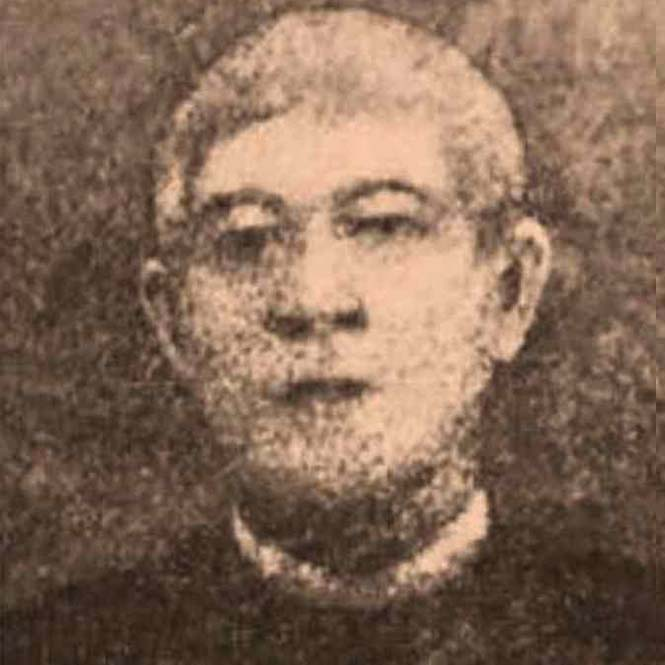
Father Valerio Malabanan established a historical school that produced future leaders like Apolinario Mabini and Miguel Malvar

In the field of education, Father Valerio Malabanan was foremost among Lipeños who established schools. Others were Sebastian Virrey, Jacinto Silva, Candido Lantin and Gregorio Katigbak. In 1894, Brigido Morada established his own school at his house in Mataas na Lupa. Under Father Valerio Malabanan were such well-known figures as Apolinario Mabini, General Miguel Malvar and Sotero Laurel.

Sebastian Virrey countered with such former students as the brothers Alfonso and Claro M. Recto; Fidel and Carmelo Reyes; Teodoro and Maximo Kalaw; Pacifico, Jose and Enrique Laygo; and Manuel Luz Roxas, Jose D. Dimayuga, Bernabe Africa, Pablo Borbon, Potenciano Malvar, Leoncio Aranda and Bishop Alfredo Obviar.

The later school, perhaps marked for permanence by the enthusiastic patronage of its high standard maintained through the years since its founding in 1922 until the present, is the Mabini Academy established by Dr. Jose Ma. Katigbak, Randall A. Rowley, Tarcila Malabanan-Katigbak and Emilia Malabanan. The fact that Lipeños, even up to the present, are very religious, may be attributed to the fact that Fr. Benito Baras, who was Parish Priest of Lipa for almost three decades (1865–1894), has considered Villa de Lipa as his very own and had shown great paternal love for the Lipeños that he constructed the Parish Church (now Cathedral of the Archdiocese of Lipa) and a new and bigger cemetery with a chapel.

A plaque of dedication to the opening and blessing of the new Campo Santo De Lipa (Cemetery of Lipa) can still be seen at the archway of the entrance, an attestment of Fr. Benito Baras' dedication to the people of Villa de Lipa. Moreover, without aid from the State, he constructed the bridge at Sabang and the road that served as a national highway to Manila and Laguna.

=== American occupation ===
The Parish of Lipa, established in 1716, became a diocesan center in 1910, included the provinces of Batangas, Laguna, Tayabas (Quezon), Marinduque and Mindoro, with Msgr. Jose Petrelli as the first bishop.

Barrios Luta, Bilukaw, Kalikangan (Caligañgan), Payapa, and San Gallo (San Galo) were excised from Lipa to form the new independent municipality of Malvar by virtue of an Executive Order issued by acting Governor-General Charles Yeater on December 16, 1918, with the municipality's inauguration taking effect on January 10, 1919. Mataasnakahoy, which includes Lumang Lipa, likewise became a separate municipality through Executive Order No. 308 signed by acting Governor-General of the Philippines George C. Butte on March 27, 1931, taking effect on January 1, 1932.

=== Cityhood ===
On August 31, 1947, Lipa was inaugurated as a chartered City created under Republic Act No. 162 approved on June 20, 1947.

On June 21, 1969, barrios Alangilan, Balete, Calawit, Looc, Magapi, Makina, Malabanan, Palsara, Sampalukan, and Solis, along with sitios Paligawan, Sala, and Wani-Wani, were excised from Lipa to form part of the new independent municipality of Balete, by virtue of Republic Act No. 5659.

== Geography ==
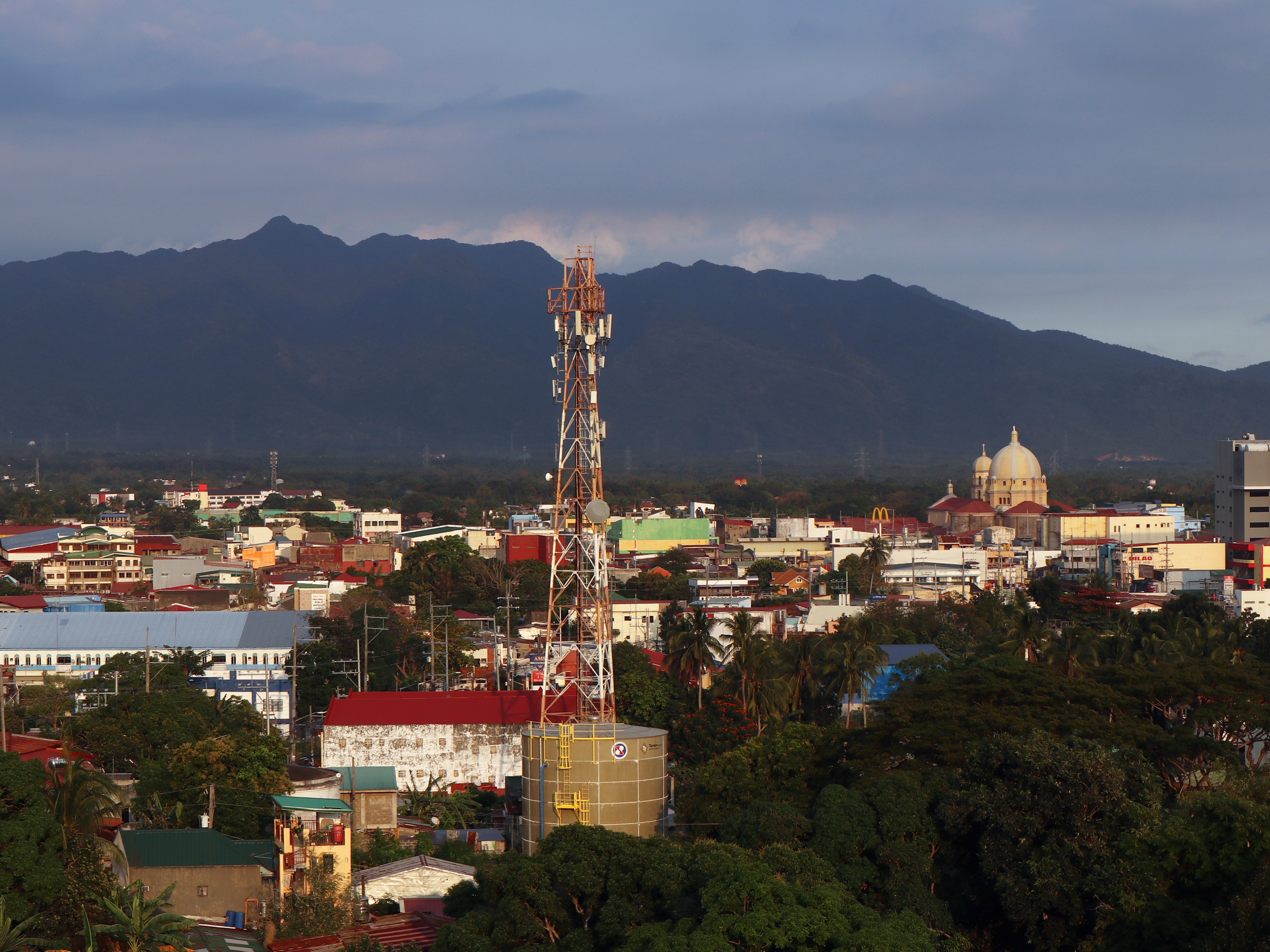
View of Lipa from Barangay Mataas na Lupa

Lipa covers an area of 20,940 hectares (209.4 km^{2}) at an elevation of 1,025 feet (312 m) above sea level. Lipa's fishing area is located at barangay Halang, in the west of the city; it is actually a portion of Taal Lake, which is connected to other municipalities (Cuenca, Mataasnakahoy and Balete).

Lipa is bounded by the city of Santo Tomas in the northeast, the city of San Pablo of Laguna, and the municipalities of Tiaong and San Antonio, Quezon in the east, the municipalities of Padre Garcia and Rosario in the southeast, the municipalities of Ibaan and San Jose in the southwest, the municipalities of Cuenca and Mataasnakahoy and Taal Lake in the west and the municipalities of Balete and Malvar in the northwest.

The city's location, in a valley between the Malepunyo Mountain Range and Mount Macolod, makes it a low-risk area for natural disasters. These two mountains serve as a windbreak during typhoons. Mount Macolod, in the west, also served as shield during eruptions of the Taal Volcano.

=== Barangays ===
Lipa is politically subdivided into 72 barangays, as shown in the matrix below. Each barangay consists of puroks and some have sitios.

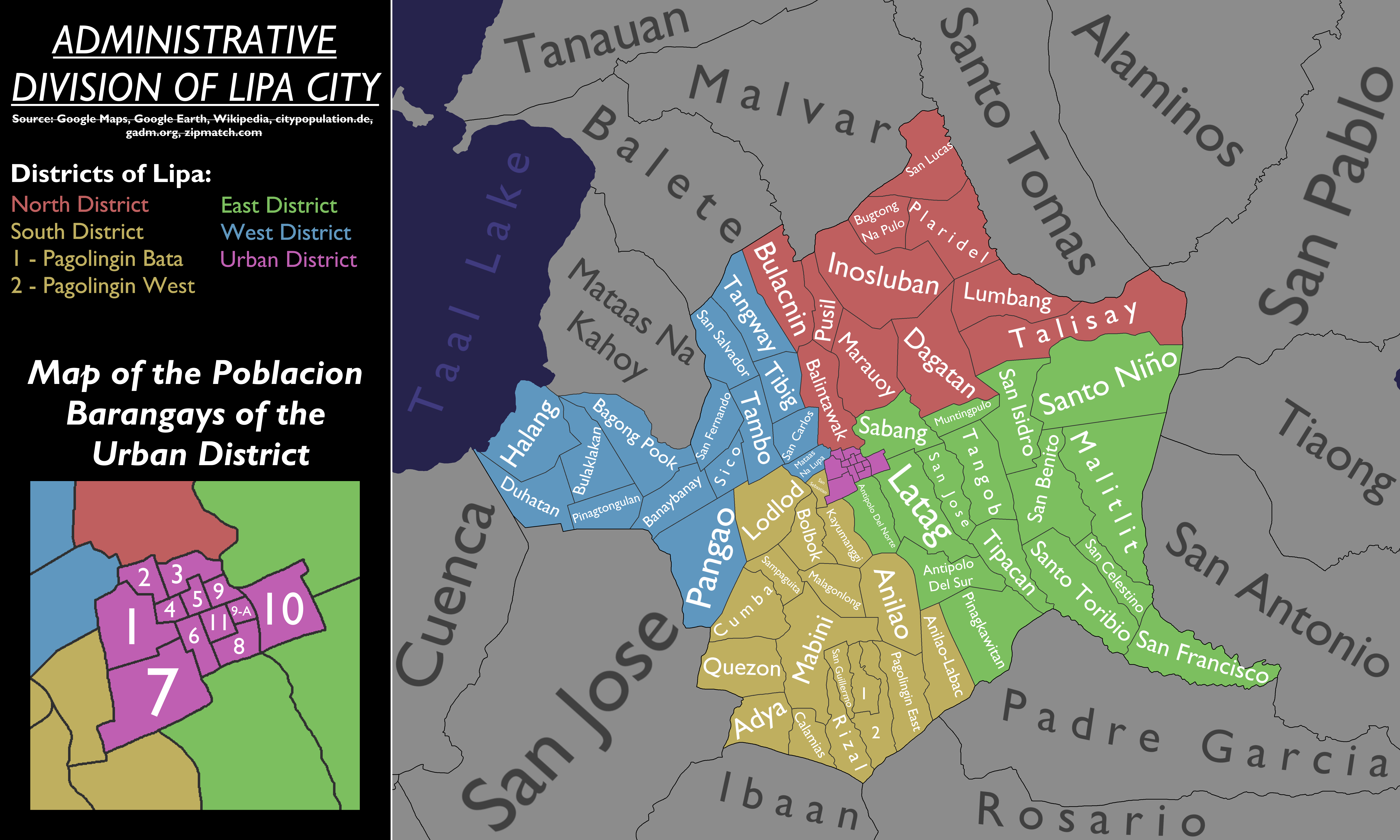
The map of Barangays of Lipa City with labels.

PSGC	Barangay	Population			±% p.a.	
		2024		2010		
041014001	Adya	0.5%	2,098	1,891	▴	0.72%
041014002	Anilao	1.1%	4,284	3,126	▴	2.20%
041014003	Anilao-Labac	1.0%	3,910	2,733	▴	2.51%
041014004	Antipolo del Norte	1.6%	6,078	5,604	▴	0.56%
041014005	Antipolo del Sur	1.9%	7,448	6,332	▴	1.13%
041014006	Bagong Pook	1.8%	7,081	5,509	▴	1.75%
041014007	Balintawak	5.0%	19,278	12,918	▴	2.81%
041014008	Banaybanay	3.3%	12,971	10,111	▴	1.74%
041014009	Barangay 12	0.4%	1,669	2,658	▾	−3.17%
041014010	Bolbok	2.3%	8,836	5,473	▴	3.37%
041014011	Bugtong na Pulo	2.0%	7,678	4,786	▴	3.32%
041014012	Bulacnin	1.9%	7,369	5,599	▴	1.92%
041014013	Bulaklakan	0.4%	1,604	1,432	▴	0.79%
041014014	Calamias	0.4%	1,651	1,103	▴	2.83%
041014015	Cumba	1.0%	3,780	2,399	▴	3.19%
041014016	Dagatan	1.8%	6,840	4,401	▴	3.10%
041014017	Duhatan	0.7%	2,579	2,106	▴	1.41%
041014018	Halang	0.6%	2,267	1,961	▴	1.01%
041014019	Inosloban	3.8%	14,904	7,910	▴	4.48%
041014020	Kayumanggi	2.0%	7,750	4,813	▴	3.35%
041014021	Latag	2.4%	9,364	4,207	▴	5.69%
041014022	Lodlod	2.6%	10,006	8,210	▴	1.38%
041014023	Lumbang	1.2%	4,688	3,735	▴	1.58%
041014024	Mabini	1.5%	5,766	3,326	▴	3.88%
041014025	Malagonlong	0.7%	2,667	2,199	▴	1.34%
041014026	Malitlit	0.7%	2,526	1,762	▴	2.52%
041014027	Marauoy	4.9%	18,794	14,107	▴	2.00%
041014028	Mataas na Lupa	1.2%	4,510	5,322	▾	−1.14%
041014029	Munting Pulo	1.3%	4,853	3,031	▴	3.31%
041014030	Pagolingin Bata	0.3%	1,236	1,206	▴	0.17%
041014031	Pagolingin East	0.6%	2,178	2,004	▴	0.58%
041014032	Pagolingin West	0.5%	2,082	1,384	▴	2.86%
041014033	Pangao	1.7%	6,568	4,507	▴	2.64%
041014034	Pinagkawitan	2.1%	8,089	6,570	▴	1.45%
041014035	Pinagtongulan	1.0%	3,803	2,908	▴	1.87%
041014036	Plaridel	1.4%	5,402	4,326	▴	1.55%
041014037	Poblacion Barangay 1	0.9%	3,512	4,147	▾	−1.14%
041014038	Poblacion Barangay 10	0.8%	2,996	2,793	▴	0.49%
041014039	Poblacion Barangay 11	0.1%	379	389	▾	−0.18%
041014040	Poblacion Barangay 2	0.8%	3,159	3,548	▾	−0.80%
041014041	Poblacion Barangay 3	0.4%	1,661	2,440	▾	−2.62%
041014042	Poblacion Barangay 4	0.1%	508	672	▾	−1.92%
041014043	Poblacion Barangay 5	0.1%	550	573	▾	−0.28%
041014044	Poblacion Barangay 6	0.1%	558	1,201	▾	−5.16%
041014045	Poblacion Barangay 7	1.2%	4,605	4,976	▾	−0.53%
041014046	Poblacion Barangay 8	0.1%	416	800	▾	−4.42%
041014047	Poblacion Barangay 9	0.1%	529	357	▴	2.76%
041014048	Poblacion Barangay 9-A	0.1%	578	835	▾	−2.51%
041014049	Pusil	0.6%	2,181	896	▴	6.34%
041014050	Quezon	0.5%	1,909	1,271	▴	2.85%
041014051	Rizal	0.9%	3,441	2,911	▴	1.16%
041014052	Sabang	5.7%	22,153	17,730	▴	1.55%
041014053	Sampaguita	2.4%	9,327	4,551	▴	5.09%
041014054	San Benito	1.2%	4,507	3,653	▴	1.46%
041014055	San Carlos	2.0%	7,759	5,368	▴	2.58%
041014056	San Celestino	0.6%	2,319	2,332	▾	−0.04%
041014057	San Francisco	0.8%	3,109	2,741	▴	0.87%
041014058	San Guillermo	0.5%	1,750	1,179	▴	2.77%
041014059	San Jose	1.8%	6,851	5,723	▴	1.25%
041014060	San Lucas	1.1%	4,233	2,422	▴	3.93%
041014061	San Salvador	1.1%	4,384	3,296	▴	1.99%
041014062	San Sebastian	0.9%	3,647	4,016	▾	−0.66%
041014063	Santo Niño	0.9%	3,343	2,680	▴	1.54%
041014064	Santo Toribio	0.9%	3,600	2,853	▴	1.62%
041014065	Sapac	1.6%	6,361	5,053	▴	1.60%
041014066	Sico	1.3%	5,206	4,183	▴	1.52%
041014067	Talisay	1.4%	5,239	4,091	▴	1.72%
041014068	Tambo	3.2%	12,572	10,106	▴	1.52%
041014069	Tangob	0.8%	3,101	1,970	▴	3.19%
041014070	Tanguay	1.3%	4,890	3,410	▴	2.52%
041014071	Tibig	1.4%	5,314	3,642	▴	2.65%
041014072	Tipacan	0.9%	3,677	2,991	▴	1.44%
	Total		387,392	372,931	▴	0.26%

San Jose was formerly known as Patay. In 1955, the sitios of Duhatan, Tagbakin, Initan, Malabong and Halang (then part of the Pinagtungolan barrio) became an independent barrio. In 1957, the sitios of Waniwani, Sayatin and Look were moved from the Balete barrio to the barrio of Look.

=== Climate ===
Climate data for Lipa
Month	Jan	Feb	Mar	Apr	May	Jun	Jul	Aug	Sep	Oct	Nov	Dec	Year
Mean daily maximum °C (°F)	28 (82)	29 (84)	30.3 (86.5)	31.7 (89.1)	31.5 (88.7)	30.5 (86.9)	29.4 (84.9)	29.2 (84.6)	29.5 (85.1)	29.6 (85.3)	28.9 (84.0)	28 (82)	29.6 (85.3)
Daily mean °C (°F)	24.1 (75.4)	24.7 (76.5)	25.7 (78.3)	26.9 (80.4)	27 (81)	26.5 (79.7)	25.6 (78.1)	25.6 (78.1)	25.7 (78.3)	25.7 (78.3)	25.2 (77.4)	24.5 (76.1)	25.6 (78.1)
Mean daily minimum °C (°F)	20.3 (68.5)	20.4 (68.7)	21.1 (70.0)	22.2 (72.0)	22.6 (72.7)	22.5 (72.5)	21.9 (71.4)	22.1 (71.8)	21.9 (71.4)	21.8 (71.2)	21.5 (70.7)	21 (70)	21.6 (70.9)
Average rainfall mm (inches)	57 (2.2)	30 (1.2)	32 (1.3)	52 (2.0)	160 (6.3)	221 (8.7)	311 (12.2)	298 (11.7)	270 (10.6)	248 (9.8)	240 (9.4)	169 (6.7)	2,088 (82.2)
Source: Climate-Data.Org

Lipa has a tropical monsoon climate (Köppen system: Am) under the Köppen climate classification, with a dry season between January and April, and rain for the rest of the year. The average yearly temperature is 25.6 °C (78.1 °F). The highest recorded temperature is 35.7 °C (96.3 °F), and the lowest recorded temperature is 16.4 °C (61.5 °F).

== Demographics ==
The population of Lipa, Batangas, in the 2024 census was 387,392 people, with a density of 1,850 inhabitants per square kilometre or 4,800 inhabitants per square mile.

Population census of Lipa

Year	Pop.	±% p.a.
1903	37,934	—
1918	46,677	+1.39%
1939	45,175	−0.16%
1948	49,884	+1.11%
1960	69,036	+2.74%
1970	93,971	+3.13%

Year	Pop.	±% p.a.
1975	106,094	+2.46%
1980	121,166	+2.69%
1990	160,117	+2.83%
1995	177,894	+1.99%
2000	218,447	+4.50%
2007	260,568	+2.46%

Year	Pop.	±% p.a.
2010	283,468	+3.11%
2015	332,386	+3.08%
2020	372,931	+2.45%
2024	387,392	+0.92%

Source: Philippine Statistics Authority

=== Language ===
Tagalog is the most widely spoken language in the city. English is the medium of instruction in schools and is widely understood and spoken especially in the business community and for official documents.

=== Religion ===
==== Catholicism ====
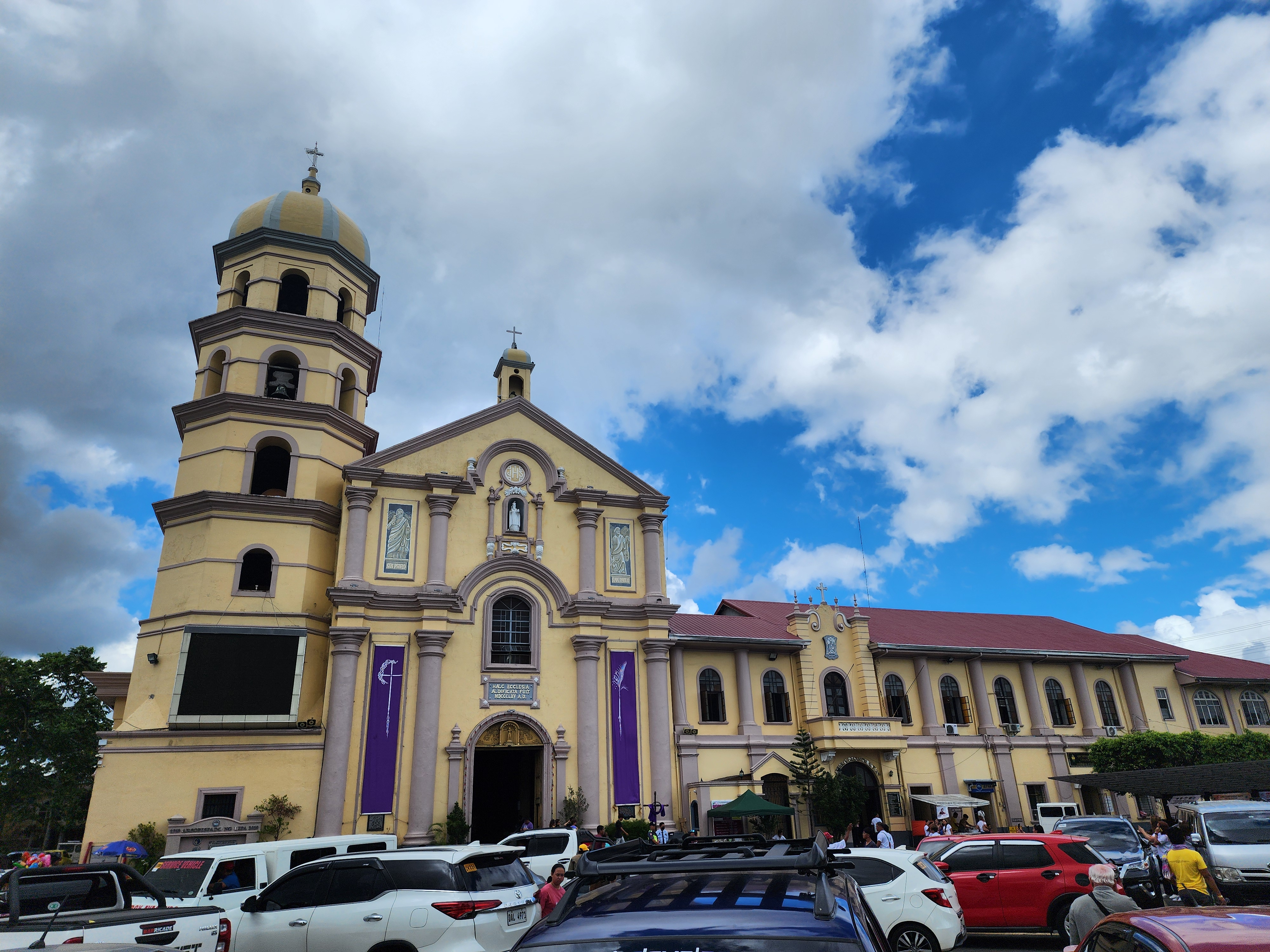
Lipa Cathedral, the seat of the Roman Catholic Archdiocese of Lipa

Majority of the city's population are Roman Catholics, and the Roman Catholic Archdiocese of Lipa today comprises the civil province of Batangas. Formed as the Diocese of Lipa on April 10, 1910, the archdiocese once covered other provinces such as Batangas, Laguna, Quezon, Marinduque and Mindoro, with Most Reverend Joseph Petrelli, D.D. as the first bishop. Currently, the archdiocese is divided into 6 vicariates, each headed by a vicar forane. There are 49 parishes in all, served by 143 priests (122 of which are diocesan), 13 religious brothers, and 197 religious sisters. There are also 23 existing Catholic schools, two high school seminaries, three college seminaries, and two pastoral centers.

The Church and Monastery of Lipa is the location of a 1940s apparition of the Virgin Mary which was seen by sister Teresing Castillo and numerous accounts of rose petal showers from the 1940s to the 1960s. Some of the rose petals, which had the silhouette of the Virgin Mary when flashed with light, have been preserved by the Diocese of Lipa and various townfolks who have witnessed the petal showers. An investigation conducted by researchers of the University of the Philippines proved that the figures on the petals were natural and not stamped by man-made means. A few years after the apparition of the Virgin Mary, the Vatican released a document stating that the apparition in Lipa was false. Despite this, the rose petal showers continued until the last apparition of Mary appeared, saying three things, of which the most important was to 'pray for China', which at the time was among the poorest regions in the world. Due to the decline of the Vatican regarding the apparition, the Diocese of Lipa ordered the destruction of Mary's statue in the church which depicted the apparition. However, the founding nuns of the church hid it instead. Decades afterwards in the 21st century, before the death of a founding nun, she wished for the statue of the apparition to be viewed by the public once more. Thousands of devotees went back to the church and since then, the statue has been in public view. During a certain event, the priest ordered a mass outside the church to bless the municipality of Lipa, where the apparition statue was brought outside as well. During that time, sun beatings from heaven, which was viewed by thousands of people during a mass outside the church, occurred. Devotees flocked Lipa afterwards, where cures for blindness and terminal sickness were cured through the usage of prayers with the preserved petals from the petal showers of the 1940s to the 1960s. In 2014, it was later found out that most of the bishops who signed in favor of declaring the apparitions of the 1940s as a lie were forced to sign such documents. This sparked the current Lipa Church to gather as much evidence to back the existence and miracles of the apparitions.

==== Protestants and other groups ====
There are other Christian groups such as various Protestant denominations including Evangelicals, Born Again, Iglesia ni Cristo, Members Church of God International (MCGI), Kingdom of Jesus Christ, Jehovah's Witnesses, Seventh-Day Adventist, and the Church of Jesus Christ of Latter-day Saints.

Other religions include Islam and Buddhism.

== Economy ==
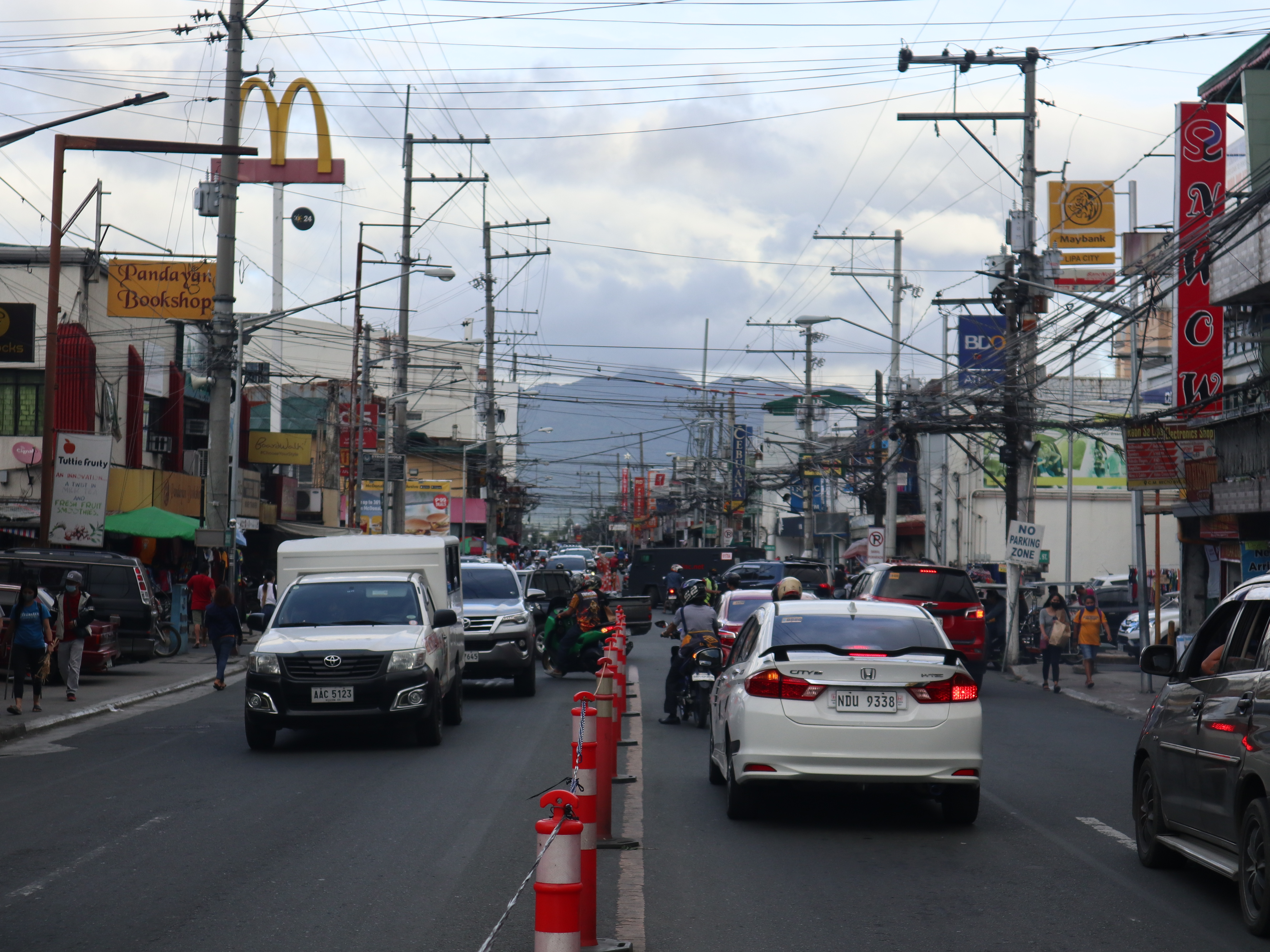
Downtown Lipa

Poverty incidence of Lipa (%)

Source: Philippine Statistics Authority

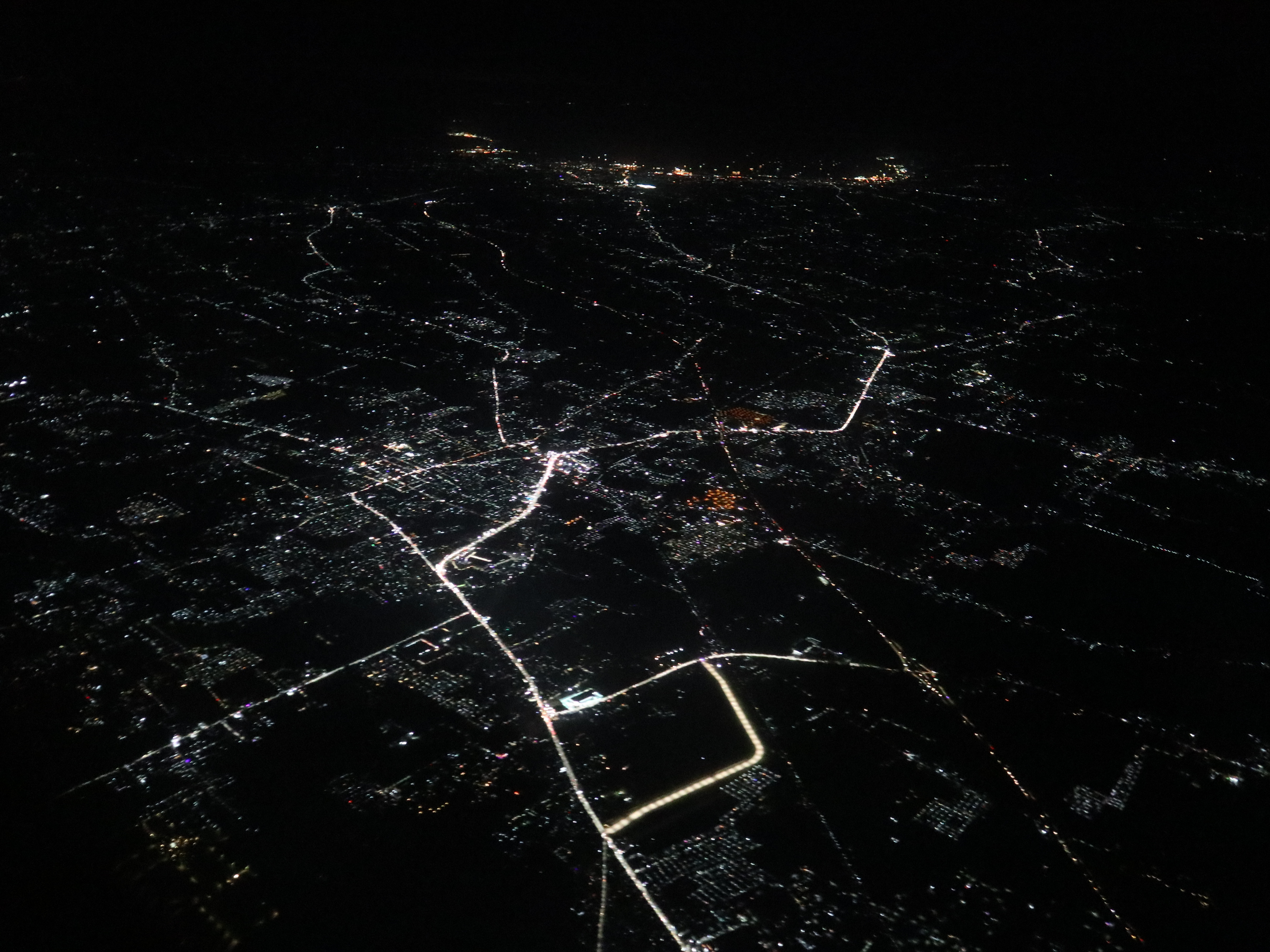
Aerial view of Lipa at night

Lipa's proximity to the country's capital, Manila, having an approximate distance of 86 kilometers (53 mi) or approximately an hour-and-half drive via the South Luzon Expressway enhances its strategic access to development trends. It is fast emerging as a key city in the province, becoming a major institutional/administrative center, medical center, commercial center, financial center, agro-industrial center and residential center.

It is identified as an ideal hub and center of the Calabarzon Agro-Industrial Region in the Regional Physical Framework Plan of Region IV-A. In the recent past, Lipa is being transformed from an agrarian to an urbanized area. A significant portion of the agricultural land area of the city has been converted to residential subdivisions, industrial area with the establishment of Lima Technology Center utilizing lands in the city and Malvar Municipality. Recently, the influx of business process outsourcing (BPO) firms such as call centers have contributed much to the growth of the local economy. BPO sites are scattered throughout the city. It ranked 6th out of 10 in the Top 10 next wave cities of 2010 by the Commission of Information and Communication Technology (ICCT). Teletech Inc. pioneered the BPO company in Lipa City in 2006. Alorica followed after few years. The most recent BPO company is The Results.

Likewise, due to a very strategic location, the Lipa City Market is comparatively busy than other neighboring towns. Thus, it boasts a large quantity of market business. As a result, it attracts more customers from neighboring towns like Padre Garcia, Rosario, Ibaan, San Juan, Malvar, Mataas na Kahoy, Balete, Cuenca, and Lemery and from the cities of Batangas, Santo Tomas and Tanauan. An S&R Membership Shopping outlet is located beside it.

It is also noticeable that Lipa City is being home to new settlers from different regions. Muslims from Mindanao for example have settled in Lipa City, primarily due to growing economy. There are also settlers from Mindoro, Bicol, Quezon and other places. Likewise, there are many Koreans who established their business in Lipa. Furthermore, it is evident that Indian Nationals are also an everyday sight.

== Culture ==
=== Food ===
A typical dish in the city is lomi, a noodle dish that emerged from the influence of early Chinese settlers. Lomi is cooked using raw noodles, cassava mixed with water, beaten egg, salt and pepper, meat, liver, among other ingredients. Restaurants serving lomi, the lomi house, appear in most barangays. However, there are a few recognized by the Lipenos, like Renfel, Kids Lomihouse, LBN, Beegees, Liam's to mention a few.

Goto is popular, a bowl of hot soup with beef, tripe, entrails, and blood, added with fish sauce and calamansi juice with chili.

The increasing influence of the cuisines of nearby provinces has introduced dishes such as sisig of Pampanga, and Bicol Express of Bicol.

Several food courts have been established.

=== Technology ===
Lipa has few technologically advanced infrastructure. PKI is one of the advanced factories that pioneered the productions in Lipa City. Since it was established in Barangay Inosluban, Lipa City was known to be an employment-friendly zone. This was followed by the establishment of LIMA Industrial Park, which houses multiple production lines. It houses various companies that employ hundreds of production workers. Not only from the city proper, it hires employees from its nearby cities like Tanauan, Rosario, Batangas, San Jose, Malvar etc. The San Benito Private Estate project is a 25-hectare integrated active wellness township in joint venture with The Farm at San Benito group in Barangay Tipacan, Lipa.

=== Museums ===
Museo de Lipa, inaugurated in November 2007, is a project of the Lipa City Tourism Council envisioned by its Past President, Lucila R. Resurreccion. On display are antique mementos such as: the Coffee Corner – an exhibit of the different tools used in coffee production; Las trajes de mestizas and ternos – gowns worn by women during the pre-war days and during festive occasions; the Satsuma Vase – a gift given by the Luna brothers to the unparalleled hospitality shown by the aristocratic couple Doña Germana Solis and Dr. Jose Lozada; and the office tables of Don Claro Mayo Recto and Mayor Carlos Solis, the 24-hour Mayor.

Other artifacts exhibited are certain collections of furniture and objects of art loaned and donated by different antique collectors and by some of the landed gentry of Lipa: antique cabinets, tables, mirrors, antique silverware chinaware, tea sets, religious images and articles, jars, and brass artifacts.

The ground floor serves as a function area and features works of several contemporary Lipeño visual artists.

=== Religious monuments ===
In 1605, Don Diego de Salcedo discovered a community of farmers living in fairly good economic conditions at Lake Bombon, now Tagbakin, Lipa City. The Augustinians among them started a religious mission called “Convent of San Sebastian in Comintang”.

However, the residents noticed that the land area- residential and agricultural-was getting smaller due to the rising waters of Taal Lake, they transferred to Balete. But the site was submerged by the lake in 1754 after the eruption of Taal Volcano. To avoid a similar occurrence, the townsfolk decided to transfer the town to a place far from the lake and the volcano. Legend has it that they agreed to pray the rosary while walking and whenever they may be at the end of the 24th mystery, there the town would be relocated. And they walked upland, away from the lake and the volcano, and at the end of the 24th mystery, they reached what is now called Mataas na Lupa. The temporary poblacion and the church were thus resettled there.

The location benefited everybody since it was along the main road that led to the coastal towns, the ground was high enough and the east winds were hedged in by high mountains. But after some time, the settlers had to seek another location due to the problem of water supply. The “better site” is the present site of the cathedral. The Augustinians administered the parish until the end of the 19th century.

The first church building was made of light materials. The building of “serious architecture, proven solidity and great proportions” was begun in 1779 and finally completed in 1865, on the first year of Fr. Benito Varas who administered the town until 1894.

The church was made of hewn stone and tiled roof, in accordance with the usual pattern of churches. It was a rectangular structure with artistically painted wooden panelings in lieu of an arch to which were attached support and strong beams which crisscrossed the walls to protect the building from earthquakes, attractive and had plain and simple altar ornaments without the extravagant carvings that were characteristic of the past century.

During the 19th century, keen competition among Tanauan, Lipa, Batangas, Bauan and Taal for the choice of the seat of new diocese in the Southern Tagalog Region, with Batangas Province at the center, motivated the people to build extraordinary, big churches. On April 10, 1910, the historic creation of the new diocese took place and the first bishop, Joseph Petrelli, selected Lipa as the see because of its cool climate. In later years, there were moves to transfer the see to San Pablo City but Bishop Alfredo Verzosa turned it down due to poor religious environment of San Pablo during that time.

The church suffered heavily in 1944. Alejandro Olalia repaired the façade, the dome, the transept, the roof, the main altar, and the belfry. The interior painting was retouched. Two side aisles were added. The church was awarded the title Cathedral of the archdiocese incorporating Batangas Province during the administration of Cardinal Rufino Santos.

Pedro G. Galende wrote that "the emphasis (of the edifice) is placed on the mass, which appeals much more to the senses due to its harmonic organization. The three buildings – church, convent and bell tower are so closely associated with each other that they well exemplify the typical mission complex."

At present, the 220-year old cathedral and convent is undergoing restoration and repairs. Through the efforts of the parish priest, Alfredo A. Madlangbayan, and the San Sebastian Millenium Restoration Committee, the church façade and the belfry have been repainted, the pews are newly varnished, the ceiling and the roof of the dome have been repaired, the old and leaking roof of the church and convent are replaced with long span GI sheets, and there is a new altar at the vigil room. On account of the multitude of faithful gathering at the church during liturgical activities, especially for archdiocesan affairs, the sound system was also upgraded.

=== Festivals ===
In the previous years, Lipa City had the Coffee Festival as its official city festival being coffee granary of the Philippines. The Coffee Festival was then celebrated from December 11 to 16.

Then Lipa also had the Walistik Festival celebrated on the second week of January where walis (broom) was used in costumes and props. Walis symbolizes unity and this was what the Lipeños had in mind every time they celebrate Walistik Festival.

Now, Lipa City is celebrating Lomi Festival. Lomi, being one of the most popular dishes in this side of the province, Lipa City has quite a number of lomi houses.

Traditionally, however, Lipa City is celebrating Lipa City Town Fiesta annually every January 20. This is a date to celebrate the feast of their patron saint, Saint Sebastian. During the celebration, the main road of CM Recto is flocked with market-stalls selling affordable items. Also peoples visit the Lipa City Cathedral to attend mass. Houses prepare and serve food to visitors.

== Transportation ==
=== Road networks ===
Lipa has an extensive road network. The city is a transportation hub for Batangas and nearby provinces.

==== National highways and expressways ====
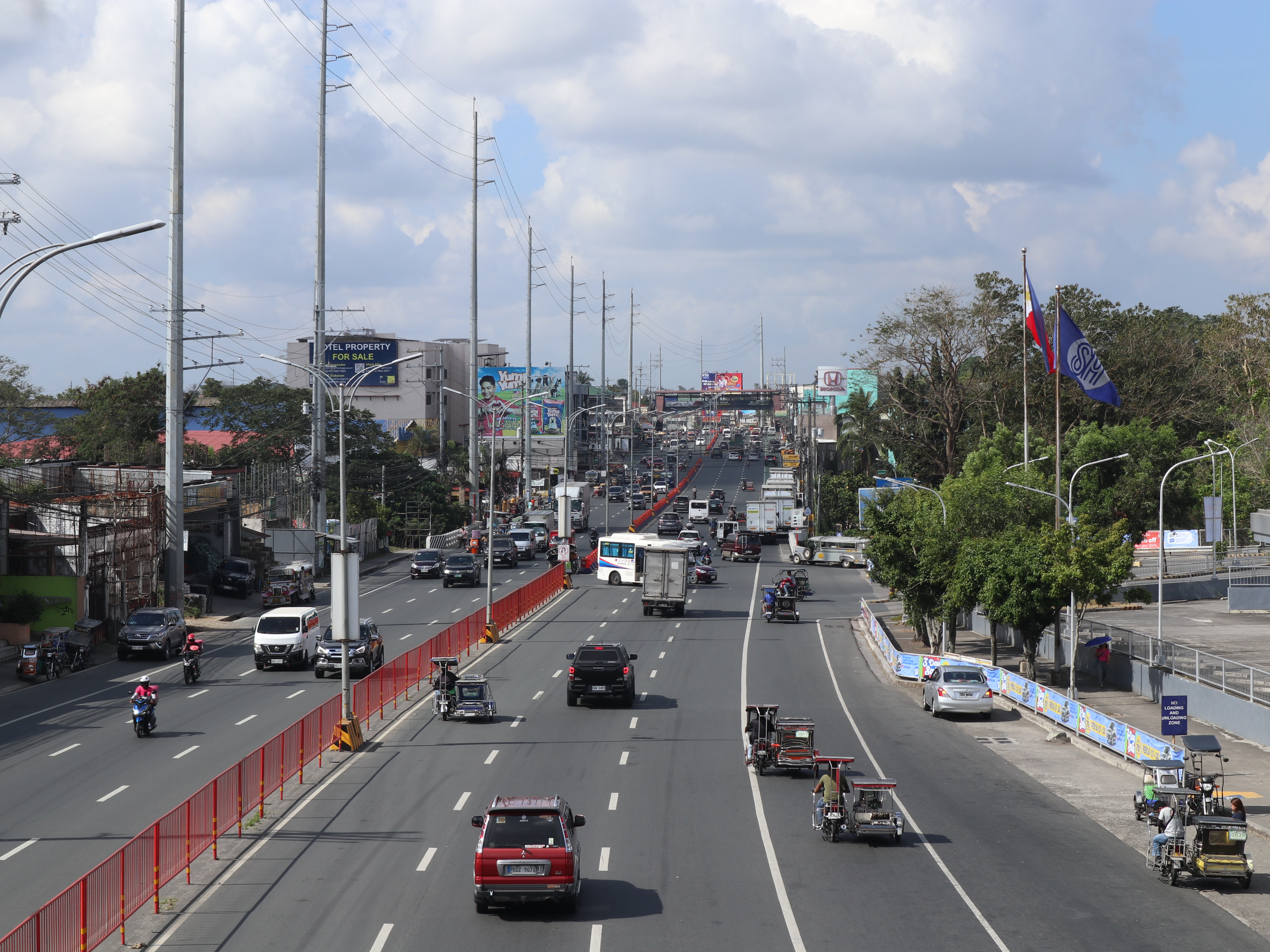
Ayala Highway

Lipa is served by a network of national highways and an expressway. The Southern Tagalog Arterial Road (STAR Tollway) connects the city with Batangas City, Tanauan and Santo Tomas, with a connection to South Luzon Expressway (SLEX), thereby linking the city with Calamba and Metro Manila. Jose P. Laurel Highway, or Ayala Highway (Route 4) on one portion, connects Lipa with the municipalities and cities of Malvar, Tanauan, and Santo Tomas in the north and San Jose and Batangas City to the south. P. Torres Street or Lipa-Padre Garcia Road (Route 431), links the city with Padre Garcia and also serves as a route to the municipalities Rosario and San Juan. Another highway, the Alaminos-Lipa City Road, serves the northern barangays of the city, runs northeast to Alaminos and serves as a route to the city with San Pablo in Laguna. Governor Feliciano P. Leviste Highway or Lipa-Balete Road links Lipa with Balete.

==== Arterial roads ====
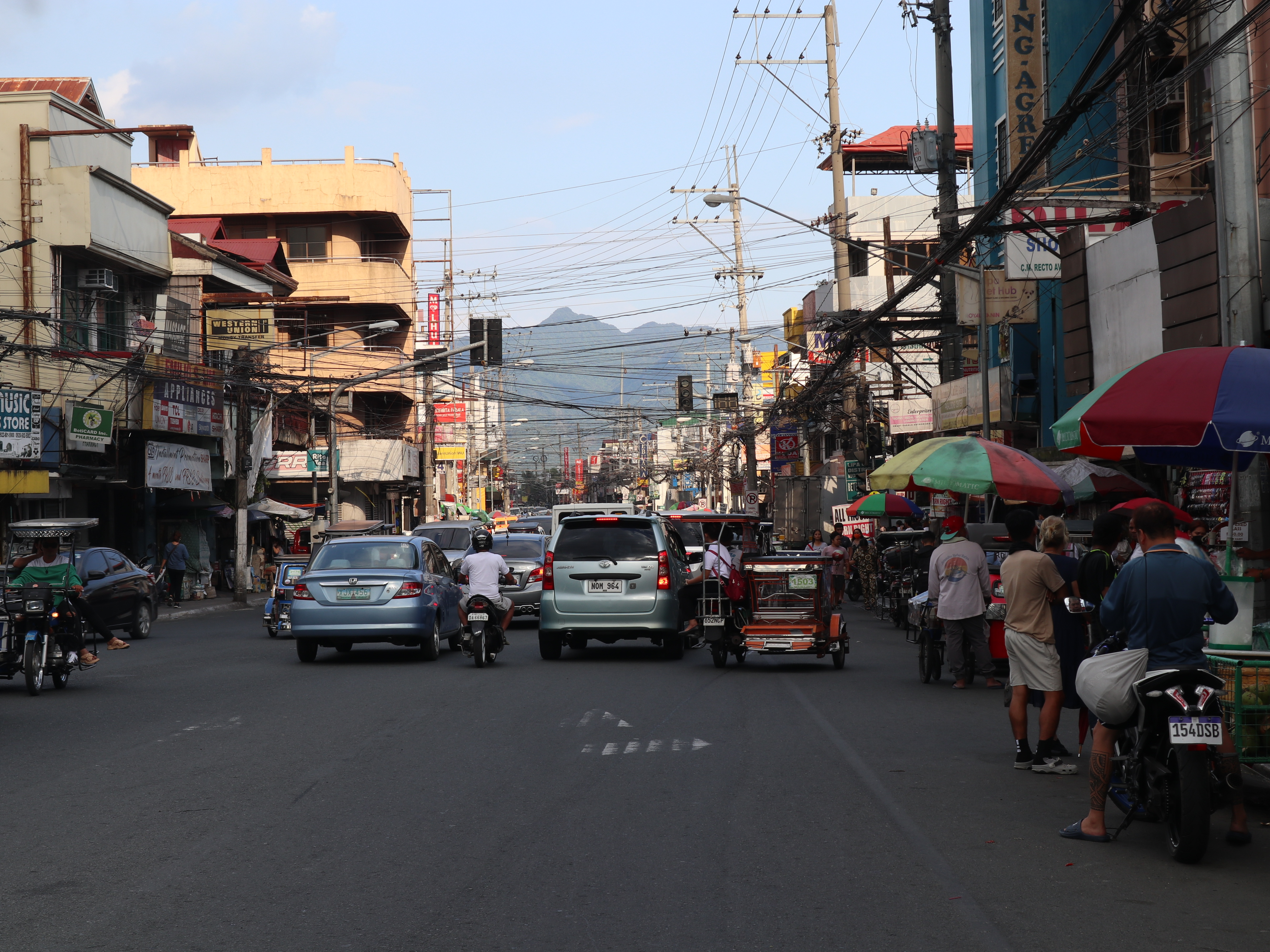
B. Morada Avenue in the poblacion

Claro M. Recto Avenue, General Luna Avenue, and B. Morada Avenue serve the city center or poblacion. On the rural areas within the city boundary, arterial roads, like Lodlod Avenue, Santo Tomas-Lipa Road and Lipa-Ibaan Road, serve the barangays and also connect with nearby municipalities, like San Jose-Batangas, Santo Tomas and Ibaan-Batangas respectively. An arterial road running beside Fernando Air Base serves the municipality of Mataasnakahoy.

=== Public transportation ===
Buses, vans, jeepneys, tricycles, and multicabs common means of transportation in the city. Large numbers of jeepneys ply their trade around the city, and are becoming the primary mode of transportation. A grand terminal built beside SM City Lipa mall now serves as the city's central transport terminal.

== Government ==
=== Local government ===
Lipa City Hall

Like other cities in the Philippines, Lipa is governed by a mayor and vice mayor who are elected to three-year terms. The mayor is the executive head who leads the city's departments in the execution of city ordinances and in the delivery of public services. The vice mayor heads a legislative council that is composed of 13 members: twelve elected councilors and one ex officio office held by the Association of Barangay Chairmen President as the barangay sector representative. The council is in charge of creating the city's policies in the form of ordinances and resolutions.

Pursuant to Chapter II, Title II, Book III of Republic Act No. 7160 or the Local Government Code of 1991, the city government is to be composed of a mayor (alkalde), a vice mayor (bise alkalde) and members (kagawad) of the legislative branch Sangguniang Panlungsod alongside a secretary to the said legislature, all of which are elected to a three-year term and are eligible to run for three consecutive terms.

As with every Philippine city, Lipa's chief executive is the city mayor. Elected to a term of three years and limited to three consecutive terms, the mayor appoints the directors of each city department, which include the office of administration, engineering office, information office, legal office, and treasury office. The incumbent mayor is Eric Africa of the Nacionalista Party.

The city's vice mayor performs duties as acting governor in the absence of the mayor. The vice mayor also automatically succeeds as mayor upon the death of the incumbent. The vice mayor also convenes the Sangguniang Panlungsod, the city's legislative body. The incumbent vice mayor of Lipa is Michael Gerard Morada.

City Government of Lipa (2025–2028):

- Representative: Ryan Christian S. Recto (Nacionalista)
- Mayor: Eric B. Africa (Nacionalista)
- Vice Mayor: Michael Gerard T. Morada (Nacionalista)
- Sangguniang Panlungsod Members:
  - Lydio A. Lopez, Jr. (Nacionalista)
  - Mark Aries P. Luancing (Nacionalista)
  - Jennifer Spye T. Toledo (Nacionalista)
  - Joel D. Pua (Nacionalista)
  - Galeleo P. Angeles (Nacionalista)
  - Merlo P. Silva (Nacionalista)
  - Venice D. Manalo (Nacionalista)
  - Ralph Michael H. Umali (Nacionalista)
  - Riofer Nicole H. Ronquillo (Nacionalista)
  - Leonilo A. Catipon (Nacionalista)
  - Miguel P. Lina III (Nacionalista)
  - Aries D. Macala (Nacionalista)
- LMB President: Windy P. Lat (San Lucas)
- SK Federation President: Angela Antonette B. Bautista (Pangao)
- Provincial Board Members:
  - Oscar M. Gozos II (Nacionalista)
  - Aries Emmanuel D. Mendoza (Nacionalista)

=== Legislative ===
Within the city, the City Board or Sangguniang Panlungsod crafts all city ordinances, performs appropriation of city funds, issues franchises and permits, impose fees on city services, and exercise other duties and powers as stipulated by the Local Government Code of 1991. Being a first-class city in terms of income, Lipa is entitled to a City Board composed of 12 members.

The city, which is solely comprised by the province's 6th congressional district, is currently represented in the Philippine House of Representatives by Ryan Recto of the Nacionalista Party.

== Education ==
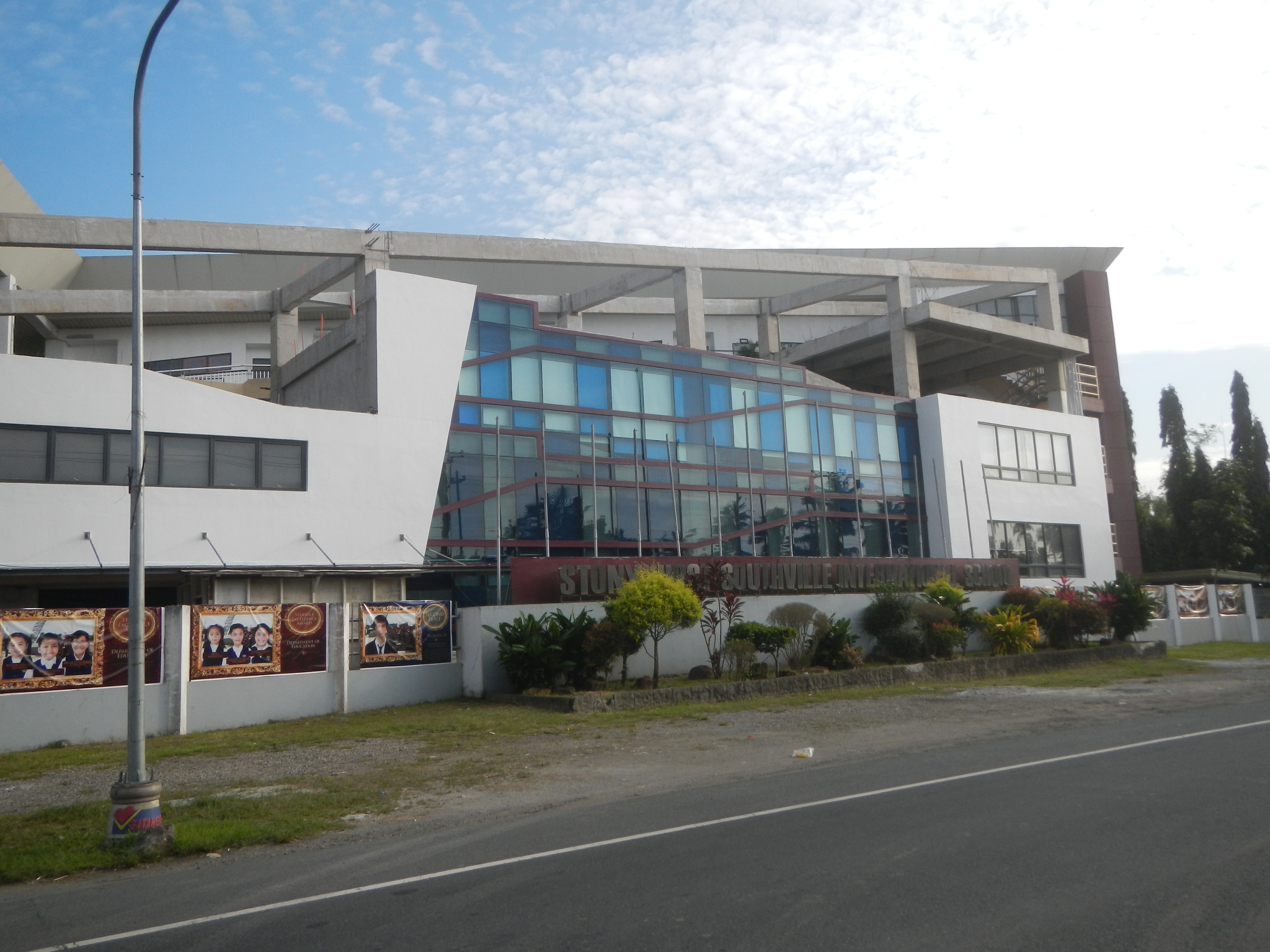
Stonyhurst Southville International School - Malarayat Campus

Lipa hosts a number of public and private universities such as the Batangas State University Claro M. Recto Campus, Kolehiyo ng Lungsod ng Lipa, The Mabini Academy, De La Salle Lipa, Lipa City Colleges, Canossa Academy Lipa, AMA Computer College, Philippine State College of Aeronautics, University of Batangas. ICT-ED Institute of Science and Technology, STI College, New Era University, and the National University also hosts a campus in the city.

=== Additional schools ===
- Pinagtongulan National High School

== Media ==
Lipa has two local radio stations, Magik 88.7 (DZUN), an adult contemporary-oriented station, and Citybeat 102.3 (DWKV), a music and talk radio station. Stations based in Batangas City and Metro Manila are mostly clearly received, except for some stations whose signals are affected by the local topography.

ABS-CBN Southern Tagalog, ABS-CBN's regional television station, hosted its studios in Lipa. GMA Network and GTV serve Lipa through relay stations at Bicol Region.

Lipa has no locally published newspapers, but major newspapers marketed in Metro Manila reach the city through local distributors.

== Notable people ==
- Ed Lingao, journalist on TV5 Manila News5
- Alex Gonzaga, actress, comedian, vlogger, entrepreneur and singer
- Mikee Morada, politician
- Ralph Recto, 33rd Secretary of Finance
- Vilma Santos, veteran actress, politician
- Ryan Recto, congressman
- Claro M. Recto, nationalist, statesman, and jurist
- Chad Kinis, actor, comedian; Youtuber
- Teodoro Kalaw, politician
- Pamu Pamorada, actress and comedian

== Sister cities ==
International

- Fremont, California, United States
- Fushun, China

Local

- Manila
