= Batangas's 6th congressional district =

House of Representatives of the Philippines legislative district

- Constituency for the House of Representatives of the Philippines
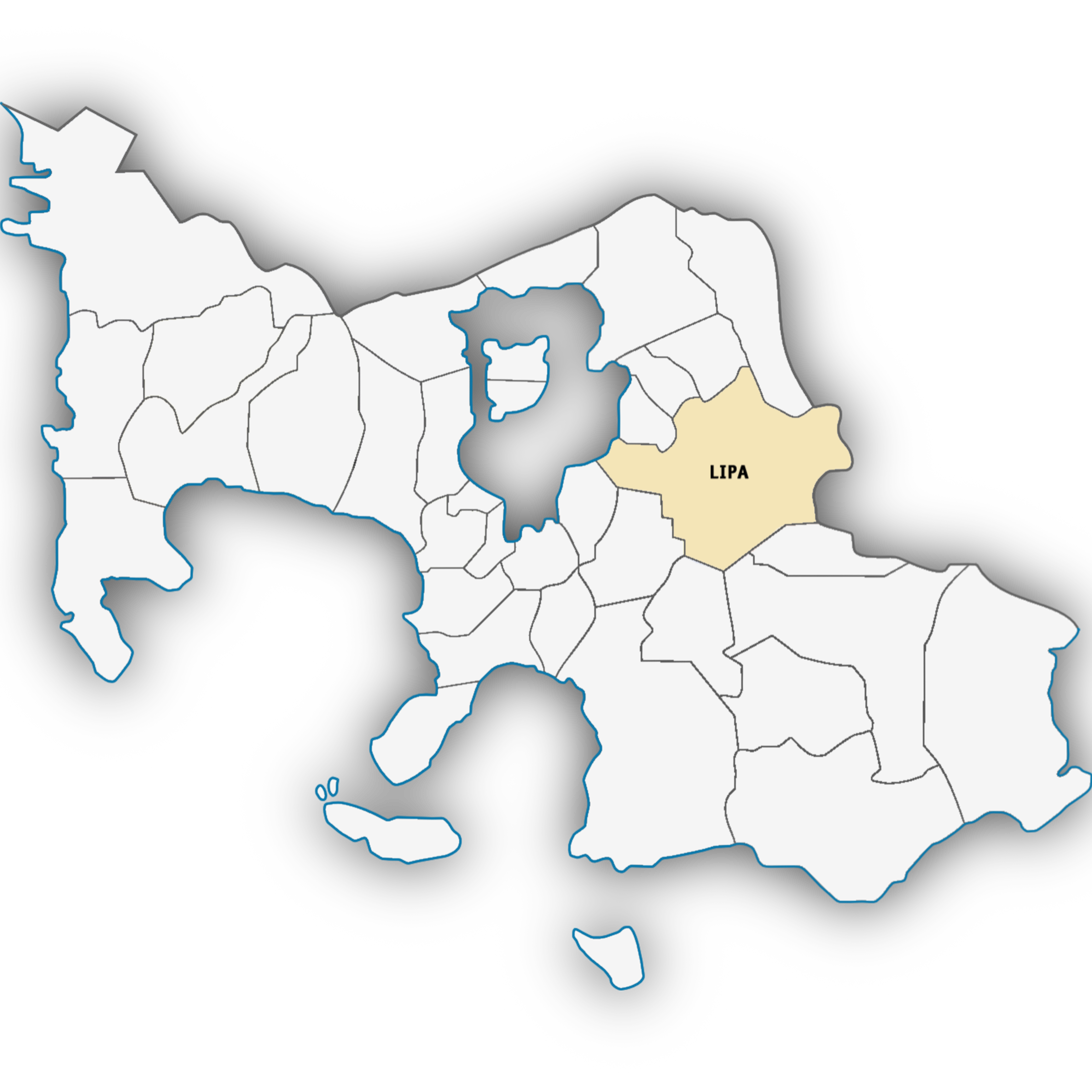
- Boundary of Batangas's 6th congressional district in Batangas

- Location of Batangas within the Philippines
- Province: Batangas
- Region: Calabarzon
- Population: 372,931 (2020)
- Electorate: 257,401 (2025)
- Major settlements: Lipa
- Area: 209.40 km^{2} (80.85 sq mi)

Current constituency
- Created: 2015
- Representative: Ryan Christian Recto
- Political party: Nacionalista
- Congressional bloc: Majority

Batangas's 6th congressional district is one of the six congressional districts of the Philippines in the province of Batangas. It has been represented in the House of Representatives of the Philippines since 2016. The district consists of Lipa. It is currently represented in the 20th Congress by Ryan Christian Recto of the Nacionalista Party (NP).

== Representation history ==
#	Image	Member	Tenure		Congress	Party	Electoral History	Constituent LGUs
#	Image	Member	Start	End	Congress	Party	Electoral History	Constituent LGUs
District created August 19, 2015 from Batangas's 4th district.
1		Vilma Santos-Recto (born 1953)	June 30, 2016	June 30, 2022	17th	Liberal	Elected in 2016.	2016–present Lipa
1		Vilma Santos-Recto (born 1953)	June 30, 2016	June 30, 2022	18th	Nacionalista	Re-elected in 2019.	2016–present Lipa
2		Ralph Recto (born 1964)	June 30, 2022	January 12, 2024	19th	Nacionalista	Elected in 2022. Resigned on appointment as Secretary of Finance.	2016–present Lipa
—		Vacant	January 12, 2024	June 30, 2025	19th	Martin Romualdez (Leyte–1st) was designated as the caretaker of the district.		2016–present Lipa
3		Ryan Recto (born 1996)	June 30, 2025	Incumbent	20th	Nacionalista	Elected in 2025.	2016–present Lipa

== Election results ==
=== 2025 ===
2025 Philippine House of Representatives election in Batangas's 6th District
Party	Candidate	Votes	%
Nacionalista	Ryan Recto	92,823	45.94%
Partido ng Masang Lipeño	Bernadette Sabili	72,976	36.11%
Independent	Mario Panganiban	20,872	10.33%
Independent	Rodel Lacorte	15,398	7.62%
Total votes		202,069	100.00%
Nacionalista hold			

=== 2022 ===
2022 Philippine House of Representatives election in Batangas's 6th District
Party	Candidate	Votes	%
Nacionalista	Ralph Recto	161,540	82.96%
Invalid or blank votes		33,172	17.04
Total votes		194,712	100.00%
Nacionalista hold			

=== 2019 ===
2019 Philippine House of Representatives election in Batangas's 6th District
Party	Candidate	Votes	%
Nacionalista	Vilma Santos-Recto (incumbent)	96,743	61.01
NPC	Meynardo Sabili	61,821	38.99
Total votes		158,564	100.00
Nacionalista hold			

=== 2016 ===
2016 Philippine House of Representatives election in Batangas's 6th District
Party	Candidate	Votes	%
Liberal	Vilma Santos-Recto	83,492	56.13%
NUP	Bernadette Sabili	60,472	40.65%
Margin of victory		23,020	15.48%
Valid ballots		143,964	96.78%
Invalid or blank votes		4,796	3.22%
Total votes		148,760	100%
Liberal win (new seat)			

== See also ==
- Legislative districts of Batangas
