= Ryan Recto =

Filipino politician (born 1996)

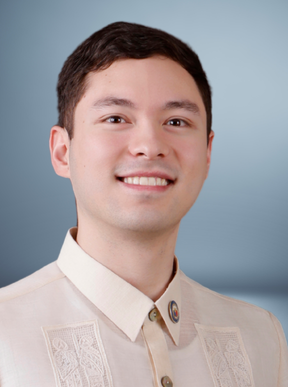
- Official portrait, 2026

Assistant Majority Leader of the House of Representatives of the Philippines
- Incumbent
- Assumed office July 29, 2025 Serving with several others
- Leader: Sandro Marcos

Member of the Philippine House of Representatives from Batangas's 6th district
- Incumbent
- Assumed office June 30, 2025
- Preceded by: Ralph Recto

Personal details
- Born: Ryan Christian Santos Recto; March 29, 1996 (age 30) Makati, Philippines
- Party: Nacionalista (2024–present)
- Parents: Ralph Recto (father); Vilma Santos (mother)
- Relatives: Luis Manzano (maternal half-brother)
- Education: Ateneo de Manila University

Ryan Christian Santos Recto (born March 29, 1996) is a Filipino politician, who has served as the Assistant House Majority Leader since July 29, 2025. He has concurrently served as the Representative of Batangas's sixth district since June 30, 2025. He is the son of actress and Batangas Governor Vilma Santos and Executive Secretary Ralph Recto.

== Early life and education ==
Ryan Recto was born on March 29, 1996, in Makati to Ralph Recto, who was then the representative for Batangas's 4th district, and actress Vilma Santos. He is the only child of the couple and Santos's second and youngest child.

During his childhood, he made a guest appearance on Goin' Bulilit. Despite this experience and though he is the son of a celebrity, he decided not to pursue an acting career. He took up a business management degree at the Ateneo de Manila University.

== Political career ==
=== House of Representatives (from 2025) ===
Recto was elected as the representative for Batangas's sixth district in 2025 under the Nacionalista Party. He ran under the ticket of his mother, who successfully ran for governor with his half-brother and TV host, Luis Manzano, as her running mate. He succeeded his father, who vacated the seat in January 2024, to become the secretary of finance.

On July 29, 2025, Recto was named as an assistant majority leader under Ilocos Norte's 1st district representative Sandro Marcos.

In May 2026, during a privilege speech in congress, Recto pushed back against Batangas's 1st districy Representative Leandro Leviste’s allegations of campaign funding irregularities and profiteering from public works against his father, Executive Secretary Ralph Recto.

Recto serves as the vice chairperson for both the Economic Affairs Committee and the Globalization and WTO Committee in the House of Representatives.

== Electoral history ==
Electoral history of Ryan Recto
| Year | Office | Party | Votes received | | | | Result |
| Year | Office | Party | Total | % | P. | Swing | Result |
|---|---|---|---|---|---|---|---|
| 2025 | Representative (Batangas–6th) | Nacionalista | 92,823 | 45.94% | 1st | —N/a | Won |
