= Muhammad al-Mukhtar al-Shinqiti =

Mauritanian scholar

Dr. Muhammad al-Mukhtar al-Shinqiti
- محمد المختار الشنقيطي
- Born: 1966 (age 59–60); Nouakchott, Mauritania
- Education: Bachelor of Islamic Jurisprudence; Bachelor of Translation Studies (Arabic, French, English); Master of Business Administration, Columbia Southern University; PhD in History of Religions, Texas Tech University
- Occupation: Associate professor
- Spouse: Oumoul Sidahmed
- Children: 6

Muhammad al-Mukhtar al-Shinqiti (Arabic: محمد المختار الشنقيطي; born 1966) is a Mauritanian political activist, author, and academic. He currently works at Hamad Bin Khalifa University as an associate professor of political ethics and history of religion. In addition, he writes Arabic articles in Al Jazeera, which, as of February 2020, had exceeded 400 articles.

Al-Shinqiti has acquired degrees in different fields of both religious sciences and social sciences. These include fiqh, translation studies, business administration, and the history of religion. He is a strong critic of Arab regimes and writes extensively about the Arab Spring, the Muslim world, and Islamic modernism.

== Biography ==
Bearing one of the most common trinomials given names in Mauritania, al-Shinqiti was born in Nouakchott to a businessman and scholar. He memorized the Qur'an at the age of 11 and expanded his scholarship of religion by taking extra schooling years during high school. He then took an undergraduate double major in both religious sciences and translation studies.

Along with translation in journalism, he first worked as a secondary school teacher. Then, due to his perceived conservative background, he was assigned a tutoring position in a salafi university in Yemen. He resigned two years later, stating that his views conflicted with their mainstream ideology, like, for example, denying the religious retribution of Ridda.

During his scholarship in Texas, he volunteered to serve as an imam in the Islamic Center of South Plains in Lubbock.

== Political views ==
Shinqiti is a strong proponent of Islamism and considers himself "a brother of the Muslim Brotherhood". He emphasizes a compatibility between Shari'a and political freedom, claiming that any purported conflict between the two is a result of an unclear theory of religion. Also, he thinks the Islamic world suffers from a schism between Islamic and secular factions, which necessitates the emphasis on such compatibility.

He has spoken against the Iranian-funded proxy conflict in the Middle East, which he says was facilitated by the United States.

In 2008, responding to Yahya Jammeh's announcement of his intention to execute all homosexuals, al-Shinqiti issued a fatwa about LGBT people and Islam in which he denied a scriptural ground for punishment of homosexuals. However, he assured that it is strongly condemned and is considered by Islam to be immoral and "anti-life".

Al-Shinqiti also expressed wide support for Turkish involvement in the Syrian Civil War. According to him, it is a sign of an Islamic awakening in which "Arabs and Turks fight against the oppressive regimes".

== Personal life ==
Al-Shinqiti has six children and lives in Doha, Qatar. His youngest daughter, Iman, is an American citizen by birth.

== Bibliography ==
=== Arabic ===
- — (2013), الخلافات السياسية بين الصحابة [The Political Disputes Between Companions of the Prophet], Beirut: Arab Network for Research and Publishing, ISBN 9786144310151
- — (2016), أثر الحروب الصليبية على العلاقات السنية الشيعية [The Crusaders' Impact on Suni-Shi'a Relations], Beirut: Arab Network for Research and Publishing, ISBN 9786144311196

=== Turkish ===
- — (2005), Sahabe Arasindaki Siyasi Ihtilaflar [The Political Disputes Between Companions of the Prophet], Istanbul: Cira Yayinlar, ISBN 9789756353257
- — (2012), Hacli Savaslarinin Etkisi Altinda Sunni-Sii Iliskileri [The Crusaders' Impact on Suni-Shi'a Relations], Istanbul: İlimyurdu Yayıncılık, ISBN 9786055793692
