= Mohamed El Moctar =

Malian politician

Mohamed El Moctar is a Malian politician. He serves as the Malian Minister of National Reconciliation.
