= Michael Milli Husein =

Dr. Michael Milli Husein is a South Sudanese politician. He was born in 1951 Raga, Western Bahr el Ghazal, South Sudan. He is a graduate of Faculty of Medicine, University of Alexandria (Egypt). After graduation, he worked as a civil servant for 15 years. In 1995, he was appointed as State Minister of Health, and then in 2001 he was appointed as the Governor of the Western Bahr el Ghazal. He has been Minister for General Education in the Cabinet of South Sudan. He was appointed to that position on 10 July 2011.

== Diplomacy ==
In November 2014, President Salva Kiir Mayardit appointed him as the ambassador to China. In July 2022, President Salva Kiir Mayardit appointed him as the Ambassador to France.

== See also ==
- SPLM
- SPLA
- Cabinet of South Sudan
