= Timeline of the People Power Revolution =

People Power Revolution
- Date: February 22–25, 1986
- Location: Quezon City, Philippines
- Also known as: EDSA Revolution; EDSA I Yellow Revolution
- Participants: President Ferdinand Marcos; Armed Forces of the Philippines loyalists under Fabian Ver; Anti-Marcos forces: Armed Forces of the Philippines rebels under Fidel V. Ramos; Defense Minister Juan Ponce Enrile; Protesters led by Cardinal Jaime Sin
- Outcome: Fall of Marcos regime (1965–86); start of Fifth Republic

The People Power Revolution (also known as the EDSA Revolution and the Philippine Revolution of 1986) was a series of popular demonstrations in the Philippines that began in 1983 and culminated in 1986. This campaign of civil resistance protested against regime violence and electoral fraud, and led to the toppling of dictator Ferdinand Marcos and the restoration of the country's democracy.

== Timeline ==
=== 1983 ===
- August 21 (1 pm) – Senator Benigno S. "Ninoy" Aquino Jr. is assassinated at Manila International Airport in Pasay and Parañaque, Metro Manila.
- September 21 – As the government celebrates Barangay Day/National Thanksgiving Day to commemorate the declaration of martial law, thousands of Aquino's supporters hold a "National Day of Sorrow" and call for unity in the ranks to topple the Marcos dictatorship.
- September 25 - The Justice for Aquino, Justice for All or JAJA Coalition is created by Sen. Jose W. Diokno through his group Kilusan sa Kapangyarihan at Karapatan ng Bayan (Movement for People's Sovereignty and Democracy) or KAAKBAY, which introduced pressure politics in the Philippines.

=== 1984 ===
- May 14 – Elections for the Batasang Pambansa (parliament) are held. The United Nationalist Democratic Organization (UNIDO) and the Partido Demokratiko Pilipino-Lakas ng Bayan (PDP-LABAN) coalition decide to take part. Aquino's widow, Corazón, throws her support behind the opposition candidates, who surprise Marcos by winning 56 seats out of the 183 amidst allegations of fraud.
- October 24 – The Agrava Board, a fact-finding commission tasked with investigating the Aquino assassination, concludes that there was a military conspiracy behind the killing and implicates Armed Forces Chief of Staff, Gen. Fabián Ver.

=== 1985 ===
- February 22 – General Ver, 24 soldiers, and one civilian stand trial before the Sandiganbayan for the Aquino murder. Ver takes a leave of absence as Armed Forces Chief of Staff.
- August 13 – Opposition MPs file a motion for impeachment against Marcos in the Batasan, citing culpable violation of the Constitution and "hidden wealth." The majority party quashes the motion.
- November 3 – Marcos suddenly announces the holding of snap elections after alleged prodding from the United States.
- December 2 – General Ver and all his co-accused are acquitted by the Sandiganbayan. Marcos reinstates him as Chief of Staff amid widespread protest.
- December 3 – Corazon Aquino declares her candidacy for president. Salvador Laurel, who earlier wanted to run for the same position, agrees to be her running mate.
- December 5 – The Opposition makes a formal announcement of the Aquino-Laurel tandem ticket for the snap elections. Religious movement Iglesia ni Cristo endorses Marcos for the presidency.

=== 1986 ===
==== February 7 ====
- Attempts of fraud, vote-buying, intimidation, and violence are reported and election returns are tampered with. The Commission on Elections (COMELEC) tally board shows Marcos leading while the National Citizen's Movement for the Free Elections (NAMFREL) consistently shows Corazon Aquino ahead by a comfortable margin.

==== February 9 ====
- 35 computer workers at the COMELEC tabulation centre in the Philippine International Convention Center walk out and seek refuge at the Baclaran Church in Parañaque, protesting the Marcos administration tampering with election results.

==== February 11 ====
- Opposition ex-Governor Evelio Javier of Antique is murdered in front of the provincial capitol where canvassing is being held. The primary suspects are bodyguards of the local KBL leader.

==== February 13 ====
- The Catholic Bishops' Conference of the Philippines (CBCP) issues a statement condemning the elections as fraudulent.

==== February 15 ====
- The Batasang Pambansa declares President Ferdinand Marcos and his running mate Arturo Tolentino as the winners of the February 7 elections.

==== February 16 ====
- Around 2 million people gather at the Quirino Grandstand in Luneta Park, Manila to protest the proclamation of Marcos and Tolentino as winners of the February 7 elections. Opposition leader and UNIDO presidential candidate Corazon Aquino calls for nationwide civil disobedience and a boycott of all Marcos crony-owned companies to protest the proclamation.

==== February 22 ====
- 12:00 AM: Defense Minister Juan Ponce Enrile and key aides finalize Enrile's speech in which he will proclaim himself head of a ruling junta after rebel troops led by the Reform the Armed Forces Movement (RAM) assault on Malacañang Palace in Manila. The assault is planned for February 23 at 2:00 AM.
- 2:00 AM:
  - The final meeting of the RAM at Enrile's house in Dasmariñas Village in Makati before the assault on Malacañang.
  - AFP Chief of Staff Fabian Ver calls in additional units to defend Malacañang.
- 3:00 AM: The final meeting at the Defense Minister's home is concluded. Lt. Col. Gringo Honasan and Linda Kapunan begin their recoinnaisance of Malacañang. To their dismay, they discover battle-hardened Marines stationed at their main point of attack.
- 6:30 AM: Maj. Avelino Razon briefs AFP Vice Chief of Staff Gen. Fidel V. Ramos on the developments of RAM's plans.
- 9:00 AM: Fabian Ver sends Col. Rolando Abadilla to Col. Honasan to inform the latter that their plans have been made known already and that RAM should not make any rash decisions.
- 10:00 AM:
  - Lt. Col. Honasan phones Kapunan and informs him that they are not going to abort the mission, but to simply "freeze" the operation for the next 24 hours.
  - Honasan reviews the situation and assesses the prepositioning of the troops from his office in GHQAFP Camp Aguinaldo.
  - Corazon Aquino leaves for Cebu City, the second most populous city in the country, to meet with her running mate Salvador Laurel and sell her seven-point program of nonviolent protest including civil disobedience, which is just a week old, as well as to thank the Cebuanos for the 70,000 margin of victory given her “despite the goons of Marcos allies.”
- 12:00 PM:
  - Philippine Navy Capt. Rex Robles is assigned to act as a liaison with the diplomatic community in case the RAM officers are arrested, and tell the world of their story.
  - U.S. Ambassador to the Philippines Stephen Bosworth along with Philip Habib, U.S. President Ronald Reagan's personal envoy to Marcos, visit the Palace for a meeting with the President. They discuss the recent elections and the political situation. The U.S. envoys call on Marcos to retire Ver.
- 12:45 PM: While Marcos' meeting with the U.S. envoys continues, Capt. Ricardo Morales, one of Imelda Marcos' close-in security team who is a mole of RAM in the PSG (Presidential Security Guard), reconnoiters the defenses of the Palace grounds, and takes the initiative to withdraw some firearms from the PSG armory. He is arrested and brought to the office of the Aide-de-camp for interrogation. The other moles are Maj. Saulito Aromin, Lt. Col. Jake Malajacan and Maj. Ricardo Brillantes.
- 1:45 PM:
  - As the meeting comes to a close, Gen. Ver storms into the Presidential study to convey the news of the recent arrest of four officers in the PSG who are found to be members of RAM.
  - Philip Habib states as he leaves Malacañang, that: "Cory won the election and deserves our support. Marcos is finished, and we ought to offer him asylum in the United States."
- 2:00 PM: With their plans discovered, Enrile and the RAM officers are forced to change their direction. They decide that they need to draw on public support to ensure their prospects during the crisis.
- 2:15 PM: Corazon Aquino, at the rally in Cebu, calls for the boycott of Marcos crony-owned business.
- 3:00 PM: Honasan gives the signal to prepare his men for combat. He, Enrile and Kapunan fly to Aguinaldo in a chopper.
- 3:30 PM: At Camp Aguinaldo, Enrile's guards bring out brand-new M16 rifles, Uzis and Galils. Enrile orders troop deployments around Camp Crame.
- 3:45 PM: Enrile contacts to Archbishop of Manila Cardinal Jaime Sin and seeks his moral and active support, as the former feels that he will not survive the day.
- 4:30 PM: The first military command to defect to the rebel side is Regional Unified Command No. 8, which includes troops in First Lady Imelda Marcos's own province, Leyte. No. 8 is led by Brig. Gen. Salvador Mison who is in Camp Aguinaldo.
- 5:00 PM: Unaware of unfolding events, Ver and Imelda attend the wedding of a general's son at Villamor Air Base. Ver is stunned when told of the defection. Enrile tells Sin: “I will be dead within one hour. I don’t want to die … If it is possible, do something. I’d still like to live.”
- 5:00-5:30 PM: Pres. Marcos' first response to the mutiny is to call his family to Malacañang.
- 6:00 PM: Gen. Ramos arrives at Camp Aguinaldo after a dialogue in his Alabang house with a group called the Cory Crusaders.
- 6:30 PM: Malacañang receives a "report" that Ramos and Enrile are "officially withdrawing their support" of the Marcos administration.
- 6:45 PM:
  - Enrile and Ramos, surrounded by their staff and guards, hold a press conference at the Social Hall of the GHQAFP, and make the official announcement of their withdrawal of support of the Marcos administration.
  - Enrile states in his opening that "We are going to die here fighting."
  - Ramos states "There has become an elite Armed Forces of the Philippines that no longer represents the rank and officers' corps of the Armed Forces. ...The President of 1986 is not the President to whom we dedicated our service. it is clear that he no longer is the able and capable commander-in-chief that we count upon. ... He has put his personal family interest above the interest of the people. We do not consider President Marcos as now being a duly constituted authority."
  - Enrile adds: "I cannot in my conscience recognize the President as the commander-in-chief of the Armed Forces and I am appealing to the other members of the Cabinet to heed the will of the people expressed during the last elections. Because in my own region, I know that we cheated in the elections to the extent of 350,000 votes. ... No, I will not serve under Mrs. Aquino even if she is installed as a president. ... Our loyalty is to the Constitution and the country. ... You are welcome to join us. We have no food..."
  - Ramos closes, "I am not even acting Chief of Staff of the Armed Forces. I think that when he made that announcement to you and to the whole world last Sunday, he was just fooling us, and he was fooling the entire world because he flip-flopped so many times already. ... I would like to appeal to the fair and to the dedicated and people-oriented members of the AFP and the INP to join us in this crusade for better government."
- 7:00 PM:
  - Corazon Aquino receives the news of the withdrawal of support by Enrile and Ramos. She calls allies in Manila to verify the report.
  - Marcos remains in the Palace study room with Fabian and Irwin Ver, and Information Minister Gregorio Cendaña.
- 8:15 PM:
  - Gen. Ver orders Brig. Gen. Fidel Singson, Chief of the Intelligence Service of the Armed Forces of the Philippines (ISAFP), to "Destroy Radio Veritas!"
  - Unbeknown to Ver, Singson is already in the process of defecting to the rebel group. Singson sends his men to Radio Veritas, not to destroy, but only to reconnoiter the area.
- 8:30 PM: Cardinal Jaime Sin goes on air and calls on the people to "Please, do not be alarmed, stay home."
- 8:45 PM: The rebel group is taken aback by the Cardinal's announcement and calls him to clarify their request. They ask him to send the people to the AFP camps.
- 9:00 PM:
  - Cardinal Sin goes on air once more and says "Leave your homes now...I ask you to support Mr. Enrile and Gen. Ramos, give them food if you like, they are our friends."
  - Philippine Daily Inquirer co-chairman Betty Go-Belmonte telephones Member of Parliament Cecilia Muñoz-Palma. Muñoz-Palma immediately makes a call to Radio Veritas and is one of the first opposition leaders to express support for the revolution.
  - Enrile ends a phone conversation with Ver, with both adversaries agreeing not to attack tonight. It is a revolution that started with a ceasefire.
- 9:30 PM:
  - Butz Aquino and the August Twenty-One Movement (ATOM) Executive Committee deliberate on whether to support Enrile and Ramos. The Executive Committee wants to wait on Cory Aquino for instructions. Aquino finally decides to head to Camp Aguinaldo to support the rebels.
  - Cory Aquino meanwhile is also deciding on what actions to take after receiving the call from ATOM. She requests to speak with Enrile first.
  - Col. Antonio Sotelo, Commander of the 15th Strike Wing, receives a call at his Villamor Air Base office from Col. Hector Tarrazona, who is also a member of RAM, asking the Commander whether he is with them. Col. Sotelo confirms that he supports RAM, and orders his Squadron Commanders to arm their attack helicopters.
- 10:00 PM:
  - Radio Veritas continues with the blow-by-blow account of the rebellion.
  - Enrile and Aquino, who is secured in the Carmelite convent in Cebu City, have a brief phone conversation. (Aquino had known of Enrile's coup plans.)
  - In Malacañang, Imelda tells reporters of a plot to kill her and Marcos at 12:30 AM.
- 10:20 PM: The August Twenty-One Movement's Butz Aquino, the younger brother of Ninoy Aquino, despite his group's decision to wait, throws his support behind the rebels and calls on volunteers to meet him at Isetann department store in Cubao, Quezon City to prepare for a march to EDSA in support of the so-called breakaway Marcos military.
- 10:30 PM:
  - Marcos announces over government-owned Channel 4 that he is in total control of the situation and calls on Enrile and Ramos “to stop this stupidity and surrender so that we may negotiate.” He reports the thwarting of an attempt on his life by one of Imelda's bodyguards in a conspiracy involving Enrile and Ramos and then proceeds to present the alleged assassin, Morales, who reads a supposed confession.
  - Nuns and seminarians of Bandila, a moderate coalition, are the first to form a human barricade around Camp Crame.
  - Superstar Nora Aunor arrives at EDSA.
  - Food starts arriving in response to Enrile's appeal that while they are ready to die for their country, they have no food for the troops.
- 11:00 PM:
  - Enrile tells Marcos over Radio Veritas: “Enough is enough, Mr. President. Your time is up. Do not miscalculate our strength now.”
  - Kris Aquino, then disco-hopping 15-year-old youngest daughter of Cory Aquino, is found after a frantic search and reunited with her mother; both are taken to the Carmelite convent in Cebu.
- 11:15 PM:
  - Ver orders power and water lines at Camps Aguinaldo and Crame to be cut, but he is ignored.
  - The crowd at EDSA swells.
  - Officials who withdraw support for Marcos now include Lt. Col. Jerry Albano and his security and escort battalion of 200 officers and men.

==== February 23 ====
- 12:00 AM: The number of people begins to grow by the thousands around the two camps along EDSA, in response to the radio address by Cardinal Sin on Radio Veritas.
- 1:00 AM: Marcos presents alleged assassin Maj. Saulito Aromin on Channel 4.
- 1:45 AM: Supreme Court Justice Nestor Alampay resigns.
- 3:00 AM:
  - AFP Chief Gen. Fabian Ver gathers his men in the Philippine Army headquarters of Fort Bonifacio and appoints Maj. Gen. Josephus Ramas, his protégé, to lead the assault on Camps Aguinaldo and Crame. Enrile urges Corazon Aquino to announce her government, with her as duly elected president.
  - Sin goes on the air on Radio Veritas to ask Marcos and Ver not to use force.
- 4:00 AM (12:00 PM Eastern Time Zone): In Washington, U.S. Secretary of State George Shultz assembles a small group, including former Ambassador to the Philippines Michael Armacost, to lay down a firm policy on the Philippines.
- 5:30 AM:
  - Marcos loyalist troops destroy Radio Veritas’ transmitter in Bulacan province, limiting its reach to Luzon.
  - Philippine Marine Corps commander Gen. Artemio Tadiar is stunned to learn that Ramas, who has little combat experience, has been assigned to lead the attack on rebels. Tadiar and his men are standing guard in Malacañang.
  - Corazon Aquino, still in Cebu City, turns down Assemblyman Ramon Mitra Jr.'s offer to bring her to Palawan province, and decides to return to Manila.
  - Mass is celebrated inside Camp Crame.
  - Outside, at EDSA, people continue to arrive, some on foot. Human barricades are further fortified.
- 6:00 AM: ATOM leadership and members proceed to EDSA and the military camps after a brief meeting in Cubao district.
- 7:30 AM: Radio Veritas restarts broadcasts from a backup transmitter as government forces damage the main one in Barangay Dakila, Malolos, Bulacan, and plans are made to move operations in Manila.
- 8:00 AM:
  - After waiting for three hours for permission to withdraw his troops from Palace, Tadiar shouts at Ramas: “This is insane! I am still waiting for permission to move troops, yet you are ready to move out!”
  - Marcos orders Col. Antonio Sotelo, commander of the Philippine Air Force's 15th Strike Wing based in Naval Station Sangley Point, to disable the helicopters in Camp Crame. With no one volunteering to carry out the attack, Sotelo discusses with his men a plan to fight alongside the Enrile-Ramos troops.
- 10:00 AM: Soldiers from the Philippine Army and the Philippine Marine Corps from Fort Bonifacio and other camps begin to be deployed in opposition to the rebel forces. Mounted on M35 carrier trucks, LVT-5s, M113s and AIFVs and V150s, they are, that very afternoon, stopped by the massive crowd, with nuns and clergy at the front.
- 11:00 AM: Cory Aquino holds a brief press conference in Cebu, asking the people to support the military rebels and calling on Marcos to step down.
- 12:00 PM:
  - Marcos men present at the presidential table include Presidential Executive Assistant Juan C. Tuvera, Agrarian Reform Minister Conrado Estrella, Public Works Minister Jesus Hipolito, Food Administrator Jesus Tanchangco, Agriculture Minister Salvador Escudero III, Education Minister Jaime C. Laya, Member of Parliament Teodulo Natividad, Budget Minister Manuel Alba, MP Salvador Britanico, former Acting Foreign Minister Pacifico Castro, MIA Manager Luis Tabuena, Isabela Gov. Faustino Dy, Information Minister Gregorio Cendaña, Justice Minister Estelito Mendoza, Justice Buenaventura Guerrero, Assistant Press Secretary Amante Bigornia, MP Antonio Raquiza, Economic Planning Minister Vicente Valdepeñas Jr. and former Sen. Rodolfo Ganzon. Standing behind them are military men, including General Ver, Rear Adm. Brillante Ochoco, Felix Brawner Jr., Carlos Martel, Juanito Veridiano, Hamilton Dimaya, Eustaquio Purugganan, Telesforo Tayko, Serapio Martillano, Pompeyo Vasquez, Victorino Azada, Arsenio Silva, Evaristo Sanches, Emerson Tangan and Philippine Navy Capt. Danilo Lazo.
  - President Marcos joins his men at the table and then appears again on television and presents two more arrested military officers, Lt. Col. Jake Malajacan and Maj. Ricardo Brillantes, who both read statements.
  - Marcos says other officers have been arrested and are being interrogated. He scoffs at Enrile and Ramos’ demand that he resign.
  - He brushes aside claims that 300,000 to 400,000 people are gathered at EDSA, some carrying images of the Virgin Mary.
- 1:30 PM: Police forces led by Metropolitan Police Chief Alfredo Lim ignore orders to disperse the crowd assembled.
- 2:20 PM:
  - Cory Aquino arrives in Manila and proceeds to meet her sister Josephine C. Reyes at her house near Wack Wack Golf and Country Club, Mandaluyong.
  - Enrile and Ramos decide to consolidate their forces at Camp Crame.
  - Linking arms, the people at EDSA create a protective wall for Enrile and RAM troops as they leave Camp Aguinaldo and cross the highway to get to Crame on the other side.
- 2:47 PM: A car with tinted windows carrying Cory Aquino cruises alongside a Marcos loyalist column of seven tanks and two Marine battalions led by Tadiar moving on EDSA.
- 3:00 PM: A PMC armored contingent halts in full view of the crowd along Ortigas Avenue in the Ortigas CBD, Pasig. They would later pull back. Radio Veritas had earlier learned of their planned attack on the camps.
- 4:00 PM: Marcos calls Enrile and offers him an absolute pardon. He rejects Enrile's demand that the tanks be stopped.
- 6:30 PM: Radio Veritas signs off after the emergency transmitter bogs down. In a news conference, Enrile announces his men's rejection of Marcos’ offer of pardon. Ramos talks about a "New Armed Forces".
- 7:00 PM:
  - Papal Nuncio Bruno Torpigliani hands Marcos a letter from Pope John Paul II asking for a peaceful resolution of the crisis.
  - The White House in Washington issues a statement questioning "credibility and legitimacy" of the Marcos government.
- 9:00 PM: General Ramos makes a speech to the crowd: "What is happening here is not a Coup d'etat, but a revolution of the people!"
- 11:30 PM: As Radio Veritas signs off, due to difficulties with electricity, June Keithley and station staff take over the DZRJ radio headquarters in Santa Mesa, Manila, along Ramon Magsaysay Boulevard, planning to restart transmissions at midnight.

==== February 24 ====
- 12:00 AM: Radio Veritas broadcasts from its new, secret location as "Radyo Bandido" (Outlaw radio) from the DZRJ station building.
- 1:00 AM:
  - Church bells ring and word spreads that President Marcos is planning an attack.
  - People again converge on EDSA; tires are set ablaze and sandbags and rocks are piled up to block the roads to Camp Crame.
- 3:00 AM: Armed Forces Chief of Staff Gen. Fabian Ver is still unable to locate DZRJ, which is very near Malacañang.
- 3:30 AM:
  - At Camp Crame, Defense Minister Juan Ponce Enrile warns of two oncoming armored personnel carriers (APCs).
  - Human barricades led by nuns and priests prepare to block the path of the APCs.
- 4:00 AM:
  - In Washington, U.S. President Ronald Reagan refuses to personally tell Marcos to step down but agrees to give him asylum.
  - U.S. Secretary of State George Shultz calls Ambassador Stephen Bosworth in Manila with instructions to tell Marcos “his time is up.”
- 5:00 AM:
  - Marcos rejects the U.S.'s new stance. Speaking on radio, he vows: “We’ll wipe them out. It is obvious they are committing rebellion.” Ver and the Army commander, Maj. Gen. Josephus Ramas, give the go-ahead signal for an all-out attack on EDSA using tear gas, gunships, fighter aircraft and Marine artillery.
  - At Camp Crame, AFP Vice Chief of Staff Lt. Gen. Fidel Ramos calls for civilian reinforcements amid reports that a large loyalist military force is being assembled.
  - Rebel soldiers tearfully prepare for battle and ask for absolution. They sing the Philippine Military Academy hymn and bid one another farewell.
- 5:15 AM: First tear gas attack on the people by personnel of the Philippine Marines along Santolan Road.
- 6:00 AM:
  - Tension rises as helicopters approach Camp Crame. Seven Sikorskys armed with rockets and cannons land inside the camp. These are the helicopters coming from the 15th Strike Wing and these, together with several of their helicopter crews defect to the people and the Enrile-Ramos camp upon landing in the grounds of the camp, much to their delight. It would later turn out that Col. Antonio Sotero is a RAM supporter.
  - Balbas trains awesome firepower on Camp Crame after hearing an exaggerated account of rebel strength from Rodolfo Estrellado of military intelligence. Unknown to Balbas, Estrellado defected to the Enrile-Ramos forces.
  - Aboard a gunboat, Commodore Tagumpay Jardiniano announces to his 50 officers that he is supporting the Ramos-Enrile forces. Officers rejoice after minutes of silence.
  - The frigate soon drops anchor in the Pasig River with guns trained on Malacañang.
- 6:30 AM: Keithley announces that Ver and Marcos and his family have fled the country.
- 7:30 AM:
  - Triumphant, Enrile and Ramos address an ecstatic crowd outside Camp Crame.
  - Ramos does his famous jump on the PC-INP headquarters in Camp Crame, in full view of the people and the media.
  - Two fighter planes with orders to bomb the camp tilt their wings and head toward Clark Air Base in Pampanga province.
- 9:00 AM:
  - To show that they have not fled, Marcos, his family and his generals appear on television.
  - He announces the lifting of his “maximum tolerance” policy and declares a nationwide state of emergency.
  - Ramas issues a “kill” order to Balbas. In his reply, Balbas says he and his men are looking for maps.
- 9:20 AM: Ramas again orders Balbas to fire. Balbas answers: “Sir, I am still positioning the cannons.”
- 9:50 AM: As President Marcos makes another TV appearance, MBS Channel 4 is suddenly taken over by reformist soldiers of the AFP and then signs off as its studios and facilities at the ABS-CBN Broadcasting Center are captured.
- 10:15 AM: Rebel soldiers inflict slight damage on Malacañang to indicate their capacity to strike back.
- 12:00 PM: Three rebel gunships destroy choppers at Villamor Air Base.
- 12:30 PM: Marines led by Balbas withdraw from Camp Aguinaldo.
- 1:25 PM: Channel 4 restarts transmissions under the interim name The New TV-4 (until it is officially rebranded as the People's Television Network in April of the same year) with ex-ABS-CBN Corporation technicians supervising. Within minutes Radio Veritas moves into the complex, restarting transmissions.
- 3:00 PM: With more and more people converging on EDSA and surrounding areas, Singaporean Ambassador Peter Sung offers to fly the Marcoses to his country. Marcos refuses.
- 4:30 PM:
  - Ver and Ramas decide to launch a final “suicide assault.”
  - Cory Aquino shows up on a makeshift stage in front of the Philippine Overseas Employment Agency office on EDSA and Ortigas Avenue and delivers a brief exhortation to the crowd.
- 6:00 PM:
  - In Washington, Reagan agrees to make public his call for Marcos’ resignation.
  - Philippine Airlines chair Roman Cruz Jr. sends his resignation letter to Cory Aquino, making him the first public official to recognize her as the duly elected president.
- 7:30 PM: The United States endorses Aquino's provisional government.
- 8:10 PM:
  - Marcos and his entire family appear on television. He appeals to loyalist civilians to go to Mendiola and calls on people to obey only orders issued by him as the “duly constituted authority.”
  - He declares a 6 PM to 6 AM curfew. No one observes his curfew.
  - Enrile calls on the people to ignore the curfew, stating the country is the country of the free Filipino citizens.
- 9:00 PM:
  - A meeting between Aquino and the Ramos-Enrile group ends with a decision that her inauguration as President will be held at Club Filipino in San Juan the following morning.
  - The rebels want the inauguration to be held at Camp Crame.
- 11:00 PM:
  - In Malacañang, the Marcos children's dinner with Chief Justice Ramon Aquino and his son ends. Present are Imee and Irene and their husbands, Tommy Manotoc and Greggy Araneta, and Marcos Jr., who is dressed in fatigues.
  - Outside, people defy the curfew and continue to roam the streets of Manila.

==== February 25 ====
- 12:00 AM:
  - Marcos loyalist soldiers fire through barbed wire barricades on Nagtahan Street, injuring several people.
  - Some of the Marcoses’ belongings are taken out of Malacañang.
- 3:30 AM: Marines rejoice as orders to attack Camp Crame are canceled.
- 3:45 AM:
  - Airplanes carrying reinforcements ordered by Armed Forces Chief of Staff Gen. Fabian Ver head for Clark Air Base.
  - The troops stay there for the duration of the revolt.
- 5:00 AM:
  - On the phone to Washington, D.C., President Marcos asks U.S. Senator Paul Laxalt if he should resign. Laxalt's reply: “I think you should cut, and cut cleanly. The time has come.”
  - Marcos tells Labor Minister Blas Ople, who is in Washington lobbying for the Marcos regime, that he is not stepping down because first lady Imelda Marcos does not want him to.
- 5:15 AM: Marcos gives the go-ahead signal for his family to prepare to leave.
- 6:00 AM: Rebel soldiers advance towards the Broadcast City complex with hundreds of people with them, accompanied by a rebel S-76 helicopter.
- 8:00 AM: People are called to guard Club Filipino in San Juan in case Marcos attempts to disrupt Aquino's inauguration as president.
- 10:00 AM: Aquino arrives at Club Filipino. Opposition lawyer Neptali Gonzales reads a resolution proclaiming her and former Sen. Salvador Laurel as duly elected president and vice president.
- 10:46 AM:
  - Aquino is sworn in as president by Senior Associate Justice Claudio Teehankee, and Salvador Laurel as vice-president by Justice Vicente Abad Santos, at Club Filipino in San Juan, Metro Manila.
  - Aquino appoints Enrile as defense secretary and Ramos as AFP chief of staff.
- 11:45 AM: Marcos enters Malacañang's Ceremonial Hall for his own inauguration.
- 11:55 AM: Just as President Ferdinand Marcos addresses the crowds at Malacañang Palace, RPN-9, BBC Channel 2 and IBC-13 all sign off as rebel soldiers capture the Broadcast City complex, transmitters and studios of said stations. The New TV-4 and GMA-7 continue airing as usual. The President had just taken what would be his final inauguration oath of office beforehand.
- 3:45 PM:
  - Loyalist soldiers try to ram down barricades set up at Tomas Morato and Timog Avenues in Quezon City, but people power prevails.
  - On Nagtahan, pro-Aquino groups and loyalists coming from Marcos’ inauguration clash.
  - Crowds gather along Mendiola Street, Recto Avenue and Legarda Street to await the departure of the First Family.
- 4:30 PM: Imee Marcos’ husband, Tommy Manotoc, relays the offer of US Brig. Gen. Ted Allen to use American helicopters or boats to move Marcos from the Palace.
- 5:00 PM:
  - Marcos calls Enrile again to coordinate his departure from Malacañang.
  - His aides start packing not only clothes and books but also boxes of money that have been stored in his bedroom since the start of the election campaign. Prime Minister Cesar Virata negotiates Marcos’ departure with Aquino.
- 6:30 PM: Imee and Irene Marcos plead with their father to leave Malacañang after he tells his remaining men that he has decided to die there.
- 7:00 PM:
  - U.S. Ambassador Stephen Bosworth asks Cory Aquino if Marcos can be allowed two days in Paoay, Ilocos Norte, before heading abroad. To prevent possible regrouping of Marcos loyalists, Aquino refuses.
  - In Malacañang, luggage is loaded on boats, which proceed to Pangarap golf course across the Pasig River where U.S. helicopters are to collect the Marcoses.
- 7:30 PM: The families of Ver and Marcos crony Eduardo Cojuangco drive to Clark Air Base in Pampanga province.
- 8:40 PM: A convoy of heavily secured vehicles makes a beeline for Clark.
- 8:45 PM: The Marcoses and other government officials board helicopters at the golf course across the river from Malacañang. Some of their possessions are loaded on the choppers.
- 9:05 PM: President Marcos and his family, having left the Malacañang Palace, take off aboard U.S. helicopters for Clark Air Base. Radio Veritas and The New TV-4 announce the departure. As news of their departure reaches the people, the millions who gathered at EDSA rejoice, since their departure sparks the conclusion of the revolution.
- 9:20 PM: Within minutes of the announcement of the departure of the Marcos family, President Aquino makes her first ever live address to the nation as chief executive via Channel 4.
- 9:30 PM: Remaining members of the presidential household and employees begin to pack up and leave the palace complex while the pro-Aquino crowds began to walk to the gates.
- 9:45 PM: Marcos lands in Clark and is met by Bosworth. People in the area welcome him with chants of “Cory! Cory!”
- 9:52 PM: DZRH announces: The Marcoses have fled the country.
- 10:00 PM: US Air Force TV station FEN confirms Marcos’ departure.
- 11:30 PM: Pro-Aquino crowds force the opening of the Malacanang Palace gates, and as they open thousands of Aquino supporters and participants of the revolution storm the palace complex with little resistance.
