= Vizconde murders =

Massacre in Parañaque, Metro Manila, Philippines

- The victims of the massacre (from left to right): Jennifer, Carmela, and Estrellita Vizconde
- Location: BF Homes, Parañaque, Philippines
- Date: June 30, 1991; 35 years ago
- Target: Vizconde family
- Attack type: Murder, stabbing, rape
- Deaths: 3
- Accused: Hubert Webb
- Verdict: Inconclusive

The Vizconde murder case, colloquially known as the Vizconde massacre, was the multiple homicide of members of the Vizconde family on June 30, 1991, at their residence at 80 Vinzons Street, BF Homes, Parañaque, Metro Manila, Philippines. Estrellita Vizconde, 49, suffered thirteen stab wounds; Carmela Vizconde, 19, suffered seventeen stab wounds and had been raped before she was killed; and Anne Marie Jennifer, 7, had nineteen stab wounds. Lauro Vizconde, Estrellita's husband and the father of Carmela and Jennifer, was in the United States on business when the murders took place.

The lead suspect was Hubert Webb whose father, Freddie Webb, was famous as an actor, former basketball player and Parañaque congressman at the time of the murders. The other defendants were Antonio Lejano II, Hospicio Fernandez, Michael Gatchalian, Miguel Rodriguez, Peter Estrada, Joey Filart and Artemio Ventura. In the Trial Court (People of the Philippines vs. Hubert Webb, et al., G.R. No. 176864), it became one of the most sensational cases in the Philippines, being described as a "trial of the century". The other defendants were convicted by the Parañaque Regional Trial Court, which the Court of Appeals affirmed. With the exception of Filart and Ventura who had been convicted in absentia the men were acquitted by the Supreme Court on December 14, 2010, for failure of the prosecution to prove guilt beyond reasonable doubt.

== Case ==
The Vizconde murders remained unsolved for almost four years, until eyewitness Jessica Alfaro, a self-confessed former drug addict, came forward on April 28, 1995, to shed light on the massacre. Alfaro implicated the children of wealthy and prominent families, including Hubert Webb, Antonio Lejano II, Hospicio Fernandez, Michael Gatchalian, Miguel Rodriguez, Peter Estrada, Joey Filart and Artemio Ventura.

Alfaro's testimony coincided with the angle that was being explored by Supt. Rodolfo Sison, the police investigator originally assigned to the case in 1991. Sison was ordered to desist from further investigating that angle by then Philippine National Police Capital Region Commander Marino Filart after six members of akyat bahay gang (burglars) were arrested by Regional Police Unit in October 1991. The suspects said they were tortured and forced to confess to the crime before they were presented by Filart to the media. They were acquitted by a trial judge in September 1993 for insufficient evidence.

== Trial ==
=== Prosecution ===
The trial began in August 1995 before Parañaque RTC Judge Amelita Tolentino. Alfaro had testified that she knew the suspects and was at the Vizconde house when the crime was committed. By her account, after a drug session with the group, Webb allegedly had hatched his plan to rape Carmela Vizconde. Webb wanted Alfaro, the then-girlfriend of one of the accused men, Peter Estrada, to join them because Estrellita Vizconde only allowed her daughter to go out and entertain female visitors.

Alfaro testified that as Webb followed Carmela into the dining room, she decided to step outside for a smoke. From there she allegedly saw Lejano and Ventura take out a knife from the kitchen drawer, while the rest of the gang acted as lookouts. Alfaro said Estrellita was killed before Webb began to rape Carmela. Jennifer woke up and, seeing Webb violating her sister, jumped on him and bit him. He then hurled the little girl to a wall and started stabbing her.

Alfaro said that when she went back to the house, she saw the bodies of Estrellita and Jennifer on the bed and Webb raping Carmela on the floor. Lejano and Ventura also took turns raping Carmela, before finishing her off with numerous stabs. Alfaro said that policeman Gerardo Biong "was instructed by Webb, in my presence, to take care of the house where the incident happened". Alfaro also said that she bumped into Biong at the Faces Disco in Makati in March 1995 and relayed to her the offer of the group to give her a free ticket to the United States to shut her up. She added that suspect Miguel Rodriguez warned her to "shut up or you're gonna get killed" in the same disco on April 8, 1995, prompting her to voluntarily submit herself to the National Bureau of Investigation (NBI) for protection. According to the footage of the trial, Alfaro had been able to identify all the defendants by their names. The defense questioned Alfaro's credibility noting that she admitted to being under the influence of drugs when she allegedly witnessed the crime and had made inconsistent statements on her two affidavits. Alfaro said she was then having reservations when she first executed the first affidavit and held back vital information due to her natural reaction of mistrust.

Alfaro's testimony was corroborated by other witnesses including: Lolita Birrer, a former live-in partner of policeman Gerardo Biong, who narrated the manner of how Biong investigated and tried to cover up the crime. Birrer said she had accompanied Biong to the Vizconde house to destroy the evidence and to retrieve Webb's jacket and the murder weapon. She also testified that Biong received money at a house that she later learned belonged to then Parañaque Congressman Freddie Webb; the Webb family's maids, Mila Gaviola and Nerissa Rosales, who both testified that Hubert Webb was at home on June 30, 1991. At about 4 a.m. on June 30, 1991, Gaviola woke up and entered the bedrooms to get the Webb's dirty laundry and wash it as part of her job. She said that when she entered Hubert's room, she saw him wearing only his pants, awake and smoking in bed. While washing Hubert Webb's clothing, Gaviola said she noticed fresh bloodstains on his shirt. After she finished the laundry, she went to the servant's quarters. But feeling uneasy, she decided to go up to the stockroom near Hubert's room to see what he was doing. In the said stockroom, there is a small door going to Hubert's room and in that door there is a small opening where she used to see Hubert and his friends sniffing on something. She observed Hubert was quite irritated, uneasy, and walked to and fro inside his room. Security guards Justo Cabanacan and Normal White. Cabanacan said Webb had entered the subdivision (where the Vizconde house was located) a few days before the massacre and that he even identified himself as the son of then Congressman Webb. White, on the other hand, said he saw the three cars enter the subdivision on the night of June 29, as Alfaro had testified; White also testified that policeman Gerardo Biong was the first to arrive at the crime scene.

Other prosecution witnesses were: Carlos J. Cristobal who alleged that on March 9, 1991, he was a passenger of United Airlines Flight No. 808 bound for New York and who expressed doubt on whether Hubert Webb was his co-passenger in the trip; NBI medico-legal Dr. Prospero Cabanayan, Belen Dometita and Teofilo Minoza, two of the Vizconde maids; and Manciano Gatmaitan, an engineer.

=== Defense ===
The defense produced documents and presented 95 witnesses, including Hubert Webb himself and his father, along with other relatives and friends to support Webb's alibi that he was in the United States from March 9, 1991, to October 26, 1992. On October 1, 1996, Judge Amelita Tolentino admitted only 10 of the 142 pieces of evidence the defense presented. (Under Philippine law, generally, alibi is the weakest defense, especially where there is direct testimony of an eyewitness, duly corroborated by another. People vs. Bello, G.R. No. 124871, May 13, 2004.)

Among evidence that was not admitted by Judge Tolentino, was the note verbale from the United States Embassy in Manila claiming that Webb entered the United States in March 1991 and left in October 1992. This coincided with his passport and Philippine Immigration records but were dismissed by Tolentino due to belief that these documents can possibly be falsified. . (The Philippine Rules of Evidence require official attestation of the authenticity of any public document presented in evidence; as per Sec. 24, Rule 134, R. Evid.)

Moreover, Judge Tolentino also denied Webb's request to subject semen samples to DNA testing on the belief that the samples may no longer be intact. The accused alleged that by rejecting 132 of the 142 pieces of evidence, Tolentino had set the tone for their conviction. On July 24, 1997, the Supreme Court noted that Tolentino erred when she refused to admit the 132 pieces of evidence presented by the defense, although these were later admitted in court through an order issued by Tolentino.

Among the defense witnesses was Artemio Sacaguing, a former, now deceased NBI official who testified that Alfaro was an NBI asset who only volunteered to assume the role of the eyewitness when she could not produce the actual witness to the Vizconde killings.

Former NBI official Pedro Rivera however dismissed as lies the testimony of Sacaguing saying that "Agent Sacaguing had a record of notoriety in the NBI which prompted his transfer to remote places of assignment… until his early retirement". According to Rivera, Sacaguing was never part of the NBI team assigned to investigate the Vizconde massacre and that his former colleague took Alfaro's statement in April 1995 without the presence of a lawyer. "Sacaguing broke the guidelines in taking affidavits from witnesses. His intention was very, very dubious," he said.

=== Decision ===
On January 6, 2000, Judge Tolentino rendered her decision, finding Hubert Webb, Peter Estrada, Hospicio Fernandez, Michael Gatchalian, Antonio Lejano II and Miguel Rodriguez guilty beyond reasonable doubt of the crime of rape with homicide. They were sentenced to reclusion perpetua and ordered to indemnify the Vizconde family Php 3 million for the murders. Two of the accused remain fugitives from the law: Joey Filart and Artemio Ventura. Former Parañaque policeman Gerardo Biong was found guilty as an accessory for burning bedsheets and tampering with other evidence in the crime. He was sentenced to eleven years in prison. Biong was released from jail on November 30, 2010, after serving his sentence.

In her decision, Tolentino described the testimony of defense witnesses as full of inconsistencies and biased. She said the US-based defense witnesses, most of whom are relatives or friends of the Webb family suffered from "incorrigible and selective memory syndrome". She cited the testimony of Alex del Toro, husband of Webb's relative, who said he hired Hubert Webb as an employee at his pesticide company in California. Both Webb and del Toro could not describe in court what Hubert's work was, Tolentino said. Tolentino also found it hard to believe that Webb was working with a pesticide company because he was asthmatic and allergic to various substances. Webb's testimony was also contradicted by other US-based defense witnesses who said they usually saw him "going to the beach, malling, bar-hopping or playing basketball. Tolentino also said, the photographs and videotapes purportedly showing Webb in the United States appeared to be tampered. Tolentino said the certificates issued by the US Immigration and Naturalization Service and the Philippine Bureau of Immigration "could have easily been obtained by the powerful Webb family".

== Court of Appeals decision ==
The Court of Appeals' Third Division voted 3–2 to deny Webb's motion for reconsideration and upheld the ruling of Judge Tolentino on December 16, 2005.

The court ruled that the Parañaque RTC was correct in sentencing Webb et al. due to "overwhelming evidence that showed Webb and the other accused had conspired to rape Carmela and, in the process, kill her and the rest of the family." The court also amended the award of damages from 100,000 pesos to 200,000 pesos, and also upheld the conviction of Biong as accessory to the crime "by abusing his public functions... to conceal and destroy the physical evidence in order to prevent the discovery of the crime and by allowing the destruction of the physical evidence, Biong facilitated the escape of the principal accused."

== Supreme Court decision ==
In April 2010, the Supreme Court approved DNA testing to be performed on the semen specimen obtained during autopsy from Carmela Vizconde. This has resulted in the revelation by the National Bureau of Investigation (NBI) that they no longer had the specimens as these were remanded to the Parañaque courts.

On October 8, 2010, Webb filed an urgent motion for acquittal. On November 26, 2010, Lauro Vizconde voiced his concern to media about the purported lobbying of Senior Associate Justice Antonio Carpio for the reversal of the guilty verdict. Carpio testified for the defense during the trial. The Volunteers Against Crime and Corruption(VACC) asked Justice Antonio Carpio and his cousin Justice Conchita Carpio-Morales to take a leave while the case is being decided to avoid undue influence on the court's decision. This was categorically denied by the Supreme Court as Justice Carpio had in fact recused himself from the case and was not going to take part in the deliberation.

On December 14, 2010, the Supreme Court reversed the earlier judgment of the lower court and Court of Appeals and acquitted seven of the nine accused, including Hubert Webb, finding that the prosecution failed to prove that the accused were guilty beyond reasonable doubt. The High Court put to question the quality of the testamentary evidence furnished by the witnesses. No acquittal has been made as to the two accused, Filart and Ventura, who remain at-large. Of the 15 Justices, 7 voted for acquittal while four dissented and four Justices, including Carpio, did not participate.

=== Composition ===
Concurred (7)	Dissented (4)	Did not take part (1)	On leave (1)	Recused (2)
1. Roberto Abad; 2. Conchita Carpio-Morales; 3. Diosdado Peralta; 4. Lucas Bersamin; 5. José Pérez; 6. Jose Catral Mendoza; 7. Ma. Lourdes Sereno	1. Renato Corona; 2. Martín Villarama; 3. Teresita Leonardo-de Castro; 4. Arturo Brion	1. Antonio Carpio	1. Presbitero Velasco, Jr.	1. Antonio Eduardo Nachura; 2. Mariano del Castillo

=== Concurring opinion ===
Seven justices based its decision on the following points:

1. Loss of DNA evidence not a ground for outright acquittal
2. Unreliability of Jessica Alfaro's testimony:
  - Alfaro had prior knowledge on the facts of the case having been an asset of the National Bureau of Investigation (NBI)
  - Alfaro was not able to explain why the house was ransacked if robbery was not the motive of Webb and his group
3. Unreliability of testimony from other witnesses
4. Webb's strong alibi that he was in the United States
  - Alfaro's testimony will fall apart if Webb was not at the crime scene and will relieve the others accused of the crime

==== Loss of DNA evidence ====
Webb, citing Brady v. Maryland, said "that he is entitled to outright acquittal on the ground of violation of his right to due process given the State’s failure to produce on order of the Court either by negligence or willful suppression the semen specimen taken from Carmela." The court argued that the cited case has been superseded by Arizona v. Youngblood, "where the U.S. Supreme Court held that due process does not require the State to preserve the semen specimen although it might be useful to the accused unless the latter is able to show bad faith on the part of the prosecution or the police".

The court considered the accused's "lack of interest in having such test done" in which they concluded that the state "cannot be deemed put on reasonable notice that it would be required to produce the semen specimen at some future time".

==== Alfaro's testimony ====
The court ruled that Alfaro was "a stool pigeon, one who earned her living by fraternizing with criminals so she could squeal on them to her NBI handlers." The court also said that it was "possible for Alfaro to lie" on the details of the case. Alfaro, who had "practically lived" at the NBI's offices, would have been able to hear about the details, and gain access to the documents, without difficulty. The court noted the inconsistency between Alfaro's testimony of Webb being Carmela's boyfriend, who had no reason in breaking the glass panel of the house's front door to enter the house; Alfaro said that Webb "picked up some stone and, out of the blue, hurled it at the glass-paneled front door". Alfaro, upon explaining on how the house was ransacked, (the Parañaque police had earlier blamed house robbers as suspects), said that Ventura was looking for the front-door key and the car key.

The court said the "portion of Alfaro's story appears tortured to accommodate the physical evidence of the ransacked house" adding that "it is a story made to fit in with the crime scene although robbery was supposedly not the reason Webb and his companions entered that house". The court also said the same for the issue of the garage light: she claimed that Ventura climbed the car's hood, using a chair, to turn the light off. But, unlike the house robbers, however the court points out that "Webb and his friends did not have anything to do in a darkened garage." In general, the court said that Alfaro's story "lacks sense or suffers from inherent inconsistencies."

==== Corroborating witnesses ====
The court held that security guard Normal E. White, Jr.'s testimony was unreliable. White was mistaken in saying that Gatchalian and company went in and out of the gated community many times, since they only entered once. Justo Cabanacan, the security supervisor of the gated community, said that he saw Webb enter the gated community, although he did not record Webb entering in his log book.

The court also held that the testimony of the Webb's maid, Mila Gaviola, was also unreliable since she was not able to distinguish if it was Hubert whom she saw on June 30, 1991, nor "did she remember any of the details that happened in the household on the other days".

==== Webb's alibi ====
The court said that "among the accused, Webb presented the strongest alibi". The lower courts, however, reasoned that "Webb's alibi cannot stand against Alfaro's positive identification of him." The court said that Alfaro was not a credible witness and that her "story of what she personally saw must be believable, not inherently contrived".

For the alibi to be established "the accused must prove by positive, clear, and satisfactory evidence... that he was present at another place at the time of the perpetration of the crime, and that it was physically impossible for him to be at the scene of the crime". The lower courts, the Supreme Court said, held that "Webb was actually in Parañaque when the Vizconde killings took place". However, the court pointed out that while Webb or his parents may be able to "arrange for the local immigration to put a March 9, 1991 departure stamp on his passport and an October 27, 1992 arrival stamp", they could not fix a foreign airlines’ passenger manifest, and the U.S. Immigration's record system. The court also said that if Webb was in the U.S. when the crime was committed, the Alfaro's testimony would not hold together: "Without it, the evidence against the others must necessarily fall."

==== Conclusion ====
The court maintained that for a person to be convicted there should not be "a reasonable, lingering doubt as to his guilt." As a result, the court reverses the decision of the Court of Appeals, and acquits Webb, et al.

=== Dissenting opinion ===
In his dissenting opinion, Justice Villarama argued that the claim of Webb that he could not have committed the crime because he left for the United States on March 9, 1991, and returned to the Philippines only on October 26, 1992, was correctly rejected by the Regional Trial Court and Court of Appeals. Given the financial resources and political influence of his family, it was not unlikely that Webb could have traveled back to the Philippines before June 29–30, 1991 and then departed for the US again, and returning to the Philippines in October 1992. Webb's travel documents and other paper trail of his stay in the US are unreliable proof of his absence in the Philippines at the time of the commission of the crime charged. Webb's reliance on the presumption of regularity of official functions, stressing the fact that the US-INS certifications are official documents, is misplaced. The presumption leaned on is disputable and can be overcome by evidence to the contrary. In this case, the existence of an earlier negative report on the NIIS record on file concerning the entry of appellant Webb into and his exit from the US on March 9, 1991, and October 26, 1992, respectively, had raised serious doubt on the veracity and accuracy of the subsequently issued second certification dated August 31, 1995, which is based merely on a computer print-out of his alleged entry on March 9, 1991, and departure on October 26, 1992. Villarama noted that the alleged Passport, Passenger Manifest of United Airlines Flight and United Airline ticket of accused Webb offered in evidence were mere photocopies of an alleged original, which were never presented. He adds, this Court takes judicial notice of reported irregularities and tampering of passports in the years prior to the recent issuance by the Department of Foreign Affairs(DFA) of machine-readable passports.

=== Reactions to Webb's acquittal ===
==== Pro ====
- Freddie Webb: "Kami right now are on cloud nine. Bago sa lahat, there is so much to be thankful for (Right now we are on Cloud Nine. There is so much to be thankful for)"."You have to understand he has lost 15 years of his life. Since day one, we were saying he was in the United States but only a few people believed it. We cannot blame them because at that time, there were so many things being written in the newspapers that, if I didn't know anything about the case, I would be the one to throw a stone at Hubert Webb. The emotions are there because we are talking of 15 years wasted in the life of my son. He lost the most critical years of any person, that's from 26 years old to 41. He should not be in jail not for a minute or even a second ".
- Former National Bureau of Investigation (1992–1995) Director Epimaco Velasco: “I maintain my position. It was not Hubert. Walang pruweba na magpapatunay na sina Hubert Webb ang pumatay" (There's no proof it was Hubert Webb who killed [Vizconde family])
- Winnie Monsod: I cannot speak for all the SC justices who were part of either the voting majority or the minority. But there are two justices whose integrity I can vouch for: Justice Conchita Carpio Morales and Justice Ma. Lourdes Sereno, who both not only voted for acquittal, but also wrote a concurring opinion and a separate concurring opinion, respectively. But other than that, Vizconde's charge does not seem to be supported by the history of the case, because if money could really buy the decision in this case, why were these wealthy people in jail for 15 years?
- Ramon Tulfo: "With my defense of Webb’s innocence, I feel that I won in the grand lotto jackpot."
- Gary Valenciano: “Whatever has transpired now is only a step closer to more answers for the questions that have been asked. I’m happy for the Webb family. Hubert is basically going to begin from the very, very beginning. I can only wish him the best this time. But I’m confident, he’s got a good family backing him up”
- Democrito Barcenas, former Integrated Bar of the Philippines Cebu City president and regional coordinator of the Free Legal Assistance Group (FLAG): “I think that most of the justices are right in their decision. I expected this decision because since the start, I knew that Jessica Alfaro was not entirely telling the truth”.
- Cebu City Councilor Sisinio Andales, a lawyer, said he trusts in the wisdom of the justices of the Supreme Court.
- Roman Catholic Diocese of Novaliches Bishop-Emeritus Teodoro Bacani: "Si Hubert Webb talagang sa paniniwala ko ay walang sala at kaya naman ako naniniwala diyan ay mayroon akong kaibigan na nasa States na nandun sa kanila si Hubert Webb noong diumano ay pinatay ang itong anak ni Lauro Vizconde. (I believe Hubert Webb is innocent. Because I have a friend in the States who said that Hubert Webb was there when the murders happened)

==== Con ====
- Lauro Vizconde: "Is there still anyone among you who doubts that there is rampant corruption in our government? Remember when I made the disclosure that someone is pressuring the justices to vote for a reversal? I did that hoping to make them have second thoughts about doing so,”.“There is no justice in the Philippines. All of us who have cases in court, don’t we realize that if your opponent has money, brace yourself. Anyone can be paid!"
- Jessica Alfaro: Alfaro's e-mail from abroad read. “I stand by my story. Am I dismayed by the decision of the (Supreme Court)? Yes, but what can I do (?). I am not an NBI agent nor an NBI asset. That's all crap! Eh di sana may sweldo ako. Di naman ako puwede magtrabaho don” (If that's the case, then I should have had a salary. But I could not work there) "Nasira ang buhay ko para lang sa inyo and then ganito pa ang nangyari. Ayaw akong paniwalaan. Ayoko na! Alfaro told Lauro Vizconde. (My life has been destroyed for you, and then this is what happened. They would not believe me! I've had it!)."
- Former National Bureau of Investigation (1995–1996) Director Mariano Mison: “Hindi ako pabor sa naging desisyon ng Korte Suprema. Ginawa namin ang tama. Matagal na akong nagtitimpi. I refute all arguments,” (I'm not in favor of the Supreme Court's Decision. We did what is right. I've been holding myself back. I refute all arguments)
- Volunteers Against Crime and Corruption chairman Dante Jimenez: "Pera talaga ang laging umiiral sa ating hustisya (Money always prevails in our justice system)".
- Former Sandiganbayan Justice Manuel Pamaran: “When it comes to the appreciation of facts especially on the testimony of the witness, the trial court should be given the credence because it has the first opportunity to observe the demeanor, gesture and tone of voice of the witness".
- Presiding Justice of Sandiganbayan Edilberto Sandoval:“The one who tried the case is in the best position to know whether the witness is telling the truth or not because he has the opportunity which is denied the appellate justices to observe the demeanor of the witness".
- Ateneo law professor Alan Paguia: "The order of release is questionable as it appears to be undemocratic. It was based on the rule of the minority and not the majority as they (the SC justices) had enunciated in Fortich v. Corona." “Thus the SC decision on the Vizconde massacre is flawed,” Paguia averred, citing a portion of Fortich v. Corona, 312 SCRA 751, at 758 where the SC itself ruled that unless the minimum number of EIGHT votes for a majority is attained there is no decision to speak of, therefore the release order of the Webb group should not have been signed.
- Former Vice President Teofisto Guingona: Guingona said he believes that Hubert Webb and his six other co-accused are guilty of the Vizconde massacre in June 1991.

== Aftermath ==
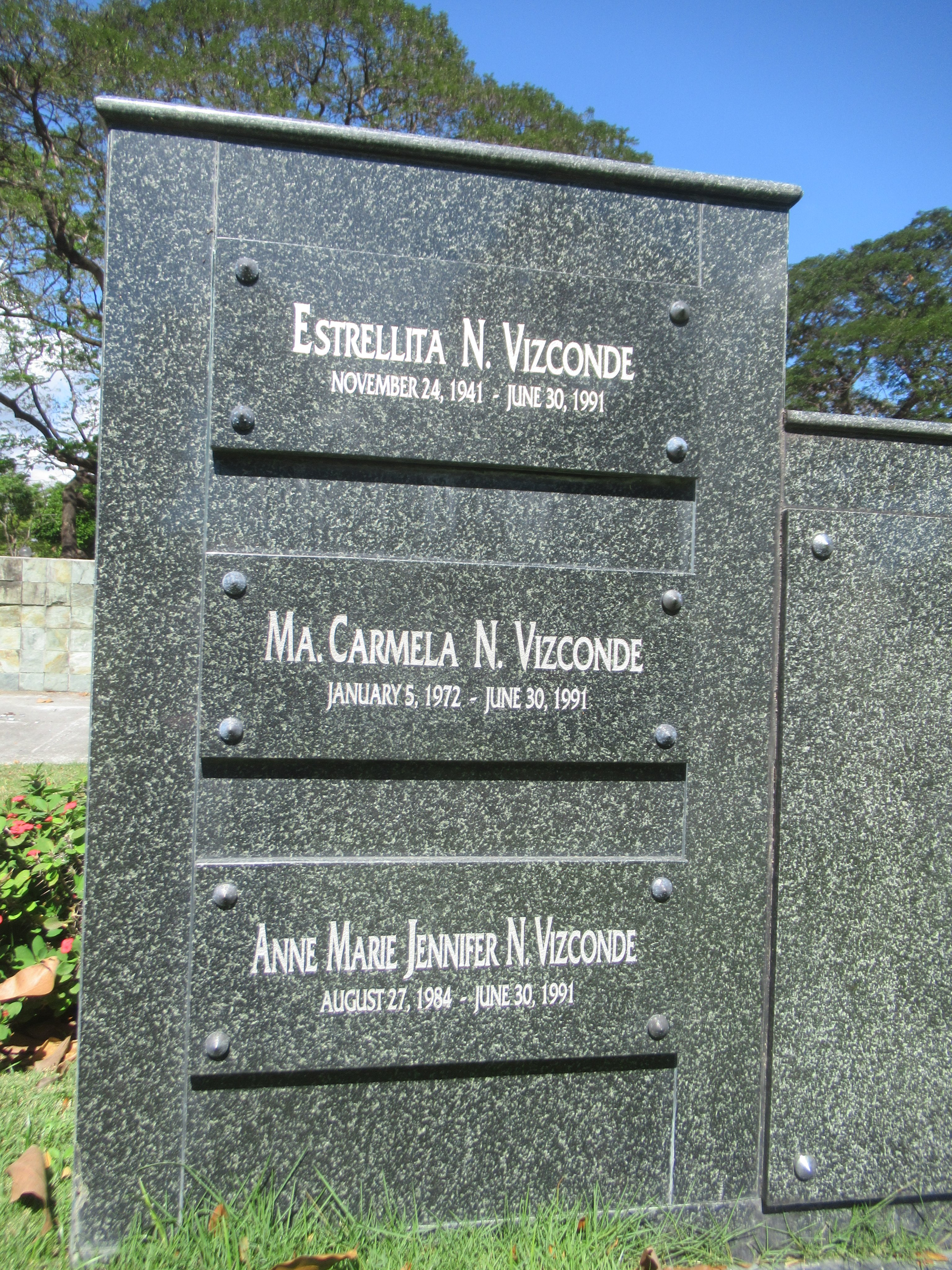
Jennifer, Carmela, and Estrellita Vizconde's tomb at Manila Memorial Park – Sucat.

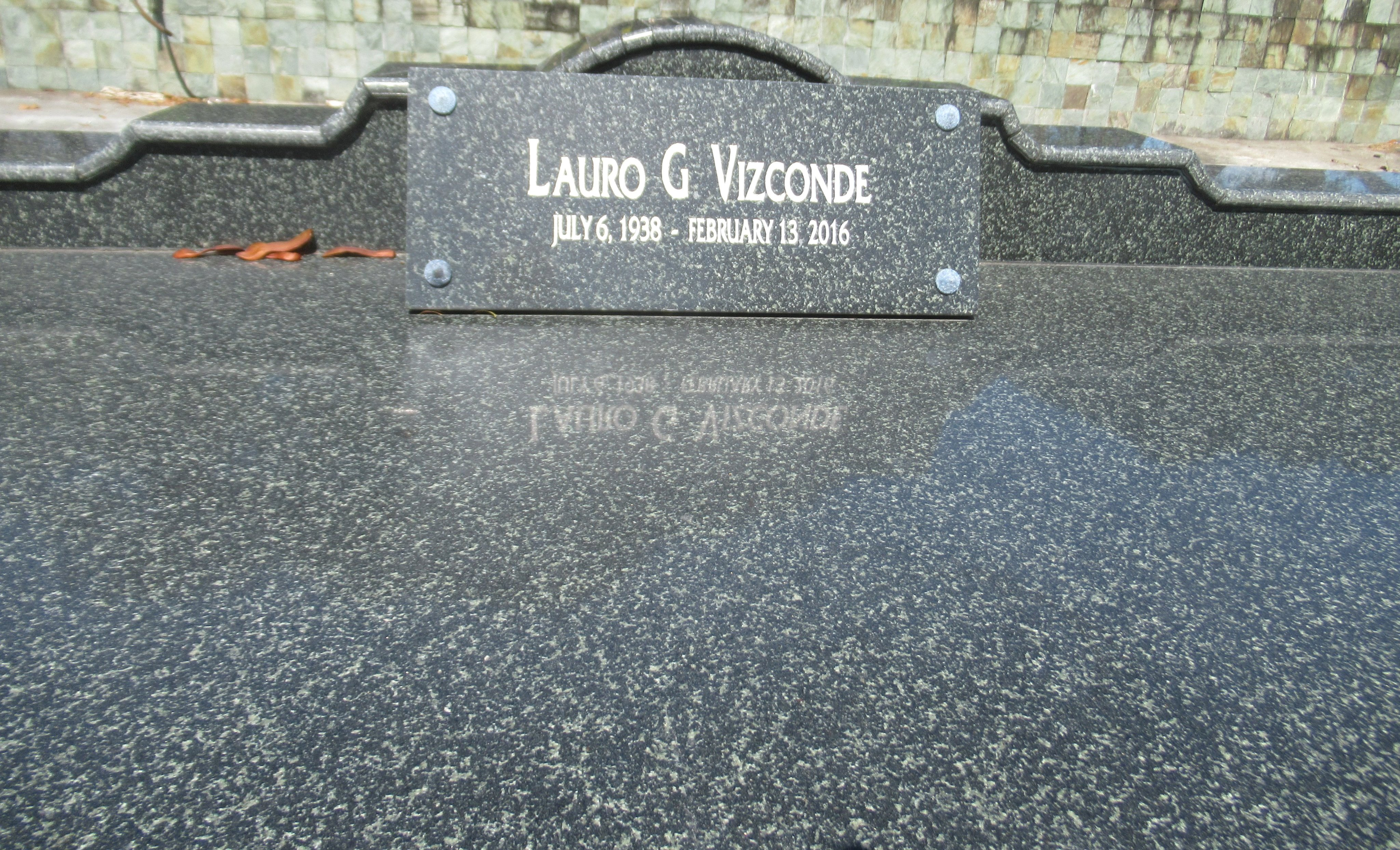
Lauro Vizconde's tomb at Manila Memorial Park – Sucat.

In three separate occasions, police authorities mistakenly arrested persons they believed to be suspect Joey Filart: a namesake in August 1995, the same person again in February 2000, and a person from Compostela Valley in March 2000. In October 2000, family patriarch Lauro Vizconde adopted a 17-month-old boy whose father was one of the 10 people killed in an ambush in Sara, Iloilo in August 1998; the mother, Rosalinda Sotic, permitted the adoption. By 2001, Vizconde acknowledged that he had already forgiven the perpetrators.

President Benigno Aquino III ordered the law enforcement agencies to re-investigate the case six months before the prescription period lapses in 2011. He also ordered the Secretary of Justice Leila de Lima to study the possibility of giving compensation to Webb and others.

On December 28, 2010, new witnesses have come forward accusing Hubert Webb and others of allegedly being behind the Vizconde massacre. Other witnesses say Webb was in the Philippines at the time of the murders.

On January 4, 2011, Justice Secretary Leila de Lima said suspect Joey Filart was spotted in the United States.

On January 18, 2011, the Supreme Court denied Lauro Vizconde's motion to reverse the acquittal because of double jeopardy. On March 18, Hubert Webb filed a lawsuit against Jessica Alfaro for false testimony at the Parañaque Prosecutor's Office. On June 14, 2011, Hubert Webb filed a ₱180,000 (equivalent to ₱239,131 in 2021) compensation claim for "unlawful conviction" for the Vizconde massacre.

Lauro Vizconde, founding president of the Volunteers Against Crime and Corruption, died on February 13, 2016, at the age of 77 after suffering a series of heart attacks. He was laid to rest at Manila Memorial Park – Sucat on February 17. The remains of his wife and daughters were also exhumed from their tomb at Holy Cross Memorial Park in Quezon City and transferred to his tomb.

== Result of the reinvestigation ==
The Inter-Agency Task Force assigned to reinvestigate Vizconde massacre case formed 6 teams or 3 parallel teams to look into 3 sets of suspects linked to the murders. The 3 sets of suspects are: the Barroso Akyat-Bahay gang; the group of construction workers with engineer Danilo Agwas tagged as mastermind; SPO3 Angel Viaje, PO3 Rodolfo Colado, Ruben Pineda; and, the group of Hubert Webb.

On June 28, 2011, Justice Secretary Leila De Lima said Hubert Webb was in the Philippines when the murders took place. This contradicted Hubert Webb's claim that he was in the United States from March 9, 1991, to October 27, 1992. De Lima said the evidence that showed Webb and any of the co-accused were in the country came from the magnetic reel tape (MRT) of the Philippine Bureau of Immigration (BI) where all records of incoming and outgoing passengers from the Philippines are recorded. The tapes were restored by IBM while being monitored by the National Computer Center. "There was entry of (former senator) Freddie Webb leaving the country in March 1991 but no Hubert Webb," De Lima said. She said the same MRT provided data that several Webbs arrived in the country, including Hubert, sometime in October 1992. “It is hard to believe this – there is a record of supposed arrival from other country but no record of departure in 1991 or in any month of 1991,” she said. De Lima also said seven new witnesses claimed they saw Webb in the country during the months of April, May and June 1991. According to De Lima, all the new witnesses passed the polygraph test. The witnesses include an electrician, a drug dealer, a couple of neighborhood basketball players, a hairdresser and a village security guard. Pitong, an electrician who since 1982, already knew the Webb family claimed he saw a laundry woman wash a bloodied T-shirt on the morning of the crime. He also claimed to have heard Hubert shout, "Putang ina nyo! Kung di ninyo ako pinabayaan, 'di ako magkakaganito." (Fuck you all! I would not have ended up like this if you had not neglected me). Three days after that, he was allegedly approached by Mrs. Webb who reportedly told him, "You did not see anything." A week after, Sen. Freddie Webb allegedly told him, "You did not see anything. You will regret it." Jack, a village security guard who kept records of the village where Webb lived said he saw Hubert Webb during the time of the massacre. George, a drug dealer, claimed he was introduced to Webb by former SPO1 Gerardo Biong sometime in April 1991 where the young Webb allegedly purchased from him 10 grams of shabu worth P10,000. He alleged that Webb bought illegal drugs from him on two other occasions in May 1991. He alleged that he could not forget Webb because Biong had allegedly threatened him, “Do not cheat him. I will kill you,” brandishing a shiny revolver. Mario, a hair stylist during the period June 1991, testified that Webb, along with Tony Boy Lejano and Dong Ventura had their haircut. He said that he heard Hubert Webb quarreling with another young looking customer. Rey and Jerry claimed they saw Webb playing basketball between the months of June and July 1991 during a league in BF Homes.

The findings also point to another set of suspects, namely Dong Villadolid and his brother Bing. The Villadolid brothers were mentioned by a certain Rhoda Pujanes alias Dang, who claimed she overheard Villadolid and his friends, including Miguel Rodriguez and Michael Gatchalian (both co-accused of Webb), talking about the massacre during a pot session in 1991. Dang claimed to have heard Dong Villadolid shouting at the top of his voice, saying they had raped and killed a certain Maria (presumed to be Maria Carmela Vizconde) and other persons. She also said that Bing was accosting Ging Rodriguez on why he had to stab and kill a young girl. De Lima believed Dong Villadolid is the same person as Dong Ventura, one of the co-accused who fled to the US following the massacre. Another accused, Joey Filart also fled to the United States. De Lima said they could still go after Filart and Ventura, as well as the Villadolid brothers, since the prescriptive period of 20 years for homicide does not apply to them because they were abroad. One team uncovered “Black Maria,” a woman whom one witness said had told him she was with Webb's group inside the Vizconde home and saw the crime take place. “She admitted to knowing Webb and company but denied knowledge of the Vizconde massacre,” NBI Death Investigation Division head Romulo Asis said. De Lima said it was possible that it was Black Maria who was in the Vizconde home and not Jessica Alfaro, the NBI's star witness during the trial.

Although Webb's group can no longer be retried because of double jeopardy, De Lima said the purpose of the reinvestigation was to “uncover the truth” and bring closure to Lauro Vizconde.

== In popular culture ==
Prior to the 1995 trial, the massacre and its surrounding events were already depicted in two films written and directed by comic book writer Carlo J. Caparas: The Vizconde Massacre: God, Help Us! (1993), starring Kris Aquino as Carmela Vizconde, and The Untold Story: Vizconde Massacre II – May the Lord Be with Us! (1994), starring Vina Morales as Carmela and Joko Diaz as an assailant.

The 1995 film The Jessica Alfaro Story, directed by Francis 'Jun' Posadas, focused on the titular witness, portrayed by Alice Dixson. The case was featured on a Philippine TV show Case Unclosed as its ninth episode, "Vizconde Massacre Case"".

By 2000, Lauro Vizconde himself attempted to sell the film rights to his family's story for ₱10 million to film studios in order to produce a fourth film and provide money to other victims of heinous crimes, though it did not come to fruition.

== Timeline of the massacre case ==
- Night of June 29–30, 1991 – Estrellita, Carmela and Jennifer Vizconde were killed in their Parañaque home; Carmela was found to have been raped.
- April 28, 1995 – Jessica Alfaro presents herself as a witness and accuses Hubert Webb, et al. of murder.
- October 1, 1996 – Judge Amelita Tolentino of the Parañaque RTC rejected 132 of the defense's 142 pieces of evidence.
- January 6, 2000 – Tolentino finds Webb, et al. guilty beyond reasonable doubt of murder and sentences them to reclusion perpetua.
- December 15, 2005 – The Court of Appeals dismisses the defendants' appeal.
- December 14, 2010 – The Supreme Court acquits Webb, et al., except for the two defendants tried in absentia.

== See also ==
- Hultman-Chapman murder case (People vs. Claudio Teehankee, Jr.), another high-profile criminal case decided by the Supreme Court, occurred a fortnight after the massacre.
- List of massacres in the Philippines
- List of unsolved murders (1980–1999)
