= Rent-sangla scam =

Philippine scam of mortgaging rental cars

A rent-sangla scam, also known as rent-tangay scam, is a confidence trick that began to be performed in the Philippines in early 2017.

According to local reports, victims of a so-called ‘rent-sangla’ (rent-mortgage) scam reported discovering that they had fallen victim to fraudulent promises of rental income, after learning that their vehicles had been mortgaged or sold to other parties without their knowledge. Eight individuals, five of them from Laguna province, had been charged for violations of Article 315 of the Philippine Revised Penal Code, concerning large-scale swindling (estafa), and in relation to Presidential Decree 1689 (which increased the penalty of certain forms of swindling/estafa). Fearing that the suspects might flee the country, the victims asked the Department of Justice (DOJ) to issue immigration lookout bulletins/orders against suspects Martin Perez, Tychicus Historillo Nambio, Rafaela Anunciacion (the supposed mastermind of the scam), and Lea Constantino Rosales. Justice Secretary Vitaliano Aguirre later announced that approximately 500 vehicles had already been seized by law enforcement authorities in Cavite and Laguna.

Anunciacion was arrested on 2 March in Laguna by members of the Philippine National Police Regional Highway Patrol Group (PNP-HPG), but was released after posting bail of ₱40,000. A total of 200 complaints were filed against Anunciacion and Nambio.

In mid-March 2017, Aguirre announced that the NBI would be filing a separate complaint against those responsible for the scam. He also noted that 184 out of 300 vehicles snatched by the scheme have been returned to their respective owners. According to PNP-HPG, around 1,800 vehicles have reportedly been victimized by the scheme, but that 107 of confirmed 457 stolen vehicles were recovered during police operations in Metro Manila, Southern Tagalog, and Central Luzon.

On August 25, 2018, the alleged mastermind Rafaela Anunciacion was arrested again by the PNP-HPG.
