= Hubert Webb =

Filipino former convict

- Born: Hubert Jeffrey Pagaspas Webb; November 7, 1968 (age 57); San Diego, California, U.S.
- Political party: PMP (since 2016)
- Spouse: Cecille Perez (m. 2016)
- Children: 1

Hubert Jeffrey Pagaspas Webb (born November 7, 1968), is the third son of former senator Freddie Webb, as well as the brother of Pinky Webb and Jason Webb. He gained prominence as a suspect in the Vizconde murders. After being acquitted in 2010, Hubert - part of the Webb political dynasty of Parañaque - ran as a representative in the 2016 Philippine general election for the position of city councilor of first district of Paranaque, after his brother Jason served his third last term for the same position, his father Freddie having served the at-large Paranaque district - later split into two districts - for the 8th Congress of the Philippines.

== Vizconde murders ==
Webb was the prime suspect of the infamous homicide that occurred on June 30, 1991. On April 28, 1995, National Bureau of Investigations asset and self-confessed drug user Jessica Alfaro came forward to police authorities to shed light on the killing of the Vizconde family. In a decision dated January 6, 2000, Parañaque Regional Trial Court Judge Amelita Tolentino convicted Webb and the co-accused Antonio Lejano II, Peter Estrada (Alfaro's former boyfriend), Hospicio Fernandez, Michael Gatchalian and Miguel Rodriguez, and sentenced them to life imprisonment. Remained charged and being fugitives until now are Joey Filart and Artemio Ventura. Also found guilty and sentenced to fifteen years in prison for destroying evidence was Parañaque City policeman Gerardo Biong. On November 30, 2010, Biong was released from jail.

== Acquittal ==
On December 14, 2010, Webb with companions Lejano, Gatchalian, Rodriguez, Fernandez and Estrada, was acquitted by the Supreme Court of all charges after fifteen years and four months of imprisonment upon finding that the prosecution failed to prove that the accused are guilty beyond reasonable doubt. Voting seven for, four against, and four abstaining, the justices concluded that Jessica Alfaro was not an actual eyewitness to the crime, but a National Bureau of Investigation (NBI) asset pretending to be an eyewitness.
