= Reynaldo Wycoco =

Philippine police official (1946–2005)

18th Director of the National Bureau of Investigation
- In office January 25, 2001 – December 19, 2005
- President: Gloria Macapagal Arroyo
- Preceded by: Carlos S. Caabay (OIC)
- Succeeded by: Nestor Manrique Mantaring

Personal details
- Born: Reynaldo G. Wycoco; November 10, 1946 Nueva Ecija, Philippines
- Died: December 19, 2005 (aged 59) Manila Doctors Hospital; Ermita, Manila, Philippines
- Resting place: Libingan ng mga Bayani, Taguig
- Education: Philippine Military Academy (BS); Harvard Kennedy School (MPA)
- Police career
- Service: Philippine National Police
- Allegiance: Philippines
- Divisions: National Capital Region Police Office; Office of the deputy chief for administration; Office of Spokesperson, PNP
- Service years: 1968–2001
- Rank: Police Deputy Director General

Reynaldo G. Wycoco (November 10, 1946 – December 19, 2005) was a Filipino retired police officer who formerly served as Director of the National Bureau of Investigation.

== Career ==
=== Police service ===
Hails from Cabiao, Nueva Ecija and graduate of class 1968 in the Philippine Military Academy, Wycoco served in the Philippine Constabulary (PC) as member of Ranger Battalion in 1969, where he was assigned as the Battalion Intelligence and Operations Officer in Tarlac. This is the time where Central Luzon was a center of communist armed insurgency.

In 1980, still at service, he obtained his Master's degree in Public Administration from the Kennedy School of Government, Harvard University. He also take short graduate courses at the London School of Economics, as he believes that "if you don’t innovate, you’ll stagnate" and for the improving of police work, especially with cooperating with the community. He also studied in the US Army Intelligence Center in Arizona and in the intriguingly named Political Warfare and Allied Intelligence School in Taiwan, as he think that learning of right collection and handling of information, can be a crucial change for a country.

When the PC became the Philippine National Police (PNP), he became a police officer specializing in intelligence. Later, Wycoco served as chief of the National Capital Region Police Office (NCRPO) in 1998 until 1999. He also served as spokesperson of the PNP, and retired with the rank of now called Police Lieutenant General (then known as Police Deputy Director General) while serving as deputy chief for administration in 2001.

=== NBI director ===
He was appointed by President Gloria Macapagal Arroyo as the NBI director on January 25, 2001, and his appointment was criticized due to lack of background to law or not being a lawyer. He was tasked to lead an investigation against the crimes of Joseph Estrada's Presidential Anti-Organized Crime Task Force (PAOCTF). And while in the middle of Wycoco's tenure, NBI solve more high-profile cases.

== Popular culture ==
Wycoco appeared in 2003 film NBI Files: The Cory Quirino Kidnap, and credited by some showbiz columnists that he looks like an action star.

== Personal life ==
He is a member of religious sect Iglesia ni Cristo. After him, another member of the said sect was appointed as director of NBI, named Magtanggol Gatdula, also a former police general and lawyer formerly headed the Quezon City Police District.

== Death ==
When Wycoco still the NBI director, he suffered stroke resulted to coma on November 23, 2005. He died at the age of 59 on December 19, 2005, at the Manila Doctor's Hospital in Ermita, Manila due to hemorrhagic stroke. He was buried at the Libingan ng mga Bayani on December 24, 2005.
