= Mariano Mison =

Filipino lawyer and former National Bureau of Investigation director

Mariano M. Mison

14th Director of the National Bureau of Investigation
- In office July 4, 1995 – February 3, 1996
- Preceded by: Antonio D. Aragon
- Succeeded by: Santiago Y. Toledo

Personal details
- Born: Mariano M. Mison
- Died: Philippines
- Profession: Lawyer

Mariano M. Mison, is a Filipino lawyer formerly served as 14th Director of the National Bureau of Investigation from 1995 until 1996. He was publicly known for being the lead investigator of NBI on Vizconde massacre in the early 90s.
