= Palaban =

Philippine television public affairs show

- Title card
- Genre: Public affairs
- Presented by: Solita Monsod; Miriam Quiambao; Malou Mangahas
- Country of origin: Philippines
- Original language: Tagalog

Production
- Camera setup: Multiple-camera setup
- Running time: 60 minutes
- Production company: GMA News and Public Affairs

Original release
- Network: GMA Network
- Release: November 8, 2006 – November 14, 2007

Palaban (transl. fighter) is a Philippine television public affairs show broadcast by GMA Network. Hosted by Winnie Monsod, Miriam Quiambao and Malou Mangahas, it premiered on November 8, 2006. The show concluded on November 14, 2007.

== Hosts ==
Hosts

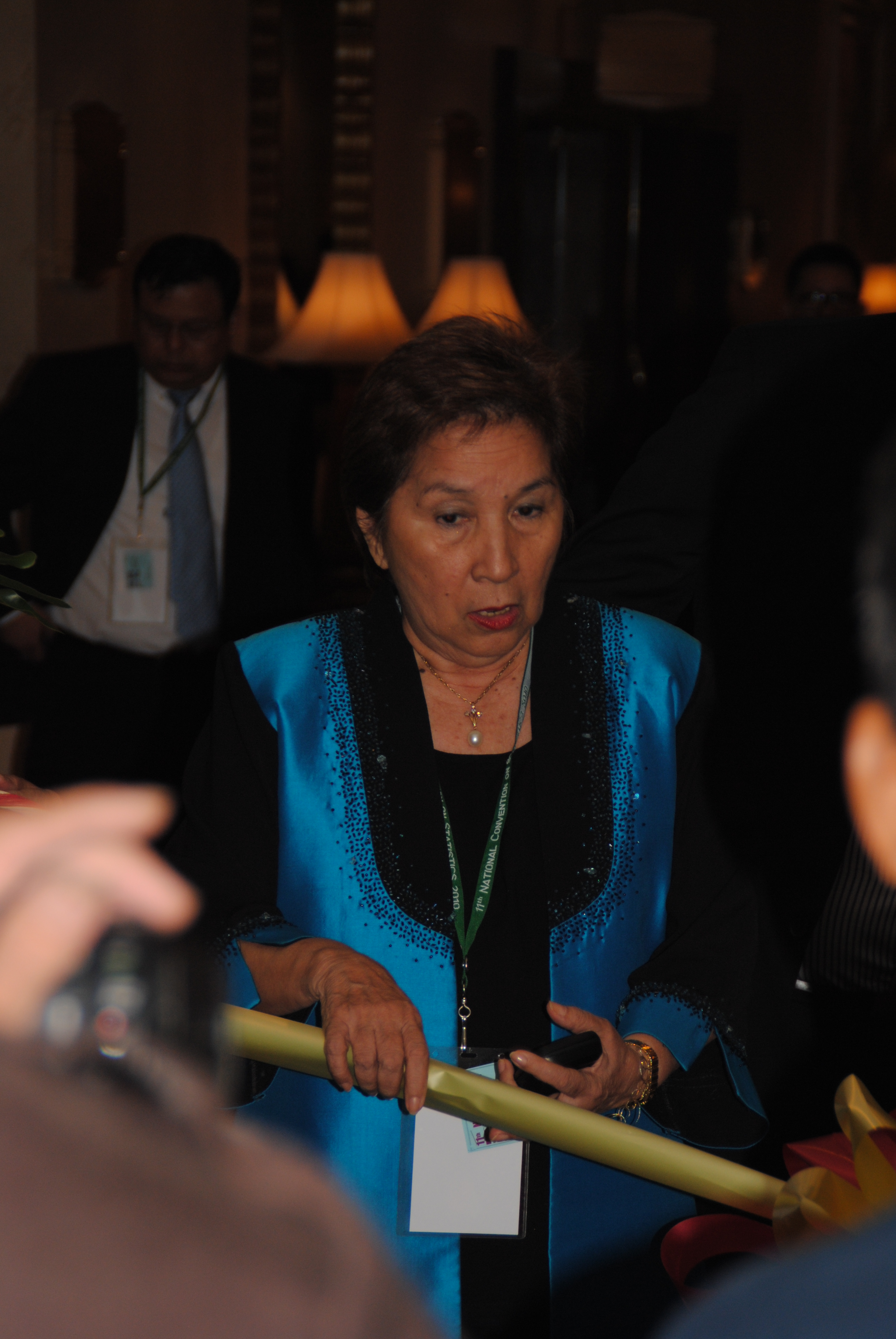
Winnie Monsod

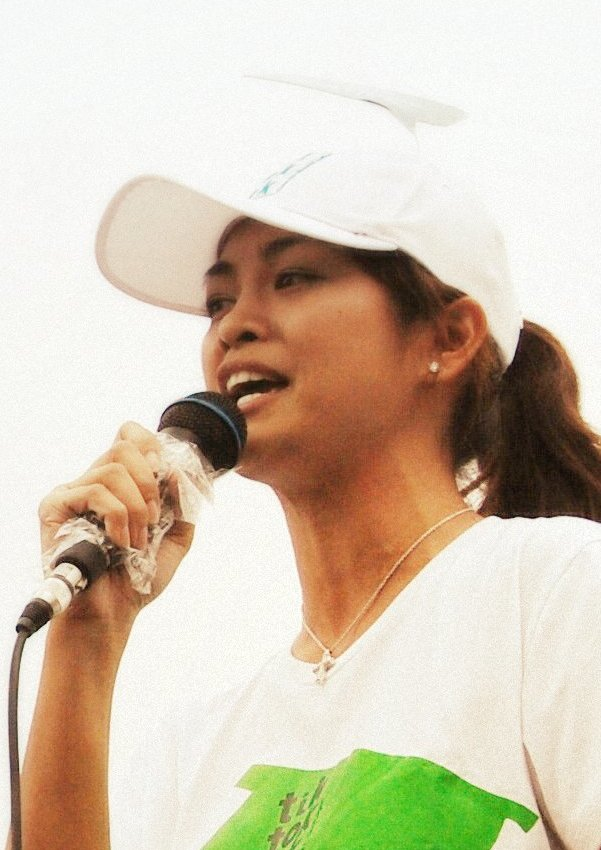
Miriam Quiambao

- Winnie Monsod
- Miriam Quiambao
- Malou Mangahas

== Accolades ==
Accolades received by Palaban
Year	Award	Category	Recipient	Result	Ref.
2007	21st PMPC Star Awards for Television	Best Public Affairs Program	Palaban	Nominated	
2007	21st PMPC Star Awards for Television	Best Public Affairs Program Host	Malou Mangahas Winnie Monsod Miriam Quiambao	Nominated	
