= Magtanggol Gatdula =

Retired police general and lawyer

20th Director of the National Bureau of Investigation
- In office 2010–2012
- President: Noynoy Aquino
- Preceded by: Nestor Manrique Mantaring
- Succeeded by: Nonnatus Caesar Rojas

Personal details
- Born: Magtanggol Gatdula Philippines
- Education: Bicol University (Ph.D.); Batangas State University (MPA); University of the East (LLB); Philippine Military Academy (BS)
- Police career
- Service: Philippine National Police
- Allegiance: Philippines
- Divisions: Directorate for ICT Management; Directorate for Logistics; Quezon City Police District
- Service years: 1976–2010
- Rank: Police Director

Magtanggol B. Gatdula was a Filipino lawyer and retired police officer who formerly served as Director of the National Bureau of Investigation.

== Career ==
=== Police service ===
Graduate of class 1976 in the Philippine Military Academy, Gatdula served as a deputy in Ping Lacson's Presidential Anti-Organized Crime Task Force (PAOCTF), as its chief for operations.

Before being appointed as Quezon City Police District (QCPD) chief in 2006, Gatdula was a member of the district as one of its deputies. He led the district on steps on modernizing. After his stint with the QCPD, he served in the Directorate for Logistics and later on, as Directorate for ICT Management until his retirement in 2010.

=== NBI director ===
He was appointed by President Noynoy Aquino as the NBI director. His appointment gained controversy as his appointment allegedly backed by Iglesia Ni Cristo (which Gatdula is also a member), but he later dismissed the allegation. But later, Gatdula said that he got the support of the said church in a TV interview. Gatula was the second member of the sect to be NBI director, the first one was Reynaldo Wycoco, also a former police general and former NCRPO director.

The allegations of ambushing Deputy Director Esmeralda and extorting a Japanese national made him fired by President Aquino in 2012. But the charges and allegations against him later cleared.
