= Vicente Valdepeñas Jr. =

Filipino economist

4th Director-General of the National Economic and Development Authority Concurrently Minister of Economic Planning
- In office 1984–1985
- President: Ferdinand Marcos
- Preceded by: Cesar Virata
- Succeeded by: Solita Monsod

Personal details
- Education: Cornell University
- Occupation: Banker
- Profession: Economist

Vicente Valdepeñas Jr. was the 4th Minister of Economic Planning and concurrent Director-General of the National Economic and Development Authority (NEDA) from 1983 to 1986 under the presidency of the late strongman Ferdinand Marcos. He earned his Ph.D. in economics from Cornell University from Ithaca, New York. He is currently a consultant to the Bangko Sentral ng Pilipinas (Central Bank of the Philippines). In the duration of his stay at NEDA, he was also a concurrent member of the Monetary Board.

Valdepeñas served as a consultant of the Swedish International Development Authority on Bank Supervision since 1990 and of Citibank on external debt rescheduling, rationalization of bank investment portfolio and public policy analysis since 1986.

Preceded by Cesar Virata	Director-General of the National Economic and Development Authority; 1984 – 1985	Succeeded by Winnie Monsod
