= Cesar Virata =

Prime Minister of the Philippines from 1981 to 1986 (1930–2026)

His Excellency Cesar Virata KGCR
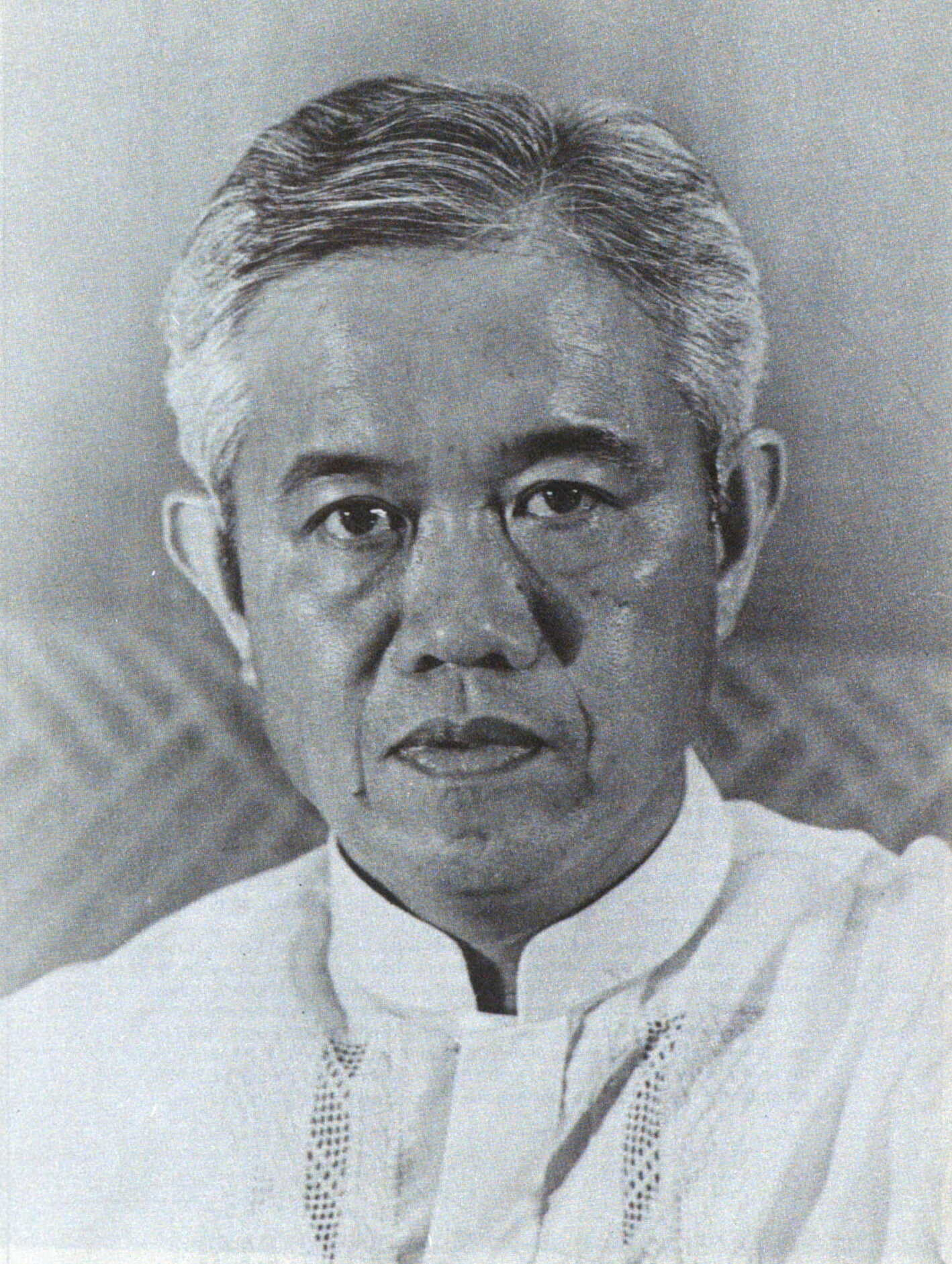
- Virata in 1984

4th Prime Minister of the Philippines
- In office July 28, 1981 (Note: Acting prime minister from June 30, 1981 to July 28, 1981) – February 25, 1986
- President: Ferdinand Marcos
- Deputy: Jose Roño
- Preceded by: Ferdinand Marcos
- Succeeded by: Salvador Laurel

Deputy Prime Minister of the Philippines
- In office June 12, 1978 – June 30, 1981
- President: Ferdinand Marcos
- Prime Minister: Ferdinand Marcos
- Preceded by: Position established
- Succeeded by: Jose Roño

3rd Director-General of the National Economic and Development Authority and Minister of Economic Planning
- In office 1983–1984
- President: Ferdinand Marcos
- Preceded by: Placido Mapa Jr.
- Succeeded by: Vicente Valdepeñas Jr.

Secretary/Minister of Finance
- In office February 9, 1970 – March 3, 1986
- President: Ferdinand Marcos
- Preceded by: Eduardo Romualdez
- Succeeded by: Jaime Ongpin

Member of the Regular Batasang Pambansa
- In office June 30, 1984 – March 25, 1986
- Constituency: Cavite

Member of the Interim Batasang Pambansa
- In office June 12, 1978 – June 5, 1984
- Constituency: Region IV-A

Personal details
- Born: Cesar Enrique Aguinaldo Virata; December 12, 1930 Kawit, Cavite, Philippine Islands
- Died: October 2, 2026 (aged 95)
- Resting place: Baldomero Aguinaldo Shrine, Kawit, Cavite, Philippines
- Party: Independent (1986–2026); KBL (1978–1986)
- Spouse: Phylita Joy Gamboa (m. 1956)
- Relations: Baldomero Aguinaldo (grandfather)
- Children: 3
- Education: University of the Philippines Diliman (BS); University of Pennsylvania (MBA)
- Awards: Grand Cordon, Order of the Rising Sun

Cesar Enrique Aguinaldo Virata KGCR (December 12, 1930 – October 2, 2026) was a Filipino statesman and businessman who served as the fourth and penultimate Prime Minister of the Philippines from 1981 to 1986. Serving concurrently as Secretary of Finance from 1970 to 1986, Virata was the chief economic technocrat during the administration of President Ferdinand Marcos. Prior to his death, he served as the corporate vice chairman of the Rizal Commercial Banking Corporation. He was the eponym of the Cesar E.A. Virata School of Business (VSB), the business school of the University of the Philippines Diliman, a naming designation that has sparked public controversy due to his high-level association with the Marcos martial law regime.

== Early life and education ==
Cesar Enrique Aguinaldo Virata was born on December 12, 1930, in Kawit, Cavite to a family of middle-class landowners. His father was a mathematics professor at the original campus of the University of the Philippines (UP) in Manila, later becoming an acting president for the university.

He studied at the University of the Philippines Diliman, obtaining a Bachelor of Science degree in Mechanical Engineering with honors (cum laude) in 1952. After completing his engineering degree, he taught at the UP College of Business Administration. His status as a UP faculty member linked him to a network of fellowships, enabling him to study at the Wharton School of the University of Pennsylvania in 1953 with support from the Mutual Security Administration (a forerunner to the United States Agency for International Development). He graduated with a Master of Business Administration degree with a concentration in Industrial Management, studying various aspects of business administration, American labor, and the automobile and steel industries. When he returned to the Philippines, he was recruited to the accounting and consulting firm SyCip Gorres Velayo & Co., working full-time until returning to teaching at UP in December 1965, eventually becoming a professor as well as dean at the UP College of Business Administration.

== Government service ==
=== Finance minister ===
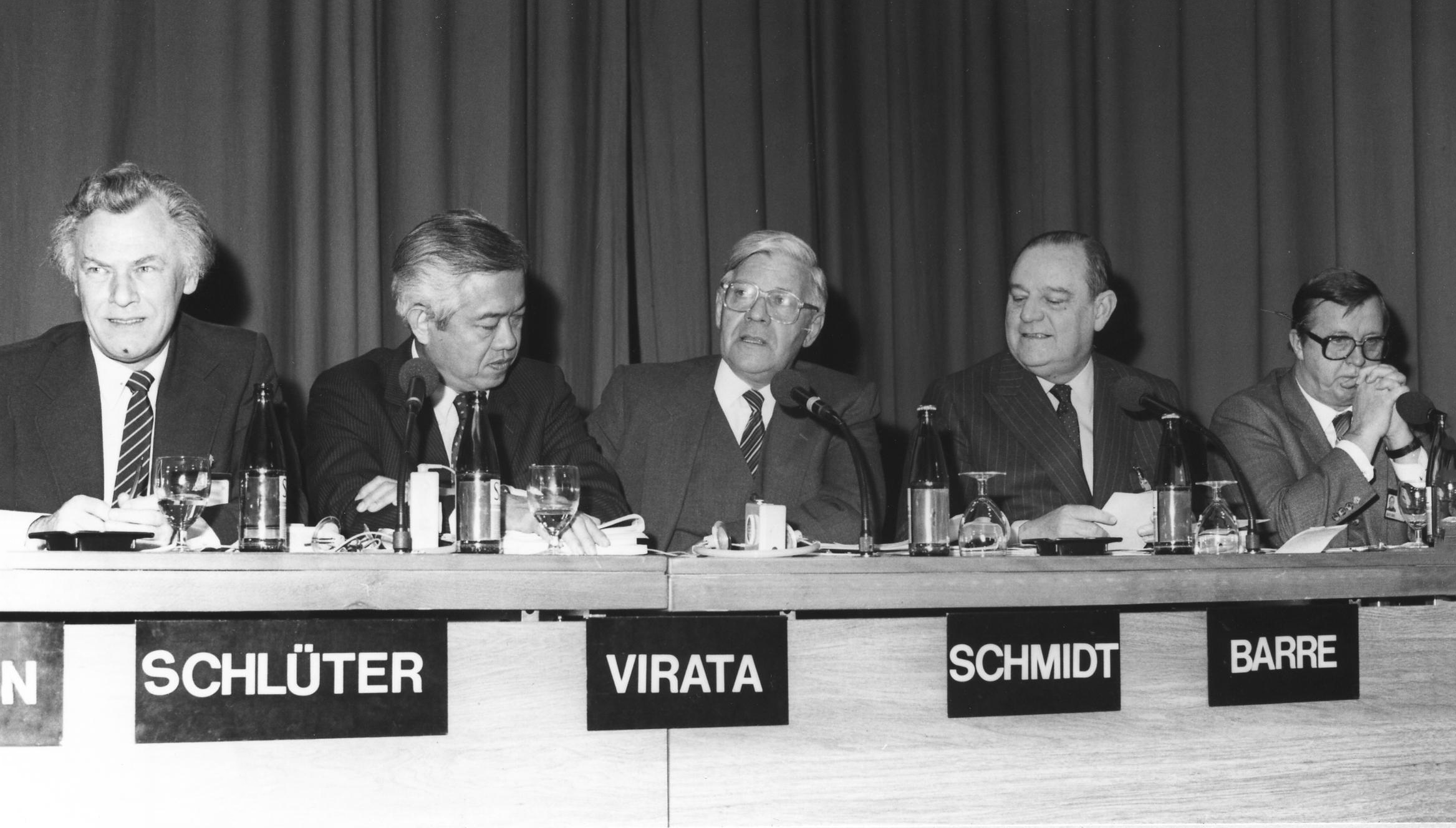
Virata at the World Economic Forum in 1983

Virata served as Finance Minister from 1970 to 1986 under President Ferdinand Marcos.

During his tenure as Finance Minister, he oversaw the national budget and restructured debt. He also established more hydroelectric plants in hopes of making the Philippines less reliant on foreign energy.

=== Prime Minister of the Philippines ===
Prime ministerial styles of Cesar Virata
- Reference style: His Excellency
- Spoken style: Your Excellency

Virata served as Prime Minister of the Philippines from 1981 to 1986 under the Interim Batasang Pambansa and the Regular Batasang Pambansa, concurrently with his position as Finance Minister.

He also headed the National Economic and Development Authority (NEDA), the country's highest economic planning body, while also serving as the prime minister. Virata was the third to occupy the position and was succeeded by economist Vicente Valdepeñas, Jr.

During his term in office, Virata came into conflict with first lady Imelda Marcos and several other Marcos cronies over spending and economic policy, including a request to provide $12 million in government funding for a film festival in Manila in 1982. He was also critical of the government's coconut levy policy and the economic monopolies held by Marcos cronies such as Danding Cojuangco and Roberto Benedicto.

=== After the 1986 EDSA Revolution ===
Virata was replaced as prime minister in the aftermath of the 1986 People Power Revolution by Salvador Laurel. Laurel succeeded Virata as prime minister on February 25, 1986, through the appointment of Corazon Aquino, but the position was abolished a month later by Proclamation No. 3 (the 'Freedom Constitution'). The office was confirmed as superseded by the 1987 Constitution, which again fused the offices of the head of state and the head of government in the President.

He defended his role in Marcos's government, saying that he sought to prevent the economy from collapsing further.

Virata became a trustee of the Makati Business Club from 1990 to 2003.

== Academe ==
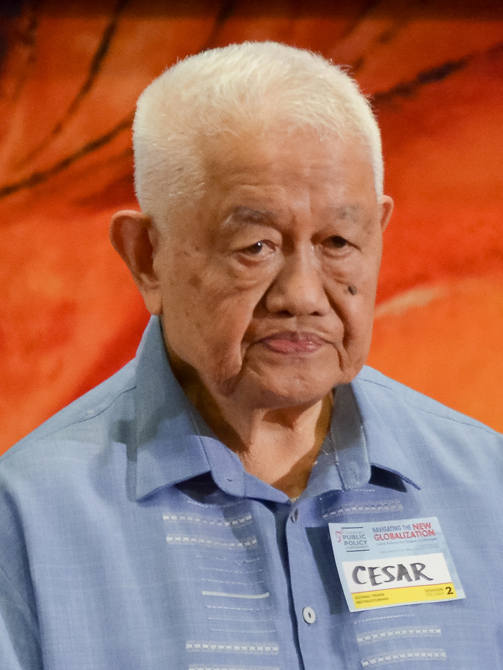
Virata in 2019

Prior to assuming leadership positions in the government service during the Marcos administration, Virata taught at the business school of the University of the Philippines Diliman. He served as dean of the College of Business Administration, which was named after him on April 12, 2013, by the University of the Philippines Board of Regents (BOR) as the Cesar E.A. Virata School of Business. This decision was driven by a commitment from businessman and UP alumnus Magdaleno Albarracin, who pledged to donate ₱40 million to the university, conditioned upon the board's approval to rename the college after Virata.

The renaming sparked protests from several sectors within the UP community, including faculty, U.P. Kilos Na and UP School of Business Student Council. The objectors argued against honoring Virata, with many citing his role as a top-ranking official and enabler of the Marcos dictatorship, a regime marked by widespread human rights abuses and economic plunder. Critics also questioned the ethics of allowing a private financial donation to influence the naming of a public academic institution. Because of this intense backlash, the BOR decided to restudy its decision during its board meeting held on July 29, 2013. The matter was discussed at length in a series of meetings which resulted in the BOR re-affirming its decision to rename the college after Virata.

== Personal life ==
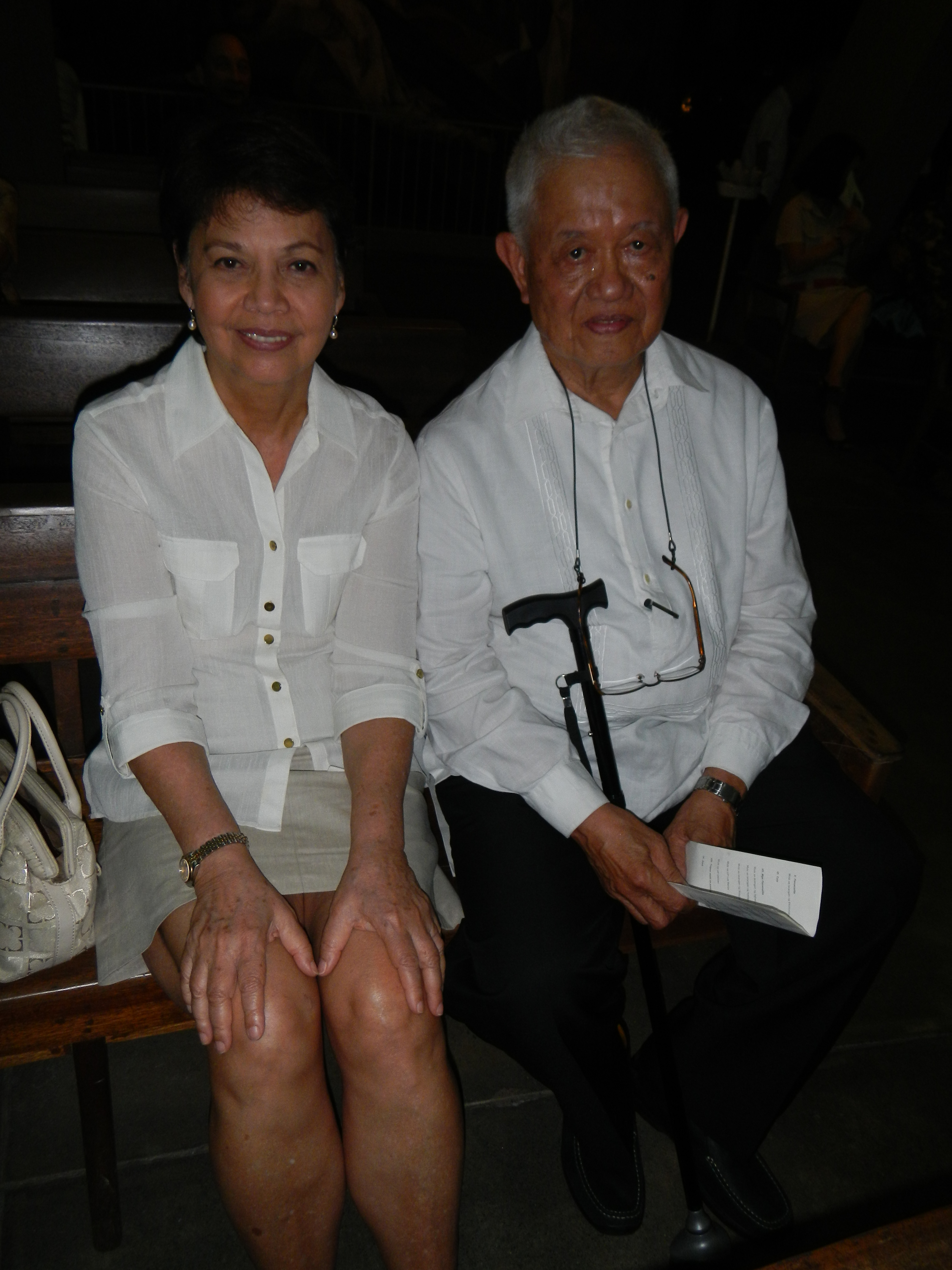
Cesar Virata and wife Phylita "Joy" Gamboa Virata at the eulogy for Onofre Corpuz, April 1, 2013.

Virata was married to Phylita Joy Gamboa, a stage actress and theater director. Together, they had three children: Steven Cesar, a businessman; Gillian Joyce, an educator; and Michael Dean, a physician specializing in infectious disease. Virata was a grandnephew of the first president of the Philippines, Emilio Aguinaldo, and half-nephew to Leonides Sarao Virata, who also served under the Marcos regime as Secretary of Trade and Industry and chairman of the Development Bank of the Philippines. Outside of his professional life, Virata was known to be an accomplished tennis player and a member of the Philippine Independent Church.

Virata died on October 2, 2026, at the age of 95. His death was announced by the RCBC with whom he served in its executive management from 1995.

== Biographies ==
Virata's life and his impact on Philippine economic history have been the subject of various books. The most of extensive biography to cover Virata as its main subject is Gerardo Sicat's biography, Cesar Virata: Life and Times Through Four Decades of Philippine Economic History (2014). Sicat was a top economist during the Marcos dictatorship and a close associate of Virata. He is also one of the main subjects of Teresa S. Encarnacion Tadem's Ateneo Press book Philippine Politics and the Marcos Technocrats: The Emergence and Evolution of a Power Elite (2019).

== Honors ==
- Knight Grand Cross of Rizal (KGCR)
- Grand Cordon of the Order of the Rising Sun (2016)
- Most Distinguished Brother, Pan Xenia International Professional Foreign Trade Fraternity

== See also ==
- Prime Minister of the Philippines
- National Economic and Development Authority (Prime Minister was also the head of the NEDA)
- Gerardo P. Sicat, 2014. Cesar Virata Life and Times Through Four Decades of Philippine Economic History, Diliman, Quezon City: The University of Philippines Press, ISBN 978-971-542-742-5.

Political offices
Preceded by Ferdinand Marcos	Prime Minister of the Philippines; 1981–1986	Succeeded by Salvador Laurel
Preceded by Eduardo Romualdez	Secretary of Finance; 1970–1986	Succeeded by Jaime Ongpin
House of Representatives of the Philippines
New constituency	Member of Parliament for Cavite; 1984–1986	Constituency abolished
Political offices
Preceded by Gerardo Sicat	Head of the National Economic and Development Authority; 1981–1986	Succeeded by Solita Monsod
