= Winnie Monsod =

Filipino economist and broadcaster

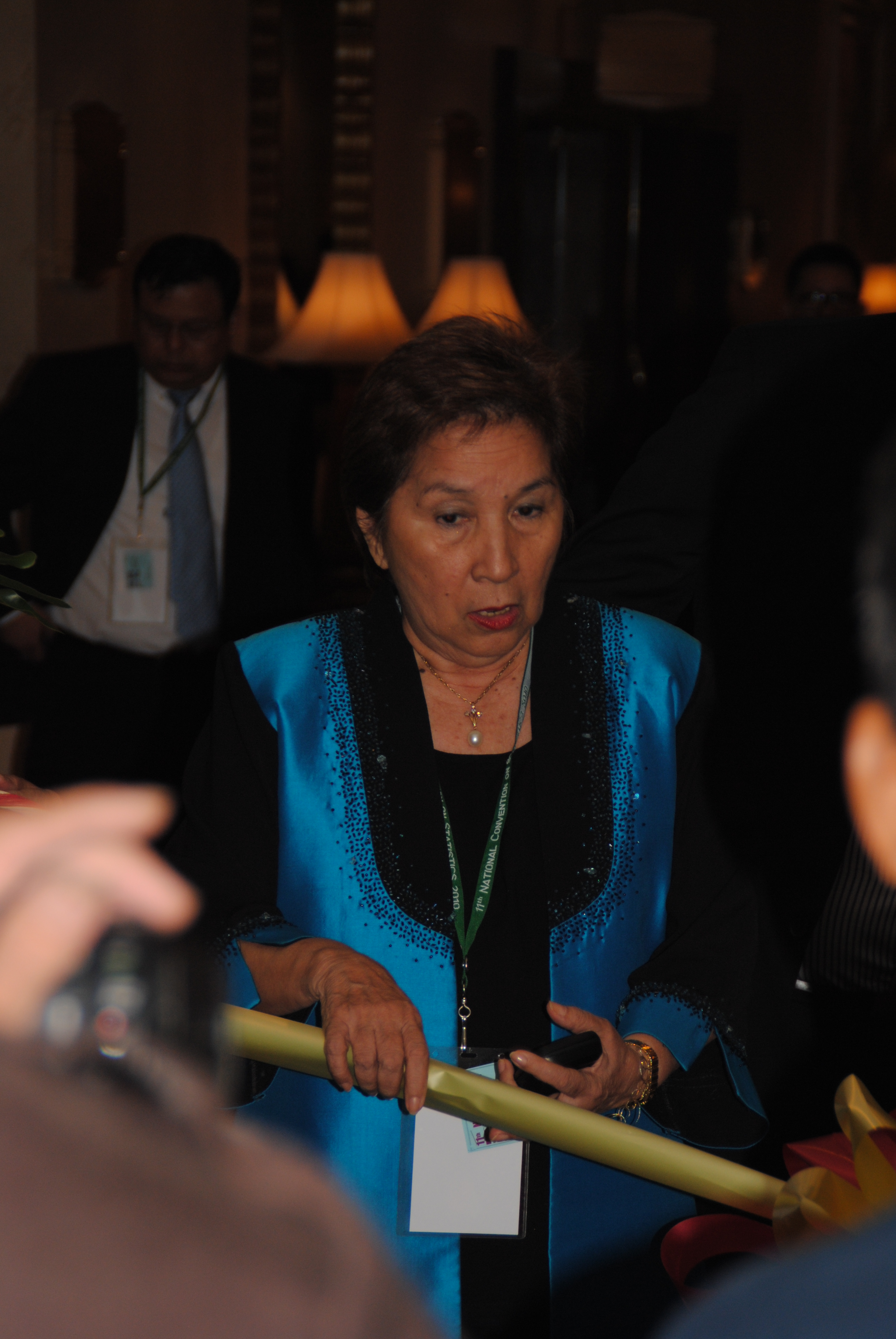

5th Director General of the National Economic Development Authority Concurrently Minister of Economic Planning
- In office July 22, 1987 – 1989
- President: Corazon Aquino
- Preceded by: Vicente Valdepeñas Jr.
- Succeeded by: Jesus Estanislao

Personal details
- Born: Solita Garduño Collás; 29 July 1940 (age 86) Manila, Commonwealth of the Philippines
- Party: Aksyon Demokratiko
- Spouse: Christian Monsod
- Children: 5
- Education: University of the Philippines Diliman (BA); University of Pennsylvania (MA)
- Occupation: Economist; professor; TV host; columnist; broadcaster
- Known for: Television host and economist

Solita Garduño Collás-Monsod (born July 29, 1940), popularly known as Mareng Winnie, is a Filipino economist, broadcaster, columnist, radio host, and public intellectual. She had been the 5th Director-General of the National Economic and Development Authority and concurrently socio-economic planning secretary of the Philippines from 1986 to 1989.

Educated at the Wharton School of the University of Pennsylvania, she holds the rank of Professor Emerita at the University of the Philippines School of Economics.

== Education ==
Monsod graduated with a Bachelor of Arts degree in economics, cum laude at the University of the Philippines Diliman in 1959 and is a member of the Sigma Delta Phi Sorority. She obtained a Master of Arts in economics from the University of Pennsylvania in 1962.

== Academic career ==
Monsod has been teaching in the UP School of Economics of the University of the Philippines Diliman since 1963. In 2005, she was nominated to be the President of the University of the Philippines System, an office tasked with the management of all UP campuses nationwide.

In October 2010, a video of Monsod's last lecture in Economics 100.1 (Introduction to Macroeconomics) became a viral hit online. In her impromptu remarks, she said: "You're going to be as good and as honorable as you should be. You are going to stay in the Philippines. And if you leave the Philippines, you are at least going to try to pay back. And if you don't do any of the above, this is my last threat to you. Mrs. Monsod is going to haunt you! From the grave! I intend to go up there and from up there I'm going to look down on you and I am going to confront you at the worst possible moments in your life."

Winnie Monsod was a member of the UN Committee for Development Planning (UNCDP) from 1987 to 2000 and the Board of Trustees of the International Food Policy Research Institute (IFPRI) in January 1996. She was also a member of the Board of Advisors of Human Development Report on 1993 and the Board of Advisors of South Centre, which was established to follow up the recommendations of the South Commission, organized in 1987 at the initiative of Prime Minister Mahathir Mohamad of Malaysia and chaired by Mwalimu Julius Nyerere of Tanzania, from 1991 to 1995. The Commission issued a report in 1990 entitled The Challenge of the South, which has since been translated in five languages.

== Political career ==
Professor Monsod is best remembered for her role as the Minister of Economic Planning, and later Secretary of Socio-economic Planning and concurrent Director of the National Economic and Development Authority (NEDA) from 1986 to 1989, during the term of President Corazon Aquino.

Monsod ran for the Senate of the Philippines under the administration party of President Gloria Macapagal Arroyo, People Power Coalition in the 2001 national elections but lost.

== Media career ==
Monsod debuted in Mareng Winnie, a segment of Saksi and she was also co-host in Debate with Mare at Pare with former Pangasinan Governor and 1998 vice presidential candidate Oscar Orbos. Monsod co-hosted the now defunct show Palaban with investigative journalist Malou Mangahas and former beauty queen Miriam Quiambao. She also hosted the weekly segment Analysis in the news program News on Q, aired on Q. She wrote her weekly column "Get Real" in the Philippine Daily Inquirer (PDI) for two decades and was discontinued by the PDI management on July 1, 2022.

She is currently hosting a show entitled Bawal ang Pasaway kay Mareng Winnie on GMA News TV, is a part of Rappler's Board of Directors for 2018 and a segment host of Unang Hirit's Hirit ni Mareng Winnie.

== Awards ==
Monsod is a recipient of numerous awards for her achievements in teaching, broadcasting and government service.

- Lifetime Achievement Award for Television, 2014. Pete Roa Integrated Media Endeavors (PRIME) TV Awards.
- Outstanding Public Affairs Host, 2011. Golden Screen TV Awards.
- Inspiring Women of the Year Award, 2010. Go Negosyo and the Philippine Commission on Women.
- Outstanding Alumna Award, 2005. University of the Philippines Alumni Association.
- Broadcaster of the Year, 2000. Award presented by KBP.
- Best TV Program Host, Public Affairs Program. Award presented by Star Awards.
- Best Public Affairs Program, 2000. Award presented by Catholic Mass Media Awards.
- Best TV Program Host, Public Affairs Program, 1999. Award presented by Star Awards.
- Woman of Distinction, 1995. Award presented by Soroptimist International Makati.
- Woman of the Year, 1988. Award presented by Perspectives, publication of the Catholic Educators Association of the Philippines.
- Cabinet Secretary of the Year, 1988 and 1999. Award presented by the Philippine Free Press.
- Professional Award in Economics, 1987. Award presented by the University of the Philippines Alumni Association.
- Mariang Maya Award. Presented by the Sigma Delta Phi Alumnae Association, University of the Philippines.

Year	Award giving body	Category	Nominated work	Results
2000	PMPC Star Awards for Television	Best Public Affairs Program Host (shared with Oscar Orbos)	Debate with Mare & Pare	Won

== Personal life ==
Monsod is married to Christian Monsod, a corporate executive and one-time Chairman of the Philippine Commission on Elections. They had Ferdinand Marcos as their godfather in their marriage. She was a former Protestant, but converted to Catholicism before marrying to her husband. They have five children holding different careers.

Preceded by Cesar Virata (as Prime Minister and concurrent head of NEDA)	Director-General of the National Economic and Development Authority; 1986 – 1989	Succeeded by Jesus Estanislao
