= National Bureau of Investigation (Philippines) =

Agency of the Philippine government

- Pambansang Kawanihan ng Pagsisiyasat
- Seal

Agency overview
- Formed: November 13, 1936; 89 years ago
- Preceding agency: Division of Investigation
- Jurisdiction: Government of the Philippines
- Headquarters: Diosdado Macapagal Boulevard, Filinvest Cyberzone Bay City, Pasay, Philippines
- Motto: Nobility; Bravery; Integrity; Efficient law enforcement in the pursuit of truth and justice
- Employees: 1,385 (2024)
- Annual budget: ₱2.77 billion (2023)
- Agency executive: Atty. Melvin Matibag, Director
- Parent agency: Department of Justice
- Website: nbi.gov.ph

The National Bureau of Investigation (NBI; Filipino: Pambansang Kawanihan ng Pagsisiyasat) is an agency of the Philippine government under the Department of Justice, responsible for handling and solving major high-profile cases that are in the interest of the nation.

The NBI was modelled after the United States' Federal Bureau of Investigation (FBI) when it was being established.

== History ==
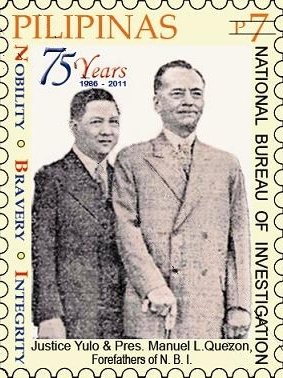
José Yulo and Manuel L. Quezon, the forefathers of the National Bureau of Investigation, on a 2011 stamp of the Philippines

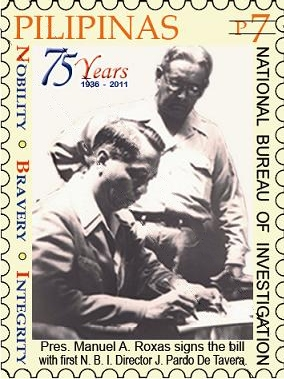
Signing of an order creating the NBI with President Manuel Roxas and first NBI Director J. Pardo De Tavera

The Division of Investigation (DI), subsequently reconstituted as the National Bureau of Investigation, was formally established on 19 June 1947 pursuant to the enactment of Republic Act No. 157. Its institutional antecedents, however, may be traced to 13 November 1936, when the DI was originally created under the auspices of the Department of Justice through the passage of Commonwealth Act No. 181 by the First National Assembly. First National Assembly. Section 1, C.A. No. 181 provides:

A Division of Investigation under the Department of Justice is hereby created. It shall be composed of such personnel as may be necessary, in the discretion of the Secretary of Justice, and its duties shall be to help in the detection and prosecution of crimes; to acquire, collect, classify and preserve criminal identification records; and to obtain information on all matters affecting the public interest.

The DI was the brainchild of Commonwealth President Manuel L. Quezon and the then–Secretary of Justice José Yulo. A veteran American police officer, Capt. Thomas Duggan of the New York Police Department (NYPD), and the only Filipino member of the United States Federal Bureau of Investigation (FBI), Flaviano Guerrero, were hired by the Philippine government to organize the Division of Investigation of the Department of Justice.

The formation of the DI generated considerable public interest and more than 3,000 applied for the initial 48 positions of NBI Agents. Physical and medical examinations were conducted by doctors from the Philippine General Hospital and San Lazaro Hospital. Of the 3,000 applicants, only 150 were allowed to take the mental test and, of this number, less than 100 passed. After further screening, 48 were certified for employment and of these successful candidates, only 45 actually accepted appointments as Agents.

The Division of Investigation (DI) was thereafter formally organized in 1937, comprising forty-five (45) agents and approximately one hundred (100) officials and employees. This complement included lawyers, physicians, chemists, fingerprint technicians, photographers, research assistants, clerks, stenographers, janitors, and messengers.

The DI maintained its principal office in Manila, from which its agents and technical personnel were periodically dispatched to the provinces to conduct investigations involving matters of public interest or whenever exigencies so required.

The DI operation was suspended upon the surrender of the Commonwealth Government to the occupying Japanese forces during World War II. The Japanese, however, revived the DI and allowed it to function as a division under the Department of Justice until the establishment of the Japanese puppet Philippine Republic of President José P. Laurel. During the Laurel administration, the DI was merged with the Secret Service Division of the Metropolitan Constabulary (Manila Police Department or MPD) and the Intelligence Unit of the Japanese-run Philippine Constabulary.

Upon the liberation of the Philippines by combined Filipino and American forces in 1945, the DI was not immediately reorganized since most of its original members were seconded in the service of the United States Army Counterintelligence Corps (CIC). After the surrender of Japan in August 1945, the DI was reactivated and the original members were called back to the service. The reactivated DI started with no records or equipment, most of which had been systematically destroyed by DI personnel for security reasons in order to prevent classified documents and equipment from falling into the hands of the Japanese.

In 1947, during the post-war recovery period of the Philippines, a marked escalation in criminal activity was observed across multiple categories. This surge significantly strained the limited operational capacity and logistical resources of the recently reorganized police service, thereby impairing its effectiveness in addressing sophisticated organized crime syndicates and resolving complex criminal cases.

In response to the deteriorating law and order situation, personnel assigned to the Division of Investigation (DI) formally advocated for its elevation to bureau status. This proposal was predicated on the operational necessity for a larger, more specialized, and adequately resourced investigative body. The envisioned structure was to be modeled after the Federal Bureau of Investigation, with the objective of enhancing institutional capability in combating organized criminal enterprises and conducting high-level investigative operations involving crimes of a complex and technical nature.

In response, Congress filed House Bill No. 1162, from which Republic Act No. 157 originated. R.A. 157 was approved by Congress and enacted into law on June 19, 1947, which renamed DI to the Bureau of Investigation (BI). On October 4, 1947, R.A. 157 was amended by Executive Order No. 94 to change the name from BI to the National Bureau of Investigation.

On June 12, 2023, Medardo de Lemos' term as NBI Director was extended.

In 2019, NBI's original headquarters on Taft Avenue was declared by Manila LGU as condemned property.

In March 2024, Filinvest Cyberparks, Inc. of Filinvest Land, Inc. leased for NBI's Main Office the four-building mixed-use development Filinvest Cyberzone Bay City, occupying nine floors (3rd-9th floors, Building C and 8th-9th floors, Building D). In November 2024, it relocated its temporary headquarters from VTech Tower, Gregorio Araneta Avenue corner Maria Clara street to Diosdado Macapagal Boulevard, Filinvest Cyberzone Bay City, Pasay.

In April 2026, the NBI established the Chemical, Biological, Radiological, Nuclear, and Explosives and Foreign Malign Influence Unit (CFMIU), created through Administrative Order No. 09, series of 2026. The CFMIU operates under the Office of the Director and is tasked to tackle cases involving hazardous substances, explosives and foreign influence.

== Mandate ==
The NBI is mandated to investigate/take on the following cases:

1. Extrajudicial/extra-legal killings by state security forces against media practitioners/activists.
2. Murders of justices and judges
3. Violations of the Cybercrime Prevention Act of 2012 (Republic Act No. 10175)
4. Cases from the Inter-Agency Anti-Graft Coordinating Council
5. Anti-Dummy Law cases
6. Human trafficking cases in all Philippine airports
7. Cases involving threats to security or assaults against the persons of the President, Vice President, Senate President, Speaker of the House of Representatives, and Chief Justice of the Supreme Court
8. Transnational crimes based on international agreements
9. Identification of victims of natural disasters
10. Violations of:
- the E-Commerce Act of 2000 (Republic Ac No. 8792);
- the Access Devices Regulations Act of 1998 (Republic Act No. 8484);
- the Intellectual Property Code of the Philippines (Republic Act No. 8293);
- the Securities Regulation Code (Republic Act No. 8799);
- the Decree Increasing the Penalty for Certain Forms of Estafa (Presidential Decree No. 1689)

== Organization ==
Organizational structure

The National Bureau of Investigation is a line agency under the Department of Justice and serves as the premier investigative agency of government. The agency director is a Presidential appointee and serves under the trust and confidence of the President and the Secretary of Justice (SOJ).

Each of the seven assistant directors lead a different service within the bureau. Those services are as follows:

- Investigation Service
- Intelligence Service
- Comptroller Service
- Human Resource and Management Service
- Forensic and Scientific Research Service
- Legal Service
- Information and Communications Technology Service

Positions within the Bureau

On 23 June 2016, Republic Act No. 10867, also known as the "National Bureau of Investigation Reorganization and Modernization Act", was signed by President Aquino. The law provided new titles for the positions within the bureau. They are as follows:

- Director
- Deputy Director
- Assistant Director
- Regional Director
- Assistant Regional Director
- Head Agent
- Supervising Agent
- Senior Agent
- Investigation Agent III

The following were the old ranks observed prior to 2016:

- Director VI
- Director V (assistant director)
- Director III (deputy director)
- Director II (Regional Director)
- Director I (Assistant Regional Director)
- Investigation Agent VI (Head Agent)
- Investigation Agent V (Supervising Agent)
- Investigation Agent IV (Senior Agent)
- Investigation Agent III
- Investigation Agent II
- Investigation Agent I
- Special Investigator V
- Special Investigator IV
- Special Investigator III

== NBI Directors ==
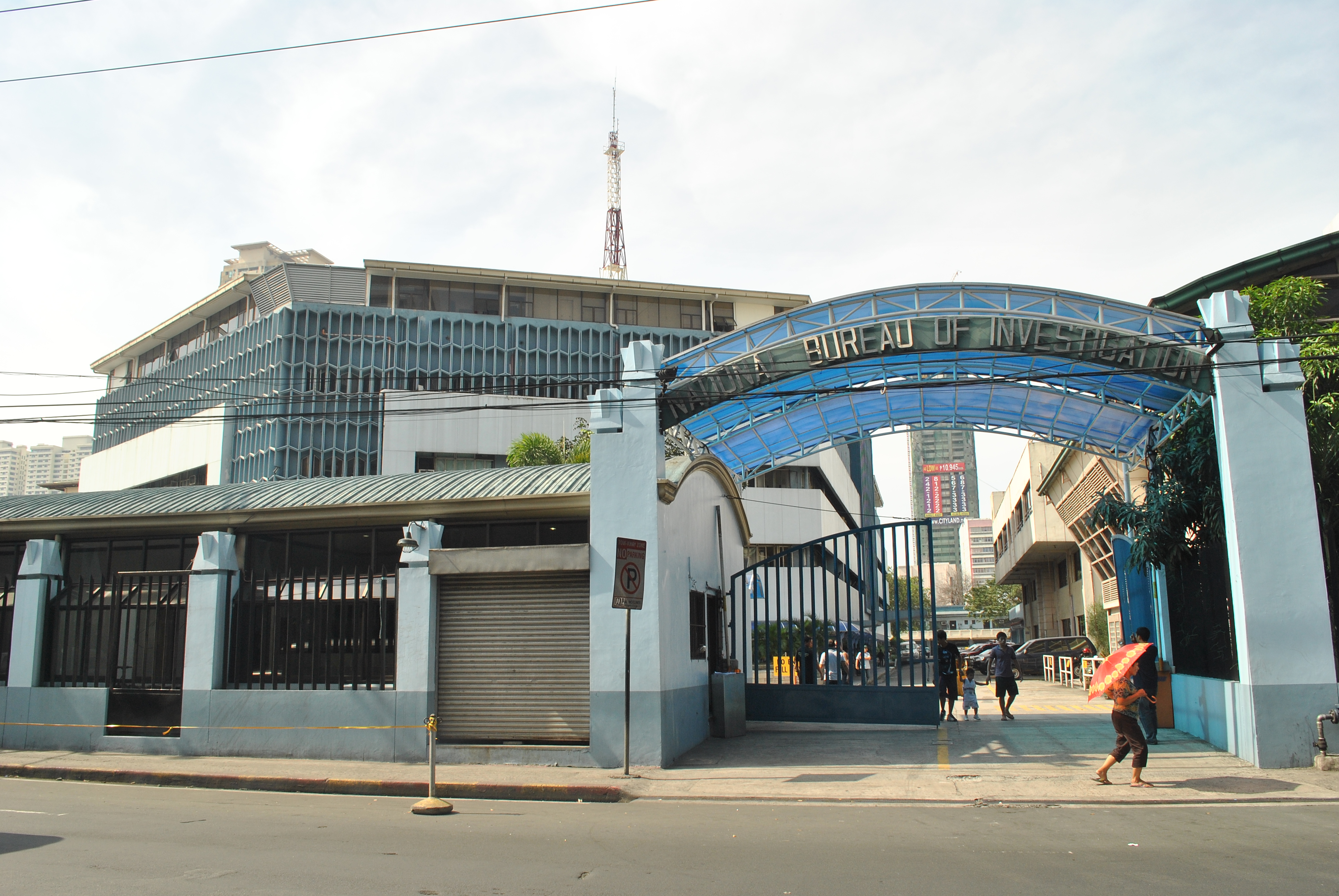
NBI main office at Taft Avenue, Manila

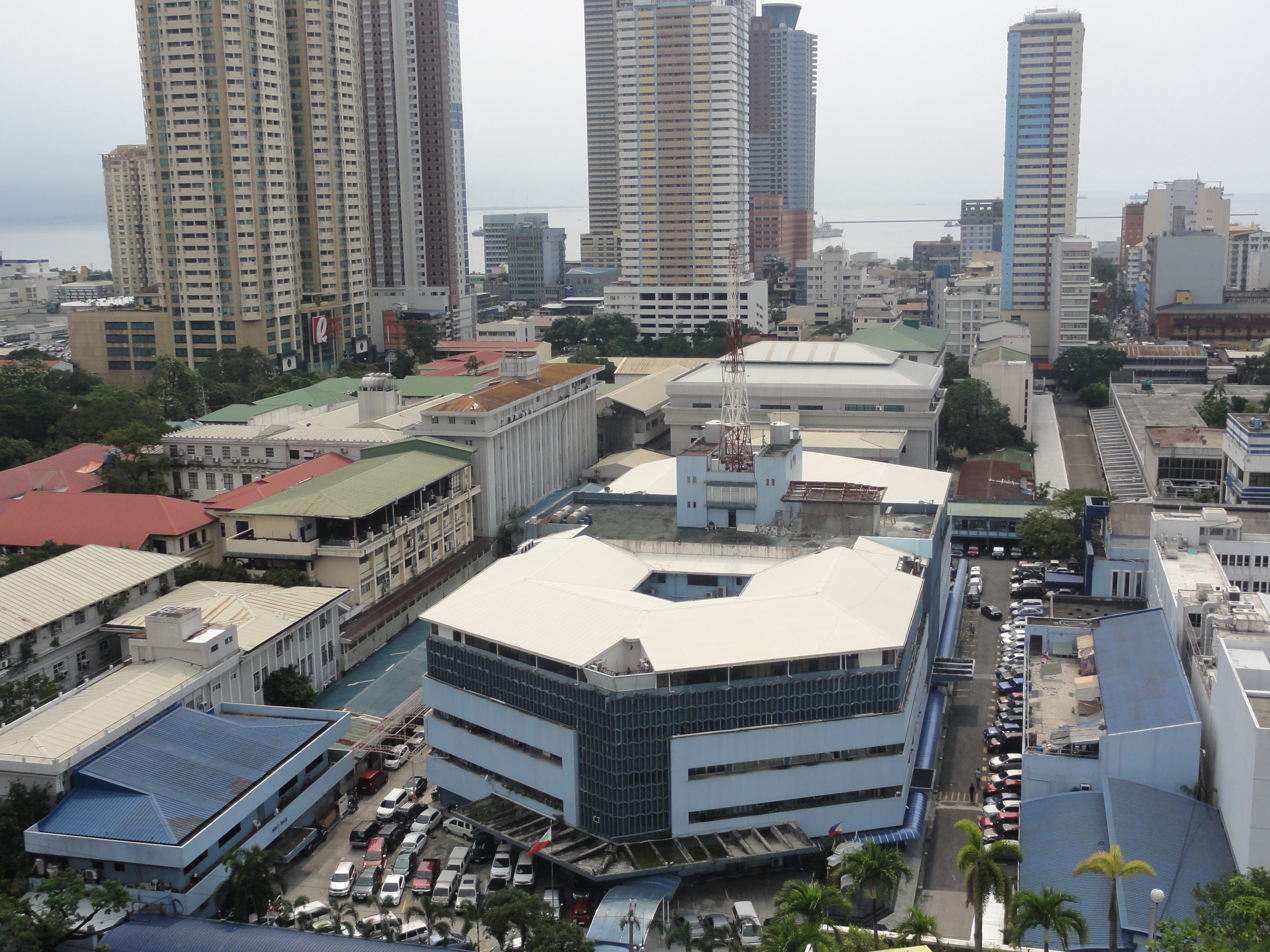
NBI compound in Ermita

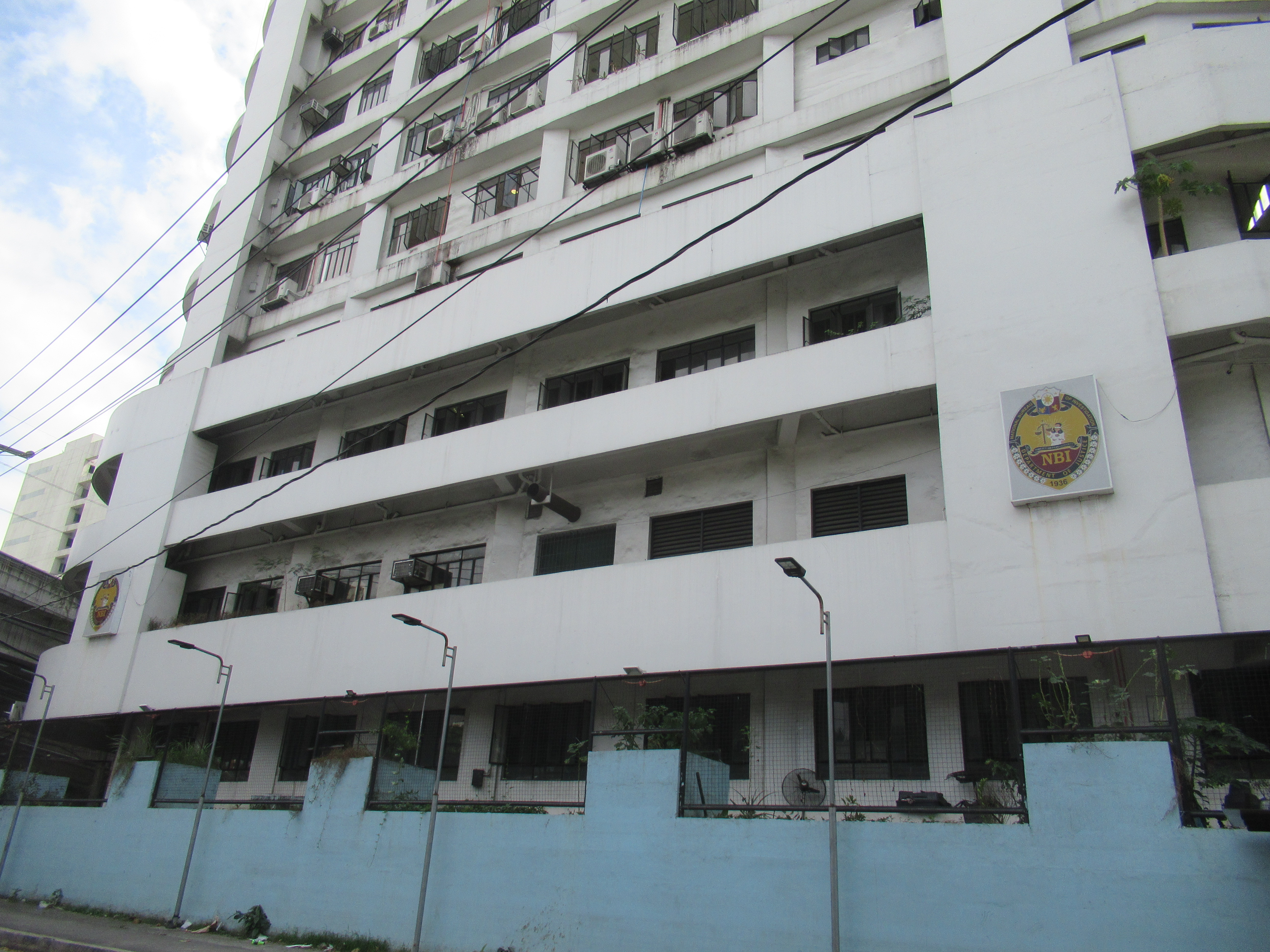
NBI V-Tech Tower (G. Araneta Avenue corner Maria Clara Street)

Since its establishment, directors and officers in charge either retired, were replaced, or were deceased. The first director in its history to have been successfully extended is Medardo G. de Lemos. The position of a director was deemed confidential and coterminous with the appointing authority. As a result, his term and appointment appeared to be extended despite having reached the compulsory retirement age of 65 years old.

The heads of the NBI since the founding on November 13, 1936, were:

Years covered	Portrait	Director	Notes	Appointing president
1936–1939		Capt. Thomas Duggan	Former Police Officer, NYPD, Head of the Division of Investigation during its formative years	Manuel L. Quezon
1939–1941		Joaquin Pardo de Tavera		Manuel L. Quezon
1941–1945	None		Japanese occupation	
1946–1950		Joaquin Pardo de Tavera	First Director of the newly renamed and reorganized National Bureau of Investigation	Sergio Osmeña
1946–1950		Joaquin Pardo de Tavera	First Director of the newly renamed and reorganized National Bureau of Investigation	Manuel Roxas
1946–1950		Joaquin Pardo de Tavera	First Director of the newly renamed and reorganized National Bureau of Investigation	Elpidio Quirino
1951–1954		Gen. Alberto Ramos		Elpidio Quirino
1954		Maj. Jose Crisol		Elpidio Quirino
1954		Col. Leoncio Tan		Elpidio Quirino
1954–1966		Col. Jose Lukban		Elpidio Quirino
1954–1966		Col. Jose Lukban		Ramon Magsaysay
1954–1966		Col. Jose Lukban		Carlos P. Garcia
1954–1966		Col. Jose Lukban		Diosdado Macapagal
1954–1966		Col. Jose Lukban		Ferdinand Marcos
1966		Serafin Fausto	Officer in Charge	Ferdinand Marcos
1967–1986		Jolly Bugarin		Ferdinand Marcos
1986–1989		Jesus Antonio Carpio		Corazon Aquino
1989–1992		MGen. Alfredo S. Lim		Corazon Aquino
1992–1995		Epimaco Velasco		Fidel V. Ramos
1995		Antonio Aragon	Aragon's tenure lasted five days before he died of a heart attack.	Fidel V. Ramos
1995–1996		Mariano Mison		Fidel V. Ramos
1996–1999		Santiago Toledo		Fidel V. Ramos
1999–2000		Federico Opinion		Joseph Estrada
2000–2001		Carlos Caabay	Officer in Charge	Joseph Estrada
2001–2005		Gen. Reynaldo Wycoco	Not a lawyer. Suffered stroke in November 2005, and died in office in December 2005.	Gloria Macapagal Arroyo
2005–2010		Nestor Manrique Mantaring		Gloria Macapagal Arroyo
2010–2012		Magtanggol Gatdula		Benigno Aquino III
2012–2013		Nonnatus Caesar Rojas		Benigno Aquino III
2013–2014		Medardo de Lemos	Officer in Charge	Benigno Aquino III
2014–2016		Virgilio L. Mendez		Benigno Aquino III
2016–2020		Dante Gierran		Rodrigo Duterte
2020–2022		Eric B. Distor	Officer in Charge	Rodrigo Duterte
2022–2024		Medardo de Lemos		Bongbong Marcos
2024–2025		Judge Jaime Santiago (Ret.)		Bongbong Marcos
2025–2026		Angelito Magno		Bongbong Marcos
2026–present		Melvin Matibag		Bongbong Marcos
