= Presidency of Bongbong Marcos =

Philippine presidential administration since 2022

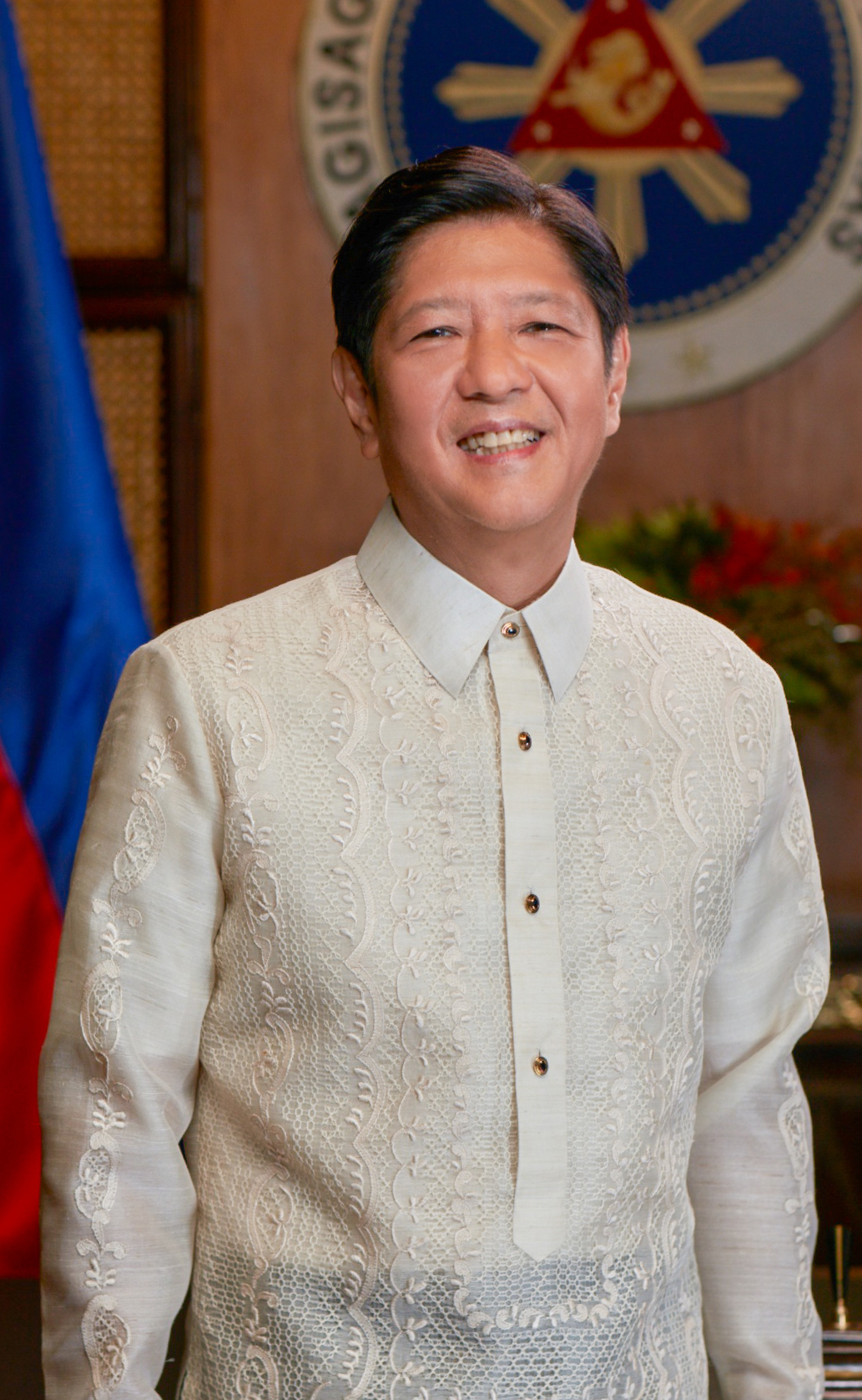
- Official portrait, 2022
- Presidency of Bongbong Marcos; June 30, 2022 – present
- President: Ferdinand R. Marcos Jr.
- Vice President: Sara Duterte
- Cabinet: Cabinet of Bongbong Marcos
- Party: Partido Federal ng Pilipinas
- Election: 2022
- Seat: Malacañang Palace
- Seal of the President

Bongbong Marcos began his presidency at noon on June 30, 2022, following his inauguration as the 17th president of the Philippines, succeeding Rodrigo Duterte. His term is expected to expire six years later, on June 30, 2028.

Marcos initially downsized government bureaucracy, especially in the executive branch of the government. His administration oversaw the post-pandemic return to normalcy with the gradual reopening of the economy, return of face-to-face/physical classes, removal of stringent travel restrictions, and the lifting of the mask-wearing mandate for outdoor and indoor settings. He also sought to address the rising inflation and shortage of the country's food supply during the beginning of his presidency.

As president, Marcos signed into law the creation of the Maharlika Investment Fund, the first sovereign wealth fund of the Philippines. Under his term, the Philippines ratified the RCEP in February, and entered into force in June 2023. Marcos also went on many foreign trips in hopes to attract more foreign investments in the country. During his term, many Filipinos said they felt unsafe on streets, and the country's drug problem has increased. By the first quarter of 2024, Marcos' performance and trust ratings had dropped significantly, marking an erosion of public trust in him and his administration.

Tensions in the South China Sea rose during his administration, with more clashes between the Philippine forces and the Chinese Navy and Coast Guard.

As the son of 10th president Ferdinand Marcos (who was in power from 1965 to 1986), Bongbong Marcos's presidential candidacy has been controversial, receiving criticism from several groups due to his father's regime—a period characterized by violence and oppression against those opposed to his regime, political turmoil, and widespread corruption. Some scholars have noted that his campaign was driven by a massive misinformation campaign aimed at revamping the Marcos brand and smearing his rivals; Marcos has stated he won't engage in negative and hateful campaigning and has repeatedly declined joining debates that may lead to such.

In less than two years as president, more Filipinos have become dissatisfied with the administration of Bongbong Marcos, according to the survey conducted by Publicus Asia from November 29 to December 4, 2023. Economic concerns, rising inflation, joblessness, low wages, and a perceived lack of productivity are some of the emerging factors behind the drop in pro-administration support. The survey also noted that the "Duterte effect" still persists, with opposition parties grappling with the discreditation of the previous administration. In 2024, Marcos banned Philippine offshore gaming operators that had proliferated under the previous administration, while Vice President Sara Duterte resigned from his cabinet amidst a growing rift in the Marcos and Duterte political families. The year 2025 was marked by the impeachment of vice president Sara Duterte in February 5 by the House of Representatives while former president Rodrigo Duterte was arrested in March 11 and handed over to the International Criminal Court, leading to the collapse of the Marcos-Duterte alliance; while subsequently the arrest and hand-over of the latter was severely lambasted, as well as massively criticized and condemned by former Duterte administration officials and allies, and by the Duterte's supporters, which led to a massive protests in support and in solidarity of former president Rodrigo Duterte, and the uncovering of the massive infrastructure corruption scandal that Marcos initially publicized and denounced that have led to a series of massive demonstrations and large protests in condemnation of the ongoing massive corruption scandal.

== Election, transition, and inauguration ==
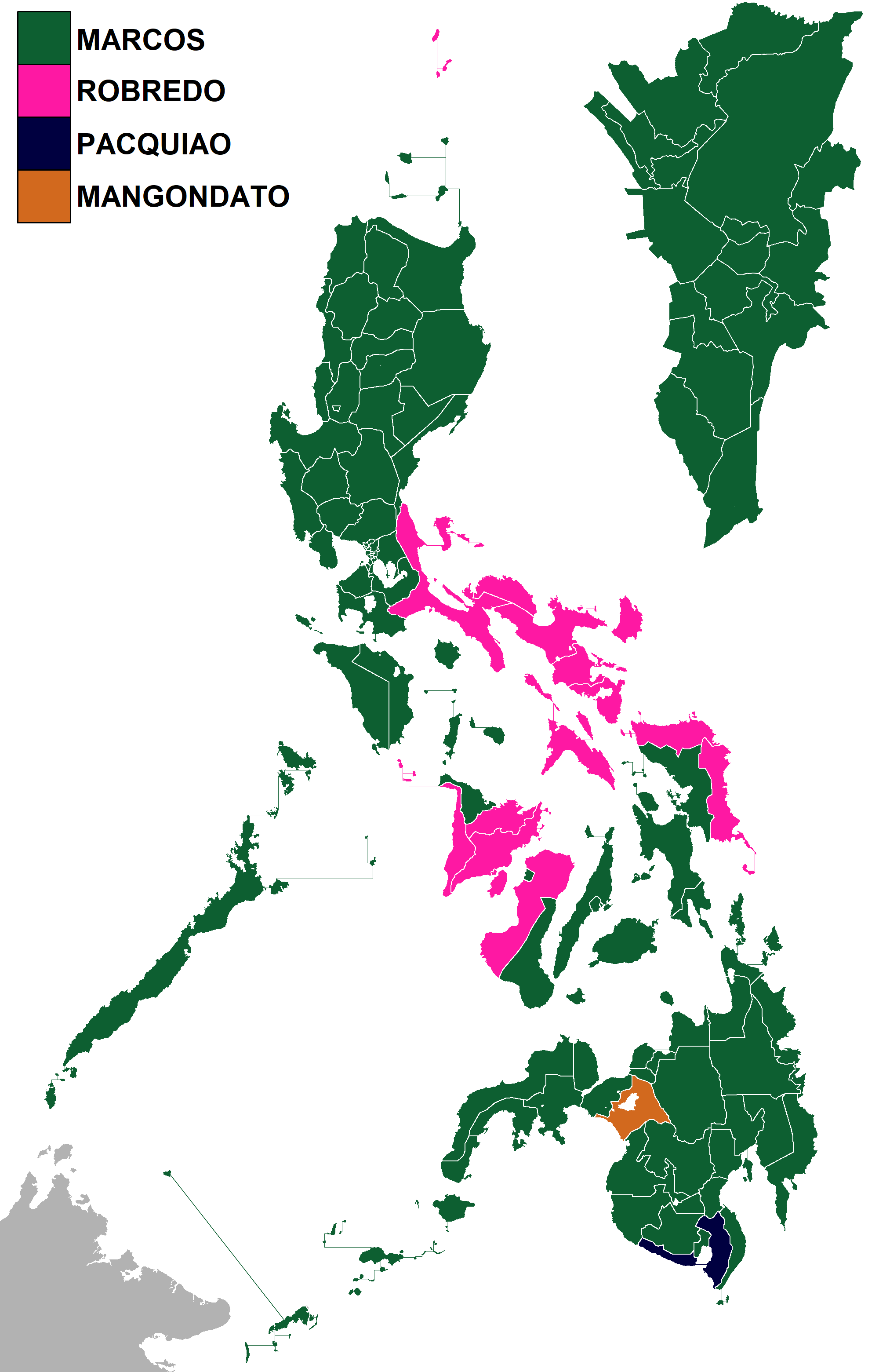
Marcos earned most votes in 64 out of 81 provinces in the 2022 presidential election

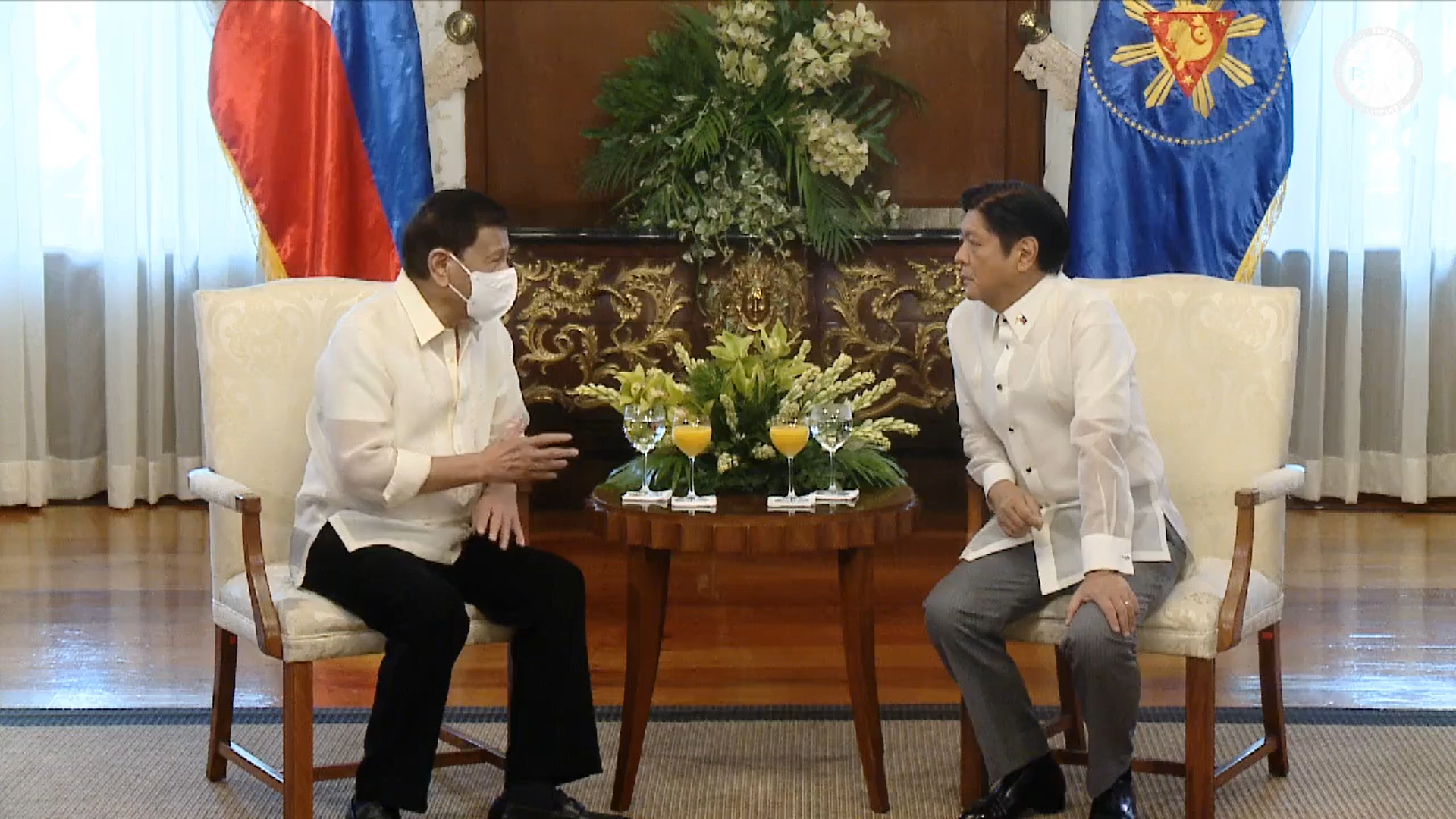
President-elect Bongbong Marcos (right) and outgoing President Rodrigo Duterte on June 30, 2022.

Marcos ran for president on a campaign platform centered on national unity and continuity of the policies of Rodrigo Duterte, his predecessor. He won the 2022 elections, receiving 31,629,783 (58.77%) votes out of a total of 56,097,722, beating his closest rival, Liberal Party member and Vice President Leni Robredo by over 15 million votes.

Marcos became the first candidate in the history of the Fifth Republic to win by a majority, scoring nearly 59 percent of the vote. His 31,629,783 votes was not only the highest count ever recorded in a presidential election, but close to the sum total of the two previous records combined.

Marcos's presidential transition began on May 25, 2022, when the Congress of the Philippines proclaimed his candidacy as the winner of the 2022 Philippine presidential election held on May 9, 2022.

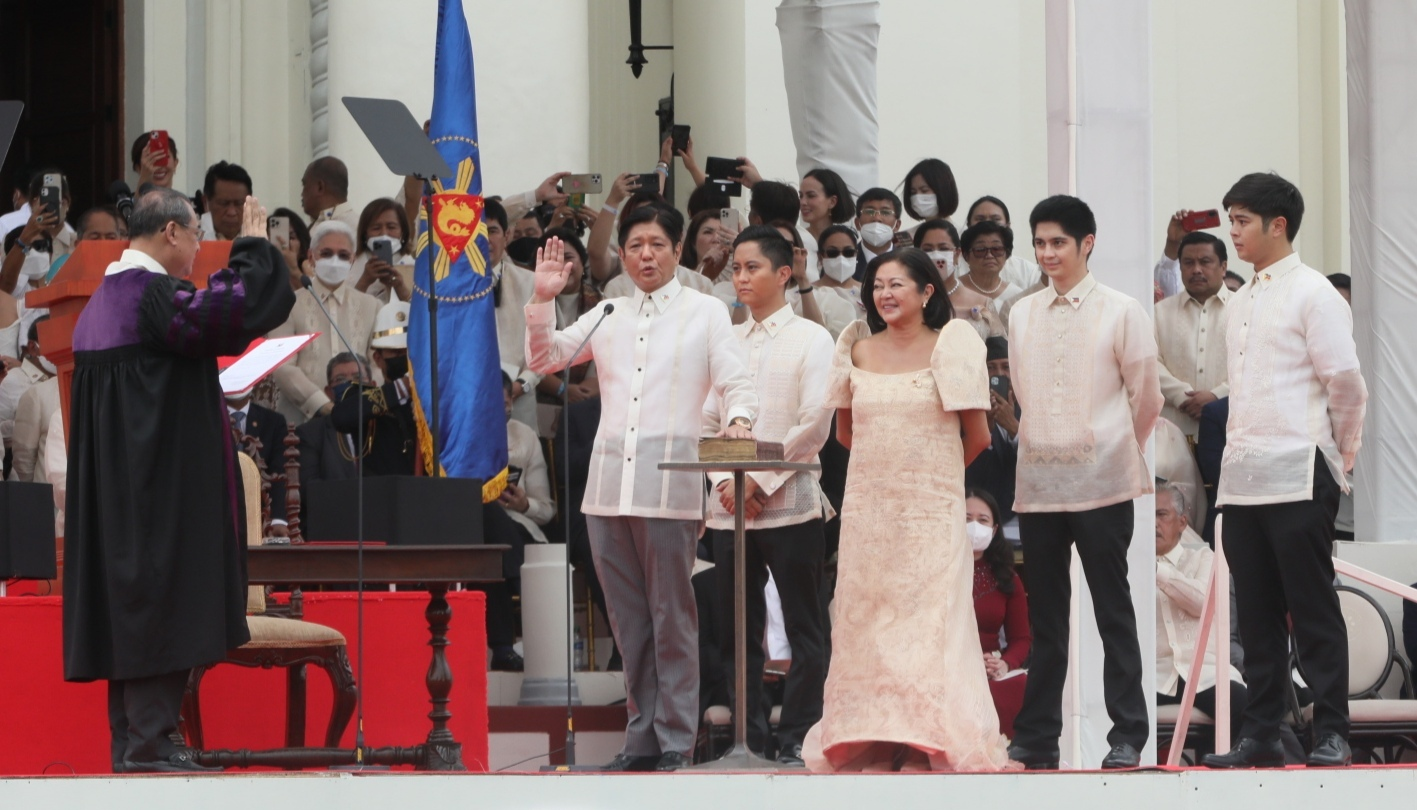
Marcos with his family and Chief Justice Alexander Gesmundo as he takes his oath as the 17th President of the Philippines.

Marcos was inaugurated as the seventeenth president of the Philippines on June 30, 2022, at the National Museum of Fine Arts. He was sworn in by Alexander Gesmundo, Chief Justice of the Supreme Court of the Philippines. The inaugural ceremony was notable for his meeting with outgoing president Rodrigo Duterte at the Malacañang Palace whose departure honors were also held at the complex, the military-civic parade, and his 25-minute speech that gives a view of what his presidency will look like.

Quirino Grandstand was the original venue for Marcos's inauguration. It was moved to the National Museum since the Manila COVID-19 Field Hospital still occupied the site at the time of the inauguration.

== Major activities ==
=== Speeches ===
Marcos delivers his First State of the Nation Address on July 25, 2022, with Senate President Migz Zubiri (seated left) and House Speaker Martin Romualdez.

- Inaugural Address (June 30, 2022)
- First State of the Nation Address (July 25, 2022)
- Second State of the Nation Address (July 24, 2023)
- Third State of the Nation Address (July 22, 2024)
- Fourth State of the Nation Address (July 28, 2025)
- Fifth State of the Nation Address (July 27, 2026)

=== Major acts and legislation ===
Marcos has signed 249 bills into law, 60 of which are national in scope.

=== Executive issuances ===
Bongbong Marcos has signed a total of 97 executive orders, issued 1,041 proclamations, 37 administrative orders, 36 memorandum orders, 98 memorandum circulars, and two special orders.

=== National budget ===
R. A. No.	Title	Principal Sponsor	Date signed	Ref(s).
11936	General Appropriations Act of 2023	Sonny Angara	December 16, 2022	
11975	General Appropriations Act of 2024	Sonny Angara	December 20, 2023	
12116	General Appropriations Act of 2025	Grace Poe	December 30, 2024	
12314	General Appropriations Act of 2026	Sherwin Gatchalian	January 5, 2026	

== Leadership style ==
Marcos during a situation briefing with his administration on the effects of Tropical Storm Kristine on October 23, 2024

Marcos's leadership style was described by his press secretary Trixie Cruz-Angeles as being "more systematic and efficient", compared to his predecessor Rodrigo Duterte, who was driven by passion. Cruz-Angeles described Marcos as "conservative", and "very up to date" with technology and global issues.

Marcos, in contrast with his predecessor Duterte, is noted for consistently limiting his exposure to journalists and the media. During his presidential campaign, Marcos was criticized for eluding debates and media interviews. After assuming office, he signed his second executive order abolishing the presidential spokesperson position and replacing it with a press secretary. Under Marcos, the Malacañang Palace holds fewer press briefings than the Duterte administration, typically holding a single press briefing per week. The Marcos administration also created a "pool" system, in which the Presidential Communications Office limits the number of media members who could attend press briefings or cover certain events.

Marcos said he would sometimes consult his wife, Liza Araneta, who is a lawyer, regarding "legal matters", saying "I'm not a lawyer, so I need an expert opinion".

== Administration and cabinet ==
Marcos began naming his Cabinet members on May 12, 2022. Following his presidential inauguration, he administered a mass oath-taking of his Cabinet officials.

Marcos appointed his long time chief-of-staff and spokesperson, Vic Rodriguez as his Executive Secretary. Upon the recommendation of his Chief Presidential Legal Counsel, Juan Ponce Enrile, Marcos rejected the plan of Rodriguez to grant himself additional powers as Marcos's new Presidential Chief of Staff following his resignation as Executive Secretary on September 17 due to issues involving his roles in the sugar importation order fiasco and contentious appointments of some government officials. He was replaced by former Supreme Court Chief Justice Lucas Bersamin on September 27.

On October 4, 2022, Marcos reappointed 10 cabinet members after they were bypassed by the Commission on Appointments (COA) on September 28; COA chairperson Jose Calida and Press Secretary Trixie Cruz-Angeles resigned the same day.

On May 22, 2025, following the results of the midterm elections, Marcos called for the courtesy resignations of his cabinet members, agency heads, and presidential advisers, initiating the first major cabinet reshuffle since the Arroyo administration. Executive Secretary Lucas Bersamin later announced that while the resignations of several officials—including the Secretaries of Foreign Affairs, Environment, and Housing—were accepted and replacements appointed, others in key economic and security posts were retained. In a second wave of changes, the Solicitor General and the Chairperson of the Commission on Higher Education were replaced, while the Secretaries of Defense, Justice, and the Interior remained in their positions.

Office	Name	Term	Refs.
President	Bongbong Marcos	June 30, 2022 –	
Vice President	Sara Duterte	June 30, 2022 –	
Executive Secretary	Vic Rodriguez	June 30, 2022 – September 17, 2022	
Executive Secretary	Lucas Bersamin	September 27, 2022 – November 17, 2025	
Executive Secretary	Ralph Recto	November 17, 2025 –	
Secretary of Agriculture	Bongbong Marcos	June 30, 2022 – November 3, 2023	
Secretary of Agriculture	Francisco Tiu Laurel Jr.	November 3, 2023 –	
Secretary of Education	Sara Duterte	June 30, 2022 – July 19, 2024	
Secretary of Education	Sonny Angara	July 19, 2024 –	
Secretary of Foreign Affairs	Enrique Manalo	July 1, 2022 – July 1, 2025	
Secretary of Foreign Affairs	Tess Lazaro	July 1, 2025 –	
Secretary of Finance	Benjamin Diokno	June 30, 2022 – January 12, 2024	
Secretary of Finance	Ralph Recto	January 12, 2024 – November 17, 2025	
Secretary of Finance	Frederick Go	November 17, 2025 –	
Secretary of Justice	Jesus Crispin Remulla	June 30, 2022 – October 9, 2025	
Secretary of Justice	Fredderick Vida (Acting) (Note: Vida served in an Officer–in–Charge capacity from October 10, 2025 until November 13, 2025.)	October 10, 2025 –	
Secretary of Public Works and Highways	Manuel Bonoan	June 30, 2022 –September 1, 2025	
Secretary of Public Works and Highways	Vince Dizon (Acting)	September 1, 2025 –October 26, 2026	
Secretary of Public Works and Highways	Giovanni Z. Lopez	October 26, 2026 –	
Secretary of Labor and Employment	Bienvenido Laguesma	June 30, 2022 – May 25, 2026	
Secretary of Labor and Employment	Francis Tolentino (Acting)	May 25, 2026 –	
Secretary of National Defense	Jose Faustino Jr. (OIC) (Note: As Faustino retired from military service on November 12, 2021, in adherence to Republic Act 6975 banning the appointment of retired military officers for a year, he will first serve as a senior undersecretary and officer-in-charge of the Department of National Defense beginning June 30, 2022.)	June 30, 2022 –January 9, 2023	
Secretary of National Defense	Carlito Galvez Jr. (OIC)	January 9, 2023 – June 5, 2023	
Secretary of National Defense	Gilbert Teodoro	June 5, 2023 –	
Secretary of Health	Maria Rosario Vergeire (OIC)	July 14, 2022 – June 5, 2023	
Secretary of Health	Ted Herbosa	June 5, 2023 – July 13, 2026	
Secretary of Health	Jose Pujalte Jr.	July 13, 2026 – August 10, 2026	
Secretary of Health	Edwin Mercado	August 10, 2026 –	
Secretary of Trade and Industry	Alfredo E. Pascual	June 30, 2022 – August 2, 2024	
Secretary of Trade and Industry	Cristina Aldeguer-Roque (Note: Aldeguer-Roque served in an acting capacity from August 3 until October 27, 2024.)	August 2, 2024 –	
Secretary of Migrant Workers	Susan Ople	June 30, 2022 –August 22, 2023	
Secretary of Migrant Workers	Hans Cacdac (Note: Cacdac served in an Officer–in–Charge capacity from August 22 to September 7, 2023.)	September 7, 2023 –	
Secretary of Human Settlements and Urban Development	Melissa Ardanas (OIC)	June 30, 2022 – July 29, 2022	
Secretary of Human Settlements and Urban Development	Jose Acuzar	July 29, 2022 – May 22, 2025	
Secretary of Human Settlements and Urban Development	Jose Ramon Aliling	May 23, 2025 –	
Secretary of Social Welfare and Development	Erwin Tulfo	June 30, 2022 – December 23, 2022	
Secretary of Social Welfare and Development	Eduardo Punay (OIC)	December 23, 2022 – January 31, 2023	
Secretary of Social Welfare and Development	Rex Gatchalian	January 31, 2023 –	
Secretary of Agrarian Reform	Conrado Estrella III	June 30, 2022 –	
Secretary of Environment and Natural Resources	Ernesto D. Adobo Jr. (OIC)	June 30, 2022 – July 11, 2022	
Secretary of Environment and Natural Resources	Toni Yulo-Loyzaga	July 12, 2022 – May 22, 2025	
Secretary of Environment and Natural Resources	Raphael Lotilla	May 23, 2025 – February 27, 2026	
Secretary of Environment and Natural Resources	Juan Miguel T. Cuna (Acting)	February 27, 2026 –	
Secretary of the Interior and Local Government	Benhur Abalos	June 30, 2022 – October 7, 2024	
Secretary of the Interior and Local Government	Jonvic Remulla	October 8, 2024 –	
Secretary of Tourism	Christina Frasco	June 30, 2022 – March 12, 2026	
Secretary of Tourism	Verna Buensuceso (OIC)	March 18, 2026 – April 9, 2026	
Secretary of Tourism	Dita Angara-Mathay	April 10, 2026 –	
Secretary of Transportation	Jaime Bautista	June 30, 2022 – February 21, 2025	
Secretary of Transportation	Vince Dizon	February 21, 2025 – September 1, 2025	
Secretary of Transportation	Giovanni Z. Lopez (Acting)	September 1, 2025 – October 26, 2026	
Secretary of Transportation	Vince Dizon	October 26, 2026 –	
Secretary of Science and Technology	Renato Solidum Jr.	July 22, 2022 (Note: Solidum served as the Officer–in–Charge from June 30 to July 22, 2022.) –	
Secretary of Budget and Management	Amenah Pangandaman	June 30, 2022 –November 17, 2025	
Secretary of Budget and Management	Rolando Toledo (Note: Toledo served in an Officer–in–Charge capacity from November 24, 2025, until December 9, 2025.) (Acting)	November 17, 2025 – May 18, 2026	
Secretary of Budget and Management	Kim Robert de Leon	May 19, 2026 –	
Secretary of Energy	Raphael Lotilla	July 11, 2022 – May 22, 2025	
Secretary of Energy	Sharon Garin (Note: Garin served as the Officer–in–Charge from May 23 to July 10, 2025.)	May 23, 2025 –	
Secretary of Information and Communications Technology	Ivan John Uy	June 30, 2022 –March 6, 2025	
Secretary of Information and Communications Technology	Paul Mercado (OIC)	March 10, 2025 – March 19, 2025	
Secretary of Information and Communications Technology	Henry Aguda	March 20, 2025 – October 9, 2026	
Secretary of Information and Communications Technology	Robert Joseph M. de Claro	October 13, 2026 –	
Secretary of the National Economic and Development Authority/ Secretary of Economy, Planning, and Development	Arsenio M. Balisacan	June 30, 2022 –	
Lead Convenor of the National Anti-Poverty Commission	Lope B. Santos III	February 20, 2023 – September 8, 2026	
Lead Convenor of the National Anti-Poverty Commission	Emmanuel D. Pacquiao	September 8, 2026 –	
National Security Adviser	Clarita Carlos	June 30, 2022 – January 14, 2023	
National Security Adviser	Eduardo Año	January 14, 2023 –	
Secretary of the Presidential Management Staff	Zenaida Angping	June 30, 2022 – December 2, 2022	
Secretary of the Presidential Management Staff	Elaine Masukat	January 3, 2023 –	
Solicitor General	Menardo Guevarra	June 30, 2022 – May 29, 2025	
Solicitor General	Darlene Berberabe	May 29, 2025 –	
Chief Presidential Legal Counsel	Juan Ponce Enrile	June 30, 2022 – November 13, 2025	
Chief Presidential Legal Counsel	Anna Liza Logan	December 16, 2025 –	
Presidential Adviser on Peace, Reconciliation and Unity	Carlito Galvez Jr.	June 30, 2022 – January 9, 2023	
Presidential Adviser on Peace, Reconciliation and Unity	Isidro Purisima	February 23, 2023 – June 26, 2023	
Presidential Adviser on Peace, Reconciliation and Unity	Carlito Galvez Jr.	June 26, 2023 –April 21, 2026	
Presidential Adviser on Peace, Reconciliation and Unity	Mel Senen Sarmiento	April 21, 2026 –	
Presidential Adviser on Creative Communications	Paul Soriano	October 17, 2022 –November 9, 2023	
Presidential Adviser for Mindanao Concerns	Antonio Cerilles	March 13, 2025 –	
Presidential Adviser for Pasig River Development	Jose Acuzar	May 23, 2025 –	
Presidential Adviser for Poverty Alleviation	Larry Gadon	June 26, 2023 –	
Presidential Assistant for Maritime Concerns	Andres Centino	September 28, 2023 –	
Presidential Adviser on Military and Police Affairs	Roman A. Felix	August 3, 2022 – June 19, 2025	
Presidential Adviser on Legislative Affairs and Head of Presidential Legislative Liaison Office	Mark Llandro Mendoza	August 23, 2022 – June 19, 2025	
Presidential Adviser on Legislative Affairs and Head of Presidential Legislative Liaison Office	Joey Salceda	July 20, 2026 –	
Presidential Communications Group	Trixie Cruz-Angeles	June 30, 2022 – October 4, 2022	
Presidential Communications Group	Cheloy Garafil	October 4, 2022 (Note: Garafil served as the Officer–in–Charge from October 7, 2022 to January 10, 2023.) – September 5, 2024	
Presidential Communications Group	Cesar Chavez (OIC)	September 5, 2024 – March 1, 2025	
Presidential Communications Group	Jay Ruiz	March 1, 2025 – July 10, 2025	
Presidential Communications Group	Dave Gomez	July 10, 2025 – October 12, 2026	
Presidential Communications Group	Lino Cayetano	October 13, 2026 –	
Special Assistant to the President	Antonio Lagdameo Jr.	June 30, 2022 –	
Special Assistant to the President for Investment and Economic Affairs	Frederick Go	January 12, 2024 (Note: Served as Presidential Adviser on Investment and Economic Affairs from January 30, 2023 to January 12, 2024.) –November 17, 2025	

== First 100 days ==
The Marcos administration faced challenges during this period such as a domestic sugar supply shortage in mid-2022, rising inflation rate brought about by the pandemic, and the economic effects of the Russian invasion of Ukraine.

Immediately after taking his oath of office on June 30, 2022, Marcos, in an attempt to "achieve simplicity, economy, and efficiency in the bureaucracy", issued his first executive order abolishing both the Presidential Anti-Corruption Commission created by President Duterte in 2017 and the Office of the Cabinet Secretary. The Marcos administration launched its COVID-19 booster shot campaign, PinasLakas, to administer booster doses to at least 23 million Filipinos during Marcos's first 100 days, but managed to boost only 3.5 million. Marcos issued an executive order allowing voluntary use of face masks in outdoor settings, and extended from September 13 to December 31, 2022, the period of the state of calamity declared by his predecessor, Rodrigo Duterte, due to the COVID-19.

The Marcos administration launched its anti-illegal drug campaign, Buhay Ingatan, Droga'y Ayawan (BIDA), which commits to continue the war on drugs "within the framework of the law and with respect for human rights and with focus on rehabilitation and socio-economic development".

== Domestic affairs ==
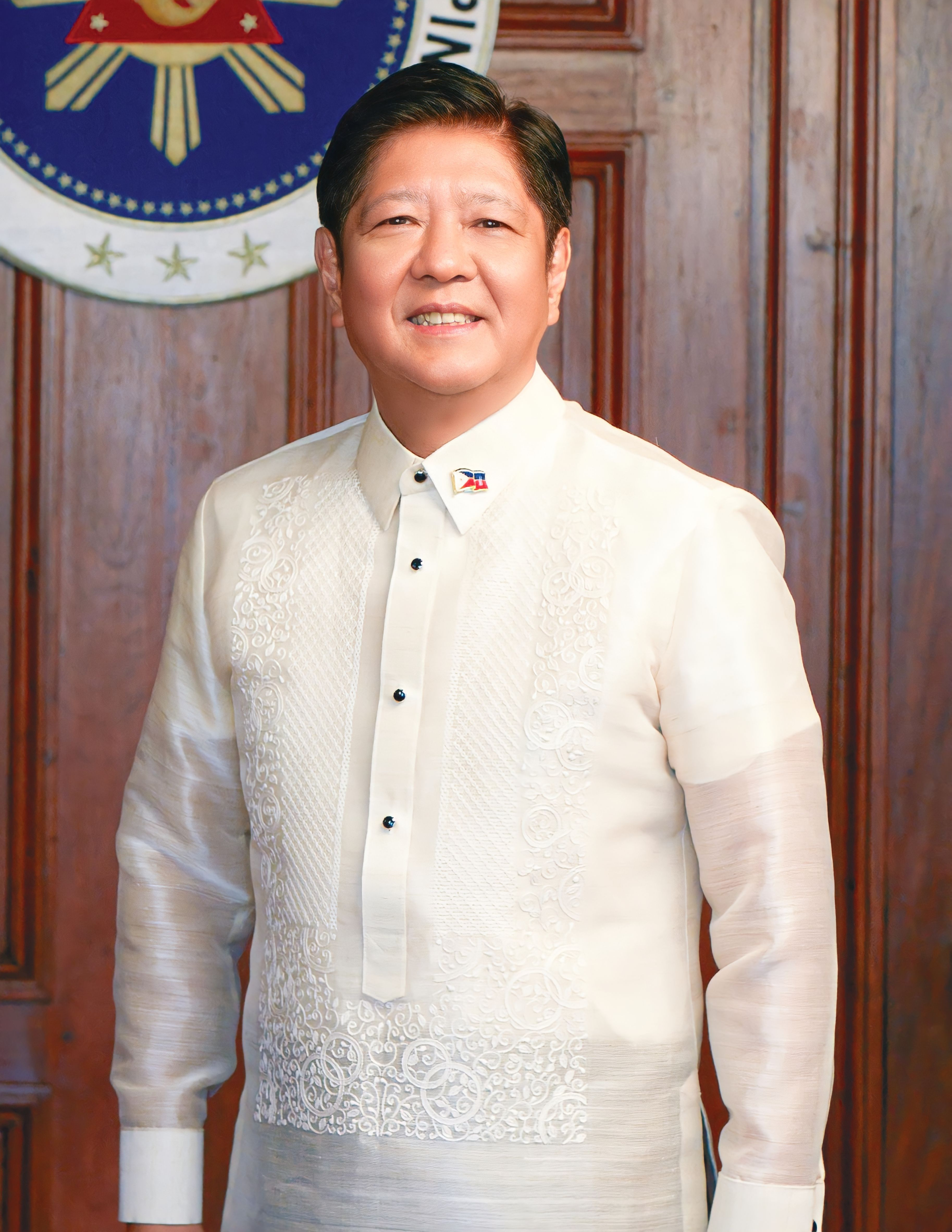
Official portrait, 2023

=== 10-point agenda ===
Marcos launched a 10-point agenda as part of his vision to further boost economic growth and rejuvenate the country's prosperity in the aftermath of the COVID-19 pandemic. Marcos's agenda includes the following:

- National Reopening- aimed to reopen the face to face classes in schools throughout the country, and revitalize the country's tourism sectors.
- Public-Private Partnership- aimed to further deepen the engagements of the public and private sectors to further boost investments.
- Infrastructure Development- expansion of the Build! Build! Build! program under the Build Better More program.
- Fiscal Discipline- aimed to efficiency in tax collection through digitization.
- Transparent & Efficient Governance- establish efficiency in government processes through online systems and combat red tape.
- Digital Philippines- implementation of the Broadband ng Masa (BBM) program set to improve the country's internet services.
- Energy Security- boost local power generation and capacity through renewable energy sources and proper distribution.
- Future-ready Filipinos- provide quality education through top notch learning materials and technology tools.
- Affordable Healthcare- lower cost of medicines, expand pandemic preparedness, and build regional specialty hospitals.
- Food for All- increase agricultural output and improve the supply chain.

=== Agriculture and agrarian reform ===
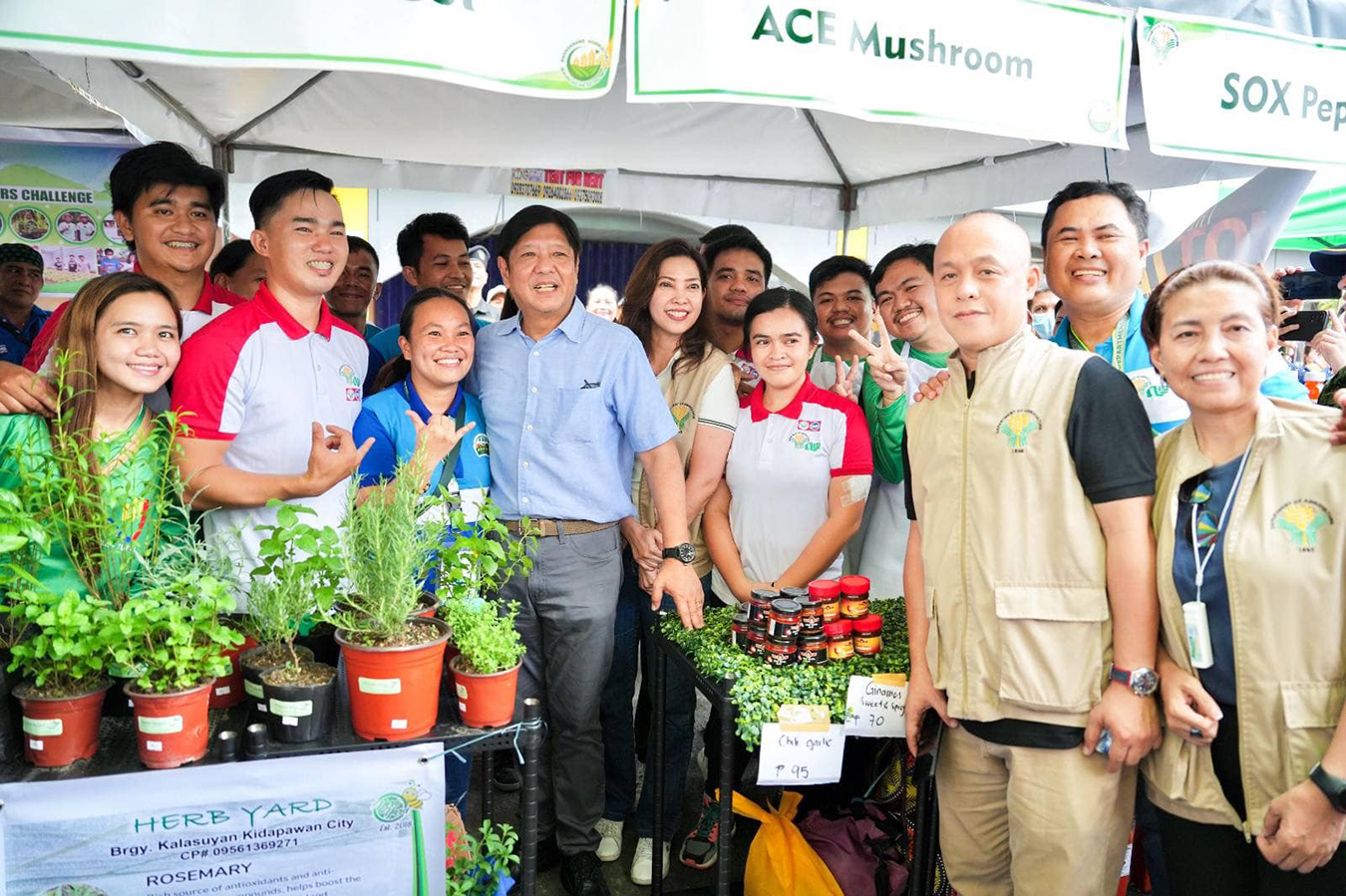
Marcos at a Kadiwa Project outlet in Koronadal, South Cotabato, in June 2023

Subsequently serving as the Secretary of Agriculture, Marcos launched initiatives which aims to improve domestic agricultural output and production, while expanding measures to further establish a farm-to-market approach in providing agricultural products to local markets and far flung areas. In August 2022, as high sugar prices impacted the country due to the effects of Typhoon Odette in December 2021, the Sugar Regulatory Administration (SRA) in August 2022 released an order to import 300,000 metric tons (660,000,000 lb) of sugar, which is aimed to reduce costs and increase the sugar stockpiles. A few days later, Marcos rejected the proposed importation, and Malacañang deemed the move as illegal, as the move was made without Marcos's approval, nor signed by him. SRA Undersecretary Leocadio Sebastian later apologized for the move and later resigned his post on Marcos; behalf, prompting SRA Administrator Hermenegildo Serafica and SRA board member Roland Beltran to follow suit a few days later. The move also caused Malacañang to instigate reforms within the SRA organization, and launched a campaign into alleged efforts of using the sugar order as a "cover measure" for hoarding by sugar traders.

In November 2022, Marcos expanded the Kadiwa Project launched by the Duterte administration, which aims to offer fresh local produces to local markets and other key areas in lower prices, and creates a direct farm-to-market approach of goods and services. The programs is located in various areas throughout the country and temporarily occupies various facilities owned by local governments. The move is also aimed to be expanded permanently to accommodate more consumers affected by inflation.

In January 2023, amid rising prices of onions in the country, Marcos approved the importation of 21,060 metric tons (46,430,000 lb) of onions to cater the gap caused by low local outputs, and stated that the government was "left without a choice" despite approving the smuggled onions to be supplied in local markets.

Marcos signed his fourth executive order on September 14, 2022, which establishes a one-year moratorium on the amortization and interest payments of agrarian reform beneficiaries. The move is seen to assist farmers from debt payments and allows a flexible approach in financial assistance.

In July 2023, Marcos signed the New Agrarian Emancipation Act, freeing at least 600,000 agrarian reform beneficiaries of decades-old debts worth ₱57-billion under the Comprehensive Agrarian Reform Program.

After serving as Secretary of Agriculture for over a year that was marked by a rise in food prices, Marcos relinquished his position and appointed Francisco Tiu Laurel Jr., president of a deep-sea fishing company and a donor to Marcos's 2022 presidential election campaign.

==== Agrarian reform ====
On his 65th birthday, September 14, 2022, Marcos signed his fourth executive order imposing a one-year moratorium on the amortization and interest payments of agrarian reform beneficiaries, which is seen to "lead to freedom of farmers from debts".

=== ‘Bagong Pilipinas’ hymn, pledge and slogan ===
The "Bagong Pilipinas" branding of Marcos's governance released in July 2023

On June 4, 2024, Marcos Jr., through Executive Secretary Lucas Bersamin, signed Memorandum Circular No. 52, directing all government agencies and schools to include the recitation of the Bagong Pilipinas hymn - Panahon na ng Pagbabago and Panata sa Bagong Pilipinas pledge in weekly flag ceremonies. Critics argued that the memorandum violates Republic Act No. 8491 or the "Flag and Heraldic Code of the Philippines". The new hymn has also been noted for resembling the Bagong Pagsilang hymn of the martial law era of Marcos' father. Earlier in July 2023, Marcos Jr. also ordered government agencies to include Bagong Pilipinas slogan in their programs and projects.

=== Disinformation ===
Under the Marcos administration, the Movie and Television Review and Classification Board (MTRCB) in December 2023 suspended for 14 days two shows of media network SMNI, Laban Kasama ang Bayan (LKB) and President Duterte's platform Gikan sa Masa, Para sa Masa; the MTRCB said the suspension was made due to an "unverified news report" made by a LKB host and former communist rebel Jeffrey "Ka Eric" Celiz suggesting that House Speaker Martin Romualdez had travel funds worth ₱1.8 billion and complaints that a death threat to leftist ACT Teachers Representative France Castro was allegedly made by Duterte in the Gikan sa Masa, para sa Masa program. Two days later, the National Telecommunications Commission (NTC) suspended SMNI for 30 days after the House of Representatives adopted a resolution filed by PBA Partylist Representative Margarita Nograles, who claimed that the network was propagating false information. On January 23, 2024, the NTC ordered the indefinite suspension of SMNI on all radio and TV stations, on grounds that SMNI "failed to strictly comply with the thirty-day suspension order".

=== Crime ===
Following a meeting on July 27, 2022, with Solicitor General Menardo Guevarra, Presidential Legal Adviser Juan Ponce Enrile, Executive Secretary Vic Rodriguez, Foreign Affairs Secretary Enrique Manalo, Justice Secretary Jesus Crispin Remulla, and lawyer Harry Roque, Marcos, on August 1, said that the Philippines has no intention of rejoining the International Criminal Court (ICC), maintaining that deaths linked to the war on drugs of the Duterte administration are already being investigated by the Philippine government. By September 9, the deadline imposed by the ICC Office of the Prosecutor's (OTP) for the Philippine government to comment on the resumption of the investigation on the war on drugs, Guevara formally requested the ICC to deny the request of the ICC-OTP to resume the investigation; Guevara maintained that "the alleged murder incidents that happened during the relevant period do not constitute 'crimes against humanity', considering that said incidents do not qualify as an 'attack' against the civilian population". In January 2024, Marcos stated he considers the ICC investigation a threat to the Philippines' sovereignty, adding he "will not lift a finger" to assist any ICC investigation. However, former Senator and President Duterte's staunch critic Antonio Trillanes remarked on April 24, 2024, that ICC investigators have "already directly communicated with more than 50 active and former PNP [police] officials" regarding their implication in the drug war.

According to the Philippine National Police (PNP), index crimes dropped 11.67% in Marcos's first two months compared to the same period a year prior. Amid a series of reported abductions in the country, several senators urged Marcos to issue a strong directive and act swiftly on the matter. On September 15, 2022, the Senate initiated a probe into the series of kidnapping cases.

In June 2025, Marcos appointed police general Nicolas Torre III as PNP chief. He had previously enforced the arrests of Kingdom of Jesus Christ leader Apollo Quiboloy in September 2024 and former president Rodrigo Duterte in March 2025. On June 5, Torre began implementing a 5-minute response policy for PNP officials in Metro Manila. Four days later, Torre made an unprecedented courtesy visit to the Commission on Human Rights, where he affirmed the CHR's oversight function over the PNP by stating that "The CHR is our boss on the protection of human rights."

==== Drug policy ====
In 2022, Marcos declared his intention to continue the war on drugs of the Duterte administration. By September 13, Marcos explained that the war on illegal drugs is "of internal matter", opting to leave it out of his First State of the Nation Address; he said a working group was still formulating policies for his anti-drug campaign, with a focus on prevention and rehabilitation.

On October 7, 2022, the Marcos administration launched its anti-illegal drug campaign, Buhay Ingatan, Droga'y Ayawan (BIDA), which commits to continue the war on drugs "within the framework of the law and with respect for human rights and with focus on rehabilitation and socio-economic development".

In March 2025, former president Duterte was arrested by the PNP in collaboration with Interpol under an International Criminal Court warrant charging him with "crimes against humanity", with the operation codenamed "Operation Pursuit" and headed by then-CIDG chief Nicolas Torre. Minutes after Duterte's plane departed for the Netherlands, President Marcos held a press conference clarifying that the arrest was carried out not on behalf of the ICC (which the Philippines is not a member of) but as a member of Interpol, emphasizing that the Philippines must uphold its commitments and responsibilities as part of the international community.

As PNP Chief, Torre vocally criticized the "Oplan Tokhang" policy during the drug war of the Duterte administration as fundamentally "flawed", and denounced the claim that the number of drug war victims is highly exaggerated, stating that "This is fake news in its cruelest form. It trivializes the experience of the families of the victims."

=== Culture ===
In May 2023, Marcos signed an executive order forming an advisory and management center to ensure efficient management of the Malacañang Heritage Mansions. On August 24, 2023, he signed into law Republic Act No. 11961, strengthening the conservation and protection of Philippine cultural heritage.

=== Decentralization ===
Marcos suspended for one year and ordered a review of Executive Order 138 (EO 138) issued by President Duterte in 2021 that directs the full devolution of some executive functions to local government units. Marcos maintained that under EO 138, 4th, 5th, and 6th class municipalities will get poorer due to the extra functions that will be devolved; he added that "functions that belong to the national government should belong, should stay with the national government".

=== Defense ===
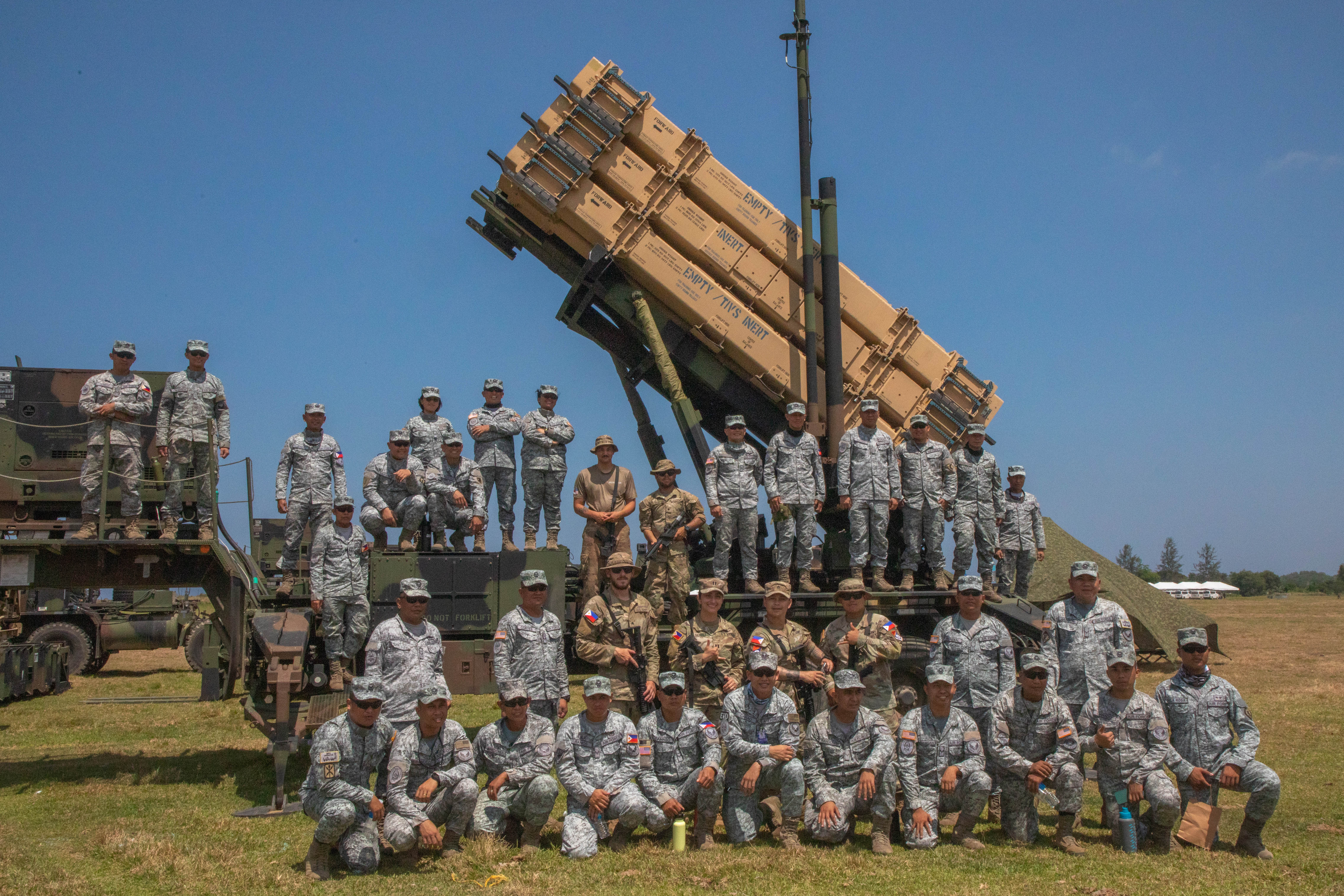
2023 Balikatan exercise.

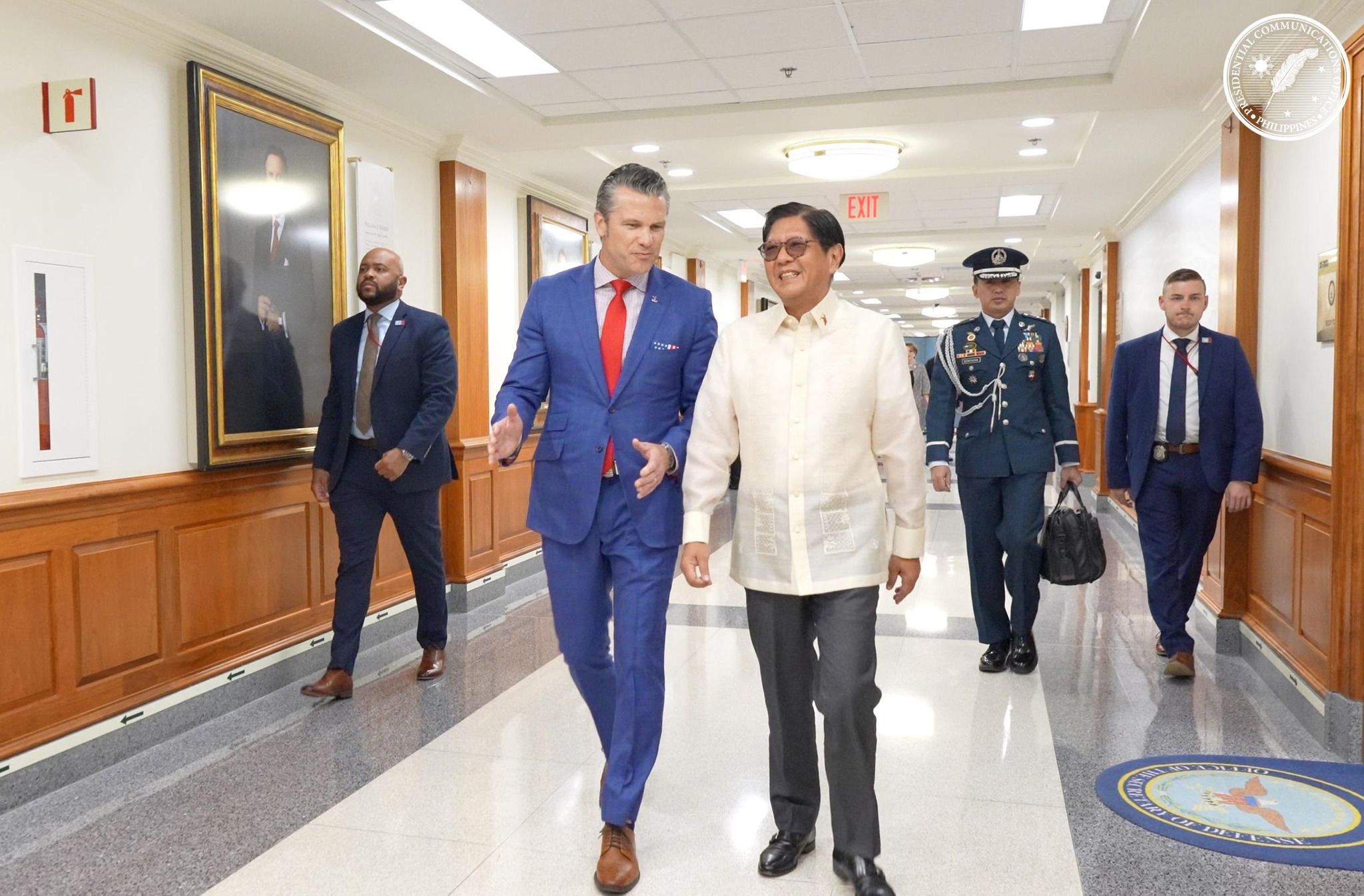
Marcos with U.S. Secretary of Defense Pete Hegseth during the former's visit to the Pentagon in Arlington, Virginia, July 21, 2025.

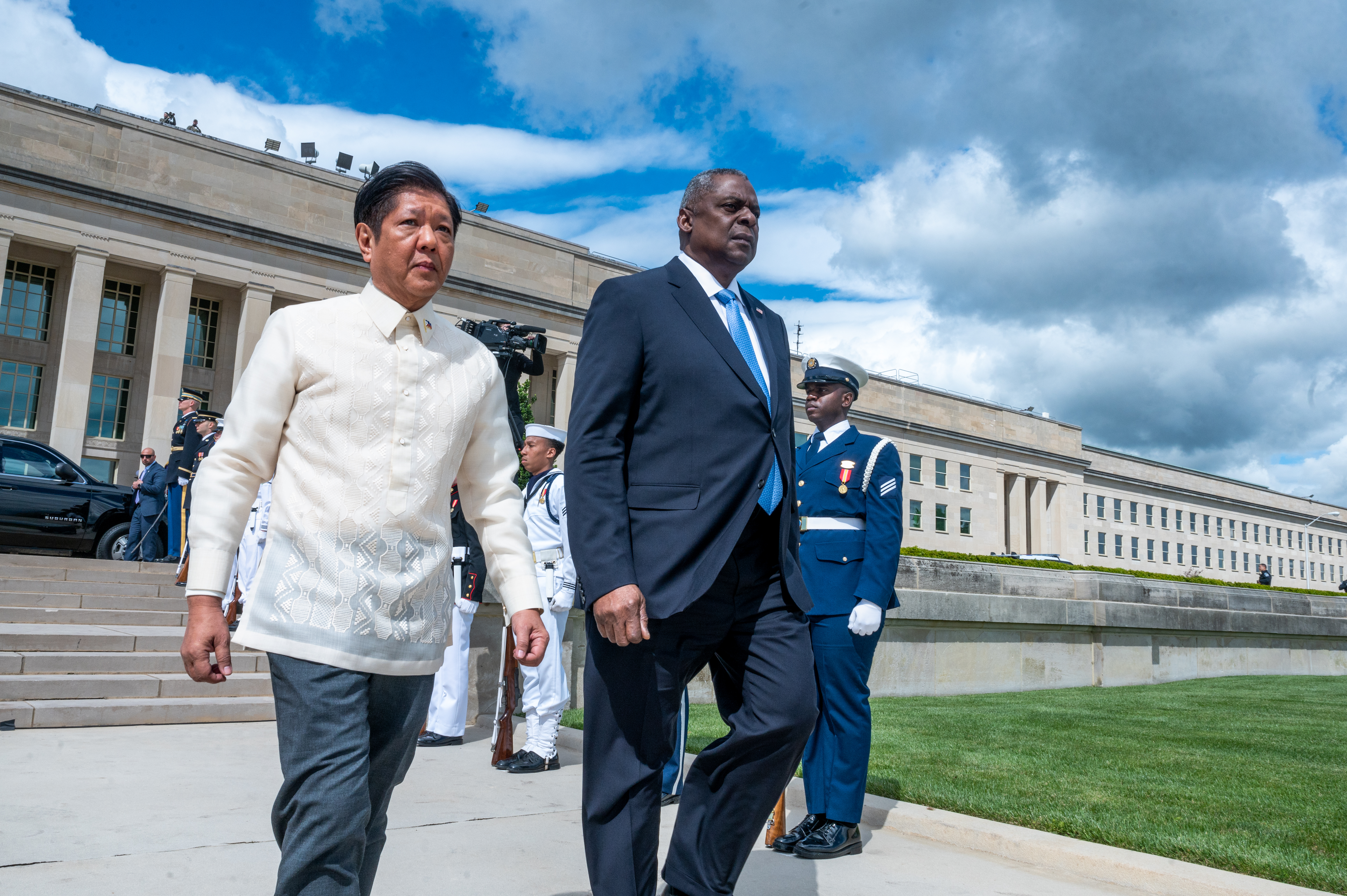
Marcos with then-U.S. Secretary of Defense Lloyd Austin during the former's visit to the Pentagon in Arlington, Virginia, May 3, 2023.

In August 2022, the Marcos administration said it was considering ordering helicopters from the United States military, such as the Boeing CH-47 Chinook, to replace the 16 Russian Mil Mi-17 military helicopters purchased by the Duterte administration, but cancelled the program a few days before the end of Duterte's term out of concerns about existing United States sanctions such as the Countering America's Adversaries Through Sanctions Act (CAATSA) and possible future sanctions in response to the ongoing 2022 Russian invasion of Ukraine. Negotiations are also ongoing to procure limited units which was paid by the government to Rosoboronexport.

Marcos expressed support for the AFP Modernization Program, which aims to boost the country's defense capabilities. Stating that the country's external security situation is becoming "more complex and unpredictable", Marcos ordered the Armed Forces of the Philippines to shift its focus on its defense operations against external threats, due to the lower risks in the country's insurgencies, the Russian invasion of Ukraine, and the potential Chinese invasion of Taiwan.

During the 125th-anniversary celebration of the Philippine Navy, Marcos announced plans to acquire the Philippines' first submarine. The French-based Naval Group, along with other contenders, has offered its Scorpène-class submarines to strengthen the Navy.

With an aim to enhance the country's defense capabilities, Marcos has approved the "Re-Horizon 3" of the AFP Modernization Program, which is also known as the RAFMP. The $35 billion plan revised modernization program will be spread out over 10 years and aims to modernize the Armed Forces of the Philippines based on the Comprehensive Archipelagic Defense Concept (CADC), a defense concept aimed at strengthening the country's external defense deterrence by projecting power within the Philippine's 200 nautical mile exclusive economic zone, Benham Rise, the Luzon Strait, and the Sulu Sea through inter-island defenses doctrines, multi-layered domain strategies, and long-range strike capabilities. The concept also aims to strengthen the country's aerial and maritime domain awareness, connectivity, and intelligence capabilities.

On April 15, 2025, Marcos signed into law Republic Act No. 12174, prohibiting the development, production, stockpiling, and use of chemical weapons in the Philippines.

=== Disaster resilience ===
After a 7.0 magnitude earthquake hit Luzon a few weeks after his presidential inauguration, Marcos rejected creating an executive department dedicated to disaster resilience, agreeing with his sister (Senator Imee Marcos), who said that creating a disaster response body under the Office of the President instead would "save the government a lot of money". In April 2023, Bongbong Marcos signed an executive order creating a disaster preparedness and response task force.

=== Economy ===
Real GDP growth rate (year-on-year) under the Marcos Jr. administration
Year	Quarter	Growth rate (%)
2022	3rd	7.6
2022	4th	7.2
2023	1st	6.4
2023	2nd	4.3
2023	3rd	6.0
2023	4th	5.6
2024	1st	5.7
2024	2nd	6.3
2024	3rd	5.2
2024	4th	5.2
2025	1st	5.4

About 63% of Filipinos considers themselves poor by the fourth quarter of 2024 amidsts the rising inflation, which was the highest since 2003. Exports began to decline during his administration. Following an all-time high of nearly $80 billion in 2022, it declined to $74 billion in 2023, and $68 billion in 2024.

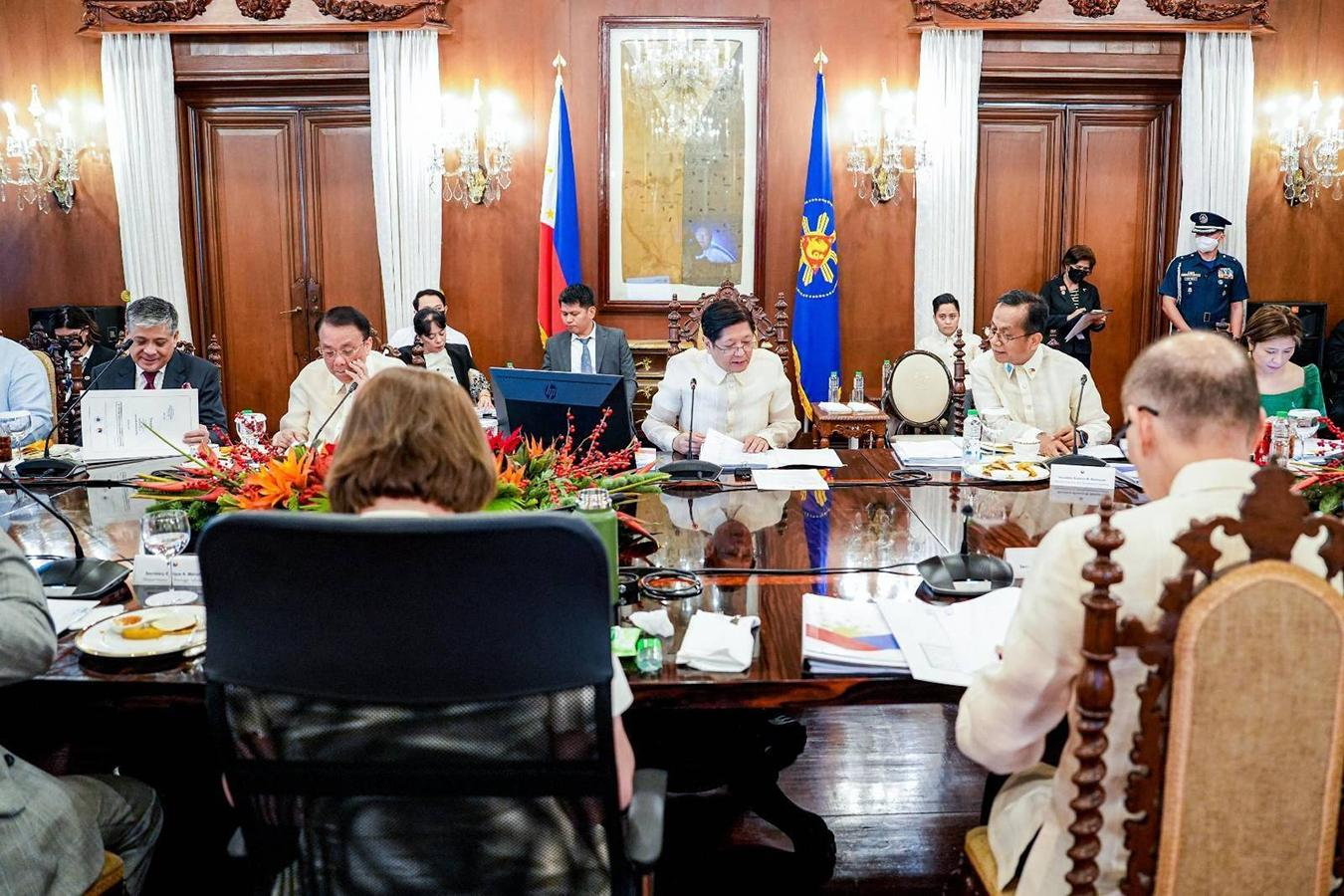
Marcos convenes a NEDA meeting at Malacañang Palace in December 2022, approving the Philippine Development Plan for 2023–2028.

The Marcos administration approved the inclusion of the Philippines to the Regional Comprehensive Economic Partnership (RCEP) free trade agreement, which was ratified by the Senate on February 21, 2023. His administration also formed the Private Sector Advisory Council, a council that will advise the President on economic affairs.

Marcos issued an executive order suspending e-sabong (online cockfighting) operations in the country. He also issued an executive order banning Philippine offshore gaming operators (POGOs), citing concerns for national security. Residential condominiums and offices markets were severely affected following the POGO ban, which saw a vacancy rate of up to 20.5% following the surrender of spaces and non-renewals of leases from POGOs.

=== Education ===
Amidst a learning crisis in the Philippines, Marcos appointed his then-running mate and now vice president Sara Duterte to concurrently serve as the Secretary of Education. Public schools in the Philippines started full in-person classes on November 2, 2022, after two years of hiatus due to the COVID-19 pandemic.

In August 2022, the Commission on Audit (COA) flagged the Department of Education (DepEd) for the purchase of allegedly overpriced and outdated 39,583 laptops worth ₱2.4 billion back in 2021 for online classes at the height of the pandemic. In response, Duterte requested from the COA a "fraud audit" of the laptop deal. Starting August 25, the Senate Blue Ribbon Committee, headed by Senator Francis Tolentino, held a series of hearings with previous officials of the DepEd and the Procurement Service of the Department of Budget and Management (PS-DBM), to look into the matter.

Amid a low full vaccination rate of 19% among Filipino students nationwide, the Marcos administration reopened classes in 46% of all schools in the country, or 24,000 schools on August 22, implementing five days of face-to-face classes; 29,721 schools were allowed to continue implementing blended learning from August to October 2022. A department order was signed, on September 2, by Duterte, automatically suspending all classes from kindergarten to senior high school during calamities and disasters; the order also prohibited the use of schools as long-term evacuation centers.

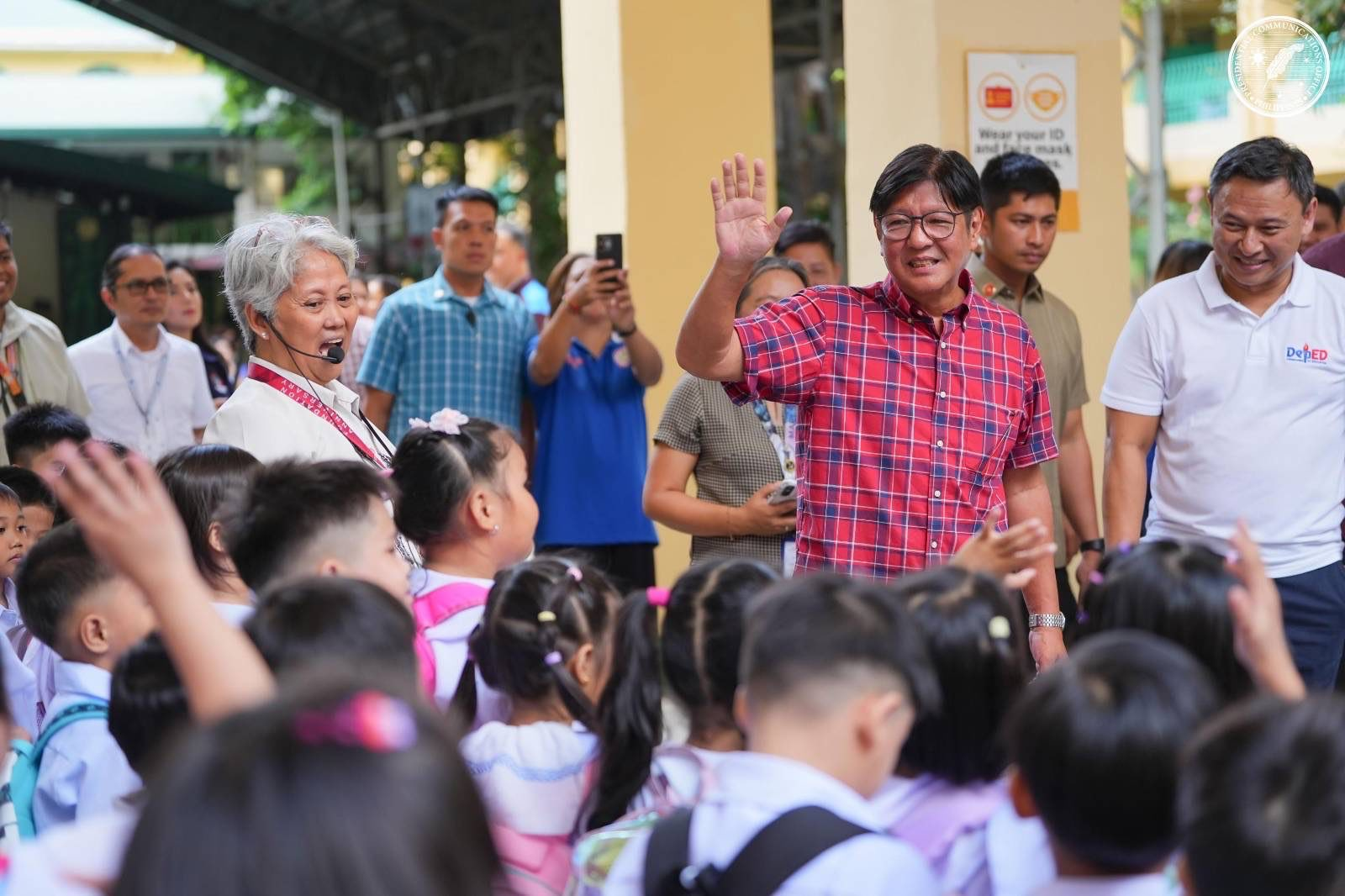
Marcos with DepEd Secretary Sonny Angara visiting at the Epifanio Delos Santos Elementary School in Malate, Manila on June 17, 2025, directing several government agencies to ensure the smooth and safe resumption of classes, while emphasizing the need to address students’ safety, well-being, and financial burden.

Under Sara Duterte's authority, the Department of Education in August 2023 launched the "Matatag curriculum", a new "less congested" curriculum for Kindergarten to Grade 10. The new curriculum reduced the learning areas for students from seven to five, and removed Mother Tongue as a separate subject; it also emphasized a "Makabansa" learning area to instill Filipino identity and nationalism among students.

In July 2024, Duterte resigned as education secretary, with Senator Sonny Angara appointed as her replacement. The choice of Angara as secretary received praise from lawmakers and teachers' organizations due to his qualifications, with several pointing out his immense challenge as secretary on account of the ongoing learning crisis and the "host of problems" left unresolved during Vice President Duterte's tenure. Upon assuming his post, Angara revealed during a House budget hearing several irregularities that had occurred at DepEd, among which were 1.5 million undistributed items such as laptops and textbooks from 2020, the delayed delivery of food for the agency's School-Based Feeding Program, and the agency's slow and inefficient fund use under Duterte.

=== Energy ===
President Marcos considers battery farms as a solution to the country's energy needs. In his first State of the Nation Address, Marcos presented his plan to increase energy production by including renewable energy and nuclear energy in the country's energy mix. In May 2023, Marcos renewed the Malampaya gas field contract which was to expire on February 22, 2024, extending it for 15 more years until 2039 and allowing oil companies to continue extracting natural gas from the field.

After President Marcos delivered his Fourth State of the Nation Address in 2025 wherein he called for a nationwide shift to renewable energy, he was criticized by Edwin Gariguez, a priest and environmentalist, for not concretely addressing the pollution and ecological destruction caused by several natural gas projects such as the Batangas LNG Plant.

=== Government reorganization ===
In an attempt to achieve "simplicity, economy, and efficiency" in the bureaucracy, Marcos, on June 30, 2022, issued his first executive order abolishing the Presidential Anti-Corruption Commission (PACC) created by Duterte in 2017, and the Office of the Cabinet Secretary. The powers and functions of PACC were transferred to the Office of the Deputy Executive Secretary for Legal Affairs, while the existing Cabinet Secretariat will be under the Presidential Management Staff.

A day after Marcos's inauguration, Executive Secretary Vic Rodriguez signed a memorandum circular declaring certain positions in the executive department held by officials appointed by Duterte as vacant, leaving at least 4,000 government positions needing to be filled up. Next-in-rank and most senior officials were to fill up the positions as officer-in-charge (OIC), although casual employees whose contracts were to expire on June 30, 2022, were allowed to serve only until July 31, 2022, unless earlier terminated or renewed. Rodriguez, on July 29, extended the terms of the OICs until December 31, or until a replacement has been made, "to ensure the continuous and effective delivery of government services".

On July 23, 2022, Marcos vetoed a bill strengthening the Office of the Government Corporate Counsel (OGCC) of the Department of Justice, citing "excessive grant of remuneration, incentives, benefits, allowances, and honoraria" to employees and hired lawyers. A week later, he vetoed a bill creating transportation safety board, explaining that the proposed board has functions already being "undertaken by the different agencies" under the Department of Transportation, the Philippine National Police, and the National Bureau of Investigation.

Marcos, on September 16, signed his fifth executive order, transferring the Technical Education and Skills Development Authority (TESDA) from the Department of Trade and Industry (DTI) to the Department of Labor and Employment (DOLE).

In an attempt to "accelerate reconstruction and recovery efforts" in Marawi, on December 22, 2023, Marcos signed an administrative order abolishing the Task Force Bangon Marawi and directing regular line agencies to take over the rehabilitation of the city. Marcos further ordered the agency's unused funds to be surrendered to the Office of the President.

=== Health ===
Through Proclamation No. 297, Marcos lifted the state of public health emergency issued in March 2020 by President Duterte following the onset of the COVID-19 pandemic. The proclamation lifted all established medical protocols, including the mandatory use of face masks; it also allowed emergency use authorizations (EUAs) for vaccines to remain for one year in order to exhaust the remaining vaccines.

Marcos allowed the controversial Vape Regulation Bill to lapse into law on July 25. The bill has been approved in January 2022 by both the Senate and the House of Representatives of the 18th Congress, but has been transmitted to Malacañang for Duterte to act upon only on June 24, six days before his presidency ended.

The Department of Health (DOH) launched on July 26 its "PinasLakas" campaign to continue administering COVID-19 booster doses to at least 39 million Filipinos, or 50% of the eligible population of 77 million, in Marcos's first 100 days of presidency. In September, the DOH lowered its target population to 23 million after seeing minimal progress in the booster campaign, which DOH officer-in-charge Maria Rosario Vergeire attributed to pandemic fatigue. By the end of Marcos's first 100 days, a total of 20 million Filipinos received their booster doses, of which 3.4 million received their first booster doses under the administration's booster campaign.

On August 31, Cebu City mayor Michael Rama signed an order making the wearing of face masks "non-obligatory" in his city, prompting the Department of the Interior and Local Government (DILG) to raise the issue of the lifting of face masks before the Inter-Agency Task Force for the Management of Emerging Infectious Diseases (IATF). The DOH maintained that face masks give 80% protection against COVID-19 and other contagious diseases, and expressed worry that other local government units would follow Rama's action; the DOH later agreed to allow the lifting of face masks only among low-risk individuals and in low-risk settings. On September 12, Marcos signed his third executive order, allowing voluntary use of face masks in outdoor settings with good ventilation. Following the recommendation of the National Disaster Risk Reduction and Management Council, Marcos, on September 13, signed a proclamation extending from September 13, 2022, to December 31, 2022, the period of the state of calamity declared by his predecessor, Rodrigo Duterte, due to the COVID-19.

To provide medical assistance to more people, in August 2023, Marcos signed a law establishing specialty centers in government hospitals in every region.

=== Human rights ===
President Bongbong Marcos promised to uphold human rights during his term. The Philippines stated in 2022 that it was committed to cooperate with United Nations human rights mechanisms. The United Nations noted the failure of law enforcement to address human rights violations and recommended that the Philippines review all killings in the government's drug war.

Drug war killings, attacks on activists, harassment of media, and red-tagging have continued. During the first year of Bongbong Marcos's term, there were 336 drug war killings, mostly during police operations, and 8 cases of forced disappearances. In 2024, the Commission on Human Rights said that human rights violations under the Duterte and Bongbong Marcos presidencies were almost similar. The Defend NGO Alliance stated that the human rights situation may have worsened under Bongbong Marcos. The alliance called for the abolition of repressive agencies and policies, such as the National Task Force to End Local Communist Armed Conflict and the Anti-Terrorism Act.

As of November 2024, four journalists have been killed while doing their jobs under the Bongbong Marcos presidency. This includes broadcaster Percy Lapid who was red-tagged and subsequently killed near his home. Journalists also continue to be red-tagged, harassed, or jailed, such as Frenchie Mae Cumpio, who is detained on allegations of terror financing.

Congress representatives and human rights groups have urged the Bongbong Marcos administration to rejoin the Rome Statute and the International Criminal Court. As of March 2025, the government has refused to rejoin the International Criminal Court.

=== Infrastructure ===
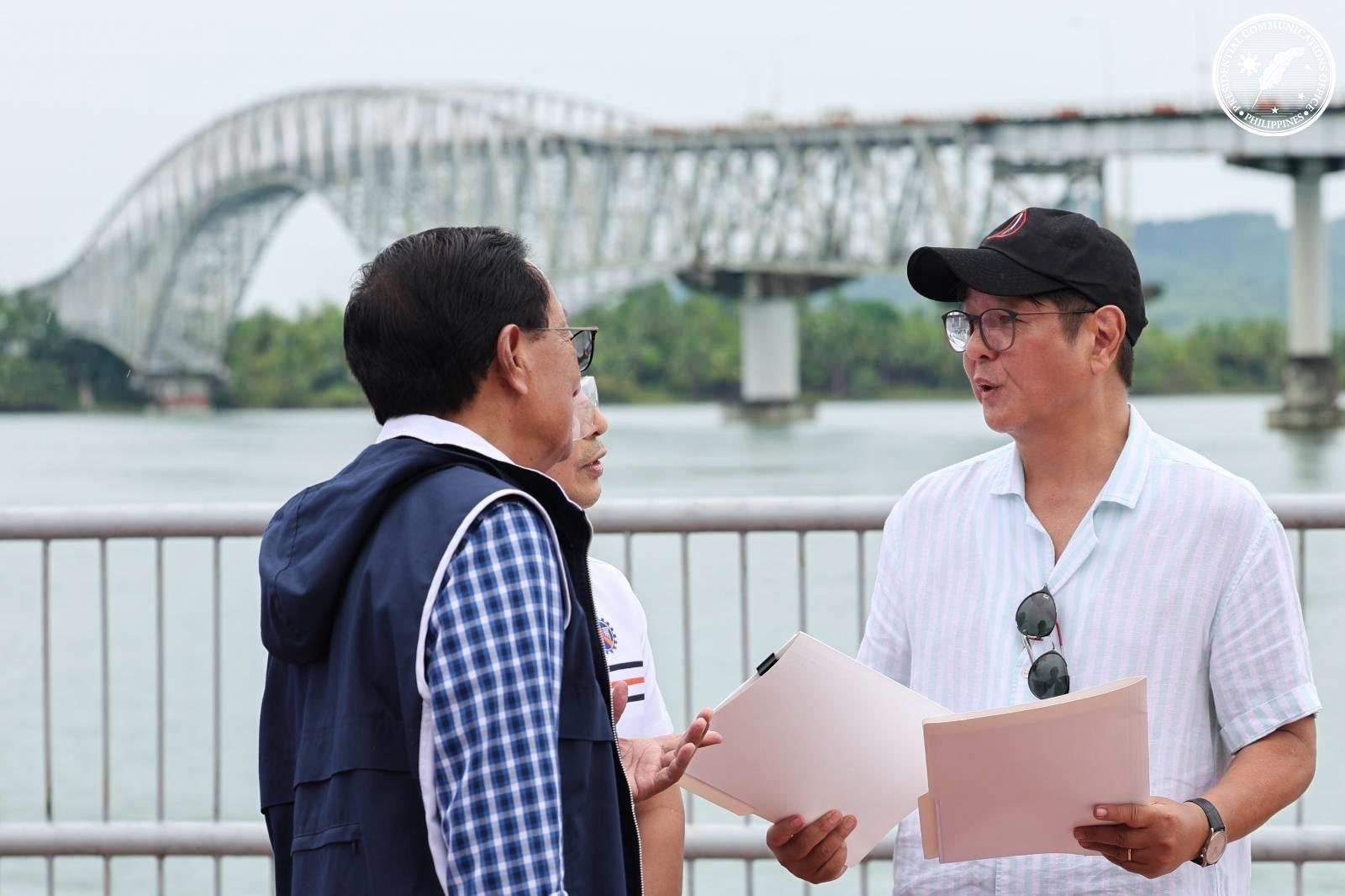
Marcos directing orders on then-DPWH Secretary Manuel Bonoan (left) after the former had inspected the severe corrosion damages at the San Juanico Bridge, June 11, 2025.

The Marcos administration decided to continue the Build! Build! Build! infrastructure program of President Duterte by superseding it with the Build Better More (BBM) program which added more infrastructure projects. The Marcos administration approved 194 infrastructure projects, with a total cost of PHP 9-trillion. It includes projects in public transport, physical connectivity, water resources, digital connectivity, health, agriculture, and power; 77 of these projects were carried from past administrations while 123 are "new and initiated" by the Marcos administration.

On August 23, the Marcos administration requested ₱1.196 trillion from Congress to fund in 2023 its BBM infrastructure program.

==== Public housing ====
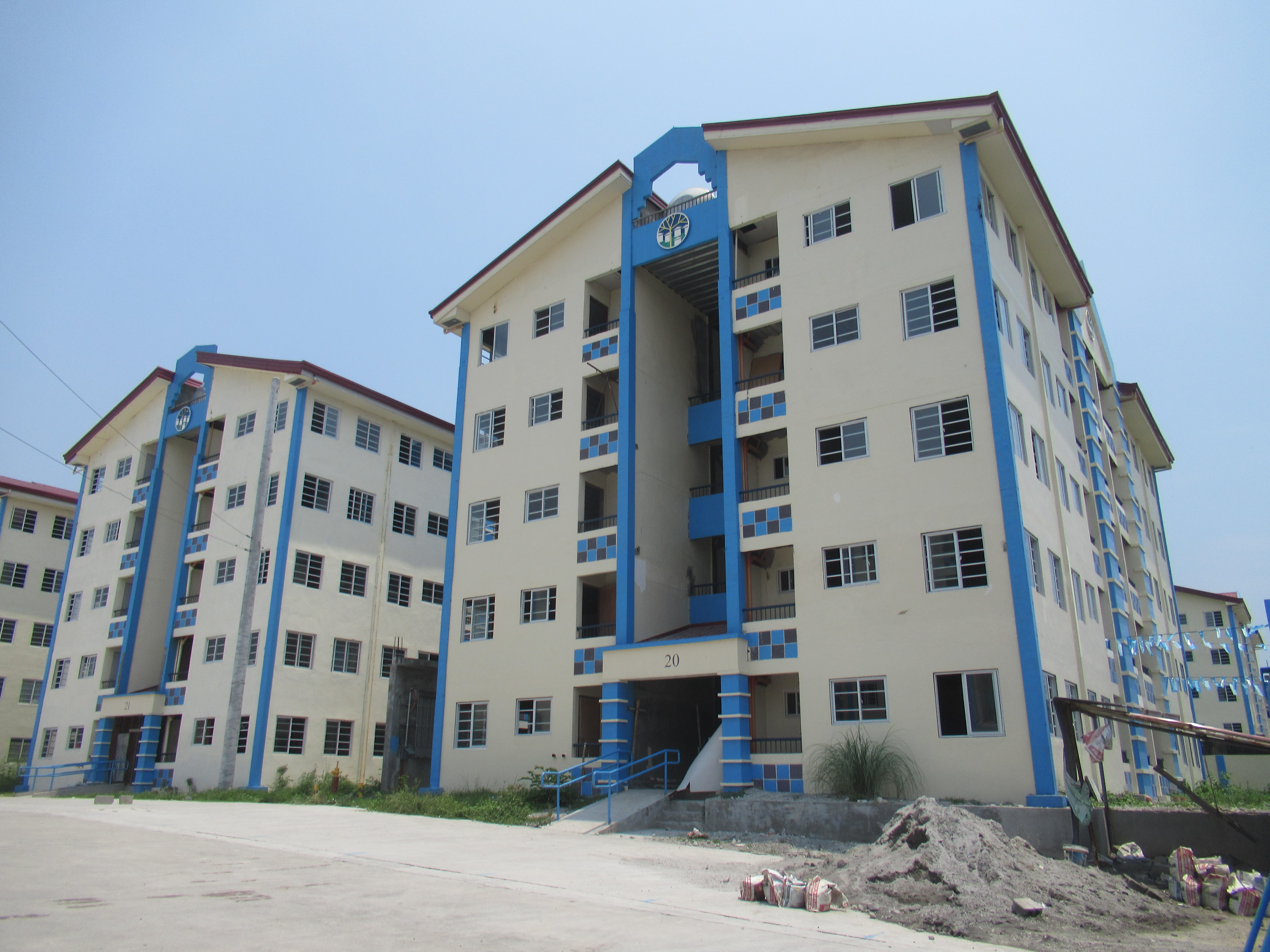
St. Gregory Housing in Panghulo, Malabon, one of the administration's housing projects

The Marcos administration aims to build 1 million housing units annually to address the country's backlog of 6.5 million housing units. Twenty-eight local government units (LGUs) have signed a memorandum of understanding with the DHSUD to pursue housing projects; 11 of them are in the construction stage. As of April 19, 2023, about 1.2-1.3 million housing sites have been started since Marcos assumed office. By February 2025, there are 56 housing projects in various stages of development and construction.

==== Transportation ====
The Marcos administration promised to improve the transportation system of the Philippines and said it will pursue more projects. Marcos pursued the Public Utility Vehicle Modernization Program (PUVMP), which will phase out old traditional jeepneys and replace them with modern public utility vehicles; it resulted in a weeklong nationwide transport strike in March 2023, forcing Marcos to order the government to review the PUVMP "to ensure that everything is taken into consideration under the program, including the grievances of our drivers and operators".

In July 2022, former Finance Secretary Carlos Dominguez III canceled the loan applications for three China-funded railway projects—the PNR South Long Haul, Subic–Clark Railway, and the Mindanao Railway (Tagum–Davao–Digos)—due to China's inaction on funding requests by the Duterte administration during Duterte's tenure. A month later, the Marcos administration resumed talks with China to renegotiate and "resume" the major railway projects, with the Department of Transportation (DOTr) citing that the funding will "strengthen bilateral relations and enhance the partnership between the Philippines and China".

On July 1, 2022, a day after his inauguration, Marcos signed a memorandum seeking to provide free train rides to students, and extend the free EDSA Carousel rides until December 2022. Shortly after, the free train rides for students was recalibrated and limited only to LRT-2; the DOTr said that train fares were "already heavily subsidized", especially when free train rides were implemented at MRT-3 for three months during the Duterte administration, and that Line 2 has the highest number of student ridership.

In August 2022, the Land Transportation Franchising and Regulatory Board (LTFRB) started reopening several pre-pandemic public utility vehicle routes in Metro Manila in preparation for the full resumption of face-to-face classes.

In June 2025, Marcos ordered the postponement of the planned rehabilitation of EDSA, one of Metro Manila's primary thoroughfares, to allow for a review of the project's implementation processes. This decision came shortly after Transportation Secretary Vince Dizon had announced that the ₱8.7 billion (US$156 million) overhaul—intended to improve road surfaces, pedestrian walkways, and drainage systems—would begin on June 13. As part of the traffic management strategy during construction, the DOTr had proposed toll-free access to segments of Skyway Stage 3 and the enforcement of an odd-even number coding scheme along EDSA. Marcos' directive paused what would have been the first large-scale renovation of EDSA in over four decades.

==== Flood control ====
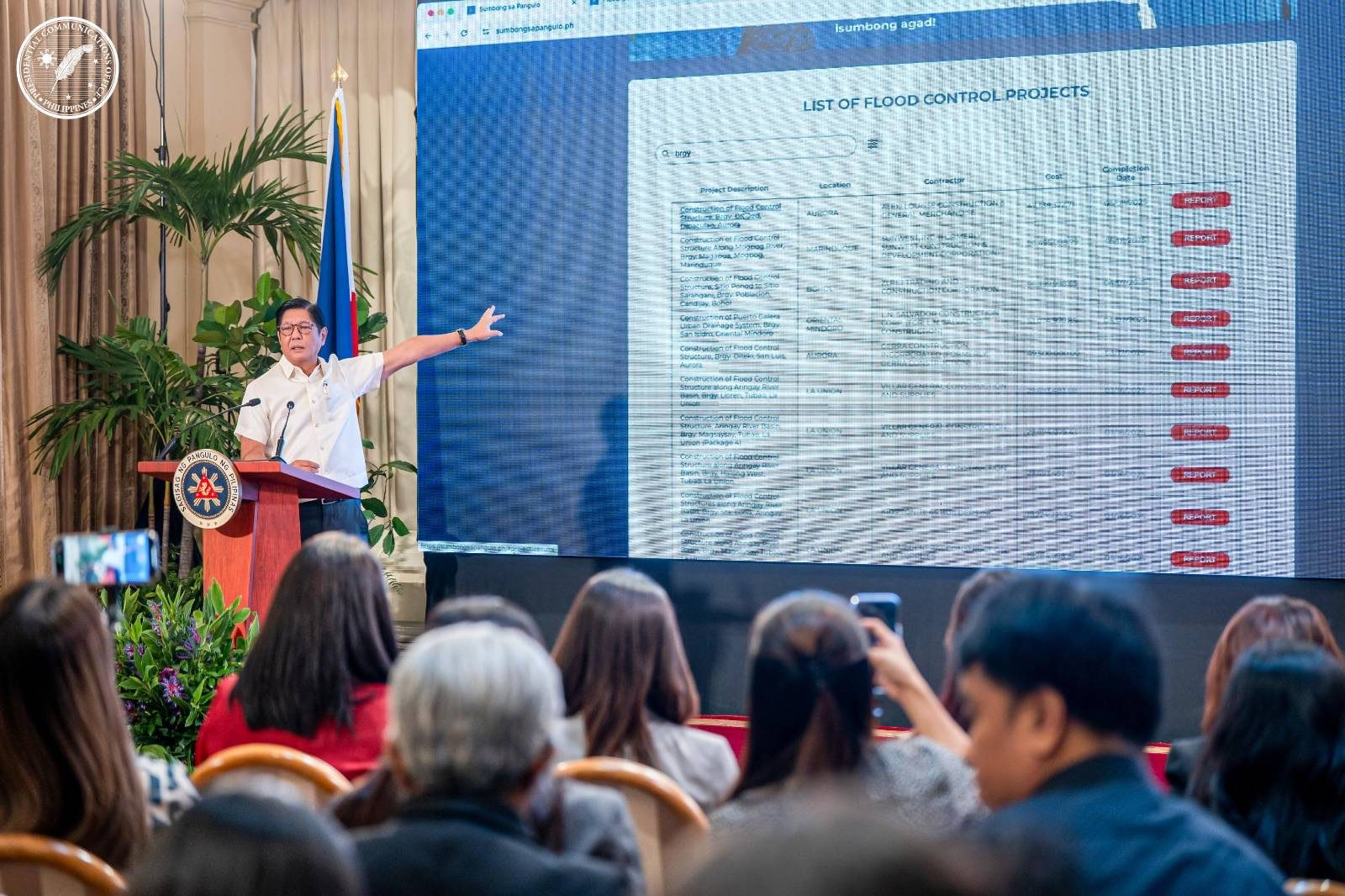
President Bongbong Marcos exposing on August 11, 2025, that 15 contractors accounted for ₱100 billion (US$2.03 billion), equivalent to 20% of all flood control projects over the past three years.

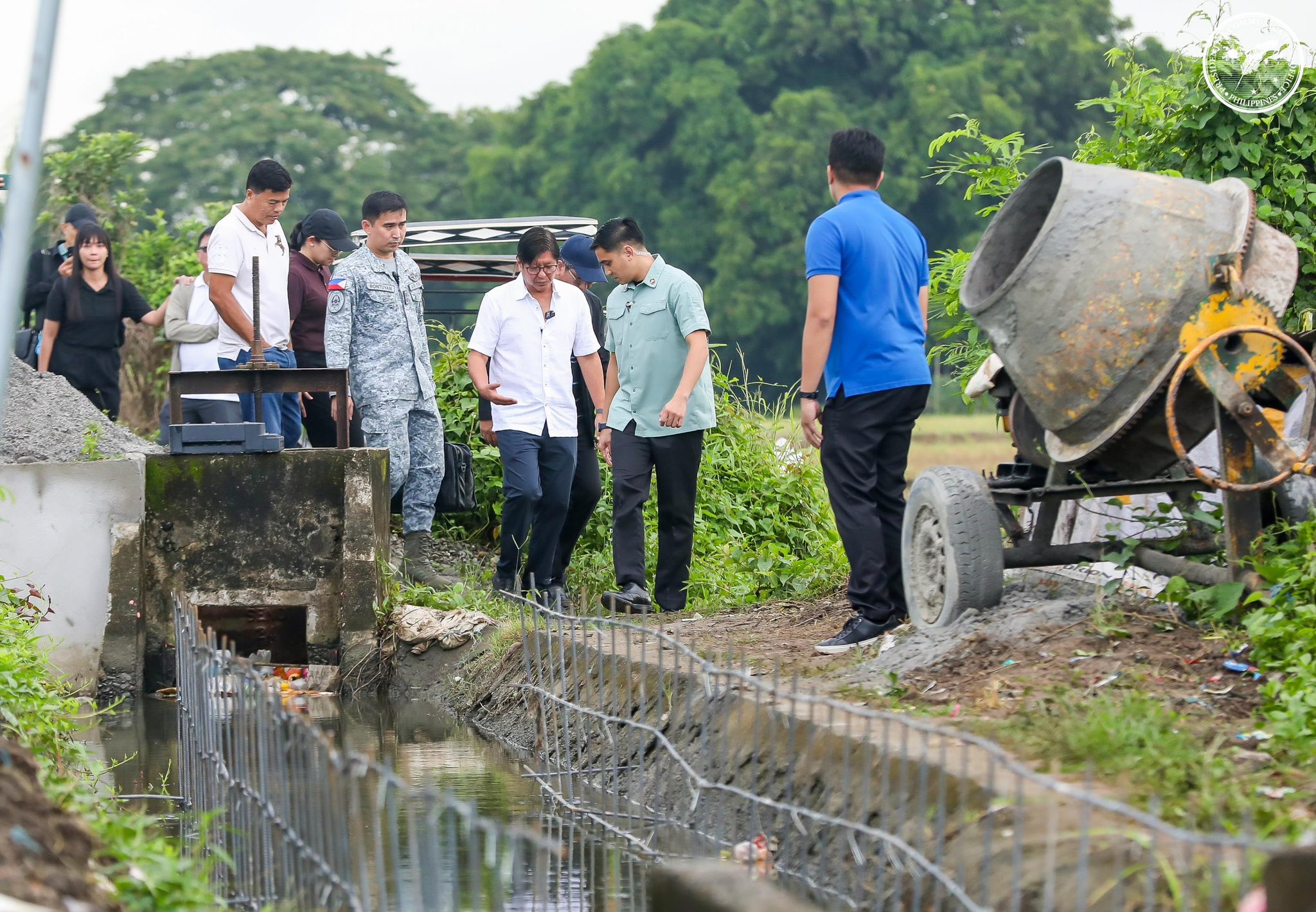
President Bongbong Marcos (third from right) surveying an unfinished flood control project site in Baliwag, Bulacan, on August 20, 2025.

During his Third State of the Nation Address in July 2024, President Marcos touted his administration's implementation of more than 5500 flood control projects in the Philippines, adding the promise to initiate ten additional large-scale projects for the next 13 years that will cost more than ₱500 billion. However, due to the floods caused by Typhoon Carina (Gaemi) and the southwest monsoon (habagat) in the succeeding days, his administration was heavily criticized for the perceived failures of the flood control projects, with the Department of Public Works and Highways (DPWH) later admitting that the projects were largely for "immediate relief" while its other major projects encountered delays. The agency also cited improper garbage disposal as among the major factors for floods in Metro Manila. In preparing the national budget for 2025, President Marcos vetoed several flood control projects, mostly from Central Luzon and Cagayan Valley, that would have cost ₱16.7 billion.

According to Senator Erwin Tulfo, Marcos sacked a wealthy DPWH Undersecretary for alleged corruption. The alleged dismissal of the undersecretary, whom Tulfo himself had declined to name, came after Marcos held his Fourth State of the Nation Address where he denounced officials who have been profiting from flood control programs. Undersecretary Roberto R. Bernardo, however, denied that he was removed by the president due to corruption, explaining that he had simply gone on a three-month medical leave to treat his spinal condition.

Marcos established the Independent Commission for Infrastructure (ICI) in September 2025 to investigate corruption allegations relating to the country's public works projects. Baguio Mayor Benjamin Magalong resigned from the ICI in September and former DPWH Secretary Rogelio Singson resigned in December. On December 17, 2025, Bagong Alyansang Makabayan (BAYAN) said that the Independent Commission on Infrastructure has excluded the president in its probe, noting how the commission has failed to charge the Marcos government for its pork barrel funds, budget insertions, and alleged kickbacks.

=== Insurgency ===
To harmonize the Bangsamoro peace agreements of the 1976 Tripoli Agreement, the 1996 Final Peace Agreement and the 2014 Comprehensive Agreement on the Bangsamoro, the Office of the Presidential Adviser on Peace, Reconciliation and Unity facilitated the participation of the Moro National Liberation Front (MNLF) in the Bangsamoro Transition Authority (BTA). On August 14, 2022, Marcos appointed new members of the BTA, and included Abdulkarim Misuari and Nurrheda Misuari, son and daughter of Moro National Liberation Front leader Nur Misuari, in an effort to unite former warring members of the MNLF and the Moro Islamic Liberation Front under one Bangsamoro autonomous government.

==== Communist policy ====
Amid the weakening of the communist fronts by the military, in May 2023, Marcos directed the "recalibration" of the NTF-ELCAC, an anti-insurgency task force, to shift its previous "aggressive" policy and become "bringers of peace". Marcos appointed Vice President Sara Duterte as co-vice chair of the NTF-ELCAC. As part of his administration's peace initiatives, in November 2023, Marcos granted amnesty to former rebels of the Communist Party of the Philippines-New People's Army-National Democratic Front (CPP-NPA-NDF), Moro Islamic Liberation Front (MILF), and Moro National Liberation Front (MNLF); he also granted amnesty to members of the Rebolusyonaryong Partido ng Manggagawa ng Pilipinas/Revolutionary Proletarian Army/Alex Boncayao Brigade (RPMP-RPA-ABB).

In a reversal of Duterte's policy, the Marcos administration and the NDF issued a joint statement on November 28, 2023, announcing the revival of peace talks between the two parties, with the government side to be led by retired general Emmanuel Bautista and Special Presidential Assistant Antonio Lagdameo and the NDF side to be led by Luis Jalandoni. Vice President Duterte asked Marcos to reconsider the plan to hold peace talks which she called an "agreement with the devil", while Speaker Martin Romualdez deemed the decision to be a "moral imperative" for the country. Negotiations between the Marcos administration and the NDF began in Oslo as early as 2022, but were withheld from the public.

After the Supreme Court ruled in May 2024 that red-tagging threatens a person's right to life, liberty, or security, Human Rights Watch and Karapatan called on Marcos to abolish the NTF-ELCAC. Marcos rejected the calls for abolition, saying the task force was instrumental in reducing the country's internal security threat. In July 2024, Duterte resigned as co-vice chairperson of NTF-ELCAC.

=== Social policies ===
On July 2, Social Welfare (DSWD) Secretary Erwin Tulfo revealed that Marcos ordered for the list of 4Ps beneficiaries to be "cleaned" due to reports of unqualified beneficiaries receiving cash grants and refusing to surrender their accounts. About 1.3 million beneficiaries identified by the social welfare department as no longer poor were to face removal from the cash assistance program, which may free ₱15 billion to be distributed to "other qualified persons". In late August, the DSWD earmarked ₱500 million to be distributed as cash assistance for poor students, prohibiting walk-ins after an initial chaotic distribution involving beneficiaries gathering in huge crowds at the central and regional offices of the DSWD; by September 24, 676,922 students nationwide received cash aid, which totaled ₱1.652 billion, in the DSWD's six-week program.

On July 30, Marcos vetoed a bill granting tax exemption on poll workers' honoraria; he cited the bill will "negate the progressivity of the reforms introduced under RA 10963 or the TRAIN law".

==== Labor ====
After Kuwait suspended all types of visas issued to Filipinos in May 2023, Marcos rejected proposals to impose a total deployment ban against Kuwait, saying he did not want to "burn any bridges"; he maintained the Philippine government will continue negotiating with Kuwait to improve the situation.

==== Poverty alleviation ====
In June 2023, Marcos appointed Marcos loyalist and disbarred lawyer Larry Gadon in a newly created position, the presidential adviser on poverty alleviation, which has a monthly salary grade of ₱278,434. Gadon said his first project would be to launch "BBM: Batang Busog, Malusog", a feeding program for the youth.

=== Telecommunications ===
In 2022, the Marcos administration launched the BroadBand ng Masa Program (BBMP) to provide free WiFi connections in remote areas. To "boost government initiatives against scams committed through text and online messages", Marcos signed his first law, which mandated SIM card registration; by the end of the July 2023 deadline, a total of 113.9 million SIM cards were registered, and about 54 million unregistered mobile numbers were deactivated.

=== Tourism ===
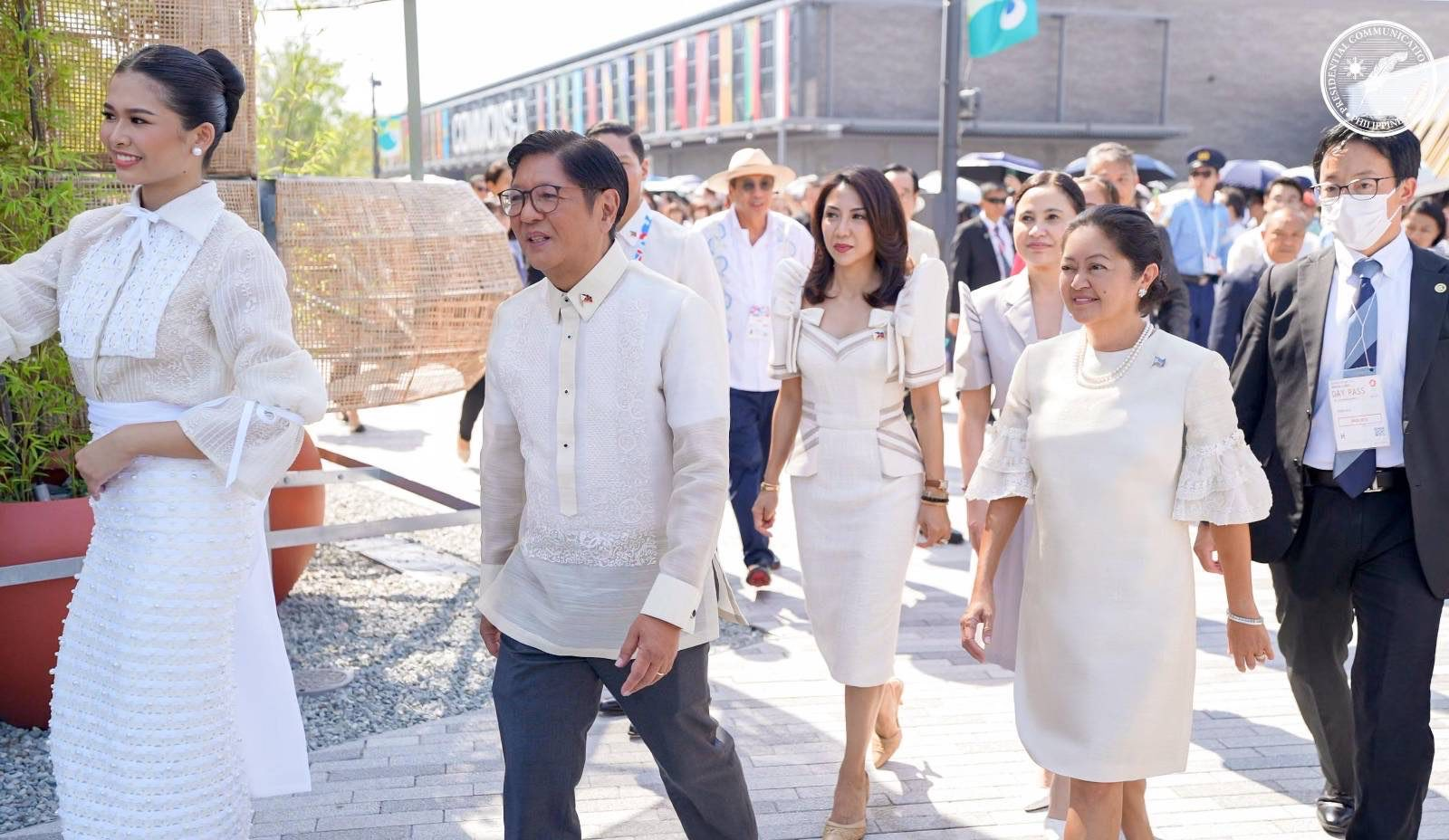
Marcos visiting the Philippine Pavilion at Expo 2025 in Osaka with First Lady Liza Araneta Marcos and then-Tourism Secretary Christina Frasco, June 21, 2025.

In June 2023, the Marcos administration's tourism department launched a new branding campaign worth ₱49 million; it included a new tourism slogan "Love the Philippines" which replaced the decade-old "It's More Fun in the Philippines". The tourism department contracted a creative agency, DDB Philippines, to produce a campaign video. A few days later, the tourism department deleted the video from its Facebook page after Agence France Presse had the video analyzed and confirmed that stock footages of places in the United Arab Emirates, Brazil, Indonesia, and Switzerland were used in the video. Shortly after, the Department of Tourism (DOT), under Secretary Christina Frasco, terminated its branding campaign contract with DDB Philippines; Frasco asserted no public funds were spent on the video, and decided to continue using the new slogan. Marcos then said he still trusts Frasco despite the stock video controversy.

In an effort to enhance the overall experience of tourists in the country, the DOT began establishing Tourist Rest Areas (TRAs) in strategic areas across the Philippines in 2022. By June 2024, about nine TRAs had been constructed by the DOT and turned over to the various local government units; at least 20 more TRAs are awaiting construction.

== Foreign affairs ==
International trips made by Marcos as president

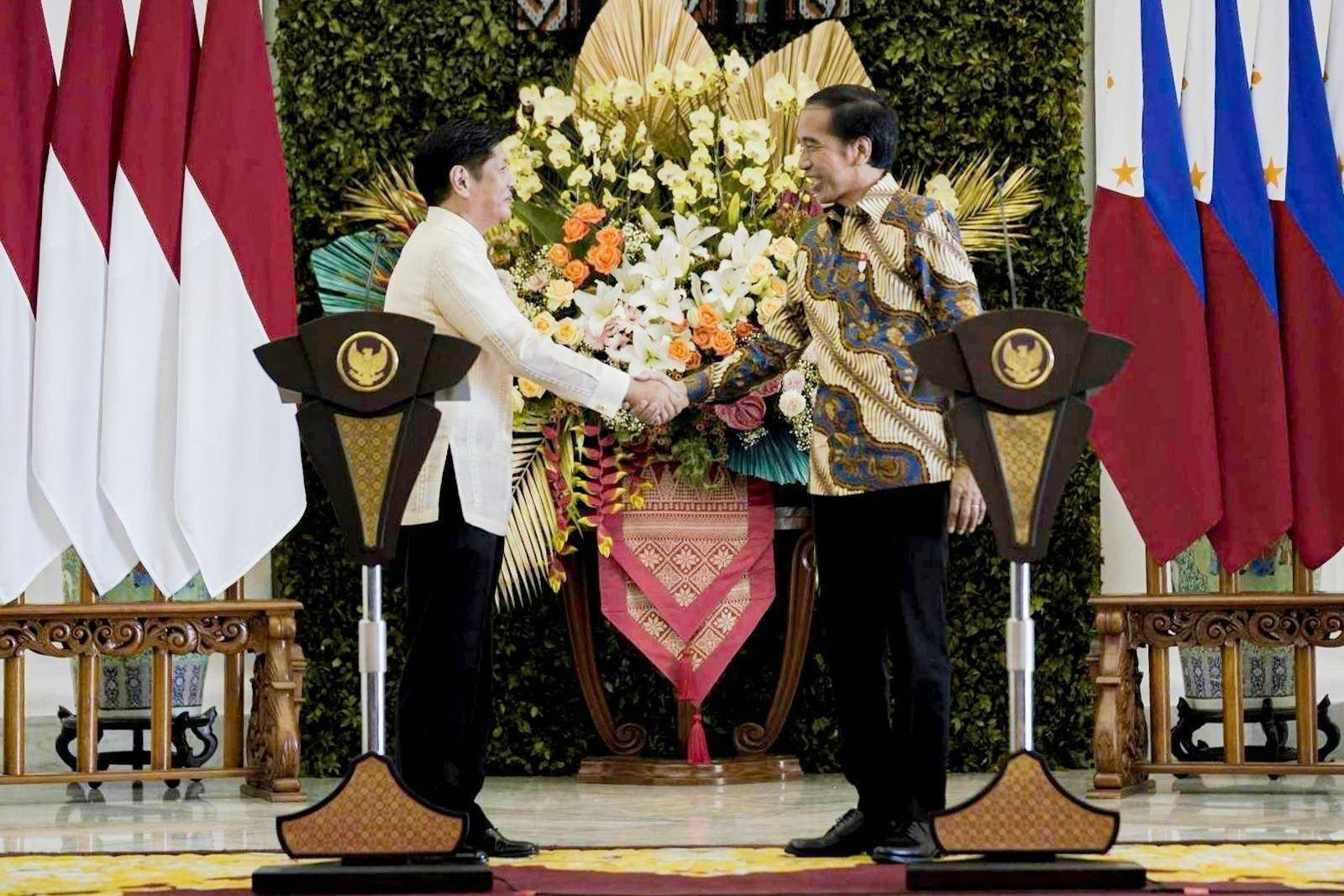
Marcos and then-Indonesian President Joko Widodo during the former's state visit in Bogor, September 5, 2022

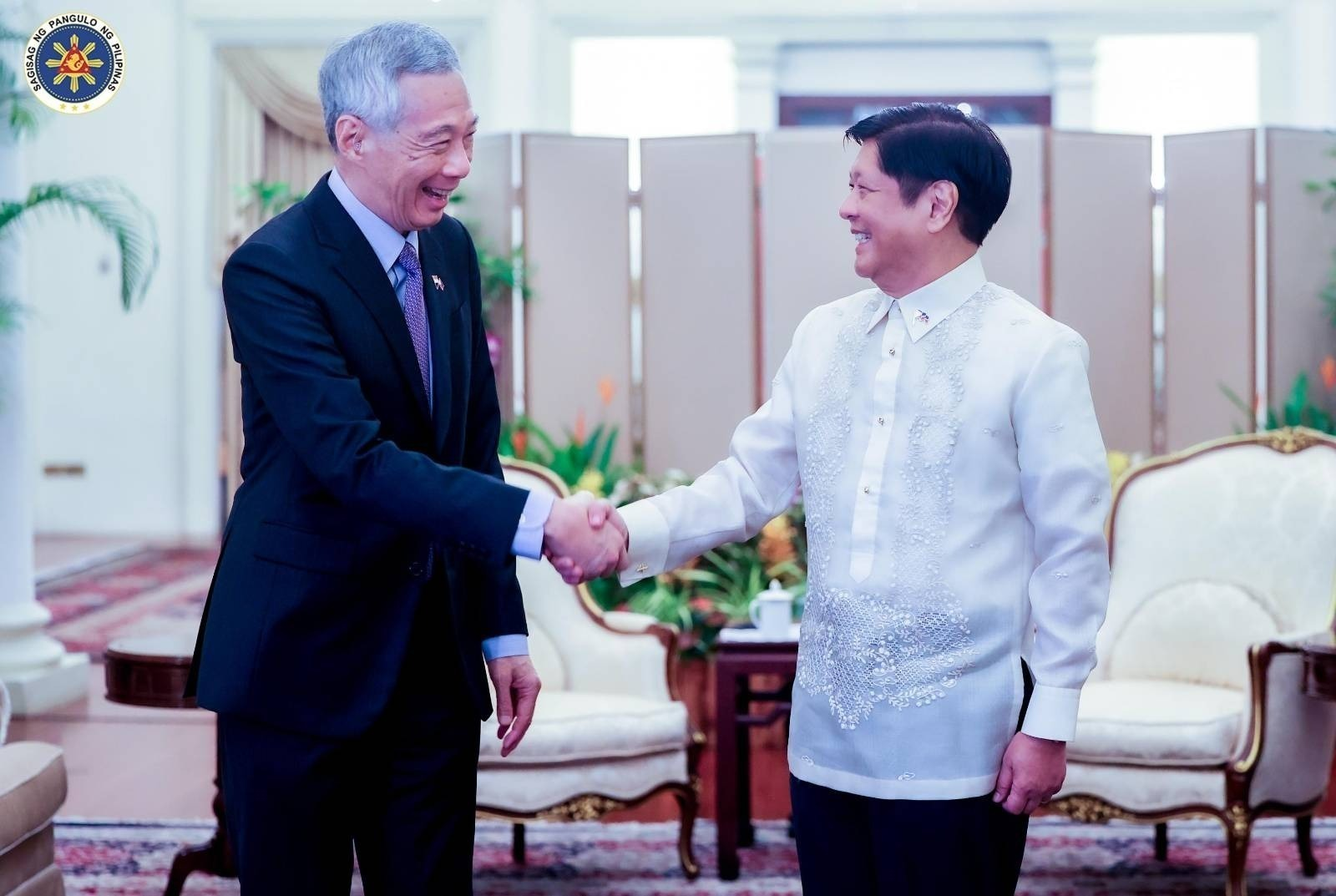
Marcos and then-Singaporean Prime Minister Lee Hsien Loong during the former's state visit in Singapore, September 7, 2022

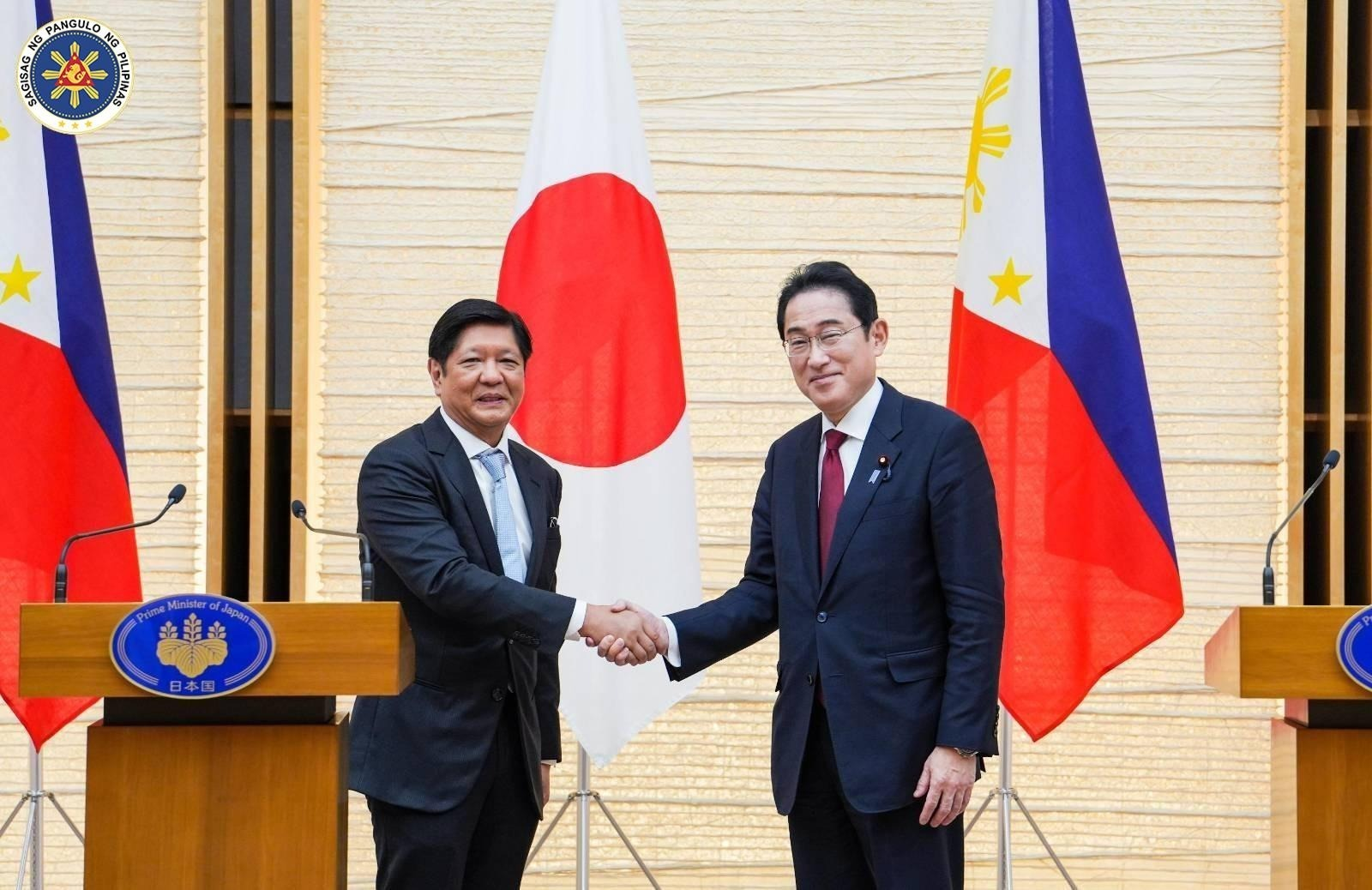
Marcos and then-Japanese Prime Minister Fumio Kishida during the former's working visit in Tokyo, February 9, 2023

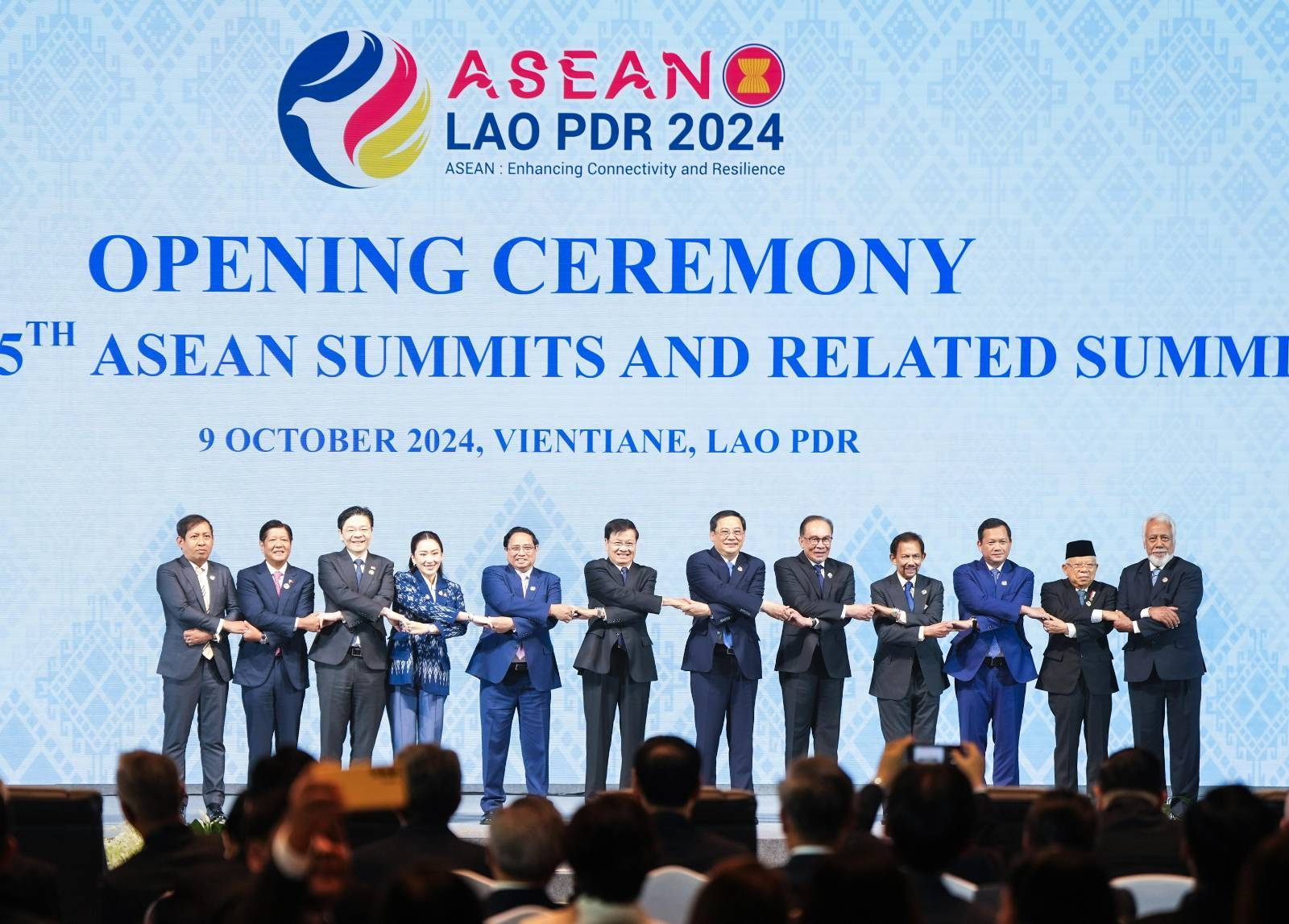
Marcos (2nd from left) and other leaders from ASEAN hold an "ASEAN-way" handshake at an ASEAN Summit in Vientiane, October 9, 2024

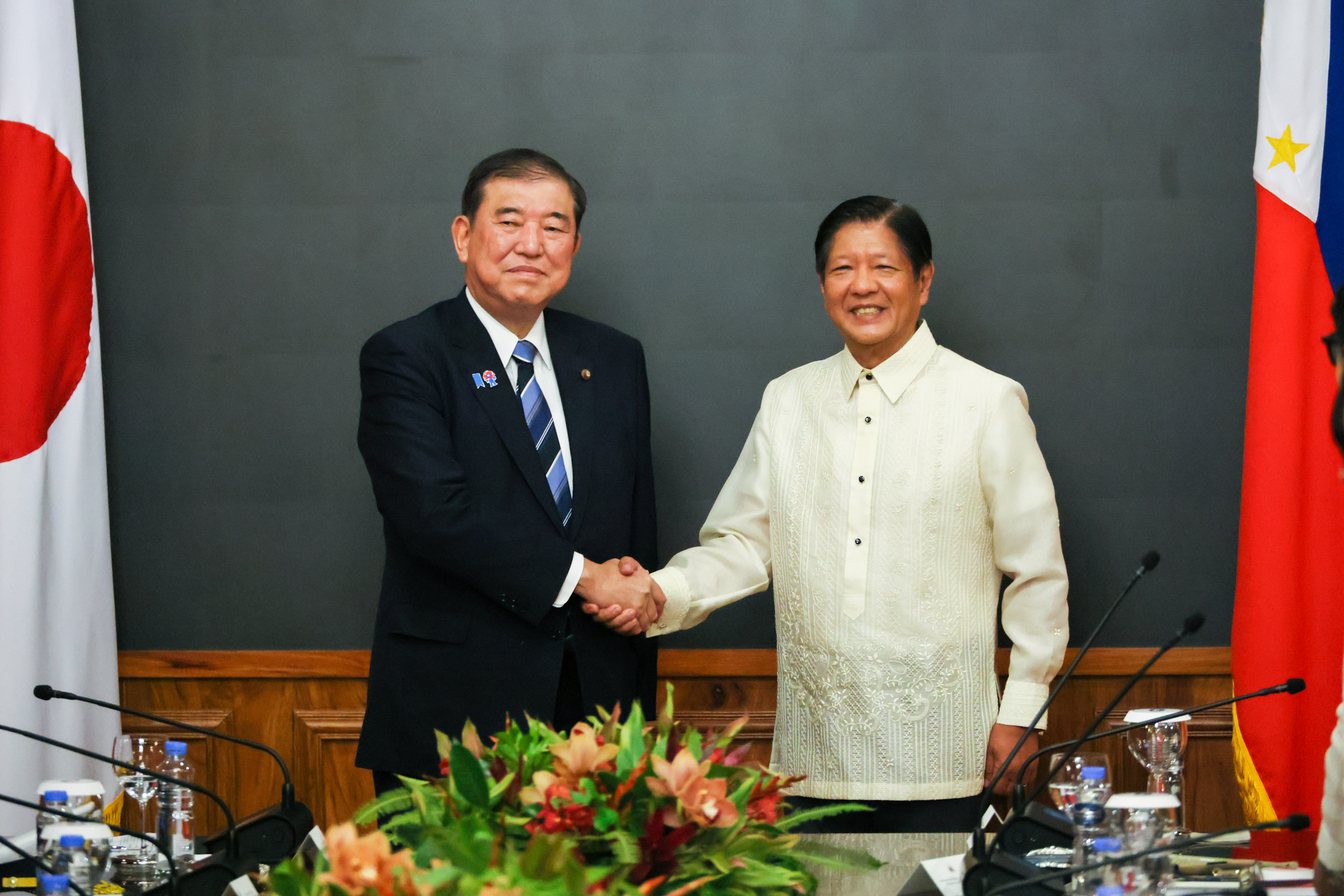
Marcos with then-Japanese Prime Minister Shigeru Ishiba during the latter's official visit at the Malacañang Palace in Manila, April 29, 2025

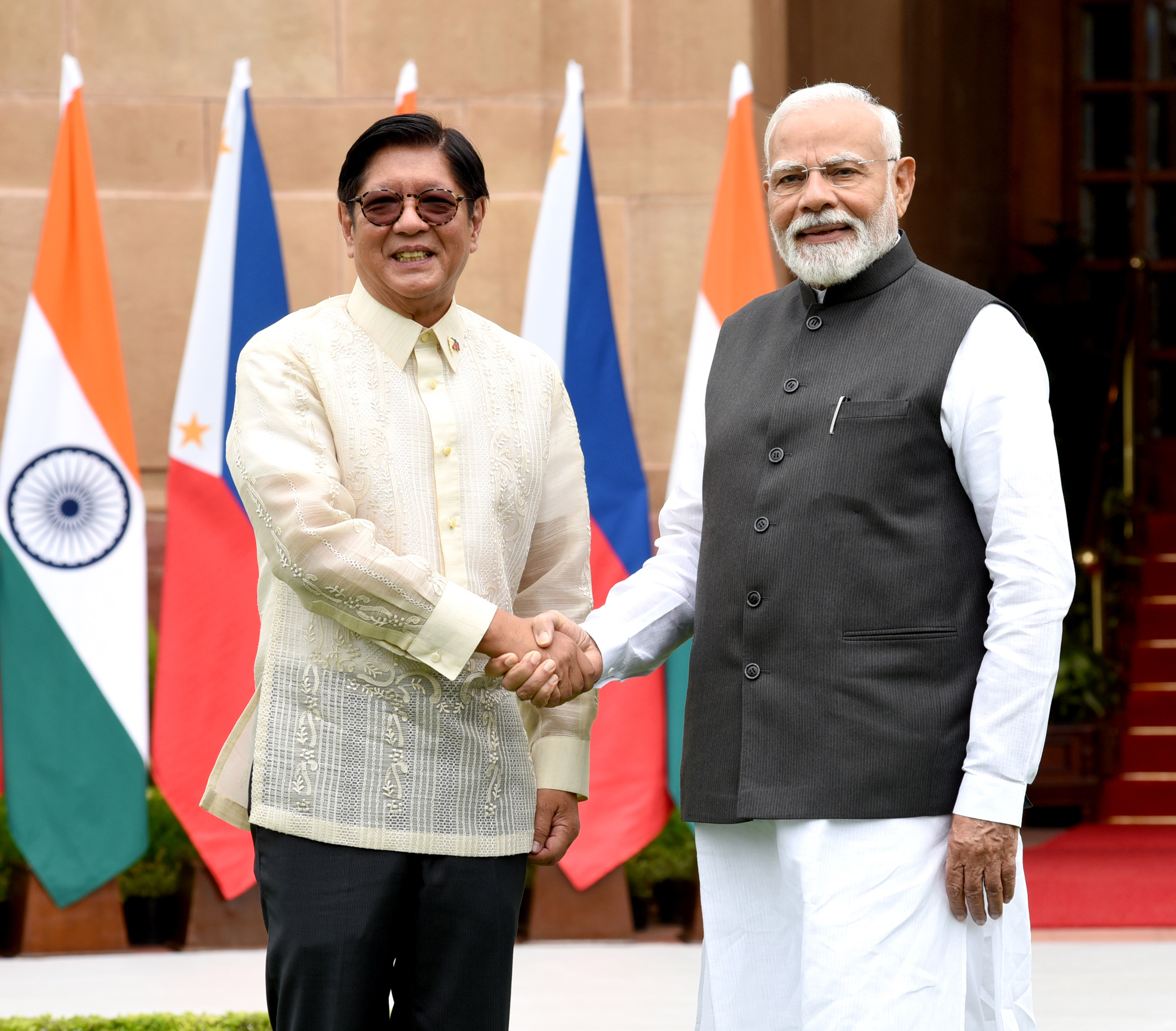
Marcos and Indian Prime Minister Narendra Modi at the Hyderabad House during the former's state visit in New Delhi, August 5, 2025

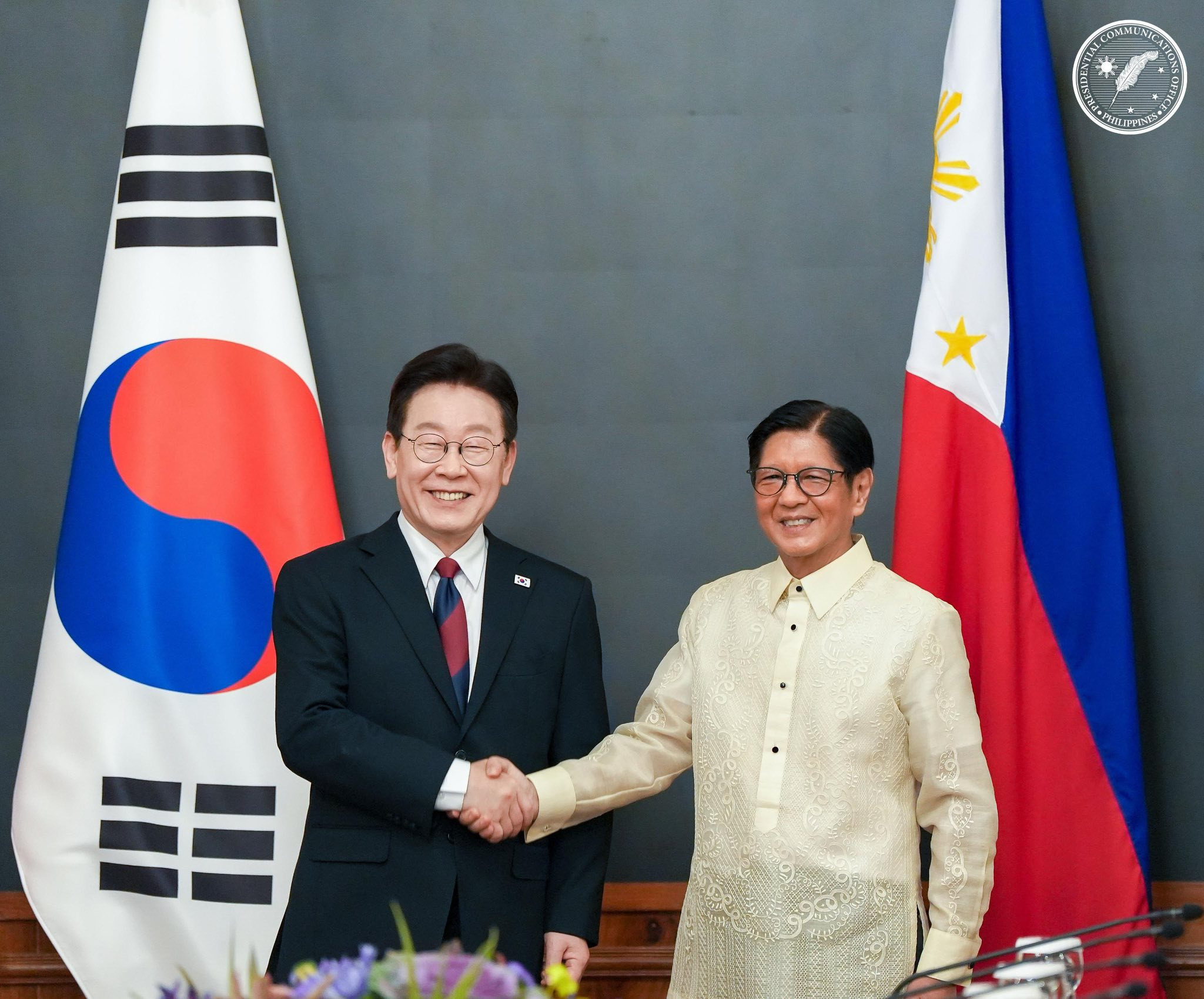
Marcos meeting with South Korean President Lee Jae Myung during the latter's state visit at the Malacañang Palace in Manila, March 3, 2026

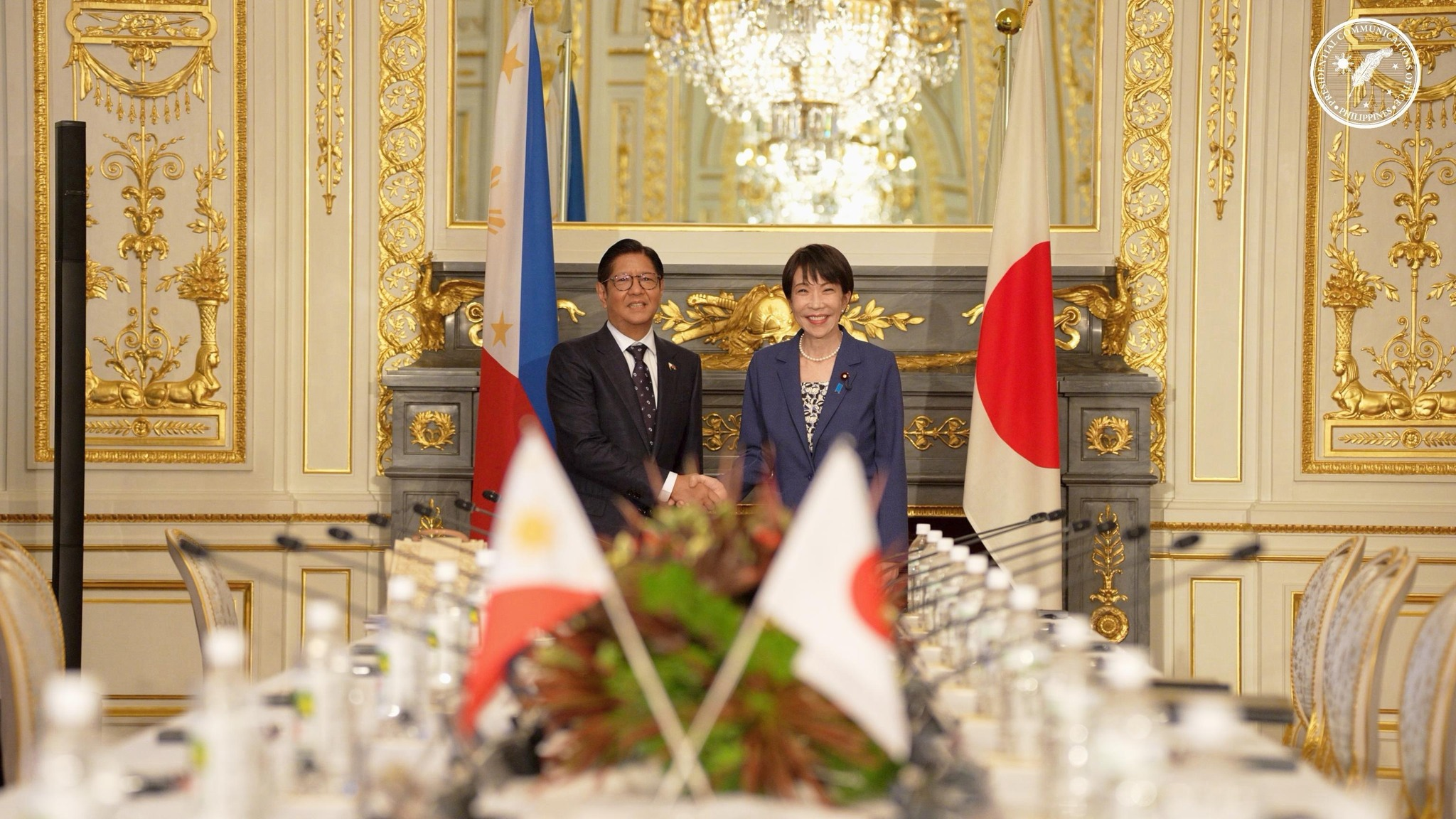
Marcos with Japanese Prime Minister Sanae Takaichi at the Akasaka Palace during the former's State Visit in Tokyo, May 28, 2026

Marcos sought to continue his predecessor, Rodrigo Duterte's "friends to all, enemies to none" approach to the Philippines' foreign policy.

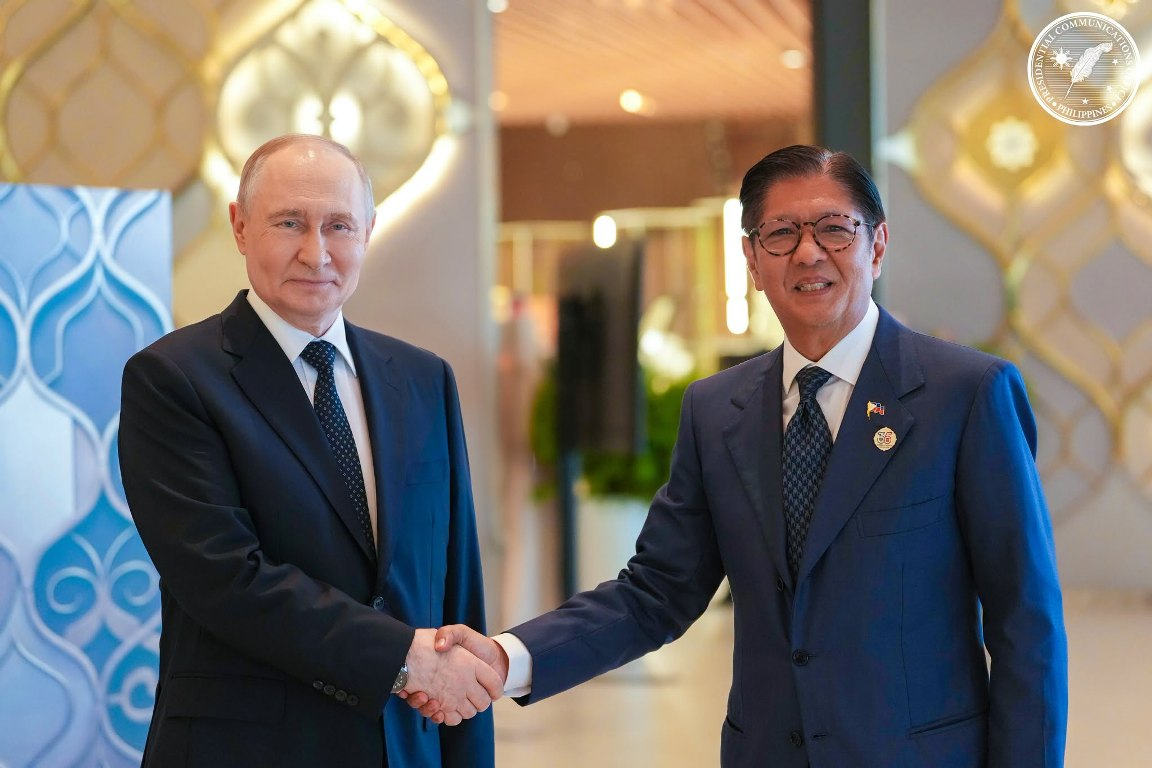
Marcos meeting with Russian President Vladimir Putin during the former's working visit at the ASEAN–Russia Commemorative Summit in Kazan, June 18, 2026

But unlike Duterte, who pursued a closer relations with China and with Russia, Marcos sought to improve both the relations with the United States and the relations with the European Union; whereas China–Philippine relations became tense.

Following a French court of arbitration's ruling instructing Malaysia to pay US$14.9 billion to the descendants of the Sulu Sultanate for breaching an international private lease agreement by not paying the cession money under the agreement since 2013, Malacañang, on August 2, said that the claim to Sabah is "not an issue of sovereignty" as it is "in the nature of a private claim".

Marcos made his inaugural state visits in Indonesia from September 4 to 6, 2022, and Singapore from September 6 to 7, securing $14.36 billion (₱804.78 billion) in investment pledges. On September 18 to 24, he made his first working visit to the United States, where he attended the 77th United Nations General Assembly and received $3.9 billion in investment pledges. Marcos was criticized upon his unannounced return to Singapore in October 1 to 2 to watch the F1 Grand Prix; Malacañang later confirmed Marcos's trip as "productive" in enjoining continued foreign investment in the country with Executive Secretary Lucas Bersamin later explaining that the visit was "partly official, partly personal".

=== China and the South China Sea ===
Upon his election as president, Marcos pledged to continue outgoing president Duterte's foreign policy of strengthening relations with China, whom he labeled the Philippines' "strongest partner." Marcos sought to resolve the territorial disputes in the South China Sea (West Philippine Sea), "through diplomacy and dialogue", further urging his fellow ASEAN leaders to complete a code of conduct for the South China Sea in accordance with the United Nations Convention on the Law of the Sea and the Declaration on the Conduct of Parties in the South China Sea signed between ASEAN and China in 2002.

While campaigning for president in January 2022, Marcos promised to "set aside" the South China Sea Arbitration in favor of direct negotiations with the Chinese government over the disputes, stating that the Permanent Court of Arbitration ruling was "no longer available" to the Philippine government because China, among many other parties, had rejected it. However, following his election in May, then-president-elect Marcos reversed his previous stance and declared he would uphold the Arbitration ruling, vowing to invoke the ruling "to assert [the Philippines'] territorial rights" if and where necessary.

While addressing the Asia Society in New York City in September 2022, Marcos made a statement that his country has "no territorial conflict with China" but rather, "China [is] claiming territory that belongs to the Philippines." He acknowledged the necessity of closer cooperation with his country's allies if the disputes escalated to war, as China's military capabilities are nearly 15 times "stronger" than the Philippines.

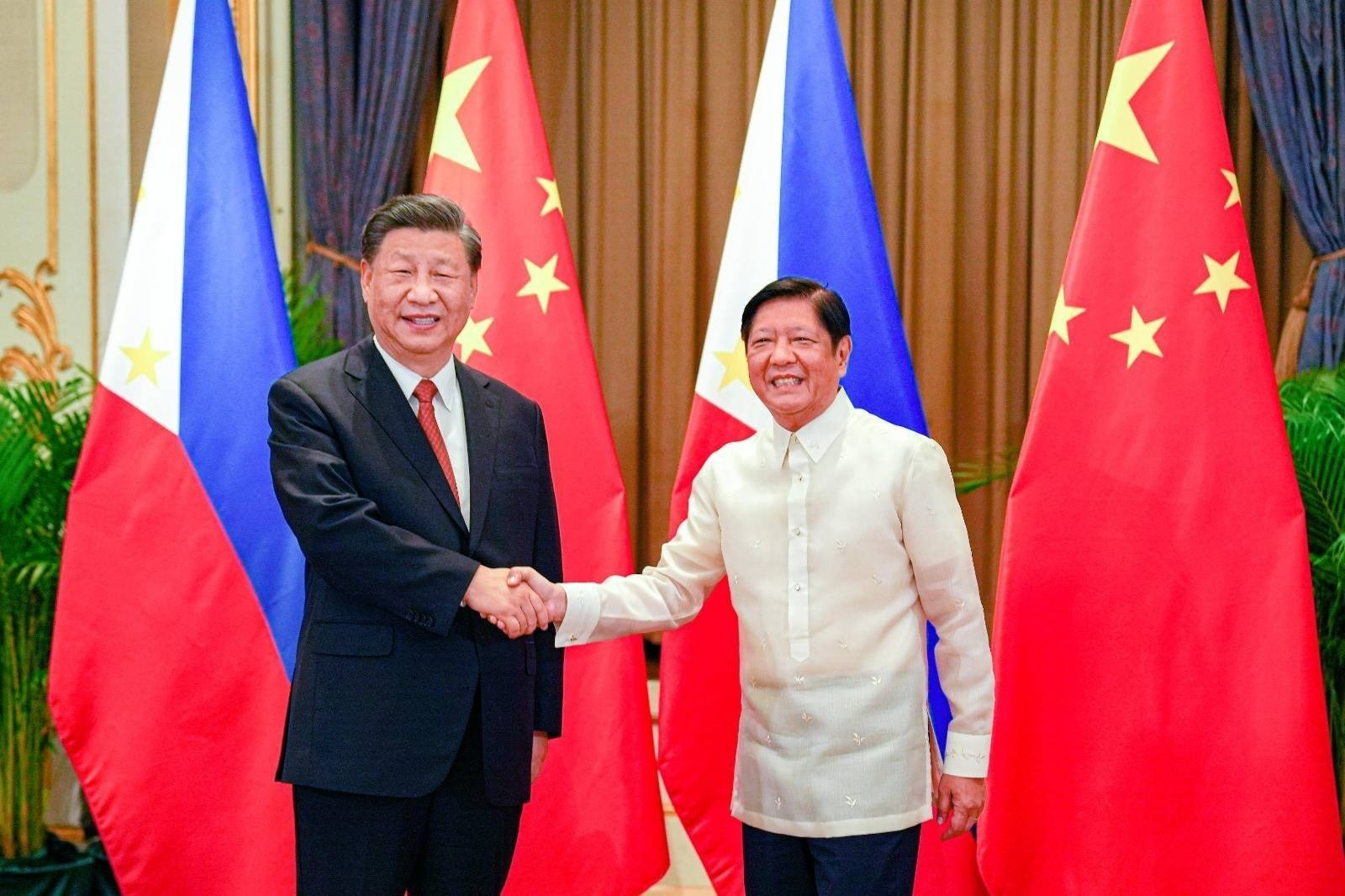
Marcos with Chinese President Xi Jinping in Bangkok, November 2022

With the Philippines making hard stance pronouncements regarding South China Sea, tensions began to rise with more clashes and ramming incidents between the Philippine forces and the Chinese Navy and coast guard. The Philippines also virtually lost control of the Sabina Shoal (Escoda Shoal) towards to China, with the latter country tightening its control on the disputed territory.

=== United States and the West ===
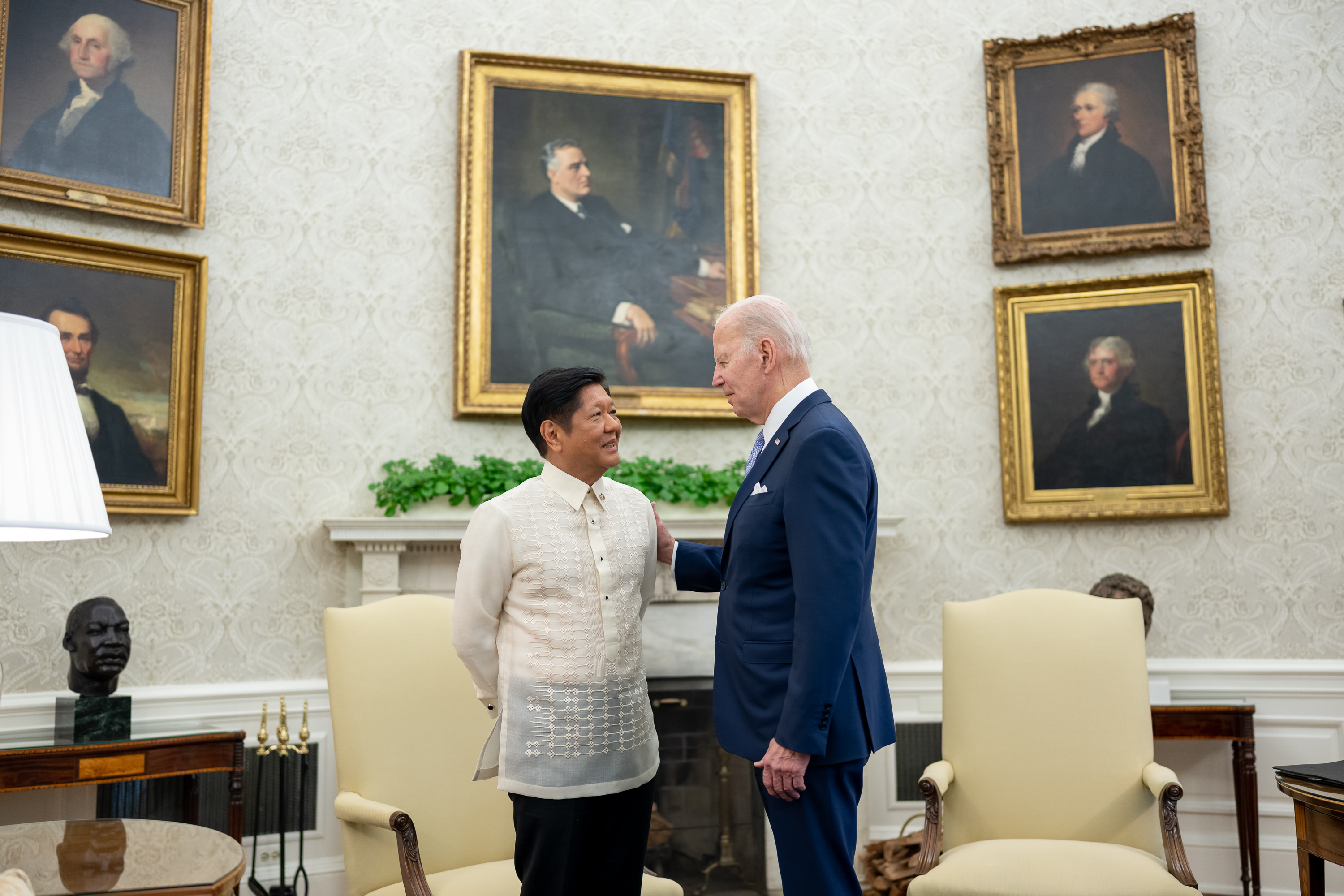
Marcos and then-U.S. President Joe Biden at the White House during the former's official visit in Washington, D.C., May 1, 2023.

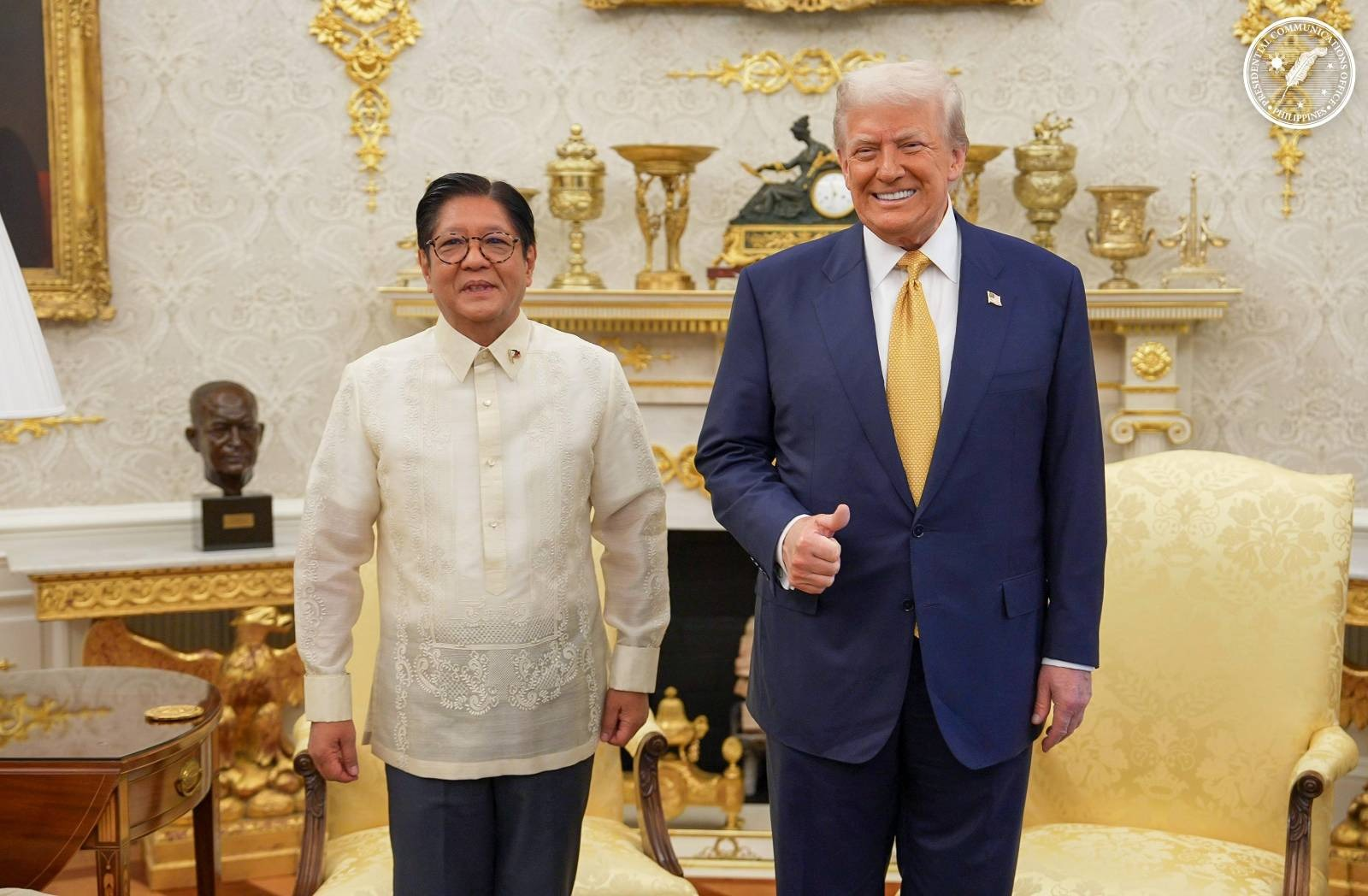
Marcos meeting with U.S. President Donald Trump at the White House during the former's official visit in Washington, D.C., July 22, 2025.

Unlike President Duterte, whose foreign policy boosted relations of the Philippines with both China and Russia, and have strained relations with the United States, Marcos restored and strengthened the Philippines' relations with its traditional ally.

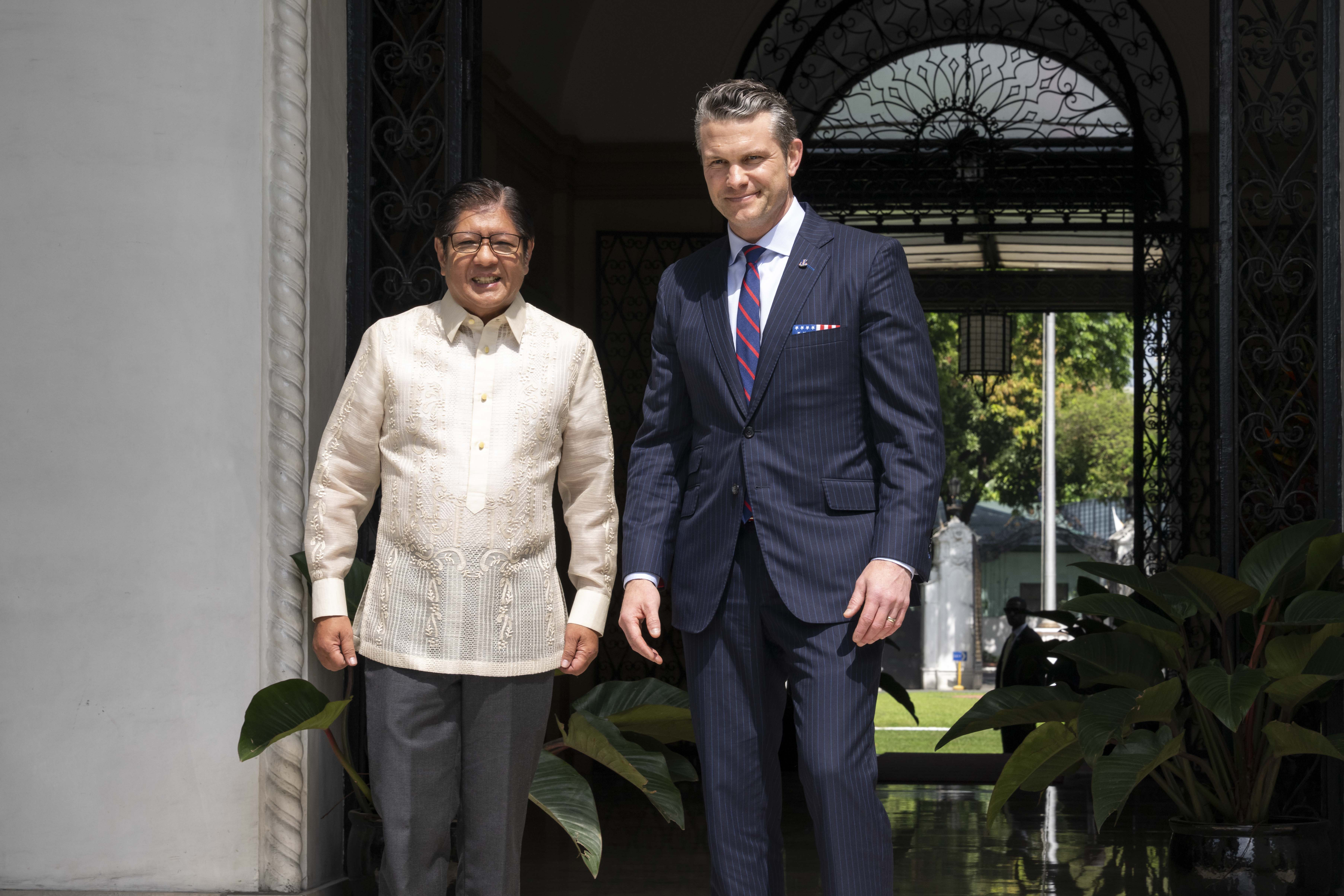
Marcos with U.S. Secretary of Defense Pete Hegseth during the latter's official visit at the Malacañang Palace in Manila, March 28, 2025.

Marcos shifted the Philippines' defense policy by approving five additional sites across the country for the Enhanced Defense Cooperation Agreement following the visit of US Defense Secretary Lloyd Austin in Manila in February 2023, risking invoking China's fury and dragging the Philippines into a US-China conflict over Taiwan.

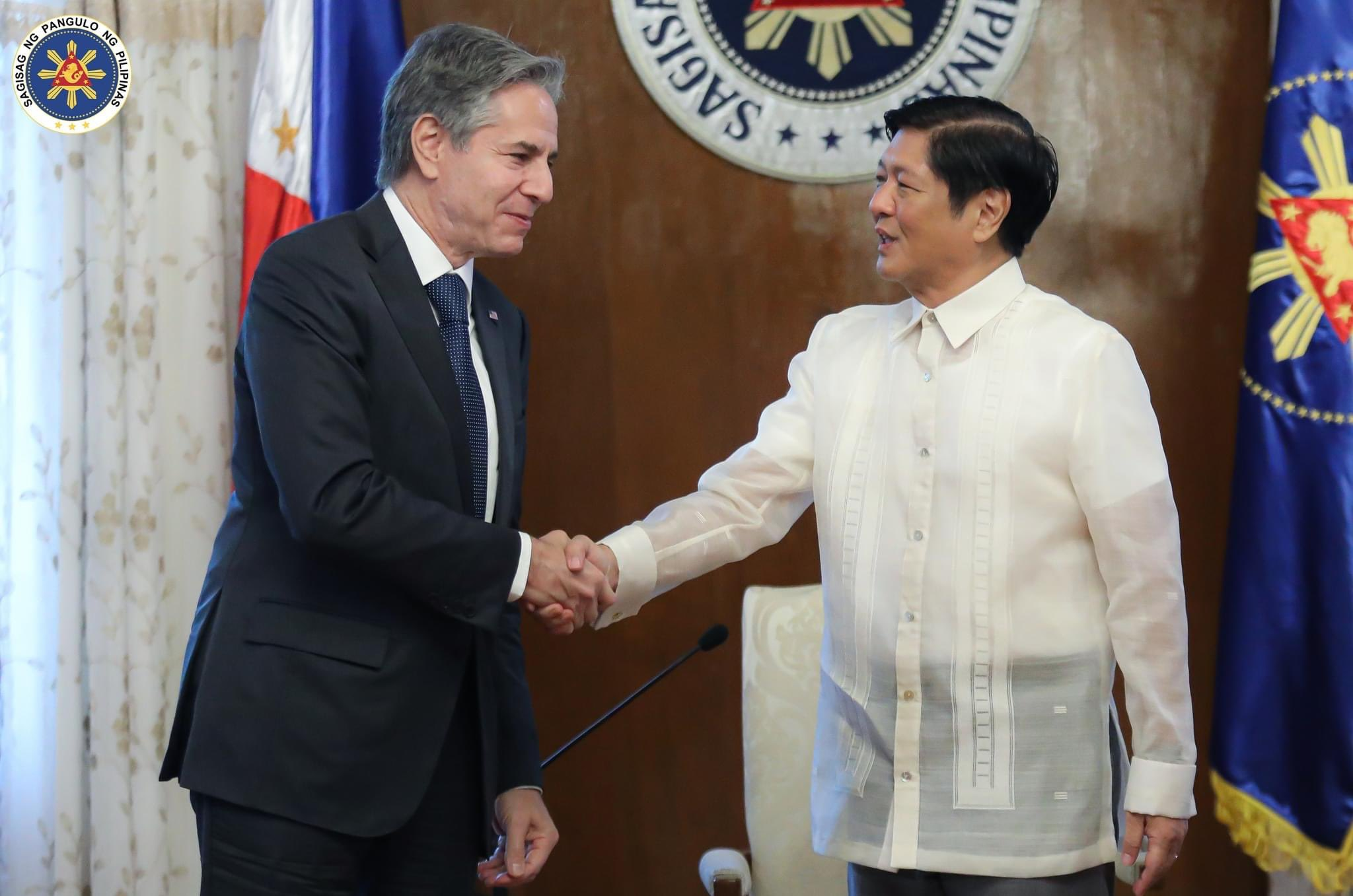
Marcos with then-U.S. Secretary of State Antony Blinken during the latter's official visit at the Malacañang Palace in Manila, August 6, 2022.

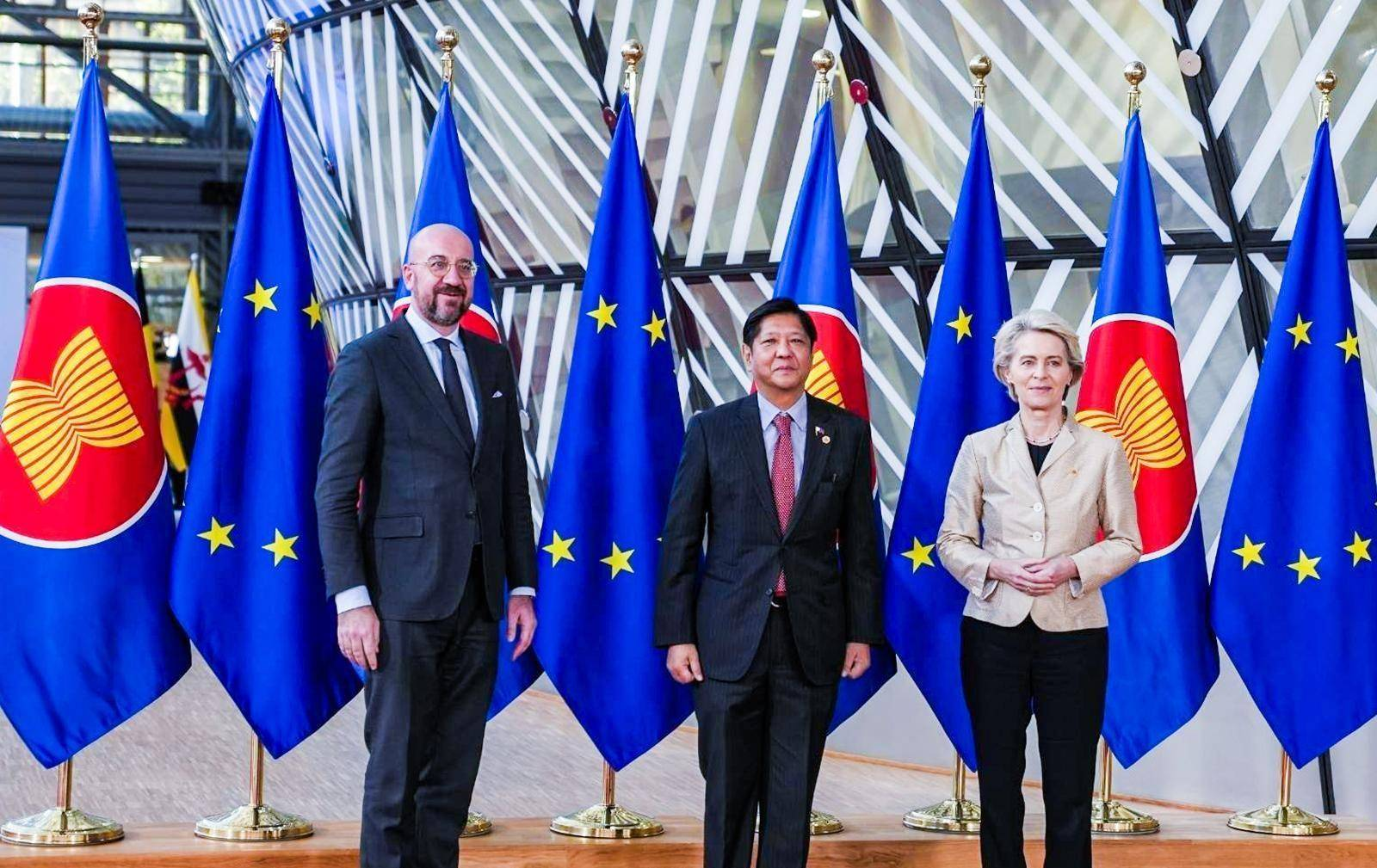
Marcos (center) with then-EU Council President Charles Michel and EU Commission President Ursula von der Leyen during the former's working visit in Brussels, December 15, 2022.

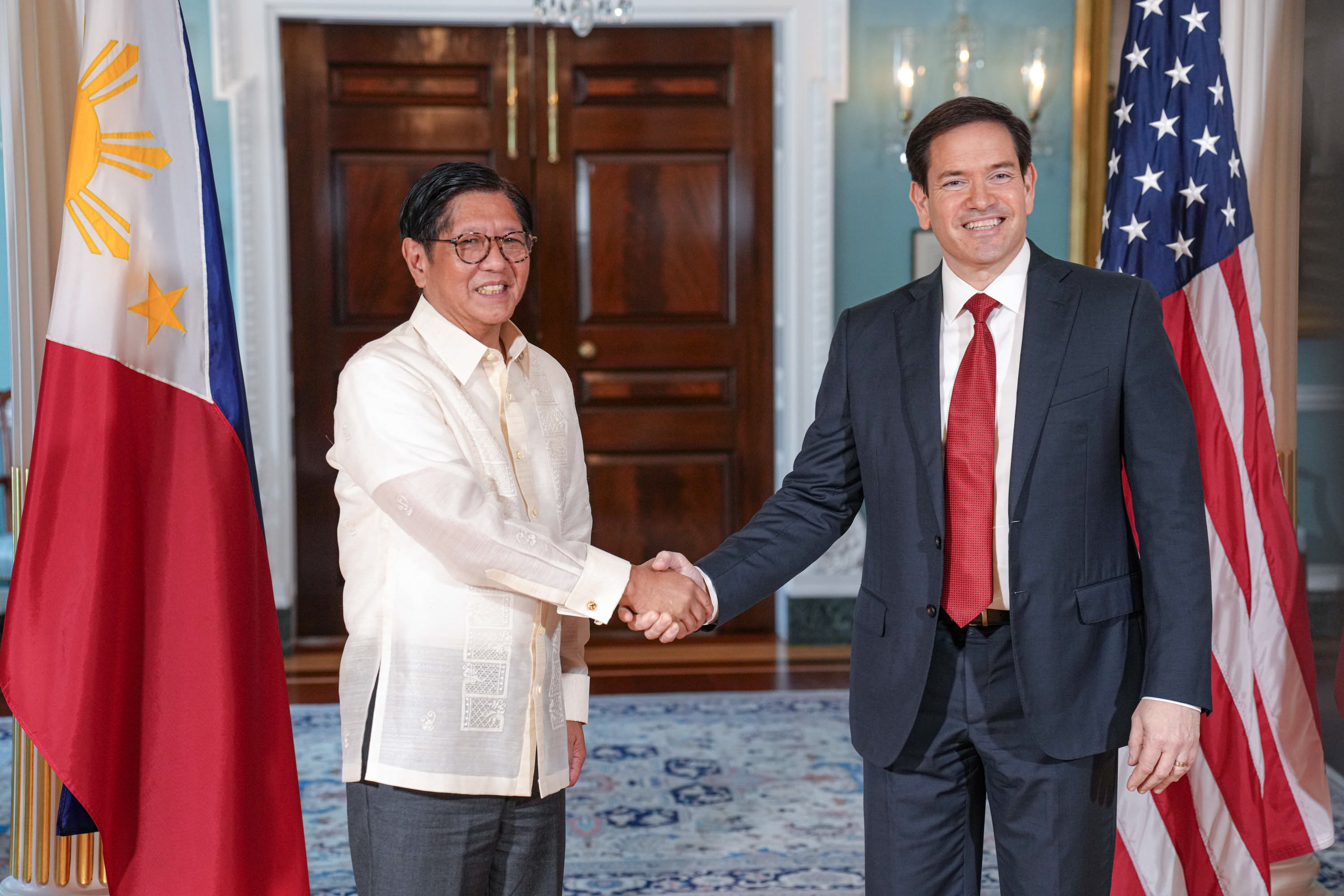
Marcos with U.S. Secretary of State Marco Rubio during the former's official visit at the Harry S Truman Building in Washington, D.C., July 21, 2025.

Amid the growing tensions between China and Taiwan, in August 2022, Marcos and United States Secretary of State Antony Blinken reaffirmed of both countries' commitment to the Mutual Defense Treaty.

=== International Criminal Court ===
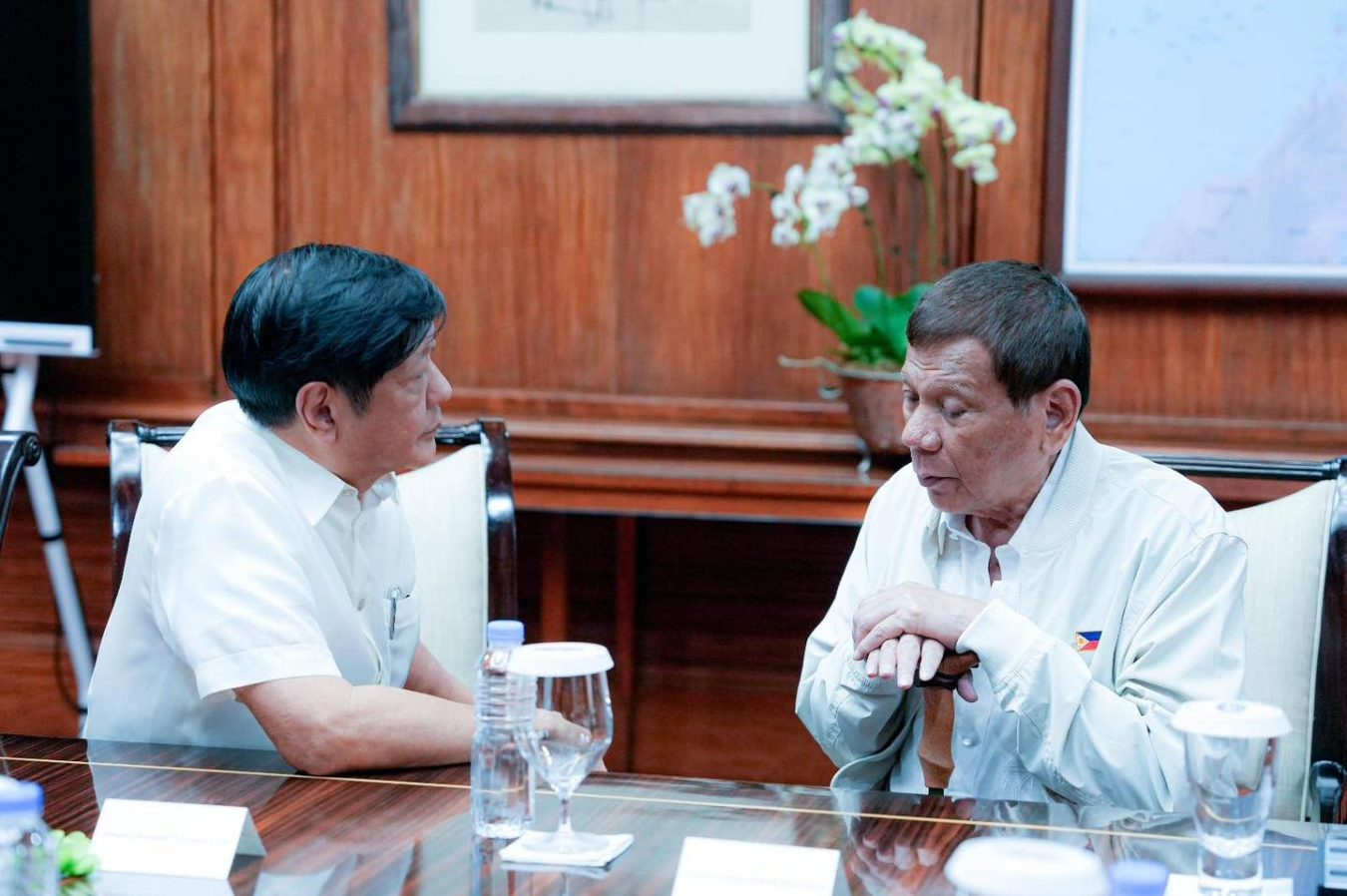
Marcos and former President Rodrigo Duterte during the latter's visit to Malacañang Palace in Manila, August 2, 2023

Marcos asserts that his administration does not intend for the Philippines to re-apply for International Criminal Court (ICC) membership following the country's withdrawal from the international tribunal under his predecessor that took effect in March 2019. In 2023, the Marcos administration submitted two separate requests in February and March to suspend the ICC's probe into the war on drugs during Duterte's presidency and the killings in the Davao area between November 2011, and June 2016; the administration argued that the Philippine government is investigating and has already investigated cases of alleged crimes against humanity, and that the ICC investigation would encroach on the Philippines' sovereignty. After the ICC rejected the Philippines' requests, Marcos, on March 28, said the Philippines is "disengaging" from any contact and communication with the ICC, saying he considers the ICC jurisdiction over the Philippines as an interference and "practically attacks on the sovereignty".

=== Russo-Ukrainian War ===
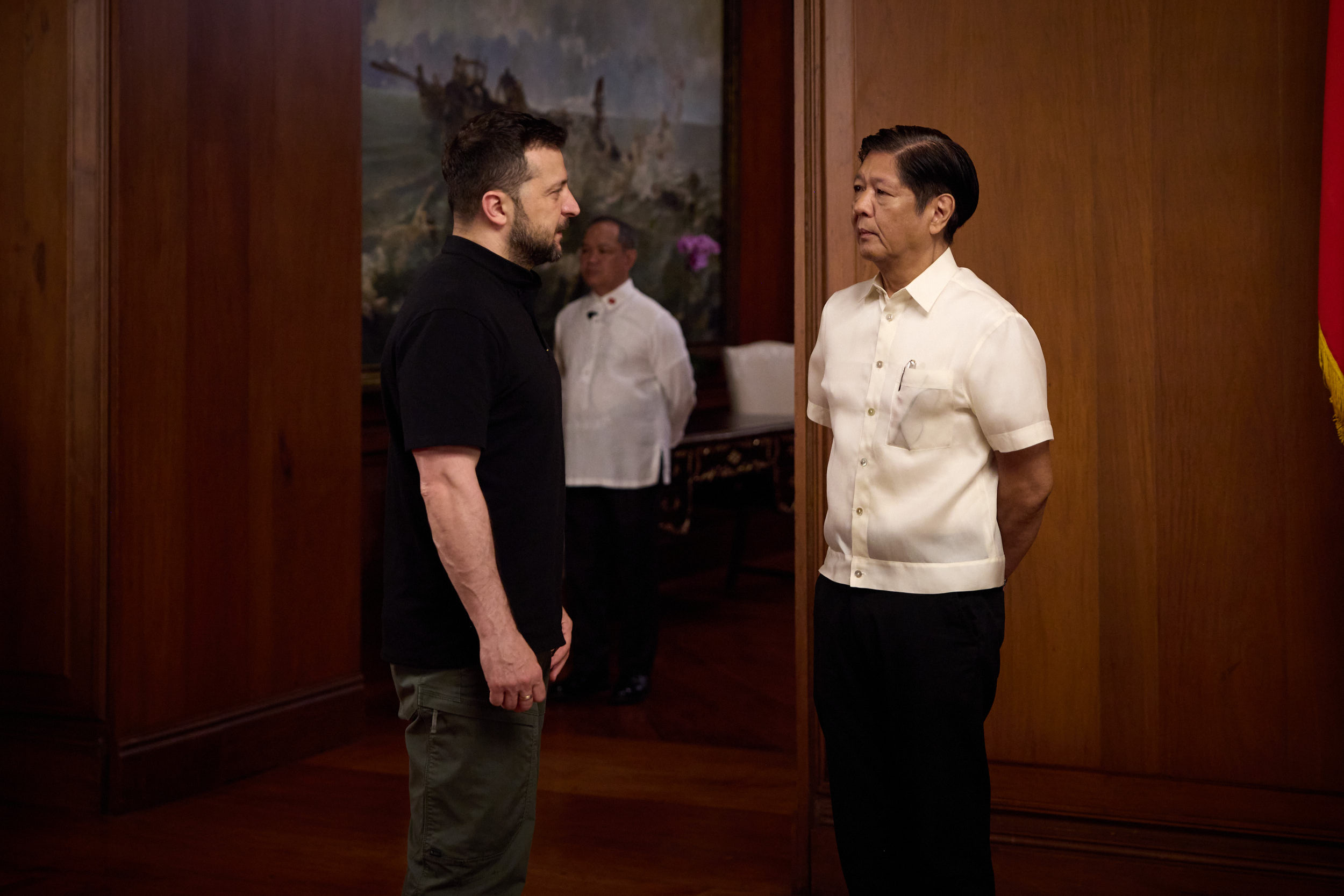
Marcos with Ukrainian President Volodymyr Zelenskyy during the latter's visit to Manila, June 3, 2024

Marcos has expressed opposition to the war between Russia and Ukraine during his presidency. In the early days of the conflict, while he was still campaigning, Marcos initially suggested there was no immediate need for the Philippines to take a stand on the Russian invasion of Ukraine. He has since called for a diplomatic resolution to the conflict, stating that the confrontation should be resolved through diplomatic channels rather than continued military engagement. Marcos cited the extensive repercussions of the war, particularly its impact on global economies and food supply chains, as reasons for his stance.

On June 3, 2024, Ukrainian President Volodymyr Zelenskyy visited Manila to invite Marcos to a peace summit in Switzerland later that month. Marcos assured Zelenskyy of Philippine participation in the summit, which the European leader said sent "a very strong signal". Following Zelenskyy's request, Marcos pledged to send mental health professionals to assist soldiers in Ukraine.

== Opinion polling ==
Opinion polling, commonly known as surveys in the Philippines, on the presidency of Bongbong Marcos has been conducted by various pollsters since the start of his tenure. The tables below show the latest polls that were administered.

Marcos began his presidency with high approval and trust ratings, but then began to decline due to numerous domestic issues such as the impeachment of Vice President Sara Duterte, arrest of former President Rodrigo Duterte, and the flood control project corruption issues.

A Pulse Asia September 2022 survey of 1,200 respondents nationwide revealed that the Marcos administration received high approval ratings on its addressing of 11 of 13 key issues in the country; calamity response and controlling the spread of COVID-19 were both rated the highest, at 78%, while performance in poverty reduction (39%) and control of inflation (31%) ranked the lowest. However, recent surveys have shown that the Marcos administration now has low approval and trust ratings.

=== Approval ratings ===
Fieldwork date(s)	Pollster	Sample size	MoE	Approve	Disapprove	Undecided/no opinion	Net
Sep 21 – 27	SWS	1,500	±3.0%	35	46	20	-11
Jun 28 – Jul 3; Jul 6	Pulse Asia	2,400	±2.0%	29	50	21	-21
Jun 20 – 29	SWS	1,200	±3.0%	38	45	17	-7
Mar 24 – 31	SWS	1,500	±3.0%	33	49	18	-15
Mar 19 – 25	OCTA	1,200	±3.0%	55	26	19	+29
Mar 10 – 17	WR Numero	1,455	±3.0%	29	47	24	-18
Feb 27 – Mar 2	Pulse Asia	1,200	±2.8%	36	45	19	-9

=== Trust ratings ===
Fieldwork date(s)	Pollster	Sample size	MoE	Trust	Distrust	Undecided/no opinion	Net
Mar 19 – 25	OCTA	1,200	±3.0%	54	30	16	+24

== Protests ==
Protests against President Bongbong Marcos have occurred mainly in the Philippines even before the inauguration of the president on June 30, 2022. Protest have been mostly conducted by progressive and opposition groups due to the violent and plunderous legacy of the Marcos family during the martial law era and throughout the rule of his father, former President Ferdinand Marcos; unpaid real-estate taxes; alleged electoral fraud during the 2022 presidential elections; instances of fake news and historical distortion; cases of human rights violations such as extrajudicial killings and the continuing war on drugs; and other social issues. Protests against the president have also included grievances against Vice President Sara Duterte as well as seeking of accountability from his predecessor Rodrigo Duterte. Mobilizations have also been held by Filipino-Americans and other solidarity and progressive groups abroad such as in the United States, Australia, and Canada.

Former President Duterte and his supporters have also organized protests against Marcos. In a "prayer rally" held in Cebu City, the former president made numerous remarks denouncing Marcos' People's Initiative and the subsequent economic constitutional amendments. During the rally, Duterte also made statements alluding to the deposal of President Marcos similar to his father yet through military force. In the same rally, Duterte called President Marcos a drug addict, Marcos responded that Duterte's use of fentanyl impaired his judgement. Duterte has since softened his position yet states that he and his coalition are no longer allies with President Marcos, reinforced by Vice President Sara Duterte stating that the UniTeam alliance was dissolved immediately after the 2022 Philippine General Election.

There were protests on how Marcos and Congress were "shamelessly fooling" people in enacting the 2025 national budget, with columnist Boo Chanco saying that "BBM could have saved the day but he connived with Congress in his token veto of P26.065 billion worth of projects under the DPWH and P168.240 billion allocated under “Unprogrammed Appropriations.” Chanco added that "not surprisingly, BBM kept intact the pork funds inserted in the DPWH budget."
