= Onion crisis =

Onion crisis may refer to:

- 2010 Indian onion crisis
- 2022–2023 Philippine onion crisis
