= 2022–2023 Philippine onion crisis =

By late 2022, the price of red and white onions in the Philippines increased significantly, reaching an all-time high in December at ₱700 per kilogram and leading people to smuggle the commodity into the country.

== Background ==
Along with garlic, onion is a staple in Filipino cuisine, being used as a base in many dishes. It is a seasonal crop, growing between the rainy months of September and December. Meanwhile, its harvest season begins as early as December and ends in June. The Philippines consumes an average of 17,000 metric tons of onion per month. In August 2022, the country was predicted to experience a shortage of onion and garlic.

The price of red onion in 2021 ranged between ₱90 and ₱120.

== Causes ==
The Department of Agriculture's failure to adequately project supply and demand for onions resulted to a delay in imports, leading to a shortage.

== Response ==
In January 2023, President Bongbong Marcos, who was also serving concurrently as Secretary of Agriculture, approved the importation of 21,060 tons of onion. The first shipments began to arrive on January 23. The agriculture department said the importation, albeit a "temporary solution", would help decrease inflation in the country and stabilize the price of the vegetable.

== See also ==
- 2010 Indian onion crisis
- 2022–2023 Philippine sugar crisis
