= 2022–2023 Philippine sugar crisis =

Sugar crisis in the Philippines

- Date: 2021–22 crop year (Note: The crop year for sugar in the Philippines lasts from September 1 to August 31. The sugar crisis was first noted during the 2021–22 crop year.) – present
- Location: Philippines
- Cause: Low production of sugar Alleged hoarding
- Participants: President Bongbong Marcos; Sugar Regulatory Administration; Philippine sugar industry traders and other stakeholders

There has been a noted shortage of supply of sugar in the domestic market of the Philippines after a poor harvest of for the 2021–22 crop year. This led to the price increase of the commodity and there has been suspicions of traders taking advantage of the situation through hoarding and/or smuggling.

A plan to import 300,000 MT of sugar through Sugar Order No. 4 was subject to controversy which led to the resignation of officials of the Sugar Regulatory Administration (SRA).

A subsequent SRA Sugar Order, specifically Sugar Order No. 6 dated February 6, 2023, also became subject of a Senate inquiry, in aid of legislation, through Senate P.S. Res. No. 497 filed on February 21, 2023 by Senator Risa Hontiveros and before the Senate Blue Ribbon Committee.

== Cause ==
=== Low output ===
Sugar Regulatory Administration (SRA) administrator Hermenegildo Serafica noted a decrease of sugar output in the Philippines for the 2021–22 crop year. Only 1.8 million metric tons (MT) was produced by June 15 in contrast to the 2.12 million MT output produced by June 13 of the 2020–21 crop year. An unusual decline of sugar production was noted for Negros according to the March 2022 to May 2022 production data. This was attributed to the onslaught of Typhoon Rai (Odette) which damaged the leaves of sugarcane plants in the island. Negros Occidental is the country's top sugar-producing province. According to the SRA's Sugar Regulatory directory, the province hosts five out of 12 active sugar refineries for the 2021–22 crop year.

The Philippines is not a regular importer of sugar and only imports whenever needed. Thailand, the second-largest producer in the world after Brazil, is the top source of imported sugar in the Philippines.

=== Hoarding ===
There are suspicions that the crisis is caused by hoarding. United Sugar Producers Federation (Unified) President Manuel Lamata, insisted that unspecified traders are engaged in "manipulation and hoarding" and claimed that there is no shortage at all.

According to Executive Secretary Vic Rodriguez, the government is investigating reports of traders lobbying for the importation of 300,000 MT of sugar so that they could use the additional sugar supply as a cover to sell their hoarded sugar.

After raids conducted in separate locations in August 2022 which yielded 10,700 MT of sugar, the Philippine government concluded that the shortage is "artificial".

=== Smuggling ===
State-sponsored sugar smuggling has also been alleged as a key cause of the Philippine sugar crisis. Senator Risa Hontiveros, through Senate P.S. Res. No. 497 filed on February 21, 2023 and before the Senate Blue Ribbon Committee, alleged that the Sugar Regulatory Administration's Sugar Order No. 6 permitted the smuggling of four hundred forty thousand (440,000) metric tons of sugar by and in favor of three (3) only three importers under terms that are contrary to law, including the Anti-Agricultural Smuggling Act.

== Impact ==
Food inflation increased as a cause of the sugar crisis. In May 2022, the overall price of consumer goods rose by 4.9%. The retail price of sugar itself had also increased.

Due to the sugar shortage, soda manufacturers Coca-Cola Beverages Philippines, Pepsi-Cola Products Philippines, and ARC Refreshments Corporation released a joint statement on August 16, 2022, that they were experiencing a supply shortage of refined sugar or bottlers' grade sugar. According to 2nd Albay district representative Joey Salceda, soda manufacturers may shift to high-fructose corn syrup if the sugar supply issue continues, which is taxed heavier under the Tax Reform for Acceleration and Inclusion (TRAIN) Law. Manufacturers as a result may increase prices of their products to compensate in an event of a shift to the more heavier taxed sweetener.

The crisis has also threatened the operations of Cebu province's oldest and only sugar milling company, Bogo-Medellin Milling Company, Inc. (Bomedco) in the town of Medellin.

Salceda warned against relying on sugar imports to alleviate the sugar crisis, pointing out that the sugar is a "political and social issue" since the industry directly employs 700,000 people. According to him, overreliance on imports might affect the livelihood of these people.

Average retail sugar prices in Metro Manila per kilogram
Crop Year	Date	Market	Raw	Washed	Refined	Ref.
2020–21	August 18, 2021	Supermarkets / groceries	₱46.99	₱50.81	₱54.46	
2020–21	August 18, 2021	Public wet markets	₱45.36	₱46.43	₱53.00	
2021–22	August 18, 2022	Supermarkets / groceries	₱74.11	₱77.05	₱99.38	
2021–22	August 18, 2022	Public wet markets	₱72.43	₱74.64	₱97.21	

== Response ==
=== Unauthorized Sugar Order No. 4 ===
Sugar Order (SO) No. 4 was released by the Sugar Regulatory Administration (SRA) on August 9, 2022, which directed the importation of 300,000 MT of sugar to the Philippines. It was intended to "fill the gap in production". The order was signed by SRA administrator Hermenegildo Serafica, and board members Roland Beltran (miller's representative) and Aurelio Gerardo Valderrama Jr. (planters' representative). Agriculture undersecretary Leocadio Sebastian also signed the order in behalf of President Bongbong Marcos, who also concurrently serves as SRA chairman and agriculture secretary.

However, Press Secretary Trixie Cruz-Angeles released a statement that President Marcos did not authorize or sign the order. SRA administrator Serafica resigned on August 10, 2022, over Sugar Order No. 4 (SO 4) which was approved by President Marcos and publicized six days later. Agriculture undersecretary Sebastian, and SRA board member Beltran also resigned from their positions.

The directive was scrutinized in both houses of the Congress: the House of Representatives and the Senate (through the Blue Ribbon Committee).

Sebastian cited a July 15 memorandum by Executive Secretary Vic Rodriguez when asked why he signed SO 4 in behalf of Marcos. He was questioned by members of the House of Representatives for his decision believing he did not have any explicit authorization from Marcos. Sebastian maintained that he signed the order in good faith and conceded that he might have "misread" the intention of Marcos, Rodriguez, and other SRA officials.

In a letter to explanation address to Marcos, SRA board member Valderrama maintained that the importation order is based on SRA official data, supply and demand analysis, as well as prevailing high market prices and it was done with consultations with sugar traders. Serafica speaking before the Senate Blue Ribbon Committee admitted he did not consult the board when he drafted SO 4 itself, though he pursued the order following an SRA online meeting with stakeholders including traders on July 29, 2022.

=== SRA reorganization ===
President Marcos announced that he would reorganize the SRA amidst the SO 4 importation controversy. Marcos appointed David John Thaddeus Alba as acting administrator, and Pablo Luis Azcona and Maria Mitzi Mangwag as board members.

=== Other response ===
Despite the averted Sugar Order No. 4, President Marcos in mid-August still raised the possibility of importing sugar to the Philippines to address the sugar crisis. He said that around 150,000 MT of sugar could be imported to address the country's needs for the rest of 2022 and projected the current supply to last until October. Marcos is also looking to secure concessions from traders to keep the price of sugar at a "reasonable" rate and has considered allowing manufacturers to directly import sugar to fulfill their own needs.

== Aftermath ==
In December 2022, the Office of the President (OP) dismissed the case against former officials of the Department of Agriculture and SRA, including Sebastian, Serafica, Beltran, and Valderrama, on grounds that there was no clear evidence that the respondents signed the 300,000 metric tons sugar importation in bad faith. The OP also noted that former Executive Secretary Vic Rodriguez's memorandum dated July 15, 2022 was the source of the miscommunication for the respondents.

== See also ==
- 2022–2023 Philippine onion crisis
- Sugar industry of the Philippines
