= Bongbong Marcos =

President of the Philippines since 2022

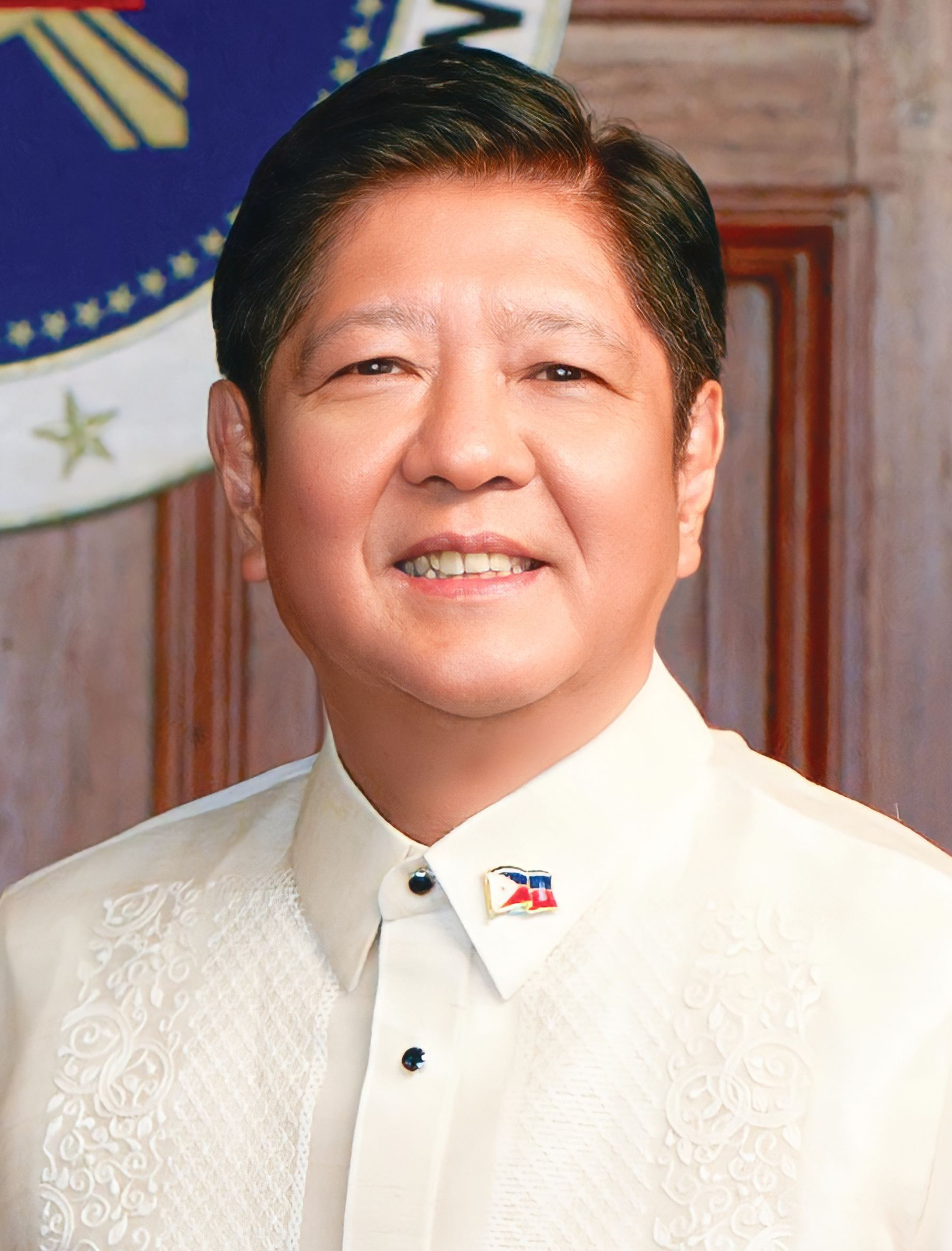
- Official portrait, 2023

17th President of the Philippines
- Incumbent
- Assumed office June 30, 2022
- Vice President: Sara Duterte
- Preceded by: Rodrigo Duterte

Secretary of Agriculture
- In office June 30, 2022 – November 3, 2023
- President: Himself
- Preceded by: William Dar
- Succeeded by: Francisco Tiu Laurel Jr.

Senator of the Philippines
- In office June 30, 2010 – June 30, 2016

Member of the Philippine House of Representatives from Ilocos Norte's 2nd district
- In office June 30, 2007 – June 30, 2010
- Preceded by: Imee Marcos
- Succeeded by: Imelda Marcos
- In office June 30, 1992 – June 30, 1995
- Preceded by: Mariano Nalupta Jr.
- Succeeded by: Simeon Valdez
Local positions
20th and 24th Governor of Ilocos Norte
In office June 30, 1998 – June 30, 2007
Vice Governor	Mariano Nalupta Jr. (1998–2001); Windell Chua (2001–2007)
Preceded by	Rodolfo Fariñas
Succeeded by	Michael Marcos Keon
In office March 23, 1983 – February 25, 1986
Preceded by	Elizabeth Keon
Succeeded by	Castor Raval (OIC)
Vice Governor of Ilocos Norte
In office June 30, 1980 – March 23, 1983
Governor	Elizabeth Keon
Preceded by	Antonio Lazo
Party positions held
Chairman of Partido Federal ng Pilipinas
Incumbent
Assumed office October 5, 2021
President	Reynaldo Tamayo Jr.
Preceded by	Abubakar Mangelen

Personal details
- Born: Ferdinand Romualdez Marcos Jr. September 13, 1957 (age 69) Santa Mesa, Manila, Philippines
- Party: PFP (since 2021)
- Other political affiliations: KBL (1978–2009); Nacionalista (2009–2021)
- Spouse: Louise Araneta (m. 1993)
- Children: 3, including Sandro and Vinny
- Parents: Ferdinand Marcos (father); Imelda Marcos (mother)
- Relatives: Marcos family Romualdez family
- Education: University of Asia and the Pacific; St Edmund Hall, Oxford (special diploma)
- Website: pbbm.com.ph
- Bongbong Marcos's voice Speech for the presidential assistance to farmers, fisherfolk, and their families in Albay (Recorded on November 6, 2024)

Ferdinand "Bongbong" Romualdez Marcos Jr. (Note: UK: /ˈmɑːrkɒs/, US: /-koʊs, -kɔːs/, Tagalog: [ˈmaɾkɔs]) (born September 13, 1957), commonly referred to by the initials BBM or PBBM, is a Filipino politician who has served as the 17th president of the Philippines since 2022. He is the second child and only son of 10th president Ferdinand Marcos and former first lady Imelda Marcos.

In 1980, Marcos was elected vice governor of Ilocos Norte, running unopposed with the Kilusang Bagong Lipunan party of his father, who was ruling the Philippines under martial law at the time. He then became governor in 1983, holding that office until his family was ousted from power by the People Power Revolution and fled into exile in Hawaii in February 1986. After the death of his father in 1989, President Corazon Aquino allowed his family to return to the Philippines to face various charges; in October 1991, he became the first Marcos to return since the revolution. Marcos and his mother, Imelda, are currently facing arrest in the United States for defying a court order to pay US$353 million (₱17,385,250,000 in 2025) in restitution to human rights abuse victims during his father's dictatorship. As president, however, he may enter the United States by virtue of diplomatic immunity.

Marcos was elected as the representative of Ilocos Norte's second district, serving from 1992 to 1995. He was elected governor again in 1998. After nine years, he returned to his previous position as representative from 2007 to 2010, before entering the Senate of the Philippines under the Nacionalista Party for a single term from 2010 to 2016. Marcos unsuccessfully ran for vice president in the 2016 election, narrowly losing to Camarines Sur representative Leni Robredo. Marcos contested the result at the Presidential Electoral Tribunal but his electoral protest was unanimously dismissed in 2021 after the pilot recount resulted in Robredo widening her lead by 15,093 additional votes.

Marcos ran for president in the 2022 election under the Partido Federal ng Pilipinas, which he won by a landslide with nearly 59% of the vote. During his campaign, he refrained from participating in presidential debates. Although President Rodrigo Duterte had expressed criticisms of Marcos as a "weak leader", Duterte's daughter Sara ran as Marcos' running mate and won a majority of the votes, with their UniTeam coalition being credited for their resounding electoral success. His win was the largest since 1981, when his father won 88% of the votes due to a boycott by the opposition. His presidential campaign received criticism from fact-checkers and disinformation scholars for being driven by historical negationism aimed at rehabilitating the Marcos brand and smearing his rivals.

As president, Marcos concurrently served as the Secretary of Agriculture in his initial 16 months. He continued the Build! Build! Build! infrastructure program of President Duterte through his own program called "Build Better More". Foreign policy has been characterized by efforts to reestablish closer ties with the United States, an abrupt shift from the China-oriented policies of the Duterte administration. Amidst China's increased territorial encroachment in the maritime area within the West Philippine Sea that has led to standoffs with Filipino vessels, Marcos has repeatedly affirmed Philippine jurisdiction over the area, stating in 2023 that "This country will not lose an inch of its territory". In 2024, Marcos banned Philippine offshore gaming operators that had proliferated under the previous administration, while Vice President Sara Duterte resigned from his cabinet amidst a growing rift in the Marcos and Duterte political families. The year 2025 was marked by controversy over the national budget, the impeachment of Vice President Duterte, the arrest of former president Rodrigo Duterte, and a massive infrastructure corruption scandal he had initially publicized and denounced.

== Early life and education ==
Ferdinand Romualdez Marcos Jr. was born on September 13, 1957 to Ferdinand Marcos and Imelda Romualdez Marcos, at a hospital in Santa Mesa, Manila, Philippines, which became known as the Our Lady of Lourdes Hospital the following year. (Note: Although OLLH acknowledged its 75th anniversary of service in 2023, the hospital's official website states that its current iteration was only officially founded in 1958 by the Missionary Sisters Servants of the Holy Spirit (SSpS).) At the time of his birth, his father Ferdinand was the representative for the second district of Ilocos Norte, and became a senator two years later. His godfathers include the "Marcos cronies" Eduardo "Danding" Cojuangco Jr. and Jose Yao Campos.

=== Education ===
Marcos first studied at the Institución Teresiana in Quezon City and La Salle Green Hills in Mandaluyong, where he obtained his kindergarten and elementary education, respectively.

In 1970, Marcos was sent to England where he lived and studied at Worth School, an all-boys Benedictine institution in West Sussex. He was studying there when his father declared martial law throughout the Philippines in 1972.

Marcos attended the Center for Research and Communication, where he took a special diploma course in economics, but did not finish. He then enrolled at St Edmund Hall, Oxford, to study philosophy, politics and economics (PPE). Despite his false claims that he graduated with a bachelor of arts in PPE, he did not obtain such a degree. Marcos passed philosophy, but failed economics, and failed politics twice, making him ineligible for graduation. Instead, he received a special diploma in social studies, which was awarded mainly to non-graduates and is currently no longer offered by the university. Marcos still falsely claims that he obtained a degree from the University of Oxford despite the university confirming in 2015 that Marcos did not finish his degree.

Marcos enrolled in the master's in business administration program at the Wharton School of Business, University of Pennsylvania, in Philadelphia, United States, which he failed to complete. Marcos asserts that he withdrew from the program after his election to be Vice Governor of Ilocos Norte in 1980. The Presidential Commission on Good Government later reported that his tuition, his US$10,000 (₱492,500 in 2025) monthly allowance, and the estate he lived in while studying at Wharton, were paid using funds that could be traced partly to the intelligence funds of the Office of the President, and partly to some of the fifteen bank accounts that the Marcoses had secretly opened in the US under assumed names.

=== Early public roles ===
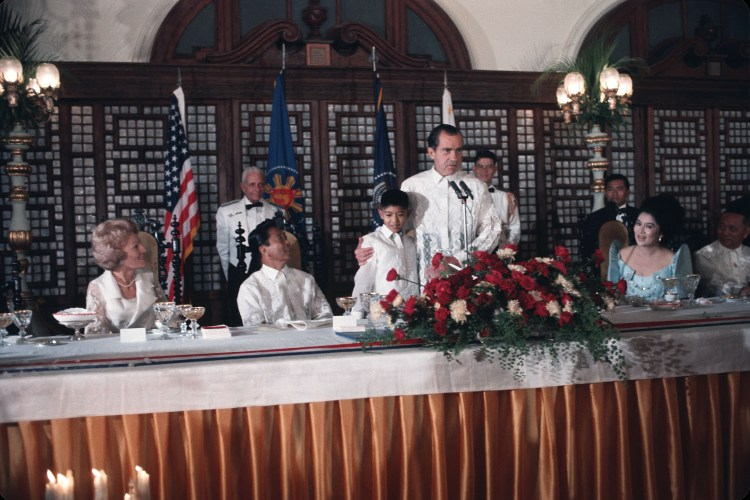
Ferdinand and Imelda Marcos meeting with United States president Richard Nixon, shown holding Bongbong, in 1969

Marcos was thrust into the national limelight as early as when he was three years old, and the scrutiny became even more intense when his father first ran for President of the Philippines in 1965, when he was eight years old.

During his father's 1965 campaign, Marcos played himself in the Sampaguita Pictures film Iginuhit ng Tadhana (The Ferdinand E. Marcos Story), a biopic based on the novel For Every Tear a Victory. The young Marcos was portrayed giving a speech towards the end of the film, in which he says that he would like to be a politician when he grows up. The public relations value of the film is credited for having helped the elder Marcos win the 1965 Philippine elections.

A young Bongbong Marcos and his sister Imee played a small role in the controversial "Manila incident" of the Beatles in July 1966, just six months after their father assumed the presidency. Bongbong and Imee were among 400 children whom their mother Imelda brought to Malacañang Palace for a reception in which they expected the Beatles to show up. The four band members claimed not to know about the event, and refused to attend.

As the event went on without them, the Marcos children were interviewed. Bongbong, referring to the group's long hair, was quoted saying "I'd like to pounce on the Beatles and cut off their hair! Don't anybody dare me to do anything, because I'll do it, just to see how game the Beatles are." Imee, meantime, was quoted saying "There is only one song I like from the Beatles, and it's Run for Your Life."—a quote which media later associated with the way the Beatles scrambled out of Manila, receiving rough treatment at Manila International Airport.

Beatles lead guitarist George Harrison later accused the Marcoses of inciting Filipinos to mob the band as they tried to leave the country for not showing up at the reception, saying in a 1986 interview at NBC's Today Show that the Marcoses "tried to kill [them]." Harrison said that their plane was not allowed to leave Manila until their manager, Brian Epstein, refunded the concert ticket money.

The Manila Bulletin reported in 2015 that Marcos had once invited Beatles drummer Ringo Starr to return to the Philippines "to bring closure" to the incident. The incident was brought up in the media again after a 2021 interview between Marcos and actress Toni Gonzaga, when he was asked about which musicians he idolized, and he casually mentioned that he was friends with Mick Jagger of the Rolling Stones and members of the Beatles.

Marcos was still a minor in 1972 when martial law was declared. Marcos turned 18 in 1975—a year after he graduated from Worth School.

== Roles in the Marcos regime ==
=== Vice governorship and governorship in Ilocos Norte ===
Marcos's first formal role in a political office came with his election as Vice Governor of Ilocos Norte (1980–1983) at the age of 22. On March 23, 1983, he was installed as the Governor of Ilocos Norte, replacing his aunt Elizabeth Marcos-Keon, who had resigned from the post for health reasons. In 1983, he led a group of young Filipino leaders on a 10-day diplomatic mission to China to mark the tenth anniversary of Philippine–Chinese relations. He stayed in office until the People Power Revolution in 1986.

During Marcos's term, at least two extrajudicial killings took place in Ilocos Norte, as documented by the Martial Law Victims Association of Ilocos Norte (MLVAIN).

=== Chairmanship of PHILCOMSAT Board ===
Marcos was appointed by his father to be chairman of the board of the Philippine Communications Satellite Corporation (PHILCOMSAT) in early 1985. In a prominent example of what Finance Minister Jaime Ongpin later branded "crony capitalism", the Marcos administration had sold its majority shares to Marcos cronies such as Roberto S. Benedicto, Manuel H. Nieto, Jose Yao Campos, and Rolando Gapud in 1982, despite being very profitable because of its role as the sole agent for the Philippines' link to global satellite network Intelsat.

President Marcos acquired a 39.9% share in the company, through front companies under Campos and Gapud. This allowed President Marcos to appoint his son as the chairman of the Philcomsat board in early 1985, allowing the young Marcos to draw a monthly salary "ranging from US$9,700 to US$97,000" (₱477,725 to ₱4,777,250 in 2025) despite rarely visiting the office and having no duties there. PHILCOMSAT was one of five telecommunications firms sequestered by the Philippine government in 1986.

=== Ill-gotten Marcos family wealth ===
After the Marcos family went into exile in 1986, the Presidential Commission on Good Government found that the three Marcos children benefited significantly from what the Supreme Court of the Philippines defined as "ill-gotten wealth" of the Marcos family.

Aside from the tuition, US$10,000 (₱492,500 in 2025) monthly allowance, and the estates used by Marcos Jr. and Imee Marcos during their respective studies at Wharton and Princeton, each of the Marcos children was assigned a mansion in the Metro Manila area, as well as in Baguio, the Philippines' designated summer capital. Properties specifically said to have been given to Marcos Jr. included the Wigwam House compound on Outlook Drive in Baguio and the Seaside Mansion Compound in Parañaque.

In addition, by the time their father was ousted from power in 1986, both Marcos Jr. and Imee held key posts in the Marcos administration. Imee was already 30 when she was appointed as the national head of the Kabataang Barangay in the late 1970s, and Marcos Jr. was in his 20s when he took up the vice-gubernatorial post for the province of Ilocos Norte in 1980, and then became governor of that province from 1983 until the Marcos family was ousted from Malacañang in 1986.

=== As an Officer of the Philippine Constabulary ===
Marcos Jr. was commissioned as a Second Lieutenant in the Philippine Constabulary Reserve in 1978, as a member of the Presidential Security Command, while serving as a special presidential assistant for his father. He had also undergone a six-month officer course at the Philippine Marine Training Center.

== EDSA revolution and exile (1986–1991) ==
During the last days of the 1986 People Power Revolution, Bongbong Marcos, dressed in combat fatigues to project his warlike stance, pushed his father Ferdinand Marcos to give the order to his remaining troops to attack and blow up Camp Crame despite the presence of hundreds of thousands of civilians there. The elder Marcos did not follow his son's urgings.

Fearful of a scenario in which Marcos's presence in the Philippines would lead to a civil war, the Reagan administration withdrew its support for the Marcos government, and flew Marcos and a party of about 80 individuals – the extended Marcos family and a number of close associates – from the Philippines to Hawaii despite Ferdinand Marcos's objections. Bongbong Marcos and his family were on the flight with his parents.

Soon after arriving in Hawaii, the younger Marcos participated in an attempt to withdraw US$200 million (₱9,849,999,999.96 in 2025) from a secret family bank account with Credit Suisse in Switzerland, an act which eventually led to the Swiss government freezing the Marcoses' bank accounts in late March that year.

The Marcoses initially stayed at Hickam Air Force Base at the expense of the U.S. government. A month after arriving in Honolulu, they moved into a pair of residences in Makiki Heights, Honolulu, which were registered to Marcos cronies Antonio Floirendo and Bienvenido and Gliceria Tantoco.

Ferdinand Marcos eventually died in exile three years later, in 1989, with Marcos Jr. being the only family member present at his father's deathbed.

== Return to the Philippines; political career (1991–2022) ==
In the early 1990s, President Corazon Aquino permitted the return of the remaining members of the Marcos family to the Philippines to face various charges. Bongbong Marcos flew on a private plane from Singapore to the Philippines and landed in Laoag, Ilocos Norte on October 31, 1991, becoming the first Marcos family member to return to the Philippines since 1986; his mother Imelda followed suit four days later. He soon sought political office, beginning in the family's traditional fiefdom in Ilocos Norte.

=== House of Representatives, first term ===
Marcos ran for and was elected representative of the second district of Ilocos Norte to the Philippine House of Representatives (1992–1995). When his mother, Imelda Marcos, ran for president in the same election, he decided against supporting her candidacy, and instead expressed support for his godfather Danding Cojuangco. During his term, Marcos was the author of 29 House bills and co-author of 90 more, which includes those that paved the way for the creation of the Department of Energy and the National Youth Commission. He also allocated most of his Countryside Development Fund (CDF) to organizing the cooperatives of teachers and farmers in his home province. In October 1992, he led a group of ten representatives in attending the first sports summit in the Philippines, held in Baguio. In late 1994, he was made president of the Kilusang Bagong Lipunan party, which is known for its support for the Marcos regime.

In 1995, Marcos ran for the Senate under the NPC-led coalition but lost, placing only 16th.

==== Compromise deal attempt ====
In 1995, Bongbong Marcos pushed a deal to allow the Marcos family to keep a quarter of the estimated US$2 billion to US$10 billion (₱98,499,999,999.61 to ₱492,499,999,998.03 in 2025) that the Philippine government had still not recovered from them, on the condition that all civil cases be dropped – a deal that was eventually struck down by the Philippines' Supreme Court.

=== Ilocos Norte governor, second stint ===
Having previously served as Ilocos Norte governor from 1983 to 1986, Marcos was again elected as governor of Ilocos Norte in 1998, running against his father's closest friend and ally, Roque Ablan Jr. He served for three consecutive terms ending in 2007.

=== House of Representatives, second term ===
In 2007, Marcos ran unopposed for the congressional seat previously held by his older sister Imee. He was then appointed as deputy minority leader of the House of Representatives. During this term, Marcos supported the passage of the Philippine Archipelagic Baselines Law, or Republic Act No. 9522. He also wrote his own version of the law, but the bill only remained in the House Committee on Foreign Affairs. He also promoted the Republic Act No. 9502 (Universally Accessible Cheaper and Quality Medicines Act) which was enacted on 2009.

=== Senate career ===
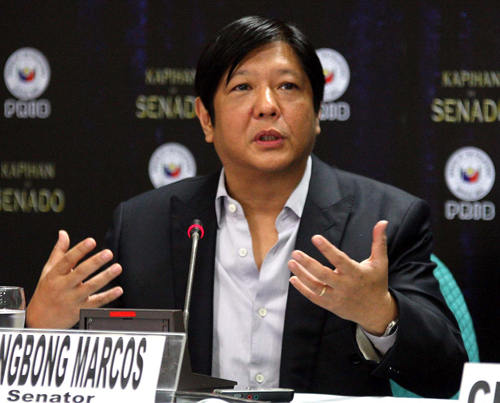
Senator Marcos during a forum in June 2014

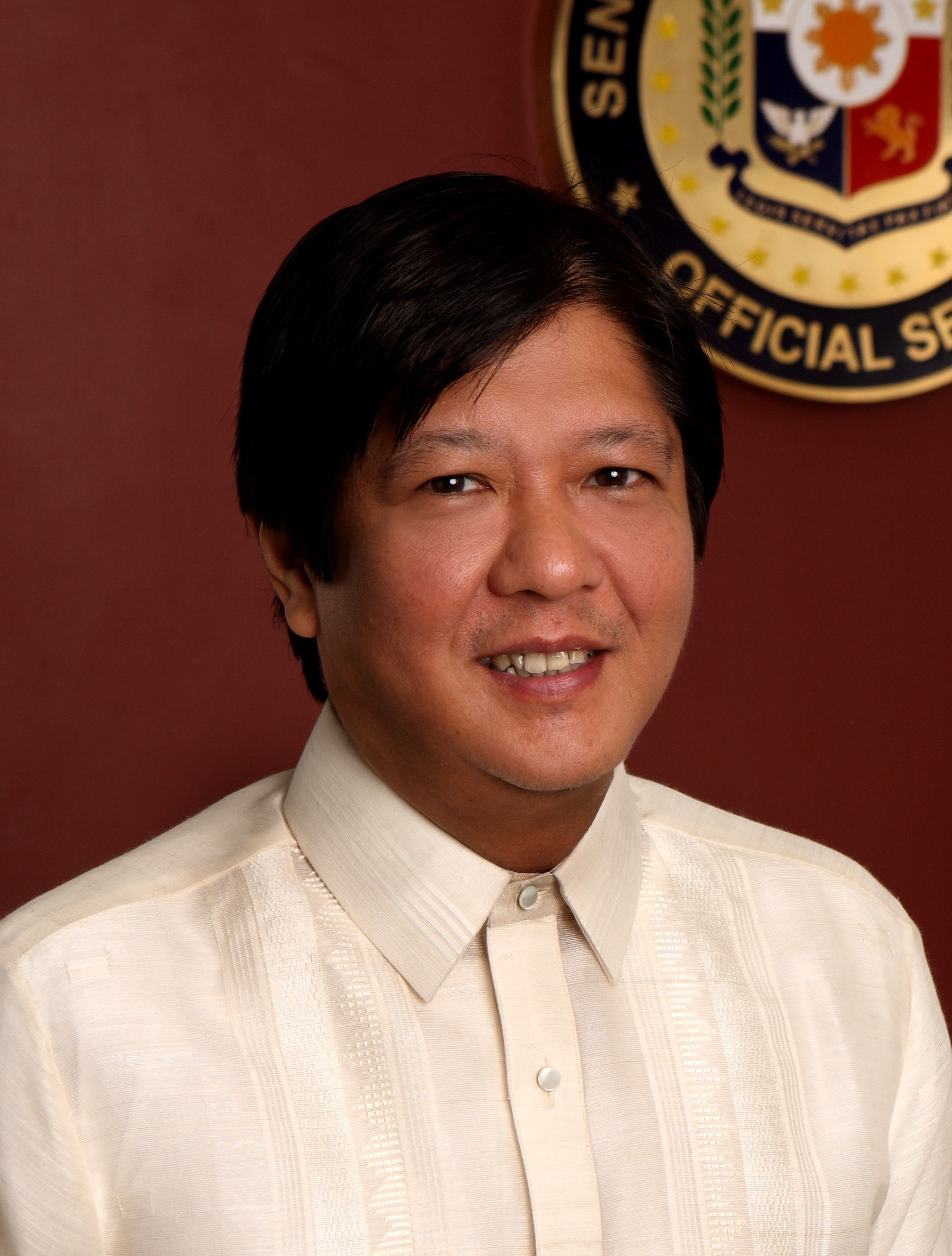
Portrait during his stint as senator

Marcos made a second attempt for the Senate in 2010. On November 20, 2009, the KBL forged an alliance with the Nacionalista Party (NP) between Marcos and NP chair Senator Manny Villar at the Laurel House in Mandaluyong. Marcos became a guest senatorial candidate of the NP through this alliance. Marcos was later removed as a member by the KBL National Executive Committee on November 23, 2009. As such, the NP broke its alliance with the KBL due to internal conflicts within the party, however Marcos remained part of the NP senatorial lineup. He was proclaimed as one of the winning senatorial candidates of the 2010 senate elections. He took office on June 30, 2010.

In the 15th Congress (2010–2013), Marcos authored 34 Senate bills. He also co-authored 17 bills of which seven were enacted into law – most notably the Anti-Drunk and Drugged Driving Act whose principal author was Senator Vicente Sotto III; the Cybercrime Prevention Act whose principal author was Senator Edgardo Angara; and the Expanded Anti-Trafficking in Persons and the National Health Insurance Acts, both of which were principally authored by Senator Loren Legarda.

Marcos delivering a sponsorship speech on the charter of the City of General Trias in 2015.

In the 16th Congress (2013–2016), Marcos filed 52 bills, of which 28 were refiled from the 15th Congress. One of them was enacted into law: Senate Bill No. 1186, which sought the postponement of the 2013 Sangguniang Kabataan (SK) elections, was enacted as Republic Act No. 10632 on October 3, 2013.

Marcos also co-authored 4 Senate bills in the 16th Congress. One of them, Senate Bill No. 712 which was principally authored by Ralph Recto, was enacted as Republic Act No. 10645, the Expanded Senior Citizens Act of 2010.

He was the chair of the Senate committees on urban planning, housing and resettlement, local government, and public works. He also chaired the oversight committee on the Autonomous Region in Muslim Mindanao (ARMM) Organic Act, the congressional oversight panel on the Special Purpose Vehicle Act, and a select oversight committee on barangay affairs.

==== 2014 pork barrel scam ====
In 2014, Bongbong Marcos was implicated by Janet Lim Napoles and Benhur Luy in the Priority Development Assistance Fund (PDAF) Pork Barrel scam through agent Catherine Mae "Maya" Santos. He allegedly channeled ₱100 million through 4 fake NGOs linked with Napoles. Marcos claimed that the large amounts of money was released by the budget department without his knowledge and that his signatures were forged. In connection to the PDAF scam, Marcos was also sued for plunder by iBalik ang Bilyones ng Mamamayan (iBBM), an alliance of youth organizations. The group cited Luy's digital files, which showed bogus NGOs with shady or non-existent offices.

==== 2016 Commission on Audit suit ====
In 2016, Marcos was also sued for plunder for funneling ₱205 million of his PDAF via 9 special allotment release orders (SARO) to the following bogus foundations from October 2011 to January 2013, according to Luy's digital files:

- Social Development Program for Farmers Foundation (SDPFFI) – ₱15 million
- Countrywide Agri and Rural Economic Development Foundation (CARED) – ₱35 million
- People's Organization for Progress and Development Foundation (POPDFI) – ₱40 million
- Health Education Assistance Resettlement Training Services (HEARTS) – ₱10 million
- Kaupdanan Para Sa Mangunguma Foundation (KMFI) – ₱20 million
- National Livelihood Development Corporation (NLDC) – ₱100 million

These NGOs were found by the Commission on Audit (COA) as bogus with shady or non-existent offices.

=== 2016 vice presidential campaign ===
On October 5, 2015, Marcos announced via his website that he would run for Vice President of the Philippines in the 2016 general election, stating "I have decided to run for vice president in the May 2016 elections." Marcos ran as an independent candidate. Prior to his announcement, he had declined an invitation by presidential candidate, Vice President Jejomar Binay, to become his running mate. On October 15, 2015, presidential candidate Miriam Defensor Santiago confirmed that Marcos would serve as her running mate.

Marcos placed second in the tightly contested vice presidential race, losing to Camarines Sur's 3rd district representative Leni Robredo, who won by a margin of 263,473 votes, one of the closest since Fernando Lopez's victory in the 1965 vice presidential election.

==== Election results protest ====
Marcos challenged the results of the election, lodging an electoral protest against Leni Robredo on June 29, 2016, the day before Robredo's oathtaking. President Rodrigo Duterte has stated several times that he would resign if Marcos would be his successor instead of Vice President Leni Robredo.

A recount began in April 2018, covering polling precincts in Iloilo and Camarines Sur, which were areas handpicked by Marcos's camp. In October 2019, the tribunal found that Robredo's lead grew by around 15,000 votes – a total of 278,566 votes from Robredo's original lead of 263,473 votes – after a recount of ballots from the 5,415 clustered precincts in Marcos's identified pilot provinces. On February 16, 2021, the Presidential Electoral Tribunal (PET) unanimously dismissed Bongbong Marcos's electoral protest against Leni Robredo.

=== 2022 presidential campaign and election ===
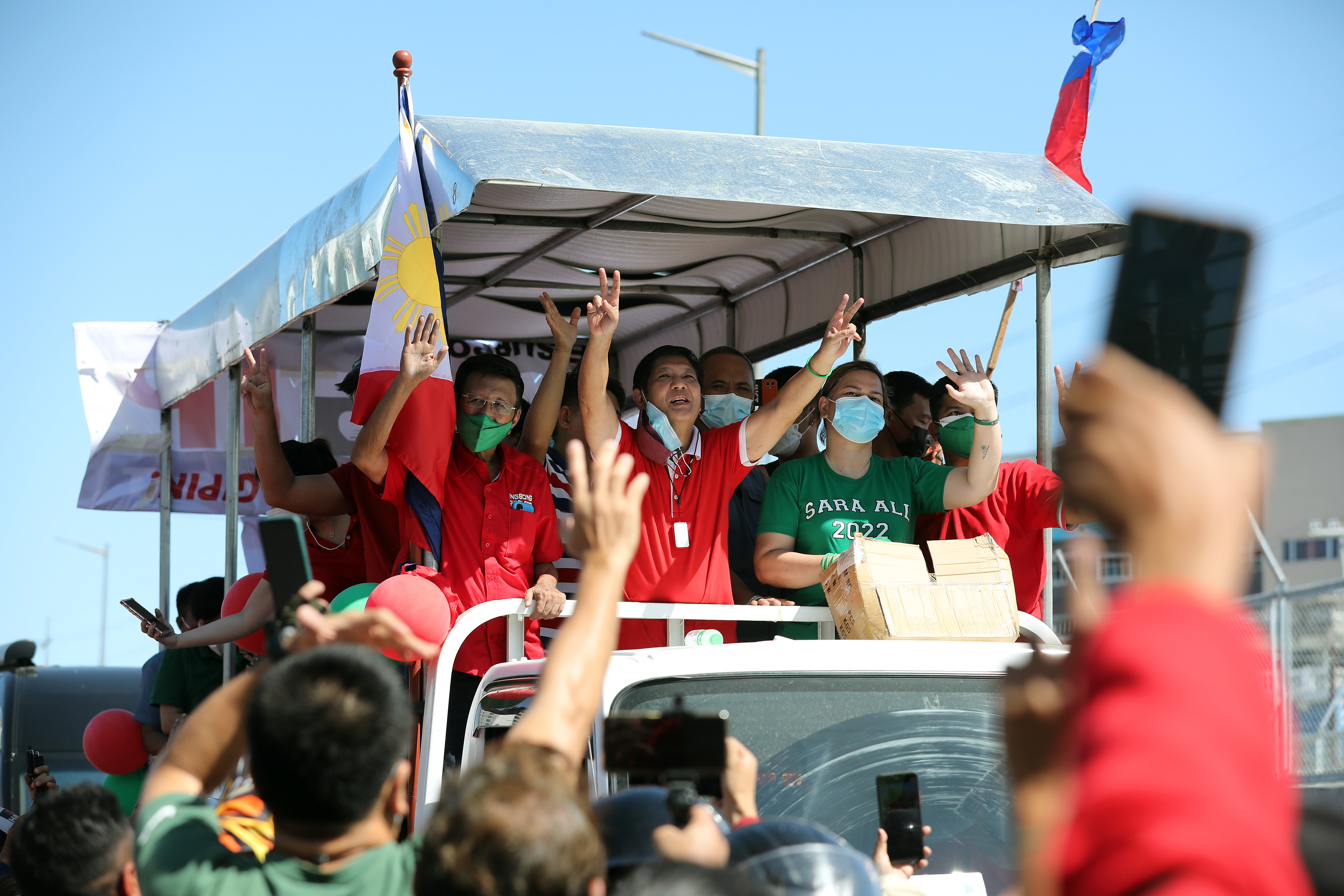
Marcos (center) and his running mate Sara Duterte during a grand caravan in Quezon City in December 2021

Marcos officially launched his campaign for president of the Philippines on October 5, 2021, through a video post on Facebook and YouTube. An interview with his wife Liza Marcos revealed that he decided to run for president while watching the film Ant-Man, though Marcos admitted that he could not recall this moment. He ran under the banner of the Partido Federal ng Pilipinas party, assuming chairmanship of the party on the same day, while also being endorsed by his former party, the Kilusang Bagong Lipunan. He was endorsed by controversial religious group Iglesia ni Cristo (INC).

Marcos filed his certificate of candidacy before the Commission on Elections the following day. On November 16, Marcos announced his running mate to be Davao City mayor Sara Duterte, daughter of President Rodrigo Duterte. Under the campaign theme of unity, Marcos and Duterte's alliance was given the name "UniTeam".

Seven petitions were filed against Marcos's presidential bid. Three petitions aimed to cancel his certificate of candidacy (COC), one petition aimed to declare Marcos a nuisance candidate, and three petitions aimed to disqualify him. Most of the petitions were based on Marcos's 1995 conviction for failing to file tax returns. Three disqualification petitions were consolidated and raffled to the commission's first division, while three other petitions were handed to the second division.

The final petition was handed to the first division. Marcos dismissed the petitions as nuisance petitions with no legal basis and propaganda against him. On May 16 and 18, 2022, respectively, two of the petitions were filed at the Supreme Court. The consolidated petitions were dismissed by the Court on June 28.

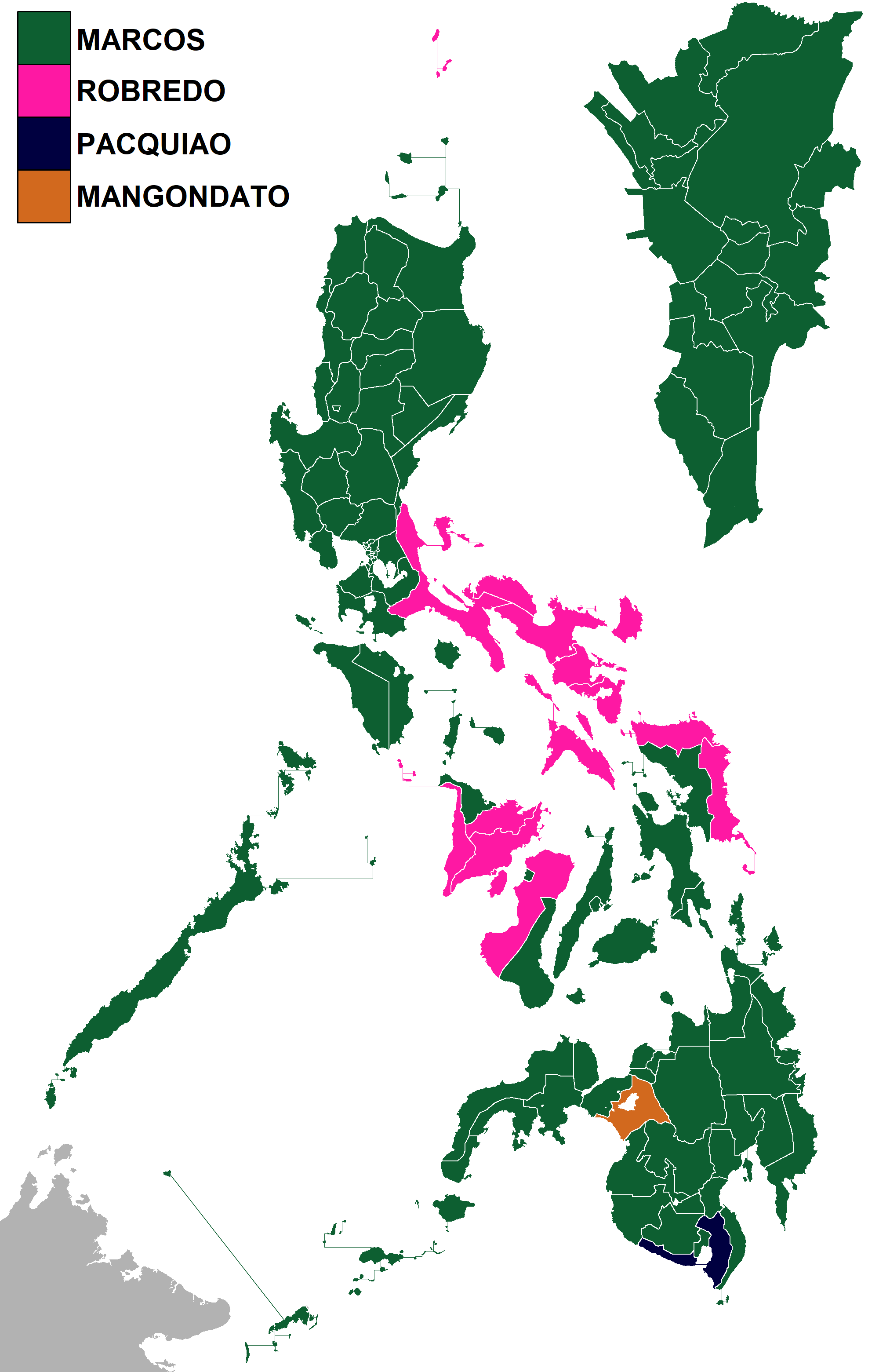
Marcos won in 64 out of 81 provinces in the 2022 presidential election.

Marcos regularly maintained a wide lead in presidential surveys throughout the months leading up to the May 2022 election; he was the first presidential candidate in the country to attain poll ratings of over 50% from surveys conducted by Pulse Asia since it began polling in 1999. His refrainment from attending all but one of the presidential debates during the campaign season was widely criticized.

In a joint session of the 18th Congress of the Philippines, overseen by Senate President Tito Sotto and House Speaker Lord Allan Velasco and stated by Senate Majority Leader Migz Zubiri and Majority Floor Leader Martin Romualdez, Marcos was proclaimed the president-elect of the Philippines on May 25, 2022, alongside his running-mate, Vice-President-elect Sara Duterte. Marcos received 31,629,783 votes, or 58.77% of the total votes cast, about 16.5 million votes ahead of his closest rival, Vice President Leni Robredo, who received over 15 million votes.

He became the first presidential candidate to be elected by a majority since the establishment of the Fifth Republic in 1986. According to analysts, Marcos, together with Sara Duterte, "inherited" Rodrigo Duterte's popularity when they both won landslides in the election. Historians noted the significance of his victory as a "full circle" of the Philippines from the People Power Revolution, which deposed his father from the presidency, thus marking the Marcos family's return to national power after 36 years. Marcos's presidential campaign received criticism from fact-checkers and disinformation scholars, who found his campaign to be driven by historical negationism aimed at rehabilitating the Marcos brand and smearing his rivals. His campaign has also been accused of whitewashing the human rights abuses and plunder, estimated at 5 to 13 billion dollars, that took place during his father's presidency. The Washington Post has noted how the historical distortionism of the Marcoses has been underway since the 2000s, while The New York Times cited his convictions of tax fraud, including his refusal to pay his family's estate taxes, and misrepresentation of his education at the University of Oxford.

His majority was the largest since 1981 (surpassing his father's 18,309,360 votes); as the opposition boycotted that election, it is the largest majority since 1969 for a competitive election, and his 31-percentage point margin over his nearest opponent was the greatest since Ramon Magsaysay scored a 38-point margin over incumbent President Elpidio Quirino in 1953. His vote count was not only the largest ever recorded in a presidential election, but close to the sum total of the two previous records combined.

On June 20, 2022, Marcos announced that he will serve as the Secretary of Agriculture in concurrent capacity.

In the 2022 elections, according to their statements of campaign contributions, Bongbong Marcos and Sara Duterte received tens of millions of pesos in campaign contributions from contractors, despite an election ban on taking donations from firms that do business with the Philippine government.

== Presidency (2022–present) ==
Presidential styles of Bongbong Marcos
- Reference style: President Marcos Jr., His Excellency
- Spoken style: Your Excellency
- Alternative style: Mr. President

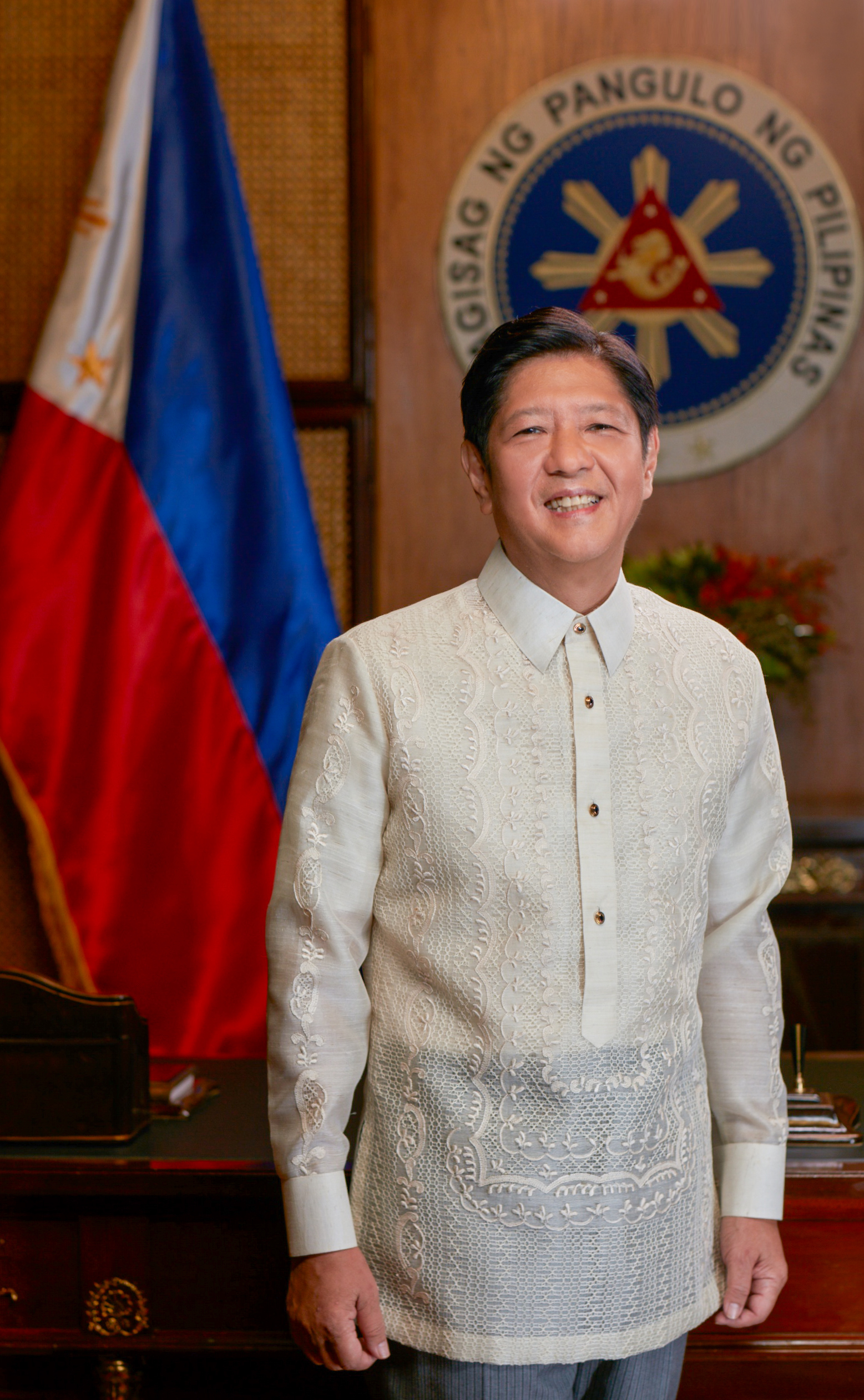
Official portrait, 2022

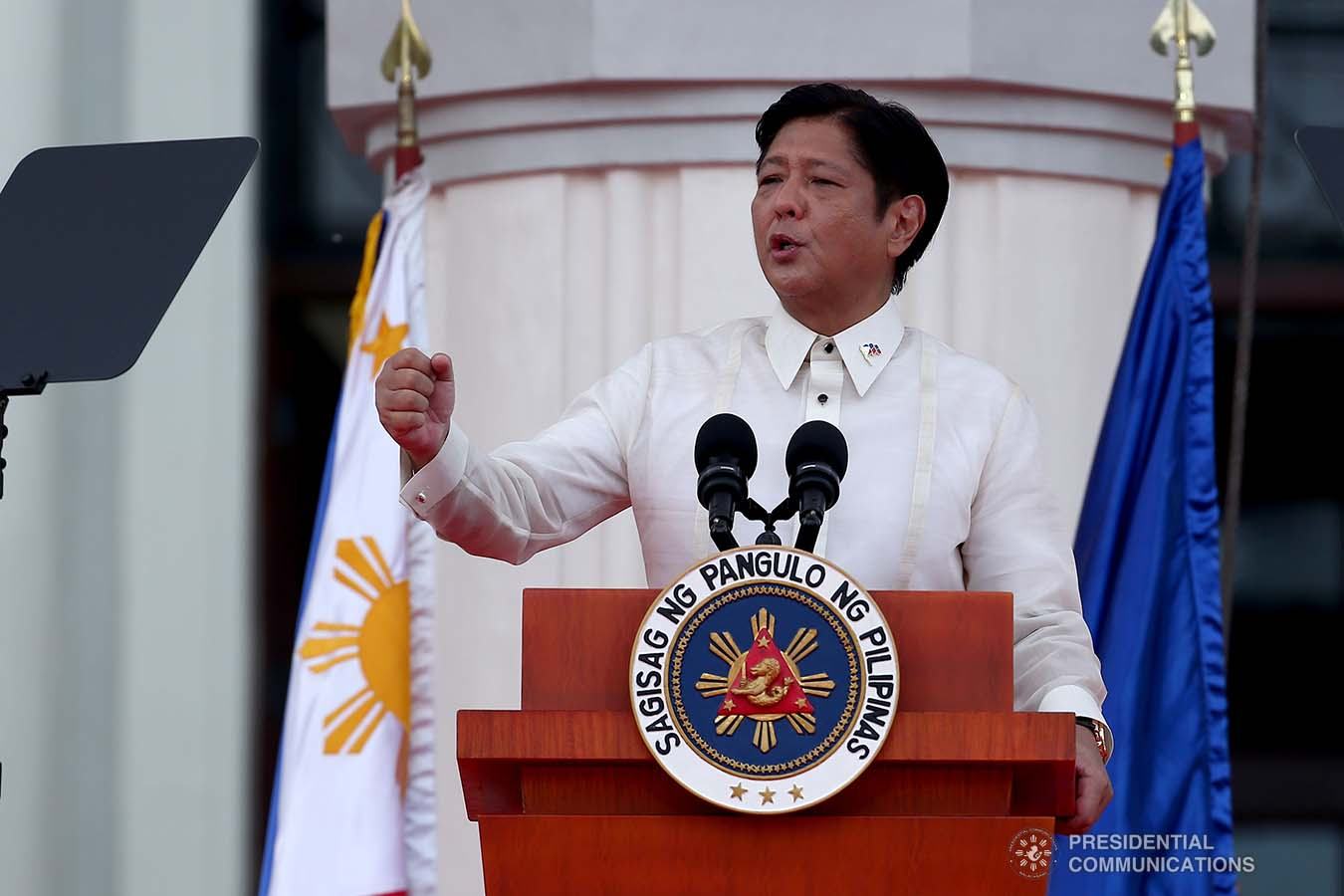
Marcos delivering his inaugural address

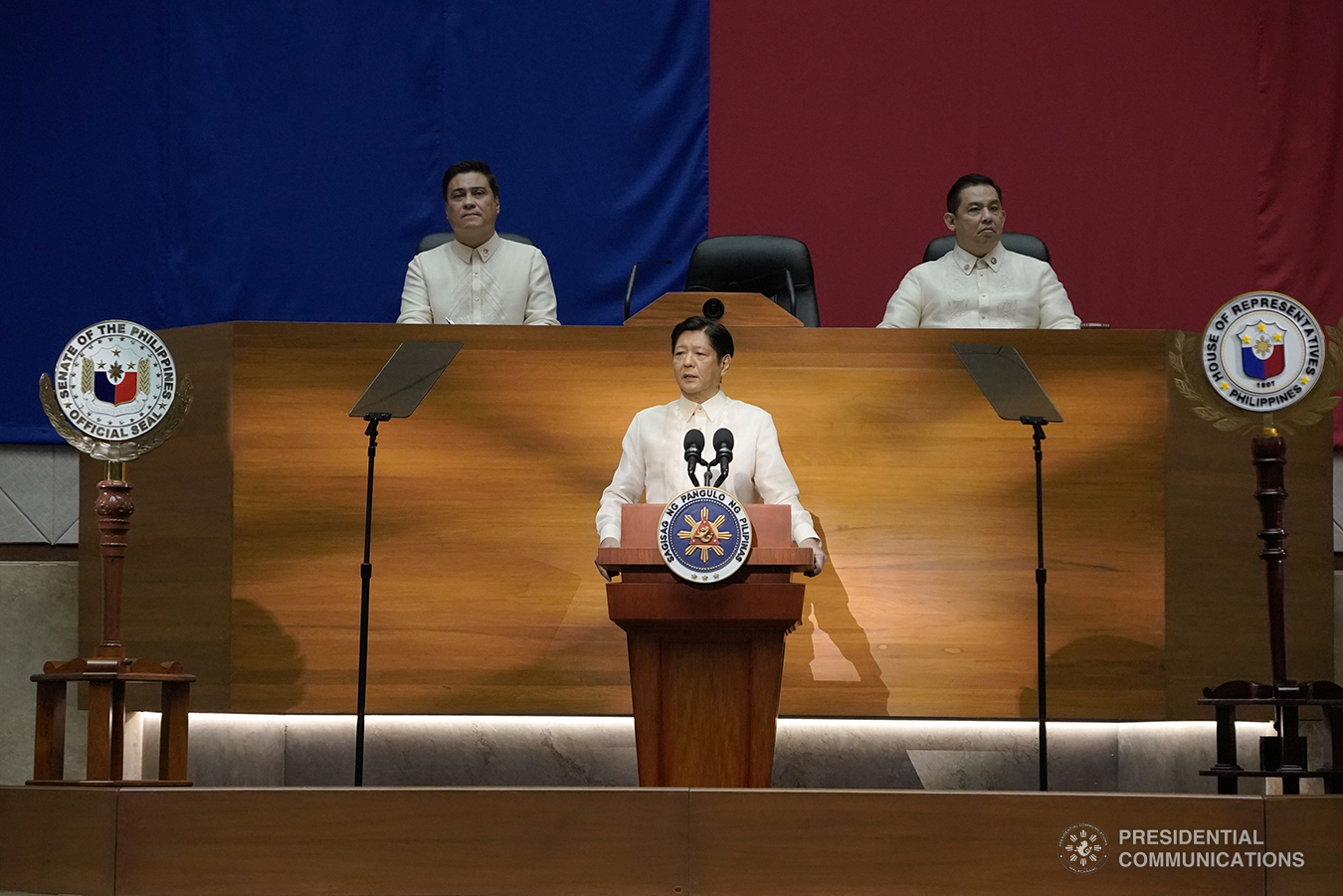
Marcos delivering his first State of the Nation Address on July 25, 2022

=== Early actions ===
On June 30, 2022, at 12:00 noon PST, Marcos Jr. took the oath of office as the 17th President of the Philippines at the National Museum of the Philippines and was administered the oath by Chief Justice Alexander Gesmundo. At concurrent capacity, Marcos appointed himself as Secretary of Agriculture, in order to address inflation and personally monitor the food and agricultural sectors, while enacting efforts to boost farm outputs through various loan programs, affordable pricing measures, and machinery assistance. Marcos's first executive order as president were abolishing two offices: the Presidential Anti Corruption Commission and the Office of the Cabinet Secretary.

The next day after his inauguration, Marcos signed a memorandum seeking to provide free train rides to students, and extends the free rides of the EDSA Carousel until the end of December 2022. Twelve days later, on July 13, 2022, Marcos announced that the free train rides will only be limited to students using the LRT Line 2, due to the line's access points to the University Belt.

Two days after his inauguration, on July 2, 2022, Marcos vetoed a bill sponsored by his sister Senator Imee Marcos that aimed to create a free economic zone within New Manila International Airport. Bongbong Marcos said that the bill would cite "substantial fiscal risks", lacked coherences with existing laws, and the proposed economic zone's location near the existing Clark Freeport and Special Economic Zone; Marcos also called for further studies in establishing the planned economic zone. On the same day, Marcos also ordered that the list of Pantawid Pamilyang Pilipino Program beneficiaries to be cleansed after receiving reports of unqualified beneficiaries receiving cash assistance grants and downturned calls to surrender their accounts.

On July 5, 2022, five days after his inauguration, Marcos held his first cabinet meeting, which was delayed during his inauguration, and laid out his first agenda, which primarily focuses on reviving the economy in the midst of the COVID-19 pandemic. During the meeting, Marcos led the discussions with his economic managers, Finance Secretary Benjamin Diokno, National Economic and Development Authority Secretary Arsenio Balisacan, and Bangko Sentral ng Pilipinas Governor Felipe Medalla, to give a briefing about the country's economic status, and to lay out plans to further revive the country's economy, while combating inflation. Marcos also tackled issues regarding food security, transportation issues, and the reopening of face-to-face classes within the year. On July 23, 2022, Marcos has vetoed a bill which seeks to strengthen the Office of the Government Corporate Counsel (OGCC), as he cited that several provisions of the bill are "inequitable".

On July 25, 2022, the same day of his first State of the Nation Address, Marcos allowed Republic Act No. 11900, known as the Vaporized Nicotine and Non-Nicotine Products Regulation Act to lapse into law. The law became controversial, due to the hounding health risks regarding the usage of electronic cigarettes and heated tobacco products. In an effort to boost the country's booster shot campaign, Marcos launched the "PinasLakas" campaign to continue administering COVID-19 booster doses within the public, by targeting a total of at least 39 million Filipinos to get their booster shots.

Two days after his first State of the Nation Address, following a meeting with Solicitor General Menardo Guevarra, Presidential Legal Adviser Juan Ponce Enrile, Executive Secretary Vic Rodriguez, Foreign Affairs Secretary Enrique Manalo, Justice Secretary Jesus Crispin Remulla, and former presidential spokesman and lawyer Harry Roque on July 27, 2022, Marcos expressed that the Philippines has no intention of rejoining the International Criminal Court, as the death cases linked to the country's drug war of his predecessor's administration are already being investigated by the government, and stated that the government is taking the necessary steps regarding the deaths.

On July 30, 2022, Marcos vetoed a bill which grants tax exemption on poll workers' honoraria and the creation of a transport safety board, stating that the honoraria "counters the objective of the government's Comprehensive Tax Reform Program", while mentioning that the proposed creation of a transport safety board "undertakes the functions by the different agencies" within the transport sector.

=== Domestic policy ===
==== Agriculture and agrarian reforms ====
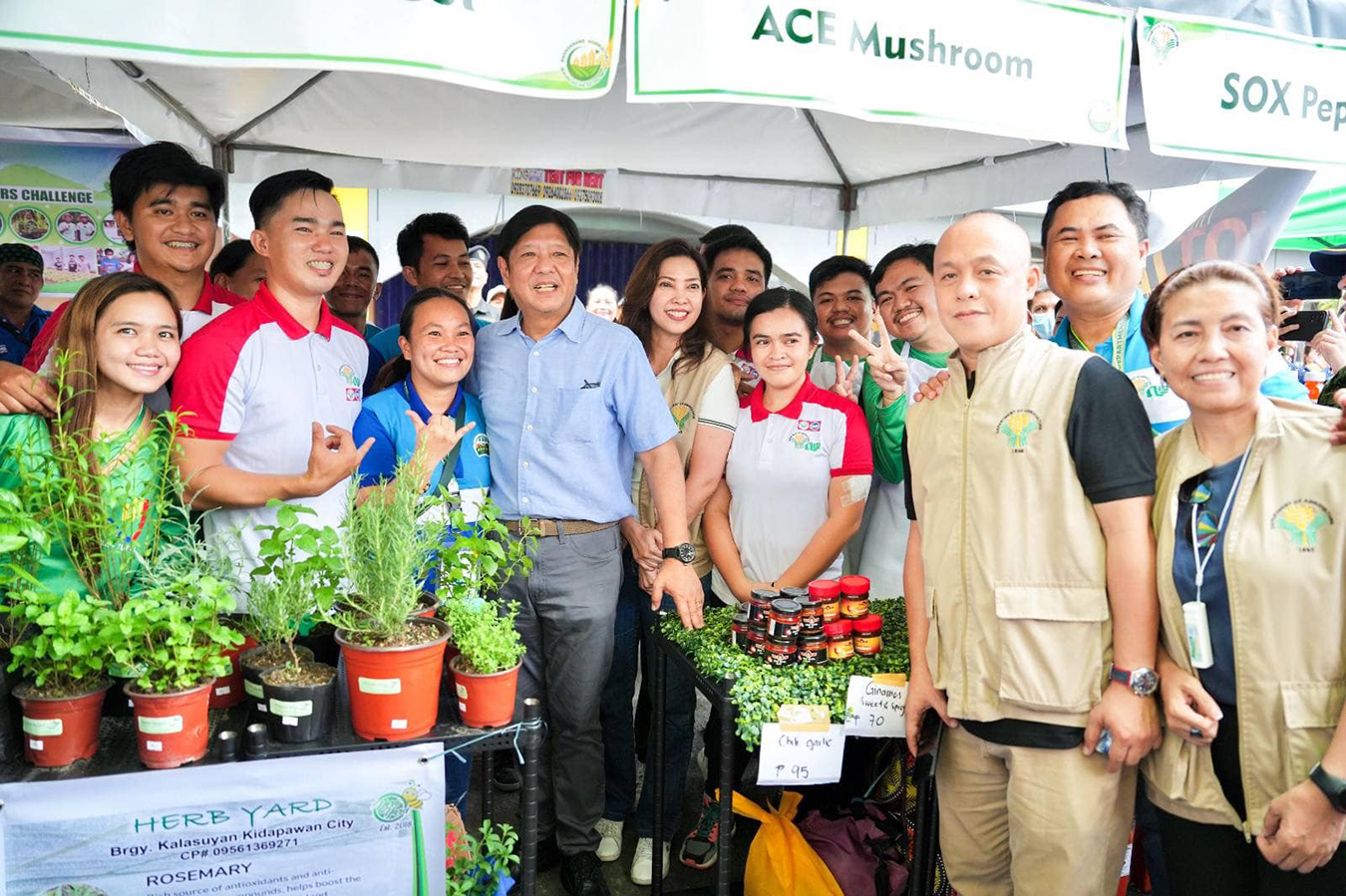
Marcos at a Kadiwa Project outlet in Koronadal, South Cotabato, in June 2023

Subsequently serving as the Secretary of Agriculture, Marcos launched initiatives which aims to improve domestic agricultural output and production, while expanding measures to further establish a farm-to-market approach in providing agricultural products to local markets and far flung areas. In August 2022, as high sugar prices impacted the country due to the effects of Typhoon Odette in December 2021, the Sugar Regulatory Administration (SRA) in August 2022 released an order to import 300,000 metric tons (660,000,000 lb) of sugar, which is aimed to reduce costs and increase the sugar stockpiles. A few days later, Marcos rejected the proposed importation, and Malacañang deemed the move as illegal, as the move was made without Marcos's approval, nor signed by him. SRA Undersecretary Leocadio Sebastian later apologized for the move and later resigned his post on Marcos; behalf, prompting SRA Administrator Hermenegildo Serafica and SRA board member Roland Beltran to follow suit a few days later. The move also caused Malacañang to instigate reforms within the SRA organization, and launched a campaign into alleged efforts of using the sugar order as a "cover measure" for hoarding by sugar traders.

In November 2022, Marcos expanded the Kadiwa Project launched by the Duterte administration, which aims to offer fresh local produces to local markets and other key areas in lower prices, and creates a direct farm-to-market approach of goods and services. The programs is located in various areas throughout the country and temporarily occupies various facilities owned by local governments. The move is also aimed to be expanded permanently to accommodate more consumers affected by inflation.

In January 2023, amid rising prices of onions in the country, Marcos approved the importation of 21,060 metric tons (46,430,000 lb) of onions to cater the gap caused by low local outputs, and stated that the government was "left without a choice" despite approving the smuggled onions to be supplied in local markets.

Marcos signed his fourth executive order on September 14, 2022, which establishes a one-year moratorium on the amortization and interest payments of agrarian reform beneficiaries. The move is seen to assist farmers from debt payments and allows a flexible approach in financial assistance.

In July 2023, Marcos signed the New Agrarian Emancipation Act, freeing at least 600,000 agrarian reform beneficiaries of decades-old debts worth ₱57-billion under the Comprehensive Agrarian Reform Program.

After serving as Secretary of Agriculture for over a year that was marked by a rise in food prices, Marcos relinquished his position and appointed Francisco Tiu Laurel Jr., president of a deep-sea fishing company and a donor to Marcos's 2022 presidential election campaign.

==== Defense ====
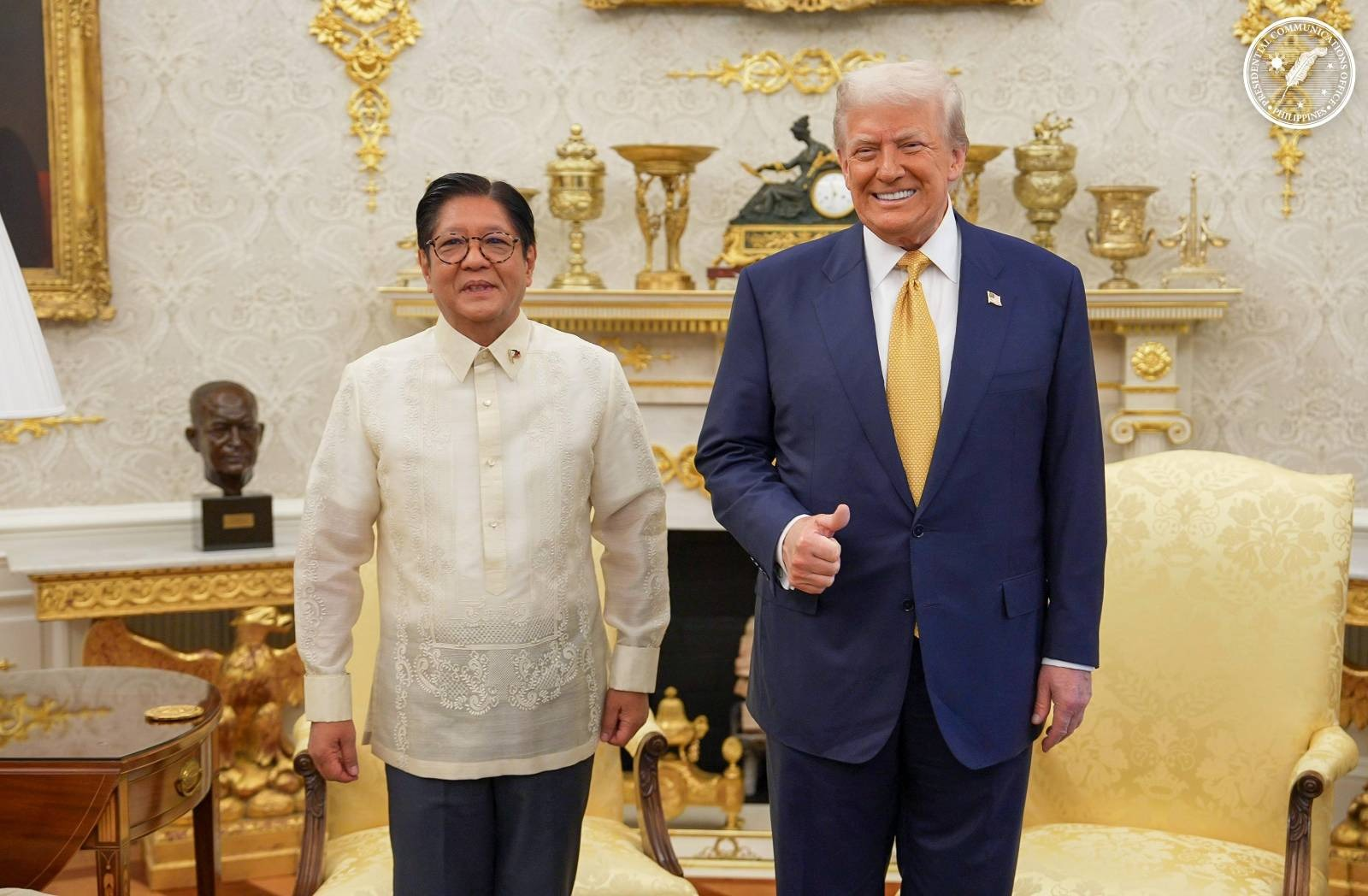
Marcos with United States president Donald Trump at the White House, Washington, D.C., in July 2025

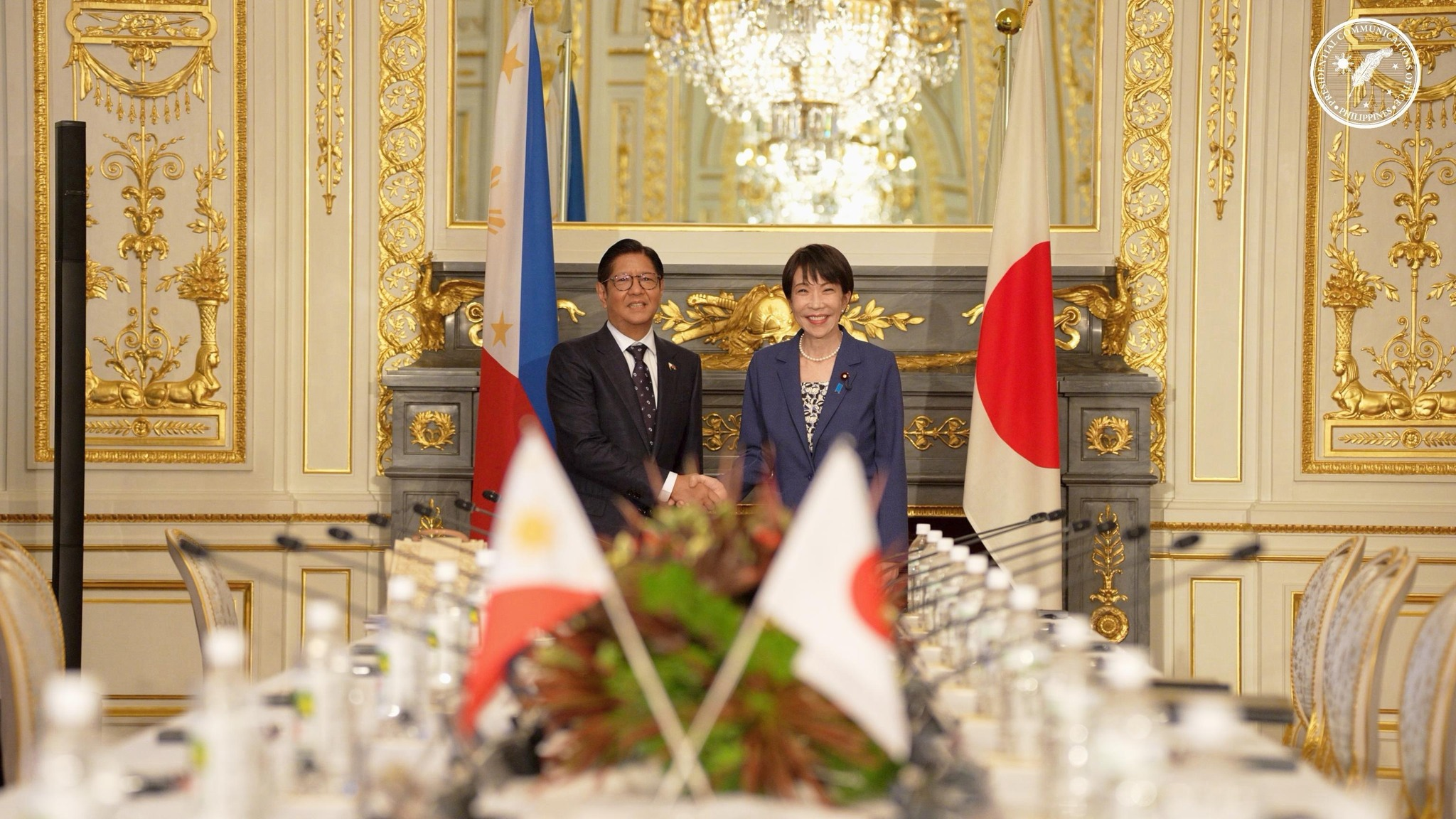
Marcos with Japanese prime minister Sanae Takaichi at the Naikaku Sōri Daijin Kantei, Tokyo, in May 2026

In August 2022, the Marcos administration said it was considering ordering helicopters from the United States military, such as the Boeing CH-47 Chinook, to replace the 16 Russian Mil Mi-17 military helicopters purchased by the Duterte administration, but cancelled the program a few days before the end of Duterte's term out of concerns about existing United States sanctions such as the Countering America's Adversaries Through Sanctions Act (CAATSA) and possible future sanctions in response to the ongoing 2022 Russian invasion of Ukraine. Negotiations are also ongoing to procure limited units which was paid by the government to Rosoboronexport.

Marcos expressed support for the AFP Modernization Program, which aims to boost the country's defense capabilities. Stating that the country's external security situation is becoming "more complex and unpredictable", Marcos ordered the Armed Forces of the Philippines to shift its focus on its defense operations against external threats, due to the lower risks in the country's insurgencies, the Russian invasion of Ukraine, and the potential Chinese invasion of Taiwan.

During the 125th-anniversary celebration of the Philippine Navy, Marcos announced plans to acquire the Philippines' first submarine. The French-based Naval Group, along with other contenders, has offered its Scorpène-class submarines to strengthen the Navy.

With an aim to enhance the country's defense capabilities, Marcos has approved the "Re-Horizon 3" of the AFP Modernization Program, which is also known as the RAFMP. The $35 billion plan revised modernization program will be spread out over 10 years and aims to modernize the Armed Forces of the Philippines based on the Comprehensive Archipelagic Defense Concept (CADC), a defense concept aimed at strengthening the country's external defense deterrence by projecting power within the Philippine's 200 nautical mile exclusive economic zone, Benham Rise, the Luzon Strait, and the Sulu Sea through inter-island defenses doctrines, multi-layered domain strategies, and long-range strike capabilities. The concept also aims to strengthen the country's aerial and maritime domain awareness, connectivity, and intelligence capabilities.

On April 15, 2025, Marcos signed into law Republic Act No. 12174, prohibiting the development, production, stockpiling, and use of chemical weapons in the Philippines.

==== Education ====
In August 2022, despite the low COVID-19 vaccination rate among Filipino students with a total vaccination rate of only 19%, Marcos, along with Vice President and Education Secretary Sara Duterte, reopened onsite classes throughout the country, with 46% or 24,000 schools throughout the country reopening their classes on August 22. Meanwhile, 29,721 schools were allowed to continue implementing blended learning from August to October 2022, while the full implementation of onsite classes began within November 2022, with 97.5% of public schools returning to onsite classes, while the remaining 2.36% of classes were temporarily held online due to the effects of Severe Tropical Storm Paeng.

Marcos also reviewed the implementation of the K–12 program as part of his push to modernize the country's education system, and laid out measures such as system reforms to address the lack of jobs and potential job mismatches, reviewing the usage of English as a medium of instruction in schools, and improving the country's education technology systems. Marcos also expressed his support to modernize the country's schools by improving science-related subjects and courses, theoretical aptitude, and vocational skills.

==== Economy ====
Real GDP growth rate (year-on-year) under the Marcos Jr. administration
Year	Quarter	Growth rate (%)
2022	3rd	7.6
2022	4th	7.2
2023	1st	6.4
2023	2nd	4.3
2023	3rd	6.0
2023	4th	5.6
2024	1st	5.7
2024	2nd	6.3
2024	3rd	5.2
2024	4th	5.2
2025	1st	5.4

About 63% of Filipinos considers themselves poor by the fourth quarter of 2024 amidsts the rising inflation, which was the highest since 2003. Exports began to decline during his administration. Following an all-time high of nearly $80 billion in 2022, it declined to $74 billion in 2023, and $68 billion in 2024.

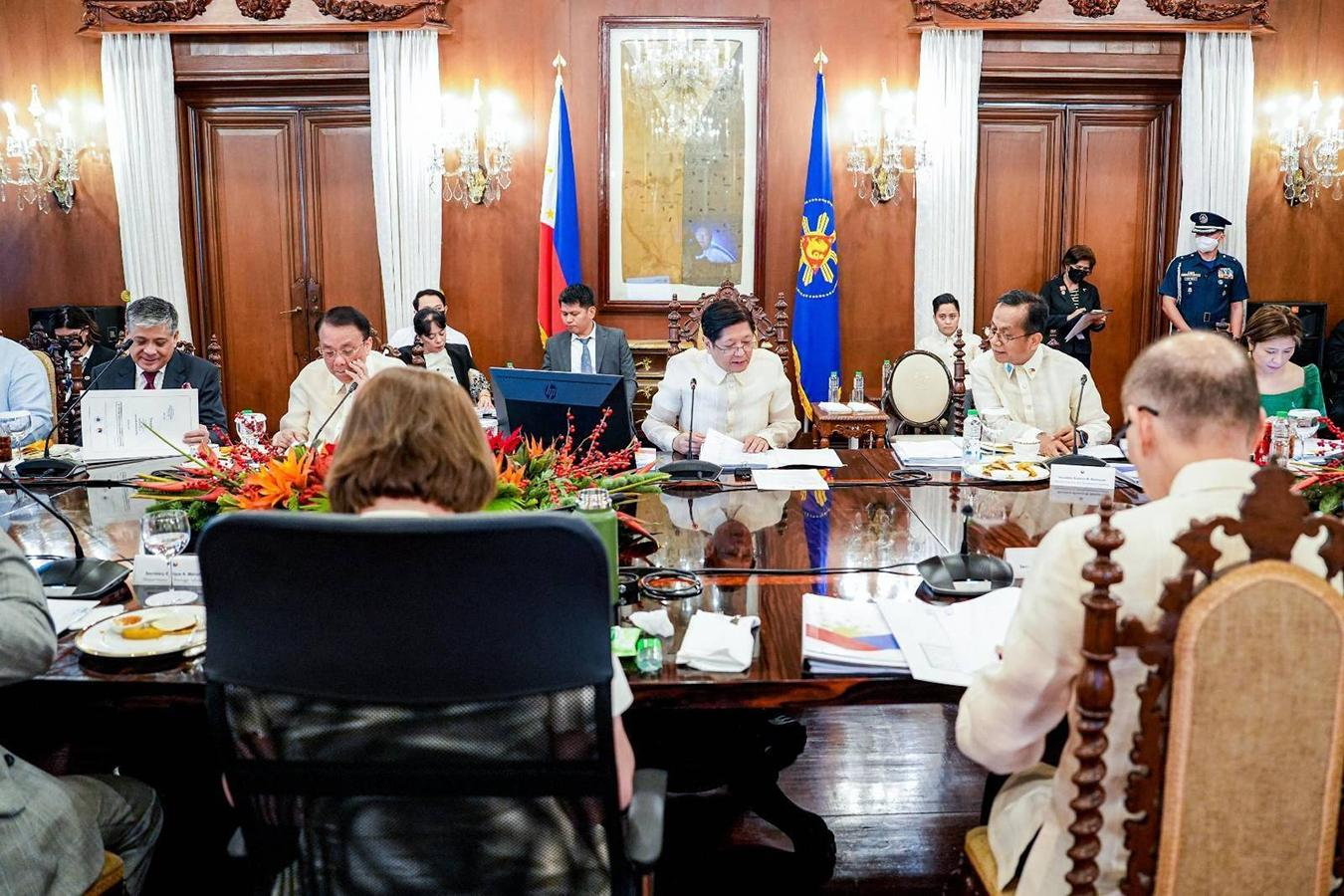
Marcos convenes a NEDA meeting at Malacañang Palace in December 2022, approving the Philippine Development Plan for 2023–2028.

The Marcos administration approved the inclusion of the Philippines to the Regional Comprehensive Economic Partnership (RCEP) free trade agreement, which was ratified by the Senate on February 21, 2023. His administration also formed the Private Sector Advisory Council, a council that will advise the President on economic affairs.

Marcos issued an executive order suspending e-sabong (online cockfighting) operations in the country. He also issued an executive order banning Philippine offshore gaming operators (POGOs), citing concerns for national security. Residential condominiums and offices markets were severely affected following the POGO ban, which saw a vacancy rate of up to 20.5% following the surrender of spaces and non-renewals of leases from POGOs.

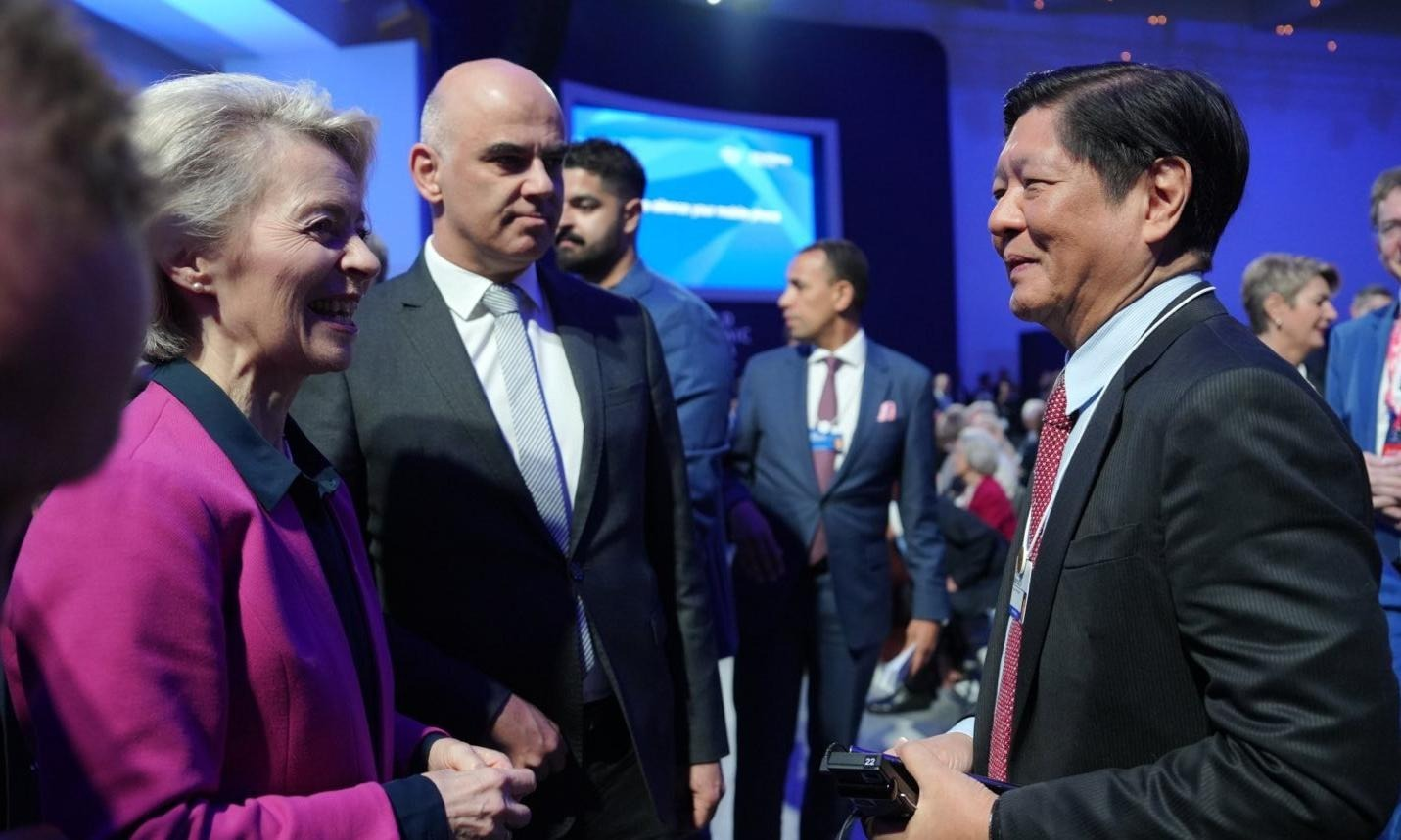
Marcos with European Commission president Ursula von der Leyen and Swiss president Alain Berset at the World Economic Forum in Davos, Switzerland, in January 2023

In the early years of his presidency, he sought to prioritize the country's post-COVID-19 pandemic economy as highlighted by his economic agenda, lifting the lockdowns and facemask restrictions. His administration sought to target a 6.5 to 7.5% real gross domestic product (GDP) growth rate, with a 6.5 to 8% annual real GDP growth rate, a 9% or single-digit poverty rate by 2028, a 3% national government deficit-to-GDP ratio by 2028, lowering the country's debt-to-GDP ratio to less than 60% by 2025, and securing an upper middle-income status by 2024 with a US$4,256 income per capita, which is part of his 2023–2028 fiscal strategy. Marcos also supports the creation of additional economic zones in various areas of the country to attract investments and laid out plans to impose digital taxes and improve the country's tax compliance procedures which should improve revenue collections and cut the country's debts, while maintaining the country's disbursements at above 20 percent of its GDP.

==== Insurgency ====
To harmonize the Bangsamoro peace agreements of the 1976 Tripoli Agreement, the 1996 Final Peace Agreement and the 2014 Comprehensive Agreement on the Bangsamoro, the Office of the Presidential Adviser on Peace, Reconciliation and Unity facilitated the participation of the Moro National Liberation Front (MNLF) in the Bangsamoro Transition Authority (BTA). On August 14, 2022, Marcos appointed new members of the BTA, and included Abdulkarim Misuari and Nurrheda Misuari, son and daughter of Moro National Liberation Front leader Nur Misuari, in an effort to unite former warring members of the MNLF and the Moro Islamic Liberation Front under one Bangsamoro autonomous government.

==== Communist policy ====
Amid the weakening of the communist fronts by the military, in May 2023, Marcos directed the "recalibration" of the NTF-ELCAC, an anti-insurgency task force, to shift its previous "aggressive" policy and become "bringers of peace". Marcos appointed Vice President Sara Duterte as co-vice chair of the NTF-ELCAC. As part of his administration's peace initiatives, in November 2023, Marcos granted amnesty to former rebels of the Communist Party of the Philippines-New People's Army-National Democratic Front (CPP-NPA-NDF), Moro Islamic Liberation Front (MILF), and Moro National Liberation Front (MNLF); he also granted amnesty to members of the Rebolusyonaryong Partido ng Manggagawa ng Pilipinas/Revolutionary Proletarian Army/Alex Boncayao Brigade (RPMP-RPA-ABB).

In a reversal of Duterte's policy, the Marcos administration and the NDF issued a joint statement on November 28, 2023, announcing the revival of peace talks between the two parties, with the government side to be led by retired general Emmanuel Bautista and Special Presidential Assistant Antonio Lagdameo and the NDF side to be led by Luis Jalandoni. Vice President Duterte asked Marcos to reconsider the plan to hold peace talks which she called an "agreement with the devil", while Speaker Martin Romualdez deemed the decision to be a "moral imperative" for the country. Negotiations between the Marcos administration and the NDF began in Oslo as early as 2022, but were withheld from the public.

After the Supreme Court ruled in May 2024 that red-tagging threatens a person's right to life, liberty, or security, Human Rights Watch and Karapatan called on Marcos to abolish the NTF-ELCAC. Marcos rejected the calls for abolition, saying the task force was instrumental in reducing the country's internal security threat. In July 2024, Duterte resigned as co-vice chairperson of NTF-ELCAC.

==== Telecommunications ====
In 2022, the Marcos administration launched the BroadBand ng Masa Program (BBMP) to provide free WiFi connections in remote areas. To "boost government initiatives against scams committed through text and online messages", Marcos signed his first law, which mandated SIM card registration; by the end of the July 2023 deadline, a total of 113.9 million SIM cards were registered, and about 54 million unregistered mobile numbers were deactivated.

=== Foreign policy ===
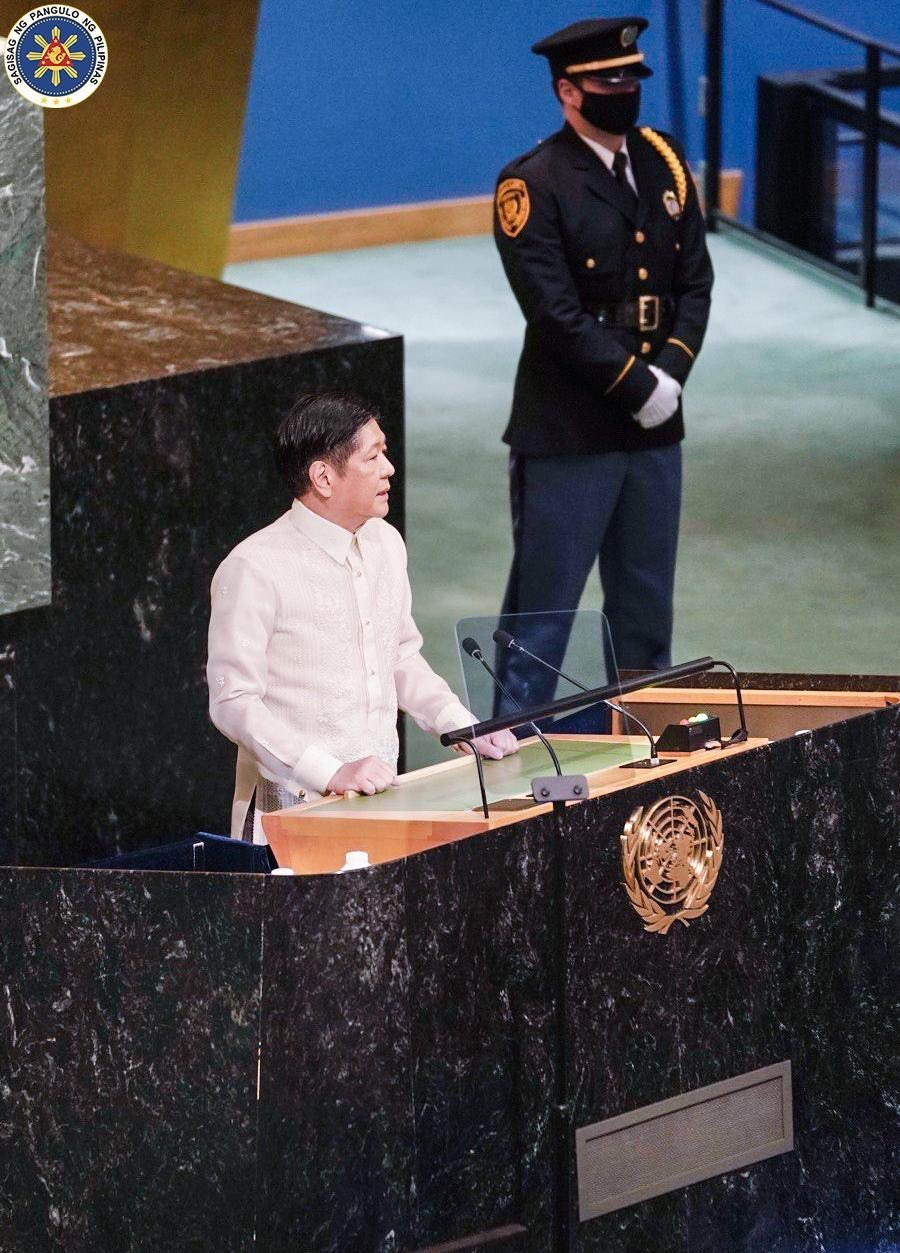
Marcos addresses the 77th session of the United Nations General Assembly on September 20, 2022.

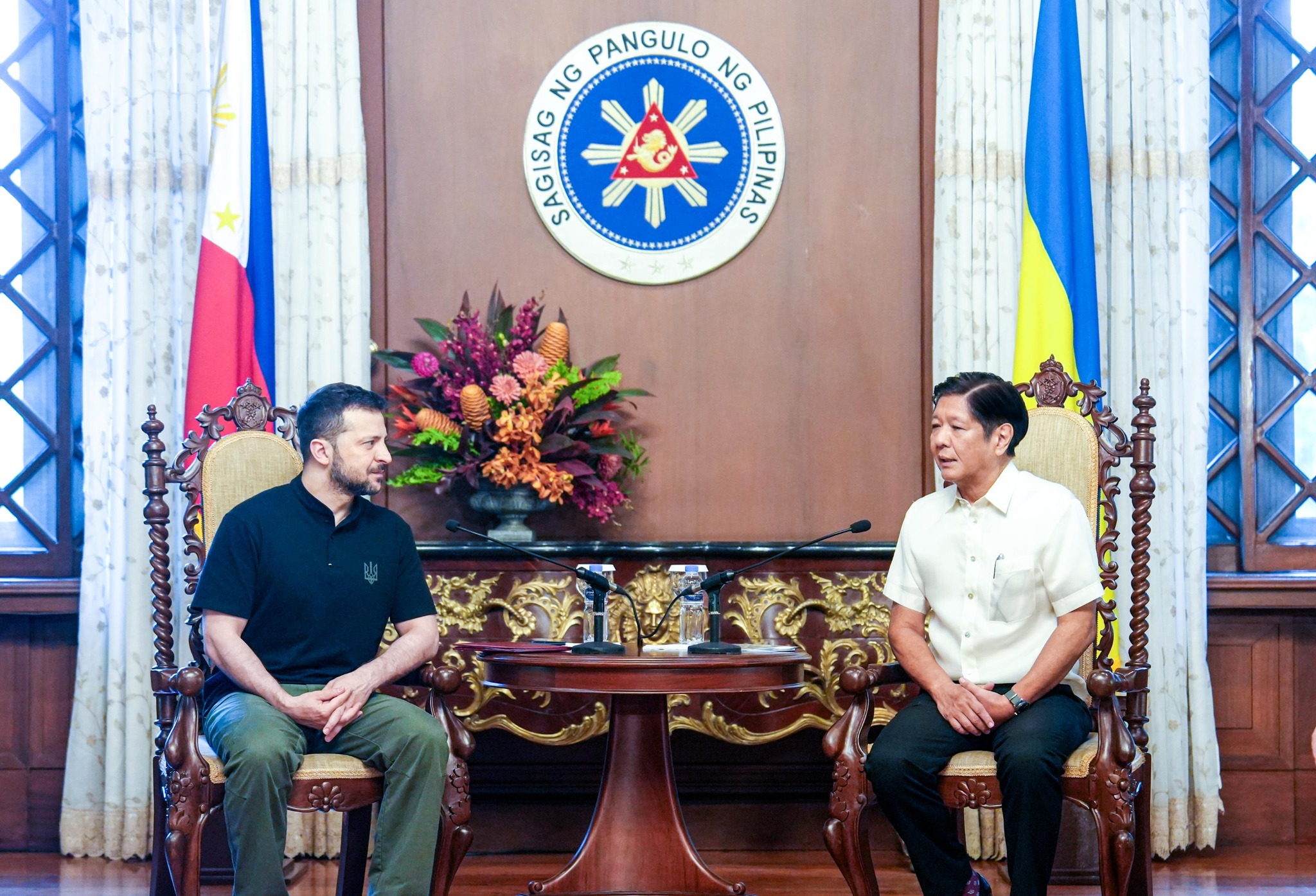
Marcos speaks with Ukrainian president Volodymyr Zelenskyy during the latter's visit to Manila on June 3, 2024.

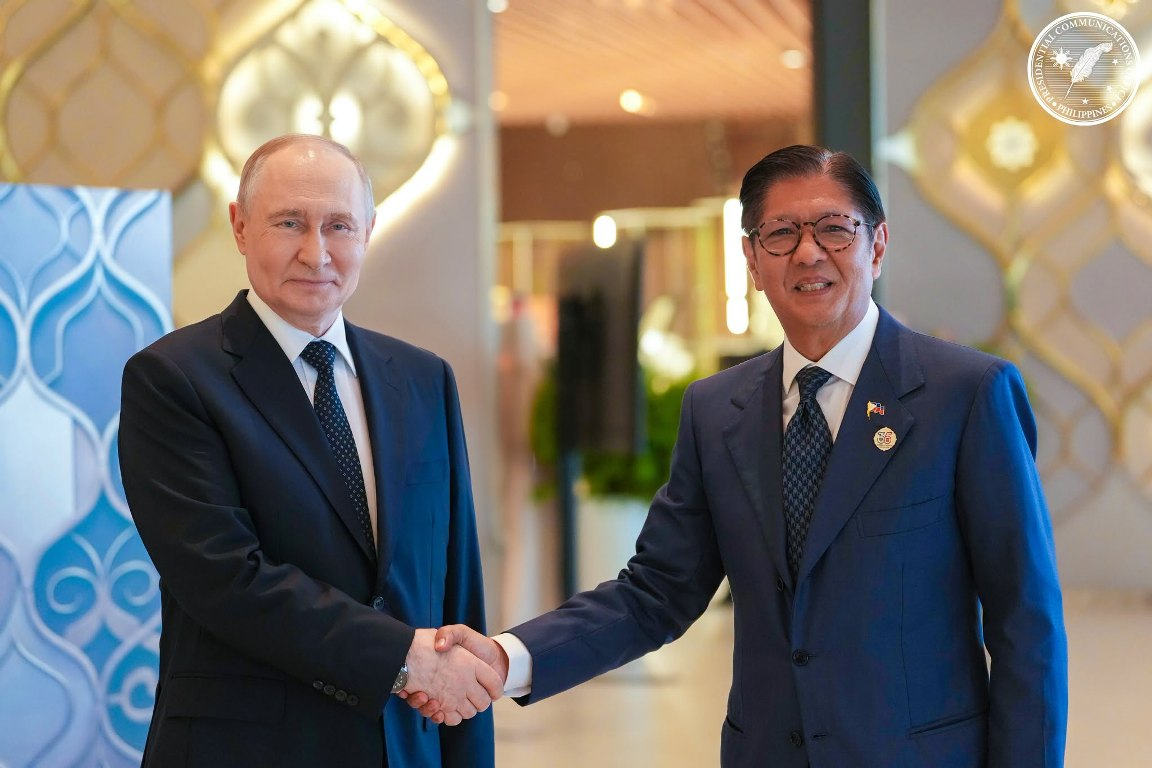
Marcos meets with Russian president Vladimir Putin during a visit to Kazan on June 18, 2026.

Early in his presidency, Marcos promised to continue his predecessor Rodrigo Duterte's foreign policy of being "friends to all, enemies to none". Marcos initially sought closer ties with China, but has since been increasingly seen as more pro-American than Duterte in an attempt to create a centrist-style balancing act between the two superpowers. During his first State of the Nation Address, Marcos promised to "not preside over any process that will abandon even one-square inch of territory of the Republic of the Philippines to any foreign power".

Under his presidency, Marcos intensified the Philippines' cooperation on both economic and defense arrangements to Western countries, such as the United States, Japan, Australia, and the European Union, while strengthening its defense posture within the region. Marcos approved the designation of four additional bases to be used by the United States military under the Enhanced Defense Cooperation Agreement. In May 2024, the Philippines and the United States held its largest Balikatan military exercises, fueling concerns from local civilians who fear they would be affected in any future war between the US and China. The deployment of the United States' Typhon Weapons System in an undisclosed location in northern Luzon also caught the attention of Russian president Vladimir Putin, who said that Russia should resume producing nuclear-capable missiles and consider where to deploy them.

Marcos called on all involved parties on the South China Sea to abide by the 1982 United Nations Convention on the Law of the Sea in order to diffuse potential conflicts in the future. Due to Marcos's "transparency thrust" in dealing with the aggressive actions of the Chinese Coast Guard and the Chinese Maritime Militia, China–Philippines relations have significantly deteriorated during Marcos's tenure, with increasing tensions over territorial disputes in the South China Sea and the Philippines withdrawing from the Belt and Road initiative.

=== Human rights ===
President Bongbong Marcos promised to uphold human rights during his term. The Philippines stated in 2022 that it was committed to cooperate with United Nations human rights mechanisms. The United Nations noted the failure of law enforcement to address human rights violations and recommended that the Philippines review all killings in the government's drug war.

Drug war killings, attacks on activists, harassment of media, and red-tagging have continued. During the first year of Bongbong Marcos's term, there were 336 drug war killings, mostly during police operations, and 8 cases of forced disappearances. In 2024, the Commission on Human Rights said that human rights violations under the Duterte and Bongbong Marcos presidencies were almost similar. The Defend NGO Alliance stated that the human rights situation may have worsened under Bongbong Marcos. The alliance called for the abolition of repressive agencies and policies, such as the National Task Force to End Local Communist Armed Conflict and the Anti-Terrorism Act.

As of November 2024, four journalists have been killed while doing their jobs under the Bongbong Marcos presidency. This includes broadcaster Percy Lapid who was red-tagged and subsequently killed near his home. Journalists also continue to be red-tagged, harassed, or jailed, such as Frenchie Mae Cumpio, who is detained on allegations of terror financing.

Congress representatives and human rights groups have urged the Bongbong Marcos administration to rejoin the Rome Statute and the International Criminal Court. As of March 2025, the government has refused to rejoin the International Criminal Court.

=== Impeachment complaint ===
On January 19, 2026, an impeachment complaint was filed against Marcos before the House of Representatives on charges related to the arrest of Rodrigo Duterte, his alleged drug use and involvement in the flood control scandal and issues over the national budget. The complaint was filed by lawyer Andre de Jesus and endorsed by Pusong Pinoy partylist representative Jett Nisay.

== Court cases ==
=== Income and estate tax case convictions ===
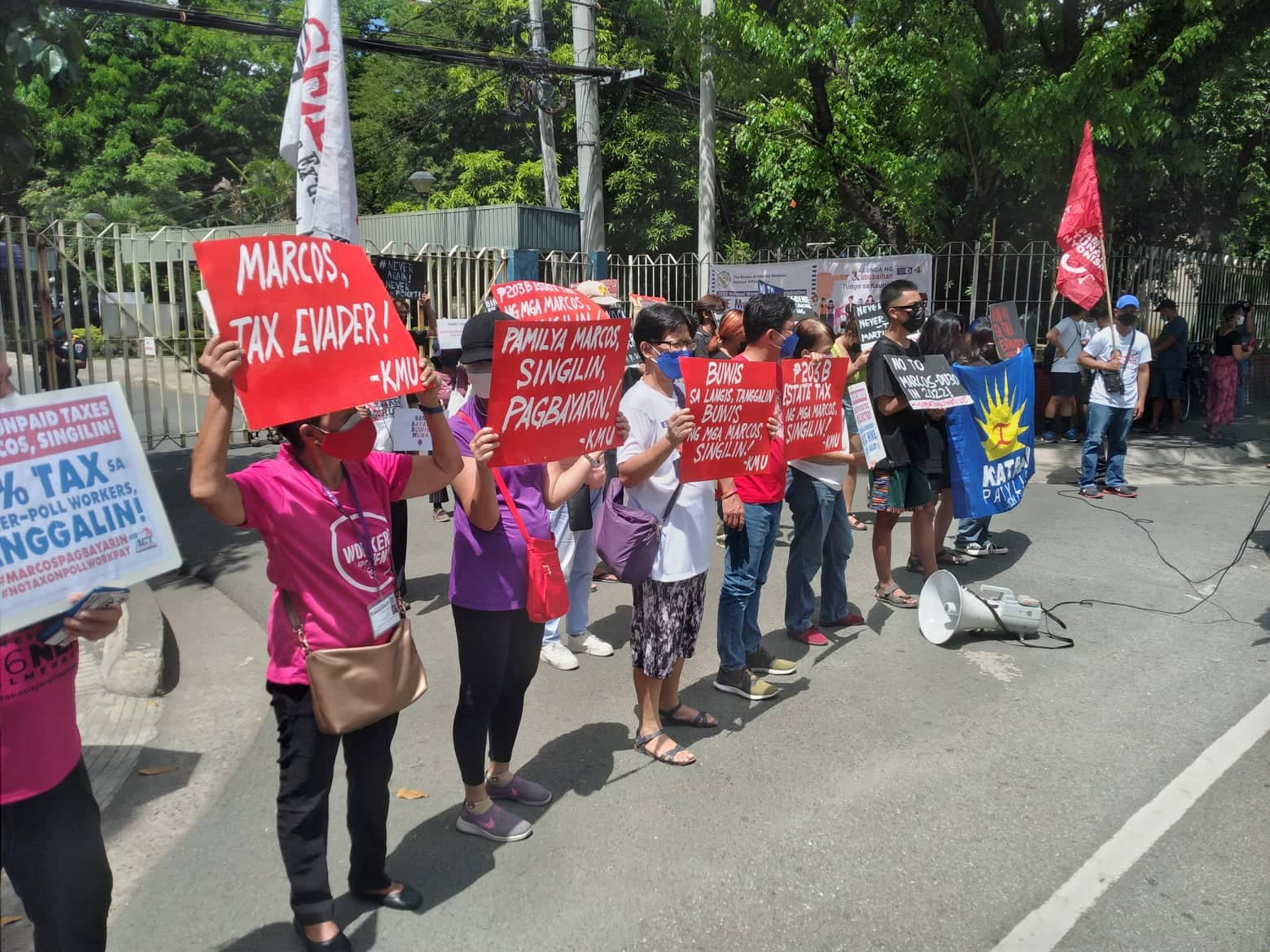
Protests against Marcos over his involvement in tax evasion in September 2022

On June 27, 1990, a special tax audit team of the Bureau of Internal Revenue (BIR) investigated the tax liabilities and obligations of the late Ferdinand Marcos, who died on September 29, 1989. The investigation disclosed in a 1991 memorandum that the Marcos family had failed to file estate tax returns and several income tax returns covering the years of 1982 to 1986 in violation of the National Internal Revenue Code.

The BIR also issued a deficiency estate tax assessment against the estate of the late Ferdinand Marcos in 1991 for unpaid estate taxes from 1982 to 1985, and 1985 to 1986, totaling ₱23,293,607,638 (₱97,792,696,739 in 2022). Formal assessment notices were served to Bongbong Marcos at his office at the Batasang Pambansa Complex on October 20, 1992, who was then the representative of the 2nd District of Ilocos Norte. Several notices of levy were also issued by the BIR February 22, 1993, to May 26, 1993, to satisfy the deficiency of estate tax returns, to no avail.

On March 12, 1993, lawyer Loreto Ata, representing Bongbong Marcos, called the attention of the BIR to notify them of any action taken by the BIR against his client. Bongbong Marcos then filed an instant petition on June 25, 1993, for certiorari and prohibition to contest the estate tax deficiency assessment.

On July 27, 1995, Quezon City Regional Trial Court Judge Benedicto Ulep convicted Marcos to seven years in jail and a fine of US$2,812 (₱138,491 in 2025) plus back taxes for tax evasion in his failure to file an income tax return from the period of 1982 to 1985 while sitting as the vice governor of Ilocos Norte (1980–1983) and as governor of Ilocos Norte (1983–1986). Marcos subsequently appealed the decision to the Court of Appeals over his conviction. However, in 1994, the Court of Appeals ruled that the estate tax deficiency assessment had become "final and unappealable", allowing it to be enforced.

On October 31, 1997, the Court of Appeals affirmed its earlier decision with Marcos being convicted for the failure of the filing of an income tax return under Section 45 of the National Internal Revenue Code of 1977 while being acquitted of tax evasion under the charge of violating Section 50 of the same statute. In spite of the removal of the penalty of imprisonment, Marcos was ordered the payment of back income taxes to the Bureau of Internal Revenue (BIR) with interest and the issuance of corresponding fines of ₱2,000 per count of non-filing of income tax returns from 1982 to 1984 and ₱30,000 for 1985, plus the accrued interest. Marcos later filed a petition for certiorari to the Supreme Court of the Philippines over the modified conviction imposed by the Court of Appeals but subsequently withdrew his petition on August 8, 2001, thereby declaring the ruling as final and executory.

In 2021, the Quezon City Regional Trial Court certified that there were no records on file of Marcos settling the corresponding tax dues and fines. However, according to Marcos's campaign team, documents issued by the Supreme Court, the BIR, and a receipt issued by the Land Bank of the Philippines state that the tax dues were paid, while elections commissioner Rowena Guanzon noted that the documents Marcos submitted to the Commission on Elections were not receipts of taxes paid to the BIR but rather receipts from the Land Bank for lease rentals. Nevertheless, the Commission on Elections ruled against the consolidated disqualification cases against Marcos and stated that "Further, to prove the absence of any ill-intention and bad faith on his part," Marcos submitted a Bureau of Internal Revenue certification and an official receipt from the Landbank, showing his compliance with the CA decision directing him to pay deficiency income taxes amounting to a little over ₱67,000, including fines and surcharges.

The estate tax deficiency assessment issued by the BIR has remained uncollected since the Supreme Court ruling on October 12, 1991. Since the ruling of the Supreme Court in 1997 which had junked the petition of Marcos to contest the estate tax deficiency assessment, under the Ramos, Arroyo, Aquino, and Duterte administrations, the BIR has issued renewed written demands on the Marcos family to pay the estate tax liabilities, which has remained unpaid. As a result, the estate tax deficiency assessment, with penalties, is estimated to have ballooned to ₱203,819,066,829 (₱203.819 billion) as of 2021.

The unpaid estate tax return was used as grounds in one petition to cancel Marcos's certificate of candidacy for president in the 2022 elections. On March 1, 2022, presidential candidate and Manila mayor Isko Moreno said that he would implement the Supreme Court ruling ordering the Marcos family to pay their estate tax debts if elected, vowing to use the proceeds as relief aid (ayuda) for victims of the COVID-19 pandemic. Ernest Ramel, the secretary general of Aksyon Demokratiko, the party of Moreno continuously called out BIR about the issue.

On March 28, 2022, Senator Koko Pimentel filed Senate Resolution No. 998, stating an urgent and pressing need for the Senate to look into why the estate tax has remained uncollected for almost 25 years, which the amount has already been ruled to be due and demandable against the heirs of his father.

=== 2007 Payanig sa Pasig property case motion ===
On June 19, 2007, Marcos Jr. filed a motion to intervene in, OCLP v. PCGG, Civil Case Number 0093 at the Sandiganbayan, the Philippines' anti-graft court. The case had been filed by Ortigas & Company, Ltd. Partnership (OCLP) against the Presidential Commission on Good Government (PCGG) over the 18-hectare (44-acre) former Payanig sa Pasig property bordering Ortigas Avenue, Julia Vargas Avenue, and Meralco Avenue in Ortigas Center, Pasig, which had been the site of the 'Payanig sa Pasig' theme park, but is now the location of various businesses, most notably the Metrowalk shopping and recreation complex.

The PCGG considers the property the "crown jewel" among the properties sequestered from the Marcoses' ill-gotten wealth, estimating its minimum value to be about ₱16.5 billion in March 2015. The property had been surrendered to the PCGG in 1986, as part of the settlement deal of Marcos crony Jose Yao Campos, who was holding the property under various companies on Marcos Sr.'s behalf. Ortigas & Company countered that Marcos Sr. had coerced them to sell the property to him in 1968. Marcos Jr.'s motion claimed that his father had bought the property legally, but the Sandiganbayan dismissed his motion on October 18, 2008, saying it had already dismissed a similar motion filed years earlier by his mother Imelda.

=== 2011 Hawaii contempt judgement ===
In 2011, the Hawaii District Court ruled Bongbong Marcos and his mother Imelda Marcos to be in contempt, fining them US$353.6 million (₱17,414,799,999.93 in 2025) fine for not respecting an injunction from a 1992 judgement in a human rights victims case, which commanded them not to dissipate the assets of Ferdinand Marcos's estate. The ruling was upheld by the US Ninth Circuit Court of Appeals on October 24, 2012, and is believed to be "the largest contempt award ever affirmed by an appellate court." While the 1992 case was against Ferdinand Marcos, the 2011 judgment was against Imelda and Bongbong personally. The judgement also effectively barred Imelda and Bongbong from entering any US territory. However, on June 9, 2022, United States Deputy Secretary of State Wendy Sherman clarified in a roundtable discussion with local reporters during a state visit, that as a head of state, Marcos enjoys diplomatic immunity in all circumstances, stating that he is welcome to visit the United States under his official role.

== Political views ==
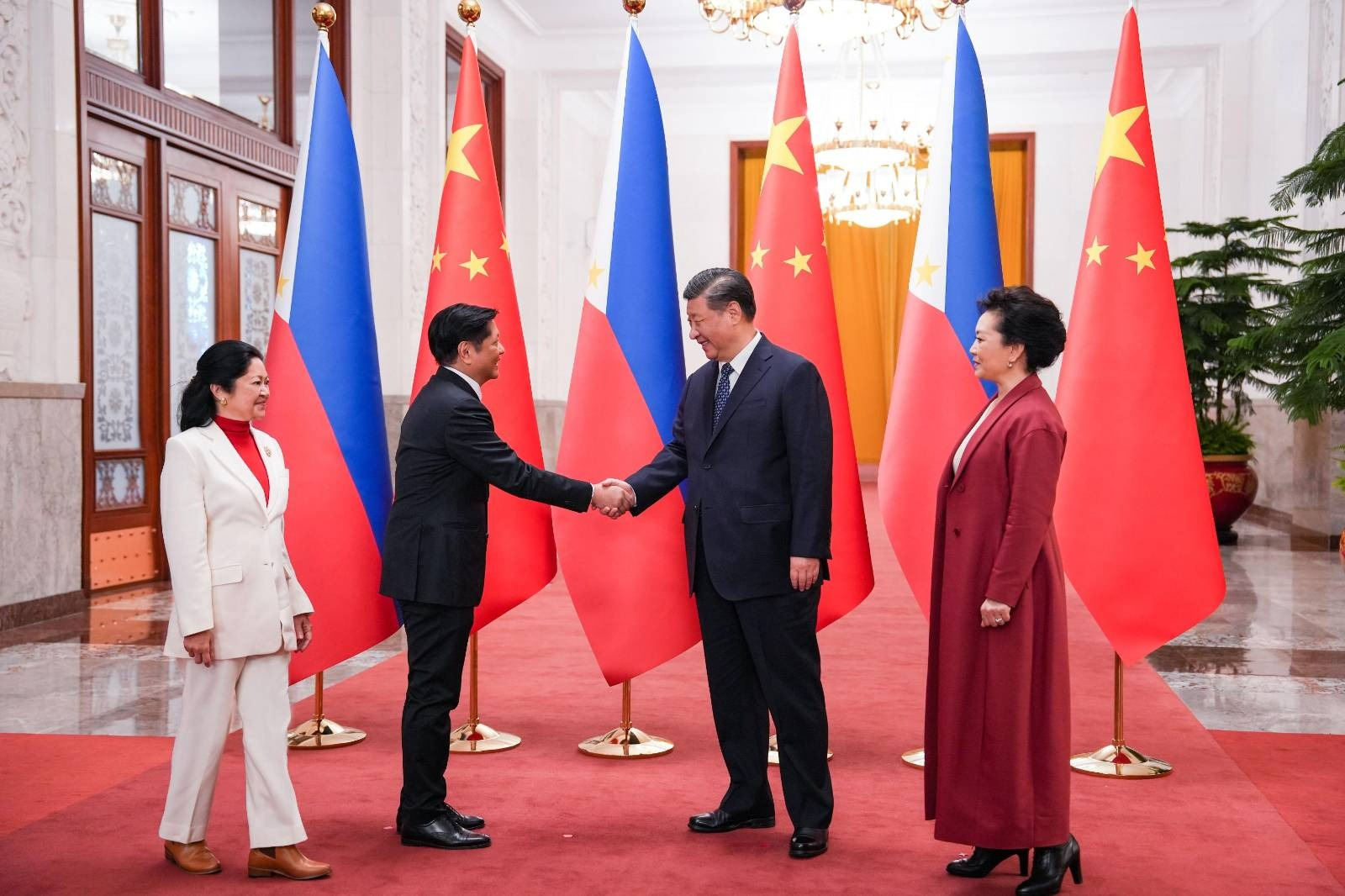
The Marcos couple meets Chinese leader Xi Jinping and Peng Liyuan in Beijing in January 2023.

Marcos has described his political views as "conservative" and "Machiavellian". He has also described the "spirit of nationalism" as a force driving progress in the Philippines. Before taking office, Marcos has been described in media reports as a populist. On social issues, he is in favor of legalizing abortion for rape and incest victims as well as divorce and same-sex unions. Marcos is also opposed to reinstating the death penalty for convicted heinous criminals and lowering the minimum age of criminal responsibility to 12. In terms of economic policy, analysts initially speculated that Marcos would pursue liberal policies as opposed to his protectionist rhetoric during the presidential campaign.

=== Marcos–Duterte feud ===
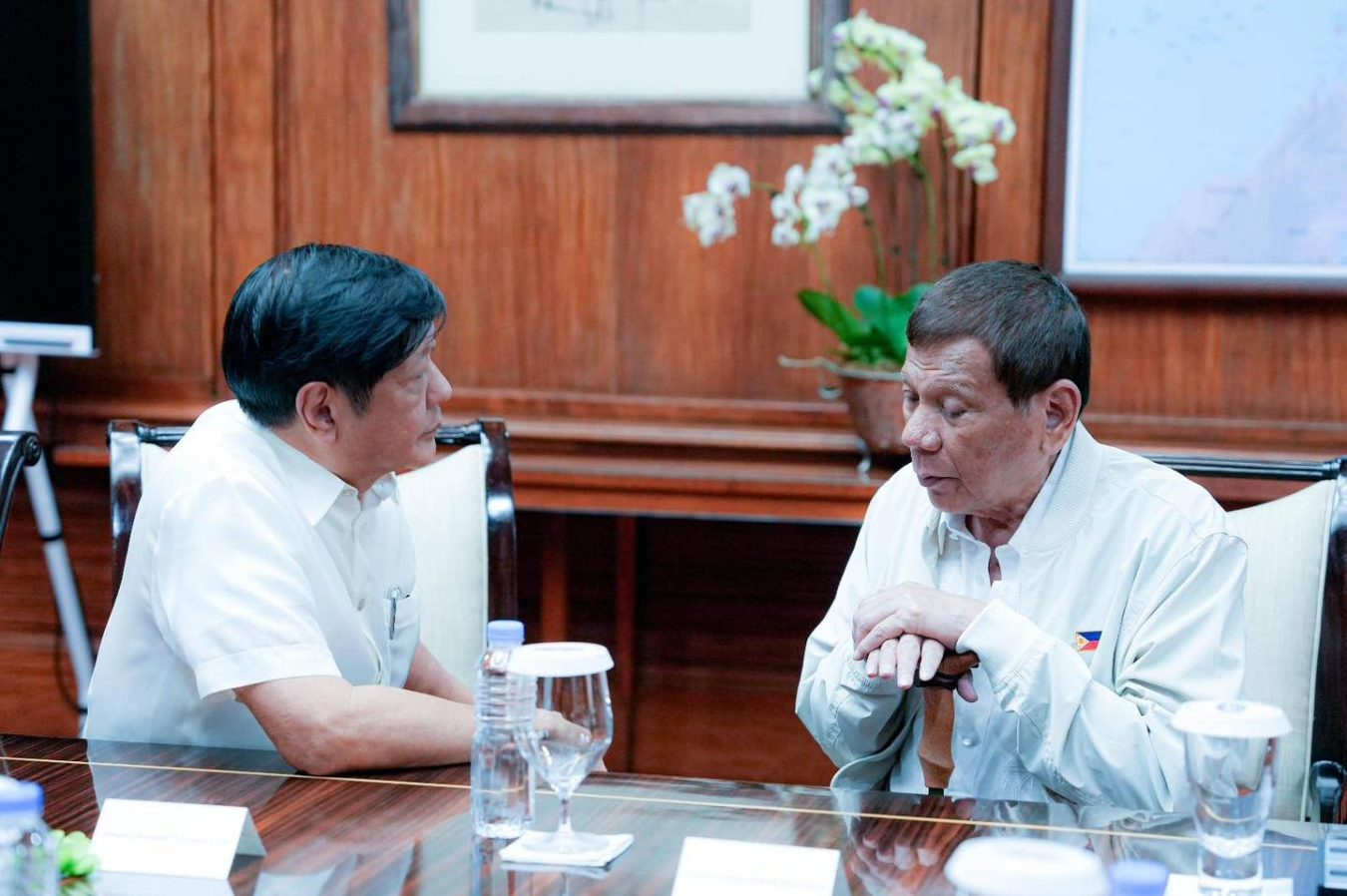
Marcos with his predecessor, Rodrigo Duterte, at Malacañang in August 2023

Amid the feud of the Marcos and Duterte clans in late April 2023, House Speaker and Marcos's cousin Martin Romualdez said the House of Representatives will probe into an agreement former president Rodrigo Duterte made during his presidency with Chinese leader Xi Jinping. Under the agreement, Duterte agreed to maintain the "status quo" in the South China Sea to avoid escalating a war. Political analyst Ronald Llamas said the probe was engineered by Marcos as a "political payback" to Duterte's verbal attacks and to reduce Duterte's political influence ahead of the 2025 midterm elections. The 2025 Philippine general election saw mixed to unfavorable results for Marcos.

In 2024, Duterte criticized the Marcos administration's curtailment of the freedom of speech in violation of the 1987 Bill of Rights. Duterte's nationwide "Hakbang ng Maisug" (brave) prayer rallies, which Duterte said the Marcos administration deliberately aimed to thwart, suffered setbacks and cancellations. Duterte, however, said he prayed for Marcos to survive until the end of his term since Duterte does not want himself or his daughter Sara to become president.

In June 2024, Vice President Sara Duterte resigned from the Marcos cabinet and grew critical of Marcos. Her first public criticism of Marcos was during the 39th anniversary celebration of Kingdom of Jesus Christ within Davao City in late August 2024 during the police search for Apollo Quiboloy, where she admitted her regret in supporting Marcos' candidacy as president. In November 2024, Philippine authorities subpoenaed Vice President Duterte after she threatened to have Marcos, his wife Liza, and House Speaker Romualdez assassinated if she were killed. Without naming Duterte, Marcos condemned any sort of "criminal plans" and increased his security, while National Security Adviser Eduardo Año called the threats a national security concern. She was ordered to appear before the National Bureau of Investigation, with such statements potentially leading to criminal charges. Marcos, however, expressed openness to the possibility of reconciling with Duterte. Despite growing calls for Sara Duterte's impeachment, Marcos has repeatedly voiced his opinion against impeaching her, calling it "a storm in a teacup" and considering the move inconsequential to the lives of Filipinos.

On March 11, 2025, Rodrigo Duterte was detained in Manila, following an arrest warrant from the International Criminal Court stemming from an investigation of human rights abuses during Duterte's anti-drug campaign.

== Public profile ==
In 2024, Time magazine listed him as one of the world's 100 most influential people.

=== Historical distortionism ===
As with other Marcos family members who have stayed in the public eye since their return to the Philippines, Marcos has received significant criticism for instances of historical denialism, and his trivialization of the human rights violations and economic plunder that took place during the Marcos administration, and of the role he played in the administration. Specific criticisms have been leveled at Marcos for being unapologetic for human rights violations and ill-gotten wealth during his father's administration. Of the human rights victims, Marcos Jr. said of them in 1999: "They don't want an apology, they want money." He then proceeded to state that his family would apologize only if they had done something wrong.

When victims of human rights abuses during his father's administration commemorated the 40th year of the proclamation of martial law in 2012, Marcos Jr. dismissed their calls for an apology for the atrocities as "self-serving statements by politicians, self-aggrandizement narratives, pompous declarations, and political posturing and propaganda." In the Sydney Morning Herald later that year, Bongbong cited the various court decisions against the Marcos family as a reason not to apologize for Martial Law abuses, saying "we have a judgment against us in the billions. What more would people want?"

During his 2016 vice presidential campaign, Marcos responded to then-president Benigno Aquino III's criticism of the Marcos regime and call to oppose his election run. He dismissed the events, saying Filipinos should "leave history to the professors." This prompted over 500 faculty, staff and history professors from the Ateneo de Manila University to immediately issue a statement condemning his dismissive retort as part of "an ongoing willful distortion of our history," and a "shameless refusal to acknowledge the crimes of the Martial Law regime." More than 1,400 Catholic schools, through the Catholic Educational Association of the Philippines (CEAP), later joined the call of the Ateneo faculty "against the attempt of [Marcos] to canonize the harrowing horrors of martial rule." This was also followed by the University of the Philippines Diliman's Department of History, which released a statement of its own, decrying what they called a "dangerous" effort for Marcos to create "myth and deception."

On September 20, 2018, Marcos Jr. released a YouTube video showing a tête-à-tête between him and former senate president Juan Ponce Enrile, who had been his father's defense minister before playing a key role in his ouster during the 1986 EDSA revolution. The video made a number of claims, which were quickly refuted and denounced by martial law victims, including former senate president Aquilino Pimentel Jr., former DSWD secretary Judy Taguiwalo, former Commission on Human Rights chair Etta Rosales, and writer Boni Ilagan, among others. Enrile later backpedaled from some of his claims, attributing them to "unlucid intervals."

=== Online presence ===
According to research by Vera Files, Marcos benefited the most from fake news from the Philippines in 2017, along with President Rodrigo Duterte. Most viral news were driven by shares on networks of Facebook pages. Also, most Philippine audience Facebook pages and groups spreading online disinformation bore "Duterte", "Marcos" or "News" in their names and are pro-Duterte.

In July 2020, Brittany Kaiser alleged in an interview that Marcos had approached the controversial firm Cambridge Analytica in order to "rebrand" the Marcos family image on social media. Marcos's spokesperson Vic Rodriguez denied these allegations and stated that Marcos is considering filing libel charges against Rappler, which published Kaiser's interview.

=== Impostor urban legend ===
Between the late 70s and early 80s, an urban legend became popular claiming that Marcos Jr. was stabbed and died during a scuffle while studying abroad. The Marcos family allegedly looked for Bongbong's look-alike to replace him. This was later debunked by Marcos in one of his vlogs. The origins of this urban legend remain unknown.

=== Tallano gold myth ===
In 1990, during a coverage of Imelda Marcos's trial in New York, Inquirer journalist Kristina Luz interviewed then-33-year-old exiled Bongbong Marcos and asked where the Marcos wealth came from. Marcos responded "only I know where the gold is and how to get it". This was corroborated in a 1992 report by the Associated Press that quoted Imelda Marcos saying that her husband's wealth came "from the Japanese and other gold he found after World War II, and not from the Philippine coffers." In 2007, Marcos informed the anti-graft court Sandiganbayan that his father's wealth came from trading "precious metals more specifically gold from the years 1946 to 1954" when he tried to win back the Ortigas Payanig property in Pasig from the national government.

The myth surrounding the gold allegedly owned by the Marcos family has been the subject of various misinformation, as in 2011, a Facebook post claimed that a certain "Tallano clan" had paid Ferdinand Marcos in gold for his legal services. Several years later, supporters of the Marcos family in a Facebook page called "Marcos Cyber Warriors" also claimed that Marcos Sr.'s wealth came from his former law client, the "Maharlikan Tallano family".

This has resulted in a long-running belief that should Bongbong Marcos win as president, he will give Filipinos a share of this gold. However during his Philippine presidential election campaign in the 2022 elections, when asked over One News to verify the mythical "Tallano gold" or the long-believed tale that they got a share of the Japanese Yamashita gold, Marcos denied knowledge of it, even joking that "people should let him know if they see any of that gold". The urban myth had allegedly been suggested or carried by various social media pages being run by Marcos supporters in order to engage more people to support his presidential bid.

== Personal life ==
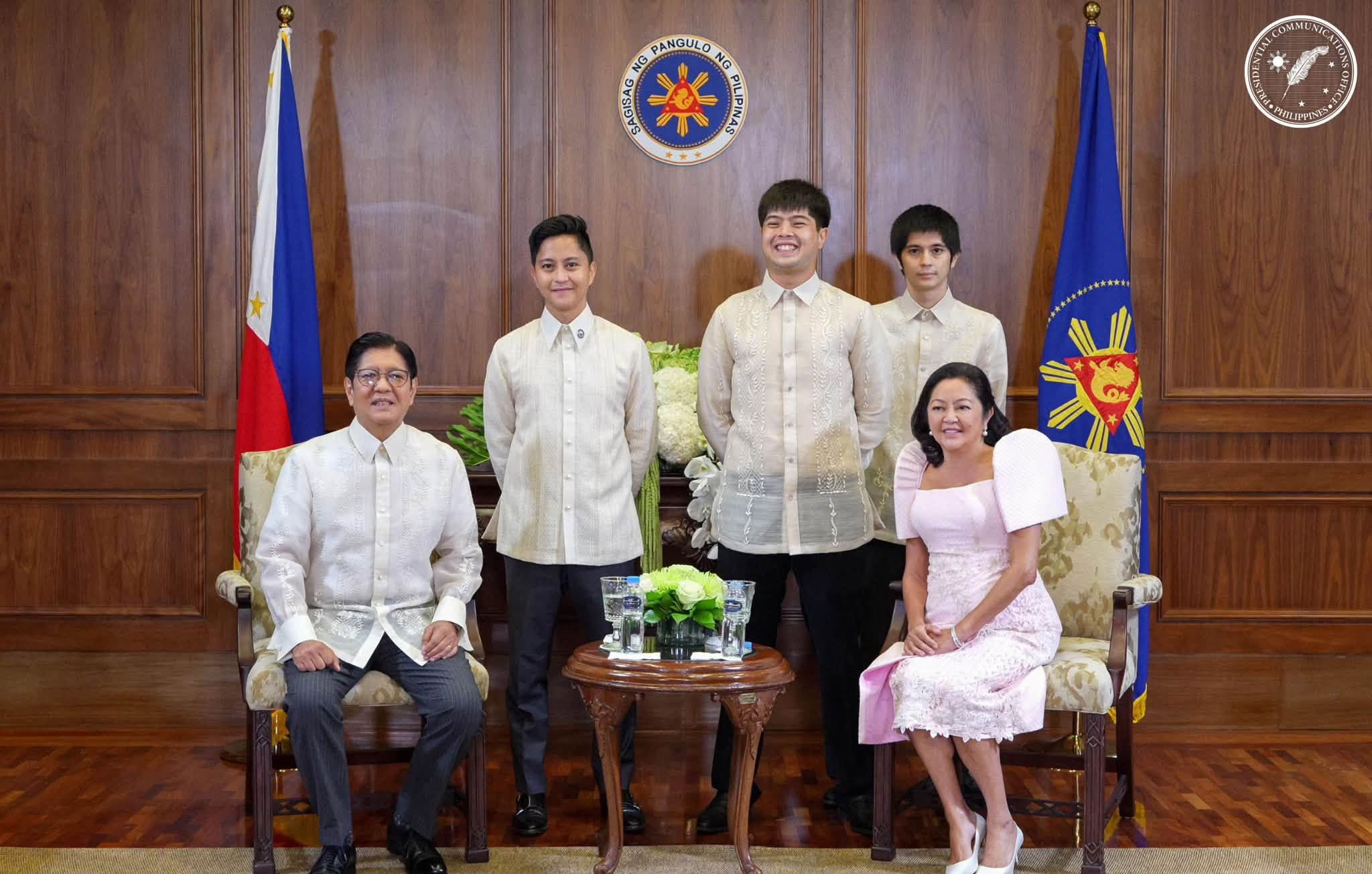
The first family at the sideline of the 2026 State of the Nation Address on July 27

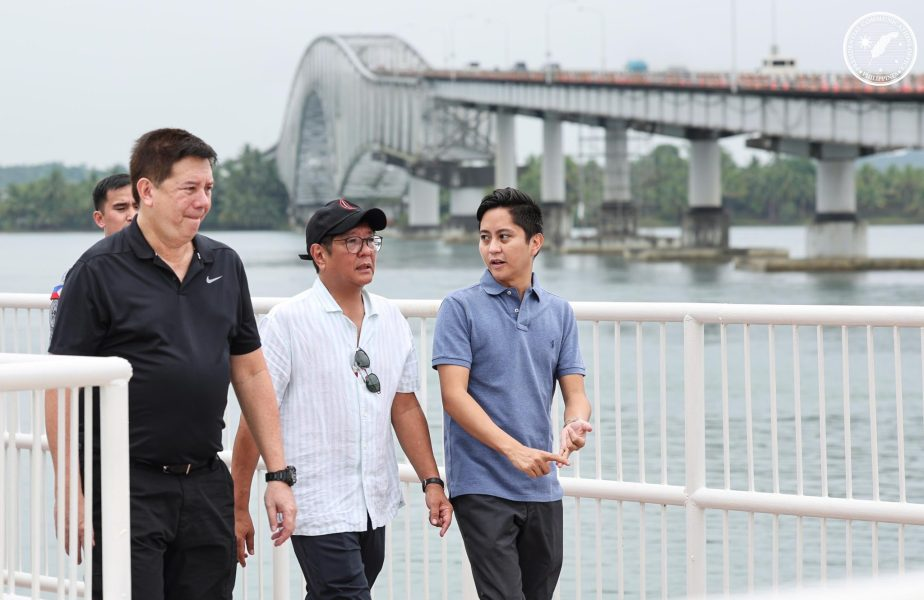
Marcos (center) inspecting the San Juanico Bridge with his eldest son, Sandro (right), and his cousin, Tacloban mayor Alfred Romualdez (left), on June 11, 2025.

Marcos is married to lawyer Louise "Liza" Cacho Araneta, a member of the prominent Araneta family. Marcos and Araneta were married in Fiesole, Italy, on April 17, 1993. They have three sons: Ferdinand Alexander III "Sandro" (born 1994), Joseph Simon (born 1995) and William Vincent "Vinny" (born 1997). Although he is Ilocano by ethnic ancestry, he was brought up in a Manileño household and does not speak the Ilocano language. The Marcos family maintains a residence in Forbes Park, Makati.

Aside from his common nickname "Bongbong", Marcos is known by his peers as "Bonggets". Marcos is an avid listener of rock and roll, rhythm and blues, and jazz music. He once held a record collection in Malacañang Palace that he described as "the best record collection in the Philippines" but left it when his family was exiled from the country in 1986. He is a fan of the Beatles, citing Sgt. Pepper's Lonely Hearts Club Band as his favorite album of theirs, and often collects the band's memorabilia. Marcos can also play the saxophone.

Marcos exercises regularly and claims to abstain from consuming confections and soft drinks, and also enjoys cooking. Marcos is also an avid reader, a cinephile, and a gun enthusiast, where he holds a competition under his name. Marcos also follows Formula One racing as a supporter of Scuderia Ferrari; during his presidency, he attended the 2022, 2023, and 2026 Singapore Grands Prix.

On March 31, 2020, Marcos's spokesperson confirmed that Marcos had tested positive for COVID-19. Prior to getting tested, Marcos was reportedly experiencing chest pains after coming home from a trip to Spain. He has since recovered from the disease after testing negative on a RT-PCR test on May 5, 2020, a month after testing positive for COVID-19. On July 8, 2022, Marcos's press secretary confirmed that Marcos had tested positive again for COVID-19 after experiencing slight fever.

In January 2026, Marcos was diagnosed with diverticulitis.

=== Alleged cocaine usage ===
On November 18, 2021, President Rodrigo Duterte claimed in a televised speech that a certain candidate for the 2022 Philippine presidential election is allegedly using cocaine, hinting at the candidate using male pronouns on several instances. Furthermore, Duterte alleged that the candidate eluded law enforcement authorities by doing drugs on a private yacht and a plane. Although he did not name the candidate, it was alluded that Duterte was referring to Marcos after he continued on his speech that the male candidate is a "weak leader" and has been "capitalizing on his father's accomplishments". Prior to that, Duterte previously named Marcos a "weak leader who had done nothing" and a "spoiled child for being an only son".

Days after Duterte's allegation, Marcos took a cocaine drug test through a urine sample at St. Luke's Medical Center – Global City and submitted the negative result to law enforcement authorities with a follow-up online memo by the medical institution confirming the legitimacy of the test.

Marcos responded that he did not feel that he was the one alluded to by President Duterte. According to health care provider American Addiction Centers, after the last use, cocaine or its metabolites can show up on a blood or saliva test for up to two days, a urine test for up to three days, and a hair test for months to years. In an interview with CNN Philippines in April 2022, Marcos responded to Duterte's remarks on him being a "spoiled" and "weak leader", saying that the president was "playing politics" and was "always making sure everybody's thinking hard about what they're doing".

In an interview with ANC in May 2022, former senator Nikki Coseteng, who claimed to personally know Marcos, alleged that Marcos was a "lazy individual" who frequented discos and got high on illegal substances along with his socialite friends during his youth. Marcos has neither denied nor confirmed Coseteng's allegations.

In late January 2024, Marcos's alleged cocaine use was brought anew by Duterte, during a prayer rally against Charter change in Davao City. Duterte alleged that Marcos had once been included in the Philippine Drug Enforcement Agency's (PDEA) drug watchlist (which the agency denied) and had been spotted using cocaine with his cohorts at a giant banana firm's plantation in Davao del Norte when Duterte was Mayor. Duterte said that these companions of Marcos were already working for his administration, and cited this as the reason why he did not vote for him in the 2022 general election. When asked by Marcos to prove the allegations, Duterte retorted that it is incumbent upon him to prove the allegations by taking a drug test, since he is the one holding public office. Marcos maintained he had never used illegal narcotics, let alone cocaine, and blamed Duterte's use of fentanyl as a response. In Duterte's defense, he had used fentanyl because it was prescribed to him by a "Dr. Javier", his alleged physician at St. Luke's Medical Center – Quezon City, to alleviate pain from injuries sustained in a motorbike accident a few years ago.

In April 2024, leaked documents from the Philippine Drug Enforcement Agency (PDEA) circulated online, linking Marcos and actress Maricel Soriano to illegal drugs. The Senate Committee on Public Order and Dangerous Drugs, headed by Senator Ronald dela Rosa, later conducted a hearing on the matter and invited vlogger Maharlika to explain her involvement in the online circulation of the documents. Former PDEA investigation agent Jonathan Morales declared that the documents were authentic; PDEA Director General Moro Virgilio Lazo, on the other hand, claimed the documents were fake.

On May 20, 2024, the Philippine Senate Committee on Public Order and Dangerous Drugs panel cited PDEA agent Jonathan Morales in contempt for '"continuously lying". Upon Jinggoy Estrada's motion and seconded by Ronald dela Rosa, Morales was ordered detained for flipped-flopped replies on PDS, inter alia. Earlier, a former National Police Commission officer, Eric "Pikoy" Santiago was also held in contempt of the Senate for being a "liar". On May 23, 2024, Morales and Santiago were released from custody according to Senate Sergeant-at-Arms Roberto Ancan. In August 2024, San Fernando, Pampanga Municipal Trial Court Branch 9 Acting Presiding Judge Jason Alquiroz convicted Morales of perjury and sentenced him to four months imprisonment and fined ₱1,000.

In November 2025, Marcos' sister Imee alleged that their family knew about Marcos' use of illegal drugs, stating during a three-day Iglesia ni Cristo rally in Manila that "when Bongbong and I were still kids, the whole family already knew about his problem. In truth, the testimonies of my father regarding his attitude and actions can be read by everyone. Before, he was not my responsibility because we still had a father. Growing up, [he] became more concerning."

== Honors ==
- Japan:
  - May 22, 2026: Grand Cordon of the Order of the Chrysanthemum

=== Honorary Degrees ===
- Honorary Doctor of Laws degree from the Pamantasan ng Lungsod ng Maynila (PLM) in 2026

=== Recognitions ===
- Time 100 Most Influential People in 2024

== Electoral history ==
Electoral history of Bongbong Marcos
Year	Office	Party	Votes received				Result
Year	Office	Party	Total	%	P.	Swing	Result
1980	Vice Governor of Ilocos Norte	KBL	—N/a	—N/a	1st	—N/a	Unopposed
1992	Representative (Ilocos Norte–2nd)	KBL	76,605	91.10%	1st	—N/a	Won
2007	Representative (Ilocos Norte–2nd)	KBL	5,116	—N/a	1st	—N/a	Unopposed
1998	Governor of Ilocos Norte	KBL	173,810	80.43%	1st	—N/a	Won
2001	Governor of Ilocos Norte	KBL	201,247	100.00%	1st	+19.57	Unopposed
2004	Governor of Ilocos Norte	KBL	111,657	100.00%	1st	0.00	Unopposed
1995	Senator of the Philippines	KBL	8,168,768	31.74%	16th	—N/a	Lost
2010	Senator of the Philippines	Nacionalista	13,169,634	34.52%	7th	+2.78	Won
2016	Vice President of the Philippines	IND (Note: Member of Nacionalista Party but ran as an independent candidate.)	14,155,344	34.47%	2nd	—N/a	Lost
2022	President of the Philippines	PFP	31,629,783	58.77%	1st	—N/a	Won

== See also ==
- List of current heads of state and government
- List of heads of the executive by approval rating
- Marcos loyalism

== Notes ==
Political offices
Preceded by Elizabeth M. Keon	Governor of Ilocos Norte; 1983–1986	Succeeded by Castor Raval; Officer-in-charge
Preceded by Rodolfo Fariñas	Governor of Ilocos Norte; 1998–2007	Succeeded by Michael Marcos Keon
Preceded by Rodrigo Duterte	President of the Philippines; 2022–present	Incumbent
Preceded by William Dar	Secretary of Agriculture; 2022–2023	Succeeded by Francisco Tiu Laurel Jr.
House of Representatives of the Philippines
Preceded by Mariano Nalupta Jr.	Member of the House of Representatives from Ilocos Norte's 2nd district 1992–1995	Succeeded by Simeon Valdez
Preceded by Imee Marcos	Member of the House of Representatives from Ilocos Norte's 2nd district 2007–2010	Succeeded by Imelda Marcos
Order of precedence
First	Order of Precedence of the Philippines as President	Succeeded by Sara Duterte as Vice President
Party political offices
Preceded by Abubakar Mangelen	National Chairman of the Partido Federal ng Pilipinas; 2021–present	Incumbent
First	Partido Federal ng Pilipinas nominee for President of the Philippines; 2022	Most recent
Diplomatic posts
Preceded by Anwar Ibrahim	Chairperson of the ASEAN; 2025	Incumbent
