= 2010 United States tomato shortage =

Shortage of tomatoes in the United States between March and April 2010

- Time: March 2010–April 2010
- Duration: 1 month
- Location: United States
- Cause: Cold weather in Florida
- Outcome: Restaurants limit use; Supermarket rationing; Price increase

The 2010 United States tomato shortage was a shortage of tomatoes in the United States between March and April 2010 caused by unseasonably cold weather in Florida in January 2010 which destroyed 60-70% of the state's tomato crop. There was also a shortage of tomatoes over the new year holiday, caused by the Californian harvest finishing before the Florida harvest began.

The shortage caused several fast food chains to stop offering tomatoes unless requested and supermarkets rationed their supplies.

Prices for tomatoes in the Eastern United States reached prices several times the cost prior to the crop loss. Wholesale prices rose from around $7 for a 25 lb box to $30. During the shortage, more tomatoes were imported from Canada and Mexico.

The total cost of the cold weather to Florida tomato producers was approximately $150 million, according to USDA calculations.

The tomato shortage came to an end around late April 2010, as crops had recovered.

== See also ==
- 2010 Indian onion crisis
