= Private Sector Advisory Council =

Agency overview
- Formed: July 13, 2022; 4 years ago
- Jurisdiction: Government of the Philippines
- Agency executive: Sabin M. Aboitiz, Lead Convenor and Lead for Infrastructure Sector

The Private Sector Advisory Council (PSAC) is a Philippine government advisory council that offers guidance to the President of the Philippines in supporting the achievement of the country's economic objectives. Established by President Bongbong Marcos on July 13, 2022, the council primarily aims to assist the government in various key areas. These include the implementation of a comprehensive infrastructure program, fostering job creation, digitizing processes, enhancing agricultural productivity by recalibrating micro, small, and medium enterprises (MSMEs), and fostering equitable, sustainable, and inclusive business environment in the Philippines.

== PSAC lead convenors ==
- Lead Convenor and Lead for Infrastructure Sector: Sabin Aboitiz, president and chief executive officer of Aboitiz Equity Ventures.
- Lead for Agriculture Sector: Aileen Uygongco-Ongkauko, president of La Filipina Uy Gongco Corporation
- Lead for Digital Infrastructure Sector: Myla Villanueva, chair, MDI Group Holdings
- Lead for Tourism Sector: Lance Gokongwei, president and chief executive office of JG Summit Holdings
- Lead for Education and Jobs Sector: Joey Concepcion, founder of Go Negosyo and president and chief executive officer of RFM Corporation.
- Lead for Healthcare Sector: Paolo Borromeo, president and CEO of AC Health, a wholly owned subsidiary of Ayala Corporation.
