= 2010 Indian onion crisis =

The Indian onion crisis of 2010 involved the dramatic rise in the cost of onions across markets in India. The crisis was caused by errant rainfall in the onion producing regions which led to a shortage of onion production. The crisis caused political tension in the country and was described as "a grave concern" by then Prime Minister Manmohan Singh.

== Background ==
Onions are considered an important ingredient of most Indian cooking, providing the pungent foundation for curries and other dishes. Onion prices have been an important political issue: they were regarded as the decisive factor in the 1998 state elections in Delhi and Rajasthan, and were responsible for bringing down the central government in 1980. India is the second largest onion producer in the world, after China.

Forty-five percent of the onions produced in India come from the states of Maharashtra and Karnataka. In November 2010, unseasonal and excessive rainfall in onion-producing regions such as Nashik in Maharashtra delayed the arrival of onions in markets. In December, when fresh crop usually begins to arrive, onion shipments were reduced from 2000 to 3000 tons a day to 700-800 tons a day in New Delhi markets, raising the price of onion from ₹35 (36¢ US) to ₹88 (91¢ US) per kg in the period of one week. The price on some online portals was significantly lower, about 30-40/kg.

== Aftermath ==
Wary of historical precedent, Prime Minister Manmohan Singh and his government responded forcefully by banning onion exports, lowering import taxes and by getting in shipments of onions from neighbouring Pakistan. In late December, following government restrictions on exports, wholesale onion prices went down to ₹50 (52¢ US) per kg in metropolitan markets.

Along with errant rainfall, hoarding, official incompetence and price-ramping by traders have also been blamed for the crisis. The Times of India, in a back-of-the-envelope calculation alleged that wholesale retailers and speculative traders in New Delhi charged a markup of over 135%, taking in profits of over ₹1,000,000 (US$10,000) a day. The opposition Bharatiya Janata Party blamed the crisis on policy decision on exports and imports. Responding to a call from the opposition, 20,000 people demonstrated on the streets of New Delhi to protest the price rise and corruption in the government. The protesters included women and children wearing garlands of onions to symbolize inflation in the prices of basic commodities.

In 2015 the retail prices of onions shot up again to INR 80/kg in Delhi. In Pakistan onions were retailing for PKR 40-50/kg.

== See also ==
- 2010 United States tomato shortage
