= List of government-issued identity documents of the Philippines =

The following is a list of government-issued identity documents of the Philippines.

== List ==
=== National government issued ===
Identity document	Image	Issued by	Issued for	Ref.
Birth certificate		Philippine Statistics Authority	Filipino citizens	
Certificate of No Marriage; CENOMAR		Philippine Statistics Authority	People of single legal status, including those with previous marriages annulled or was rendered void ab initio.	
Driver's License (Including eDL)		Land Transportation Office	Filipino citizens aged 17 and older. Non-Filipino citizens aged 18 and older with permanent residency or who meet other requirements. The eDL is available to all users of the eGovPH app.	
GSIS Digital ID		Government Service Insurance System	All GSIS members. Serves as a digital replacement for the GSIS-issued UMID card and GSIS eCard.	
Marriage certificate		Philippine Statistics Authority	Married Filipino citizens	
MySSS Card		Social Security System	All SSS members with an existing PhilSys ID and a permanent Social Security number. Replaces the old SSS ID and SSS-issued UMID card.	
Philippine Identification System (PhilSys) ID (Including ePhilID and Digital National ID)		Philippine Statistics Authority	Filipino citizens and non-Filipino citizens with permanent residency. The ePhilID is a paper-based version of the PhilSys ID and is considered to be just as valid as the PVC PhilSys ID. The Digital National ID is available to all users of the eGovPH app and is also considered to be as valid as the PVC PhilSys ID.	
NBI clearance		National Bureau of Investigation		
Overseas Employment Certificate		Philippine Overseas Employment Administration	Overseas Filipino Workers	
OWWA E-Card		Overseas Workers Welfare Administration	Overseas Filipino Workers	
PhilHealth ID		Philippine Health Insurance Corporation	PhilHealth members with principal membership status.	
Postal Identity Card		Philippine Postal Corporation (PHLPost)	Filipino citizens and non-Filipino citizens who meet certain requirements.	
Passport		Department of Foreign Affairs	Filipino citizens	
Social Security System (SSS) ID		Social Security System	All SSS members. (Replaced by UMID in 2011. Existing cards remain valid for use.)	
Taxpayer Identification Number (TIN) Card (Including Digital TIN ID)		Bureau of Internal Revenue	Filipino and non-Filipino taxpayers aged 18 and older.	
Unified Multi-Purpose ID; UMID		Social Security System; Government Service Insurance System	Social Security System or Government Service Insurance System members (Discontinued in late 2025. Existing cards remain valid for use. Replaced by MySSS card and GSIS Digital ID, respectively.)	
Voter's Identification Card		Commission on Elections	All registered voters (Issuance suspended in 2017, although proposals have been made in 2024 to start re-printing. Existing cards are still valid.)	
PRC License ID		Professional Regulation Commission	All registered professionals practicing professions regulated by the PRC	

=== Local government issued ===
Identity document	Issued by	Issued for	Ref.
Barangay certificate of residency	Barangay hall	Residents of a barangay	
Community Tax Certificate (CTC); Cedula	Municipal/City government	Residents of a local government unit	
Health / Education, Elderly, Emergency Assistance, Employment / Lifestyle, Livelihood, at Legal Assistance para sa lahat ng Parañaqueños (HELP Citizen Card)	Parañaque City LGU	Registered voters residing in Parañaque at least 18 years old, Parañaque city hall employees, and Ospital ng Parañaque employees	
Person With Disability (PWD) identification card	Social Welfare Development Office	People with disabilities with long-term physical, mental, intellectual and sensory impairments and cancer patients/survivors	
QCitizen	Quezon City LGU	All individuals residing, studying, and working in Quezon City, and non-resident property owners	
Senior citizen card	Office of Senior Citizens Affairs (Can be issued by barangay, municipal/city government)	Individuals of at least 60 years of age	
Right to Care card	Quezon City Gender and Development office	LGBT Quezon City residents with a partner.	

=== Proposed ===
Identity document	Issued by	Issued for	Notes	Ref.
Unified PWD ID	National Council for Disability Affairs and Department of Social Welfare and Development	Persons with Disabilities	Proposed in 2025; Pilot test ongoing; Full rollout expected in the near future.	
