= Overseas Employment Certificate =

Philippine identity document

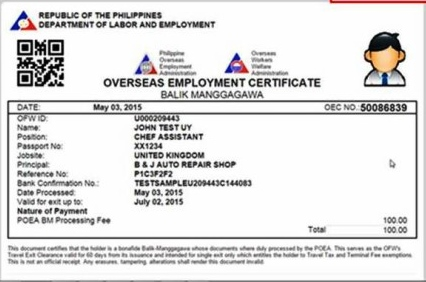
- Issued by: Philippines
- Purpose: Verification of employment
- Eligibility: Filipino citizenship; Valid employment from an employer outside the Philippines; Overseas Workers Welfare Administration (OWWA) membership, PhilHealth premium payment
- Expiration: Varies; same as associated employment contract
- Cost: ₱100
- Rights: Exemptions on travel tax, documentary stamp, and airport fee

An Overseas Employment Certificate (OEC), also known as an exit pass or an exit clearance, is an identity document for Filipino migrant workers or Overseas Filipino Workers (OFWs) departing from the Philippines.

== Background ==
The Overseas Employment Certificate is a mandatory document for all OFWS, both new hires and returning OFWs, also known as Balik Manggagawa (BM). It has been a requirement since the 1980s.

In the Philippine, it can be obtained through the Philippine Overseas Employment Administration and other authorized processing centers. BMs can also acquire OECs from Philippine Overseas Labor Offices (POLOs) in their worksite countries.

OEC's are processed on-site and in itself cost ₱100.

== Reform ==
The process for having to acquire an OEC every time an OFW departs from the Philippines has been criticized for being cumbersome as well as the related financial requirements taking a dent on OFWs' income.

Filipino migrant groups have called for the outright abolition of OECs. It is argued that the working visa issued by the destination country and a valid employment contract should be sufficient. The government has insisted that it needs to verify OFWs' employment on its side.

The OFW ID was launched in 2017 as an intended replacement for the OEC but the implementation was stopped by 2018.

In 2023, President Bongbong Marcos directed the Department of Migrant Workers and other relevant agencies to make OEC processing free-of-charge. The OFW Pass, a digital version of the OEC is being developed.
