= Philippine labor migration policy =

The labor migration policy of the Philippine government allows and encourages emigration. The Department of Foreign Affairs, which is one of the government's arms of emigration, grants Filipinos passports that allow entry to foreign countries. In 1952, the Philippine government formed the Philippine Overseas Employment Administration (POEA) as the agency responsible for opening the benefits of the overseas employment program. In 1995, it enacted the Migrant Workers and Overseas Filipino Act in order to "institute the policies of overseas employment and establish a higher standard of protection and promotion of the welfare of migrant workers and their families and overseas Filipinos in distress." In 2022, the Department of Migrant Workers was formed, incorporating the POEA with its functions and mandate becoming the backbone of the new executive department.

== Profile ==
=== Number of Filipino migrants ===
The Stock Estimate of Overseas Filipinos.
Year	Permanent	Temporary	Irregular	Total
2000	2,551,600	2,991,125	1,840,448	7,383,122
2001	2,736,528	3,049,622	1,625,936	7,412,086
2002	2,807,356	3,167,978	1,607,170	7,582,504
2003	2,865,412	3,385,001	1,515,765	7,766,178
2004	3,187,586	3,559,257	1,297,005	8,043,848
2005	3,931,138	3,654,727	881,123	8,466,988
2006	3,556,035	3,802,345	874,792	8,233,172
2007	3,692,257	4,133,970	900,023	8,726,250
2008	3,907,842	3,626,259	653,609	8,187,710
2009	4,056,940	3,846,068	658,370	8,561,378
2010	4,423,680	4,324,388	704,916	9,452,984
2011	4,867,645	4,513,171	1,074,972	10,455,788
2012	4,925,797	4,221,041	1,342,790	10,489,628
2013	4,869,766	4,207,018	1,161,830	10,238,614

=== Demographics ===
==== Gender ====
Among the Filipino migrants, there is a significant amount of migrants that are Overseas Filipino Workers (OFW). One of the recent trends in Filipino contractual workers is that as years pass by, more and more women have traveled out of the country, outnumbering the men. This can be attributed to the fact that domestic helpers and entertainers are in-demand globally. In fact entertainers destined for Japan and other countries have increased from 3.3% to 18.9% in a span of a decade from 1983 to 1984. As of 2009, the most Filipinos work as household service workers. Out of the total of 71, 557 household workers, 69,669 are women.

Year	OFW (in thousands)	Male	Female
2000	978	527	451
2001	1029	528	501
2002	1056	554	502
2003	982	508	475
2004	1180	604	577
2005	1327	667	660
2006	1515	751	764
2007	1747	890	857
2008	2002	1034	968
2009	1912	1010	901
2010	2043	1068	975
2011	2158	1126	1032
2012	2220	1148	1072
2013	2295	1154	1141
2014	2320	1149	1170

According to the Philippine Statistics Authority (PSA), many of the OFWs are Overseas Contract Workers (OCW).

Year	OCW (in thousands)	Male	Female
2000	922		
2001	964		
2002	990		
2003	933	486	447
2004	1098	560	538
2005	1214		
2006	1384		
2007	1614		
2008	1881		
2009	1890		
2010	1940		
2011	2057	1080	978
2012	2110	1093	1016
2013	2209	1116	1092
2014	2228	1107	1121

==== Age ====
OFWs are distributed among different age groups. The 25-29 age bracket comprises more OFWs than the other age groups.

Year/Age	18-24	25-29	30-34	35-39	40-44	45+
2000	12.1%	23.2%	18.3%	15.2%	12.3%	18.7%
2001	12.3%	22.1%	18.5%	14.3%	13.3%	19.5%
2002	11.6%	23.5%	17.1%	15.1%	13.9%	18.8%
2003	9.7%	21.3%	21.3%	16.9%	13.1%	17.7%
2004	11.5%	23.5%	19.4%	15.7%	13.0%	17.0%
2005	11.8%	23.2%	19.1%	15.8%	13.1%	17.0%
2006	10.7%	24.6%	19.8%	15.0%	12.8%	17.1%
2007	10.0%	24.5%	20.7%	16.3%	11.0%	17.5%
2008	10.0%	25.7%	21.0%	15.1%	11.8%	16.4%
2009	9.8%	24.8%	21.7%	15.5%	12.0%	16.2%
2010	9.0%	25.0%	22.9%	15.2%	11.4%	16.6%
2011	9.3%	23.6%	22.6%	15.9%	11.8%	16.8%
2012	8.2%	24.1%	22.3%	15.9%	12.2%	17.3%
2013	7.8%	23.6%	24.3%	16.0%	11.8%	16.4%
2014	8.2%	24.8%	23.7%	15.8%	11.6%	15.8%

==== Origin ====
OFWs come from all parts of the country, and many of them come from provinces of the Philippines.

Year	NCR
2000	17.6%
2001	19.4%
2002	20.5%
2003	18.5%
2004	17.2%
2005	18.4%
2006	16.4%
2007	16.0%
2008	14.0%
2009	13.9%
2010	13.8%
2011	12.5%
2012	12.6%
2013	12.8%
2014	10.5%

=== Destination ===
Destinations of Filipino migrants
Year	Africa	Asia, East & South	Asia, West	Europe	Americas	Oceania
2000	32,011	1,720,844	1,223,641	802,035	3,137,556	268,711
2001	64,900	1,398,856	1,352,795	739,035	3,301,323	299,908
2002	66,243	1,453,296	1,371,621	803,169	3,334,297	298,609
2003	70,979	1,532,872	1,471,849	767,882	3,381,815	312,963
2004	38,720	1,331,143	1,522,220	548,072	3,221,543	252,437
2005	40,067	1,107,872	1,638,350	577,005	3,110,257	256,249
2006	50,361	1,016,432	1,795,825	616,436	3,256,036	274,435
2007	45,861	1,006,891	2,136,159	674,121	3,330,304	294,374
2008	54,554	1,085,049	2,261,924	693,079	3,518,699	312,792
2009	64,736	1,074,496	2,415,898	722,427	3,582,879	388,520
2010	74,483	1,232,715	2,850,591	663,889	3,883,356	400,800
2011	63,508	1,449,373	2,987,923	808,779	4,326,059	451,042
2012	60,873	1,599,352	2,835,536	768,326	4,396,352	462,324
2013	59,036	1,668,827	2,489,430	866,187	4,313,476	474,492

According to the World Bank, 4,275,200 Filipinos have emigrated out of the country as of 2010. Among those who travel abroad are Overseas Contractual Workers (41%), immigrants (29%) and those who are undocumented (30%). As of 2009, 1,422,586 Filipino workers have contributed to remittances from abroad. According to the book Philippine Labour Migration, these workers can be categorized into eight criteria, by type, countries of deployment, gender, rural or urban origin, civil status, age, education and skills, and occupation.

==== OFW Destinations ====
Although many permanent migrants are residing in the Americas, most OFWs are working in Asian countries. As of 2013, the top destinations for OFWs are Saudi Arabia, United Arab Emirates, Qatar, Kuwait, Hong Kong, and Singapore.

Year	Africa	Asia	Australia	Europe	North & South America
2000	0.8%	77.3%	2.5%	9.3%	8.2%
2001	0.6%	78.1%	2.1%	10.4%	7.5%
2002	1.4%	76.5%	1.7%	11.5%	8.2%
2003	0.8%	76.6%	2.1%	9.4%	9.6%
2004	1.2%	77.1%	2.0%	10.2%	8.9%
2005	1.7%	76.6%	1.9%	9.7%	9.8%
2006	1.7%	78.3%	1.2%	9.5%	9.2%
2007	1.2%	78.1%	1.9%	9.2%	9.3%
2008	1.5%	78.2%	2.4%	9.4%	8.4%
2009	2.0%	79.3%	2.6%	8.3%	7.9%
2010	1.8%	80.0%	2.0%	8.3%	7.9%
2011	1.7%	80.4%	1.7%	8.6%	7.6%
2012	1.7%	79.7%	2.2%	8.7%	7.6%
2013	1.7%	81.2%	2.1%	7.7%	7.3%
2014	1.6%	83.0%	1.7%	7.1%	6.5%

==== Usual occupations ====
Number of Deployed Landbased Overseas Filipino Workers by Major Occupational Category, New Hires

Year	Professional, technical and related workers	Administrative and managerial workers	Clerical workers	Sales workers	Service workers	Agricultural workers	Production workers
2003	78,956	387	3,965	2,490	84,201	413	61,352
2004	94,147	565	5,323	3,950	113,423	632	63,719
2005	63,941	490	5,538	4,261	133,907	350	74,802
2006	41,258	817	7,912	5,517	144,321	807	103,584
2007	43,225	1,139	13,662	7,942	107,135	952	121,715
2008	49,649	1,516	18,101	11,525	123,332	1,354	132,295
2009	47,886	1,290	15,403	8,348	138,222	1,349	117,609
2010	41,835	1,439	10,706	7,242	154,535	1,122	120,647
2011	61,598	4,950	14,115	8,932	201,512	1,757	141,215
2012	54,617	3,241	13,960	9,346	222,260	1,563	146,448
2013	53,840	1,947	12,893	9,220	230,030	2,233	147,776

=== Remittances from overseas Filipino workers (OFWs) ===
A chart on the cash and personal remittances of OFWs in millions of US Dollars

	2011	2012	2013	2014	2015**
Personal remittances	21,922	23,352	25,369	26,968	8,647
Cash remittances	20,117	21,391	22,984	24,348	7,807

* Remittances coursed through a bank

**Partial data only until April 2015

A chart on remittances of OFWs according to regions in millions of US dollars

	2013	2014	2015*
Americas	10,902.8	11,167.9	3,616.3
Middle East	4,348.7	5,334.5	1,677.7
Europe	3,953.1	3,761.1	1,151.8
Asia	3,329.2	3,545.3	1,180.5
Oceania	420.0	510.3	165.4
Africa	30.2	29.1	14.9

*Partial data only until April 2015

== Migration policy ==
=== History ===
The history of Philippine labor migration policies can be traced as far back as 1521, when the Filipino natives started to man ships in the Manila–Acapulco galleon trade. Filipinos started working in the dockyards and aboard ships traveling as far as Mexico, under the mandate of Spanish colonizers. In order to escape maltreatment by the Spaniards, many of those Filipino workers resorted to "jumping ship", settling in state ports like Acapulco, Mexico and Louisiana, USA. They were the first generation of Filipino labor migrants. Since then, three "waves" of labor migration occurred (in the 1900-1940's, the 1940s-1970's, and the 1970s-1990's), each wave taking the Philippines closer to becoming one of the world's largest labor exporting countries, as it is today.

The majority or the bulk of the temporary migration/ contractual/ labor migration started in the mid-1970s with the triggering of the formal adoption of the Overseas Employment Program with the Philippine Labor Code in 1974. It was also in the mid-1970s that the government started to mobilize and promote labor migration in the Middle East as it has opened an opportunity for the Ferdinand Marcos, the then President of the Philippines, to export young unemployed men from the stagnating economy and be able to regulate and encourage labor outflows. The third wave of migration that took place in the 1970s was due to the economic downturn caused by an increase in crude oil prices and job loss in the country. On the other side of the globe, however, oil-exporting countries were making large profits as this created a demand for more laborers to support their new projects. Marcos saw this as a chance to utilize the Philippines’ surplus labor and he created a foreign policy called "Development Diplomacy," which focused on exporting such surplus labor. In 1980, the number of overseas workers set for deployment by the Department of Labor and Employment (DOLE) had increased by 75% from that of the previous year.

=== Factors ===
Labor flows in the Philippines has been determined mainly by three factors: rapid population growth, uneven development and labor oversupply and unemployment.

- Rapid population growth has been a large contributing factor in labor migration. Rapid population growth, which was one of the highest in the world during the 70s-90s, has caused urban growth problems such as overcrowding, traffic congestion, the emergence of squatter areas and slums and ultimately unemployment. This has led migrant workers from the countryside explore outside of the country.
- Uneven population distribution of in the urbanized areas of the country and its other regions has caused socioeconomic imbalance. This socioeconomic imbalance or disparities has been seen to have caused the augmentation of the macroeconomic policies rendering it favourable for the urbanized areas, giving much attention to the industrial sector than the agricultural sector on the other regions of the country. Trade policies have also been seen to be highly biased on the rural development favouring industrial centers like Metro Manila.
- Poor labor absorptive capacity of the country's economy has been a contributing factor for the magnitude of labor migration outside the country. This draws back to the rapid growth of the population outpacing the growth of the country thus causing further unemployment.

=== Government policies ===
Around four centuries after the first Filipino laborers migrated, a law on Philippine labor migration was finally enacted in 1995. The creation of the Migrant Workers and Overseas Filipinos Act of 1995 (RA 8042) was triggered by the growing pressures on the Philippines imposed by the murder case of Flor Contemplacion. This case almost severed bilateral ties between the Philippines and Singapore (Contemplacion's host country), negatively affecting the former's economy with a $61.3B decrease in investments by the latter. Graver than the economic distress caused by the Contemplacion case, was the reality it symbolized for the Filipinos. It was the final blow in a long struggle against the abuse suffered by Filipino migrant workers in their host countries. Besides that, other problems also existed, such as the abundance of so-called "tourist workers"—workers who migrated without going through the due process of labor migration and the proper briefing provided by regulatory government agencies. Faced with such problems, RA 8042 was created with its goal: "to institute the policies of overseas employment and establish a higher standard of protection and promotion of the welfare of migrant workers and their families and overseas Filipinos in distress."

RA 8042 or the Migrant Workers and Overseas Filipinos Act of 1995 seeks to deliver and provide full protection and promote full and equal employment opportunities for migrant workers. According to the Philippine Overseas Employment Administration, the act is intended for the assurance of the dignity and fundamental human rights and freedom of the Filipino citizens with an imperative to have an access to court and quasi-judicial bodies for the distressed overseas Filipinos. RA 8042 provided mechanisms to protect Filipino labor migrants from issues such as illegal recruitment and abuse by their employers. Some of the services that the government was to provide as stipulated in the law (Articles II-V) were the following:

- To prevent illegal recruitment: issuance of travel advisories & information dissemination on labor and employment conditions and migration to be published thrice a quarter in a general circulation newspaper; creation of the Migrant Workers Loan Guarantee Fund of P100M for pre-departure and family loans of migrant workers
- To aid migrant workers in distress in their host countries: creation of Emergency Repatriation Fund of at least P100M for repatriation of migrant workers in times of war, epidemic, disasters (natural or manmade), etc.
- To enforce migrant workers’ rights in their host countries: establishment of Migrant Workers and Other Overseas Filipinos Resource Center which will provide, among many others, counsel and legal services, welfare assistance (medical services), post-arrival orientation, settlement and community networking services, human resource development (skills training), monitoring of daily situations of migrant workers, etc.; Rights and Enforcement Mechanisms Under International Human Rights Systems by the DFA (which will see to it that Filipino migrant workers who are victims of abuse and violation will receive the treatment they deserve under international human rights systems)
- For returning Filipino migrant workers: establishment of re-placement and monitoring center which will aid their reintegration into the Philippine society by developing livelihood programs and promoting their local employment, among other services
- Legal Services: creation of Legal Assistance Fund of P100M that will be used exclusively to provide legal services to Filipino migrant workers and overseas Filipinos in distress

In 2001, the Arroyo administration took a new stand regarding migrant workers. While RA 8042 stipulates that "the State does not promote overseas employment as a means to sustain economic growth and achieve national development… [rather], the existence of the overseas employment program rests solely on the assurance that the dignity and fundamental rights and freedoms of the Filipino citizen shall not, at any time be compromised or violated," President Arroyo declared overseas employment as a "legitimate option for the country’s work force. As such, government shall fully respect labor mobility, including the preference for overseas employment." Such statement signaled the shift of the government's role from merely managing migrant workers in their ventures abroad to actively promoting "international labor migration as a growth strategy, especially of the higher skilled, knowledge-based workers."

In 2001–04, the following employment-promoting strategies were implemented: enhancing the skills and competencies of the Philippine labor market by giving them easier access to training programs, facilitating employment by providing updated information on job opportunities to ensure the matching of workers’ skills and jobs, etc.

In 2010, RA 10022 or an Act Amending RA 8042 was enacted. The amendments to the law sought to further improve the protection mechanisms provided for Filipino migrant workers. RA 10022 is an act that amends RA 8024 that further improves the standard of protection and promotion of the welfare of migrant workers, their families and the overseas Filipinos in distress. This amendment establishes a continuous monitoring of international conventions, ratify those that guarantee protection of the migrant workers and enter bilateral agreement with the countries hosting overseas Filipino workers, free and accessible skills development and enhancement program for the unskilled workers. The state will also recognize non-government organizations, trade union, workers association, stakeholders and their similar entities duly recognized as legitimate in the protection of the Filipino overseas workers.

From 1565 to 2010, the face of Philippine Labor Migration had continued to evolve. Today, this stronger, systematized policy that the country adopts is one that neighboring countries like for example Indonesia try to emulate.

=== Regulatory impact analysis ===
According to Aniceto C. Orbeta Jr. and Michael R.M. Abrigo, on their research Managing International Labor Migration: The Philippine Experience, however the Philippines is seen as the global model in managing international labor migration, the Philippine Migration Management Infrastructure has inefficiencies that needed to be restructured or highlighted. This includes the inefficiency of the migration policies to resolve illegal recruitment cases, professionalization of the Household Service Worker Sector or the HSW has been unknown to migrant workers, minimum wage provision has been violated by the stipulation of a lower minimum wage, and issues regarding the no-placement fee provision. Cost of deployment for workers has been greatly affected by the inclusion of Language and Culture and Stress Management trainings.

== Current situation ==
=== Labor export policy under the Philippine Development Plan 2011-2016 ===
The Labor Export Policy (LEP) of the Philippines aims to protect and support its migrant workers. For a country who chooses to solve its unemployment by making work abroad more convenient for Filipinos, the Philippines has made several processes in order to protect and support its citizens.

To be able to work abroad, Filipinos must go through a licensed recruiter or a government agency or have their contracts approved by the Philippine Overseas Employment Administration (POEA).

In order to protect its migrants, the Philippines has made private recruiters pass through certain government standards. In order to be a licensed recruitment agency, it must be Filiipino-owned, meet capitalization and bonding requirement as well as not charging the worker more than one month's salary as a placement fee.

To be able to provide quality labor to other countries and support to Filipinos, the Philippine government provides a number of subsidized benefits such as pre-migration training on social and work conditions abroad, life insurance and pension plans, medical insurance and tuition assistance for the migrant and his or her family, and eligibility for pre-departure and emergency loans. Registration for these benefits, which are administered by the Overseas Workers Welfare Administration (OWWA) is compulsory. This is paid for by the agency from the direct wages of the migrant or directly from the migrant himself/herself.

In the case of the Philippine Development Plan (PDP) 2011–2016, Overseas Filipino Workers (OFWs) are to be required to apply for all social security schemes of the government Asset Reform. e.g. SSS, PhilHealth.

=== Procedures and qualifications for workers ===
For those who are going through certain agencies for employment abroad, the following are the documents for submission to the Philippine Overseas Employment Administration (POEA).

==== Land-based ====
1. Duly accomplished OFW Information Sheet
2. Your Verified Employment Contract
3. PDOS Certificate, National Certificate (NC) II, Comprehensive Pre-Departure Education Program (CPDEP) Certificate from OWWA (For HSWs)
4. Verified Insurance Policy

==== Sea-based ====
1. Seafarer's Information Sheet
2. Employment Contract (original and duplicate)
3. Seafarer's Registration Certificate (SRC) (original)
4. Seafarer's Identification and Record Book (SIRB) (original)

==== Fees ====
Recruitment agencies will charge service fees from the employer as payment for services rendered in recruiting the worker. The employer also pays the cost of:

- PHP200.00 - POEA Processing Fee
- US$25.00 (PHP equivalent) - OWWA (Overseas Workers Welfare Administration) Membership Contribution (valid for two years)
- PHP900.00 - PhilHealth-Medicare (for one year coverage)

The agency is allowed to collect from the worker a placement fee equivalent to one month salary, except in countries prohibiting collection of fees from workers. However, there are agencies that illegally collect even more than this, without receipts.

=== Salary, taxes and benefits ===
According to Hans Cacdac, POEA Head, OFWs are required to be given salary of a minimum of $400 a month. OFWs are also exempted from having their income taxed by the Philippines.

In agreement with the rules of POEA, OFWs are entitled to the following benefits:

- eight hours' rest per day
- one day off a week
- free transportation from the Philippines to the host country and back
- free accommodations and food
- free medical and dental services
- vacation leave with pay of up to 15 days a year
- Personal life accident, medical and repatriation insurance from a reputable insurance company
- Remittance of money to the Philippines, and assistance from the employer in setting up a bank account for this
- just and humane treatment from the employer

== Risks ==
=== Health ===
With OFWs travelling back and forth between countries, it cannot be avoided that disease will be spread from one nation to another. The risk involved here is that communities and people who have never been exposed to a certain disease will not have the necessary antibodies to fight the sickness.

==== HIV/AIDS ====
One of the common health hazards with working abroad is HIV/AIDS. The spread of the disease was due to the limited condom use, multiple partnering, clients of sex workers, low HIV knowledge, and low perceived HIV risk. It was expected by the Trade Union Congress of the Philippines (TUCP) on June 22, 2015, that the number of OFWs testing positive to HIV could breach 4,000 if the government fails to take action. As of April 2015, the number of OFWs infected already reached 3,509 with the 221 new cases from January to April 2015. The median age of infected OFWs is 33 and mostly male. They comprise 14 percent of the aggregate 24,936 cases in the Philippine HIV and AIDS Registry as of April 2015.

==== Ebola and Middle East respiratory syndrome ====
During the Ebola outbreak, nations were devastatingly affected with the highly contagious virus. President Benigno Aquino III held off from announcing whether or not the country will send a team of health workers to West Africa. As the disease is spread via direct contact with an infected person, even after a short period after death, the risk of infection is very high and direct contact to any individual should be avoided to prevent the further spread of the virus. During this time, the MERS-related coronavirus, another highly contagious virus, has already been put on the watch-list. Precautions were made to prevent the spread of the virus through education, close monitoring, and working with global authorities to deal with the diseases.

=== Abuse ===
The issue commonly seen in social networks is that of physical abuse under foreign employment. These abuse cases can be caused by their own employers or by their co-workers. The intensity of each case can range from physical abuse to rape or even murder.

==== Cases ====
Jasmin Vergara suffered from sexual and physical abuse from her employers in Saudi in September 2012. She was asked to do sexual favors and was beaten upon refusal. When she received gifts or owned something that was not allowed by the employers, she was beaten. The sons of her employers would molest and sexually harass her. She was only kept silent by her responsibility to her family.

Another OFW, who remains anonymous, was abused by a female employer in Kuwait before she escaped. She suffered being poured hot water on her back so that she would wake up and also suffered having her head hit the wall several times. Kuwait court ordered her employer to pay P2 million in damages to the OFW.

==== Movements ====
Senate President Pro Tempore Ralph Recto suggested to increase the number of trained government personnel who can give comfort and aid to OFWs. This can be done, according to Recto "[By adding] a fourth leg to the traditional agencies assisting the OFWs and that would be the Department of Social Welfare and Development which can dispatch professional social workers to countries where there are Filipinos in distress who need to be aided." He also stated that there are budget limitation in and one possible funding source are "reasonable adjustments" in operating cost and overhead costs of DSWD's Conditional Cash Transfer program in 2014.

=== Illegal recruitment ===
The POEA apprehends numerous illegal recruiters regularly. Some of these recruiters submitted fake documents, which can be defined as the presenting false information. The cancellation of their license is then imposed with a corresponding penalty.

There are certain penalties associated with illegal recruitment:

1. Any person found guilty of illegal recruitment shall suffer the penalty of imprisonment of not less than six (6) years and one (1) day but not more than twelve (12) years and a fine not less than two ₱200,000.00 nor more than ₱500,000.00.
2. The penalty of life imprisonment and a fine of not less than ₱500,000.00) nor more than ₱1,000,000.00 shall be imposed if illegal recruitment constitutes economic sabotage as defined herein.

Provided, however, that the maximum penalty shall be imposed if the person illegally recruited is less than eighteen (18) years of age or committed by a non-licensee or non-holder of authority.

Many illegal recruitment agencies form for the sake of profit and some examples of how they earn money is by stealing the applicant's money or by using the applicant in human trafficking or as drug mules for drug trafficking.

POEA has partnered with an online recruitment company, Jobstreet.com, to fight illegal recruitment. In 2012, 152 cases of illegal recruitment with 312 victims were filed.

=== Overseas Filipino Workers incarcerated or executed abroad ===
The current administration led by Pres. Benigno Aquino III has been the subject of scrutiny for international labor issues. According to Migrante International, a militant group supporting overseas workers, the current administration holds the record of having the most number of OFW executions since the implementation of the Philippine labor export policy in 1974.

==== Latest cases ====
In April 2015, the nation witnessed Mary Jane Veloso's clamor for clemency from the government of Indonesia, in order to reverse her death sentence due to her drug trafficking case. Inasmuch as President Aquino appealed to Joko Widodo, president of Indonesia, the administration was bashed by a considerable majority especially on social media arguing that its efforts are always "last minute." Not to be ignored is Veloso's mother's statement, "taumbayan ang tumulong."

In December 2014, Carlito Lana, an OFW in Saudi Arabia, was sentenced to death due to his murder case. Being forced to pray during Muslim prayer time, Lana killed his employer in 2010 and was convicted in the same year. In 2014, his death was ordered by the Saudi Arabian government. Lana was the sixth OFW executed under the present administration.

As of April 2015, there is a total of 88 Filipinos in the death row in various countries according to the Department of Foreign Affairs.

Regarding the Legal Assistance Fund for OFWs, Budget Secretary Florencio Abad stated that the DFA has an allocation of Php100 million in the 2015 national budget in response to militant groups’ accusations of insufficient funding for the sector supposed to extend support to overseas workers facing criminal charges in other countries.

These two cases are just a microcosm of the difficulties that Overseas Filipino Workers encounter in the event that they get caught in the intricacies of foreign law and regulations. Not to be forgotten is the case of Flor Contemplacion, sentenced to death in 1995 in Singapore, which paved the way to the review of the international labor laws of the Philippines.

The Aquino and Arroyo administrations each have six OFW executions in the tally of Migrante International. The high number of those remaining in the death row under the present administration poses an alarming state for the OFW community in various parts of the world.

== Cost-benefit analysis ==
=== Economic benefits ===
==== Employment ====
The volume of OFWs working abroad as a proportion of the labor force of the country has increased dramatically. In 2014, the number of Filipinos working abroad grew by 137 percent from its number in the year 2000.

According to the results of the 2014 Survey on Overseas Filipinos, the total number of OFWs currently stands at 2.3 million, based on the total number of OFWs working abroad anytime from April to September 2014.

During the 1990s the National Economic and Development Authority (NEDA) calculated that the country needed to create at least one million jobs annually in order to reach full employment by the year 2000. However, in 1994 only 415,000 jobs became available while the country's labor force increased by around 700,000.

It was observed by the International Labour Organization (ILO) that the country's full employment goal couldn't be met with the domestic labor conditions and only through sending contract workers overseas could the country provide jobs for its people. Therefore, unemployment alleviation is one benefit from labor migration.

==== Remittances ====
For countries like the Philippines, remittances are the main benefit of labor migration. With higher wages abroad, money can be sent back to the workers' families in the Philippines and this money is either consumed or saved. Therefore, remittances from abroad increase consumption in the source country and create more demand for goods. Either through formal banking channels (where the government is able to measure foreign exchange) or through informal channels, the money circulates within the source country and helps stimulate the economy.

Furthermore, families who receive remittances tend to have a higher financial status. A slight decrease in poverty levels has been observed as a result. On the other hand, there is no clear negative relationship between income inequality and remittances in the Philippines.

However, as Guinigundo argues, it is imperative to note that “for every 1 unit increase in the ratio OF (Overseas Filipino) remittances to GDP, the Gini coefficient increases by 3.3 units” (p. 266). Thus, they claim “if GDP growth is accompanied by an increase in inequality, this could still worsen poverty” (p. 266).

Building on these arguments a study conducted by Reyes and Tabuga (2011) reveals that the redistribution of income is another consideration to made to aid the relationship between the rate of growth and poverty reduction. Ultimately—while globalization has no direct link to affecting poverty—in coming to state concerns such as economic growth and income inequality, one must consider of the means of economic growth.

The following table shows the cash remittances of OFWs per year for the last five years.

Ye	2010	2011	2012	2013	2014
Remittances (in million USD)	18,763	20,117	21,391	22,984	24,348

Total OFW remittances have been increasing for the past years. In 1990, the yearly remittances reached the one billion US dollar mark and 24 years later, in 2014, had increased to 24 billion US dollars. Overseas workers' cash remittances in 2014 rose by 5.8 percent from its 2013 level. Cash and non-cash remittances combined, there has been a 6.2 percent increase in 2014 from its number in the preceding year.

Remittances have helped stabilize the government's national accounts. From 1975 to 1994, these remittances accounted for 2.6% of the country's gross national product (GNP). However, according to the 2011 figures, remittances rose to around 11.17% of the country's GNP. NEDA economists believe that without these earnings from abroad, economic growth would be much lower. The country's GNP grew because of high rates of OFW remittances and the government believed that the money remitted was used to help start-up small businesses, boost consumer spending and enable small-scale construction.

In 2014, remittances from OFWs constituted ten percent of the Philippines’ Gross Domestic Product (GDP).

==== Foreign Exchange Reserves and Debt Repayment ====
As of 2012 the country has huge debts, but the overseas Filipino workers (OFWs) foreign exchange remittances have kept the country's debts from increasing to critical levels. Not only is foreign debt being paid with these remittances but they are also used as collateral for new loans. Furthermore, they help to improve the balance of payments and reduce the trade gap. Foreign exchange reserves mainly come from labor migration and OFW remittances have surpassed the export sector in producing foreign exchange. For this reason the government is supporting overseas deployment of the labor force which has reached around one million Filipinos per year.

=== Negative effects and social costs ===
==== Decrease in domestic labor force ====
Although the labor force of the country has been increasing, labor migration has caused a lack of skilled workers, especially specialist workers who choose to work abroad for higher wages. As well as the social issues caused by OFWs and those they leave behind, the decrease in specialists has forced companies and government agencies to hire less experienced workers for highly skilled jobs.

With what is colloquially called "brain drain," the Philippines loses its human capital with the continuously growing number of Filipinos who decide to work abroad mostly for better compensation. This "exodus" of workers, such as nurses and doctors, will eventually lead to the country having a shortage of skilled workers in various sectors.

Overseas Filipino Workers also decide to work abroad during their prime years, i.e. 25–34 years old. This age bracket constitutes 48.5 percent of the total OFW population in 2014. On the side of the Philippines, this diaspora of Filipinos is a loss to the country due to the productivity that they could have contributed had they been working in the domestic sectors rather than abroad.

==== Economic dependence ====
With the growing number of OFWs sent abroad, the national economy, bolstered by remittances from other countries, becomes conditioned by the very fact that the growth exhibited by the economy is due mainly to monetary remittances by OFWs and not really contributed by national growth per se.

The economic consequences of being import-dependent and export-oriented redound to the disadvantage of the Philippines as it furthers mechanisms of dependence on other countries. In addition, the Labor Export Policy conceals the national economy's innate weakness through the remittances of OFWs to their families, with the local manufacturing industry performing poorly but nonetheless compensated for by the said source of income.

==== Broken families ====
One of the consequences of working abroad is separation from one's family. Reports from the POEA, Overseas Workers Welfare Administration (OWWA) and Non-Government Organizations, as presented by Senator Miriam Defensor-Santiago in 2007 for Senate Bill 1779, all point to the negative effects of separation due to labor migration in the OFWs’ families, most especially their children. Such effects include "broken marriages, drug addiction, sexual immorality, crimes, suicidal attempts and psychological breakdowns."

== See also ==
- Brain drain in the Philippines
- Commission on Filipinos Overseas
- Overseas Workers Welfare Administration
- Philippine Overseas Employment Administration
