= Hans Cacdac =

Filipino government official

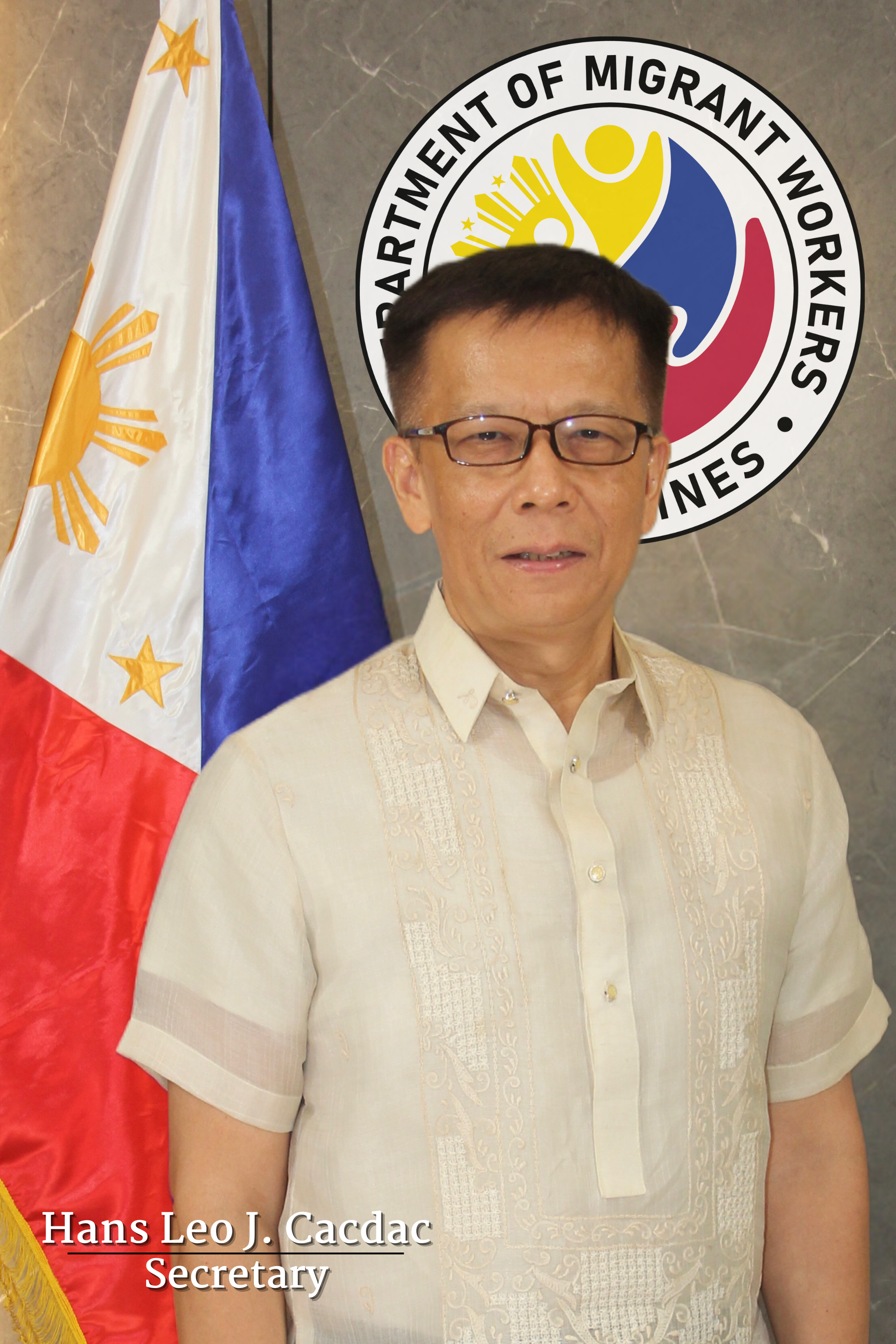

2nd Secretary of Migrant Workers
- Incumbent
- Assumed office September 7, 2023 (Note: DMW undersecretary Cacdac was first assigned Officer in Charge of the department from September 7, 2023 to April 25, 2024, after the death of Sec. Ople and has assumed the position of secretary of the Department of Migrant Workers on April 26, 2024.)
- President: Bongbong Marcos
- Preceded by: Susan Ople

Administrator of Overseas Workers Welfare Administration
- In office October 3, 2016 – August 10, 2022
- President: Rodrigo Duterte; Bongbong Marcos
- Preceded by: Rebecca Calzado
- Succeeded by: Arnell Ignacio

Administrator of Philippine Overseas Employment Administration
- In office January 2, 2012 – October 3, 2016
- President: Benigno Aquino III; Rodrigo Duterte
- Preceded by: Carlos Cao Jr.
- Succeeded by: Claro Arellano

Undersecretary for the Department of Labor and Employment
- In office 2010 – January 2, 2012
- President: Benigno Aquino III

Personal details
- Born: Hans Leo Javier Cacdac; March 13, 1968 (age 58) Manila, Philippines
- Spouse: Ruby Alvarez
- Children: 1
- Education: Ateneo de Manila University (AB, JD); Samford University (LLM)
- Occupation: Government official, migrant workers' rights advocate, labor lawyer

Hans Leo Javier Cacdac (born March 13, 1968) is a Filipino government official, migrant workers' advocate, and labor lawyer. He currently serves as the secretary of migrant workers in the Philippines, having been appointed by President Bongbong Marcos in April 2024.

== Early life and education ==
Hans Leo Javier Cacdac was born in Manila to Ilocano and Negrense parents. His father, Napoleon Cacdac, a World War II veteran, began his journey as an overseas Filipino worker (OFW) with the US state-run news network Voice of America (VOA), an experience that would later influence Hans's career in migrant workers' affairs.

Cacdac completed his undergraduate studies at Ateneo de Manila University, earning a Bachelor of Arts degree in philosophy in 1989. He then pursued his legal education at Ateneo Law School, where he obtained his Juris Doctor in 1993. After passing the Philippine Bar Examination in 1994, he furthered his studies abroad, completing his Master of Laws in Comparative Law and Labor Law from Cumberland School of Law, Samford University in Alabama, United States, in 1998.

== Career ==
=== Legal career and early public service ===
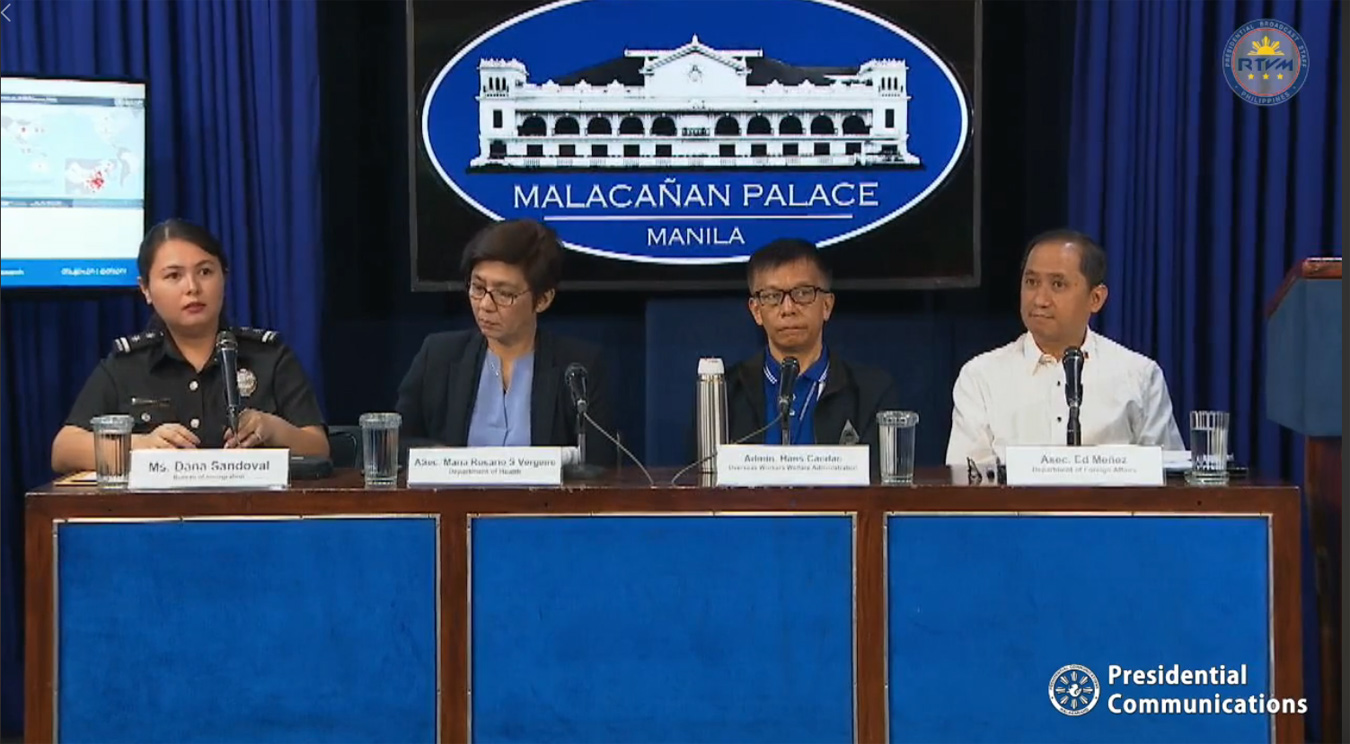
Cacdac (2nd from right) during the Laging Handa Press Briefing at the Malacañan Palace in 2020

After passing the bar, Cacdac began his career as an associate lawyer and served as the Urban Poor Unit Coordinator at the Sentro ng Alternatibong Lingap Panligal (SALIGAN) until 2001.

Cacdac built an extensive career in Philippine public service, particularly in labor relations and overseas employment. He started his government service as director of the Bureau of Labor Relations under the Department of Labor and Employment (DOLE). He later served as administrator of the National Conciliation and Mediation Board, handling labor disputes and mediation efforts.

In 2010, President Benigno Aquino III appointed Cacdac as DOLE's Undersecretary for Labor Relations, where he worked on labor policy and administration. He returned to the Philippine Overseas Employment Administration (POEA) in January 2012 as its administrator, a position he held for four years. During his time at POEA, he focused on regulating recruitment agencies, suspending licenses, and blacklisting agencies involved in trafficking, excessive placement fees, and deceptive practices.

Cacdac's expertise in overseas employment grew as he served as administrator of the POEA. During his tenure, the POEA suspended licenses of overseas recruiters who violated POEA requirements, blacklisting agencies involved in trafficking, charging excessive placement fees, and deceiving domestic workers. This was followed by his assignment as the administrator of Overseas Workers Welfare Administration (OWWA) in 2016.

=== Department of Migrant Workers ===
In 2022, Cacdac was appointed as the undersecretary for welfare and foreign employment at the Department of Migrant Workers (DMW) under Secretary Susan Ople. Following the death of Secretary Ople, Cacdac served was appointed on September 7, 2023, as the Officer in Charge of the DMW and as secretary on April 25, 2024. Due to an adjournment by the Commission on Appointments, he was reappointed as interim DMW Secretary to maintain operational continuity.

==== Leadership as DMW secretary ====
As secretary of the Department of Migrant Workers, Cacdac has prioritized the protection and welfare of Overseas Filipino Workers (OFWs). During the 2024 Israel–Hamas conflict, he played a crucial role in coordinating the repatriation of Filipino workers from Israel, stating, "We stand continually ready to assist and support our kababayans who wish to go home for safety and security."

== Personal life ==
Cacdac is married to Ruby Alvarez from Davao City. They have a daughter, Lourdes Severine.

== Notes ==
Political offices
Preceded by Susan Ople	Secretary of Migrant Workers; 2024–present	Incumbent
Order of precedence
Preceded by Maria Cristina Aldeguer-Roque as Secretary of Trade and Industry	Order of Precedence of the Philippines as Secretary of Migrant Workers	Succeeded by Jose Acuzar as Secretary of Human Settlements and Urban Development
