= Susan Ople =

Filipino politician and advocate (1962–2023)

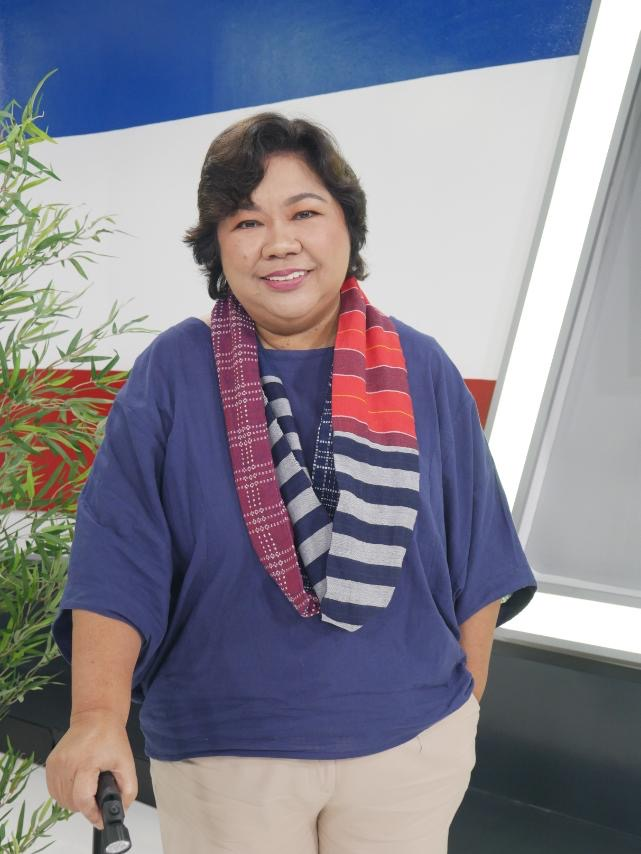
- Ople in 2022

1st Secretary of Migrant Workers
- In office June 30, 2022 – August 22, 2023
- President: Bongbong Marcos
- Preceded by: Abdullah Mama-o (Ad interim)
- Succeeded by: Hans Leo Cacdac

Undersecretary for the Department of Labor and Employment
- In office 2004–2009
- President: Gloria Macapagal Arroyo

Personal details
- Born: Maria Susana Vasquez Ople; February 9, 1962
- Died: August 22, 2023 (aged 61) Metro Manila, Philippines
- Resting place: Garden Of The Divine Word, Christ the King Mission Seminary, Quezon City
- Party: Nacionalista
- Domestic partner: Fort Jose
- Children: 1
- Education: University of Santo Tomas (BA); Harvard University (MPA)

Maria Susana "Toots" Vasquez Ople (February 9, 1962 – August 22, 2023) was a Filipina politician and Overseas Filipino Workers' (OFW) rights advocate who served as the first Secretary of the Department of Migrant Workers.

== Biography ==
Susan Ople was born on February 9, 1962, the youngest of the seven children of Blas F. Ople and Susana Vasquez. Her father served as Labor Secretary/Minister during the Marcos regime and later as Senator. She served as media relations officer of Senator Ernesto Herrera and then of her father. She later became chief of staff to her father in the Senate and later at the Department of Foreign Affairs when he became its Secretary. Alongside Herrera, she was the co-founder the Citizens’ Drugwatch Foundation.

In 2004, Ople was appointed Undersecretary of the Department of Labor and Employment by President Gloria Macapagal Arroyo. She then ran for Senator in the 2010 Philippine elections but lost, ranking 34th out of 61 candidates.

Ople was the founder and president of the Blas Ople Policy Center (BOPC) which assists distressed overseas Filipino workers (OFWS) in various parts of the world. To promote her advocacy, Ople co-anchored the popular daily radio show “Bantay OFW” at DZXL. She also had a Saturday radio program on DWIZ 882 AM called “Global Pinoy”.

Ople ran again for Senator under the Nacionalista Party in the 2016 Philippine Elections. She advocated to pass laws that would help advance the welfare of OFWs while at the same time highlighting key issues that affect them today. She was endorsed by four of five presidential candidates, namely Miriam Defensor-Santiago, Jejomar Binay, Grace Poe (of which Ople was part of a senatorial slate), and Rodrigo Duterte. She lost, placing 22nd out of 50 candidates.

In 2022, President Bongbong Marcos appointed Ople as secretary of the newly created Department of Migrant Workers. On November 29, 2022, her appointment was confirmed by the congressional Commission on Appointments, making her the first secretary of the newly created executive department.

== Final years and legacy ==
Ople was diagnosed with breast cancer, which caused her to delay considering her appointment to Marcos' cabinet. Following Marcos' second State of the Nation Address in July 2023, she took medical leave. On August 22, 2023, she died from complications of the disease. She died while confined at the St. Luke's Medical Center in Metro Manila. She was 61 years old.

In 2024, President Marcos, as tribute to Ople, led the groundbreaking of the OFW Hospital's Bagong Pilipinas Cancer Care Center, which is the country's third such facility. In 2025, she was posthumously awarded the Order of Lakandula by Marcos.

== Advocacies ==
Ople's main line of advocacy was on the rights of Overseas Filipino Workers, especially those being maltreated. She opposed the death sentence given by Indonesia to Mary Jane Veloso, who was tricked to carry drugs into the country, and advocated for the release of numerous OFWs imprisoned in the Middle East. In the labor sector, she supported the abolition of contractualization and called better employment opportunities, especially among the youth sector.

Ople supported the passage of the SOGIE Equality Bill which penalizes discrimination based on sexual orientation and gender identity, and wrote articles in favor of the LGBT community.

Ople supported the abolition of political dynasties as enshrined in the Philippine Constitution.

Political offices
Preceded by Abdullah Mama-o; Ad interim	Secretary of Migrant Workers; 2022–2023	Succeeded by Hans Leo Cacdac
