= Unemployment benefits in the Philippines =

Unemployment benefits in the Philippines are payments made by the government to unemployed people. The unemployment benefits provided by the Philippine government is sourced either from the country's Social Security System (SSS) or the Government Service Insurance System (GSIS).

== Private sector ==
The Social Security Act of 2018 mandates the government to provide unemployment benefits to private sector employees who were involuntarily separated from employment. Unemployment benefit is also referred to as unemployment insurance or involuntary separation benefit. The payments are sourced from the country's Social Security System (SSS). The benefits are not dispensed as a loan and thus does not incur additional fees to the claimant.

Until 2018, there was no unemployment benefit scheme for private employees. The Social Security Act of 1954 has provisions related to unemployment benefits but the provisions were included without prior study on the solvency of the then to be established social security system. The provisions on unemployment benefits were dropped when the legislation was amended in 1957 to prioritize retirement, sickness, disability and death benefits.

Under the 2018 legislation, the benefits are dispensed through a one-time payment to equal to 50 percent of the claimant's monthly salary for a maximum of two months. It must also be filed a year from the date of separation.

=== Qualifications ===
The unemployment benefit of the SSS also covers the kasambahay (housemaids) as well as Overseas Filipino Workers (OFWs; Filipino migrant workers). Claimants should have made 36 monthly contributions to the SSS, 12 months of which should be in the 18-month period immediately preceding the month of involuntary separation.

Employees who were involuntarily separated from employment for the following reasons are ineligible to avail for unemployment benefit:

- Willful disobedience to lawful orders
- Gross and habitual neglect of duties
- Fraud or willful breach of trust/loss of confidence
- Commission of a crime or offense
- Analogous cases like abandonment, gross inefficiency, disloyalty / conflict of interest / dishonesty.

The claimant must also be no above 60 years old at the time of separation; not above 50 years if they are underground or surface mineworker; not above 55 years old if they are a racehorse jockey.

== Public sector ==
Unemployment benefits of former government employees are sourced from the Government Service Insurance System (GSIS). Payments are equal to 50 percent of the claimant's average monthly compensation and are dispensed monthly for two to six months, depending on the claimant's length of service. Eligible workers are those who have made the compulsory 12 months integrated contributions to the GSIS under Republic Act No. 8291 and were involuntarily separated from their employment.

Contributions made	Benefit duration
1 year – below 3 years	2 months
6 years – below 9 years	4 months
9 years – below 11 years	5 months
11 years – below 15 years	6 months
