= Abdullah Mama-o =

Filipino government official

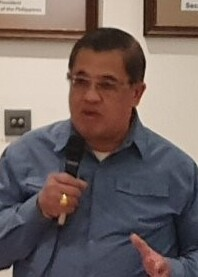
- Mama-o in 2020

Secretary of Migrant Workers
- Ad interim
- In office March 9, 2022 – June 30, 2022
- President: Rodrigo Duterte
- Preceded by: Office established
- Succeeded by: Susan Ople

Abdullah Derupong Mama-o is a Filipino government official who served as the ad interim Secretary of the Department of Migrant Workers under the Duterte administration.

== Education ==
Mama-o attended the San Beda College and graduated from the school in 1972.

== Career ==
President Rodrigo Duterte appointed Mama-o as the presidential adviser on Overseas Filipino Workers first tasking him of overseeing the repatriation of Filipinos in Saudi Arabia who were affected by a financial crisis.

He would be appointed as special envoy to Kuwait amidst the 2018 Kuwait–Philippines diplomatic crisis.

In 2018, Duterte formed a task force, which Mama-o was made a member of, as part of a bid to free Filipinos who were kidnapped by armed militants in Libya. In 2019, Mama-o helped facilitate the return of seven Filipinos in Libya who were accused of smuggling fuel.

President Duterte would appoint Mama-o as the first secretary of the Department of Migrant Workers (DMW) in March 9, 2022. However the department is in a transition period and is expected to be fully operational by 2023.

Political offices
New office	Secretary of Migrant Workers; Ad interim 2022	Succeeded by Susan Ople
