= Overseas Workers Welfare Administration =

Agency of Philippines department

- Pangasiwaan sa Kagalingan ng Manggagawa sa Ibayong-dagat (Filipino)

Agency overview
- Formed: May 1, 1977
- Headquarters: OWWA Center Bldg, F.B. Harrison cor. 7th Street, Pasay, Metro Manila, Philippines
- Employees: 401 (2024)
- Annual budget: ₱7.6 billion (2021)
- Agency executive: Atty. Patricia Yvonne Caunan, Administrator
- Parent agency: Department of Migrant Workers
- Website: owwa.gov.ph

The Overseas Workers Welfare Administration (OWWA; Filipino: Pangasiwaan sa Kagalingan ng Manggagawa sa Ibayong-dagat) is a national government agency vested with special function of developing and implementing welfare programs and services to the needs of its members OFW and their families.

OWWA is an attached agency of the Department of Migrant Workers of the Philippines. It protects the interests of Overseas Filipino Workers and their families, providing social security, cultural services and help with employment, remittances and legal matters. It is funded by an obligatory annual contribution from overseas workers and their employers.

== History ==
The agency was founded as the Welfare and Training Fund for Overseas Workers through Letter of Instruction No. 537, signed by President Ferdinand Marcos on May 1, 1977. It was renamed into Overseas Workers Welfare Administration (OWWA) through Executive Order No. 126, signed by President Corazon Aquino on January 30, 1987. Republic Act No. 10801 signed by President Benigno Aquino III on May 10, 2016, further defined the powers of the agency.

== Programs and services ==
The Overseas Workers Welfare Administration (OWWA) offers welfare programs and services to Overseas Foreign Workers (OFW) members and their families. This services include education and training, reintegration, pre-education departure program, repatriation and social benefits.

=== Education and Training ===
- Baccalaureate courses
  - Education for Development Scholarship Program
  - OFW - Dependent Scholarship Program
  - Congressional Migrant Workers Scholarship Program
- Short-term courses
  - Skills for Scholarship Program
  - Seafarers Upgrading Program
  - Information Technology Training Program
  - Updating Management Level Courses

=== Reintegration ===
- OFW Enterprise and Loan Development Program
  - Enterprise Development Intervention
  - Loan Facility
- Balik Pilipinas, Balik Hanap-buhay Program

=== Pre-departure Education Program ===
- Pre-departure Orientation Seminar
- Comprehensive Pre-departure Education Program for Household Service Workers

=== Repatriation ===
- Repatriation Program

=== Social Benefits ===
- Education and Livelihood Assistance Program
- Death and Disability Benefit
  - Death Benefits
  - Burial Gratuity
  - Disability Benefits
- Supplemental Assistant Program for OFW
- Welfare Assistance Program
  - Calamity Assistance for OWWA members and their families
  - Bereavement Assistance for OWWA Members who are not covered by regular death and burial benefits
  - Disability Assistance for OWWA Members who are sick and not covered under MEDPlus
  - Relief Assistance for OWWA Members who are displaced or laid off

== Organizational structure ==
Overseas Workers Welfare Administration consists of the following key people:

Board of Trustees

- Secretary Atty. Hans Leo Cadacdac, Chairman of Department of Migrant Workers (DMW)
- Administrator Atty. Patricia Yvonne Caunan, Vice-Chairman Overseas Workers Welfare Administration (OWWA)

Members

- Secretary Bienvenido Laguesma of Department of Labor and Employment (DOLE)
- Secretary Ma. Theresa P. Lazaro of Department of Foreign Affairs (DFA)
- Secretary Ralph G. Recto of Department of Finance (DOF)
- Secretary Amenah F. Pangandaman of Department of Budget and Management (DBM)
- President & CEO Robert Joseph De Claro of Social Security System (SSS)
- Captain Felixberto I. Rebustes of Sea-based Overseas Filipino Worker (OFW) Sector
- Women Sector
- Land-based Recruitment Sector
- Manning Sector

== See also ==
- Brain drain in the Philippines
- Commission on Filipinos Overseas
- Philippine Labor Migration Policy
- Philippine Overseas Employment Administration
