= OFW Hospital =

- Department of Migrant Workers
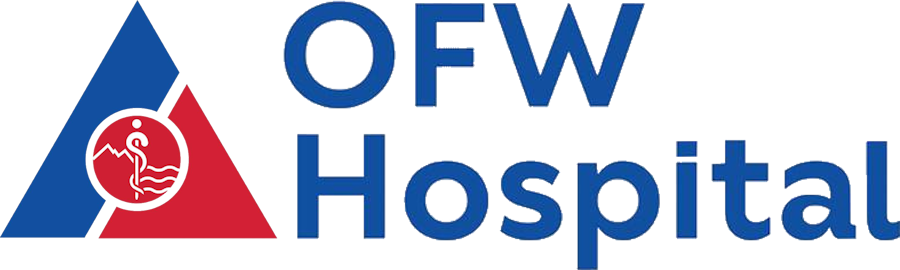

Geography
- Location: San Fernando, Pampanga, Philippines
- Coordinates: 15°04′50″N 120°38′15″E

Organization
- Type: Specialist

Services
- Emergency department: Yes
- Beds: 102
- Speciality: Medical services to Filipino migrant workers and their dependents

History
- Constructed: 2020
- Opened: May 2, 2022; 4 years ago

Links
- Website: www.ofwhospital.info
- Lists: Hospitals in the Philippines

The Overseas Filipino Workers (OFW) Hospital and Diagnostic Center, or simply the OFW Hospital, is a specialty hospital in San Fernando, Pampanga, Philippines. It is meant to cater to Filipino migrant workers.

== History ==
The Philippine government planned to set up a hospital dedicated to Filipino migrant workers, officially classified as Overseas Filipino Workers.

The provincial government of Pampanga donated the land where the hospital was built. Bloomberry Cultural Foundation Inc. of the Razon Group funded its construction.

The groundbreaking ceremony for the OFW Hospital was held on May 1, 2019. However, its construction did not begin until February 2020. The COVID-19 pandemic hampered the construction's progress. The Department of Labor and Employment (DOLE) and President Rodrigo Duterte, through an executive order, have fast-tracked the hospital project.

It began operating on May 2, 2022, with its polyclinic. It became fully operational in June 2022 when it was officially inaugurated. It largely catered to outpatients on its first months.

In April 2023, the Department of Migrant Workers (DMW) took over the hospital's operations from DOLE. However, the hospital remains underused as of July 2023.

== Facilities ==
The OFW Hospital has a bed capacity of 102. It is intended mainly to serve Overseas Filipino Workers (OFWs) and their dependents. The hospital building is seven-storeys high.

In 2024, President Marcos Jr., as tribute to Department of Migrant Workers's Secretary Ople, led the groundbreaking of the Hospital's Bagong Pilipinas Cancer Care Center, which is the country's third such facility. Its services include chemotherapy, diagnostic and cancer staging, plus surgical oncology.
