= Philippine PWD ID =

Disability identity document

PWD ID
- Typical format of a paper-printed PWD ID card
- Type: Disability Identity document
- Issued by: Philippines
- Purpose: Identification
- Valid in: Nationwide regardless of issuing local government unit
- Eligibility: Filipino citizenship; permanent disability or cancer/rare disease diagnosis
- Cost: Free of charge (initial issue)

The Persons with Disability identification card (PWD-ID) or the PWD ID is a type of identification document in the Philippines for disabled people.

== Basis ==
Disability ID cards or PWD cards are institutionalized in the Philippines via Republic Act 10754 or the Act Expanding the Benefits and Privileges of Persons with Disability.

== Issuance and eligibility ==
The ID cards issued at municipality or city-level specifically the local government unit's Persons with Disability Affairs Office (PDAO). According to the National Council on Disability Affairs (NCDA) Administrative Order No. 001 of 2008, cards are issued to people with permanent disabilities under the following classes:

- Speech impairment
- Learning disability
- Intellectual disability
- Mental disability
- Visual disability
- Psychosocial disability
- physical disability
- Deaf and hard-of-hearing
- Cancer
- Rare diseases

== Attached benefits ==
Holders of PWD cards can avail discounts and value added tax exemptions on certain goods and services.

- 20% discount on food, medicines, medical services, and entertainment like movies and concerts.
- Discounts on domestic travel (air, sea, and public transport).
- Priority access through express lanes in all establishments.

In 2022, Philippine government agencies release clarificatory memorandums stating that purchases online is also covered. Holders will just have to submit proof of their IDs to sellers/providers. This covers ride-hailing services such as Grab and Angkas.

Commuters of the LRT/MRT system can avail a special Beep smart card for discounted fares. They also have access to the first two doors of the first car of the train in the MRT-3 line along with seniors, pregnant women and people accompanying children.

== Design and layout ==
Unlike other Philippine identity documents such as the passport and the driver's license, there is no standard design and layout of PWD ID. It varies by issuing municipality or city.

In January 2025, the NCDA announced that it will be creating a unified PWD ID design with security features along with a database.

=== PWD ID Number ===
The PWD ID Number is based on the National Statistical Coordination Board's Philippine Standard Geographic Code. The Format is RR-PPMM-BBB-NNNNNNN where:

Number	Notes
RR	2-digits Region Code
PP	2-digits Province Code
MM	2-digits Municipality Code
BBB	3-digits Barangay Code (the default # is 000 unless specific barangays are issuing)
NNNNNNN	7-digits Sequential No.

In practice however, some local government units issue PWD IDs with slightly different numbering format. Such variation is that some localities use 5-digits sequential numbers instead of seven.

== Issuance by locality ==
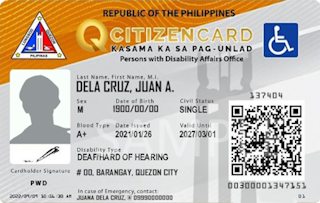
Orange QCitizen card issued by Quezon City for persons with disabilities.

Quezon City has its own unified ID card, the QCitizen ID, which can be issued to all of its residents which it launched in January 2021. The QCitizen ID with the orange strip, is the PWD ID and was first rolled out in August 2021.

== Fake and illicitly acquired cards ==
Ronnie Ong of Ang Probinsyano Party-list issued a resolution in the House of Representatives in 2020 calling for a probe on the proliferation of fake PWD cards citing a case of all six members of a family in Quezon City who are holders of individual PWD cards.

Resto PH, a group of restaurant owners, asserts multiple instances of whole families availing PWD discounts. In an August 2024 position paper they say that PWD discounts "are about to or are already exceeding that of senior citizens at an alarming rate in a substantial number of restaurants" despite there are more senior citizens than disabled people recorded as of the 2020 census.

Resto PH has fought for its rights to verify suspected fake PWD IDs.

There has been issues on verification of IDs through the Department of Health database with some legitimate holders not having their records appear. Also in practice some local government units do not follow consistent numbering format.

The Department of Justice released a legal opinion on January 27, 2025, that establishments cannot deny discounts even if their cards cannot be immediately verified.

The Department of Social Welfare and Development has launched a unified ID system in December 2024 to combat the proliferation of counterfeit ID cards.
