= Sentro ng Alternatibong Lingap Panligal =

Non-governmental organization in the Philippines

Sentro ng Alternatibong Lingap Panligal, also known as Sentro ng Alternatibong Lingap Panligan (abbreviated as SALIGAN), is a non-governmental legal organization based in Ateneo de Manila University in Diliman, Quezon City. Founded in 1987, it works with women, farmers, workers, the urban poor, the indigenous peoples and local communities, and marginalized sector. Vice President Leni Robredo is best known as the coordinator of the non-government organization in Naga City, especially in her winning case for the Sumilao Farmers of Bukidnon.

== Introduction ==
SALIGAN is the biggest and oldest member of Alternative Law Groups, Inc., a coalition of twenty four (24) law groups with similar aim and purpose.

As a non-government organization working for the marginalized sector, SALIGAN seeks to effect societal change by working towards the empowerment of women, basic sectors, and local communities through the creative use of the law and legal resources. It includes up to a hundred (100) partner-organizations all over the country, from Luzon, Visayas and Mindanao.

== Services ==
Being an advocacy-based law firm, SALIGAN includes legal literacy or alternative legal education, paralegal formation, litigation support, policy work, and research and publication, as its flagship services. It includes two branches outside Metro Manila, servicing the poorest regions of the country, one in Naga City that covers the Bicol Region and Davao City, covering the whole Mindanao.
