= Social Security System (Philippines) =

Public pension fund

- Native name: Paseguruhan ng mga Naglilingkod sa Pribado
- Type: Government-owned and controlled corporation (GOCC)
- Industry: Insurance
- Founded: September 1, 1957; 69 years ago
- Headquarters: SSS Building, East Avenue, Diliman, Quezon City, Philippines
- Key people: Victor Alfonso A. Limlingan (President and CEO)
- Services: Pension, Loan
- Revenue: ▲₱362.2 billion (2023)
- Net income: ▲₱83.13 billion (2023)
- Website: www.sss.gov.ph

The Social Security System (SSS; Filipino: Paseguruhan ng mga Naglilingkod sa Pribado) is a government-owned social insurance program in the Philippines to workers in the private, professional and informal sectors. SSS is established by virtue of Republic Act No. 1161, better known as the Social Security Act of 1954. This law was later amended by Republic Act No. 8282 in 1997. Government employees, meanwhile, are primarily covered under a separate pension fund by the Government Service Insurance System (GSIS) - they can also join the SSS at their own cost.

== History ==
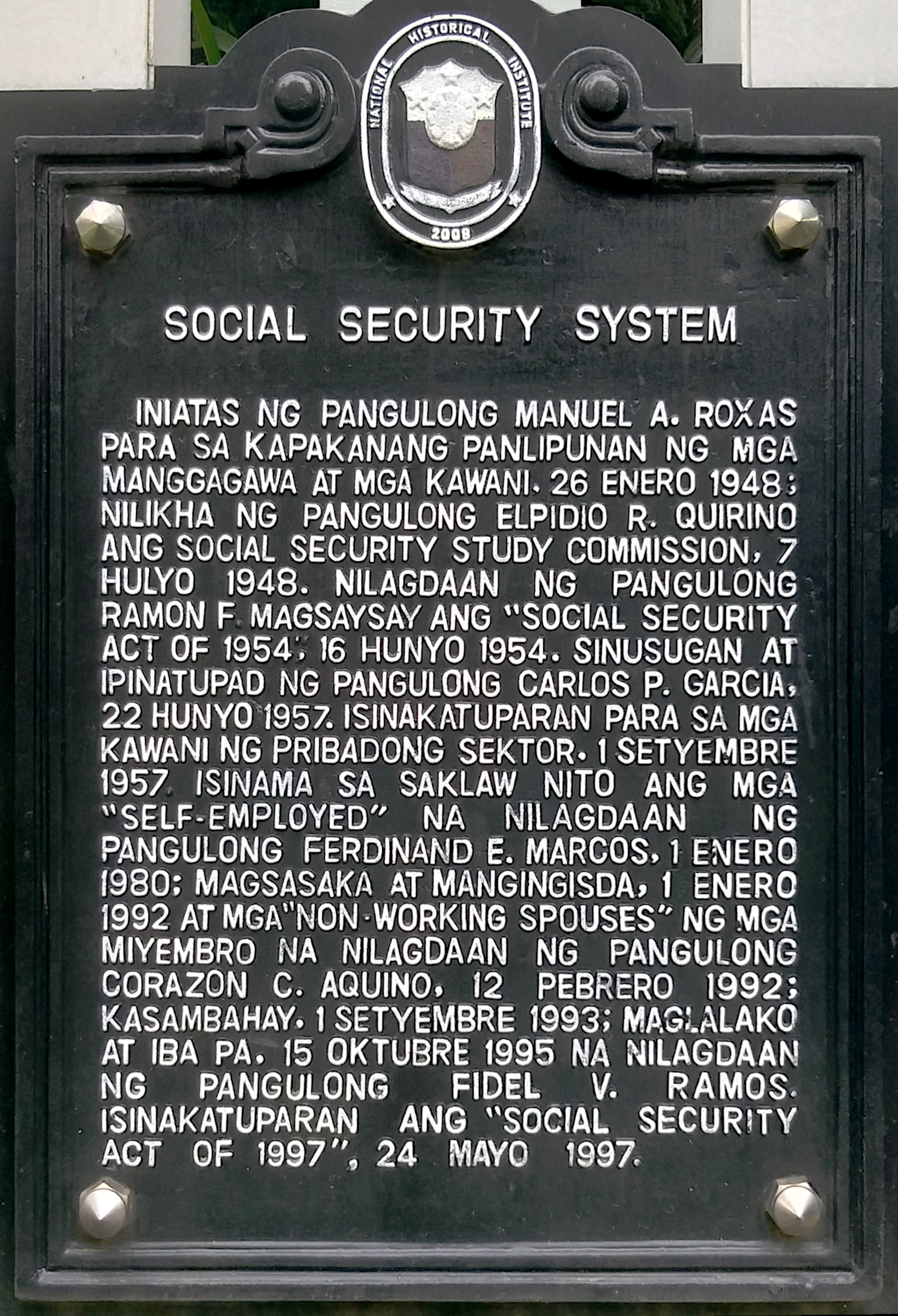
Historical marker installed in 2008 at the SSS head office in Quezon City

President Manuel Roxas, to give relief to the people who were facing difficulties in the post-war period, called on the legislators to create a social security program in his State of the Nation Address in January 1948 but he died before a bill was passed.

On July 7, 1948, President Elpidio Quirino succeeded Roxas and created the social security study commission through Executive Order No. 150. The commission drafted the Social Security Act that was submitted to Congress. In 1954, Representative Floro Crisologo, Senators Cipriano Primicias and Manuel Briones introduced bills to the Congress that were eventually enacted as Republic Act 1161 or the Social Security Act of 1954 during the term of Ramon Magsaysay. The law was also called the Social Security Law (SSS Law).

However, its implementation was delayed by objections made by business and labor groups. It was only in 1957 bills were presented in Congress creating the Republic Act No. 1792, amending the original Social Security Act. On September 1, 1957, the Social Security Act of 1954 was finally implemented under Carlos P. Garcia's term (Magsaysay died March that year).

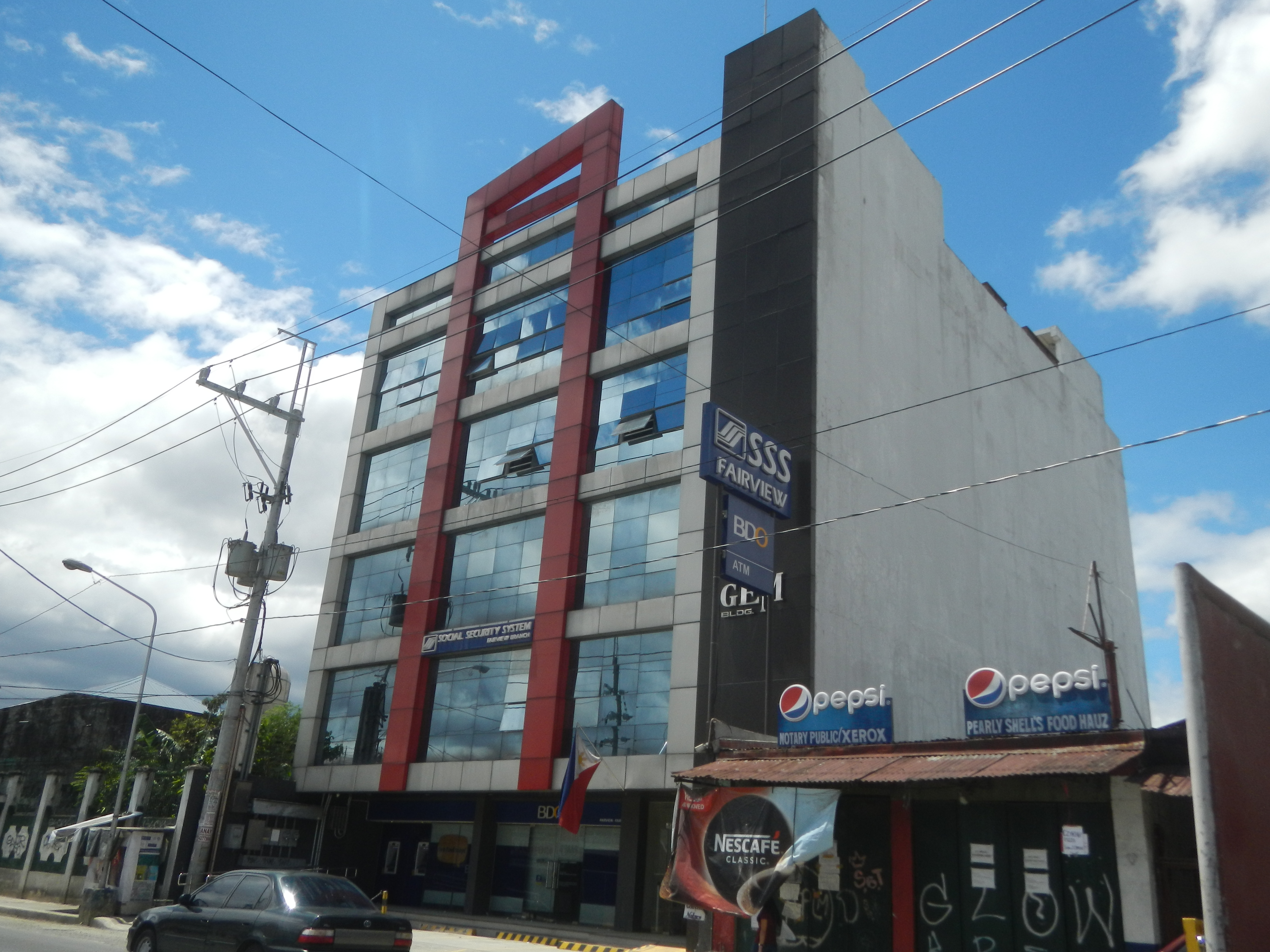
SSS, Fairview, Quezon City

On September 7, 1979, the Presidential Decree No. 1636 amended the Republic Act No. 1161 and extended compulsory coverage to people who identified as self-employed. The new rules which took effect on January 1, 1980. New rules allowed farmers and fisherfolks to be included in the coverage in 1992 and the year after, household helpers earning at least ₱1,000 monthly. The SSS, in 1995, covered laborers in informal sector earning the same wage monthly.

On May 1, 1997, President Fidel V. Ramos signed Republic Act No. 8282, also known as Social Security Act of 1997. The law amended the SSS and provided better benefit packages, expansion of coverage, flexibility in investments, stiffer penalties for violators of the law, condonation of penalties of delinquent employers, and the establishment of a voluntary provident fund for members.

SSS transferred the administration of its Medicare program, which gave benefits for the healthcare purposes of members, to the Philippine Health Insurance Corporation (PhilHealth) when Republic Act No. 7875 or the National Health Insurance Act of 1995 was enacted. In 2017, about 2.2 million people receiving pension from the SSS saw their take-home benefits increased by ₱1,000 with the approval of President Rodrigo Duterte.

Starting with a fund of ₱500,000 from the government, SSS' total assets grew to ₱474.7 billion and served 34.2 million members in 2016. In 2018, the Republic Act No. 11199 or the Social Security Act of 2018 was passed, providing mandatory inclusion of Filipinos working domestically and internationally.

In September 2025 the Social Security System launched a three-year pension reform program which includes incremental pension increases (10 % for retirement/disability and 5 % for death/survivor pensioners) without a corresponding increase in contributions.

== Services ==
SSS provides death, funeral, maternity leave, permanent disability, retirement, sickness and involuntary separation/unemployment benefits. The Employees' Compensation (EC) Program which started in 1975 provided double compensation to workers who had illness, accident during work-related activities, or died. EC benefits are granted only to members with employers other than themselves.

SSS members can make 'salary' or 'calamity' loans. Salary loans are calculated based on a member's particular monthly salary credit. Calamity loans are for instances when the government has declared a state of calamity in the area where an SSS member lives, following disasters such as flooding and earthquakes.

=== PESO Fund ===
The SSS PESO (Personal Equity Savings Option) Fund is a voluntary savings program that members can utilize to augment their retirement benefits from the regular membership. Launched in September 2014, it is a provident fund that gives tax-free returns and it can be made available effective upon the retirement of the members or when certain conditions are met, such as permanent disability. The fund gives members the power to choose beneficiaries, and it provides three account options: medical expenses, retirement and disability, and other needs.

=== Flexi Fund ===
Flexi Fund is a voluntary savings program offered by SSS. Launched in 2001, it is a provident fund that is invested in fixed income securities and whose returns are determined by SSS' short-term placements or 91-day Treasury bills. It is open to overseas Filipino workers (OFW) who are not older than 60 years old.

=== WISP ===
WISP carried a 5.33% annual rate of return.

=== WISP Plus ===
WISP carried a 6.87% annual rate of return.

=== MySSS Pension Booster ===
On June 10, 2024, SSS President Rolando Ledesma Macasaet re-branded the 'Worker’s Investment and Savings Program' (WISP) to 'MySSS Pension Booster', which offers a 7.2% annual rate of return to upgrade retirement and savings in line with Social Security Act of 2018 reforms. Formerly, WISP and WISP Plus carried a 5.33% and 6.87% return, respectively. The Booster is composed of both mandatory and voluntary schemes.

== Membership requirements ==
- He/she must be at least 15 years old.
- Non-working persons are welcome.
- In order for a member of SSS to claim lifetime monthly pension, he must be at least 60 years old and he must have at least 120 monthly contributions.

== Branches ==
SSS' offices are located in 291 branches all over the country. There is an option to email or make a call to SSS’ branches. Members can utilize the toll-free number that is open on weekdays and online services for transactions such as securing SSS identification number and applying for loans, sickness and retirement benefits.

== List of chairpersons ==
- Carlos Arellano (February 26, 1986 – January 16, 2001)
- Corazon dela Paz (January 20, 2001 – July 31, 2008)
- Romulo Neri (August 2008 – June 30, 2010)
- Juan B. Santos (August 23, 2010 – June 30, 2016)
- Amado D. Valdez (October 2016 – February 12, 2018)
- Aurora C. Ignacio (September 2018 – March 4, 2019)
- Carlos G. Dominguez III (March 5, 2019 – June 30, 2022)
- Benjamin Diokno (June 30, 2022 – January 11, 2024)
- Ralph G. Recto (January 12, 2024 to present)
