= Disability identity document =

Document proving disability status

A disability identity document is a document proving one's status as a person with disability. It may give access to benefits solely reserved for disabled people.

== Policies ==
=== Cambodia ===
The Ministry of Social Affairs, Veterans and Youth Rehabilitation launched its disability ID card program in 2023. Its development began in 2020 with the help of UNICEF and the European Union.

=== European Union ===
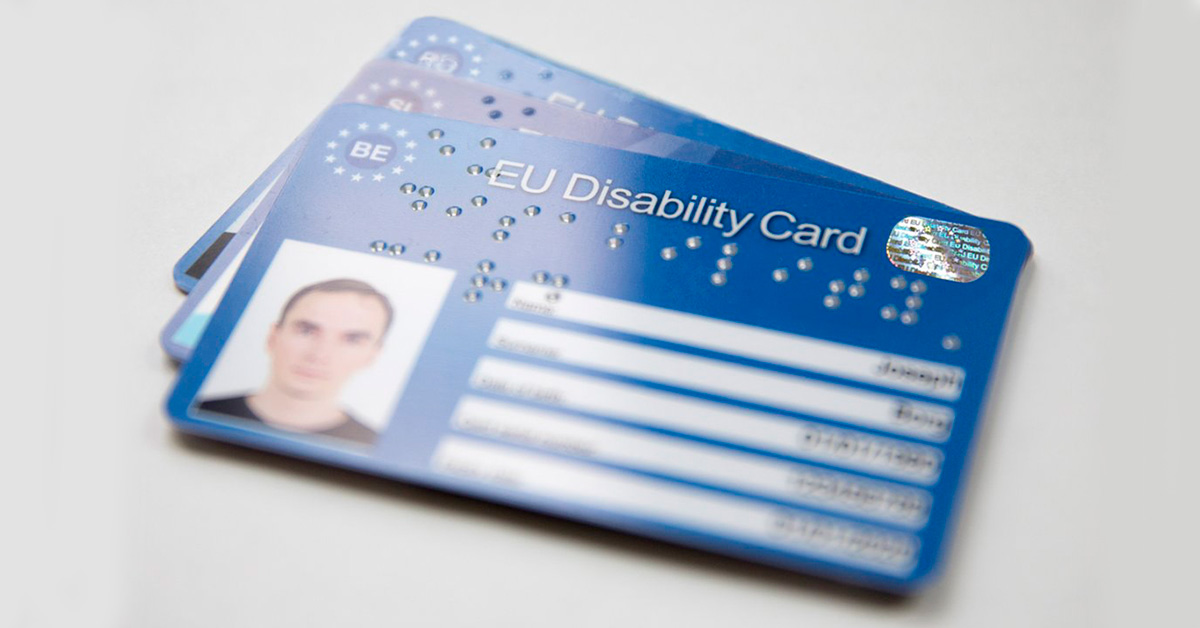
European disability card

The European disability card scheme was launched in February 2016 as a pilot program in eight member states; Belgium, Cyprus, Estonia, Finland, Italy, Malta, Romania and Slovenia. It was agreed to expand the program to the rest of the bloc in 8 February 2024.

Holders are given access to discounts on local transport, assistance when using public transport, reduced or zero entry fees, priority access and reserved parking.

=== Japan ===
Disability passbooks (障がい者手帳, Shogaisha techo) are issued to residents of Japan. It allows holders access to discounts on public transportation and benefits in tourist attractions and public facilities.

=== Philippines ===
Disability ID cards or PWD cards are institutionalized in the Philippines via Republic Act 10754 or the Act Expanding the Benefits and Privileges of Persons with Disability. Holders of PWD cards can avail discounts and value added tax exemptions on certain goods and services.

The ID cards issued at municipality or city-level specifically the local government unit's Persons with Disability Affairs Office (PDAO). According to the National Council on Disability Affairs (NCDA) Administrative Order No. 001 of 2008, cards are issued to people with permanent disabilities under the following classes: speech impairment, learning disability, intellectual disability, mental disability, visual disability, psychosocial disability, physical disability, deaf and hard-of-hearing, cancer and rare diseases.

The Department of Social Welfare and Development has launched a unified ID system in December 2024 to combat to proliferation of counterfeit ID cards.
