= Department of Migrant Workers =

Executive department of the Philippine government

- Kagawaran ng Manggagawang Mandarayuhan
- Official Seal

- DMW Building in Mandaluyong

Department overview
- Formed: February 3, 2022; 4 years ago
- Preceding agencies: Philippine Overseas Employment Administration; Office of the Presidential Adviser on OFW Concerns
- Jurisdiction: Government of the Philippines
- Headquarters: EDSA corner Ortigas Avenue, Mandaluyong
- Employees: 506 (2024)
- Department executive: Hans Leo Cacdac, Secretary
- Child agencies: Overseas Workers Welfare Administration; National Maritime Polytechnic
- Key document: Department of Migrant Workers Act
- Website: dmw.gov.ph

The Department of Migrant Workers (DMW; Filipino: Kagawaran ng Manggagawang Mandarayuhan) is the executive department of the Philippine government responsible for the protection of the rights and promotion of the welfare of Overseas Filipino Workers (OFW) and their families. The department was created under the Department of Migrant Workers Act (Republic Act No. 11641) that was signed by President Rodrigo Duterte on December 30, 2021. The functions and mandate of the Philippine Overseas Employment Administration (POEA) and the Office of the Presidential Adviser on OFW Concerns (OPAOC) will serve as the backbone of the department and absorb the seven offices of the Department of Labor and Employment (DOLE) and Department of Foreign Affairs (DFA) namely the Office of the Undersecretary for Migrant Workers' Affairs (OUMWA) of the DFA, Philippine Overseas Labor Office (POLO), International Labor Affairs Bureau (ILAB), National Reintegration Center for OFWs (NRCO) and the National Maritime Polytechnic (NMP) of the DOLE. The Overseas Workers Welfare Administration (from DOLE) will serve as its attached agency and the DMW secretary will serve as the concurrent chairperson of OWWA.

The department is also mandated to closely coordinate with the Bangsamoro Ministry of Labor and Employment (MOLE) on the training, protection and regulation of deployment of overseas Moro workers.

== History ==
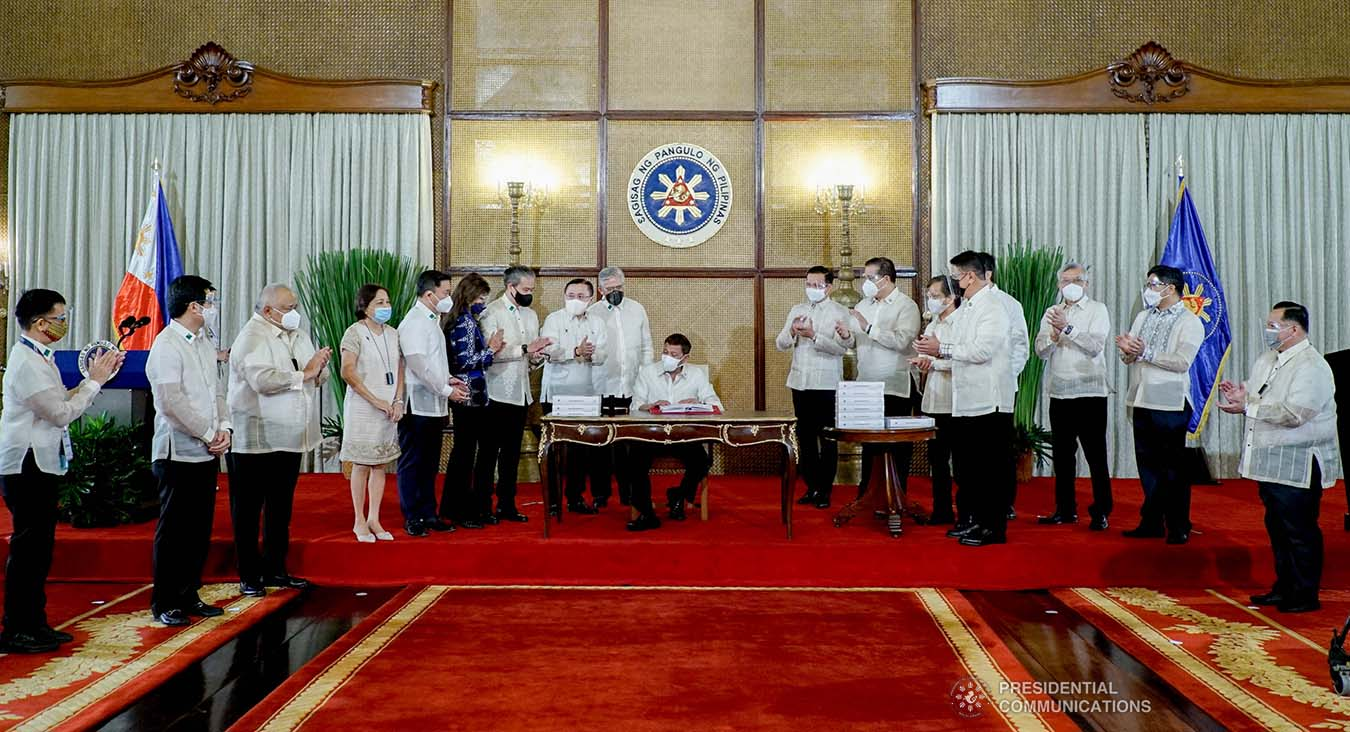
President Duterte signing Republic Act No. 11641 or the Act Creating the Department of Migrant Workers (DMW) on December 30, 2021.

On July 12, 2019, during the Araw ng Pasasalamat for OFWs (Thanksgiving Day for the Overseas Filipino Workers), President Duterte in a speech promised to finish the framework for the creation of a department that caters to the need of OFWs.

On July 23, 2019, Taguig-Pateros Representative and Speaker Alan Peter Cayetano together with Representative Lani Cayetano of Taguig and Representative Paolo Duterte of Davao City filed House Bill No. 00002 and was referred to the Congressional Committee on Government Reorganization and Committee on Overseas Workers Affairs. On March 11, 2020, the House of Representatives with 173 yeas and 11 nays, approved House Bill No. 5832 or the creation of Department of Filipinos Overseas and Foreign Employment.

During his final State of the Nation Address on July 26, 2021, President Duterte marked House Bill No. 5832 as urgent and urged the Senate to pass the bill. Senator Joel Villanueva filed Senate Bill No. 1848 or the Department of Overseas Filipinos Act. Subsequent bills were filed in the Senate and were consolidated under Senate Bill No. 2234. Senate Minority Leader Franklin Drilon introduced several institutional amendments that delimit the scope of the new department to overseas migrant workers and the welfare of Filipinos overseas will be handled by the Department of Foreign Affairs. On December 14, 2021, the Senate unanimously (20–0–0) approved Senate Bill No. 2234 The following day, the House chose to adopt SB No. 2234 over its House Bill No. 5832 understanding the urgent certification of the President.

On December 30, 2021, Rizal Day, President Duterte signed Republic Act No. 11641 to approve the creation of the Department of Migrant Workers.

On December 3, 2024, DMW unveiled its Official Logo during the "Collaborative Pathways: Advancing International Partnerships for OFWs" event held at the Susan V. Ople Building in Makati City.

== Organizational structure ==
The department is currently headed by a secretary with the following undersecretaries and assistant secretaries:

- Undersecretary for Licensing and Adjudication Services
- Undersecretary for Migrant Workers’ Welfare and Foreign Employment
- Undersecretary for Policy and International Cooperation
- Undersecretary for Finance and Internal Affairs
- Assistant Secretary for Land-Based Services
- Assistant Secretary/Chief of Staff, Office of the Secretary
- Assistant Secretary for Pre-Employment Services
- Assistant Secretary for Migrant Workers’ Welfare Services
- Assistant Secretary for Licensing and Adjudication Services
- Assistant Secretary for Sea-Based Services
- Assistant Secretary for Internal Management and Administration
- Assistant Secretary for Reintegration

== Secretaries ==
Portrait	Name (Birth–Death)	Took office	Left office	President
	Abdullah Mama-o; Interim	March 9, 2022	June 30, 2022	Rodrigo Duterte
	Susan Ople (1962–2023)	June 30, 2022	August 22, 2023 (Note: Died in office.)	Bongbong Marcos
	Hans Cacdac (Note: Hans Cacdac served as Officer in Charge from September 7, 2023 until April 25, 2024.) (born 1968)	September 7, 2023	April 25, 2024	Bongbong Marcos
	Hans Cacdac (born 1968)	April 26, 2024	Incumbent	Bongbong Marcos

== Sub-departments and agencies ==
- Overseas Workers Welfare Administration (OWWA)
- Undersecretary for Internal Management and Administration (from POEA)
- Undersecretary for Foreign Employment and Welfare Services (from POEA, OUMWA, NRCO)
- Undersecretary for Licensing and Adjudication (from POEA)
- Undersecretary for Policy and International Cooperation (from ILAB)
- Migrant Workers Office (MWO)
- Migrant Workers Resource Center (MWRC)
- National Maritime Polytechnic (NMP)
- Maritime Industry Tripartite Council (MITC)
- Overseas Land-based Tripartite Consultative Council (OLTCC)
- Office of the Social Welfare Attaché (OSWA)
- Overseas Filipino Bank (OFBank), in association with Department of Finance
- Overseas Filipino Hospital (OFH), in association with Department of Health
