= Philippine Overseas Employment Administration =

Former Philippine government agency

- Pangasiwaan ng Pilipinas sa Empleo sa Ibayong-dagat

Agency overview
- Formed: May 1, 1982
- Dissolved: February 3, 2022; 4 years ago
- Superseding agency: Department of Migrant Workers
- Headquarters: EDSA corner Ortigas Avenue, Mandaluyong
- Employees: 357 (2022)
- Annual budget: ₱507.76 million (2021)
- Parent agency: Department of Labor and Employment
- Website: poea.gov.ph (Inactive)

The Philippine Overseas Employment Administration (POEA; Filipino: Pangasiwaan ng Pilipinas sa Empleo sa Ibayong-dagat) was an agency of the government of the Philippines responsible for opening the benefits of the overseas employment program of the Philippines. It is the main government agency assigned to monitor and supervise overseas recruitment and manning agencies in the Philippines. The POEA's office is located at EDSA corner Ortigas Avenue, Mandaluyong, Philippines.

== History ==
The Philippine Overseas Employment Administration was established in 1982 through Executive Order No. 797. The goal of the agency's establishment was to promote and monitor the overseas employment of Filipino workers. The POEA was reorganized in 1987 through Executive Order No. 247 in order to respond to changing markets and economic conditions, and to strengthen components that would protect Filipino workers and the regulatory components of the overseas employment program.

The Migrant Workers and Overseas Filipinos Act of 1995 instituted State policies of overseas employment and established standards for protection and promotion of welfare for migrant workers and their families, and for overseas Filipinos in distress. The act specifies, "Migrant worker refers to a person who is to be engaged, is engaged or has been engaged in a remunerated activity in a state of which he or she is not a legal resident; to be used interchangeably with overseas Filipino worker.". Regarding deployment of migrant workers, the act mandates, "The State shall deploy overseas Filipino workers only in countries where the rights of Filipino migrant workers are protected. ...".

In 2010, Republic Act No. 10022 amended some of these provisions, including those quoted above. Among other changes, the paragraph defining the term migrant worker was amended to read, "'Overseas Filipino worker' refers to a person who is to be engaged, is engaged or has been engaged in a remunerated activity in a state of which he or she is not a citizen or on board a vessel navigating the foreign seas other than a government ship used for military or non-commercial purposes or on an installation located offshore or on the high seas; to be used interchangeably with migrant worker.", and the introductory text regarding deployment was amended to read, "The State shall allow the deployment of overseas Filipino workers only in countries where the rights of Filipino migrant workers are protected. ...".

On December 30, 2021, President Rodrigo Duterte signed Republic Act. No. 11641 creating the Department of Migrant Workers, elevating POEA as an executive department and absorbing the seven offices of the Department of Labor and Employment and Department of Foreign Affairs namely Office of the Undersecretary for Migrant Workers' Affairs (OUMWA) of the DFA, Philippine Overseas Labor Office (POLO), International Labor Affairs Bureau (ILAB), National Reintegration Center for OFWs (NRCO) and the National Maritime Polytechnic (NMP) of the DOLE. The Overseas Workers Welfare Administration (from DOLE) will serve as its attached agency and the DMW secretary will serve as the concurrent chairperson of OWWA.

== Core functions ==
- Industry Regulation

1. Issues license to engage in overseas recruitment and manning to private recruitment agencies and ship manning companies

2. Hears and arbitrates complaints and cases filed against recruitment and manning agencies, foreign principals and employers, and overseas workers for reported violation of POEA rules and regulations, except for money claims

3. Implements a system of incentives and penalty for private sector participants

4. Sets minimum labor standards

5. Monitors overseas job advertisements on print, broadcast and television

6. Supervises the government's program on anti-illegal recruitment

7. Imposes disciplinary actions on erring employers and workers and seafarers

- Employment Facilitation

1. Accredits/registers foreign principals and employers hiring Filipino workers

2. Approves manpower requests of foreign principals and employers

3. Evaluates and processes employment contracts

4. Assists departing workers at the ports of exit

5. Develops and monitors markets and conducts market research

6. Conducts marketing missions

7. Enters into memorandum of understanding on the hiring of Filipino workers with labor–receiving countries

8. Facilitates the deployment of workers hired through government-to-government arrangement

9. Provides a system of worker's registry

- Worker's Protection

1. Intensifies public education and information campaign

2. Conducts pre-employment orientation and anti-illegal recruitment seminars nationwide

3. Conducts Pre-Deployment Orientation Seminars (PDOS) to workers hired through the government-to-government arrangement and name hires

4. Provides technical assistance in the drafting of bilateral and multilateral agreements

5. Provides legal assistance to victims of illegal recruitment

6. OFW global mapping and profiling

7. Implements gender-sensitive programs

8. Networks with non-government organizations, workers’ organizations, etc.

9. Provides repatriation assistance

10. Provides a system of worker's registry

- General Administration and Support Services

1. Human Resources Development

2. Property and Supplies Management

3. Financial Management

4. Information and Communication Technology

5. Plans and Policy Development

6. Quality Management System

== Deployment restrictions ==
On November 1, 2011, the POEA Governing Board (GB) published GB Resolution No.7, which specifies a list of 41 countries where OFWs cannot be deployed for non-compliance with the guarantees required under R.A. 10022. As of November 2011 the POEA lists 125 countries as being compliant with the guarantees required under R.A. 10022.

The process of obtaining a POEA exit clearances has been described in the Philippine press as a "nightmare". In a Philippine Daily Inquirer piece dated July 14, 2011, Rigoberto Tiglao, Philippine ambassador to Greece and Cyprus, questioned the POEA exit clearances, opining that they may be unconstitutional.

== See also ==
- Brain drain in the Philippines
- Commission on Filipinos Overseas
- Overseas Workers Welfare Administration
- Philippine Labor Migration Policy
