= Overseas Filipino Worker =

Overseas Filipino Workers
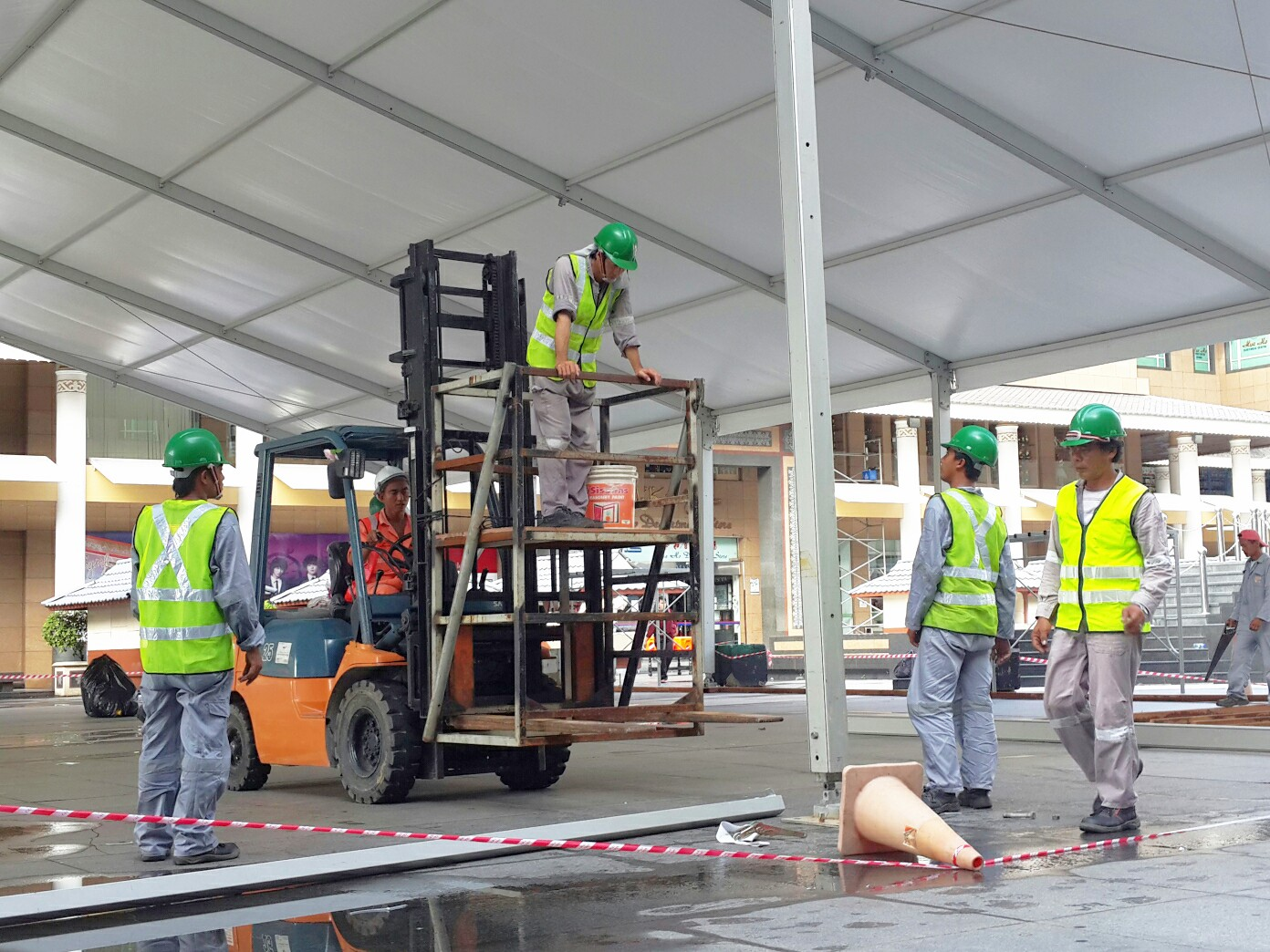
- OFWs in Brunei

Total population
- 2.3 million (2019)

Regions with significant populations
- Saudi Arabia: 494,000
- United Arab Emirates: 291,000
- Hong Kong: 165,000
- Taiwan: 147,234
- Kuwait: 136,000
- Qatar: 123,000

Languages
- Filipino (national), English (co-official); Philippine languages, Arabic

Religion
- Christianity (majority), Islam

Related ethnic groups
- Filipinos (Overseas Filipinos)

Overseas Filipino Worker (OFW) is a term often used to refer to Filipino migrant workers, people with Filipino citizenship who reside in another country for a limited period of employment. The number of these workers was roughly 1.77 million between April and September 2020. Of these, female workers comprised a larger portion, making up 59.6 percent, or 1.06 million. However, this number declined to 405.62 thousand between 2019 and 2020. From April to September 2025, the number of OFWs had recovered to an estimated 2.05 million per the Philippine Statistics Authority's 2025 Survey on Overseas Filipinos, while total remittances for the period reached ₱240.73 billion.

OFW money remittances to relatives in the Philippines are a major contributor to the Philippine economy, reaching a total of P1.9 trillion in 2022, which represented some 8.9% of the Philippines' Gross Domestic Product.

== Etymology ==
The term "Overseas Filipino Worker" (OFW) was used as early as the 1990s to refer to Filipino migrant workers, when Republic Act 8042, also known as the Migrant Workers and Overseas Filipinos Act of 1995, was enacted. The term was officially adopted by the Philippine government when the Philippine Overseas Employment Administration (POEA) formulated the 2002 POEA Rules and Regulations Governing the Recruitment and Employment of Land-based Overseas Workers. Historically, particularly during the administration of President Ferdinand Marcos, the term "Overseas Contract Worker" (OCW) was used.

For statistical and probability purposes, the term "Overseas Contract Worker" refers to OFWs with an active employment contract, while OFWs who are not OCWs are migrant workers currently without a contract who had one within a given period of time.

== History ==
=== Early 1900s ===
Filipino migrant workers were working outside the Philippine islands as early as the 1900s, when Filipino agricultural workers were deployed to Hawaii to satisfy temporary labor needs in the then-U.S. territory's agricultural sector. Filipino workers then went on to the Mainland United States to work in hotels, restaurants, and sawmills, as well as getting involved in railroad construction. They also worked in plantations in California and the canning industry of the then-American territory of Alaska. Some Filipinos also served in the U.S. Army during World War II.

=== After World War II ===
Following the end of World War II, some Filipinos who served in the U.S. Army became American citizens. The United States also saw increased immigration of Filipino medical professionals, accountants, engineers, and other technical workers after the war. From the 1950s to the 1960s, non-professional contract workers began migrating to other Asian countries; artists, barbers, and musicians worked in East Asia, and loggers worked in Kalimantan, the Indonesian portion of the island of Borneo.

=== Start of systemic migration ===
According to the Philippine Department of Labor and Employment, "active and systemic migration" of Filipinos for temporary employment began by the 1960s, when the United States government, contractors of the US Armed Forces, and civilian agencies began recruiting Filipinos to work in jobs in the construction and service sector. This was encouraged by the passage in the US of the Immigration and Nationality Act of 1965, which ended national immigration quotas and provided an unlimited number of visas for family reunification. Filipinos also worked in select areas in the Pacific and Southeast Asia, namely Japan, Thailand, Vietnam, and the US territories of Guam and Wake Island.

Overseas employment first became the subject of Philippine government policy in the early 1970s, in response to a series of crises brought about by heavy government spending linked to Ferdinand Marcos' 1969 campaign for his second presidential term. Beginning with the 1969 Philippine balance of payments crisis, these resulted in a spike in unemployment, an urgent need for foreign exchange to resolve the country's balance of payments, and a period of social unrest that kicked off with what is now known as the First Quarter Storm. More Filipino medical workers began to search for work in Australia, Canada, and the United States. This compelled the Marcos administration to create a short-term labor policy that included overseas employment.

In 1974—two years after Marcos' proclamation of martial law—the Philippine government came up with the Labor Code of the Philippines (Presidential Decree 442, series 1974), which included Filipino migrant workers in its scope. The decree formally established a recruitment and placement program "to ensure the careful selection of Filipino workers for the overseas labor market to protect the good name of the Philippines abroad". Three government agencies were created to tend to the needs of Filipino migrant workers: the National Seamen Board, Overseas Employment Development Board, and the Bureau of Employment Services, which were later merged in 1978 to create the Philippine Overseas Employment Administration.

The Marcos administration continued to expand the policy, since it served a double function: it helped relieve economic pressure by bringing in dollar revenues, and it also relieved social pressure, because many of the highly educated young people who formed the bulk of Marcos' political critics left the country to find work.

Soon, construction workers and engineers also began to be recruited by multinational companies in oil-rich nations in the Middle East, which were then experiencing an economic boom.

=== Post–People Power Revolution ===
After Ferdinand Marcos was removed from office following the People Power Revolution of February 1986, his successor Corazon Aquino issued Executive Order No. 126, which renamed the Welfare Fund as the Overseas Workers Welfare Administration (OWWA). In 1995, the Republic Act 8042, or Migrant Workers and Overseas Filipinos Act, became law.

700,000 of the world's mariners come from the Philippines, being the world's largest origin of seafarers; In 2018, Filipino seafarers sent home the equivalent of US$6.14 billion.

Then-President Rodrigo Duterte announced that in 2021, the Philippines would limit the annual number of health professionals (including nurses) it sends abroad to 5,000, from about 13,000 that currently leave every year.

== Magna Carta of Filipino seafarers ==
Department of Foreign Affairs undersecretary Eduardo De Vega has put forward the so-called "Magna Carta for Seafarers", a bill that was to be signed by President Bongbong Marcos in February 2024 but was put on hold for review. Senate Bill No. 2221, "An Act Providing for the Magna Carta of Filipino Seafarers" (and the House of Representatives' version, House Bill 7325, approved on March 6, 2024) "seeks to provide seafarers with the right to humane working conditions and just compensation by ensuring that recruitment agencies provide them with adequate information about onboard conditions and laws that apply to Filipino seafarers; it also aims to address the lack of domestic laws vis-à-vis the country's compliance with international maritime standards, as well as the seafarers' rights and welfare."

On September 23, 2024, President Marcos signed into law Republic Act No. 12021, or the Magna Carta of Filipino Seafarers, which provides protection for domestic and overseas Filipino seafarers. In October 2024, the Department of Migrant Workers announced that the Aksyon Fund, a financial assistance program, should benefit not only OFWs currently abroad but also those stationed in Migrant Workers' Offices and those who have yet to leave the country. Justice Secretary Jesus Crispin Remulla clarified in a legal opinion that the fund "comes without restriction or qualification", and the definition of OFWs includes individuals regardless of their migration status. This ensures broader access to support under the fund for all OFWs. On January 8, 2025, President Marcos signed its Implementing Rules and Regulations.

== Government policy ==
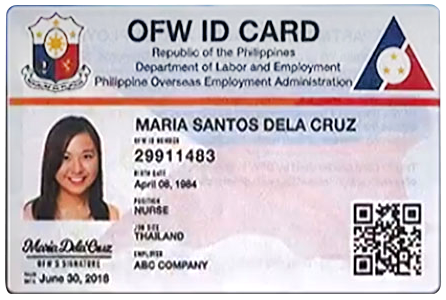
Official sample of an Overseas Filipino Worker (OFW) ID card

The Philippine government has stated officially for decades that it doesn't maintain a labor export policy, and has continued to claim so as of 2012.

=== Agencies ===
During the presidency of Ferdinand Marcos, three government agencies were created to tend to the needs of Filipino migrant workers, namely:

1. National Seamen Board (NSB) : To "develop and maintain a comprehensive program for Filipino seamen employed overseas".
2. Overseas Employment Development Board (OEDB) – To "promote the overseas employment of Filipino workers through a comprehensive market and development program".
3. Bureau of Employment Services (BES) – responsible for the regulation of "private sector participation in the recruitment of (local and overseas) workers".

In 1982, these three agencies were consolidated to create the Philippine Overseas Employment Administration (POEA), which later became an attached agency to the Department of Labor and Employment. On December 30, 2021, then-President Duterte signed into law the "Department of Migrant Workers Act" (Republic Act 11641), which consolidates all OFW-related services into one department. The new Department of Migrant Workers is slated to be operational by 2023.

=== Reception ===
The Migrante Partylist has cited two reasons that the Philippine government created a more systemic labor export policy during the administration of Ferdinand Marcos: To quell dissent brought about by massive domestic unemployment and the political crisis, and to consolidate foreign exchange from remittances.

== Recruitment ==
The Philippine Overseas Employment Administration (POEA) was a government agency tasked with supervising labor recruitment agencies in the Philippines. Recruitment and deployment agencies are mandated by the POEA to monitor the situation of Overseas Filipino Workers, including if they are with their supposed employers and if employers provide assistance to the Filipino worker in case of emergency.

== Taxation ==
Remittances sent by Overseas Filipino Workers to the Philippines from abroad are not themselves subject to taxation by the Philippine government, which has no jurisdiction over foreign remittance. However, a value-added tax is imposed on transfer fees charged by the remittance companies. Under Presidential Decree No. 1183 and Republic Act No.8042, or the Migrant Workers and Overseas Filipino Act of 1995, Overseas Filipino Workers are exempt from travel tax and airport terminal fees when traveling out of the Philippines from within the country.

== Female overseas Filipino workers ==
Despite many Filipina migrant workers having received higher education and working as skilled nurses, 58 out of 100 overseas Filipino women workers are categorized as laborers and unskilled workers compared to 13 out of 100 overseas Filipino male workers in a 2007 survey. Filipino women often fill "the demand for unskilled, low-paid domestic work in high-income countries". They are encouraged to take these overseas jobs due to high unemployment rates in the Philippines and the economy benefiting from remittances.

=== Medical concerns ===
A study conducted by Veronica Ramirez of the Center for Research and Communication has found that because they are afraid of losing employment and since most clinics are closed on Sundays, which is the typical OFW's day off, a majority of female OFWs find it difficult to obtain medical treatment, resorting to self-medication instead.

=== Mental health concerns ===
Despite financial benefits from working overseas, separation from family and cultural ties have proved detrimental to the health of Filipino migrant workers. Many Filipino women working abroad have experienced worsening mental health, reporting symptoms of depression from a loss of belonging, loneliness, and guilt.

Unsafe workplaces and abuse are another big problem, with "more than 40% of labour Filipino migrants in the USA report[ing] high levels of workplace discrimination". Filipino women are often associated with stereotypes such as being mail-order brides and having submissive attributes, which further adds to their discrimination in and out of the workplace.

=== Impact on governance ===
Empirical research has demonstrated that Filipino migrants and the remittances they send back to families are correlated with better governance. Exposure to the democratic politics and efficient bureaucracies in host countries allows migrants to use their remittances to urge relatives back home to demand better governance, at least in the context of enhancing the efficient provision of public goods at the provincial level.

== Countries ==
Overseas Filipino Workers can only be legally deployed to countries certified by the Philippine Department of Foreign Affairs to be compliant with Republic Act 10022, also known as the Amended Migrant Workers Act.

== See also ==
- Overseas Filipinos
- Human trafficking in the Philippines
- Flor Contemplacion
- Indonesian migrant workers
