= Visa policy of the Philippines =

Policy on permits required to enter the Philippines

Most visitors to the Philippines may enter without a visa for up to 30 or 59 days.

However, citizens of certain countries must obtain an e-Visa or, if they are not eligible, obtain a visa from one of the Philippine diplomatic missions.

All visitors must hold a passport valid for at least 6 months from the date of arrival.

== Visa policy map ==
Visa policy of the Philippines The Philippines Visa not required (59 days) Visa not required (30 days) Visa not required (14 days) eVisa Visa required

== Visa exemption ==
=== Ordinary passports ===
Citizens of the following countries and territories may enter the Philippines for stays up to the duration listed below. Visa-exempt citizens are generally admitted for an initial period of 30 days and may obtain a 29-day visa waiver, followed by extensions of 1, 2 or 6 months. Their total period of stay may not exceed 36 months from the date of their most recent arrival.

59 days

- Brazil
- Israel

30 days

- ASEAN member states (except Timor-Leste)
- All European Union member states

- Andorra
- Angola
- Antigua and Barbuda
- Argentina
- Australia
- Bahamas
- Bahrain
- Barbados
- Belize
- Benin
- Bhutan
- Bolivia
- Botswana
- Burkina Faso
- Burundi
- Cameroon
- Canada
- Cape Verde
- Central African Republic
- Chad
- Chile
- Colombia
- Comoros
- Republic of the Congo
- DR Congo
- Costa Rica
- Djibouti
- Dominica
- Dominican Republic
- Ecuador
- El Salvador
- Equatorial Guinea
- Eritrea
- Eswatini
- Ethiopia
- Fiji
- Gabon
- Gambia
- Ghana
- Grenada
- Guatemala
- Guinea
- Guinea-Bissau
- Guyana
- Haiti
- Honduras
- Iceland
- Ivory Coast
- Jamaica
- Japan
- Kazakhstan
- Kenya
- Kiribati
- Kuwait
- Kyrgyzstan
- Lesotho
- Liberia
- Liechtenstein
- Madagascar
- Malawi
- Maldives
- Mali
- Marshall Islands
- Mauritania
- Mauritius
- Mexico
- Micronesia
- Monaco
- Mongolia
- Morocco
- Mozambique
- Namibia
- Nepal
- New Zealand
- Nicaragua
- Niger
- Norway
- Oman
- Palau
- Panama
- Papua New Guinea
- Paraguay
- Peru
- Qatar
- Russia
- Rwanda
- Saint Kitts and Nevis
- Saint Lucia
- Saint Vincent and the Grenadines
- Samoa
- San Marino
- São Tomé and Príncipe
- Saudi Arabia
- Senegal
- Seychelles
- Solomon Islands
- South Africa
- South Korea
- Suriname
- Switzerland
- Tajikistan
- Tanzania
- Togo
- Trinidad and Tobago
- Tunisia
- Turkey
- Turkmenistan
- Tuvalu
- Uganda
- United Arab Emirates
- United Kingdom
- United States
- Uruguay
- Uzbekistan
- Vanuatu
- Vatican City
- Venezuela
- Zambia
- Zimbabwe

14 days

- China^{T1 1 2 3}
- Hong Kong^{3}
- India^{1 4}
- Macau^{3}
- Portugal^{5}
- Taiwan^{T2} ^{1 4}

7 days

- United Kingdom^{6}

_{T1 - Temporary policy until January 15, 2027.}
_{T2 - Temporary policy until June 30, 2027.}
_{1 - Extension of visa-free stay is not possible.}
_{2 - May enter via Ninoy Aquino International Airport or Mactan–Cebu International Airport.}
_{3 - For Chinese citizens with People's Republic of China passports, Hong Kong Special Administrative Region passports or Macau Special Administrative Region passports only.}
_{4 - For tourist purposes only.}
_{5 - For permanent residents of Macau only.}
_{6 - For British Nationals (Overseas) only.}

Date of visa changes
- March 9, 1962: Germany
- August 30, 1962: Malaysia (as Federation of Malaya) and Thailand
- February 1, 1963: Bolivia
- January 1, 1966: Sweden
- January 1, 1967: Denmark and Norway
- January 1, 1970: Israel
- July 1, 1970: France
- April 1, 1971: Belgium, Luxembourg and Netherlands
- August 22, 1972: Brazil (replaced by another agreement from October 25, 1973)
- January 1, 1975: Iceland
- January 1, 1978: Austria
- May 13, 1994: Mongolia
- June 22, 1994: Macau
- July 12, 2005: Laos
- September 19, 2007: Russia
- April 15, 2014: Belize, Croatia, Kazakhstan, Kyrgyzstan, Tajikistan, Turkmenistan and Uzbekistan
- June 8, 2025: India
- July 1, 2025: Taiwan (effective until June 30, 2027)
- January 16, 2026: China (effective until January 15, 2027)

Cancelled:

- April 15, 2014: Somalia

==== Electronic Travel Authorization (ETA) ====
Citizens of the following countries and territories may apply for an Electronic Travel Authorization issued by Manila Economic and Cultural Office by paying NTD 1500 online. The validity of this multiple entry ETA allows visitors to stay in Philippines for no more than 30 days.

- Taiwan

==== Substitute visa ====
Citizens of China may enter the Philippines without a visa for tourist purposes for up to 7 days if they are holding a valid tourist, business or resident visa issued by any Schengen Area member state, Australia, Canada, Japan or the United States.

Citizens of India may enter the Philippines without a visa for tourist or business purposes for up to 30 days if they are holding a valid tourist, business or resident visa issued by any Schengen Area member state, Australia, Canada, Japan, Singapore, the United Kingdom or the United States, or a permanent residence permit issued by any Schengen Area member state, Australia, Canada, Japan, Singapore, the United Kingdom or the United States. They may enter from any port of entry.

=== Non-ordinary passports ===
In addition to countries whose citizens are visa-exempt, holders of diplomatic or official / service passports of the following countries may enter the Philippines without a visa:

- Albania^{D O S}
- Armenia^{D O S}
- Bangladesh^{D O S}
- Egypt^{D}
- Iran^{D O S}
- Jordan^{D O S}
- Pakistan^{D}
- Timor-Leste^{D O S}

_{D - Diplomatic passports}
_{O - Official passports}
_{S - Service passports}

In addition, holders of diplomatic or official / service passports of the following countries may enter the Philippines for a longer period of stay than holders to ordinary passports:

90 days

- Croatia
- Cuba
- Estonia
- Hungary
- Mexico
- Morocco
- Panama
- Peru
- Poland
- Romania
- Russia
- Slovenia

3 months

- Brazil
- Chile
- Germany
- Venezuela

59 days

- Argentina
- Austria
- Denmark
- Finland
- Italy
- Norway
- Slovakia
- Spain
- Sweden

2 months

- Tunisia

=== APEC Business Travel Card ===
Holders of passports issued by the following countries who possess an APEC Business Travel Card (ABTC) containing the "PHL" code on the reverse that it is valid for travel to Philippines may enter without a visa for business purposes for up to 59 days.

ABTCs are issued to citizens of:

- Australia
- Brunei
- Chile
- China
- Hong Kong
- Indonesia
- Japan
- South Korea
- Malaysia
- Mexico
- New Zealand
- Papua New Guinea
- Peru
- Russia
- Singapore
- Taiwan
- Thailand
- Vietnam

== Electronic visa (e-Visa) ==
Citizens of any country or territory may apply for an e-Visa, provided that they submit their application from one of the countries listed below where a Philippine Foreign Service Post is located and hold a valid permanent residence permit in that country (unless otherwise noted). They may obtain e-Visas for single-entry (valid for 3 months) or multiple-entry (valid for 6 months or 1 year) through the official Philippine e-Visa website. The cost of e-Visa (which include application and service fees) may vary, depending on the applicant's nationality and preferred e-Visa type. Holders of a valid e-Visa from these countries may stay in the Philippines for up to 59 days per visit.

- Afghanistan^{1}
- Albania^{1}
- Algeria^{1}
- Argentina
- Armenia^{1}
- Australia
- Austria
- Bangladesh
- Bahrain
- Belarus^{1}
- Belgium
- Bosnia and Herzegovina^{1}
- Brazil
- Cambodia
- Canada
- Chile
- Colombia
- Cuba^{1}
- Czech Republic
- Denmark
- Egypt
- Fiji
- Finland
- France
- Georgia^{1}
- Germany
- Greece
- Hungary
- India
- Indonesia
- Iran
- Ireland
- Israel
- Italy
- Japan
- Jordan
- Kenya
- Kuwait
- Laos
- Lebanon
- Libya
- Malaysia
- Mexico
- Moldova^{1}
- Montenegro^{1}
- Morocco
- Nauru^{1}
- Netherlands
- New Zealand
- Nigeria
- North Macedonia^{1}
- Norway
- Oman
- Pakistan
- Palestine^{1}
- Papua New Guinea
- Poland
- Qatar
- Romania
- Russia
- Saudi Arabia
- Serbia^{1}
- Sierra Leone^{1}
- Singapore
- Somalia^{1}
- South Africa
- South Korea
- South Sudan^{1}
- Spain
- Sudan^{1}
- Sweden
- Switzerland
- Thailand
- Timor-Leste
- Tonga^{1}
- Turkey
- Ukraine^{1}
- United Arab Emirates
- United States
- Vietnam
- Yemen^{1}

_{1 - There are no Philippine Service Foreign Post in these countries; thus, citizens who are permanently residing in these countries have the option to apply for an e-Visa. However, they must select the relevant country when applying for an e-Visa: Afghanistan: Pakistan; Albania: Italy; Algeria: Libya; Armenia, Belarus: Russia; Bosnia and Herzegovina, Montenegro, Serbia: Hungary; Cuba: Mexico; Georgia: Turkey; Moldova: Romania; Nauru, Tonga: Fiji; North Macedonia: Greece; Palestine: Jordan; Sierra Leone: Nigeria; Somalia, South Sudan: Kenya; Sudan: Egypt; Ukraine: Poland; Yemen: Saudi Arabia.}

However, citizens of the following countries residing in Mainland China, Hong Kong and Macau may obtain a tourist or business e-Visa for single entry via VFS Global website by paying CNY 380 application fee along with CNY 98 service fee since November 3, 2025. Visitors with a valid e-Visa may enter via Ninoy Aquino International Airport (in Manila) or Mactan–Cebu International Airport (in Cebu) and may stay in the Philippines for a maximum of 14 days.

- China

== Visa required in advance ==
Citizens of the following countries and territories must obtain a visa from a Philippine embassy or consulate:

- Azerbaijan
- Georgia
- Iraq
- Kosovo
- Lebanon
- North Korea
- Sri Lanka
- Syria

Citizens who require a visa may likewise apply for extensions of 1, 2 or 6 months, but their total period of stay may not exceed 24 months from the date of their most recent arrival.

== Visa types ==
The Philippine Immigration Act prescribes fourteen different visas grouped into two broad categories:

- Section 9 visas (non-immigrant visas), for temporary visits such as those for tourism, business, transit, study or employment
- Section 13 visas (immigrant visas), for foreign nationals who wish to become permanent residents in the Philippines

Some visas have been introduced by subsequent legislation or proclamation of the President which are not classified by the Philippine Immigration Act as either being a Section 9 or Section 13 visa. These visas are called special visas and are issued to groups such as retirees, investors and entrepreneurs.

=== List of visas ===
Visas in the Philippines
| Type | Visa | Description |
|---|---|---|
| Non-immigrant | 9(a) | Pleasure, business or health |
| Non-immigrant | 9(b) | Transit |
| Non-immigrant | 9(c) | Seaman on a ship docking in a port of entry in the Philippines |
| Non-immigrant | 9(d) | Alien businessman |
| Non-immigrant | 9(e) | Foreign government officials and their dependents, assistants and employees |
| Non-immigrant | 9(f) | Students |
| Non-immigrant | 9(g) | Pre-arranged employees and their dependents |
| Immigrant | 13 | Quota immigrants, of which no more than fifty of any one nationality or without nationality may be admitted within one calendar year. Immigrants who are issued Section 13 visas belonging to one of the seven listed sub-categories under CA 613 are considered non-quota immigrants, and may be admitted despite the quota. |
| Immigrant | 13(a) | The spouse or unmarried child (below 21) of a Filipino citizen. |
| Immigrant | 13(b) | Children born during a temporary visit abroad to mothers granted permanent residence in the Philippines. |
| Immigrant | 13(c) | Children born after the issuance of the visa of the accompanying parents. |
| Immigrant | 13(d) | Women who lost Filipino citizenship by virtue of marriage to a foreign spouse, and her unmarried children (below 21). (Note: Republic Act No. 8171, approved October 23, 1995, provided a mechanism allowing Filipino women who have lost their Philippine citizenship by marriage to aliens and natural-born Filipinos who have lost their Philippine citizenship, including their minor children, on account of political or economic necessity, to reacquire Philippine citizenship.) |
| Immigrant | 13(e) | Permanent residents returning to the Philippines from a temporary visit abroad to resume permanent residence. |
| Immigrant | 13(f) | The spouse and/or unmarried children (below 21) of an alien admitted to the Philippines for permanent residence prior to the approval of the Philippine Immigration Act. (Note: The Philippine Immigration Act stipulates that persons being admitted under this visa category must have been admitted within two years of the Act's approval.) |
| Immigrant | 13(g) | Natural-born Filipinos and their dependents who have naturalized in a foreign country and wish to permanently reside in the Philippines. This visa was provided for under Republic Act No. 4376, passed in 1965. (Note: Republic Act No. 9225, approved August 29, 2003, provided that all Philippine citizens who become citizens of another country shall be deemed not to have lost their Philippine citizenship. It further states that natural-born citizens of the Philippines who have lost their Philippine citizenship by reason of their naturalization as citizens of a foreign country are hereby deemed to have re-acquired Philippine citizenship upon taking an oath of allegiance to the Republic, and that their children whether legitimate, illegitimate or adopted, below eighteen (18) years of age, shall be deemed citizens of the Philippines.) |
| Special | 47(a)(2) | Special Non-Immigrant Visa. This is a non-immigrant visa granted to several categories of foreign nationals: Those employed as executives, supervisors, specialists, consultants, contractors or personal staff at enterprises registered with special economic zones, the Philippine Economic Zone Authority (PEZA), the Board of Investments (BOI), or the Authority of the Freeport Area of Bataan (AFAB); Those employed in enterprises that have existing agreement/s with the Philippine government or any of subdivisions and instrumentalities, including government-owned or controlled corporations, for the completion of a project; Exchange professors, scholars, trainees, participants, students, fellows and social workers under sponsorship of locally or internationally recognized educational, scientific, cultural, relief and charitable organizations, institutions, agencies or foundations, including representatives of non-recognized foreign governments to those organizations; Volunteers registered with the Philippine National Volunteer Service Coordinating Agency (PNVSCA), including foreign personnel of international rescue/aid organizations providing assistance on occasion of natural disasters and major emergencies; Dependents of any foreign national covered under the previous categories |
| Special | SIRV | Special Investor's Resident Visa. This is a non-immigrant visa granted to foreign nationals and their dependents who have shareholdings in Philippine corporations engaged in the manufacturing or services sectors, involved in projects listed under the Investment Priority Plan, or are listed on the Philippine Stock Exchange. This visa is issued by the BI in coordination with the Board of Investments. |
| Special | SVEG | Special Visa for Employment Generation. This is a non-immigrant visa granted to foreign nationals and their dependents who employ at least ten Filipinos in a lawful enterprise or business venture. |
| Special | SRRV | Special Resident Retiree's Visa. This is a non-immigrant visa granted to foreign nationals and their dependents who wish to retire in the Philippines. This visa is issued by the BI in coordination with the Philippine Retirement Authority. |
| Special | SNIV | Special Non-Immigrant Visa. This is a non-immigrant visa granted to foreign nationals and their dependents who are employed by the regional, area and/or regional operating headquarters of multinational corporations. |
| Special | SEVOBU | Special Employment Visa for Offshore Banking Unit. This is a non-immigrant visa granted to foreign nationals and their dependents who are employed by the Philippine offshore units of foreign banks. |

== History ==
The visa policy of the Philippines is governed by Commonwealth Act No. 613, also known as the Philippine Immigration Act, and by subsequent legislation amending it. The Act is jointly enforced by the Department of Foreign Affairs (DFA) and the Bureau of Immigration (BI).

The Philippine visa waiver program is governed by Executive Order No. 408, signed by President Carlos P. Garcia on November 9, 1960, and by subsequent executive issuances amending it. While visas are issued by the Bureau of Immigration, the program itself is administered by the Department of Foreign Affairs, which maintains a list of countries eligible to participate in the program.

In principle, nationals of countries which maintain diplomatic relations with the Philippines and whose nationals are not classified as restricted nationals by the DFA are allowed to enter the Philippines without a visa.

On July 1, 2013, the Bureau of Immigration began implementing an extended visa waiver for covered nationals from 21 to 30 days, which the Philippine government hoped would boost tourism

In March 2015, it was proposed to extend the visa exemption to citizens of China and India.

On May 19, 2025, the Department of Foreign Affairs announced the Philippines' new visa exemption policies for Indian nationals, which will grant 14 days visa-free entry for all Indian tourists and an enhanced 30 days conditional visa-free entry for Indian tourists with valid visas or permanent residencies from select countries. The new visa exemption rules took effect on June 8, 2025, following the official announcement from the Philippine Embassy in India on June 7, 2025.

On July 1, 2025, the Philippines introduced visa exemption policy for Taiwanese nationals traveling to the country for a short term touristic visit, following the announcement from Manila Economic and Cultural Office on June 19, 2025.

== Visitor statistics ==
| Country | Aug 2026 | 2025 | 2024 | 2023 | 2022 | 2021 | 2020 | 2019 | 2018 | 2017 | 2016 | 2015 | 2014 | 2013 | 2012 | 2011 | 2010 |
|---|---|---|---|---|---|---|---|---|---|---|---|---|---|---|---|---|---|
| United States | 926,575 | 1,323,142 | 1,239,674 | 1,107,787 | 505,089 | 49,117 | 235,440 | 1,108,862 | 1,068,161 | 1,007,081 | 937,384 | 852,010 | 794,539 | 745,180 | 730,036 | 703,534 | 694,780 |
| South Korea | 744,732 | 1,346,301 | 1,651,779 | 1,470,259 | 428,014 | 6,575 | 339,702 | 1,989,661 | 1,625,829 | 1,609,884 | 1,475,292 | 1,339,936 | 1,175,717 | 1,165,881 | 1,031,178 | 925,225 | 740,629 |
| Japan | 321,545 | 502,546 | 444,258 | 310,790 | 99,557 | 15,362 | 140,872 | 684,303 | 637,666 | 609,456 | 571,266 | 537,697 | 504,378 | 472,116 | 449,802 | 408,225 | 388,872 |
| China | 303,567 | 267,660 | 313,856 | 263,836 | 39,627 | 9,817 | 170,994 | 1,743,605 | 1,258,832 | 968,897 | 675,676 | 490,856 | 394,967 | 426,369 | 250,904 | 243,155 | 187,453 |
| Canada | 237,989 | 333,136 | 283,080 | 261,710 | 121,413 | 8,348 | 60,697 | 246,480 | 236,337 | 219,229 | 199,583 | 182,922 | 169,807 | 155,984 | 145,819 | 135,262 | 123,521 |
| Australia | 237,849 | 359,646 | 317,003 | 287,392 | 137,974 | 2,429 | 57,952 | 291,616 | 284,523 | 265,635 | 259,942 | 250,845 | 234,188 | 221,837 | 199,071 | 177,749 | 153,974 |
| Taiwan | 153,700 | 213,928 | 213,833 | 194,851 | 23,604 | 1,749 | 50,493 | 327,454 | 242,633 | 236,846 | 229,306 | 177,677 | 142,981 | 139,108 | 216,528 | 181,738 | 142,460 |
| United Kingdom | 151,574 | 229,941 | 211,414 | 187,784 | 101,052 | 4,625 | 41,254 | 212,080 | 203,493 | 189,140 | 182,717 | 165,189 | 144,102 | 133,159 | 125,472 | 116,532 | 111,059 |
| India | 82,692 | 104,994 | 79,366 | 70,286 | 51,542 | 7,207 | 29,141 | 134,996 | 121,153 | 107,288 | 90,820 | 74,824 | 61,153 | 52,206 | 46,398 | 42,849 | 34,582 |
| Singapore* | 74,704 | 115,341 | 115,906 | 104,346 | 53,448 | 774 | 23,059 | 159,141 | 172,538 | 169,051 | 176,181 | 181,313 | 179,175 | 175,147 | 148,305 | 137,846 | 121,113 |
| Malaysia* | 73,754 | 104,989 | 102,502 | 102,774 | 46,805 | 1,627 | 24,645 | 139,982 | 145,390 | 143,566 | 139,143 | 155,830 | 139,258 | 109,458 | 114,525 | 91,757 | 79,699 |
| France | 72,279 | 78,823 | 67,082 | 51,601 | 23,949 | 1,425 | 24,530 | 88,577 | 74,400 | 64,777 | 55,384 | 45,505 | 48,644 | 38,946 | 39,042 | 33,709 | 31,359 |
| Germany | 70,750 | 108,569 | 100,322 | 85,233 | 39,013 | 2,152 | 26,261 | 104,410 | 93,257 | 87,434 | 89,259 | 78,448 | 75,883 | 73,955 | 70,488 | 64,480 | 62,347 |
| Spain | 39,400 | 65,828 | 61,691 | 44,901 | 19,194 | 1,273 | 9,995 | 50,206 | 44,662 | 39,325 | 35,409 | 27,830 | 22,983 | 20,832 | 20,354 | 18,722 | 17,243 |
| Italy | 37,944 | 56,119 | 45,571 | 34,157 | 12,933 | 1,357 | 9,961 | 39,498 | 36,825 | 44,755 | 45,904 | 44,910 | 42,603 | 40,278 | 44,038 | 44,043 | 47,577 |
| Indonesia* | 37,886 | 49,903 | 57,864 | 53,707 | 24,596 | 1,934 | 14,568 | 70,892 | 76,734 | 62,945 | 45,904 | 48,181 | 46,759 | 45,585 | 36,631 | 34,544 | 31,997 |
| Russia | 33,664 | 44,007 | 37,341 | 29,779 | 8,040 | 1,036 | 12,683 | 36,125 | 29,974 | 33,285 | 28,215 | 25,285 | 32,092 | 35,415 | 28,280 | 20,190 | 14,645 |
| Netherlands | 32,971 | 49,646 | 44,379 | 37,622 | 19,306 | 1,554 | 9,164 | 41,510 | 37,322 | 34,216 | 32,336 | 29,096 | 25,761 | 23,108 | 22,709 | 21,521 | 19,875 |
| New Zealand | 32,398 | 50,603 | 45,030 | 41,814 | 17,503 | 392 | 7,508 | 38,847 | 34,319 | 31,198 | 26,473 | 24,016 | 21,056 | 18,774 | 17,270 | 15,355 | 13,674 |
| Vietnam* | 31,605 | 33,599 | 51,396 | 59,354 | 38,605 | 1,811 | 12,013 | 66,713 | 52,364 | 39,959 | 33,899 | 31,584 | 29,803 | 26,602 | 20,818 | 17,782 | 17,311 |
| Thailand* | 25,881 | 49,650 | 47,675 | 40,952 | 16,300 | 1,501 | 10,955 | 61,343 | 59,873 | 48,752 | 47,928 | 44,056 | 45,960 | 47,893 | 40,997 | 37,877 | 36,718 |
| Israel | 22,029 | 28,399 | 18,929 | 15,139 | 9,711 | 460 | 4,860 | 22,875 | 20,362 | 17,458 | 16,728 | 11,760 | 8,779 | 7,676 | 5,899 | 4,990 | 4,527 |
| Switzerland | 19,767 | 31,769 | 30,813 | 24,048 | 11,092 | 628 | 7,266 | 30,207 | 31,518 | 30,775 | 30,881 | 28,784 | 27,031 | 26,441 | 25,295 | 24,033 | 23,177 |
| Poland | 17,260 | 28,388 | 21,159 | 13,829 | 4,222 | 528 | 5,445 | 15,828 | 12,607 | 10,836 | 8,933 | 8,082 | 5,954 | 5,669 | 4,206 | 3,267 | 2,926 |
| Hong Kong SAR | 14,074 | 96,679 | 98,073 | 80,512 | 8,589 | 354 | 12,444 | 91,653 | 117,992 | 111,135 | 116,328 | 122,180 | 114,100 | 126,008 | 118,666 | 112,106 | 133,746 |
| Myanmar* | 6,863 | 5,577 | 11,035 | 6,873 | 4,255 | 274 | 2,909 | 13,980 | 9,364 | 9,573 | 7,442 | 7,033 | 6,633 | 4,948 | 4,291 | 3,246 | 3,983 |
| Cambodia* | 3,204 | 4,268 | 3,999 | 3,665 | 1,454 | 59 | 1,010 | 5,992 | 4,712 | 4,715 | 3,527 | 3,503 | 3,278 | 3,230 | 2,662 | 2,469 | 2,244 |
| Brunei* | 3,123 | 5,853 | 6,578 | 6,639 | 1,884 | 66 | 1,389 | 8,160 | 9,564 | 8,965 | 8,213 | 9,015 | 9,678 | 8,299 | 5,994 | 5,248 | 4,072 |
| United Arab Emirates | 1,814 | 3,320 | 3,471 | 3,288 | 2,084 | 3,889 | 12,667 | 10,473 | 15,772 | 16,520 | 17,640 | 16,888 | 17,007 | 15,169 | 12,695 | 13,413 | 12,742 |
| Total | 4,415,860 | 6,484,060 | 6,435,438 | 5,663,166 | 2,653,858 | 163,879 | 1,482,535 | 8,260,913 | 7,168,467 | 6,620,908 | 5,967,005 | 5,360,682 | 4,833,368 | 4,681,307 | 4,272,811 | 3,917,454 | 3,520,471 |

* Country in ASEAN

== See also ==
- Visa requirements for Philippine citizens
- Philippine passport
- Immigration to the Philippines
