= Visa requirements for Philippine citizens =

Administrative entry restrictions

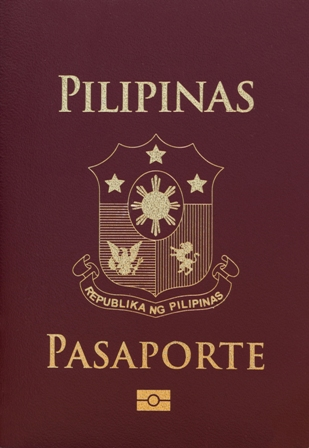
Front cover of a Philippine passport.

Visa requirements for Filipino citizens are administrative entry restrictions imposed on citizens of the Philippines by the authorities of other territories.

As of July 2026, Filipino citizens have visa-free or visa on arrival access to 66 countries and territories, ranking the Philippine passport 72nd in the world according to the Henley Passport Index.

== Visa requirements map ==
Visa requirements for Filipino citizens holding ordinary passports Philippines Visa not required Visa on arrival eVisa Visa available both on arrival or online Visa required

== Visa requirements ==
Country	Visa requirement	Allowed stay	Notes (excluding departure fees)
Afghanistan	eVisa	30 days	Women of all nationalities must cover their body with clothing, except for their face, hands and feet.; Visa is not required in case born in Afghanistan or can proof that one of their parents is a national of Afghanistan or born in Afghanistan.; e-Visa : Visitors must arrive at Kabul International (KBL).
Albania	eVisa	90 days	Filipinos may travel to Albania without a visa if they are: residing permanently in Schengen countries, the United Kingdom or the United States.; holding a valid multiple-entry Schengen visa, which has been used to enter one of the Schengen countries.; holding a valid multiple-entry visa issued by the United Kingdom or the United States, which has been used to enter the respective countries.
Algeria	Visa required		Persons may be denied entry if entering with a passport containing visas or stamps issued by Israel.; Visitors on tours organized to some southern regions by an approved travel agency may obtain a visa on arrival for up to 30 days.
Andorra	Visa required		There are no visa requirements for entry into Andorra, but it can only be accessed by passing through France or Spain. A multiple entry visa is required to re-enter either France or Spain when leaving Andorra.; All visitors can stay for 3 months.
Angola	Visa not required	30 days	
Antigua and Barbuda	eVisa		Visa on arrival for Filipinos with valid visa or resident card from Canada, the United Kingdom, and the United States, or a Schengen visa.
Argentina	Visa required		Those with valid B2 or B1 / B2 visa issued by the U.S. are eligible to apply for Electronic Travel Authorization (eTA) prior to arrival (eTA fee is US$50 and processing time is 20 working days).
Armenia	eVisa	120 days	Visa on arrival for holders of valid sticker visa or resident card issued by Australia, Canada, GCC countries, Japan, New Zealand, Russia, South Korea, EU or Schengen Area member states, United Kingdom or United States.
Australia	Visa required		May apply online (Online Visitor e600 visa).; Transit visa is not required.
Austria	Visa required		
Azerbaijan	Visa required		Visa on arrival for Filipinos residing in the United Arab Emirates. Valid UAE residence visa along with the passport or travel document must be presented.
Bahamas	eVisa	3 months	Permanent Residents of Canada and the United States do not need a visa and may stay up to 30 days.
Bahrain	eVisa / Visa on arrival	14 days	Filipinos with existing Saudi Iqama (valid for at least 3 months) and Saudi Exit-ReEntry visa can enter Bahrain visa-free via King Fahad Causeway Bridge.; Valid visit visa to UAE, UK, USA, KSA (excluding Hajj & Umrah visa), Schengen or USA Green Card.
Bangladesh	Visa required		
Barbados	Visa not required	90 days	
Belarus	Visa required		
Belgium	Visa required		
Belize	Visa required		As of 2018, individuals with valid U.S. or Schengen Treaty Visas in their passports, as well as individuals with valid U.S. and Canada residency, do not require a visa to travel to Belize.
Benin	Visa not required	30 days	
Bhutan	eVisa	90 days	The Sustainable Development Fee (SDF) of 200 USD per person, per night for almost all visitors to Bhutan. Additionally, if payment is made in US dollars from September 1, 2023 to August 31, 2027, the SDF is 100 USD.
Bolivia	Visa not required	90 days	
Bosnia and Herzegovina	Visa required		Visa-free for up to 30 days for valid UK or Schengen or US visa holders used or unused.
Botswana	eVisa	3 months	
Brazil	Visa not required	90 days	
Brunei	Visa not required	14 days	
Bulgaria	Visa required		
Burkina Faso	eVisa		
Burundi	Online Visa / Visa on arrival	1 month	
Cambodia	Visa not required	30 days	
Cameroon	eVisa		
Canada	Visa required		Holders of 'Green cards' issued by the U.S. do not need a visa to visit or transit Canada, unless deemed inadmissible. Holders of B or C visas issued in Switzerland do not require transit visas when flying with Air Canada via the U.S.; Filipinos who have held a Canadian visa in the last 10 years^{1} or who hold a valid US non-immigrant visa can obtain an eTA instead of a visa when traveling to Canada by air^{2}.; 1 - It doesn't matter if it was expired and/or never used.; 2 - Entry by land and sea still requires visa.
Cape Verde	Visa required		
Central African Republic	Visa required		
Chad	eVisa		
Chile	Visa required		
China	Visa required		Filipino citizens may travel without a visa to Hainan.; Visa on arrival for Shenzhen, provided that they have a previously issued Chinese visa, whether valid or expired.; 24-hour visa-free transit through any international airports of China, allows domestic travel through different airports. (Note: Custom procedure for 24-hour visa-free transit is required in principle, except in Beijing (both Capital and Daxing), Shanghai Pudong, Hangzhou, Xiamen, Guangzhou, Shenzhen, Chengdu Tianfu and Xi'an if no leaving of international transit areas.)
Colombia	Visa not required	90 days	90 days on arrival, can extend another 90 days for 180 days total.
Comoros	Visa on arrival	45 days	
Republic of the Congo	Visa required		
Democratic Republic of the Congo	eVisa	7 days	
Costa Rica	Visa not required	90 days	30 days upon arrival, can extend for total of 90 days.
Côte d'Ivoire	Visa not required	90 days	
Croatia	Visa required		Visa-free for a maximum stay of 90 days for valid visa holders or residents of the Schengen member states.
Cuba	eVisa	90 days	
Cyprus	Visa required		
Czech Republic	Visa required		
Denmark	Visa required		
Djibouti	eVisa	90 days	
Dominica	Visa not required	21 days	
Dominican Republic	Visa required		Residents of the United States, Canada, and the European Union (including the United Kingdom) do not need a visa to visit the Dominican Republic for tourist purposes and can enter the Dominican Republic with a Tourist Card and a valid passport. They may stay up to 30 days.
Ecuador	Online Visa		
Egypt	Visa required		Visa on arrival with a valid Schengen visa or residence permit.; The passport must be valid for at least 6 months beyond the return date.
El Salvador	Visa required		Visa is not required for a maximum stay of 90 days within 180 days for valid visa holders or residents of Canada, the European Union member states, or the United States.
Equatorial Guinea	eVisa		
Eritrea	Visa required		
Estonia	Visa required		
Eswatini	Visa required		
Ethiopia	eVisa / Visa on arrival	90 days	Visa on arrival is obtainable only at Addis Ababa Bole International Airport.; e-Visa holders must arrive via Addis Ababa Bole International Airport.; e-Visa is available for 30 or 90 days.
Fiji	Visa not required	4 months	
Finland	Visa required		
France	Visa required		Transit through a French airport also requires a transit visa
Gabon	eVisa	90 days	e-Visa holders must arrive via Libreville International Airport.
Gambia	Visa required		Must obtain an entry clearance from the Gambian Immigration prior to travel.
Georgia	eVisa	30 days	According to the Resolution of the Government of Georgia No. 256 dated June 5, 2015, the following countries whose visas and / or residence permits for foreigners can enter Georgia without a visa for the appropriate period and conditions: Australia, Austria, Bahrain, Belgium, Bulgaria, Canada, Croatia, Cyprus, Czech Republic, Denmark, Territories of the Kingdom of Denmark - the Faroe Islands and Greenland, Estonia, France, Territories of the French Republic - French Polynesia and New Caledonia, Finland, Germany, Greece, Hungary, Iceland, Ireland, Israel, Italy, Japan, Kuwait, Latvia, Lithuania, Liechtenstein, Luxembourg, Malta, Netherlands, Territories of the Kingdom of the Netherlands - Aruba and the Antilles of the Netherlands, New Zealand, Norway, Oman, Poland, Portugal, Qatar, Romania, Saudi Arabia, Slovakia, Slovenia, South Korea, Spain, Sweden, Switzerland, United Arab Emirates, United Kingdom, Foreign Territories of the United Kingdom of Great Britain and Northern Ireland - Bermuda, Cayman Islands, British Virgin Islands, Falkland Islands, Turks and Caicos Islands, Gibraltar, Dependent territories of the United Kingdom of Great Britain and Northern Ireland - Jersey, Guernsey, the Isle of Man, United States of America. Foreigners who have a visa and / or residence permit of any of the countries mentioned may enter Georgia without a visa and stay for any 180-day period for a period of 90 calendar days. In order to enter and stay in Georgia without a visa, the visa and / or residence permit of the respective country must be valid for the day of entry into Georgia (crossing the border), which must be confirmed by a travel and / or other relevant document.; No visa required for visit as a tourist if a valid original resident permit card from any GCC States if presented with Official English Translation (if the card has NO English Translation) and a Travel Insurance.
Germany	Visa required		
Ghana	Visa required		
Greece	Visa required		
Grenada	Visa required		
Guatemala	Visa required		Visa is not required for a maximum stay of 90 days within 180 days for valid visa holders or residents of Canada, the European Union member states, or the United States.
Guinea	eVisa	90 days	
Guinea-Bissau	Visa on arrival	90 days	
Guyana	Visa required		
Haiti	Visa not required	3 months	
Honduras	Visa required		Visa is not required for a maximum stay of 90 days within 180 days for valid visa holders or residents of Canada, the European Union member states, or the United States.
Hungary	Visa required		
Iceland	Visa required		
India	eVisa	30 days	e-Visa holders must arrive via 32 designated airports (Note: Ahmedabad; Amritsar; Bagdogra; Bengaluru; Bhubaneswar; Chandigarh; Chennai; Coimbatore; Delhi; Gaya; Goa-Dabolim; Goa-Manohar; Guwahati; Hyderabad; Indore; Jaipur; Kannur; Kochi; Kolkata; Kozhikode; Lucknow; Madurai; Mangaluru; Mumbai; Nagpur; Port Blair; Pune; Surat; Thiruvananthapuram; Tiruchirappalli; Varanasi; Visakhapatnam) or 5 designated seaports. (Note: Chennai; Cochin; Mormugao (Goa); Mumbai; Mangalore); An Indian e-Tourist Visa may only be obtained twice within 1 calendar year.; Foreigners of Pakistani origin or who hold a Pakistani Passport are not eligible for an e-Visa. Foreigners who are not Pakistani nationals, but whose parents or grandparents (either paternal or maternal) were born in, or were permanent residents in Pakistan, are also not eligible for an e-Visa.; Indian e-Tourist Visas are to be issued free of charge for Filipinos, as announced in August 2025.
Indonesia	Visa not required	30 days	
Iran	eVisa	30 days	
Iraq	eVisa	30 days	
Ireland	Visa required		Filipinos who have an eligible/valid UK (short stay) visitor visa may be able to visit Ireland without applying for a separate Irish visa under the Short Stay Visa Waiver Programme.
Israel	Electronic Travel Authorization	3 months	
Italy	Visa required		
Jamaica	Visa required		Permanent Residents of Canada do not require a visa.
Japan	Visa required		Residents of Australia, Brazil, Cambodia, Canada, Saudi Arabia, Singapore, South Africa, Taiwan, United Kingdom and United States of America are eligible to apply for a single entry eVisa for 90 days.
Jordan	Visa required		
Kazakhstan	Visa not required	30 days	
Kenya	Electronic Travel Authorisation	90 days	Applications can be submitted up to 90 days prior to travel and must be submitted at least 3 days in advance.; eTA fee is 32.50 USD.; Proof of reservation at the hotel where visitors plan to stay is required (if staying with friends, an invitation letter is also acceptable).; Yellow fever vaccination certificate is required if coming from endemic countries.
Kiribati	Visa not required	90 days	90 days within any 12-month period.
North Korea	Visa required		No independent moving allowed - all tourists have a minder and itinerary is set by them, as agents of one the several government entities responsible for Tourism in North Korea.
South Korea	Visa required		Visa-free transit (up to 30 days) provided holding a valid U.S., Canada, Australia, New Zealand visa, and arriving from or departing to those countries.; Visa-free access for 30 days to Jeju Island.; Group tourists are allowed visa-free travel if coming in through Yangyang International Airport until June 30, 2026. Stay is limited to 15 days & movement only to around Gangwon-do region and Seoul metropolitan area.
Kuwait	Visa required		
Kyrgyzstan	eVisa / Visa on arrival	60 days	Visa on arrival available at Manas International Airport.; e-Visa holders must arrive via Manas International Airport or Osh Airport or through land crossings with China (at Irkeshtam and Torugart), Kazakhstan (at Ak-jol, Ak-Tilek, Chaldybar, Chon-Kapka), Tajikistan (at Bor-Dobo, Kulundu, Kyzyl-Bel) and Uzbekistan (at Dostuk).
Laos	Visa not required	30 days	
Latvia	Visa required		
Lebanon	Visa required		In addition to a visa, an approval should be obtained from the immigration department of the General Directorate of General Security (La Sûreté Générale).
Lesotho	Visa required		The e-visa website exists, but the visa issuance function is currently suspended.
Liberia	e-VOA	3 months	
Libya	eVisa		
Liechtenstein	Visa required		
Lithuania	Visa required		
Luxembourg	Visa required		
Madagascar	eVisa / Visa on arrival	90 days	For stays of 61 to 90 days, the visa fee is 59 USD.
Malawi	Visa not required	90 days	
Malaysia	Visa not required	30 days	
Maldives	Free visa on arrival	30 days	
Mali	Visa required		
Malta	Visa required		
Marshall Islands	Visa on arrival	90 days	
Mauritania	eVisa	30 days	Available at Nouakchott–Oumtounsy International Airport.
Mauritius	Visa on arrival	60 days	
Mexico	Visa required		Filipinos holding a permanent resident permit or a valid multiple-entry visa issued by the Schengen member countries, Canada, Japan, the United Kingdom and the United States can travel to Mexico without a visa.
Micronesia	Visa not required	30 days	
Moldova	eVisa	90 days	Filipinos who are permanent residents of Canada can stay up to 90 days.
Monaco	Visa required		
Mongolia	Visa not required	21 days	
Montenegro	Visa required		According to the Article 7 para 1 of the Regulation on Visa Regime Published on: May 13, 2021 9:07 AM of Montenegro, “holders of valid foreign travel documents containing a valid Schengen visa, a valid visa of Commonwealth of Australia, the Republic of Bulgaria, the Republic of Croatia, Japan, Canada, New Zealand, Ireland, Romania, the United States of America and the United Kingdom of Great Britain and Northern Ireland may enter, pass through the territory and stay in Montenegro up to 30 days, and not longer than the expiry of visa if the period of validity of the visa is less than 30 days.”
Morocco	Visa not required	90 days	
Mozambique	eVisa / Visa on arrival	30 days	
Myanmar	Visa not required	14 days	Also e-Visa available for 28 days.; Holders must arrive via Yangon, Nay Pyi Taw or Mandalay airports.
Namibia	eVisa	3 months	
Nauru	Visa required		
Nepal	Online Visa / Visa on arrival	90 days	
Netherlands	Visa required		
New Zealand	Visa required		May transit without visa if transit is through Auckland Airport and for no longer than 24 hours, subject to meeting character requirements and obtaining an Electronic Travel Authority prior to departure.; Holders of an Australian Permanent Resident Visa or Resident Return Visa may be granted a New Zealand Resident Visa on arrival permitting indefinite stay (pursuant to the Trans-Tasman Travel Arrangement), subject to meeting character requirements and obtaining an Electronic Travel Authority prior to departure.
Nicaragua	Visa not required	90 days	
Niger	Visa required		
Nigeria	eVisa	30 days	
North Macedonia	Visa required		Those with a valid Canadian, UK or U.S. visa with a validity date at least 5 days beyond the intended period of stay in the Republic of Macedonia can stay for up to 15 days at any given entry on the territory of the Republic of Macedonia while the total duration of consecutive stays in the Republic of Macedonia must not exceed 3 months in any six-month period calculated from the day of first entry.; Travelers can enter the country with a valid Schengen visa.
Norway	Visa required		
Oman	Visa not required / eVisa	14 days / 30 days	
Pakistan	eVisa	3 months	
Palau	Free visa on arrival	30 days	
Panama	Visa required		Filipinos who hold a valid visa issued by the United States, the United Kingdom, Canada, Australia, Japan, the European Union, Singapore, or South Korea can travel to Panama visa-free for stays of up to 30 days.
Papua New Guinea	eVisa	60 days	Available at Gurney Airport (Alotau), Mount Hagen Airport, Port Moresby Airport and Tokua Airport (Rabaul).
Paraguay	Visa not required	30 days	
Peru	Visa not required	90 days	
Poland	Visa required		
Portugal	Visa required		
Qatar	eVisa		
Romania	Visa required		
Russia	eVisa	30 days	
Rwanda	Visa not required	90 days	
Saint Kitts and Nevis	eVisa	30 days	
Saint Lucia	Visa on arrival	6 weeks	
Saint Vincent and the Grenadines	Visa not required	3 months	
Samoa	Entry permit on arrival	90 days	
San Marino	Visa required		
São Tomé and Príncipe	eVisa		
Saudi Arabia	Visa required		Philippine passport holders with already used but still valid US, UK, Schengen visas can avail visa-on-arrival at any port of entry in Saudi Arabia.
Senegal	Visa on arrival	1 month	
Serbia	Visa required		Visa-free for a maximum stay of 90 days for valid visa holders or residents of the European Union member states, Switzerland and the United States.; Travelers can enter the country with a valid Schengen visa.
Seychelles	Electronic Border System	3 months	Application can be submitted up to 30 days before travel.; Visitors must upload a reservation confirmation(s) for each visitor's location of stay in Seychelles.; Yellow fever vaccination certificate is required if coming from endemic countries.; Payment of the fee (EUR 10) by credit or debit card.; Valid for one journey only and it expires once exit the country.
Sierra Leone	eVisa	3 months	
Singapore	Visa not required	30 days	
Slovakia	Visa required		
Slovenia	Visa required		
Solomon Islands	Visa required		
Somalia	eVisa	30 days	All visitors must have an approved Electronic Visa (eTAS) before the start of their journey.
South Africa	eVisa		e-Visa holders must arrive via O. R. Tambo International Airport.
South Sudan	eVisa		Obtainable online 30 days single entry for 100 USD, 90 days multiple entry for 200 USD and 180 days multiple entry for 350 USD.; Printed visa authorization must be presented at the time of travel.
Spain	Visa required		
Sri Lanka	ETA / Visa on arrival	30 days	
Sudan	Visa required		
Suriname	Visa not required	90 days	An entrance fee of USD 50 or EUR 50 must be paid online prior to arrival.; Multiple entry e-Visa is also available.
Sweden	Visa required		
Switzerland	Visa required		
Syria	eVisa		
Tajikistan	Visa not required	30 days	
Tanzania	eVisa / Visa on arrival	90 days	
Thailand	Visa not required	60 days	Maximum 2 visits annually if not arriving by air.
Timor-Leste	Visa on arrival	30 days	
Togo	eVisa	15 days	
Tonga	Visa required		
Trinidad and Tobago	eVisa	90 days	
Tunisia	Visa required		
Turkey	Visa required		e-Visa for a maximum stay of 30 days available for valid visa or valid residence permit holders from one of the Schengen Countries, USA, UK or Ireland.
Turkmenistan	Visa required		10-day visa on arrival if holding a letter of invitation provided by a company registered in Turkmenistan with a prior approval from the Foreign Ministry. Visitors can apply to extend their stay for an additional 10 days.; When transiting between two non-bordering countries, visitors can obtain a Turkmenistan transit visa for a five-day stay. This must be applied for in advance at the Turkmenistan Embassy. Visitors must also submit copies of the visas for the country of entry into Turkmenistan and the country of departure from Turkmenistan. Visa fee is 20 USD.
Tuvalu	Visa on arrival	1 month	
Uganda	eVisa	3 months	
Ukraine	eVisa		Ukraine reintroduces e-Visa system for travelers from 17 February 2025.; Visas are valid for tourism and business purposes for 30 days. From January 1, 2019, electronic visas will also be available for the following purposes: treatment, activities in the field of culture, science, education, sports, in order to perform official duties of a foreign correspondent or representative of a foreign media. Starting November 1, 2020, visa cost will be reduced to 20 USD for visa with single entry and 30 USD for double-entry visa with decision within 3 business days. Urgent visa processing will be available for double visa fee (40/60 USD) and decision within 1 business day.
United Arab Emirates	Visa required		May apply using 'Smart service'.; Visa on arrival for those possessing a valid visa, residence permit, or Green Card issued by any of the following countries: United States of America, European Union member states, Australia, Japan, Singapore, Republic of Korea, Canada, and New Zealand. 14 days option (100 AED) with optional 14 days extension (250 AED), or 60 days non-extendable option (250 AED) are available for eligible travelers.
United Kingdom	Visa required		
United States	Visa required		
Uruguay	Visa required		
Uzbekistan	eVisa	30 days	5-day visa-free transit at the international airports if holding a confirmed onward ticket for a flight to a third country.
Vanuatu	Visa not required	120 days	
Vatican City	Visa required		
Venezuela	eVisa		Introduction of Electronic Visa System for Tourist and Business Travelers.
Vietnam	Visa not required	21 days	A single entry e-Visa valid for 30 days is also available.
Yemen	Visa required		Yemen introduced an e-Visa system for visitors who meet certain eligibility requirements (group travel of 10 or more people, business trips, and transit etc.).
Zambia	eVisa	90 days	
Zimbabwe	eVisa	1 month	

Certain countries allow Filipino citizens to enter without a visa if they are in a possession of a valid visa or resident permit for Canada, Ireland, the Schengen area, the United States or the United Kingdom.

=== Territories and disputed areas ===
Visa requirements for Filipino citizens for entry to various territories, disputed areas, partially recognized countries and restricted zones:

Visitor to	Visa requirement	Notes (excluding departure fees)
Africa
British Indian Ocean Territory	Special permit required	Special permit required.
Eritrea outside Asmara	Travel permit required	To travel in the rest of the country, a Travel Permit for foreign visitors is required (20 Eritrean nakfa).
Mayotte	Visa required	
Réunion	Visa required	
Ascension Island	eVisa	3 months within any year period.
Saint Helena	eVisa	
Tristan da Cunha	Permission required	Permission to land required for 15/30 pounds sterling (yacht/ship passenger) for Tristan da Cunha Island or 20 pounds sterling for Gough Island, Inaccessible Island or Nightingale Islands.
Sahrawi Arab Democratic Republic	Visa regime undefined	Undefined visa regime in the Western Sahara controlled territory.
Somaliland	Visa required	30 days for 30 USD, payable on arrival.
Sudan	Travel permit required	All foreign visitors traveling more than 25 kilometers outside of Khartoum must obtain a travel permit.
(Sudan) Darfur	Travel permit required	Separate travel permit is required.
Asia
(China) Hainan	Visa not required	Visa not required for 30 days for traveling
Hong Kong	Visa not required	14 days
India PAP/RAP	PAP/RAP required	Protected Area Permit (PAP) required for all of Arunachal Pradesh, Manipur, Mizoram and parts of Himachal Pradesh, Jammu and Kashmir and Uttarakhand. Restricted Area Permit (RAP) required for all of Andaman and Nicobar Islands and Lakshadweep and parts of Sikkim. Some of these requirements are occasionally lifted for a year.
Kazakhstan	Special permission required	Special permission required for the town of Baikonur and surrounding areas in Kyzylorda Oblast, and the town of Gvardeyskiy near Almaty.
(Iran) Kish Island	Visa not required	Visitors to Kish Island do not require a visa.; May stay up to 14 days.
Macao	Visa not required	30 days
Maldives	Permission required	With the exception of the capital Malé, tourists are generally prohibited from visiting non-resort islands without the express permission of the Government of Maldives.
North Korea outside Pyongyang	Special permit required	People are not allowed to leave the capital city, tourists can only leave the capital with a governmental tourist guide (no independent moving)
Palestine	Visa not required	Arrival by sea to Gaza Strip not allowed.
Taiwan	Visa not required	14 days. Starting from November 1, 2017, to July 31, 2022, and again from September 29, 2022, to July 31, 2026, and again until July 31, 2027.
(Tajikistan) Gorno-Badakhshan Autonomous Province	OIVR permit required	OIVR permit required (15+5 Tajikistani Somoni) and another special permit (free of charge) is required for Lake Sarez.
(United Nations) Korean Demilitarized Zone	Access restricted	Restricted zone.
(United Nations) UNDOF Zone and Ghajar	Access restricted	Restricted zone.
Yemen	Special permission required	Special permission needed for travel outside Sanaa or Aden.
Caribbean and North Atlantic
Anguilla	Visa required	
Aruba	Visa required	Visa-free if U.S., UK, Canada or Schengen Area resident permit holder or cruise ship passenger staying not more than 48 hours
Bermuda	Visa not required (conditional)	Only if transiting through the United Kingdom or holding a valid visa or resident permit issued by the United States, Canada or the United Kingdom.
(Netherlands) Bonaire, St. Eustatius and Saba	Visa required	Visa-free if U.S., UK, Canada or Schengen Area resident permit holder or cruise ship passenger staying not more than 48 hours
British Virgin Islands	Visa required	Permanent residents of the United States, Canada or the United Kingdom do not require a visa.
Cayman Islands	Visa required	Up to 30 days visa-free for permanent residents of and traveling directly from: Canada, USA or UK. Visa-free for cruise ship passengers leaving on same day as arrival.
Curaçao	Visa required	Visa-free if U.S., UK, Canada or Schengen Area resident permit holder or cruise ship passenger staying not more than 48 hours
(France) French Guiana	Visa required	Visa is not required if you are: In possession of a long-stay visa or hold a valid residence permit issued by a Schengen member state.; Holding a residence permit for Andorra or Monaco.; A flight crew in the performance of your duties, to travel only in the airport or surrounding areas for the duration of the stopover.; A seafarer, holding a "seaman's book" recognised by the French authorities, in order to go ashore in the authorised area for the duration of the stopover. (By authorised area, we mean the port area, the commune of the port of call, the neighbouring communes as defined by the Prefect or the State Representative for certain overseas territories), A passenger of a vessel who will remain on board during the stop.; A passenger on a cruise ship and you plan to enter and stay during the period of the stopover, and you hold a valid residence permit issued by a Member State of the European Union, the European Economic Area or Switzerland, or issued by Andorra, Monaco, San Marino, Canada, Japan or the United States of America authorising readmission to these States, or if you hold a valid visa issued by a French authority for another part of the territory of France.
(France) French West Indies	Visa required	French West Indies refers to Martinique, Guadeloupe, Saint Martin and Saint Barthélemy. Visa is not required if you are: In possession of a long-stay visa or hold a valid residence permit issued by a Schengen member state; Holding a residence permit for Andorra or Monaco.; A flight crew in the performance of your duties, to travel only in the airport or surrounding areas for the duration of the stopover.; A seafarer, holding a "seaman's book" recognised by the French authorities, in order to go ashore in the authorised area for the duration of the stopover. (By authorised area, we mean the port area, the commune of the port of call, the neighbouring communes as defined by the Prefect or the State Representative for certain overseas territories), A passenger of a vessel who will remain on board during the stop.; A passenger on a cruise ship and you plan to enter and stay during the period of the stopover, and you hold a valid residence permit issued by a Member State of the European Union, the European Economic Area or Switzerland, or issued by Andorra, Monaco, San Marino, Canada, Japan or the United States of America authorising readmission to these States, or if you hold a valid visa issued by a French authority for another part of the territory of France.
Greenland	Visa required	Schengen visa is required.
Montserrat	eVisa	Multiple entry eVisa valid for 1 year can be obtained through the internet, prior to departure.
Puerto Rico	Visa required	Visa issued by the United States is required.
Saint Pierre and Miquelon	Visa required	Permanent Residents of Canada are exempted from passport and visa requirements for stays of maximum duration of 3 months within a period of 6 months.
Sint Maarten	Visa required	Visa-free if U.S., UK, Canada or Schengen Area resident permit holder or cruise ship passenger staying not more than 48 hours
Turks and Caicos Islands	Visa required	You do not need a visa if you have a valid: US Tourist or Resident Visa (including an H-1B work visa or green card).; UK Tourist or Resident Visa.; Canadian Tourist or Resident Visa.
U.S. Virgin Islands	Visa required	Visa issued by the United States is required.
Europe
Abkhazia	Visa required	Tourists from all countries (except Georgia) can visit Abkhazia for a period not exceeding 24 hours as part of an organized tourist group.
Mount Athos	Special permit required	Special permit required (4 days: 25 euro for Orthodox visitors, 35 euro for non-Orthodox visitors, 18 euro for students). there is a visitors' quota: maximum 100 Orthodox and 10 non-Orthodox per day and women are not allowed.
Republic of Crimea	Visa required	Visa issued by Russia is required.
Turkish Republic of Northern Cyprus	Visa not required	3 months
(United Nations) UN Buffer Zone in Cyprus	Access Permit required	Access Permit is required for travelling inside the zone, except Civil Use Areas.
Faroe Islands	Visa required	
Gibraltar	Visa required	British visa is required.
Guernsey	Visa required	British visa is required.
Isle of Man	Visa required	British visa is required.
(Norway) Jan Mayen	Permit required	Permit issued by the local police required for staying for less than 24 hours and permit issued by the Norwegian police for staying for more than 24 hours.
Jersey	Visa required	British visa is required.
Kosovo	Visa required	Visa-free for a maximum stay of 15 days for valid visa holders or residents of the Schengen Area member states.; Do not need a visa a holder of a valid biometric residence permit issued by one of the Schengen member states or a valid multi-entry Schengen Visa, a holder of a valid Laissez-Passer issued by United Nations Organizations, NATO, OSCE, Council of Europe or European Union a holder of a valid travel documents issued by EU Member and Schengen States, United States of America, Canada, Australia and Japan based on the 1951 Convention on Refugee Status or the 1954 Convention on the Status of Stateless Persons, as well as holders of valid travel documents for foreigners (max. 15 days stay)
Russia	Special authorization required	Several closed cities and regions in Russia require special authorization.
South Ossetia	Visa required	To enter South Ossetia, visitors must have a multiple-entry visa for Russia and register their stay with the Migration Service of the Ministry of Internal Affairs within 3 days.
Svalbard	Visa not required	Svalbard Treaty allows everybody to live and work in Svalbard indefinitely regardless of country of citizenship.
Transnistria	Visa not required	Visitors must complete and obtain a temporary migration card at the border checkpoint. The maximum period of stay is 45 days, and it can be extended multiple times through this card.
Oceania
American Samoa	Entry permit required	A qualified local sponsor must apply to the immigration office on behalf of the applicant.; Holders of a valid U.S. visa or green card may apply online for a visitor permit for a stay of up to 30 days, at least 3 business days before travel.
(Australia) Ashmore and Cartier Islands	Special authorisation required	Special authorisation required.
(France) Clipperton Island	Special permit required	Special permit required.
Cook Islands	Visa not required	31 days
(Fiji) Lau Province	Special permission required	Special permission required.
French Polynesia	Visa required	
Guam	Visa required	US visa is required.
New Caledonia	Visa required	
Northern Mariana Islands	Visa required	US visa is required.
Niue	Visa not required	30 days
Pitcairn Islands	Visa not required	14 days visa-free and landing fee 35 USD or tax of 5 USD if not going ashore.
United States Minor Outlying Islands	Special permits required	Special permits required for Baker Island, Howland Island, Jarvis Island, Johnston Atoll, Kingman Reef, Midway Atoll, Palmyra Atoll and Wake Island.
Wallis and Futuna	Visa required	
South America
Galápagos	Pre-registration required	60 days; Visitors must pre-register to receive a 20 USD Transit Control Card (TCT).
South Atlantic and Antarctica
Falkland Islands	Visa required	
South Georgia and the South Sandwich Islands	Permit required	Pre-arrival permit from the Commissioner required (72 hours/1 month for 110/160 pounds sterling).
Antarctica	Special Permits required	Special permits required for British Antarctic Territory, French Southern and Antarctic Lands, Argentine Antarctica, (Australia) Australian Antarctic Territory, (Antártica Chilena Province) Chilean Antarctic Territory, (Australia) Heard Island and McDonald Islands, (Norway) Peter I Island, (Norway) Queen Maud Land, (New Zealand) Ross Dependency.

== APEC Business Travel Card ==
Full members of the scheme Transitional members (United States, Canada)

Holders of an APEC Business Travel Card (ABTC) travelling on business do not require a visa to the following countries:

- Australia^{2}
- Brunei^{2}
- Chile^{2}
- China^{4}
- Hong Kong^{4}
- Indonesia^{4}
- Japan^{2}
- Malaysia^{2}
- Mexico^{1}
- New Zealand^{2}
- Papua New Guinea^{4}
- Peru^{2}
- Russia^{3}
- Singapore^{4}
- South Korea^{2}
- Taiwan^{2}
- Thailand^{2}
- Vietnam^{4}

_{1 - Up to 180 days}
_{2 - Up to 90 days}
_{3 - Up to 90 days in a period of 180 days}
_{4 - Up to 60 days}

The card must be used in conjunction with a passport and has the following advantages:

- No need to apply for a visa or entry permit to APEC countries, as the card is treated as such (except by Canada and United States)
- Undertake legitimate business in participating economies
- Expedited border crossing in all member economies, including transitional members

== Non-visa restrictions ==
=== Blank passport pages ===
Many countries require a minimum number of blank pages to be available in the passport being presented, typically one or two pages. Endorsement pages, which often appear after the visa pages, are not counted as being valid or available.

=== Vaccination ===
Cover of the new International Certificate of Vaccination issued by the Bureau of Quarantine in the Philippines since 2021

The African countries of Angola, Benin, Burkina Faso, Burundi, Cameroon, Central African Republic, Democratic Republic of the Congo, Republic of the Congo, Côte d'Ivoire, Gabon, Ghana, Guinea-Bissau, Mali, Niger, Sierra Leone and Togo, South Sudan and Uganda, along with French Guiana in South America, require all incoming passengers older than nine months to one year, to have a current International Certificate of Vaccination or Prophylaxis.

Some other countries require vaccination only if the passenger is coming from an infected area or has visited one recently or has transited for 12 hours in those countries: Algeria, Botswana, Cabo Verde, Chad, Djibouti, Egypt, Eswatini, Ethiopia, Gambia, Ghana, Guinea, Lesotho, Libya, Equatorial Guinea, Eritrea, Madagascar, Malawi, Mauritania, Mauritius, Mozambique, Namibia, Nigeria, Papua New Guinea, Seychelles, Somalia, South Africa, Sudan, Tunisia, Uganda, Tanzania, Zambia and Zimbabwe.

=== Passport validity length ===
Very few countries, such as Paraguay, just require a valid passport on arrival.

However many countries and groupings now require only an identity card – especially from their neighbours. Other countries may have special bilateral arrangements that depart from the generality of their passport validity length policies to shorten the period of passport validity required for each other's citizens or even accept passports that have already expired (but not been cancelled).

Some countries, such as Japan, Ireland and the United Kingdom, require a passport valid throughout the period of the intended stay.

In the absence of specific bilateral agreements, countries requiring passports to be valid for at least 6 more months on arrival include Afghanistan, Algeria, Anguilla, Bahrain, Bhutan, Botswana, British Virgin Islands, Brunei, Cambodia, Cameroon, Cape Verde, Cayman Islands, Central African Republic, Chad, Comoros, Costa Rica, Côte d'Ivoire, Curaçao, Ecuador, Egypt, El Salvador, Equatorial Guinea, Fiji, Gabon, Guinea Bissau, Guyana, Haiti, India, Indonesia, Iran, Iraq, Israel, Jordan, Kenya, Kiribati, Kuwait, Laos, Madagascar, Malaysia, Marshall Islands, Mongolia, Myanmar, Namibia, Nepal, Nicaragua, Nigeria, Oman, Palau, Papua New Guinea, Peru, Philippines, Qatar, Rwanda, Samoa, Saudi Arabia, Singapore, Solomon Islands, Somalia, Sri Lanka, Sudan, Suriname, Tanzania, Thailand, Timor-Leste, Tokelau, Tonga, Turkey, Tuvalu, Uganda, United Arab Emirates, Vanuatu, Venezuela, and Vietnam.

Countries requiring passports valid for at least 4 months on arrival include Micronesia and Zambia.

Countries requiring passports with a validity of at least 3 months beyond the date of intended departure include Azerbaijan, Bosnia and Herzegovina, Honduras, Montenegro, Nauru, Moldova and New Zealand. Similarly, the EEA countries of Iceland, Liechtenstein, Norway, all European Union countries (except Ireland) together with Switzerland also require 3 months validity beyond the date of the bearer's intended departure unless the bearer is an EEA or Swiss national.

Countries requiring passports valid for at least 3 months on arrival include Albania, North Macedonia, Panama, and Senegal.

Bermuda requires passports to be valid for at least 45 days upon entry.

Countries that require a passport validity of at least one month beyond the date of intended departure include Eritrea, Hong Kong, Lebanon, Macau, the Maldives and South Africa.

==== Maximum passport age ====
Countries of the Schengen area require non-EU passports to be less than 10 years old upon entry.

=== Criminal record ===
Some countries, including Australia, Canada, Fiji, New Zealand and the United States, routinely deny entry to non-citizens who have a criminal record, while others impose restrictions depending on the type of conviction and the length of the sentence.

=== Persona non grata ===
The government of a country can declare a diplomat persona non grata, banning them from entering the country or expelling them if they have already entered. In non-diplomatic use, the authorities of a country may also declare a foreigner persona non grata permanently or temporarily, usually because of unlawful activity.

=== Israeli stamps ===
Kuwait, Lebanon, Libya, and Yemen do not allow entry to people with passport stamps from Israel or whose passports have either a used or an unused Israeli visa, or where there is evidence of previous travel to Israel such as entry or exit stamps from neighbouring border posts in transit countries such as Jordan and Egypt.

To circumvent this Arab League boycott of Israel, the Israeli immigration services have now mostly ceased to stamp foreign nationals' passports on either entry to or exit from Israel (unless the entry is for some work-related purposes). Since 15 January 2013, Israel no longer stamps foreign passports at Ben Gurion Airport. Passports are still (as of 22 June 2017) stamped at Erez when passing into and out of Gaza.

Iran refuses admission to holders of passports containing an Israeli visa or stamp that is less than 12 months old.

=== Biometrics ===
Several countries mandate that all travellers, or all foreign travellers, be fingerprinted on arrival and will refuse admission to or even arrest travellers who refuse to comply. In some countries, such as the United States, this may apply even to transit passengers who merely wish to change planes rather than go landside.

Fingerprinting countries/regions include Afghanistan, Argentina, Brunei, Cambodia, China, Ethiopia, Ghana, Guinea, India, Japan, Kenya (both fingerprints and a photo are taken), Malaysia upon entry and departure, Mongolia, Saudi Arabia, the Schengen Area, Singapore, South Korea, Taiwan, Thailand, Uganda, the United Arab Emirates and the United States.

Many countries also require a photo be taken of people entering the country. The United States, which does not fully implement exit control formalities at its land frontiers (although long mandated by its own legislation), intends to implement facial recognition for passengers departing from international airports to identify people who overstay their visa.

Together with fingerprint and face recognition, iris scanning is one of three biometric identification technologies internationally standardised since 2006 by the International Civil Aviation Organization (ICAO) for use in e-passports and the United Arab Emirates conducts iris scanning on visitors who need to apply for a visa. The United States Department of Homeland Security has announced plans to greatly increase the biometric data it collects at US borders. In 2018, Singapore began trials of iris scanning at three land and maritime immigration checkpoints.

== See also ==
- Visa policy of the Philippines
- Philippine passport
