= Philippine passport =

Travel document and primary national identity document for citizens of the Philippines

Philippine passport; Pasaporte ng Pilipinas
- The front cover of a contemporary Philippine biometric passport using Trajan font. Hatching has also been added to the national coat-of-arms to indicate correct heraldic tinctures.

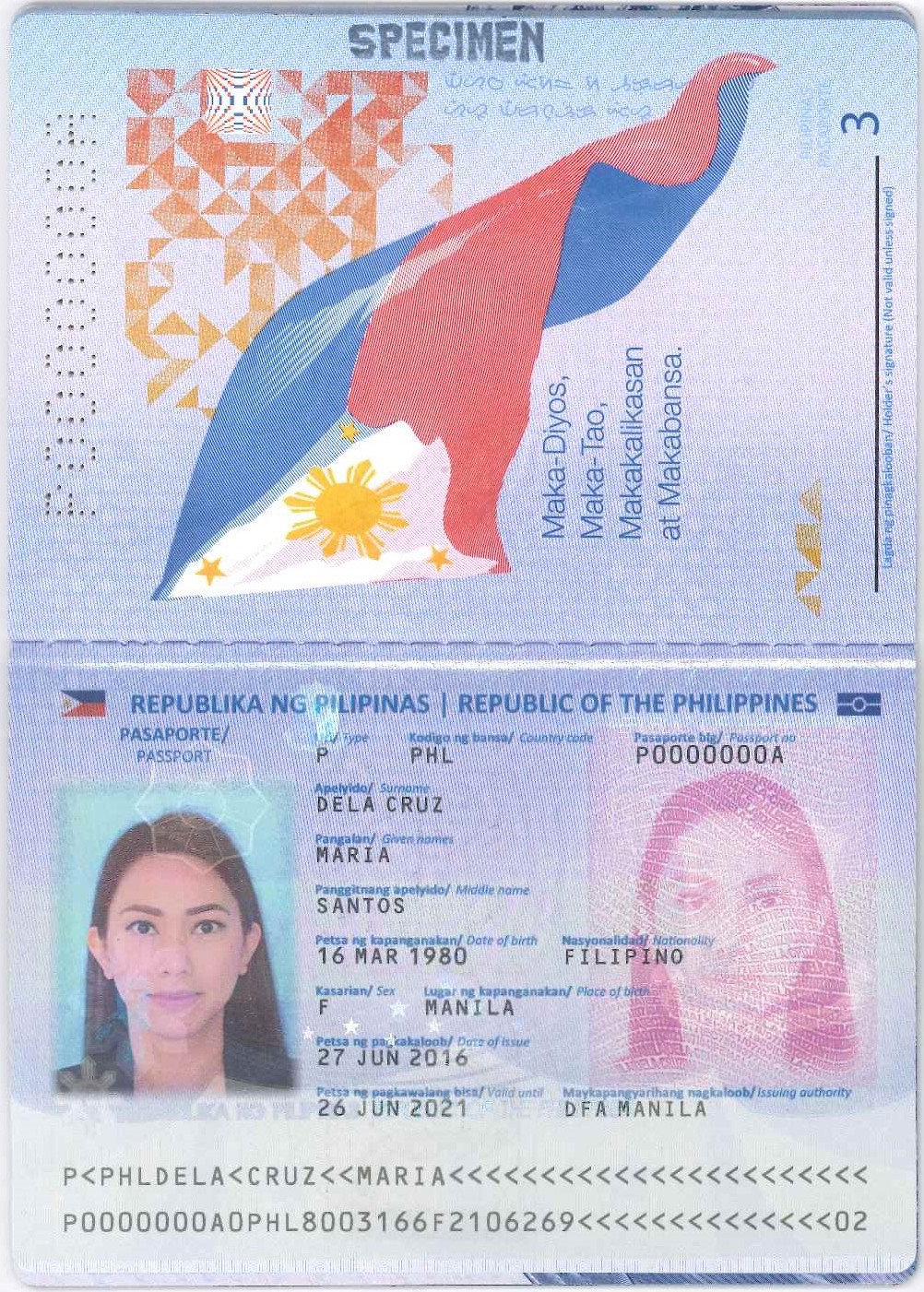
- The data page of biometric passports issued after August 15, 2016. Note the signature field on page 3, in contrast to previous biometric passports.
- Type: Passport
- Issued by: (Philippines) Department of Foreign Affairs
- First issued: 1946 (first edition); September 17, 2007 (machine-readable passport); August 11, 2009 (first edition biometric passport); August 15, 2016 (current edition biometric passport)
- Purpose: Identification
- Eligibility: Filipino citizenship
- Expiration: 5 years (minors below age 18); 10 years (at least age 18)
- Cost: ₱950 (12 working days processing time), ₱1,200 (6 working days processing time), or $60 (Foreign service posts)

A Philippine passport (Filipino: Pasaporte ng Pilipinas) is both a travel document and a primary national identity document issued to citizens of the Philippines. It is issued by the Department of Foreign Affairs (DFA) and Philippine diplomatic missions abroad, with certain exceptions.

The DFA began issuing maroon machine-readable passports on September 17, 2007, and biometric passports on August 11, 2009. Green colored cover non-electronic passports remained valid until they expired. Philippine passports are printed at the Asian Productivity Organization (APO) Production Unit plant in Malvar, Batangas.

== History ==
A Philippine passport from 1947, issued to President Elpidio Quirino.

Prior to the Spaniards' arrival in the Philippine islands, indigenous peoples have been travelling freely within the islands and to neighboring Asian states to facilitate trade and commerce, primarily in the form of seafaring. During the Spanish colonization of the Philippines, the Spaniards introduced a travel document to the Philippines called the chapa, or a writ of safety to go from one place to another, which the natives used from the 16th to 17th centuries.

Philippine passports were released after gaining independence from the United States in 1946. Passports were ordered to be printed in Filipino for the first time under President Diosdado Macapagal, to be subsequently implemented under his successor, Ferdinand Marcos. Currently, it is printed in Filipino with English translations.

With the adoption of the 1987 constitution, the power of issuing passports was transferred from the Ministry of Foreign Affairs to the current Department of Foreign Affairs. The Philippine Passport Act of 1996 governs the issuance of Philippine passports and travel documents. Philippine passports are only issued to Filipino citizens, while travel documents (under Section 13) may be issued to citizens who have lost their passports overseas, as well as permanent residents who cannot obtain passports or travel documents from other countries.

On May 1, 1995, green covers were instituted on regular passports for the first time, and barcodes were inserted in passports in 2004. The new security-enhanced passport is a prerequisite to the issuance of new machine-readable passports which was first issued to the public on September 17, 2007. The Philippines used to be one of the few countries in the world that had not yet issue machine-readable regular passports although machine-readable passports for public officials have been issued since June 18, 2007.

On August 2, 2017, Republic Act 10928 was approved by President Rodrigo Duterte, which extends the validity of passport from 5 years to 10 years. Foreign Secretary Alan Cayetano signed the implementing rules and regulations (IRR) of the new Philippine Passport Act on October 27, 2017. The act was implemented on January 1, 2018.

=== 'New Philippine Passport Act' ===
On March 11, 2024, Marcos Jr. signed Republic Act No. 11983 better known as the "New Philippine Passport Act," repealing the Passport Act of 1996. The Department of Foreign Affairs is mandated under the law to establish and maintain an online application portal and Electronic one-stop shop to digitize passport applications and authorizes it to provide offsite and mobile passport services outside of the consular offices and foreign service posts. The new law requires setting up special lanes to ease application for senior citizens, overseas Filipino Worker, PWDs, pregnant women, minors aged 7 years old and below, single parents, and other exceptional cases.

=== Machine-readable passports ===
In 2006, the DFA and the Bangko Sentral ng Pilipinas started a five-year passport modernization project designed to issue new Philippine machine-readable passports (MRP). However, an injunction was issued against the project by a lower court, only to be overturned by the Supreme Court and ordering the DFA and the BSP to continue the project.

The machine-readable passport is designed to prevent tampering through the use of a special features embedded in the passport cover, similar to other machine-readable passports. It also has more pages than the previous passport (44 pages instead of the previous 32) and processing times were expected to be accelerated.

Officials from the DFA had clarified that the older, green, non-MRP passports will expire as scheduled on their original expiration dates. However, the International Civil Aviation Organisation (ICAO) requires all member states to issue machine-readable passports by April 2010, hence some countries could have had then denied entry to Filipinos who still only had the green, hand-written passports.

=== Biometric passport ===
In late July 2008, the DFA has announced plans and the possible implementation of a new Biometric Passport System for new passports. It is expected that the government will start issuing biometric passports by the end of 2009. On August 11, 2009, the first biometric passport was released for President Gloria Macapagal Arroyo. The e-passport had various security features, including a hidden encoded image; an ultra-thin, holographic laminate; and a tamper-proof electronic microchip costing at around 950 pesos for the normal processing of 20 days or 1,200 pesos for the rush processing of 10 days.

As of July 2015, the Philippine passport is printed in the Asian Productivity Organization or APO Productions under the Presidential Communications Group. On August 15, 2016, the new generation e-passport was released by the Department of Foreign Affairs with advanced security features such as the upgraded microchip to capture the personal data of the applicant, invisible ultraviolet (UV) fluorescent ink and thread, and elaborate design when subject to UV light. Security inks were also used to print the passports to prevent forgery. These inks include intaglio, which are visible inks that have a distinct ridged feel and ultraviolet ink that appears when exposed to infrared lights. Other security features include watermarks, perforated passport numbering, embedded security fibers, among others. Aside from making the new e-passport tamper-proof, each leaf of the 44-page document depicts Philippine artifacts, cultural icons, historic places, renowned tourist destinations, and even lyrics of the national anthem in the pre-Hispanic Baybayin script used to write Tagalog.

=== Restrictions ===
With the declaration of martial law on September 23, 1972, travel restrictions were imposed on Philippine citizens. A letter of instruction restricted the issuance of passports to members of the Philippine diplomatic service, although this was relaxed in 1981 with the official lifting of martial law.

In 1983, there were orders from the Ministry of Foreign Affairs not to issue any passports to the family of opposition senator Ninoy Aquino Despite the government ban, Aquino was able to acquire one with the help of Rashid Lucman, a former congressman from Mindanao. The passport identified him as Marciál Bonifacio, an alias derived from "martial law" and Fort Bonifacio, where he was detained.

In the late 1980s and early 1990s, passports were stamped with limitations prohibiting travel to South Africa (because of apartheid) and Lebanon (because of the civil war). Passports were previously stamped prohibiting travel to Iraq due to the ongoing violence and because of the kidnapping of Angelo dela Cruz in 2004. However, passports printed after July 1, 2011, no longer bear this stamp.

== Types ==
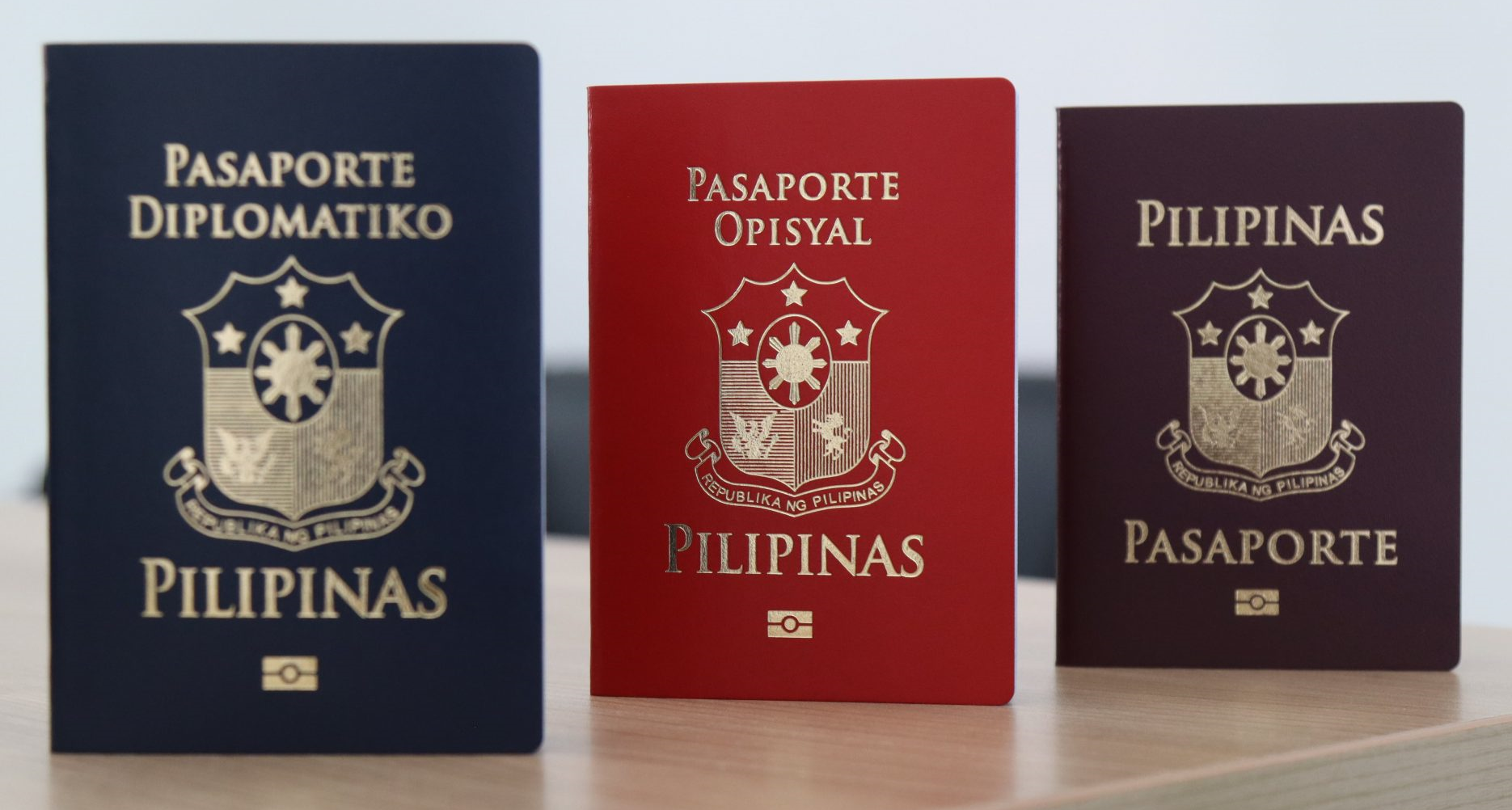
Current editions of the Philippine biometric passport. From left to right: diplomatic, official, and regular.

There are three types of Philippine passports issued by the Department of Foreign Affairs. These are currently designated by the colors maroon (regular), red (official), and dark blue (diplomatic).

=== Regular (maroon) ===
A regular passport is issued to any citizen of the Philippines applying for a Philippine passport. It is the most common type of passport issued and is used for all travel by Philippine citizens and non-official travel by Philippine government officials.

=== Official (red) ===
An official passport is issued to members of the Philippine government for use on official business, as well as employees of Philippine diplomatic posts abroad who are not members of the diplomatic service. It is the second of two passports issued to the President and the Presidential family. As such, this passport does not extend the privilege of diplomatic immunity. Government officials are prohibited from using official passports for non-official business, and as such also have regular passports. This passport has a red cover. This passport has a validity of 6 months.

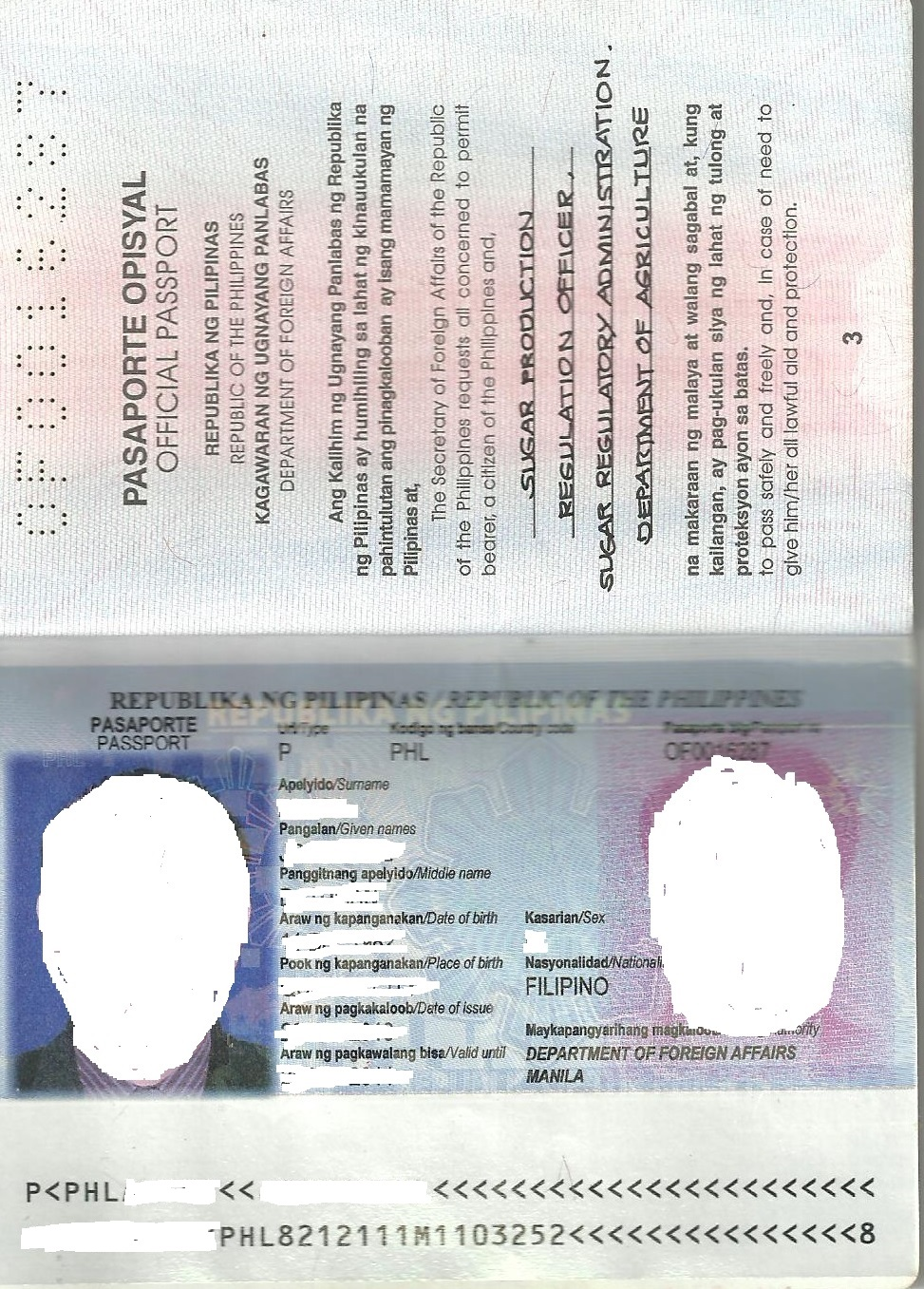
First edition biometric Philippine Official (Red) passport (page 2–3).

=== Diplomatic (blue) ===
A diplomatic passport is issued to members of the Philippine diplomatic service, members of the Cabinet, service attachés of other government agencies assigned to Philippine diplomatic posts abroad and Philippine delegates to international and regional organizations. It is the first of two passports issued to the President of the Philippines and the Presidential family. This passport has a dark blue cover and extends the privilege of diplomatic immunity to the bearer.

=== Other ===
When two Philippine eagles were loaned to Singapore, the birds were issued maroon passports when they were transported out of the Philippines in June 2019. The passports were however not valid as a travel document and are merely symbolic to express a statement that the birds remain Philippine government property.

In addition to standard passports, the DFA also issues a green-colored refugee travel document, and the Maritime Industry Authority issues a dark blue Seafarer's Record Book (SRB) for licensed commercial sailors.

== Appearance ==
Philippine passports are maroon, with the coat of arms of the Philippines emblazoned in the center of the front cover.

=== Front cover ===
The word "PILIPINAS" is inscribed above the coat of arms, which now has hatchings to indicate the tinctures gules (red, for the right field) and azure (blue, for the left field). The word "PASAPORTE" is inscribed below, with the biometric passport symbol appearing beneath it.

Passports issued during the latter years of the Fourth Republic had the order reversed (strikingly similar to the United States passport), with "PASAPORTE" on top and "REPUBLIKA NG PILIPINAS" on the bottom. All passports issued since this period have the cover in Filipino.

A typical passport has 44 (previously 32 or 64) pages.

=== Languages ===
Philippine passports are bilingual, with both issued text and information page data in Filipino followed by English translations. Brown passports once had all the Filipino text written with diacritics, but this was discontinued in the green and maroon passports. Pages 4–43 have, on one page per 2-page spread, (a) lines(s) of the national anthem, the Lupang Hinirang. The odd pages of pages 3–43 have a Baybayin text that says "Ang katuwiran ay nagpapadakila sa isang bayan" ("Righteousness exalts a nation") in reference to Proverbs 14:34 (ᜀᜅ᜔ ᜃᜆᜓᜏᜒᜇᜈ᜔ ᜀᜌ᜔ ᜈᜄ᜔ᜉᜉᜇᜃᜒᜎ ᜐ ᜁᜐᜅ᜔ ᜊᜌᜈ᜔).

=== Identity Information page ===
Philippine passports have different styles of data pages. Old brown passports have both a data and physical description page, with the picture located on the description page rather than the data page; these are separated by the passport note. Green passports issued before 2004 have the data page on the inner cover followed by the passport note page. Passports issued after 2004 have the passport note and data pages reversed, with the passport note on the inner cover page.

The data page contains the following information:

- Passport type
  - Philippine passports issued until February 28, 2026 used P to indicate the passport type. Passports issued after March 1, 2026 use two-letter codes, with regular passports using PP to indicate the passport type.
- Country code (PHL)
- Passport number
  - Passport numbers vary with each type of passport. Brown passports have a letter followed by six numbers, while green passports issued before 2005 have two letters followed by six numbers. Passports issued after 2005 (including machine-readable and biometric passports issued prior to August 15, 2016) have two letters followed by seven numbers. Passports issued after August 15, 2016, have a letter followed by seven numbers, which is then followed by another letter.
- Names
  - A bearer's last name goes first, followed by the first names and middle name (mother's maiden last name)
- Nationality (Filipino)
- Date of birth (written in DD-MMM-YYYY date format with months abbreviated)
- Place of birth
- Sex (M or F)
- Date of issue
- Date of expiry
  - A Philippine passport is valid for ten years for adults and five years for minors from the date of issue. Passports issued from 1981 to 1986 were valid for two years and may be extended for another two years. Passports issued before January 1, 2018, were valid for five years.
- Issuing authority
  - Valid issuing authorities for Philippine passports include the main office of the Department of Foreign Affairs in Manila, branch offices of the DFA located in certain cities around the Philippines, and Philippine embassies and consulates abroad.
- Signature of bearer (for biometric passports)

With new maroon-covered passports, the passport data page ends with the Machine Readable Zone. This zone is absent in green-covered passports.

=== Passport note ===
Passports contain a note from the issuing state that is addressed to the authorities of all other states, identifying the bearer as a citizen of that state and requesting that he or she be allowed to pass and be treated according to international norms. The note is first written in Filipino followed by the English translation:

in Filipino:

"Ang Pamahalaan ng Republika ng Pilipinas ay humihiling sa lahat na kinauukulan na pahintulutan ang pinagkalooban nito, isang mamamayan ng Pilipinas, na makaraan nang malaya at walang sagabal, at kung kailangan, ay pag-ukulan siya ng lahat ng tulong at proteksyon ayon sa batas."

in English:

"The Government of the Republic of the Philippines requests all concerned to permit the bearer, a citizen of the Philippines, to pass safely and freely and in case of need to give him/her all lawful aid and protection."

At the last page (on page 44) are the emergency contact details, and a warning about E-Passport

in Filipino:

"Ang pasaporteng ito ay naglalaman ng sensitibong electronics. Huwag tupiin, butasan, o ilantad sa labis na init o lamig ang pasaporteng ito. Ingatan din na huwag mabasa."

in English:

"This passport contains sensitive electronics. Do not bend, perforate, or expose this passport to extreme temperature, or excess moisture."

=== Signature field ===
A Philippine passport is invalid if the passport is not signed, and normally the bearer affixes his/her signature on the signature field, whose position has varied with various incarnations of Philippine passports. Persons too young to sign a passport previously may have a parent or legal guardian sign the passport on their behalf, although this has since been prohibited.

Brown passports originally contained the signature field below the data page at the passport's inner cover. When green passports began being issued in 1995, a field where the bearer must sign the passport appeared below the passport note.

Machine-readable passports originally had no signature field, a source of much controversy as Filipinos applying for foreign visas, whether for travel or employment, have either been requested to get a copy of their passport application form to verify their signature, or denied altogether. Newer versions of this passport eventually had the signature field at the back cover, below the important reminders for Philippine passport holders, while older versions have the field stamped on.

Biometric passports from August 2009 to August 2016, are the only Philippine passports which do not require the physical signature of the bearer, as an image of the bearer's signature is printed onto the passport data page. Physical signatures are once again required for biometric passports issued after August 15, 2016, with the signature field on page 3.

== Visa requirements ==
Countries and territories with visa-free entries or visas on arrival for holders of regular Philippine passports Philippines Visa not required Visa on arrival eVisa Visa available both on arrival or online Visa required

As of January 2026, Philippine citizens had visa-free or visa on arrival access to 64 countries and territories, ranking the Philippine passport 73rd in terms of travel freedom according to the Henley Passport Index.

From July 9, 2023, provided that they were issued a Canadian visa within the last 10 years (i.e., even if it already expired) or is a holder of valid non-immigrant US visa, and flying to Canada, holders of this passport can travel to and stay visa-free in Canada for up to 6 months - only needing to apply for an ETA beforehand. Philippine travelers must apply for a visa if they are arriving in Canada through a different transportation method.

== Fees ==
The new biometric Philippine passport costs 950 pesos (approximately $18) in the Philippines or $60 abroad. Overtime processing for new passports costs an additional 250 pesos. Persons who take advantage of overtime processing get their passports within seven days for applications for Metro Manila (DFA Consular Affairs office, ASEANA, Parañaque, Alabang Town Center, SM Megamall, and Robinsons Galleria); Region 3 (DFA Pampanga regional office, Marquee Mall in Angeles, Robinson Starmills in Pampanga and Xentro Mall in Malolos, Bulacan), Region 4-A (DFA Lucena regional office, Robinsons Lipa in Batangas, SM City Dasmariñas in Cavite, SM City San Pablo in Laguna and SM Cherry Antipolo in Rizal), Cordillera Administrative Region (Baguio City's SM City Baguio's DFA office) and 15 to 20 days in other provinces. For Filipinos abroad, it will take up to 120 days. Passports previously could be amended for 100 pesos (approx. $2.50) in the Philippines or $20 abroad, although machine-readable passports are no longer amendable.

Lost or stolen passports may be replaced for 700 pesos (approx. $14) in the Philippines, $90 abroad.

As of 2018, the DFA requires all applicants (new or renewal) to secure an appointment online through their website.

== Gallery of historic images ==
Original Philippine passport used in the late 1940s.

Brown passport issued before May 1, 1995.

Data page of the old brown passport. It had a limitation preventing travel to South Africa due to the apartheid policy.

Green passport issued from May 1, 1995, to September 16, 2007.

Data page of the old green passport.

Maroon machine-readable passport issued from September 17, 2007, to August 10, 2009.

Data page of the old maroon machine-readable passport. It had a limitation on page 3 preventing travel to Iraq as part of the government's labor deployment ban there.

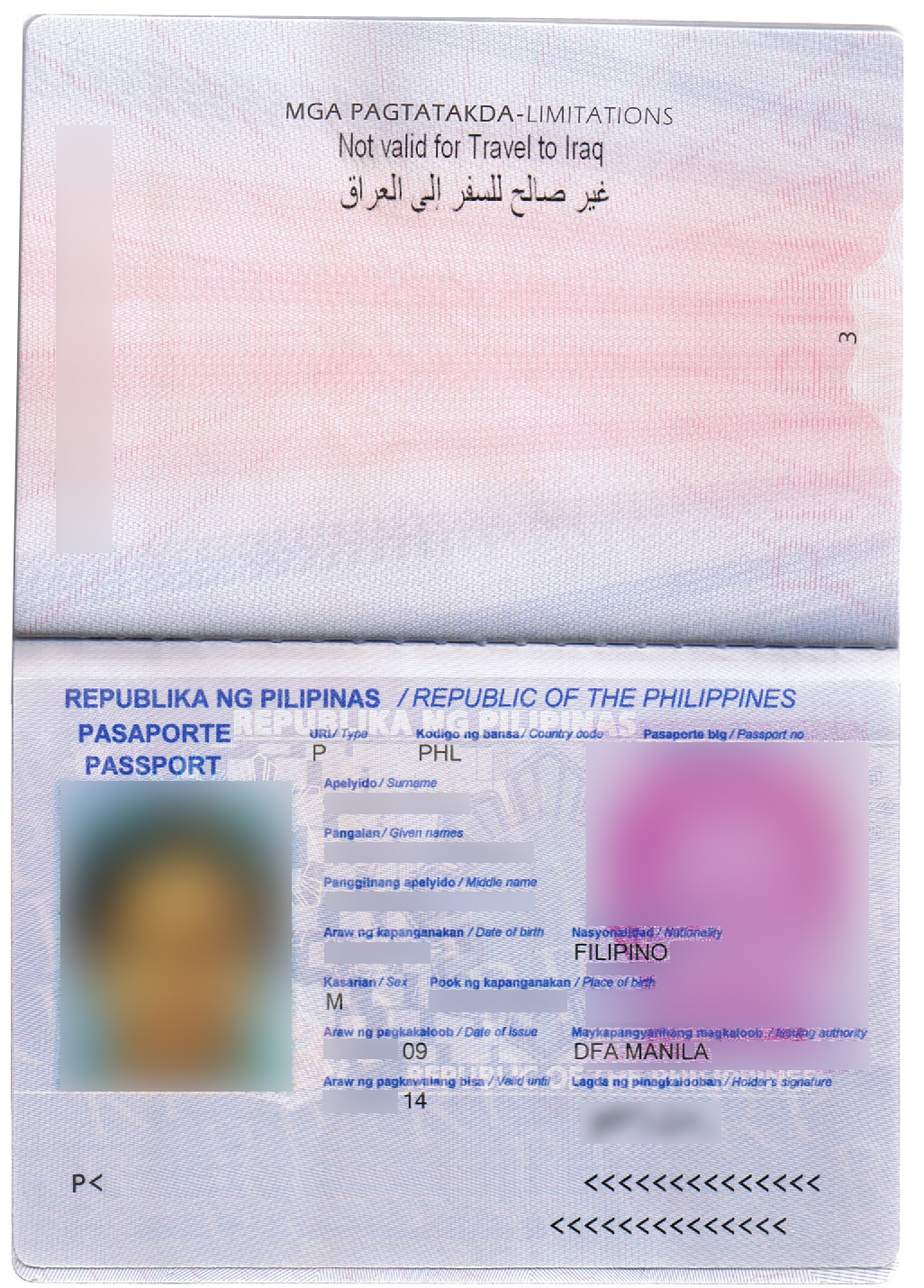
Data page of biometric passports issued before August 15, 2016, also containing the limitation overprint.

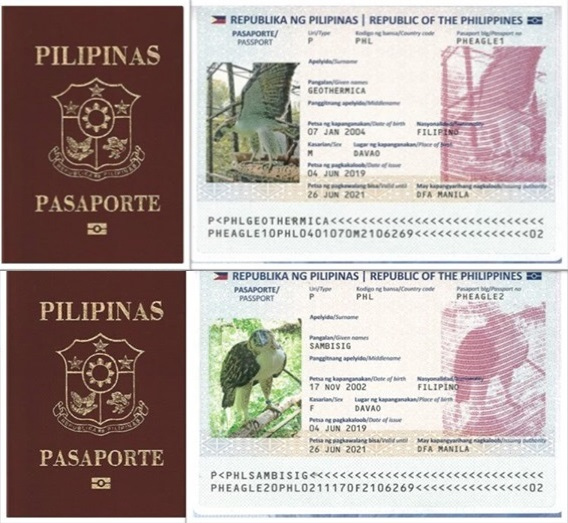
Symbolic passports issued to the Philippine eagle pair, Geothermica and Sambisig, loaned to Singapore.

== See also ==
- List of passport offices in the Philippines
- Visa requirements for Filipino citizens
- Department of Foreign Affairs
- Foreign relations of the Philippines
- Philippine nationality law
- Unified Multi-Purpose ID
