= Oath of Allegiance (Philippines) =

The Oath of Allegiance (Filipino: Panunumpa ng Katapatan) is an oath administered to and recited by immigrants who wish to accede to the citizenship of the Republic of the Philippines. The current oath, based on the United States Oath of Allegiance, was first enshrined in Commonwealth Act No. 473, the Revised Naturalization Law of 1939, with the modern version enshrined in Republic Act No. 9225, the Citizenship Retention and Re-acquisition Act of 2003.

== History and composition ==
Prior to the promulgation of the Commonwealth of the Philippines, residents of the Philippines were considered nationals of the United States, and naturalization was governed by Act No. 2927, the Naturalization Law, passed by the Philippine Legislature. However, with the passage of the Tydings–McDuffie Act in 1934, national status for residents of the Philippines was revoked in preparation for the islands' independence, and the question of nationality was passed on to the then-newly formed Commonwealth government inaugurated in 1935. Pursuant to Article IV of the 1935 Constitution, the National Assembly of the Philippines passed Commonwealth Act No. 473, the Revised Naturalization Law of 1939, which provided a mechanism for the acquisition of Filipino nationality by naturalization.

Under Section 14 of the Law, prior to the issuance of a certificate of naturalization, the person petitioning to be granted Filipino citizenship had to recite the following oath in open court:

I, (name), solemnly swear that I renounce absolutely and forever all allegiance and fidelity to any foreign prince, potentate, state or sovereignty, and particularly to the (country of citizenship), of which at this time I am a subject or citizen; that I will support and defend the Constitution of the Philippines and that I will obey the laws, legal orders and decrees promulgated by the duly constituted authorities of the Commonwealth of the Philippines; and I hereby declare that I recognize and accept the supreme authority of the United States of America in the Philippines and will maintain true faith and allegiance thereto; and that I impose this obligation upon myself voluntarily without mental reservation or purpose of evasion. So help me God.

With the independence of the Philippines on July 4, 1946, the oath was modified to remove references to the Commonwealth and the United States, although the language remained virtually the same as the original.

I, (name), solemnly swear that I renounce absolutely and forever all allegiance and fidelity to any foreign prince, potentate, state or sovereignty, and particularly to the (country of citizenship), of which at this time I am a subject; that I will support and defend the Constitution of the Philippines and that I will obey the laws, legal orders and decrees promulgated by the duly constituted authorities of the Republic of the Philippines; and I hereby declare that I recognize and accept the supreme authority of the Republic of the Philippines and will maintain true faith and allegiance thereto; and that I impose this obligation upon myself voluntarily without mental reservation or purpose of evasion. So help me God.

This changed in 2003, when the Philippines legalized multiple citizenship and it no longer became mandatory to renounce foreign citizenship to obtain Filipino citizenship. These modifications were subsequently codified in Section 3 of Republic Act No. 9225, which mandates that former Filipino citizens reacquiring Filipino citizenship take an oath of allegiance to the Republic. The oath in its current form is as follows:

I, (name), solemnly swear (or affirm) that I will support and defend the Constitution of the Republic of the Philippines and obey the laws and legal orders promulgated by the duly constituted authorities of the Philippines; and I hereby declare that I recognize and accept the supreme authority of the Philippines and will maintain true faith and allegiance thereto; and that I imposed this obligation upon myself voluntarily without mental reservation or purpose of evasion. So help me God.

Instead of the oath, a petitioner may choose to recite an affirmation of allegiance instead if religious or personal reasons so require.

== See also ==
- Philippine nationality law
