= Philippine nationality law =

Constitution of the Philippines Article IV: Citizenship

Constitutional Commission
- Territorial extent: Philippines
- Passed by: Constitutional plebiscite
- Passed: February 2, 1987
- Commenced: February 2, 1987
- Status: Current legislation

The Philippines has two primary pieces of legislation governing nationality requirements, the 1987 Constitution of the Philippines and the 1939 Revised Naturalization Law.

Any person born to at least one Filipino parent receives Philippine citizenship at birth. Foreign nationals may naturalize as Philippine citizens after meeting a minimum residence requirement (usually 10 years), acquiring real estate, demonstrating proficiency in either English or Spanish as well as a Philippine language, and fulfilling a good character requirement.

The Philippines was a territory of the United States until 1946 and local residents were non-citizen U.S. nationals in addition to their status as Philippine citizens. During American rule, any person born in the country automatically received Philippine citizenship by birth regardless of the nationalities of their parents. Since independence, citizenship is generally acquired only by descent from Filipino parents.

== Terminology ==
The distinction between the meaning of the terms citizenship and nationality is not always clear in the English language and differs by country. Generally, nationality refers to a status given to an individual indicating the state which exercises jurisdiction over that particular person and is the common term used in international treaties when referring to members of a state; citizenship refers to the set of rights and duties a person has in that nation.

When the Philippines was governed as a United States territory, Philippine citizens held non-citizen U.S. nationality. As American nationals, Filipinos were considered to owe allegiance to the U.S. and held some rights and protections from the federal government, but were excluded from political participation and could be treated as foreigners in some circumstances at the discretion of the United States Congress. In the modern post-independence Philippine context, there is no legal distinction between citizenship and nationality and the two terms are used interchangeably.

== History ==
=== Spanish rule and American conquest ===
The Philippine islands were incorporated into the Spanish Empire during the mid-16th century. Accordingly, Spanish nationality law applied to the colony. No definitive nationality legislation for Philippine residents existed for almost the entire period of Spanish rule until the Civil Code of Spain became applicable in the Philippines on December 8, 1889. Under this law, any person born in a Spanish territory (including the Philippines) or born overseas to a Spanish parent was automatically a Spanish subject at birth. A child under the age of majority held the nationality of their parents unless the parents made a declaration choosing Spanish nationality for the child and had it recorded in the local civil registry. If such a declaration was not made on their behalf, the child could do so within one year of reaching adult age. However, these registries had not been created in the Philippines by 1898, which later became consequential in Philippine law.

Spain governed the islands for over 300 years until they were ceded to the United States in 1898 following the Spanish–American War. Under the terms of the Treaty of Paris, the U.S. Congress held authority to determine the future citizenship of native residents in the Philippines and its other newly acquired territories. Any person born on the Iberian Peninsula who remained resident in the ceded territories could opt to remain Spanish subjects.

=== United States territory ===
Pursuant to the Treaty of Paris, the U.S. Congress enacted the Philippine Organic Act and established separate Philippine citizenship in 1902. Spanish subjects ordinarily resident in the Philippines on April 11, 1899, who remained living there at the time of the Act's passage, and their descendants, became Philippine citizens. Native Filipinos who departed from the Philippines before this Act's enactment remained Spanish subjects. Foreign nationals could naturalize as Philippine citizens under requirements detailed in the 1939 Revised Naturalization Law, which largely remains unchanged. Under this law, individuals intending to become citizens are required to file a petition for naturalization with the Court of First Instance in the province where they had resided for at least the previous year. Philippine women who married foreign men and gained their husbands' nationalities on their marriage automatically lost Philippine citizenship.

Due to American fears that the new territory could be used by Chinese migrants as a way to circumvent immigration restrictions in the U.S. mainland, the Chinese Exclusion Act was extended to the Philippines in 1902. All persons of Chinese origin other than former and existing Philippine residents, as well as those in approved occupational classes, were barred from entering the territory. Chinese immigration was restricted until the Act's repeal in all U.S. territories in 1943.

==== Non-citizen U.S. nationality ====
The U.S. governed the Philippines as an unincorporated territory that was not considered an integral part of the country and where the Constitution of the United States did not fully apply. Philippine citizens were treated as non-citizen U.S. nationals, rather than full citizens. Consequently, they were ineligible to vote in federal, state, and local elections and were excluded from exercising constitutional civil rights. Despite this, they were not considered aliens under U.S. law and were generally exempt from immigration restrictions when entering the U.S. during a time when virtually all other Asians were excluded from entry into the country. However, this was not an unrestricted right, and Filipinos with Chinese ancestry were barred from entering the U.S. mainland under the Chinese Exclusion Act in spite of their non-alien status. Philippine citizens living in the U.S. also had no pathway to full U.S. citizenship during this time unless they served in the United States Armed Forces; contemporary legislation only allowed "white persons, persons of African nativity or descent, and descendants of races indigenous to the Western Hemisphere" the ability to naturalize, with an exception for military personnel and veterans.

While only fewer than 3,000 Filipinos were living in the U.S. in 1910, this number had increased substantially to 110,000 residents by 1930. As non-citizen U.S. nationals, Philippine citizens were eligible for United States passports and afforded the same consular protection as full U.S. citizens when traveling outside of American territory. After the passage of the 1934 Tydings–McDuffie Act, which began a transition period until the territory became independent, Philippine citizens entering the U.S. became subject to an entry quota of only 50 people per year and would thereafter be regarded as aliens for immigration purposes. This drastically decreased the number of Filipinos migrating to the U.S. from over 36,000 in 1931 to just 72 in 1937. Conversely, Philippine citizens who had successfully entered the U.S. could not be subject to deportation nor were they restricted from acquiring property by alien land laws. Filipinos who migrated to the U.S. while the Philippines were a U.S. territory continued to be protected from deportation orders even after Philippine independence in 1946 and the consequent loss of their non-citizen U.S. nationality because they had not entered the U.S. from a foreign place at the time of their entry.

==== Birthright citizenship ====
The lack of clarity in Spanish law applicable in the Philippines before 1898 was tested in Roa v. Collector of Customs, a 1912 case heard by the Supreme Court of the Philippines in which a person born to a Chinese father and Filipina mother prior to the application of the Civil Code was ruled to be a Philippine citizen. Although contemporary law before 1889 was unclear on whether all persons born in the colony were automatically Spanish subjects, the Civil Code was retroactively applied to all births prior to its enactment for the purposes of determining Philippine citizenship. Despite the fact that the child would have been regarded as Chinese had the Civil Code been in force at the time of their birth, they would have had a right to make a declaration to become a Spanish subject within one year of reaching the age of majority but lacked the ability to do so because of the 1898 change in sovereignty. Acknowledging this, the court decided that the circumstantial changes caused by the U.S. conquest should not prevent anyone from becoming a Philippine citizen. Furthermore, the court determined that prevailing conventions for citizenship in the U.S. had become applicable in the territory after the Philippine Organic Act came into force, specifically birthright citizenship in the United States. Subsequently, all children born in the Philippines during this time were considered to have acquired Philippine citizenship by birth. Furthermore, local legislation enacted by the Philippine Legislature ambiguously described "those who acquire the status of citizens of the Philippine Islands by birth", which was interpreted by the Governor-General of the Philippines and the local judiciary as having established birthright citizenship in the same way as the Fourteenth Amendment to the United States Constitution.

As the U.S. prepared to grant the Philippines independence, a constitutional convention was held to draft the 1935 Constitution of the Philippines. This document contained a new definition for who held Philippine citizenship which included any individual who was a citizen at the time of the constitution's adoption, any person born in the country to non-citizen parents but had been elected to public office, someone whose father was a citizen, or a person whose mother was a citizen and who had elected to be a Philippine citizen after reaching the age of majority. When these provisions were adopted, the drafters overlooked the effect of judicial rulings on conferring birthright citizenship and assumed that birth in the Philippines alone was not enough to make a person a Philippine citizen. Although the citizenship definition chosen by the constitutional convention showed a clear preference for citizenship transmission by descent rather than unrestricted birthright citizenship, subsequent court rulings determined that the convention had not decided to overturn the precedent established by the Roa case and upheld the status quo for the time being.

=== Post-independence policies ===
Following Philippine independence in 1946, the Supreme Court changed its position on birthright citizenship in the 1947 case Tam Chong v. Secretary of Labor, in which it overturned the Roa decision and reversed earlier policies granting citizenship by birth to any person born in the Philippines. The court determined that the doctrine of birthright citizenship had not been fully extended to the country either by new supporting legislation since the 1935 Constitution or by extension of the Fourteenth Amendment to the United States Constitution to the Philippines. Since this ruling, Philippine citizenship has primarily been acquired by descent from a Filipino parent.

Although legal statutes governing the requirements for naturalization were largely straightforward and seldom changed, Supreme Court rulings in the immediate post-independence period created a changing landscape of procedural barriers for foreign nationals attempting to acquire citizenship. While the Court had determined in 1948 that a declaration of intention to naturalize was not required of naturalization candidates on the assumption that any such documents were destroyed during the Second World War, it reinforced this prerequisite in a subsequent 1961 decision in which the only exemptions for this requirement were granted to persons who were born and educated in the Philippines and whose children have also been educated in both domestic primary and secondary schools. Further judicial decisions in the 1950s also dictated that the domestic education requirement for children of naturalization candidates could not be waived for circumstances that made enrollment in a Philippine school impossible, including where a child was withdrawn from school due to marriage or where a child could not be enrolled due to their wartime imprisonment.

After martial law was declared in 1972, a new constitution was enacted in 1973 that entrenched dictatorial rule led by Ferdinand Marcos. The citizenship provisions of the new constitution remained almost identical to those in the 1935 version, but removed the requirement for children of Filipina mothers and foreign fathers to formally elect Philippine citizenship upon reaching legal age. Since the 1987 Constitution came into force, persons born to Filipina mothers before January 17, 1973 have again been subject to this formal election requirement. The 1973 constitution also allowed Filipina women who married foreign men to retain Philippine citizenship on their marriage even if they had acquired their husbands' nationalities.

Beginning in the late 1980s, concessions were granted to overseas Filipinos as part of a wider effort to more closely tie migrant Filipino populations with the home country. Over the following decade, former natural-born Philippine citizens were granted visa-free entry, expanded ability to invest, and property purchase rights. These efforts culminated with the passage of the Citizenship Retention and Re-acquisition Act of 2003, which allowed any person who had lost Philippine citizenship due to naturalization in a foreign country to reacquire citizenship and halted further revocations in such cases.

==== Facilitated naturalization pathways ====
By the 1950s, large numbers of ethnic Chinese had been born and raised in the Philippines who treated the country as their home. Encouraged by the newly established People's Republic of China, which directed overseas Chinese populations to naturalize in their chosen places of residence, these local-born Chinese began to apply for naturalization. However, they found the requirements for acquiring citizenship too onerous and expensive and many chose not to complete the process. Ethnic Chinese residents aligned with the Republic of China largely declined to voluntarily become Philippine citizens during this time, adhering to the Kuomintang's policy that overseas Chinese should remain Chinese citizens.

The naturalization process was temporarily streamlined in 1975, allowing individuals who wanted to acquire citizenship to apply through an administrative application procedure rather than through the usually required court petition. Applicants indicated their interest in becoming Philippine citizens to a review committee which would then make recommendations to the president who issued presidential decrees naturalizing successful candidates. Female spouses and minor children of men who naturalized also became Philippine citizens by the same process. Naturalization applications under this facilitated process were required to have been submitted by June 30, 1975. The deadline was extended twice, first to September 30, 1975, and again to April 1, 1976. This expedited process was intended to quickly naturalize a large number of the Chinese Filipino population as part of the Marcos regime's preparations to recognize the People's Republic of China and to minimize potential future problems with that government, though it was not limited to that ethnic group and was open to any foreign nationals. Since June 8, 2001, naturalization under this simplified process was made available to any person born in the Philippines aged at least 18 and who has been resident in the country since birth.

== Acquisition and loss of citizenship ==
Any person born to at least one parent who is a Philippine citizen automatically receives Philippine citizenship at birth. Abandoned children found in the country are presumed to have been born to Philippine citizens and are considered natural-born citizens. Foreign nationals aged 21 or older may naturalize as Philippine citizens after residing in the country for 10 years, acquiring real estate valued at least ₱5,000 or otherwise gainfully employed in a profitable occupation, demonstrating proficiency in English or Spanish as well as a Philippine language, and fulfilling a good character requirement. Additionally, any minor children they may have must be enrolled in a Philippine school. The residency requirement is reduced to five years if an applicant is employed by the Government of the Philippines, has made significant economic or scientific contributions to the state, married to a Filipina woman, has taught in a Philippine school for at least two years, or was born in the country. Individuals wishing to acquire Philippine citizenship must normally petition the Regional Trial Court in the province where they have resided in the preceding 12 months, but those who were born in the country and aged 18 or older may acquire citizenship by application rather than by judicial process.

Any person who falls under one of the following scenarios is barred from naturalizing as a Philippine citizen: they are opposed to organized government, actively promote violence, practice polygamy, have been convicted of a crime constituting moral turpitude, diagnosed with a mental or incurable contagious disease, have not become socially integrated into Filipino society, or hold citizenship of a country that the Philippines is at war with or that does not allow Philippine citizens to naturalize.

Philippine citizenship can be relinquished by making a declaration of renunciation. It is also automatically revoked when a citizen serves in another country's armed forces, swears an oath of allegiance to another country, or deserts the Armed Forces of the Philippines during a time of war. However, voluntary renunciations are prohibited while the country is at war. Natural-born Philippine citizens who previously lost citizenship after naturalization in a foreign country before 2003 may subsequently reacquire Philippine citizenship by taking an oath of allegiance to the Philippines. Filipina women who had lost Philippine citizenship on their marriage to a foreigner or any former Philippine citizen who lost their citizenship due to political or economic reasons before October 23, 1995 may also reacquire Philippine citizenship after taking the oath of allegiance. Any dependents of an individual who naturalize or reacquire Philippine citizenship are also granted citizenship.

== See also ==
- Visa policy of the Philippines
- Visa requirements for Philippine citizens
