= Cabinet of Bongbong Marcos =

Philippine government members

Marcos Cabinet
- Cabinet of the Philippines
- 2022–present
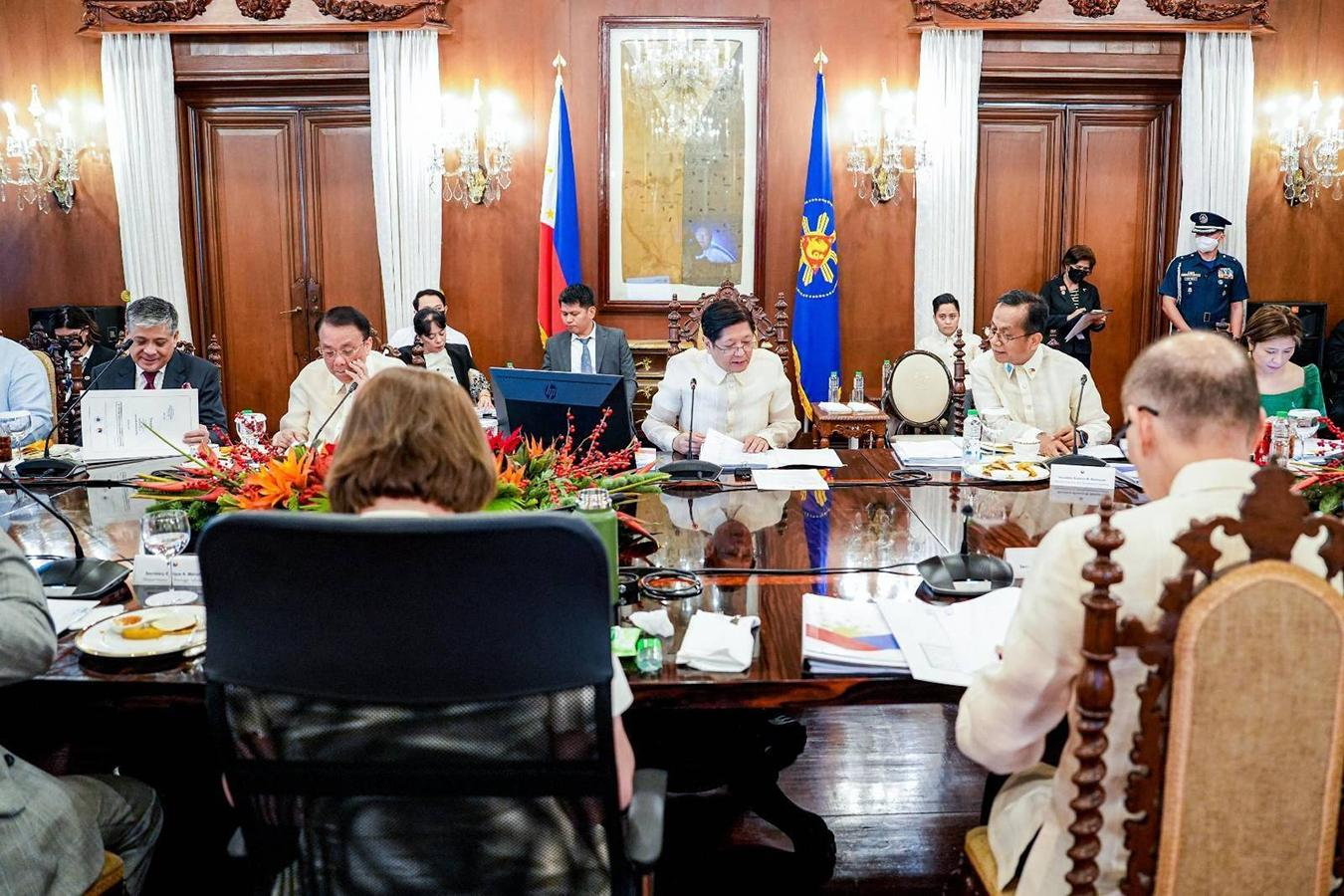
- Marcos presides over a cabinet meeting at the Malacañang Palace in December 2022.
- Date formed: June 30, 2022

People and organisations
- President: Bongbong Marcos
- President's history: 2022–present
- Vice President: Sara Duterte
- Member party: Partido Federal ng Pilipinas; Lakas–CMD; Nacionalista Party; Nationalist People's Coalition; National Unity Party; Laban ng Demokratikong Pilipino; Liberal Party (since 2025); Katipunan ng Nagkakaisang Pilipino (since 2025); Partido Demokratiko Pilipino (until 2024); Hugpong ng Pagbabago (until 2024); Pwersa ng Masang Pilipino (until 2025)
- Opposition party: Akbayan; Makabayan; Partido Demokratiko Pilipino (since 2024); Hugpong ng Pagbabago (since 2024); Pwersa ng Masang Pilipino (since 2025); Liberal Party (until 2025); Katipunan ng Nagkakaisang Pilipino (until 2025)
- Opposition leader: Risa Hontiveros (until 2025)

History
- Election: 2022 Philippine presidential election
- Legislature terms: 19th Congress of the Philippines; 20th Congress of the Philippines
- Advice and consent: Senate of the Philippines
- Predecessor: Cabinet of Rodrigo Duterte

Bongbong Marcos assumed office as the president of the Republic of the Philippines on June 30, 2022, and his term is expected to end on June 30, 2028. As the president, he has the authority to appoint members of his Cabinet, subject to the approval of the Commission on Appointments. Only the vice president is exempted from a confirmation hearing to any cabinet position.

On May 22, 2025, President Marcos reshuffled the Cabinet after a weaker-than-expected showing for the candidates in his Alyansa para sa Bagong Pilipinas in the 2025 Philippine general election.

== Administration and cabinet ==
Office	Name	Term	Refs.
President	Bongbong Marcos	June 30, 2022 –	
Vice President	Sara Duterte	June 30, 2022 –	
Executive Secretary	Vic Rodriguez	June 30, 2022 – September 17, 2022	
Executive Secretary	Lucas Bersamin	September 27, 2022 – November 17, 2025	
Executive Secretary	Ralph Recto	November 17, 2025 –	
Secretary of Agriculture	Bongbong Marcos	June 30, 2022 – November 3, 2023	
Secretary of Agriculture	Francisco Tiu Laurel Jr.	November 3, 2023 –	
Secretary of Education	Sara Duterte	June 30, 2022 – July 19, 2024	
Secretary of Education	Sonny Angara	July 19, 2024 –	
Secretary of Foreign Affairs	Enrique Manalo	July 1, 2022 – July 1, 2025	
Secretary of Foreign Affairs	Tess Lazaro	July 1, 2025 –	
Secretary of Finance	Benjamin Diokno	June 30, 2022 – January 12, 2024	
Secretary of Finance	Ralph Recto	January 12, 2024 – November 17, 2025	
Secretary of Finance	Frederick Go	November 17, 2025 –	
Secretary of Justice	Jesus Crispin Remulla	June 30, 2022 – October 9, 2025	
Secretary of Justice	Fredderick Vida (Acting) (Note: Vida served in an Officer–in–Charge capacity from October 10, 2025 until November 13, 2025.)	October 10, 2025 –	
Secretary of Public Works and Highways	Manuel Bonoan	June 30, 2022 –September 1, 2025	
Secretary of Public Works and Highways	Vince Dizon (Acting)	September 1, 2025 –October 26, 2026	
Secretary of Public Works and Highways	Giovanni Z. Lopez	October 26, 2026 –	
Secretary of Labor and Employment	Bienvenido Laguesma	June 30, 2022 – May 25, 2026	
Secretary of Labor and Employment	Francis Tolentino (Acting)	May 25, 2026 –	
Secretary of National Defense	Jose Faustino Jr. (OIC) (Note: As Faustino retired from military service on November 12, 2021, in adherence to Republic Act 6975 banning the appointment of retired military officers for a year, he will first serve as a senior undersecretary and officer-in-charge of the Department of National Defense beginning June 30, 2022.)	June 30, 2022 –January 9, 2023	
Secretary of National Defense	Carlito Galvez Jr. (OIC)	January 9, 2023 – June 5, 2023	
Secretary of National Defense	Gilbert Teodoro	June 5, 2023 –	
Secretary of Health	Maria Rosario Vergeire (OIC)	July 14, 2022 – June 5, 2023	
Secretary of Health	Ted Herbosa	June 5, 2023 – July 13, 2026	
Secretary of Health	Jose Pujalte Jr.	July 13, 2026 – August 10, 2026	
Secretary of Health	Edwin Mercado	August 10, 2026 –	
Secretary of Trade and Industry	Alfredo E. Pascual	June 30, 2022 – August 2, 2024	
Secretary of Trade and Industry	Cristina Aldeguer-Roque (Note: Aldeguer-Roque served in an acting capacity from August 3 until October 27, 2024.)	August 2, 2024 –	
Secretary of Migrant Workers	Susan Ople	June 30, 2022 –August 22, 2023	
Secretary of Migrant Workers	Hans Cacdac (Note: Cacdac served in an Officer–in–Charge capacity from August 22 to September 7, 2023.)	September 7, 2023 –	
Secretary of Human Settlements and Urban Development	Melissa Ardanas (OIC)	June 30, 2022 – July 29, 2022	
Secretary of Human Settlements and Urban Development	Jose Acuzar	July 29, 2022 – May 22, 2025	
Secretary of Human Settlements and Urban Development	Jose Ramon Aliling	May 23, 2025 –	
Secretary of Social Welfare and Development	Erwin Tulfo	June 30, 2022 – December 23, 2022	
Secretary of Social Welfare and Development	Eduardo Punay (OIC)	December 23, 2022 – January 31, 2023	
Secretary of Social Welfare and Development	Rex Gatchalian	January 31, 2023 –	
Secretary of Agrarian Reform	Conrado Estrella III	June 30, 2022 –	
Secretary of Environment and Natural Resources	Ernesto D. Adobo Jr. (OIC)	June 30, 2022 – July 11, 2022	
Secretary of Environment and Natural Resources	Toni Yulo-Loyzaga	July 12, 2022 – May 22, 2025	
Secretary of Environment and Natural Resources	Raphael Lotilla	May 23, 2025 – February 27, 2026	
Secretary of Environment and Natural Resources	Juan Miguel T. Cuna (Acting)	February 27, 2026 –	
Secretary of the Interior and Local Government	Benhur Abalos	June 30, 2022 – October 7, 2024	
Secretary of the Interior and Local Government	Jonvic Remulla	October 8, 2024 –	
Secretary of Tourism	Christina Frasco	June 30, 2022 – March 12, 2026	
Secretary of Tourism	Verna Buensuceso (OIC)	March 18, 2026 – April 9, 2026	
Secretary of Tourism	Dita Angara-Mathay	April 10, 2026 –	
Secretary of Transportation	Jaime Bautista	June 30, 2022 – February 21, 2025	
Secretary of Transportation	Vince Dizon	February 21, 2025 – September 1, 2025	
Secretary of Transportation	Giovanni Z. Lopez (Acting)	September 1, 2025 – October 26, 2026	
Secretary of Transportation	Vince Dizon	October 26, 2026 –	
Secretary of Science and Technology	Renato Solidum Jr.	July 22, 2022 (Note: Solidum served as the Officer–in–Charge from June 30 to July 22, 2022.) –	
Secretary of Budget and Management	Amenah Pangandaman	June 30, 2022 –November 17, 2025	
Secretary of Budget and Management	Rolando Toledo (Note: Toledo served in an Officer–in–Charge capacity from November 24, 2025, until December 9, 2025.) (Acting)	November 17, 2025 – May 18, 2026	
Secretary of Budget and Management	Kim Robert de Leon	May 19, 2026 –	
Secretary of Energy	Raphael Lotilla	July 11, 2022 – May 22, 2025	
Secretary of Energy	Sharon Garin (Note: Garin served as the Officer–in–Charge from May 23 to July 10, 2025.)	May 23, 2025 –	
Secretary of Information and Communications Technology	Ivan John Uy	June 30, 2022 –March 6, 2025	
Secretary of Information and Communications Technology	Paul Mercado (OIC)	March 10, 2025 – March 19, 2025	
Secretary of Information and Communications Technology	Henry Aguda	March 20, 2025 – October 9, 2026	
Secretary of Information and Communications Technology	Robert Joseph M. de Claro	October 13, 2026 –	
Secretary of the National Economic and Development Authority/ Secretary of Economy, Planning, and Development	Arsenio M. Balisacan	June 30, 2022 –	
Lead Convenor of the National Anti-Poverty Commission	Lope B. Santos III	February 20, 2023 – September 8, 2026	
Lead Convenor of the National Anti-Poverty Commission	Emmanuel D. Pacquiao	September 8, 2026 –	
National Security Adviser	Clarita Carlos	June 30, 2022 – January 14, 2023	
National Security Adviser	Eduardo Año	January 14, 2023 –April 15, 2026	
National Security Adviser	Eduardo SL Oban Jr.	April 15, 2026 –	
Secretary of the Presidential Management Staff	Zenaida Angping	June 30, 2022 – December 2, 2022	
Secretary of the Presidential Management Staff	Elaine Masukat	January 3, 2023 –	
Solicitor General	Menardo Guevarra	June 30, 2022 – May 29, 2025	
Solicitor General	Darlene Berberabe	May 29, 2025 –	
Chief Presidential Legal Counsel	Juan Ponce Enrile	June 30, 2022 – November 13, 2025	
Chief Presidential Legal Counsel	Anna Liza Logan	December 16, 2025 –	
Presidential Adviser on Peace, Reconciliation and Unity	Carlito Galvez Jr.	June 30, 2022 – January 9, 2023	
Presidential Adviser on Peace, Reconciliation and Unity	Isidro Purisima	February 23, 2023 – June 26, 2023	
Presidential Adviser on Peace, Reconciliation and Unity	Carlito Galvez Jr.	June 26, 2023 –April 21, 2026	
Presidential Adviser on Peace, Reconciliation and Unity	Mel Senen Sarmiento	April 21, 2026 –	
Presidential Adviser on Creative Communications	Paul Soriano	October 17, 2022 –November 9, 2023	
Presidential Adviser for Mindanao Concerns	Antonio Cerilles	March 13, 2025 –	
Presidential Adviser for Pasig River Development	Jose Acuzar	May 23, 2025 –	
Presidential Adviser for Poverty Alleviation	Larry Gadon	June 26, 2023 –	
Presidential Assistant for Maritime Concerns	Andres Centino	September 28, 2023 –	
Presidential Adviser on Military and Police Affairs	Roman A. Felix	August 3, 2022 – June 19, 2025	
Presidential Adviser on Legislative Affairs and Head of Presidential Legislative Liaison Office	Mark Llandro Mendoza	August 23, 2022 – June 19, 2025	
Presidential Adviser on Legislative Affairs and Head of Presidential Legislative Liaison Office	Joey Salceda	July 20, 2026 –	
Presidential Communications Group	Trixie Cruz-Angeles	June 30, 2022 – October 4, 2022	
Presidential Communications Group	Cheloy Garafil	October 4, 2022 (Note: Garafil served as the Officer–in–Charge from October 7, 2022 to January 10, 2023.) – September 5, 2024	
Presidential Communications Group	Cesar Chavez (OIC)	September 5, 2024 – March 1, 2025	
Presidential Communications Group	Jay Ruiz	March 1, 2025 – July 10, 2025	
Presidential Communications Group	Dave Gomez	July 10, 2025 – October 12, 2026	
Presidential Communications Group	Lino Cayetano	October 13, 2026 –	
Special Assistant to the President	Antonio Lagdameo Jr.	June 30, 2022 –	
Special Assistant to the President for Investment and Economic Affairs	Frederick Go	January 12, 2024 (Note: Served as Presidential Adviser on Investment and Economic Affairs from January 30, 2023 to January 12, 2024.) –November 17, 2025	

== Presidential order for courtesy resignations ==
On May 22, 2025, President Bongbong Marcos called for the "courtesy resignation of all Cabinet secretaries". This decision was made in proprietary measures following the administration's significant poor performance in the 2025 midterm elections which saw only half of Marcos' slate in the senate be elected.

== Changes ==
=== 2022 ===
Name	Position	Agency/Department	Date	Replaced by
Ernesto Adobo Jr. (OIC)	Secretary	Department of Environment and Natural Resources	July 12, 2022	Toni Yulo-Loyzaga
Vic Rodriguez	Executive Secretary	Office of the President of the Philippines	September 27, 2022	Chief Justice Lucas Bersamin (Ret.)
Trixie Cruz-Angeles	Press Secretary	Presidential Communications Group	October 4, 2022	Cheloy Garafil
Erwin Tulfo	Secretary	Department of Social Welfare and Development	December 23, 2022	Eduardo Punay (OIC)

=== 2023 ===
Name	Position	Agency/Department	Date	Replaced by
Jose Faustino Jr. (OIC)	Secretary	Department of National Defense	January 9, 2023	Carlito Galvez Jr. (OIC)
Clarita Carlos	National Security Adviser	National Security Council	January 14, 2023	Eduardo Año
Eduardo Punay (OIC)	Secretary	Department of Social Welfare and Development	January 31, 2023	Rex Gatchalian
Zenaida Angping	Chief	Presidential Management Staff	January 2023	Elaine T. Masukat
Carlito Galvez Jr.	Presidential Adviser on Peace, Reconciliation and Unity	Office of the Presidential Adviser on Peace, Reconciliation and Unity	February 23, 2023	Isidro Purisima (Acting)
Carlito Galvez Jr. (OIC)	Secretary	Department of National Defense	June 5, 2023	Gilbert Teodoro
Maria Rosario Vergeire (OIC)	Secretary	Department of Health	June 5, 2023	Ted Herbosa
Isidro Purisima (Acting)	Presidential Adviser on Peace, Reconciliation and Unity	Office of the Presidential Adviser on Peace, Reconciliation and Unity	June 23, 2023	Carlito Galvez Jr.
Susan Ople	Secretary	Department of Migrant Workers	August 22, 2023	Hans Leo Cacdac
Bongbong Marcos	Secretary	Department of Agriculture	November 3, 2023	Francisco Tiu Laurel Jr.

=== 2024 ===
Name	Position	Agency/Department	Date	Replaced by
Benjamin Diokno	Secretary	Department of Finance	January 12, 2024	Ralph Recto
Sara Duterte	Secretary	Department of Education	July 19, 2024	Sonny Angara
Alfredo E. Pascual	Secretary	Department of Trade and Industry	August 2, 2024	Maria Cristina Aldeguer-Roque
Cheloy V. Garafil	Secretary	Presidential Communications Office	September 5, 2024	Usec. Cesar Chavez (Acting)
Benhur Abalos	Secretary	Department of the Interior and Local Government	October 7, 2024	Jonvic Remulla

=== 2025 ===
Name	Position	Agency/Department	Date	Replaced by
Jaime Bautista	Secretary	Department of Transportation	February 21, 2025	Vince Dizon
Cesar Chavez (Acting)	Secretary	Presidential Communications Office	February 28, 2025	Jay Ruiz
Ivan John Uy	Secretary	Department of Information and Communications Technology	March 10, 2025	Paul Mercado (Acting)
Paul Mercado (Acting)	Secretary	Department of Information and Communications Technology	March 20, 2025	Henry Aguda
Toni Yulo-Loyzaga	Secretary	Department of Environment and Natural Resources	May 23, 2025	Raphael Lotilla
Raphael Lotilla	Secretary	Department of Energy	May 23, 2025	Sharon Garin
Jose Rizalino L. Acuzar	Secretary	Department of Human Settlements and Urban Development	May 23, 2025	Engr. Jose Ramon P. Aliling
Menardo Guevarra	Secretary	Solicitor General of the Philippines	May 29, 2025	Darlene Berberabe
Enrique Manalo	Secretary	Department of Foreign Affairs	July 1, 2025	Tess Lazaro
Jay Ruiz	Secretary	Presidential Communications Office	July 10, 2025	Dave Gomez
Manuel Bonoan	Secretary	Department of Public Works and Highways	September 3, 2025	Vince Dizon
Vince Dizon	Secretary	Department of Transportation	September 3, 2025	Giovanni Lopez (Acting)
Jesus Crispin Remulla	Secretary	Department of Justice	October 10, 2025	Fredderick Vida (Acting)
Juan Ponce Enrile	Chief	Chief Presidential Legal Counsel	November 13, 2025	Anna Liza Logan
Lucas Bersamin	Executive Secretary	Executive Secretary (Philippines)	November 17, 2025	Ralph Recto
Amenah Pangandaman	Secretary	Department of Budget and Management	November 17, 2025	Rolando Toledo

=== 2026 ===
Name	Position	Agency/Department	Date	Replaced by
Raphael Lotilla	Secretary	Department of Environment and Natural Resources	February 27, 2026	Juan Miguel T. Cuna
Christina Frasco	Secretary	Department of Tourism	March 12, 2026	Verna Buensuceso (OIC)
Verna Buensuceso (OIC)	Secretary	Department of Tourism	April 9, 2026	Dita Angara-Mathay
Sec. Eduardo Año	National Security Adviser	National Security Council	April 15, 2026	Eduardo SL Oban Jr.
Sec. Carlito Galvez Jr.	Presidential Adviser on Peace, Reconciliation, and Unity	Office of the Presidential Adviser on Peace, Reconciliation and Unity	April 21, 2026	Mel Senen Sarmiento
Rolando Toledo (Acting)	Secretary	Department of Budget and Management	May 19, 2026	Kim Robert de Leon
Bienvenido Laguesma	Secretary	Department of Labor and Employment	May 25, 2026	Francis Tolentino (Acting)
Ted Herbosa	Secretary	Department of Health	July 13, 2026	Jose Pujalte Jr. (Ad interim)
Jose Pujalte Jr. (Ad interim)	Secretary	Department of Health	August 10, 2026	Edwin Mercado (Ad interim)
Dave M. Gomez (Ad interim)	Secretary of the Presidential Communications Office	Presidential Communications Office	October 13, 2026	Lino Cayetano (Ad interim)
Henry Rhoel R. Aguda	Secretary of Information and Communications Technology	Department of Information and Communications Technology	October 13, 2026	Robert Joseph M. De Claro (Ad interim)
Vince Dizon (Acting)	Secretary of Public Works and Highways	Department of Public Works and Highways	October 26, 2026	Giovanni Z. Lopez (Ad interim)
Giovanni Z. Lopez (Acting)	Secretary of Transportation	Department of Transportation	October 26, 2026	Vince Dizon (Ad interim)
