= National Power Corporation =

Government-owned power generator company in the Philippines

- Pambansang Korporasyon sa Elektrisidad (Filipino)

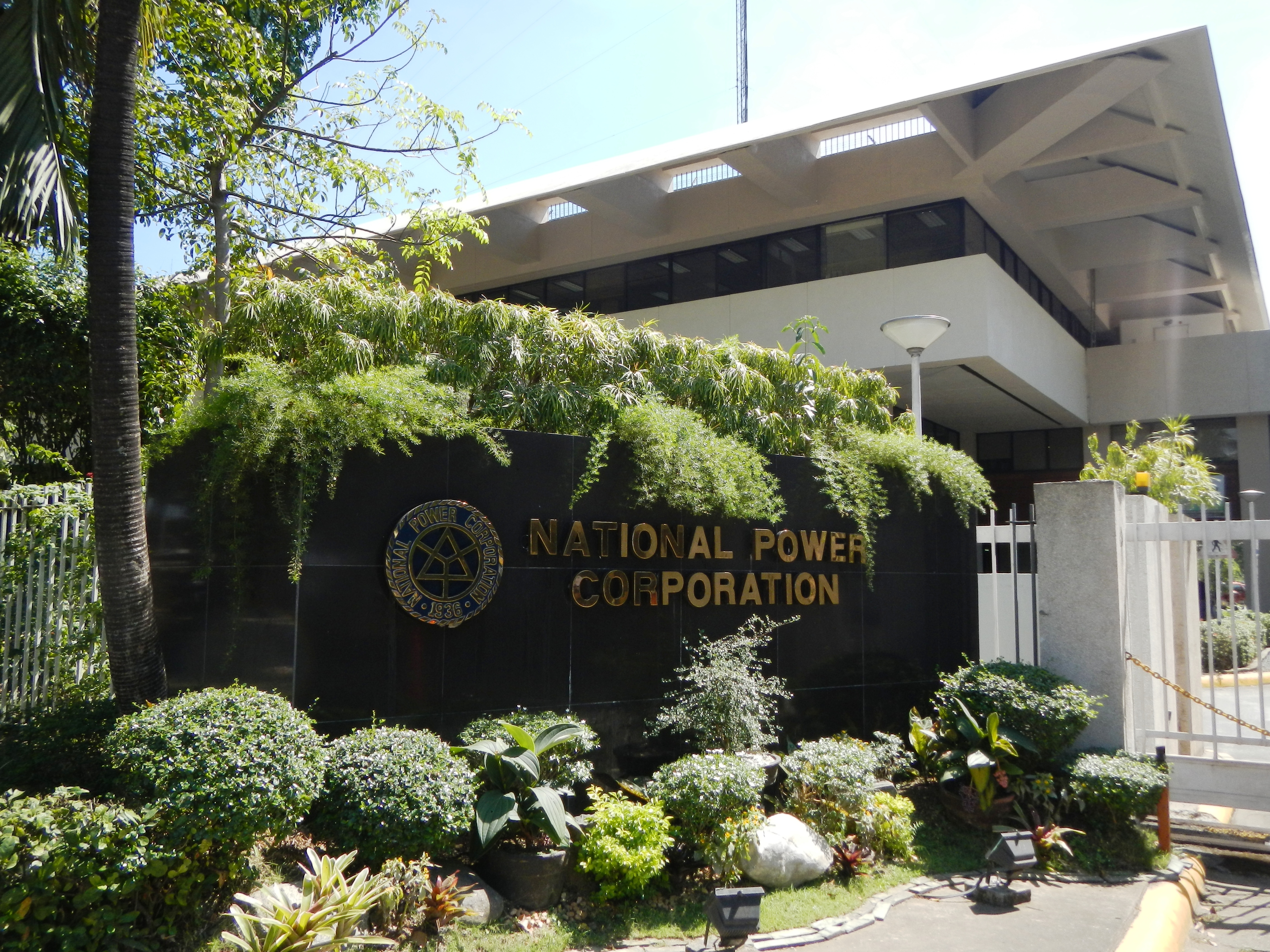
- Corporate headquarters in Diliman, Quezon City

Agency overview
- Formed: November 3, 1936; 90 years ago
- Headquarters: Power Center, Quezon Avenue corner Senator Miriam P. Defensor-Santiago Avenue (BIR Road), Diliman, Quezon City 1100, Metro Manila, Philippines
- Agency executives: Frederick Go (Chairman); Raphael Lotilla (Vice Chairman); Jericho B. Nograles (President and CEO)
- Parent department: Department of Energy
- Child agency: National Transmission Corporation (formerly; June 26, 2001 – March 1, 2003)
- Website: www.napocor.gov.ph

The National Power Corporation (NAPOCOR or NPC; Filipino: Pambansang Korporasyon sa Elektrisidad) is a Philippine government-owned and controlled corporation that is mandated to provide electricity to all rural areas of the Philippines by 2025 (known as "missionary electrification"), to manage water resources for power generation, and to optimize the use of other power generating assets.

Prior to the effectivity of the Electric Power Industry Reform Act (EPIRA) law or Republic Act No. 9136 on March 1, 2003 two years after its June 8, 2001 approval by President Gloria Macapagal Arroyo that deregulated the power industry by turning over NAPOCOR's operations, maintenance, and ownership of the Philippine power grid to another government-owned corporation National Transmission Corporation (TransCo) on March 1, 2003 as mandated on the said law that organized the industry into four sectors: generation, transmission, distribution, and supply, NAPOCOR was a vertically integrated power utility engaged in the production, transmission and distribution of electric power, used to be the largest provider and generator of electricity in the Philippines, and served as the operator and owner of the country's power grid and its related assets and facilities from its creation on November 3, 1936 to March 1, 2003, with TransCo as its then child agency from June 26, 2001 to March 2003. It was also the principal power provider for Manila Electric Company (Meralco), the only power distributor in the Metro Manila area and its nearby provinces (including all towns or cities such as Santo Tomas, Batangas on some of their respective provinces that cover the Meralco franchise).

NAPOCOR used to be the country's largest corporation in terms of revenue. Profitability however is a main concern now because it is in the business of missionary electrification that provides electricity to far-flung, off-grid remote areas and islands at subsidized rates. As a government owned and controlled corporation, NAPOCOR is subject to the scrutiny of the Commission on Audit (COA) and the Governance Commission for Government Owned and Controlled Corporations (GCG). It also manages 17 large dams and 11 watersheds in the country and continues to oversee the privatization of the government's remaining undisposed power assets. As of December 2015, NAPOCOR has a total of 1,735 megawatts (MW) of generating capacity, which includes 345 MW of small generators in small islands and off-grid locations and 1,390 MW in hydroelectric power plants and independent power producing plants in the main grids.

== History ==
=== Creation ===
The National Power Corporation was originally organized as a non-stock, public corporation under Commonwealth Act No. 120 approved by President Manuel L. Quezon on November 3, 1936. The law nationalized the hydroelectric industry and reserved for the use of NPC, all streams, lakes and springs in the Philippines where power may be developed, subject to existing rights. In 1960, under Republic Act No. 2641, it was converted into a wholly government-owned stock corporation with a capitalization of ₱100 million.

=== Revising the Charter ===
The authorized capital stock was increased to ₱250 million under Republic Act No. 3043 passed on June 17, 1961, and was further increased to ₱300 million under Republic Act No. 4897 approved on June 17, 1967. A major event in the corporate existence of the NPC was the passage on September 9, 1971, of Republic Act. No. 6395 which gave birth to a revised charter for NPC. Under the revised charter, the activities and functions of the corporation were decentralized and carried out by three regional offices to be established in Luzon, Visayas and Mindanao. The charter, likewise, extended the corporate life of NPC up to the year 2036.

=== NPC placed in charge of electrifying the Philippines ===
With the government's aim of promoting the economic welfare of the country through the attainment of total electrification, especially in rural areas, Presidential Decree No. 40 was issued on November 7, 1972, for the setting up of island grids with central/linked-up generating facilities and cooperatives for the distribution of power. The NPC, as the authorized implementing agency of the state, was entrusted with the responsibility of setting up transmission line grids and the construction of associated generating facilities in Luzon, Mindanao, and major islands of the country, including the Visayas.

In January 1974, President Ferdinand Marcos issued Presidential Decree No. 380 placing the NPC directly under the Office of the President. The move was intended to make the NPC a more efficient implementing arm of the government in the conservation and utilization of water resources and in the total electrification of the country. The Decree further boosted NPC's capitalization to ₱2 billion and its principal indebtedness, exclusive of interest, to ₱3 billion.

In December 1975, pursuant to the continuing effort of the President to make the government machinery more attuned and responsive to the needs of the service and of the people, the President decided to attach the NPC to the Department of Public Works, Transportation and Communication (now Department of Public Works and Highways). The transfer was effected by Letter of Implementation No.31 dated December 11, 1975, pursuant to Presidential Decree No.830 dated November 27, 1975, which extends ‘flexible and continuing authority to the President to restructure the Office of the President.”

=== Increasing capitalisation ===
The presidential action giving added impetus to the corporation in the implementation of its power development program is embodied in Presidential Decree No. 938 issued on May 27, 1976, which further increased NPC's capitalization to ₱8 billion and its principal indebtedness to ₱12 billion. It also authorized NPC to contract foreign loans of up to U$4 billion. Incurring massive amounts of foreign debt was partially justified by the desire to pursue nuclear power. Marcos requested that National Power Co. (the government owned electric utility) negotiate a deal to buy two nuclear reactors.

Two proposals were submitted by General Electric and Westinghouse Electric Corporations. General Electric submitted a proposal containing detailed specification of the nuclear plant with estimated cost of US$700 million. On the other hand, Westinghouse submitted a lower estimated cost of US$650 million but the proposal did not contain any detail and specification. The presidential committee tasked to oversee the project preferred General Electric's proposal but this was overruled in June 1974 by Marcos, who signed a letter of intent awarding the project to Westinghouse, despite the absence of any specification and details on their proposal. Similarly, Marcos disregarded wishes and advice of the National Power Corporation, the government-owned and controlled corporation responsible for electricity in the country. Marcos's decision was driven by the low cost earlier proposed by Westinghouse. Also Westinghouse used connections to strike the deal. But by March 1975 after the contract was awarded, Westinghouse's cost estimate ballooned to US$1.2 billion without much explanation. The final construction cost reached to $2.2 billion for a single reactor producing half the power of the original proposal. Many problems identified in earlier stages remained throughout construction, as reported by inspectors, though all these were denied by Westinghouse to save their company's image.

On October 6, 1977, with the creation of the Department of Energy under Presidential Decree No. 1206, the NPC was attached to the new department for purposes of policy coordination and integration with sectoral programs.

President Marcos increased the capitalization of NPC to ₱50 billion, thus the Government holds 50 billion over Total Principal Capital, percents and share. The record-setting action was made through the issuance of Presidential Decree No. 1360 on April 24, 1978, which effectively established the NPC as the biggest corporation in the country.

The increase in capitalization is expected to afford a greater degree of corporate flexibility in the implementation of the countrywide power programs and corporation management. In a simultaneous development, the president appointed Gabriel Y. Itchon as Deputy Minister of Energy and concurrently president and chief executive officer of the National Power Corporation, the first ever to be appointed in such capacity in the then 43-year history of the corporation. Under P.D. No. 1360, the designation of president replaced that of the general manager as head of the office. Along with the appointment of Itchon as NPC president were the appointments of top management men to the positions of senior vice president, vice president, and department manager as part of the reorganization move to make the corporation more responsive and attuned to the needs of the service and the demands of the times.

=== Take-over of Meralco ===
In November 1972, when the President issued Presidential Decree No. 40, the National Power Corporation was authorized "to own and operate, as a single integrated system, all generating facilities supplying electric power to the entire area embraced by any grid set up by NPC." Contemplated to be integrated in the system were all Meralco generating units, and thus began a long drawn-out negotiation for the sale and turnover of these units to the government at terms and conditions supposedly acceptable to all parties.

On June 11, 1978, the government and Meralco agreed on the purchase of the latter's power-generating units at a total cost of ₱1,100 million. The contract was signed by Finance Minister Cesar E.A. Virata, representing the government, and Cesar C. Zalamea, chairman of Meralco, with Energy Minister and NP Board Chairman Geronimo Z. Velasco, Energy Deputy Minister and NPC President Gabriel Y. Itchon, IBP Assemblyman Emilio M. Abelo, Sr. and Meralco Treasurer Antonio Ozaeta as witnesses.

The government purchase of the thermal plants of Meralco was in line with the NPC policy to centralize all generating capacities in Luzon under its operations as part of the unification of the so-called Luzon grid. Such centralization is aimed at providing energy throughout the Philippines and building up additional generating capacity for electricity in pursuance of the government objective of total electrification of the country.

Meralco units covered by the initial sale are those of Malaya 1 in Pililla, Rizal; Gardners 1 and II and Synders 1 and II in Sucat, Muntinlupa, and fuel storage facilities in San Pascual, Batangas. Negotiations for the Meralco sale began in 1975 when Meralco approached the government for assistance in view of financial problems that made it difficult for Meralco to meet its huge debt service requirements. Consequently, an inter-agency government panel was formed to conduct valuation studies.

On August 11, 1975, the first memorandum agreement between the government and Meralco was signed by then Executive Secretary Alejandro B. Melchor, Jr. and former Meralco Chairman Emilio M. Abello, Sr. Through the years, the composition of the government panel underwent several changes brought about by retirements from service, shifts in assignments and appointments of technical men. Representations for NPC started with Ramon R. Ravanzo in 1975, then to Conrado D. del Rosario later that year, and on to President Gabriel Y. Itchon.

The historic EDSA revolution in February 1986 swept Corazon C. Aquino into power becoming the first woman president in Asia. In 1986, NPC President Gabriel Y. Itchon retired from the government service. President Aquino appointed former NPC General Manager Conrado D. del Rosario as the new NPC president who assumed office from May 1986 to November 1987. Del Rosario was replaced by Ernesto M. Aboitiz when the latter was appointed by President Aquino as NPC president in November 1987. At the same time, Meralco returned to Lopez Family ownership as the government removed it from NPC control.

=== NPC takes over other power generators ===
The most significant achievement of NPC in 1988 was the signing of a memorandum of agreement with the National Electrification Administration (NEA) for the takeover by NPC of the generation facilities of electrical cooperatives in the remote islands of the archipelago. President Aquino's directive pegged electricity rates nationwide to no more than ₱2.50 per kilowatt-hour and impelled NPC to take over the electricity production activities of cooperatives in the small islands and isolated areas.

As of April 1991, the NPC has taken over the generation facilities and technical operation of various electric cooperatives of 26 remote islands of the archipelago. Fully supportive of the government's policy of encouraging private sector investments, the NPC has finalized in 1989 for private investors to participate in electric power generation through schemes such as co-generation, Build Operate Transfer (BOT), and Build Own Operate (BOO). This directive bolsters the national policy of encouraging active private sector involvement in the major economic activities of the country, recognizing that the private sector can be a partner in nation-building.

=== Increase in generator capacity ===
In addition, proposals from various BOT and BOO proponents were entertained in 1988 and in early part of 1989. This culminated in the signing by end-1988 of a BOT agreement between the NPC and Hopewell Energy Management Limited of Hong Kong for the Installation of the two 110-megawatt turbine plants in Luzon. Gas turbines have been favored over conventional power plants due to their simplicity in construction, quick start capability, and ease of connection to the power grid and shorter installation period. The ultimate goal of NPC was to achieve the total electrification before the 21st century. For such ambitious plan, NPC envisioned the interconnection of all-independent grids in Luzon, Visayas and Mindanao through the advanced system of overhead lines and submarine cables. In 1990, the Negros-panay interconnection project was finally put into operation. The 18.3 km (11.4 mi) submarine cables interconnecting the two islands enable NPC to utilize the excess steam from the Palimpinon Geothermal power plant in Negros. The project is part of the master plan to develop an electric superhighway for the entire country. The major component of this project is the interconnection of the Luzon grid to Leyte where the large steam field of Tongonan is located.

Hand-in-hand with its efforts of ensuring the efficient power service, NPC endeavoured to assist in the development of the communities situated in areas where its power plants and transmission line facilities are located. On June 13, 1991, Pablo V. Malixi was appointed by President Corazon C. Aquino as the fourth president of the corporation replacing Ernesto M. Aboitiz who was named chairman of the National Power Board.

In the same year, the National Power Corporation installed and commissioned 11 gas turbine units throughout the country to meet the urgent power supply deficiencies, caused by an extended dry spell. In addition, the state-owned power firm installed 768 diesel generator sets (with a total capacity of 19.7 KW) to serve the consumers in isolated islands – in line with NPC's mission to bring the benefits of electricity to the farthest corners of the country. There was a change in NPC corporate leadership in 1993. Dr. Francisco L. Viray was named new NPC president. He took his oath of office on May 18, 1993, at Malacañang with President Fidel V. Ramos himself administering the oath.

In September 1994, just 17 months after, there was another change in the corporate leadership. Guido Alfredo A. Delgado, a banker, assumed the post of NPC president at oath taking rites held in Malacañang on September 28. Delgado is the sixth president, and at 36, the youngest to assume the headship of NPC. He succeeded Dr. Viray who was designated Secretary of energy, vice former NP Board Chairman Delfin L. Lazaro who opted to retire from government service. NPC concluded the year 1995 with a total generating capacity of 9,507 megawatts (MW), a 4.84% rise from the 1995 figure of 9,068 MW. This was due to the commissioning of a number of power plants during the year by NPC and by independent power producers. Likewise, a total of 312 circuit km (195 miles) of new transmission lines were put up all over the country.

NPC's energy production rose to 33,296 gigawatt hours (GWh) in 1995, an 8.7% growth over a year-ago figures, while energy sales grew by 7.9% to 31,031 GWh. This expansion in production and sales matched the rising demand for power during the year which rose by 10.68% to 5,328 MW. In 1996, NPC commissioned the 10-kilowatt wind turbine power plant. In addition, the 700-mega Pagbilao coal-fired power plant built by Hopewell under the Build-Operate-Transfer scheme is commissioned into operation.

On September 19, 2008, Energy Secretary Angelo Reyes confirmed the September 8 resignation for health reasons, of incumbent Napocor president Cyril del Callar, effective on September 30. Eduardo Ermita, on September 22, formally announced the appointment of Power Sector Assets and Liabilities Management Corp. (Psalm) officer Froilan Tampinco as the new NPC head. On August 1, 2013, President Benigno Aquino III appointed the first-ever woman president of NPC, Ms Ma. Gladys Cruz-Sta.Rita. On April 1, 2017, President Rodrigo Duterte appointed Pio J. Benavidez, replacing Ms. Glady Cruz-Sta. Rita.

=== National Power under the EPIRA ===
The effectivity of the Republic Act No. 9136 or the Electric Power Industry Reform Act of 2001 on March 1, 2003 has changed the Philippine energy landscape. National Power is no longer the same corporate entity, with the EPIRA mandating the privatization of its generation and transmission assets, save for those necessary for missionary electrification.

EPIRA law also established another government-owned corporation named National Transmission Corporation (TransCo) 18 days after the law was approved on June 26, 2001 which was initially a child agency of NPC from the said date of June 2001 until the latter turned over the operations, maintenance, and ownership of the country's transmission facilities and assets to TransCo upon the law's effectivity in March 2003, making the former now a standalone government agency separate from NPC since then, as it is mandated that the industry is organized into four sectors: generation, transmission, distribution and supply. In 2012, National Power reported a net income of ₱398 million.

==== Small Power Utilities Group ====
Through its Small Power Utilities Group (NPC-SPUG), National Power continues to pursue its mandate to provide electricity in off-grid areas, particularly in areas where private investors hesitate to come in due to lack of infrastructure and political and security concerns. In 2008, National Power installed diesel power plants in the following areas: Cuyo, Palawan (500 kW); (2) Siasi, Sulu (1,000 kW); (3) Power Barge 109 in Tablas, Romblon (1,000 kW) and uprated 3 DPPs in Marinduque. It installed transmission lines in Occidental Mindoro and Catanduanes and completed four substation projects in Palawan and Catanduanes. The following year, NPC was able to install 12,718 kW of new capacities in 34 SPUG areas nationwide, from as far north as Cagayan down to Basilan and Sultan Kudarat in southern Philippines. It also constructed 154 diesel-fired mini grids in 102 barangays in Masbate under the Philippine Rural Electrification System (“PRES”) project; energizing 4,394 households in 46 barangays in Masbate, Camarines Sur, Cagayan, Antique and Guimaras by putting up 1,052 kW in new capacity. This was done in support of the DOE's Rural Area Electrification Subsidy (RAES) program which was aimed at providing basic electricity service in remote barangays through solar home systems, PV battery charging stations, micro-hydro, wind energy, diesel and hybrid facilities. In 2010, NPC was able to install only 6,528 kW in new capacity mainly because of serious budgetary constraints. But it was able to complete the PRES project in Masbate, with all of the 154 power plants and 5,219 solar home systems installed and in commercial operation. As a result, NPC was able to light up 18,000 homes in 128 barangays located in 14municipalities in Masbate.

In 2011, NPC installed 4,365 kW in new capacity in Batanes, Western Samar, Basilan and Sultan Kudarat. In 2012, the company installed a total of 14,186 kW of new and augmentation capacities in 21 different power plants and areas nationwide. A 560 kW genset was added to Burias DPP in Masbate in September 2012. In October 2012, a 600 kW genset was also added to Casiguran DPP in Aurora and 2 x 500 kW genset at Viga DPP in Catanduanes. In Masbate, six new mini grids with an aggregate capacity of 420 kW started commercial operation in the second half of 2012. In Samar, households in five areas of three municipalities in Western Samar likewise enjoyed electricity for the first time starting May 2012; aggregate capacity installed was 306 kW. As a remedial measure to cope with the power demand in eight SPUG areas with aging gensets, National Power resorted to a short-to-medium-term (one to two years) genset rental. This was implemented to lessen the effect of power shortages in areas whose power plants have aging gensets. In 2012, a total of 11,300 kW of additional rented capacity was installed in 8 Diesel Power Plants in Batanes, Aurora, Palawan, Romblon, Masbate, Siquijor, Basilan, and Sulu.

==== Watershed and dams management ====
National Power continues to fulfill its mandate to manage the 11 watersheds and 22 dams under its stewardship. From 2008 up to 2012, NPC was able to rehabilitate a total of 2,608 hectares (6,440 acres) in its watershed areas, mainly through reforestation and agro-forestry initiatives. It continues to play a role in supporting the government's drive towards climate change mitigation. At the same time, NPC continuously updates its dam safety protocols and flood control programs in keeping with international best practices.

== Organization ==
Below is a table listing the officials of NAPOCOR which are appointed by the President of the Philippines with the consent of the Commission on Appointments (CA). The NAPOCOR organization consists of president and CEO serving as head of the government agency, secretaries of Departments of Finance, Energy, Environment and Natural Resources, Interior and Local Government, Budget and Management, Trade and Industry and Agriculture, with DOF secretary serving as ex officio chairman and DOE secretary as ex officio vice chairman, Director-General of National Economic and Development Authority, Corporate Secretary and Compliance Officer, and Head of the Internal Audit Department, forming the government agency's board of directors known as the National Power Board.

Name	Position	Credentials
Frederick D. Go	Chairman	Secretary, Department of Finance
Sharon S. Garin	Vice Chairman	Secretary, Department of Energy
Jericho B. Nograles	Director, President and CEO	Full Professor of Asian Institute of Management (AIM) in Makati, Executive Director of Dr. Andrew L. Tan Center for Tourism, Member of Rules Change Committee and Market Surveillance Committee of Philippine Electricity Market Corporation, Managing Director of Green Square Properties Inc., Senior Advisor of Integrated Energy Database and Marginal Abatement Cost Curve for the Philippines, USAID, Advisor of Updating - Philippine Sector Assessment, Strategy & Roadrnap, Financial & Economic Analysis, Philippine Energy Efficiency Project Evaluation and Financial & Economic Analysis, Project Completion Report Electricity Market and Transmission Development Project, Asian Development Bank, Independent Evaluator of JICA Ex-Post Evaluation FY2009, Package 16, Northern Negros Geothermal Project, OPMAC - Japan International Cooperation Agency, Independent Evaluator of JICA Ex-Post Evaluation FY2007, Luzon Grid Transmission Project, OPMAC - Japan International Cooperation Agency, Consultant of Assessment of the Philippine Power Sector Issues & Challenges: Recommended ADB Assistance Strategy, Asian Development Bank, Consultant of Clean Technology Fund & Country Investment Plan, World Bank/ Asian Development Bank, Advisor of Philippine Economic Zone Authority, PEZAJUSAID, Advisor of Office of the Energy Secretary funded by USAID/PA Consulting, Consultant of Energy Sector Profile & Roadmap Project, Asian Development Bank, Consultant of Operations Review, Power Sector Lending Portfolio, Asian Development Bank, Consultant of Power Supply Strategy Options for Malls. Private Client, Consultant of Assessment of Power Supply Alternatives for Siquijor Island, Deutsche Gesellscbaft fiir Technische Zusammenarbeit GmbH (German: German Agency for Technical Cooperation), Consultant of Missionary Electrification Development Plan. World Bank/Department of Energy, Technical Advisor of Energy Regulatory Commission funded by P A Consulting, Privatization & Restructuring Advisor (2001). Advisor for the Implementing Rules and Regulations (IRR) for the Power Reform Act (RA 9136), Department of Energy, funded by PA Consulting
Raphael P.M. Lotilla	Director	Secretary, Department of Environment and Natural Resources
Jonvic Remulla	Director	Secretary, Department of the Interior and Local Government
Rolando Toledo	Director	Secretary, Department of Budget and Management
Cristina Aldeguer-Roque	Director	Secretary, Department of Trade and Industry
Arsenio Balisacan	Director	Director-General, National Economic and Development Authority
Francisco Tiu Laurel Jr.	Director	Secretary, Department of Agriculture
Atty. Patrick D. Mabbagu	Director	Corporate Secretary and Compliance Officer
Vedalisa N. Arevalo	Director	Head, Internal Audit Department

== See also ==
- List of Philippine companies
- National Transmission Corporation
- National Grid Corporation of the Philippines
