= Kim Robert de Leon =

Filipino academic and bureaucrat

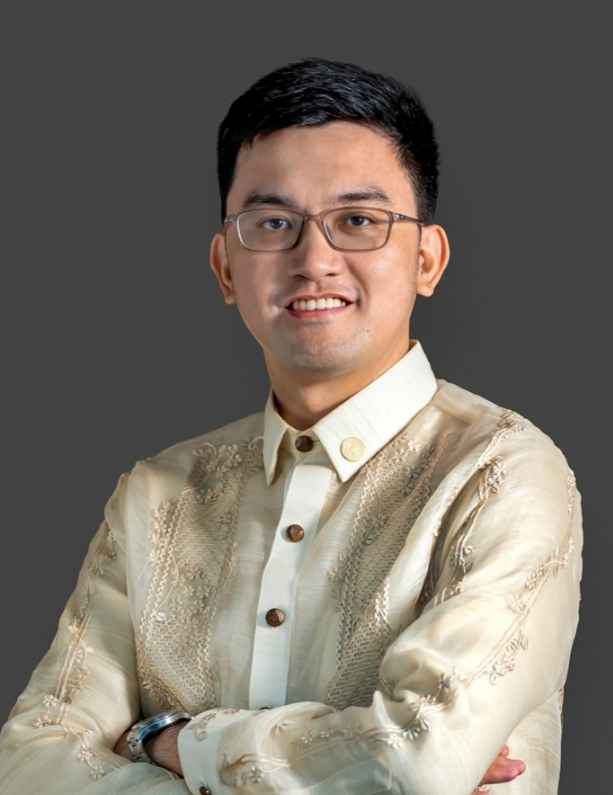
- Official Portrait, 2026

Secretary of Budget and Management
- Ad interim
- Assumed office May 19, 2026
- President: Bongbong Marcos
- Preceded by: Amenah Pangandaman; Rolando Toledo (acting)

Undersecretary for Administration and Finance of the Department of Transportation
- In office July 2022 – January 2024
- President: Bongbong Marcos

Undersecretary of the Department of Budget and Management
- In office September 2021 – July 2022
- President: Rodrigo Duterte; Bongbong Marcos

Personal details
- Born: Kim Robert Cuevas de Leon; January 18, 1994 (age 32) Navotas, Philippines
- Education: University of the Philippines Diliman (BPA; MA); Philippine Public Safety College (MPSA); Queensland University of Technology (PGCert)
- Occupation: Academic; bureaucrat

Kim Robert Cuevas de Leon (born 1993 or 1994) is a Filipino academic and bureaucrat who has served as the ad interim Secretary of Budget and Management since 2026. He previously held executive positions at the Department of Budget and Management and Department of Transportation.

A graduate of the University of the Philippines Diliman, de Leon is a professor of public administration and has taught at his alma mater.

== Early life and education ==
De Leon is a native of Navotas. Since his elementary education, he has been active with the city's program for the Boy Scouts of the Philippines, earning three awards from the organization: Bronze in 2017, Silver in 2019, and Gold in 2021.

De Leon studied at the UP National College of Public Administration and Governance at the University of the Philippines Diliman, where he earned his Bachelor of Public Administration in 2014, graduating magna cum laude and as valedictorian of his college. While at college, he lobbied for the passage of the Navotas Youth Code, which established the Navotas City Council for Youth Development.

In 2016, De Leon earned a rating of 83.50% at the Environmental Planning Licensure Exam, emerging as the topnotcher for that year. He later obtained a Master of Arts in Urban and Regional Planning in the same university then and a Master of Public Safety Administration degree from the Philippine Public Safety College.In 2021, he obtained a Postgraduate Certificate in Business Process Management from the Queensland University of Technology, studying under the Australia Awards Scholarship Program.

== Career ==
In September 2021, de Leon was appointed as an undersecretary at the Department of Budget and Management (DBM), leading the Organization and Systems Improvement and Information and Communications Technology Groups. Before being appointed to that position, he was serving as an assistant secretary and director IV at the same department. In July 2022, Marcos appointed him to serve at the Department of Transportation, serving as undersecretary for administration and finance under Secretary Jaime Bautista.

In August 2025, he became an assistant professor at his alma mater.

== Secretary of Budget and Management (since 2026) ==
=== Appointment ===
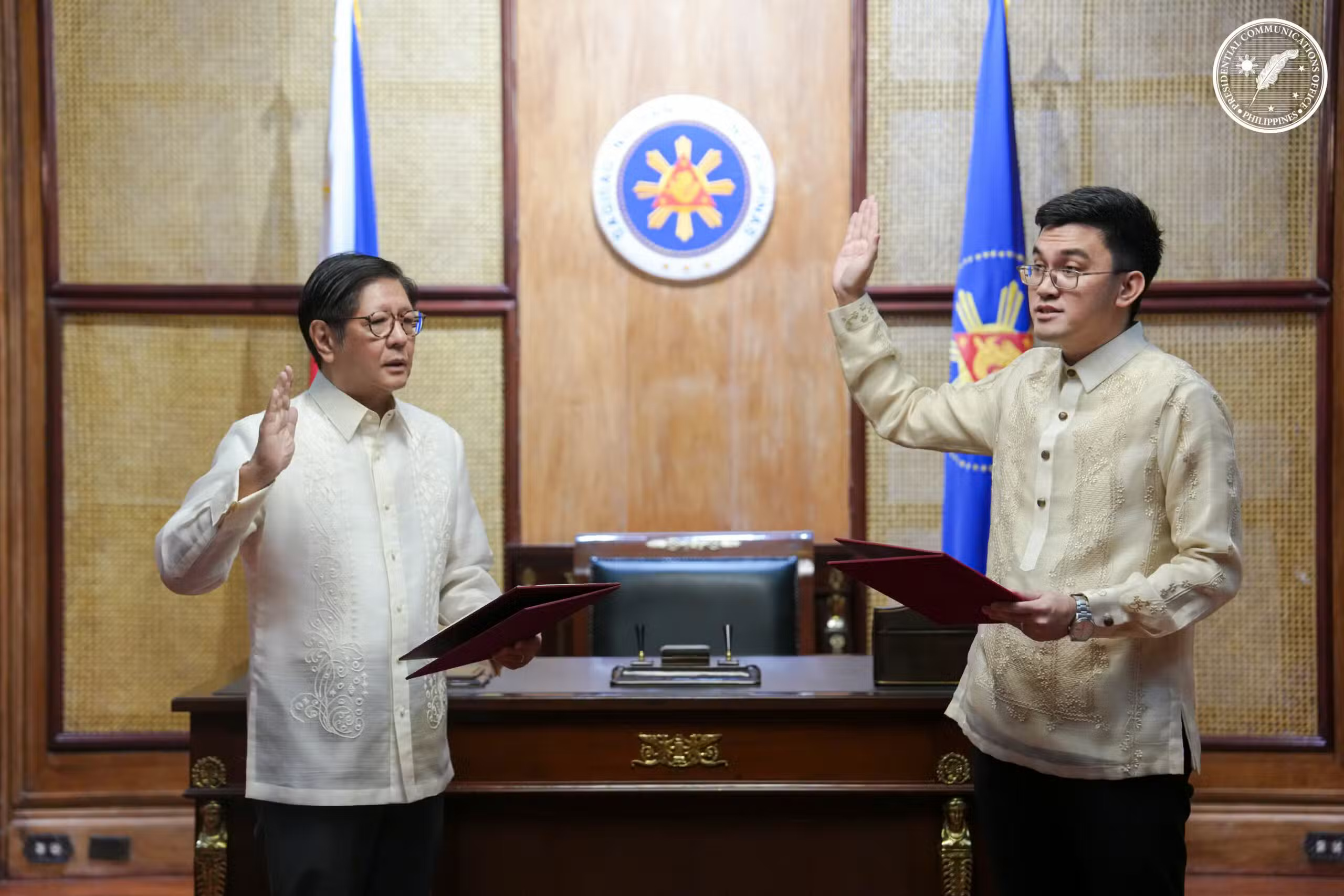
De Leon being sworn in as budget and management secretary by President Bongbong Marcos on May 29, 2026

On May 13, 2026, The Philippine Star reported that de Leon was being considered to succeed Acting Budget and Management Secretary Rolando Toledo as part of a cabinet reshuffle. Five days later, Palace Press Officer Claire Castro confirmed that President Bongbong Marcos appointed de Leon as secretary of budget and management, scheduling his swearing-in for the following day.

Appointed at age 32, he is the youngest person to be appointed to the post in the department's history, as well as youngest member of the Marcos cabinet. His appointment received a positive reception from policy experts including former representative Joey Salceda, who commended de Leon's "technical proficiency" demonstrated in his in the 2020, 2021, and 2022 national budgets.

=== Tenure ===
De Leon was sworn in on May 19, 2026. During the turnover ceremony, de Leon stated that his priorities as secretary is to "tighten oversight of government spending" and "crack down on corruption" to rebuild public confidence in the DBM, following the department's involvement in the flood control projects scandal under his predecessor.

== Personal life ==
De Leon is a philatelist. He holds the Guinness World Record for the largest collection of pope stamps, maintaining a collection of 2,398 stamps. He was conferred the award on February 22, 2024.

Political offices
Preceded by Amenah Pangandaman; Rolando Toledo (acting)	Secretary of Budget and Management; 2026–present Ad interim	Incumbent
Order of precedence
Preceded by Renato Solidum Jr. as Secretary of Science and Technology	Order of Precedence of the Philippines as Secretary of Budget and Management	Succeeded by Sharon Garin as Secretary of Energy
