= Order of precedence in the Philippines =

Relative preeminence of officials for ceremonial purposes

The order of precedence in the Philippines is the protocol used in ranking government officials and other personages in the Philippines. Purely ceremonial in nature, the order of precedence is based on custom, has no legal standing, and does not reflect the presidential line of succession nor the equal status of the three branches of government as stated in the 1987 Constitution.

== Order of government officials of the Philippines ==
1. HE The President (Bongbong Marcos)
2. HE The Vice President (Sara Duterte)
3. Living former Presidents of the Philippines:
  1. Joseph Estrada (30 June 1998 to 20 January 2001)
  2. Gloria Macapagal Arroyo (20 January 2001 to 30 June 2010)
  3. Rodrigo Duterte (30 June 2016 to 30 June 2022)
4. President of the Senate (Sherwin Gatchalian)
5. Speaker of the House of Representatives (Bojie Dy)
6. Chief Justice of the Philippines (Alexander Gesmundo)
7. Secretary of Foreign Affairs (Tess Lazaro)
8. Foreign Ambassadors Extraordinary and Plenipotentiary (in order of presentation of their credentials, with the Apostolic Nuncio as the diplomatic corps' traditional primus inter pares)
  1. Dean of the Diplomatic Corps (Charles John Brown)
9. Executive Secretary (Ralph Recto) (Ad interim)
10. Secretary of Finance (Frederick Go) (Ad interim)
11. Secretary of Justice (Fredderick Vida) (acting)
12. Secretary of Agriculture (Francisco Tiu Laurel Jr.)
13. Secretary of Public Works and Highways (Vince Dizon) (Ad interim)
14. Secretary of Education (Sonny Angara)
15. Secretary of Labor and Employment (Francis Tolentino) (acting)
16. Secretary of National Defense (Gilbert Teodoro)
17. Secretary of Health (Edwin Mercado) (Ad interim)
18. Secretary of Trade and Industry (Maria Cristina Aldeguer-Roque)
19. Secretary of Migrant Workers (Hans Leo Cacdac)
20. Secretary of Human Settlements and Urban Development (Jose Ramon Aliling)
21. Secretary of Social Welfare and Development (Rex Gatchalian)
22. Secretary of Agrarian Reform (Conrado Estrella III)
23. Secretary of Environment and Natural Resources (Juan Miguel Cuna) (acting)
24. Secretary of the Interior and Local Government (Jonvic Remulla)
25. Secretary of Tourism (Dita Angara-Mathay) (Ad interim)
26. Secretary of Transportation (Giovanni Lopez) (acting)
27. Secretary of Science and Technology (Renato Solidum Jr.)
28. Secretary of Budget and Management (Kim Robert de Leon) (Ad interim)
29. Secretary of Energy (Sharon Garin)
30. Secretary of Information and Communications Technology (Henry Aguda)
31. Foreign Envoys Extraordinary and Ministers Plenipotentiary
32. Secretary of Economy, Planning, and Development (Arsenio Balisacan)
33. Secretary of the Presidential Communications Office (Lino Cayetano) (Ad interim)
34. National Security Adviser and Director-General of the National Security Council (Eduardo Oban)
35. Head of the Presidential Management Staff (Elaine Masukat)
36. Solicitor-General (Darlene Berberabe)
37. Chief Presidential Legal Counsel (Anna Liza Logan)
38. Chairman of the Metropolitan Manila Development Authority (Romando Artes)
39. Chairman of the National Commission on Muslim Filipinos (Sabuddin N. Abdurahim)
40. Other Presidential Advisers with Cabinet rank
41. Members of the Senate (ordered by length of service)
42. Members of the House of Representatives (ordered by length of service)
43. Associate Justices of the Supreme Court of the Philippines
44. Heads of Constitutional Commissions
  1. Civil Service Commission (Marilyn Barua-Yap)
  2. Commission on Elections (George Garcia)
  3. Commission on Audit (Gamaliel Cordoba)
45. Members of the Council of State who are not Cabinet Members
46. Acting heads of departments and living former vice-presidents of the Philippines
  1. Living former vice-presidents of the Philippines (by seniority of assuming office):
    1. Teofisto Guingona Jr. (7 February 2001 – 30 June 2004)
    2. Noli de Castro (30 June 2004 – 30 June 2010)
    3. Jejomar Binay (30 June 2010 – 30 June 2016)
    4. Leni Robredo (30 June 2016 – 30 June 2022)
47. Undersecretaries for Foreign Affairs
  1. Undersecretary for Administration
  2. Undersecretary for International Economic Relations
  3. Undersecretary for Migrant and Workers Affairs
  4. Undersecretary for Policy
  5. Undersecretary for Special and Ocean Concerns
48. Ambassadors of the Philippines assigned to foreign posts
49. Undersecretaries of the department, including the Assistant Executive Secretaries
50. Assistant Secretaries of Departments, Directors-General and Chiefs of Mission I and II of the Department of Foreign Affairs
51. Governor of the Bangko Sentral (Eli M. Remolona, Jr.)
52. Foreign Charges d’Affaires de missi, Foreign Chargé d'Affaires ad interim
53. Mayor of the City of Manila (Isko Moreno)
54. Presiding Justice of the Court of Appeals, the President of the University of the Philippines, the Chief of Staff of the Armed Forces of the Philippines, Commissioners, or other officers with the rank of Undersecretary
  1. Presiding Justice of the Court of Appeals (Fernanda Lampas-Peralta)
  2. President of the University of the Philippines (Angelo Jimenez)
  3. Armed Forces of the Philippines Chief of Staff (Gen. Antonio Nafarrete, AFP)
55. Heads of permanent United Nations Agencies in the Philippines with the rank of Director
56. Provincial governors
57. Vice-Chief of Staff of the Armed Forces of the Philippines (Lt. Gen. Rommel P. Roldan, AFP)
58. Foreign ministers-counsellor, counsellors of embassies, consuls general, foreign military attaches with the rank of major general or rear admiral, and other officers of equivalent rank in the Armed Forces of the Philippines
59. Judges of the Regional Trial Courts
60. First secretaries of foreign embassies, foreign military attaches with the rank of brigadier general or commodore, and other officers of equivalent rank in the Armed Forces
61. Mayors of chartered cities
62. Directors or commissioners of bureaus and chiefs of offices
63. Presidents, chairpersons, and managers of government-owned and controlled corporations
64. Second secretaries and consuls of foreign embassies, foreign military attaches with the rank of colonel or lieutenant colonel, and other officers of equivalent rank in the Armed Forces of the Philippines
65. Third secretaries and vice consuls of foreign embassies, foreign military attaches with the rank of major or captain and other officers of equivalent rank in the Armed Forces of the Philippines
