= Renato Solidum Jr. =

Filipino geologist and government official

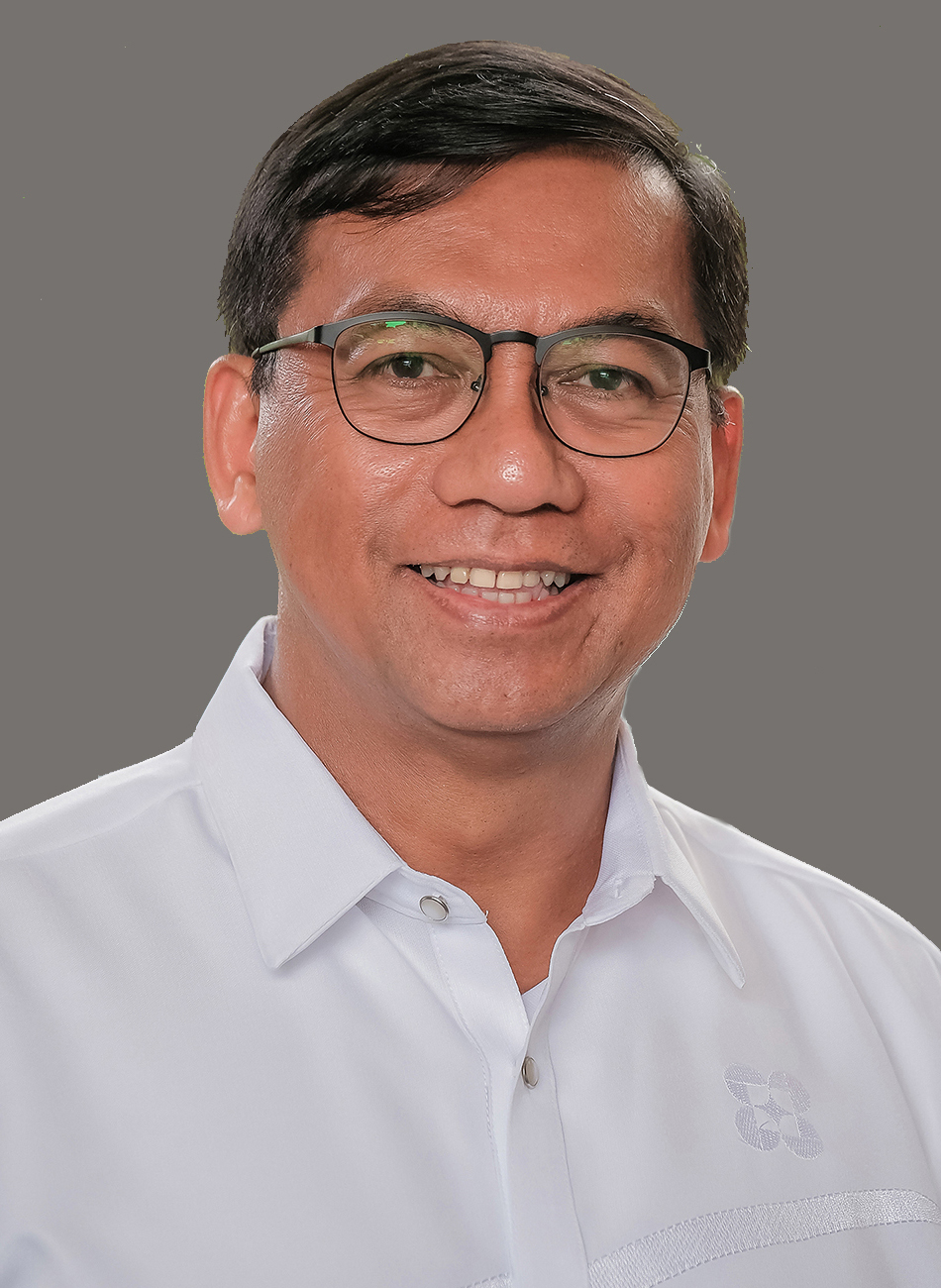
- Solidum in 2022

9th Secretary of Science and Technology
- Incumbent
- Assumed office August 13, 2022 (Note: Served as Officer in Charge of the DOST from June 30, 2022 to July 22, 2022 and as interim secretary of the DOST from July 22, 2022 to August 13, 2022.)
- President: Bongbong Marcos
- Preceded by: Fortunato de la Peña

Undersecretary for Scientific and Technical Services
- In office 2019–2022
- President: Rodrigo Duterte; Bongbong Marcos
- Succeeded by: Maridon O. Sagahun

Undersecretary for Disaster Risk Reduction Climate Change Adaptation
- In office 2017–2019
- President: Rodrigo Duterte

Director of the Philippine Institute of Volcanology and Seismology (Note: Officer in charge since 2017.)
- In office 2003–2022
- President: Gloria Macapagal Arroyo; Benigno Aquino III; Rodrigo Duterte; Bongbong Marcos
- Preceded by: Raymundo Punongbayan
- Succeeded by: Teresito Bacolcol

Personal details
- Born: Renato Umali Solidum Jr.
- Education: University of the Philippines Diliman (B.S.); University of Illinois Chicago (M.S.); University of California, San Diego (Ph.D)
- Occupation: Geologist
- Scientific career
- Fields: Geology
- Workplaces: Philippine Institute of Volcanology and Seismology

Renato Umali Solidum Jr. is a Filipino geologist and government official who has served as the ninth secretary of science and technology since 2022. Before his appointment as Secretary, Solidum served as an Undersecretary for Disaster Risk Reduction-Climate Change Adaptation at DOST and as the Officer-in-Charge of the Philippine Institute of Volcanology and Seismology (PHIVOLCS).

== Early life and education ==
Solidum is from the town of Odiongan in Romblon, where he attended high school.

Originally, Solidum wanted to be a civil engineer and took the entrance examination for University of the Philippines, though he passed the exam, he was ineligible to enroll in an engineering course as it only accepted a limited number of students each year. Instead, he enrolled in geology in UP Diliman with the intention of later switching to the engineering. However, he decided against this and earned a bachelor's degree in geology.

He also studied in the United States at the University of Illinois Chicago, where he obtained a master's degree in geological sciences. Then he earned a PhD in earth sciences at the Scripps Institution of Oceanography at the University of California, San Diego.

== Career ==
Solidum has been part of the Philippine Institute of Volcanology and Seismology (PHIVOLCS) since it split off from the Philippine Atmospheric, Geophysical, and Astronomical Services Administration (PAGASA) in 1984. He was hired shortly after graduating from the University of the Philippines, with the endorsement of then-director Raymundo Punongbayan.

He first received international attention in 1991 when PHIVOLCS director Punongbayan tasked him to work with the United States Geological Service, gathering data at the then restive Mount Pinatubo. The findings of the team led Punongbayan to raise an evacuation alert in the area prior to a major volcanic eruption, saving thousands of lives in Central Luzon.

From 2003 to 2017, he served in PHIVOLCS as its director and then Officer-in-Charge from March 2017. He was also appointed as Department of Science and Technology (DOST) Undersecretary for Disaster Risk Reduction-Climate Change Adaptation (DRR-CCA). In 2019, he became the undersecretary for Scientific and Technical Services.

President Bongbong Marcos appointed Solidum as an ad interim secretary of science and technology on July 22, 2022. On December 7, 2022, Solidum's appointment was confirmed by the Commission on Appointments.

In recognition of his contributions to disaster risk reduction in the Philippines, Solidum has received numerous awards, including:

- Presidential Lingkod Bayan (Civil Servant) Award
- Presidential Citation for Public Service
- Professional of the Year in the field of Geology by the Professional Regulation Commission
- Excellence Award for Government Service by the Philippine Federation of Professional Associations

== Personal life ==
Solidum is married and has three children.

== Notes ==
Political offices
Preceded by Raymundo Punongbayan	Director of the Philippine Institute of Volcanology and Seismology; 2003–2022	Succeeded by Teresito Bacolcol
Preceded by Fortunato de la Peña	Secretary of Science and Technology; 2022–present	Incumbent
Order of precedence
Preceded by Vince Dizon as Secretary of Transportation	Order of Precedence of the Philippines as Secretary of Science and Technology	Succeeded by Rolando Toledo as Acting Secretary of Budget and Management
