= Fredderick Vida =

Filipino lawyer and politician

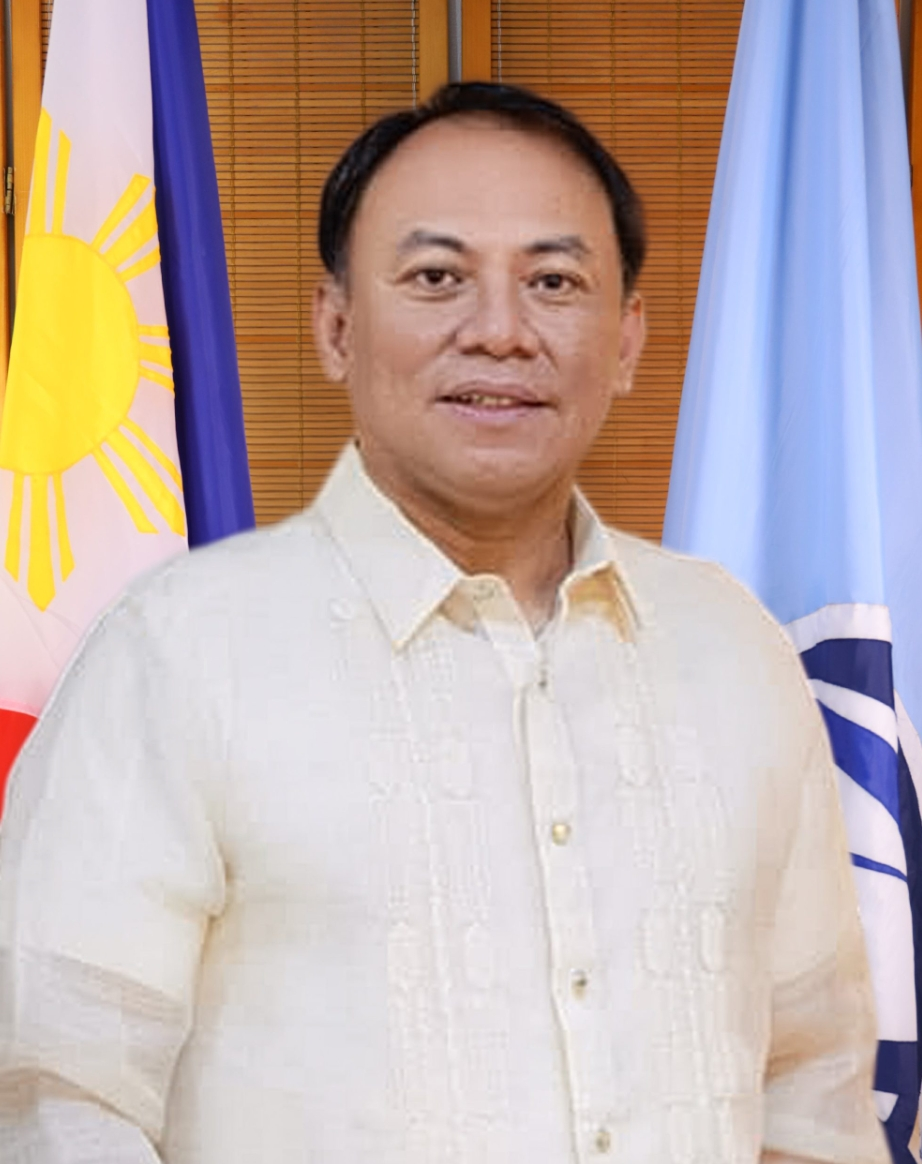

Secretary of Justice
- Acting
- Assumed office October 10, 2025 (Note: Served as Officer in Charge Secretary of the DOJ from October 10, 2025 until November 13, 2025.)
- President: Bongbong Marcos
- Preceded by: Jesus Crispin Remulla

Mayor of Mendez, Cavite
- In office June 30, 2013 – June 30, 2022
- Vice Mayor: Francisco Mendoza Jr.
- Preceded by: Manuel Romera
- Succeeded by: Francisco Mendoza Jr.

Vice Mayor of Mendez, Cavite
- In office June 30, 2007 – June 30, 2010
- Mayor: Manuel Romera
- Preceded by: Raygan Dimapilis
- Succeeded by: Ralph Sarmiento

Personal details
- Born: Fredderick Aure Vida; 1970 or 1971 (age 54–55)
- Party: Nacionalista (2012–2015; 2018–present)
- Other political affiliations: UNA (2015–2018); Lakas (2007–2009); Liberal (2009–2012)
- Education: University of the Philippines Diliman (AB); Ateneo de Manila University (LLB)

Fredderick Aure Vida born in 1971 is a Filipino lawyer and politician who has served as the acting secretary of justice since 2025.

== Early life and education ==
Vida earned his Bachelor of Arts degree in Political Science from the University of the Philippines Diliman and pursued law studies at the Ateneo School of Law. He graduated with a Juris Doctor degree from Ateneo, earning the distinction of Silver Medalist. Following this, he successfully passed the 1996 Bar Examinations and was admitted to the Philippine Bar in 1997.

== Career ==
Vida began his legal career as an associate in a private law firm and later established his own law practice. In 2006, he assumed the role of Assistant Secretary in the Office of the Chief Presidential Legal Counsel.

In 2007, he was elected as the vice mayor of Mendez, Cavite. He ran for re-election in 2010 but lost to Ralph Sarmiento. He subsequently served as mayor of Mendez from 2013 to 2022, serving three consecutive terms. During his final term as mayor, he concurrently served as the President of the Mayor's League of Cavite from 2019 to 2022.

He was entrusted with the role of Assistant Secretary of the Department of Justice in January 2023, under fellow Caviteño and Justice Secretary Jesus Crispin Remulla, and was eventually appointed as Undersecretary in October 2023.

Since 2025, Vida has served as acting secretary of justice, following the appointment of Remulla as ombudsman. On November 13, 2025, Vida's appointment as the Secretary of Justice was officially confirmed by Department of Justice.

== Notes ==
Political offices
| Preceded by Raygan Dimapilis | Vice Mayor of Mendez, Cavite; 2007–2010 | Succeeded by Ralph Sarmiento |
| Preceded by Manuel Romera | Mayor of Mendez, Cavite; 2013–2022 | Succeeded by Francisco Mendoza Jr. |
| Preceded by Jesus Crispin Remulla | Acting Secretary of Justice; 2025–present | Incumbent |
Order of precedence
| Preceded by Frederick Go as Secretary of Finance (Ad interim) | Order of Precedence of the Philippines as Acting Secretary of Justice | Succeeded by Francisco Tiu Laurel Jr. as Secretary of Agriculture |
