= Rolando Toledo =

Filipino accountant and civil servant

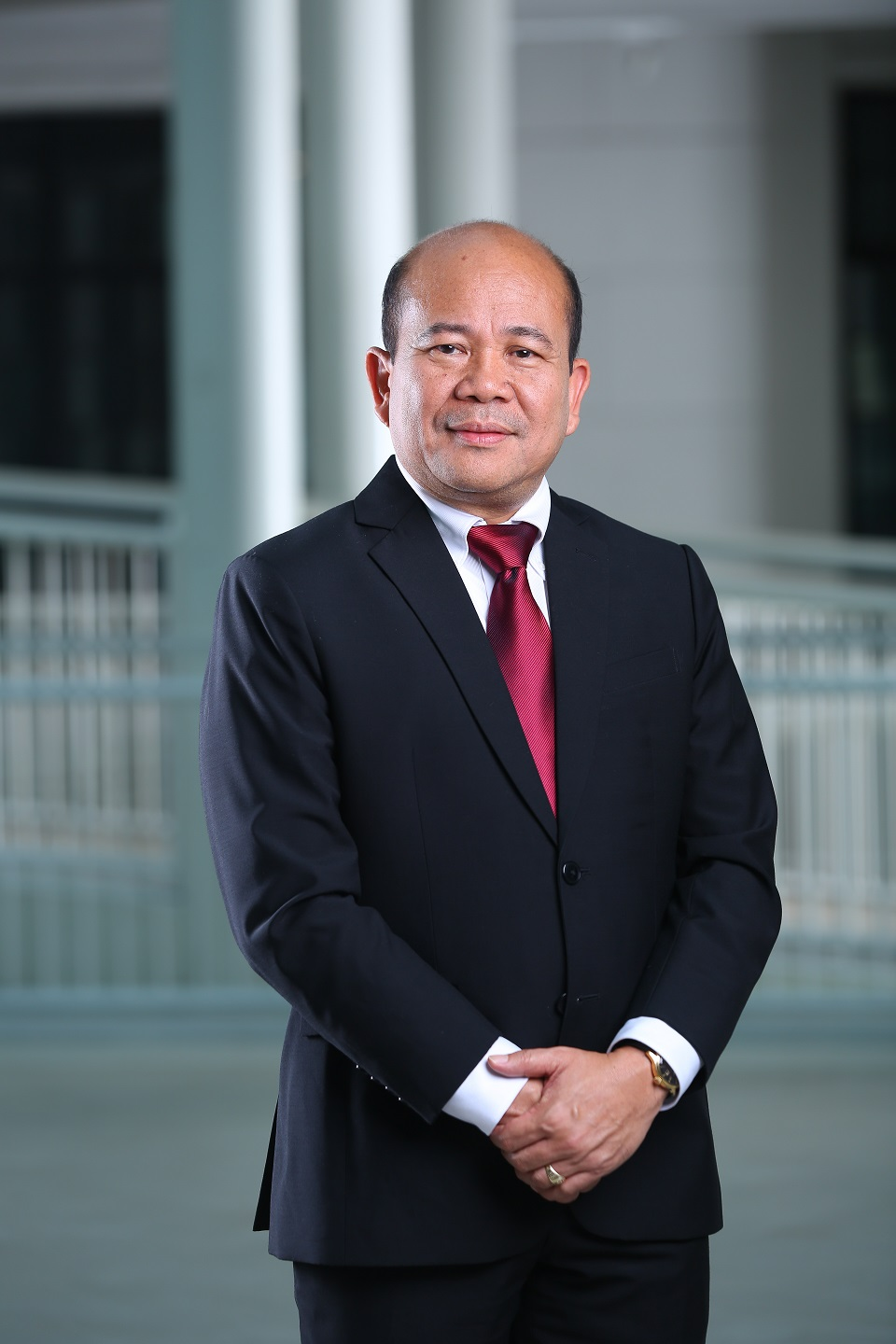
- Toledo in 2025

Secretary of Budget and Management
- Acting; November 17, 2025 – May 18, 2026
- President: Bongbong Marcos
- Preceded by: Amenah Pangandaman
- Succeeded by: Kim Robert de Leon

Undersecretary of the Budget and Management for the Budget Preparation and Execution Group
- In office 2024–2025

Personal details
- Born: Rolando U. Toledo
- Party: Independent
- Children: 3
- Education: University of the East (BS) National Defense College of the Philippines (MNSA)
- Profession: Certified public accountant; civil servant

Rolando "Rolly" U. Toledo is a Filipino bureaucrat who served as the acting Secretary of Budget and Management from 2025 to 2026, following the resignation of Secretary Amenah Pangandaman.

== Early life and education ==
Toledo took his Bachelor of Science degree in business administration from the University of the East in 1984 and became a certified public accountant in 1985. He also took a master's degree in National Security Administration from the National Defense College of the Philippines in June 2024.

== Department of Budget and Management ==
Toledo entered the Department of Budget and Management (DBM) in 1987 as a budget analyst, a position he held until 2012. He served as the Director of the Fiscal Planning and Reforms Bureau from 2013. In 2023, Toledo became an Assistant Secretary of the DBM. The following year, he was appointed as the Undersecretary for the Budget Preparation and Execution Group.

He has also served Assistant Secretary of the DBM for Local Government and Regional Operations, where he assisted in the supervision of the Local Government and Regional Coordination Bureau and regional offices in ensuring the budget and management policies were consistently implemented.

=== Acting Secretary (2025–2026) ===
On November 17, 2025, President Bongbong Marcos accepted the resignation of Budget and Management Secretary Amenah Pangandaman, after the department was implicated in the flood control projects scandal. Following her departure, Marcos appointed Toledo to lead the department as an officer in charge. Upon taking office, Toledo stated that reforming the department would be a priority of his tenure.

On December 9, Marcos swore in Toledo as acting secretary. During his tenure, he oversaw the 2026 national budget, a plan he described as "clean, from the deliberation to the bicameral". In January 2026, he approved the release of ₱1.19 trillion in National Tax Allotments to local government units for that fiscal year.

On May 18, 2026, Marcos announced the appointment of Toledo as a trustee of the Government Service Insurance System following the appointment of Kim Robert de Leon as budget and management secretary. He assumed his new role the following day, leaving the DBM after six months as acting secretary.

== Personal life ==
Toledo is married and has three children.

Political offices
Preceded by Amenah Pangandaman	Acting Secretary of Budget and Management; 2025–present	Incumbent
Order of precedence
Preceded by Renato Solidum Jr. as Secretary of Science and Technology	Order of Precedence of the Philippines as Acting Secretary of Budget and Management	Succeeded by Sharon Garin as Secretary of Energy
