= Amenah Pangandaman =

Filipino economist (born 1977)

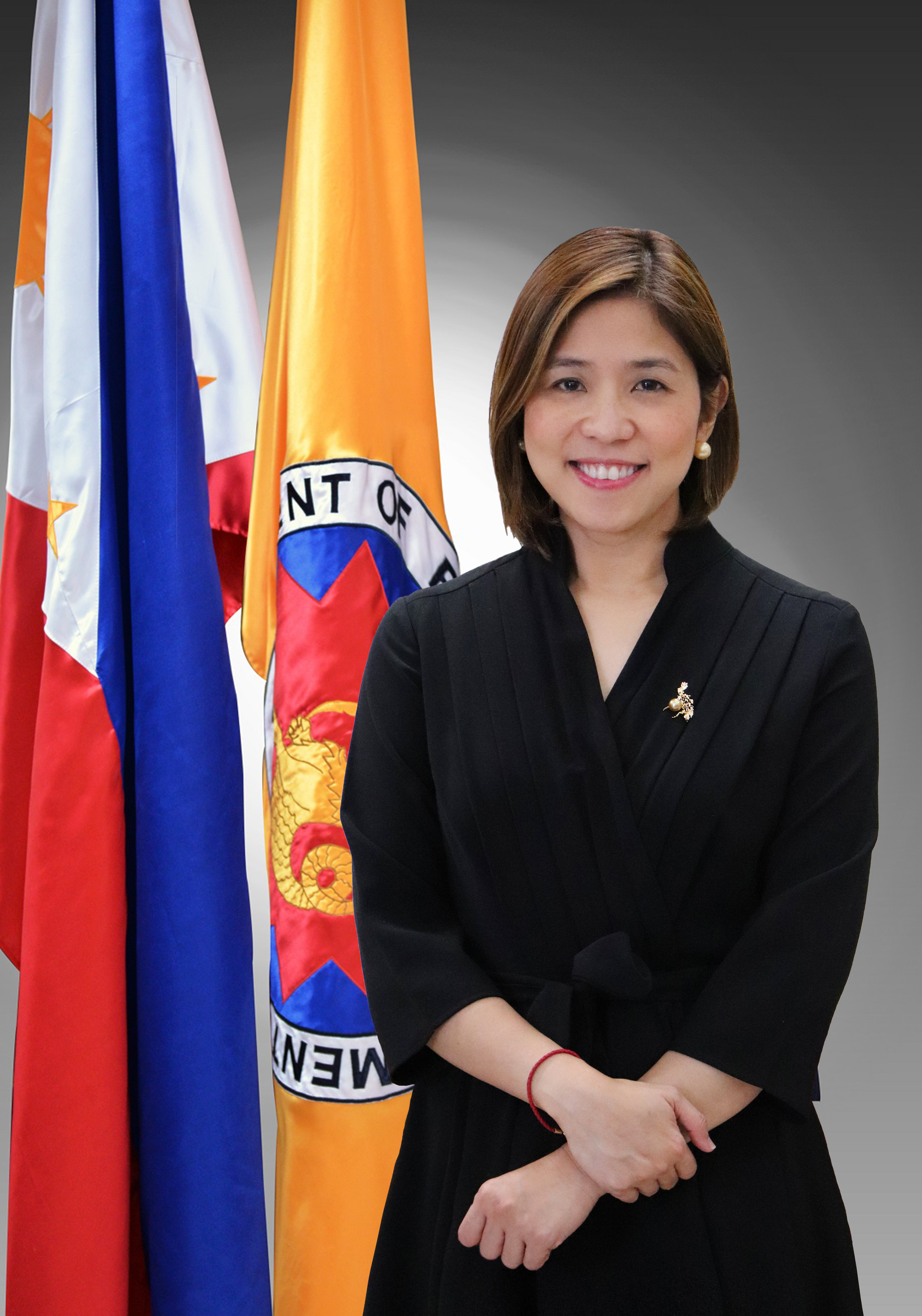
- Official portrait, 2022

Chairperson and Chief Executive Officer of the Al-Amanah Islamic Bank
- Incumbent
- Assumed office July 10, 2026

13th Secretary of Budget and Management
- In office June 30, 2022 – November 17, 2025
- President: Bongbong Marcos
- Preceded by: Tina Rose Marie Canda (OIC)
- Succeeded by: Rolando Toledo (Acting)

Personal details
- Born: Amenah Flaminiano Pangandaman; December 25, 1977 (age 48)
- Education: Far Eastern University (BS) University of the Philippines Diliman (MA) London School of Economics (EMPA)

Amenah Flaminiano Pangandaman (born December 25, 1977) is a Filipino economist who is the current Chairperson and Chief Executive Officer of the Al-Amanah Islamic Investment Bank of the Philippines and served as the 13th Secretary of Budget and Management from 2022 until 2025 under the administration of President Bongbong Marcos. She was the first Muslim woman budget secretary and was the sole female member of President Marcos's economic team until her resignation as secretary. Prior to serving as budget secretary, she was assistant governor at the Bangko Sentral ng Pilipinas from 2021 to 2022, as well as the chief of staff to Benjamin Diokno from 2016 to 2022, to Senator Loren Legarda from 2015 to 2016, and to Senator Edgardo Angara from 2007 to 2013.

== Early life and education ==
Born on December 25, 1977, Pangandaman is the only child of Almen and Nancy Pangandaman, two former government workers.

She earned her bachelor's degree in economics from Far Eastern University. She also has a master's degree in Development Economics from the University of the Philippines Diliman. Currently, she is pursuing an Executive Master of Public Administration from the London School of Economics.

== Career ==
Pangandaman started her career as a researcher at the Senate of the Philippines. She climbed up the ranks until eventually becoming chief of staff to former Senate president Edgardo Angara in 2007. She also worked with former Senate finance committee chairperson Loren Legarda.

Pangandaman had served as a budget official during Benjamin Diokno's time as budget secretary, becoming assistant secretary from 2016 to 2018 and undersecretary from 2018 to 2019. During that stint, she was the group head of the Office of the Secretary and was a "key mover" in the preparation, implementation, and monitoring of the General Appropriations Act, or the national budget. In February 2019, Pangandaman's role in forming the 2019 national budget received scrutiny after several employees from the Department of Public Works and Highways (DPWH) testified before a congressional hearing that the ₱75 million added to the agency's budget was on her order. Diokno defended her by arguing that the amount added to DPWH's budget was "aboveboard", but the addition was nevertheless removed when the 2019 budget was ratified in the same month.

After Diokno was assigned to head the Bangko Sentral ng Pilipinas (BSP; lit. 'Central Bank of the Philippines') in March 2019, Pangandaman joined the BSP soon after as a technical advisor, later becoming the managing director of the Office of the Governor and Executive Offices in the same year. In 2021, she became its assistant governor.

She was appointed DBM Secretary by President Bongbong Marcos in July 2022. Meanwhile, her appointment was confirmed by the Commission on Appointments on September 28, 2022.

On May 22, 2025, President Marcos ordered members of his cabinet to tender their courtesy resignations following the results of the May 12, 2025, midterm elections. Pangandaman immediately complied with this order. However, on May 23, Executive Secretary Lucas Bersamin announced that President Marcos had chosen to retain his entire economic team, including Pangandaman, in their current positions.

She resigned as the Secretary of Budget and Management on November 17, 2025, following her office's alleged involvement in flood control corruption.

On July 12, 2026, President Marcos appointed Pangandaman as Chairperson and Chief Executive Officer of the Al-Amanah Islamic Investment Bank of the Philippines.

== Personal life ==
Hailing from Lanao del Sur, she is a Muslim and a Maranao princess. Her father, Almen, is from Marawi, while her mother is from Tarlac City. Her royal lineage is traced to her grandparents' membership in royal houses of the Maranao in Marawi. She is unmarried.

Political offices
Preceded by Tina Rose Marie Canda as OIC	Secretary of Budget and Management; 2022–2025	Succeeded by Rolando Toledo (Acting)
