= Raymundo Punongbayan =

Filipino volcanologist

- Born: June 13, 1937; Manila, Commonwealth of the Philippines
- Died: April 28, 2005 (aged 67); Gabaldon, Nueva Ecija, Philippines
- Education: University of the Philippines Diliman; University of Colorado Boulder
- Awards: Scholarship in Petroleum Geology, UP, Jose Maria Feliciano, 1957-1959 Scholarship in Geology, Univ. of Colorado, Rockfeller Foundation, 1965-1969 Likas Yaman Award for Studies on Mangrove Areas in the Philippine, MNR, 1979 Lepanto Professorial Chair in Geology, LCMC, 1982-1983
- Scientific career
- Fields: Geology, Petrography, Petrology, Photogeology, Remote Sensing, Structural Geology, Tectonics
- Workplaces: Philippine Institute of Volcanology and Seismology

Dr. Raymundo Santiago Punongbayan (13 June 1937 – 28 April 2005) was the director of the Philippine Institute of Volcanology and Seismology (PHIVOLCS) from 1983 to 2002. Punongbayan became popular after handling two well-known calamities, the 1990 Luzon earthquake and the 1991 Pinatubo eruption.

== Education ==
Raymundo Punongbayan studied his secondary education at Florentino Torres High School in Tondo, Manila. Punongbayan graduated from the University of the Philippines Diliman in 1960 with a degree of Bachelor of Science in Geology and earned his Ph.D. at the University of Colorado Boulder in 1972.

== Professional and family life ==
From 1975 to 1982, Punongbayan had multiple roles. First as associate professor of structural geology in the University of the Philippines from 1975 to 1982. He became a director of the Mines Research Division in Philippine Council for Agriculture, Aquatic and Natural Resources Research and Development (PCARRD) in 1977 to 1982. In the 1978, he became the president and general manager of Synergistic Consultants, Inc. Afterwards, he became a professor of geology at University of the Philippines in 1982.

He was the director of the Philippine Institute of Volcanology and Seismology (PHIVOLCS) from 1982 until his death in 2005.

Punongbayan's reputation was known globally and he was considered a respected figure in the volcanology and seismology community.

Throughout his career, he was a licensed geologist, professor, consultant, public servant and author of numerous scientific papers about geophysics and more than 50 books, community organizer and participant in dozens of international conventions for research preventions of natural hazards, and a notable expert in volcanology, geology, disaster preparedness and seismology.

A former governor of the Philippine National Red Cross, "RSP", as many of his colleagues and friends known him, became a member of the task force of the Development of Earthquake and Tsunami Disaster Prevention Master Plan for the Asia-Pacific Region and Philippine's representative in the ASEAN Committee on Science and Technology (COST) Sub-Committee on Meteorology and Geophysics.

Punongbayan's effort to closely monitor Mount Pinatubo and his information campaign to apprise nearby communities of the volcano's impending eruption saved thousands of lives in 1991.

Dr. Punongbayan was a father of four.

== Recognition ==
Punongbayan received two presidential awards in 1992 and 1996, the Pagasa Award for Public Service in 1994, the Unit Award for Excellence of Service granted by the United States Department of the Interior in 1991, and the United Nations Sasakawa Award for Disaster Reduction in 2001.

In April 2003 he was awarded the Sergey Soloviev Medal of 2003 by the European Geophysical Society for his exceptional research and assessment of natural hazards. He had been only the fifth scientist to receive this prestigious award. Established by the Interdisciplinary Working Group on Natural Hazards in recognition of seismology and tsunami research expert Sergey Soloviev's achievements, the medal is given to scientists who have made special contributions to the proper assessment and mitigation of hazards for the protection of human life and socioeconomic systems. Soloviev gained worldwide recognition as an authority in these fields and was a courageous advocate of the principles of international cooperation.

== Death ==
At the time of his death, he was serving as a member of the Philippine National Red Cross board of governors. Shortly after noon on April 28, 2005, Punongbayan and eight others died in a helicopter crash at Gabaldon, Nueva Ecija. The passengers in the Philippine Air Force (PAF) Huey chopper No. 324 were him, four staff members of Philippine Institute of Volcanology and Seismology (PHIVOLCS) and four Air Force crew members. They were on a mission to assess the area as part of the disaster preparedness operations program of the government and were also looking for possible resettlement for people displaced by flash floods and landslides.
