= Frederick Go =

Filipino government official and business executive

Frederick D. Go
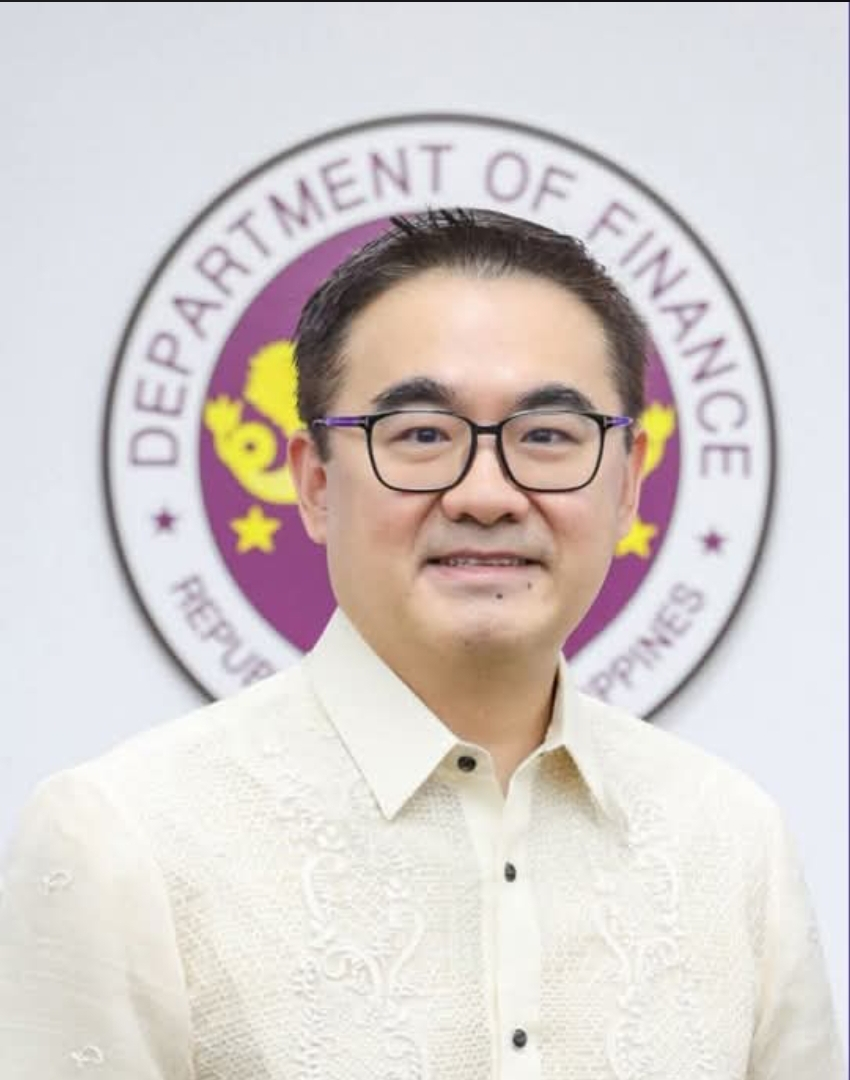
- Go in 2025

Secretary of Finance
- Incumbent
- Assumed office November 17, 2025
- President: Bongbong Marcos
- Preceded by: Ralph Recto

Special Assistant to the President for Investment and Economic Affairs
- In office January 12, 2024 – November 17, 2025
- President: Bongbong Marcos
- Preceded by: Position created
- Succeeded by: Office abolished

Personal details
- Born: Frederick D. Go; June 13, 1970 (age 56)
- Relatives: John Gokongwei (uncle); Lance Gokongwei (cousin)
- Education: Ateneo de Manila University (BS)
- Occupation: Government official, former business executive

Frederick Dy Go (born June 13, 1970) is a Filipino government official and former business executive who has served as the secretary of finance since 2025 on an ad interim basis under President Bongbong Marcos. He previously served as Special Assistant to the President for Investment and Economic Affairs under President Marcos from 2024 to 2025. He previously served as the CEO of Robinsons Land.

== Early life and education ==
Frederick D. Go earned a Bachelor of Science degree in Management Engineering from the Ateneo de Manila University.

== Career ==
=== Business career ===
Go, a member of the prominent Gokongwei family, served as CEO of Robinsons Land Corporation (RLC), one of the country's largest developers of shopping malls and residential properties. Robinsons Malls are a large chain of malls in the Philippines. Aside from various positions under the Robinsons Land Corporation, Go is also the Group General Manager of Shanghai Ding Feng Real Estate Development Company Limited, Xiamen Pacific Estate Investment Company Limited, Chengdu Ding Feng Real Estate Development Company Limited, and Taicang Ding Feng Real Estate Development Company Limited. He stepped down from this position and several other corporate roles effective January 8, 2024, to join President Bongbong Marcos's administration. Go also serves as the Vice Chairman of the Philippine Retailers Association.

Retired global investment banker Stephen CuUnjieng says that Go, unlike most other well-known Filipino Chinese personalities, comes from industrialists not retailers and thus would be really much more helpful &/or effective in the Presidency of Bongbong Marcos regarding the country's economic and developments aims.

== Special Assistant to the President for Investment and Economic Affairs (2024–2025) ==
On January 12, 2024, President Bongbong Marcos appointed Go as the Special Assistant to the President for Investment and Economic Affairs (SAPIEA), a position with secretary rank. In this role, he oversees initiatives to enhance the Philippines' investment climate. The office was newly created to implement government economic programs with the goal of establishing the Philippines as a leading investment hub in Asia.

=== Economic initiatives ===
In his role as SAPIEA, Go has emphasized the importance of transformative efforts to position the Philippines as Asia's top investment destination. He has identified reforms as crucial to achieving this objective.

== Finance Secretary (2025) ==
On November 17, 2025, President Marcos appointed Go as the Secretary of Finance, following the appointment of Ralph Recto as Executive Secretary amidst the flood control projects controversy, that led to the resignation of Lucas Bersamin as the Executive Secretary. Go has served as secretary on an ad interim basis since November 17, 2025, as the Commission on Appointments has yet to schedule his confirmation hearing.

Political offices
New office	Special Assistant to the President for Investment and Economic Affairs; 2024–2025	Office abolished
Preceded by Ralph Recto	Secretary of Finance (Ad interim); 2025–present	Incumbent
Order of precedence
Preceded by Ralph Recto as Executive Secretary of the Philippines (Ad interim)	Order of Precedence of the Philippines as Secretary of Finance (Ad interim)	Succeeded by Fredderick Vida as Acting Secretary of Justice
