= Francisco Tiu Laurel Jr. =

Filipino CEO, billionaire, politician

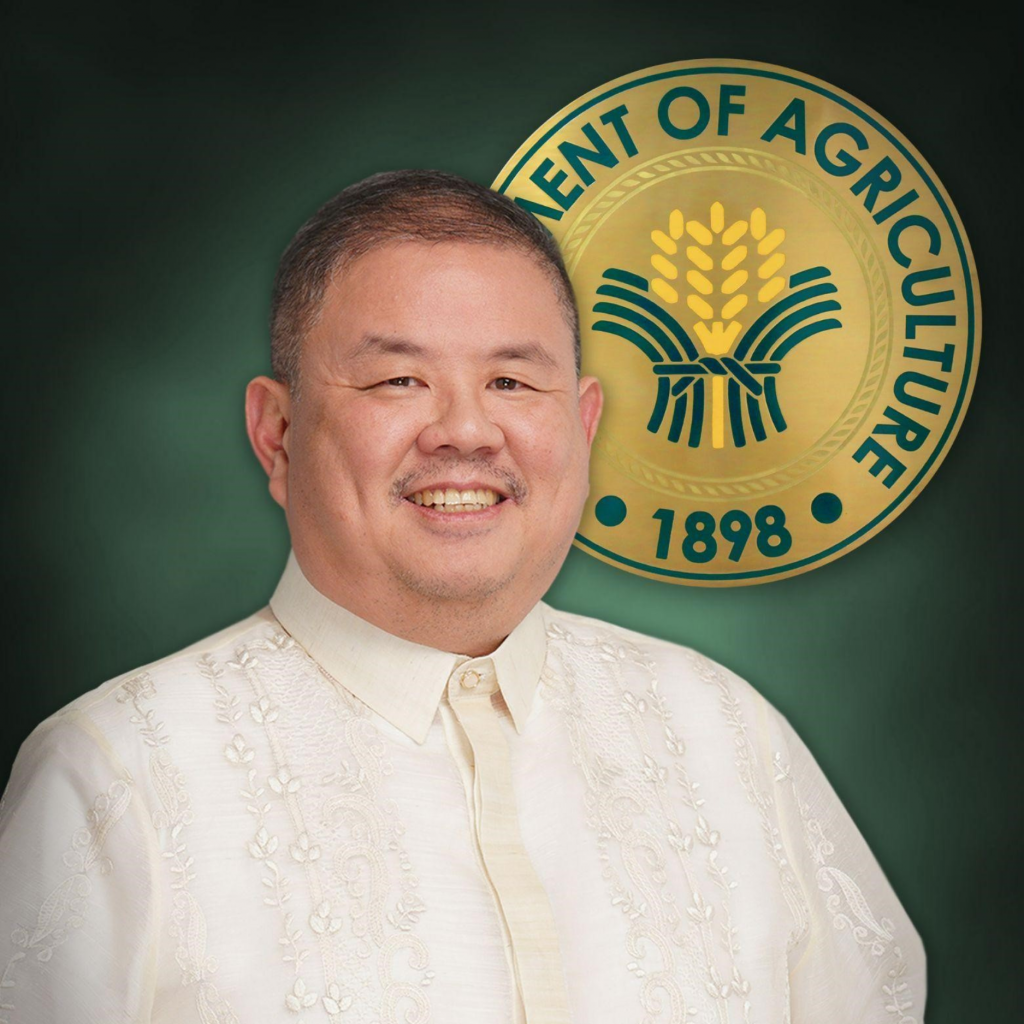
- Official portrait, 2025.

46th Secretary of Agriculture
- Incumbent
- Assumed office November 3, 2023
- President: Bongbong Marcos
- Preceded by: Bongbong Marcos

Personal details
- Born: Francisco Pe Tiu Laurel, Jr. 1966 or 1967 (age 59–60)
- Children: 3

Military service
- Allegiance: Philippines
- Branch/service: Philippine Navy Reserve Command
- Rank: Captain

Francisco "Kiko" Pe Tiu Laurel Jr. (born 1966 or 1967) is a Filipino businessman who has served as the 46th secretary of agriculture since 2023. He was also the president of the Frabelle Fishing Corporation, a deep-sea fishing company operating in the Asia-Pacific region.

Prior to his appointment, Tiu Laurel served as President of the Agusan Power Corporation, which operates the Lake Mainit Hydro Electric Power Plant in Agusan del Norte, which generates 24.9 megawatts. He also served as the chairperson of the World Tuna Purse Seine Organization, which aims to develop sustainable resource management for global fishing operations. Tiu Laurel also serves as captain and commander in the Naval Affiliated Reserve Force NCR of the Philippine Navy. He also served as the honorary consul of the Consulate of the Federated States of Micronesia in the Philippines.

== Early life and education ==
Francisco "Kiko" Tiu Laurel Jr. was born to Francisco Sr. and Bella Tiu Laurel. As a teenager, Laurel was involved in the Frabelle Fishing Company, and became a full-time employee at 20, where he started in the Engineering department before moving into sales and leadership.

He did not finish a college degree, saying that he had dropped out at the age of 19 to find a job that would support his first child.

== Career ==
=== Frabelle Fishing Corporation ===
Tiu Laurel became the president of the Frabelle Fishing Corporation in 1985 and its director in 2010. The family-owned business, which was established by Tiu Laurel's parents in 1966, is engaged in a variety of business interests in the agricultural and fisheries industry, such as deep-sea fishing, aquaculture, canning, meat and seafood processing, cold-chain network, shipbuilding and repair, and power generation. Frabelle operates in the Asia-Pacific region and supplies domestically in the Philippines and internationally.

Concurrently, Tiu Laurel served as President of the Confederation of the Philippine Tuna Industry from 2002 to 2006, director of the Interland Deep Sea Fishing Sector, director of the World Tuna Purse Seine Organization, and chairman of the Processing Sector of Bangus (Milkfish) Council of the Philippines.

=== Political involvements ===
In 2022, Tiu Laurel donated ₱30 million to the Partido Federal ng Pilipinas for the presidential campaign of its nominee Bongbong Marcos, establishing himself as the top donor. Additionally, he made contributions of ₱20 million and nearly ₱8.75 million for the successful senatorial campaigns of Migz Zubiri and Robin Padilla, respectively.

== Secretary of Agriculture ==
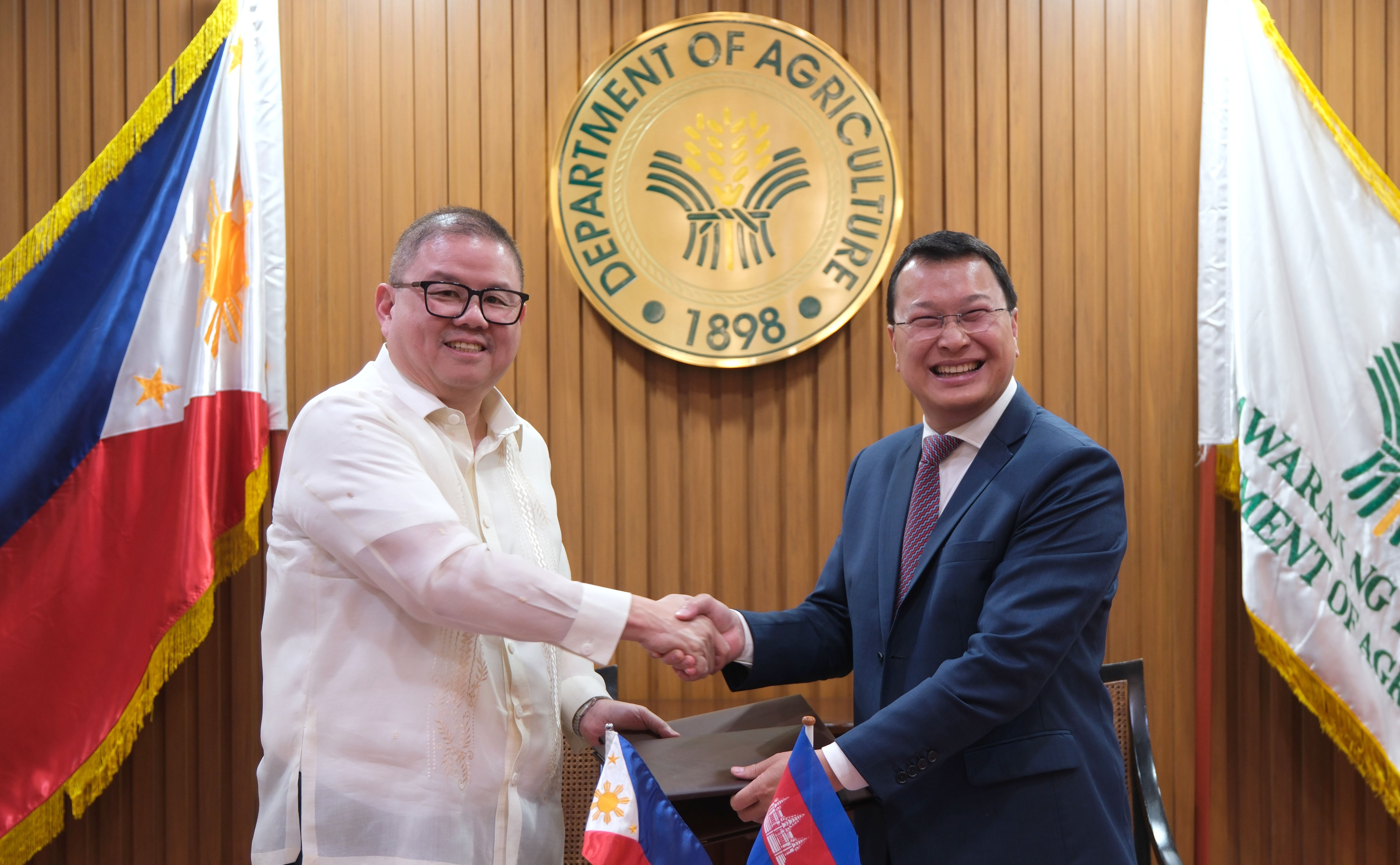
Tiu Laurel with Cambodian agriculture minister Dith Tina, February 2025

In 2023, Tiu Laurel was appointed by President Bongbong Marcos as secretary of agriculture. The post was previously held by Marcos himself. Before his appointment, Tiu Laurel divested his interests from his companies, following concerns of conflict of interest with the position.

On May 22, 2025, Tiu Laurel, along with other cabinet secretaries, were forced by President Marcos to tender courtesy resignations from their respective posts after the President called for a cabinet overhaul in the aftermath of the May 12, 2025, midterm elections. Tiu Laurel was ultimately retained.

== Personal life ==
Tiu Laurel was married to Francesca Carla Winebrenner, an actress known by the stage name Cheska Iñigo and a member of the board of director of Winebrenner & Iñigo Insurance Brokers, Inc. He is currently partnered with Yana, a Ukrainian. He has three children. His daughter Kei is a managing director of Frabelle Group and is married with two children as of 2018, making him a grandfather. His son Miko was an equestrian for Sarah Lawrence College during its 2014–15 campaign.

Political offices
Preceded by Bongbong Marcos	Secretary of Agriculture; 2023–present	Incumbent
Order of precedence
Preceded by Fredderick Vida as Acting Secretary of Justice	Order of Precedence of the Philippines as Secretary of Agriculture	Succeeded by Giovanni Z. Lopez as Secretary of Public Works and Highways
