= Department of Budget and Management =

Executive department of the Philippine government

- Kagawaran ng Badyet at Pamamahala

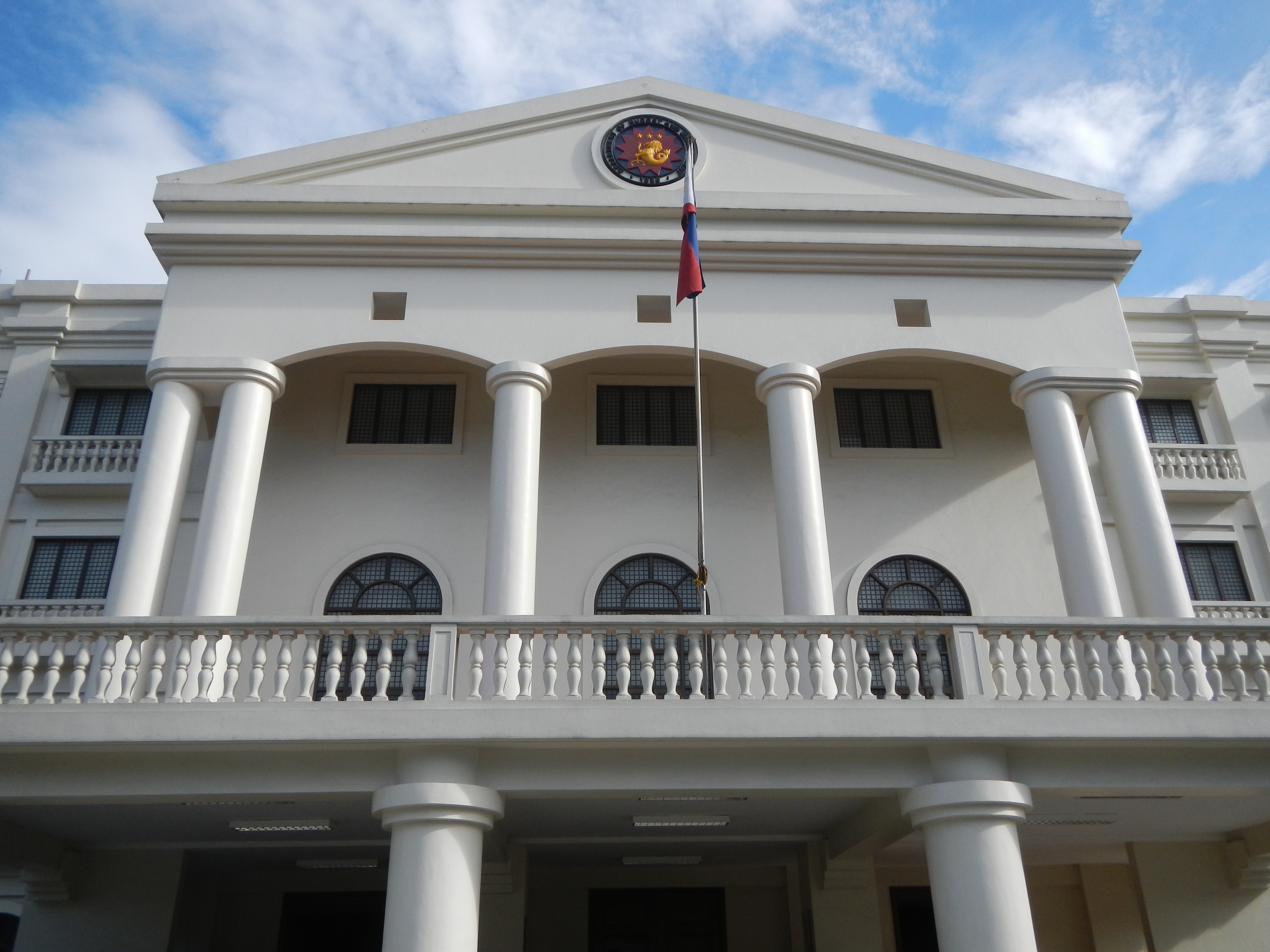
- DBM Main Building, Manila

Department overview
- Formed: April 25, 1936; 90 years ago
- Headquarters: Gen. Solano Street, San Miguel, Manila
- Employees: 1,085 (2024)
- Department executive: Kim Robert de Leon, Secretary
- Website: https://www.dbm.gov.ph/

The Department of Budget and Management (DBM; Filipino: Kagawaran ng Badyet at Pamamahala) is an executive body under the Office of the President of the Philippines. It is responsible for the sound and efficient use of government resources for national development and also as an instrument for the meeting of national socio-economic and political development goals.

The department has four undersecretaries and four assistant secretaries.

== History ==
At the beginning of the 20th century, the Second Philippine Commission, acting as a legislative body, enacted appropriations measures for the annual expenditures of the government. This was in accordance with the Philippine Bill of 1902, which decreed that disbursements from the national treasury were to be authorized only in pursuance of appropriations made by law.

With the passage of the Jones Law in 1916, the Philippine Legislature was set up with two chambers: the Philippine Senate and the House of Representatives. The governor-general was to submit, within 10 days of the opening of the legislature's regular session, the annual budget. Two years later, the Council of the State was formed to prepare the budget that the governor-general was required to submit to the Philippine Legislature.

A budget office was formed to assist in the preparation, enactment and implementation of such appropriations made by law. Four divisions made up the Office: a budget division took charge of agency regular budgets; an expense-central division took care of special budgets; a service inspection division screened appointments and requests for the creation of positions, and an administrative division handled routine administrative matters.

The Constitution of 1935 established both budget policy and procedure, which were amplified in a series of laws and executive acts over the years.

The Budget Commission was established by Executive Order (EO) No. 25 issued on April 25, 1936. It became a ministry by virtue of Presidential Decree (PD) No. 1405, signed on June 11, 1978. Following the pattern in the United States Federal Government, the Budget Commission was, and the Ministry of the Budget continued to be, part of the Office of the President and separate from the other fiscal agencies of government that form part of the Ministry of Finance.

The first budget law was passed on December 17, 1937, as Commonwealth Act (CA) No. 246. It took effect on January 1, 1938, providing for a line-item budget as the framework of the government's budgeting system. CA No. 246 called for a "balanced budget" emphasizing matching proposed expenditures with existing revenues.

On June 4, 1954, Republic Act (RA) No. 992, otherwise called the Revised Budget Act, was enacted providing for an enhanced role of the Budget Commission as the fiscal arm and budgeting adviser of the President. The preparation of the budget was to include the aggregation of the programs of the different departments and agencies of the Government. At this point, a performance budgeting system was introduced.

The Integrated Reorganization Plan of 1972, under Presidential Decree No. 1, implanted re-organizational changes in the Budget Commission with four of its units retained: the Budget Operations Office; National Accounting Office; Management Office; and Wage and Position Classification Office (GWAPOCO). Five staff units were provided the commission: for planning service; for financial and administrative services; or training and information services; a legislative staff; and a data processing center.

The change to a parliamentary form of government was instituted by the 1973 Constitution. The legislative branch of the government then referred to as the Batasang Pambansa, saw the minister in charge of the budget, chairing the Committee on Appropriations and Reorganization. Through the Budget Reform Decree of 1977, the planning, programming and budgeting linkages of the ministry were further strengthened.

The 1973 Philippine Constitution was superseded by the Provisional Constitution under Proclamation No. 3 of President Corazon C. Aquino. The legislative power was temporarily reposed on the president. Budgetary functions once more were exercised by the Office of Budget and Management.

EO No. 292, issued pursuant to the 1987 Constitution, provided for major organizational subdivisions of the Department of Budget and Management.

In 1992, under Fidel V. Ramos, government budgeting aimed to make the National Budget an instrument for breaking the boom and bust cycle that had characterized the Philippine economy in the past. Beyond sustaining the operations of government and its projects, the budget became an economic stimulus and a means to disperse the gains of economic development.

At the outset of Joseph Estrada's presidency, the Asian financial crisis that characterized the period prompted the national leadership to take a second look at the country's economic policies and strategies. To maintain macroeconomic stability in light of the effects of the economic turmoil, the government had to raise domestic demand by sustaining expenditures and pump-priming the areas of public infrastructure and social services. It had to adopt an expansionary fiscal policy by allowing a reasonable level of cyclical deficit to be financed largely through foreign borrowing while offsetting the negative impact of the deficit by introducing structural reforms in the budget process.

During this period, from mid-1998 to end of 2000, the DBM continued to introduce budgeting reforms that were meant to improve cash management, reduce uncertainty in the allotment and cash flow, and enhance transparency and accountability.

Under President Gloria Macapagal Arroyo, the DBM focused its efforts on deepening fiscal responsibility, enhancing the efficiency of public expenditures, and promoting good governance. Along with these major areas of concern, it intensified efforts at strengthening inter-governmental relations, eliciting increased participation from the private sector in the overall budget process and in intensifying public information on the administration's fiscal policy, thrusts, and budget policies and procedures. It likewise stepped up efforts at enhancing internal management in line with its vision to be seen as an organization that influences the spending behavior and management of resources of agencies towards transparency, equity, and accountability.

== Bureaus ==
- Budget Operations Office

Budget and Management Bureau A
Coverage:
• Department of Finance (DOF)
• Department of Public Works and Highways (DPWH)
• Department of Tourism (DOT)
• Department of Trade and Industry (DTI)
• Department of Transportation (DOTr)
• Department of Economy, Planning, and Development (DEPDev)
• Mindanao Development Authority
• Legislative-Executive Development Advisory Council (LEDAC)
• Cooperative Development Authority (CDA)

Budget and Management Bureau B
Coverage:
• Department of Health (DOH)
• Department of Labor and Employment (DOLE)
• Department of Social Welfare and Development (DSWD)
• Commission on the Filipino Language (CFL)
• Film Development Council of the Philippines (FDCP)
• Housing and Land Use Regulatory Board (HLURB)
• Housing and Urban Development Coordinating Council (HUDCC)
• Movie and Television Review and Classification Board (MTRCB)
• National Anti-Poverty Commission (NAPC)
• National Commission for Culture and the Arts (NCCA)
• National Historical Commission of the Philippines
• National Library of the Philippines
• National Archives of the Philippines
• National Commission on Indigenous Peoples
• Optical Media Board (OMB)
• Philippine Commission on Women
• Philippine Sports Commission (PSC)
• Presidential Commission for the Urban Poor

Budget and Management Bureau C
Coverage:
• Office of the President (OP)
• Office of the Vice President (OVP)
• Department of Budget and Management (DBM)
• Presidential Communications Operations Office (PCOO)
• Career Executive Service Board
• Congress of the Philippines
• Civil Service Commission (CSC)
• Commission On Audit (COA)
• Commission on Elections (COMELEC)
• Development Academy of the Philippines
• Anti-Money Laundering Council (AMLC)
• Games and Amusements Board (GAB)
• Government-Owned and/or – Controlled Corporations (GOCCs)
• Philippine Institute for Development Studies
• Philippine Racing Commission
• Presidential Legislative Liaison Office (PLLO)
• Presidential Management Staff (PMS)
• Senate

Budget and Management Bureau D
Coverage:
• Department of Foreign Affairs (DFA)
• Department of Interior and Local Government (DILG)
• Department of Justice (DOJ)
• Department of National Defense (DND)
• The Judiciary
• Autonomous Region in Muslim Mindanao (ARMM)
• Office of the Ombudsman
• Commission on Human Rights
• Commission on Filipinos Overseas
• Dangerous Drugs Board (DDB)
• National Commission on Muslim Filipinos
• National Intelligence Coordinating Agency (NICA)
• National Security Council (NSC)
• Office of the Presidential Adviser on the Peace Process
• Philippine Drug Enforcement Agency (PDEA)
• International Commitments Fund

Budget and Management Bureau E
Coverage:
• Department of Agrarian Reform (DAR)
• Department of Agriculture (DA)
• Department of Energy (DOE)
• Department of Environment and Natural Resources (DENR)
• Department of Information and Communications Technology (DICT)
• Climate Change Commission
• Energy Regulatory Commission
• Fertilizer and Pesticide Authority
• Pasig River Rehabilitation Commission
• National Disaster Risk Reduction and Management Fund (NDRRMF)

Budget and Management Bureau F
Coverage:
• Monitoring and Evaluation
• Department of Education (DepEd)
• Department of Science and Technology (DOST)
• Commission on Higher Education (CHED)
• State Universities and Colleges (SUCs)
• University of the Philippines
• Mindanao State University

Local Government and Regional Coordination Bureau
Coverage:
• Internal Revenue Allotment (IRA)
• Allocation to Local Government Units

== Attached agencies ==
- Government Procurement Policy Board-Technical Support Office
- Procurement Service

== Organizational structure ==
The Department is currently headed by a Secretary with the following Undersecretaries and Assistant Secretaries:

- Undersecretary Janet Abuel, Head of the Legal and Legislative Group
- Undersecretary Margaux Salcedo, Head of the Advocacy, Capacity Development, Economic Affairs and Stakeholder Relations Group
- Undersecretary Francesca del Rosario, Head of the Information and Communications Technology Group
- Undersecretary Wilford Wong, Head of the Local Government and Regional Operations Group
- Undersecretary Goddes Hope Libiran, Supervisor of the Media Affairs and Community Relations Office
- Assistant Secretary Mary Anne dela Vega, Head of the Budget Preparation and Execution Group
- Assistant Secretary Achilles Gerard C. Bravo, Head of the Internal Management Group
- Assistant Secretary Clarito Alejandro D. Magsino, Head of the Organization and Systems Improvement Group
- Assistant Secretary Rolando Toledo, Local Government and Regional Operations Group
- Assistant Secretary Romeo Balanquit, Head of the Budget Policy and Strategy Group
- Assistant Secretary Gerard Maula, Information and Communications Technology Group
- Dr. Joselito Basilio, Principal Economist

== List of the Secretaries of the Department of Budget and Management ==
The current secretary of the department is Kim Robert de Leon since May 19, 2026, pending Senate confirmation.
