= Secretary of Agriculture (Philippines) =

Cabinet position in the Philippines

- Official seal of the Department of Agriculture

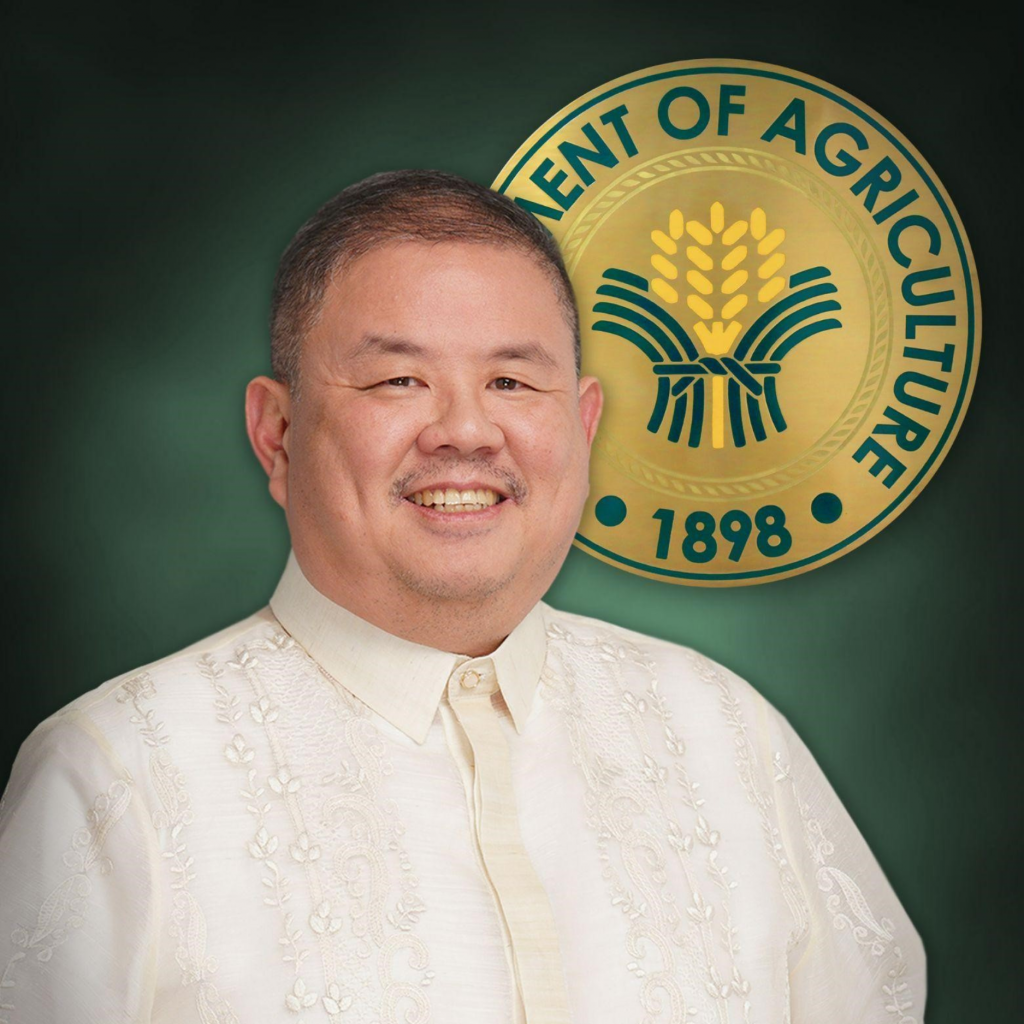
- Incumbent; Francisco Tiu Laurel Jr. since November 3, 2023
- Style: The Honorable
- Appointer: The president with the consent of Commission on Appointments
- Term length: No fixed term
- Inaugural holder: Jose Alejandrino
- Formation: June 23, 1898
- Website: http://www.da.gov.ph

The Secretary of Agriculture (Filipino: Kalihim ng Pagsasaka) is a member of the Cabinet of the Philippines in charge of the Department of Agriculture.

The current secretary is Francisco Tiu Laurel Jr., who assumed office on November 3, 2023.

== Functions ==
The following are the functions of the Secretary of Agriculture:

- Advise the president on agriculture and fisheries;
- Establish policies and standards for the department's operations;
- Promulgate rules, regulations, and other issuances;
- Exercise supervision and control over the department's functions and activities;
- Delegate authority to any undersecretary or other officers in the department;
- Perform other functions provided by law or assigned by the president.

== List ==
=== Secretary of Agriculture, Industry and Commerce (1898–1899) ===
| Portrait | Name (Birth–Death) | Took office | Left office | President |
|---|---|---|---|---|
| | José Alejandrino (1870–1951) | June 23, 1898 | January 21, 1899 | Emilio Aguinaldo |

=== Secretary of Welfare (1899) ===
| Portrait | Name (Birth–Death) | Took office | Left office | President |
|---|---|---|---|---|
| | Gracio Gonzaga | June 23, 1898 | January 21, 1899 | Emilio Aguinaldo |

=== Secretary of Agriculture, Industry and Commerce (1899) ===
| Portrait | Name (Birth–Death) | Took office | Left office | President |
|---|---|---|---|---|
| | León María Guerrero (1853–1935) | May 7, 1899 | November 13, 1899 | Emilio Aguinaldo |

=== Secretary of Agriculture and Natural Resources (1917–1933) ===
| Portrait | Name (Birth–Death) | Took office | Left office | Governor-General |
|---|---|---|---|---|
| | Galicano Apacible (1864–1949) | January 11, 1917 | October 31, 1921 | Francis Burton Harrison |
| | Galicano Apacible (1864–1949) | January 11, 1917 | October 31, 1921 | Charles Yeater |
| | Galicano Apacible (1864–1949) | January 11, 1917 | October 31, 1921 | Leonard Wood |
| | Rafael Corpus (1880–1960) | November 2, 1921 | July 17, 1923 | Leonard Wood |
| | Silverio Apostol; Acting | July 18, 1923 | September 6, 1928 | Leonard Wood |
| | Silverio Apostol; Acting | July 18, 1923 | September 6, 1928 | Eugene Allen Gilmore |
| | Silverio Apostol; Acting | July 18, 1923 | September 6, 1928 | Henry L. Stimson |
| | Rafael Alunan Sr. (1885–1947) | September 6, 1928 | January 1, 1933 | Henry L. Stimson |
| | Rafael Alunan Sr. (1885–1947) | September 6, 1928 | January 1, 1933 | Eugene Allen Gilmore |
| | Rafael Alunan Sr. (1885–1947) | September 6, 1928 | January 1, 1933 | Dwight F. Davis |
| | Rafael Alunan Sr. (1885–1947) | September 6, 1928 | January 1, 1933 | George C. Butte |
| | Rafael Alunan Sr. (1885–1947) | September 6, 1928 | January 1, 1933 | Theodore Roosevelt Jr. |

=== Secretary of Agriculture and Commerce (1933–1935) ===
Act No. 4007 was approved on December 5, 1932, renaming the Department of Agriculture and Natural Resources to the Department of Agriculture and Commerce on January 1, 1933.

| Portrait | Name (Birth–Death) | Took office | Left office | Governor-General |
|---|---|---|---|---|
| | Vicente Singson Encarnacion (1875–1961) | January 1, 1933 | July 26, 1934 | Theodore Roosevelt Jr. |
| | Vicente Singson Encarnacion (1875–1961) | January 1, 1933 | July 26, 1934 | Frank Murphy |
| | Eulogio Rodriguez (1883–1964) | July 26, 1934 | November 15, 1935 | Frank Murphy |

=== Secretary of Agriculture, Industry and Commerce (1935–1941) ===
| Portrait | Name (Birth–Death) | Took office | Left office | President |
|---|---|---|---|---|
| | Eulogio Rodriguez (1883–1964) | November 15, 1935 | November 15, 1938 | Manuel L. Quezon |
| | Benigno Aquino Sr. (1894–1947) | December 1, 1938 | August 28, 1941 | Manuel L. Quezon |
| | Rafael Alunan Sr. (1885–1947) | August 28, 1941 | December 24, 1941 | Manuel L. Quezon |

=== Secretary of Finance, Agriculture and Commerce (1941–1944) ===
President Manuel L. Quezon issued Executive Order No. 396 on December 24, 1941, reorganizing the Department of Agriculture, Industry and Commerce as the Department of Finance, Agriculture and Commerce.

| Portrait | Name (Birth–Death) | Took office | Left office | President |
|---|---|---|---|---|
| | José Abad Santos (1886–1942) | December 24, 1941 | March 26, 1942 | Manuel L. Quezon |
| | Andrés Soriano (1898–1964) | March 26, 1942 | July 31, 1944 | Manuel L. Quezon |

=== Commissioner of Agriculture and Commerce (1942–1943) ===
| Portrait | Name (Birth–Death) | Took office | Left office | Chairman of the Philippine Executive Commission |
|---|---|---|---|---|
| | Rafael Alunan Sr. (1885–1947) | January 26, 1942 | October 14, 1943 | Jorge B. Vargas |

=== Minister of Agriculture and Commerce (1943–1945) ===
| Portrait | Name (Birth–Death) | Took office | Left office | President |
|---|---|---|---|---|
| | Rafael Alunan Sr. (1885–1947) | October 19, 1943 | March 20, 1945 | Jose P. Laurel |

=== Secretary of Agriculture and Commerce (1944–1947) ===
President Sergio Osmeña issued Executive Order No. 15-W on August 8, 1944, reorganizing the Department of Finance, Agriculture, and Commerce as the Department of Agriculture and Commerce.

| Portrait | Name (Birth–Death) | Took office | Left office | President |
|---|---|---|---|---|
| | Manuel Nieto (1892–1970) | August 8, 1944 | February 27, 1945 | Sergio Osmeña |
| | Delfín Jaranilla (1883–1980) | February 27, 1945 | July 12, 1945 | Sergio Osmeña |
| | Vicente Singson Encarnacion (1875–1961) | July 12, 1945 | May 28, 1946 | Sergio Osmeña |
| | Mariano Garchitorena (1898–1961) | May 28, 1946 | July 1, 1947 | Manuel Roxas |

=== Secretary of Agriculture and Natural Resources (1947–1974) ===
President Manuel Roxas issued Executive Order No. 94 on October 4, 1947, reorganizing the Department of Agriculture and Commerce as the Department of Agriculture and Natural Resources as of July 1, 1947.

| Portrait | Name (Birth–Death) | Took office | Left office | President |
|---|---|---|---|---|
| | Mariano Garchitorena (1898–1961) | July 1, 1947 | September 1, 1948 | Manuel Roxas |
| | Mariano Garchitorena (1898–1961) | July 1, 1947 | September 1, 1948 | Elpidio Quirino |
| | Placido Mapa | September 21, 1948 | September 14, 1950 | Elpidio Quirino |
| | Fernando Lopez (Note: In concurrent capacity as the Vice President.) (1904–1993) | September 14, 1950 | May 26, 1953 | Elpidio Quirino |
| | Placido Mapa; Acting | May 26, 1953 | December 29, 1953 | Elpidio Quirino |
| | Salvador Araneta (1902–1982) | March 10, 1954 | August 13, 1955 | Ramon Magsaysay |
| | Juan Rodriguez | August 18, 1955 | March 3, 1960 | Ramon Magsaysay |
| | Juan Rodriguez | August 18, 1955 | March 3, 1960 | Carlos P. Garcia |
| | Cesar Fortich | March 3, 1960 | September 15, 1961 | Carlos P. Garcia |
| | Jose Locsin (1891–1977); Acting | September 15, 1961 | December 30, 1961 | Carlos P. Garcia |
| | Benjamin Gozon | 1962 | 1963 | Diosdado Macapagal |
| | Jose Feliciano | September 16, 1963 | 1965 | Diosdado Macapagal |
| | Fernando Lopez (1904–1993) | December 30, 1965 | January 15, 1971 | Ferdinand Marcos |
| | Arturo Tanco Jr. | January 15, 1971 | May 17, 1974 | Ferdinand Marcos |

=== Secretary of Agriculture (1974–1978) ===
President Ferdinand Marcos issued Presidential Decree No. 461 on May 17, 1974, creating the Department of Agriculture from the Department of Agriculture and Natural Resources.

| Portrait | Name (Birth–Death) | Took office | Left office | President |
|---|---|---|---|---|
| | Arturo Tanco Jr. | May 17, 1974 | June 2, 1978 | Ferdinand Marcos |

=== Minister of Agriculture (1978–1984) ===
President Ferdinand Marcos issued Presidential Decree No. 1397 on June 2, 1978, converting all departments into ministries headed by ministers.

| Portrait | Name (Birth–Death) | Took office | Left office | President |
|---|---|---|---|---|
| | Arturo Tanco Jr. | June 2, 1978 | June 27, 1984 | Ferdinand Marcos |

=== Minister of Agriculture and Food (1984–1984) ===
President Ferdinand Marcos issued Executive Order No. 967 on June 30, 1984, renaming the Ministry of Agriculture to the Ministry of Agriculture and Food.

| Portrait | Name (Birth–Death) | Took office | Left office | President |
|---|---|---|---|---|
| | Salvador Escudero (1942–2012) | June 30, 1984 | February 25, 1986 | Ferdinand Marcos |
| | Ramon Mitra Jr. (1928–2000) | February 25, 1986 | January 30, 1987 | Corazon Aquino |

=== Minister of Agriculture (1987) ===
President Corazon Aquino issued Executive Order No. 116 on January 30, 1987, renaming the Ministry of Agriculture and Food back to the Ministry of Agriculture.

| Portrait | Name (Birth–Death) | Took office | Left office | President |
|---|---|---|---|---|
| | Ramon Mitra Jr. (1928–2000) | January 30, 1987 | February 11, 1987 | Corazon Aquino |

=== Secretary of Agriculture (from 1987) ===
President Corazon Aquino issued Administrative Order No. 15 on February 11, 1987, converting all ministries into departments headed by secretaries.

| Portrait | Name (Birth–Death) | Took office | Left office | President |
|---|---|---|---|---|
| | Ramon Mitra Jr. (1928–2000) | February 11, 1987 | March 9, 1987 | Corazon Aquino |
| | Carlos Dominguez III (born 1945) | March 9, 1987 | December 31, 1989 | Corazon Aquino |
| | Senen Bacani | January 1, 1990 | June 30, 1992 | Corazon Aquino |
| | Roberto Sebastian (1944–2012) | June 30, 1992 | January 31, 1996 | Fidel V. Ramos |
| | Salvador Escudero (1942–2012) | February 1, 1996 | June 30, 1998 | Fidel V. Ramos |
| | William Dar (born 1953); Acting | June 30, 1998 | May 24, 1999 | Joseph Estrada |
| | Edgardo Angara (1934–2018) | May 25, 1999 | January 6, 2001 | Joseph Estrada |
| | Domingo F. Panganiban (born 1939) | January 8, 2001 | March 31, 2001 | Joseph Estrada |
| | Domingo F. Panganiban (born 1939) | January 8, 2001 | March 31, 2001 | Gloria Macapagal Arroyo |
| | Leonardo Montemayor | March 31, 2001 | December 8, 2002 | Gloria Macapagal Arroyo |
| | Luis Lorenzo Jr. | December 9, 2002 | August 15, 2004 | Gloria Macapagal Arroyo |
| | Arthur C. Yap (born 1965) | August 23, 2004 | July 15, 2005 | Gloria Macapagal Arroyo |
| | Domingo F. Panganiban (born 1939) | July 16, 2005 | October 22, 2006 | Gloria Macapagal Arroyo |
| | Arthur C. Yap (born 1965) | October 25, 2006 | February 24, 2010 | Gloria Macapagal Arroyo |
| | Bernie Fondevilla (Note: Bernie Fondevilla served in an acting capacity from March 1 until 8, 2010.) | March 1, 2010 | March 8, 2010 | Gloria Macapagal Arroyo |
| | Bernie Fondevilla | March 8, 2010 | June 30, 2010 | Gloria Macapagal Arroyo |
| | Proceso Alcala (born 1955) | June 30, 2010 | June 30, 2016 | Benigno Aquino III |
| | Emmanuel Piñol (born 1953) | June 30, 2016 | August 5, 2019 | Rodrigo Duterte |
| | William Dar (born 1953) | August 5, 2019 | June 30, 2022 | Rodrigo Duterte |
| | Bongbong Marcos (Note: In concurrent capacity as the President.) (born 1957) | June 30, 2022 | November 3, 2023 | Bongbong Marcos |
| | Francisco Tiu Laurel Jr. (born 1966/1967) | November 3, 2023 | Incumbent | Bongbong Marcos |
