= Secretary of Budget and Management =

Philippine government position

- Kalihim ng Pagbabadyet at Pamamahala
- Official seal of the Department of Budget and Management

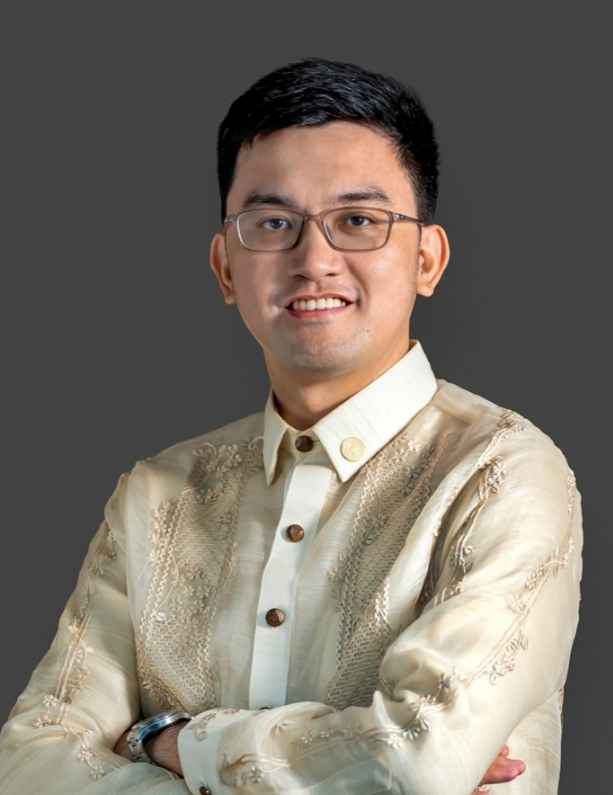
- Incumbent; Kim Robert de Leon (Acting) since May 19, 2026
- Style: The Honorable
- Member of: Cabinet
- Appointer: The president with the consent of the Commission on Appointments
- Term length: No fixed term
- Precursor: Commissioner of Budget
- Inaugural holder: Jaime C. Laya
- Formation: June 11, 1978
- Website: http://www.dbm.gov.ph

The Secretary of Budget and Management (Filipino: Kalihim ng Pagbabadyet at Pamamahala) is the head of the Philippine government's Department of Budget and Management and is a member of the president's Cabinet.

The position has been held by Kim Robert de Leon since May 19, 2026.

The department has four undersecretaries and four assistant secretaries.

== Powers and functions ==
According to the Administrative Code of 1987, the following are the powers and functions of a secretary:

- Advise the president on matters under a department's jurisdiction;
- Establish the policies and standards for a department's operation;
- Promulgate rules and regulations;
- Promulgate administrative issuances;
- Exercise disciplinary powers over officers and employees under a secretary;
- Appoint officers and employees in a department;
- Exercise jurisdiction over a department's bureaus, offices, agencies and corporations;
- Delegate authority to officers and employees;
- Perform other functions provided by law.

== List ==
=== Minister of Budget and Management (1978–1987) ===
Portrait	Name (Birth–Death)	Took office	Left office	President
	Jaime C. Laya (born 1939)	June 12, 1978	January 12, 1981	Ferdinand Marcos
	Manuel Alba (1939–2023)	January 25, 1981	February 25, 1986	Ferdinand Marcos
	Alberto Romulo (born 1933)	February 25, 1986	February 11, 1987	Corazon Aquino

=== Secretary of Budget and Management (from 1987) ===
President Corazon Aquino issued Administrative Order No. 15 on February 11, 1987, converting all ministries into departments headed by secretaries.

Portrait	Name (Birth–Death)	Took office	Left office	President
	Alberto Romulo (born 1933)	February 11, 1987	March 13, 1987	Corazon Aquino
	Guillermo Carague	March 13, 1987	February 12, 1992	Corazon Aquino
	Salvador Enriquez Jr.	February 12, 1992	February 1, 1998	Corazon Aquino
	Salvador Enriquez Jr.	February 12, 1992	February 1, 1998	Fidel V. Ramos
	Emilia Boncodin (1954–2010); Acting	February 1, 1998	June 30, 1998	Fidel V. Ramos
	Benjamin Diokno (born 1948)	June 30, 1998	January 20, 2001	Joseph Estrada
	Emilia Boncodin (1954–2010)	January 23, 2001	July 8, 2005	Gloria Macapagal Arroyo
	Mario Relampagos; Officer in Charge	July 9, 2005	July 19, 2005	Gloria Macapagal Arroyo
	Romulo Neri (born 1950)	July 19, 2005	February 5, 2006	Gloria Macapagal Arroyo
	Rolando Andaya Jr. (1969–2022)	February 5, 2006	February 24, 2010	Gloria Macapagal Arroyo
	Joaquin Lagonera; Acting	March 8, 2010	June 30, 2010	Gloria Macapagal Arroyo
	Florencio Abad (born 1954)	June 30, 2010	June 30, 2016	Benigno Aquino III
	Benjamin Diokno (born 1948)	June 30, 2016	March 4, 2019	Rodrigo Duterte
	Janet Abuel (born 1971); Officer in Charge	March 5, 2019	August 5, 2019	Rodrigo Duterte
	Wendel Avisado (born 1953)	August 5, 2019	August 13, 2021	Rodrigo Duterte
	Tina Rose Marie Canda; Officer in Charge (1961–2023)	August 13, 2021	June 30, 2022	Rodrigo Duterte
	Amenah Pangandaman (born 1977)	June 30, 2022	November 17, 2025	Bongbong Marcos
	Rolando Toledo; Acting	November 17, 2025	May 19, 2026	Bongbong Marcos
	Kim Robert de Leon; Ad interim	May 19, 2026	Incumbent	Bongbong Marcos
