= Cesar Purisima =

Filipino politician (born 1960)

Cesar V. Purisima
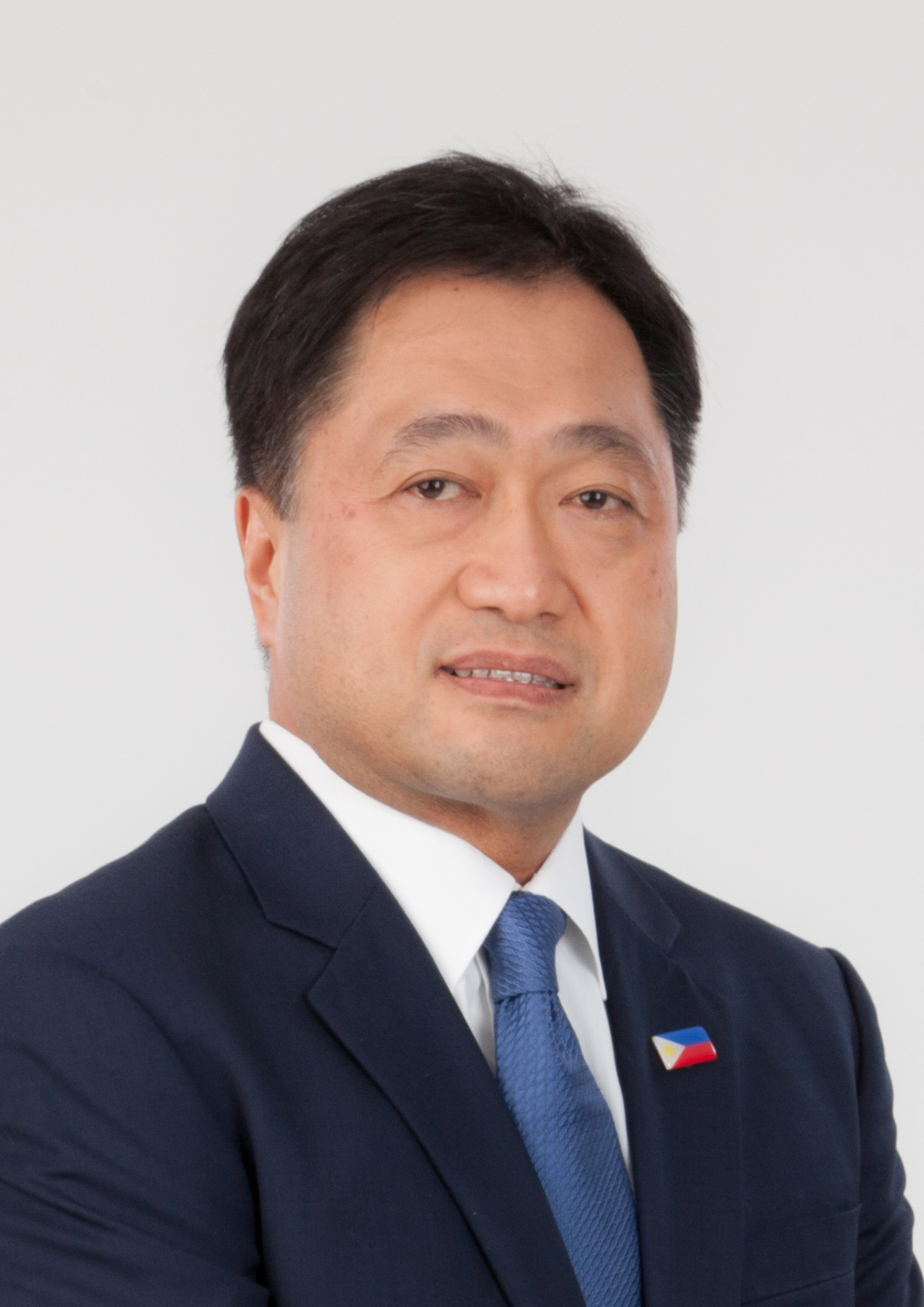
- Cesar Purisima in 2013.

Secretary of Finance
- In office 30 June 2010 – 30 June 2016
- President: Benigno Aquino III
- Preceded by: Margarito Teves
- Succeeded by: Carlos Dominguez III
- In office 15 February 2005 – 15 July 2005
- President: Gloria Macapagal Arroyo
- Preceded by: Juanita Amatong
- Succeeded by: Margarito Teves

Secretary of Trade and Industry
- In office 10 December 2003 – July 2005
- President: Gloria Macapagal Arroyo
- Preceded by: Manuel Roxas II
- Succeeded by: Juan Santos

Personal details
- Born: Cesar Antonio Velasquez Purisima; 3 April 1960 (age 66) Davao City, Philippines
- Spouse: Corrie de la Cruz (m. 2005)
- Children: 2
- Education: De La Salle University (BS); Northwestern University (M.B.A)
- Occupation: Accountant, financial expert, government official
- Profession: Business

Cesar Antonio Velasquez Purisima (born 3 April 1960) is a Filipino accountant and financial expert. He was the Secretary of Finance of the Republic of the Philippines under the administration of President Benigno S. Aquino III. He also served as the chair of the Cabinet Economic Development Cluster and member of the Monetary Board of the Bangko Sentral ng Pilipinas. Purisima is a multi-awarded finance minister, recognized 7 times in 6 consecutive years by various international institutions for turning the Philippine economy around and restoring investor confidence.

He had previously been Secretary of Trade and Industry and then Secretary of Finance during the term of Aquino's predecessor President Gloria Macapagal Arroyo but resigned amid the latter's involvement in the 2005 "Hello Garci scandal". Purisima is the third longest-serving Finance Secretary in history, behind Cesar Virata and Jaime Hernandez, and is to date, the longest-serving Finance Secretary after the EDSA Revolution of 1986.

He is one of the founding partners of Ikhlas Capital, an ASEAN private equity fund manager dedicated to partnering and growing companies that positively impact the development of the region, together with Nazir Razak, Kenny Kim and Gita Wirjawan, as well as one of the advisors of the Philippine media company ABS-CBN Corporation.

== Background ==
=== Education and early career ===
Purisima earned his bachelor's degree in accountancy at De La Salle University and pursued an MBA with specialisation in international economics, finance, and marketing at the Kellogg School of Management of Northwestern University in Evanston, Illinois, USA.

Before his stint in government, Purisima, a Certified Public Accountant, has had extensive work experience in public accounting and finance both in the Philippines and abroad.

From 1999 to 2004, he served as chairman and Managing Partner of the country's largest professional services firm Sycip, Gorres, Velayo & Co. (a member firm of Andersen Worldwide until 2002 and presently member firm of Ernst & Young Global). From 2001 to 2002, he was also Area Managing Partner for Asia-Pacific for Assurance and Business Services of Andersen Worldwide, making him the first and only Filipino so far to head the Area practice of a Big 4 accounting firm. In Ernst & Young Global, he was a member of both the Global Executive Board and Global Practice Council.

=== Government service in the Arroyo administration (2004-2005) ===
In 2004, President Arroyo appointed him Secretary of Trade and Industry. A year after, he was appointed Secretary of Finance. Purisima held the post for 5 months until his resignation together with nine other Cabinet ministers, a group known as the "Hyatt 10" which include then-Education Secretary Florencio Abad, the late Budget Secretary Emilia Boncodin, and Secretary of Social Welfare and Development Corazon "Dinky" Soliman.

=== Return to the private sector (2005-2010) ===
Together with members of the Hyatt 10, Purisima founded the International Center for Innovation, Transformation and Excellence in Governance (INCITEGov) as a trustee. INCITEGov engages in democratic politics to secure key changes in governance yielding development gains, and to scale up citizen engagement in politics. Purisima also ventured into various entrepreneurial pursuits.

=== Government service in the Aquino administration (2010-2016) ===
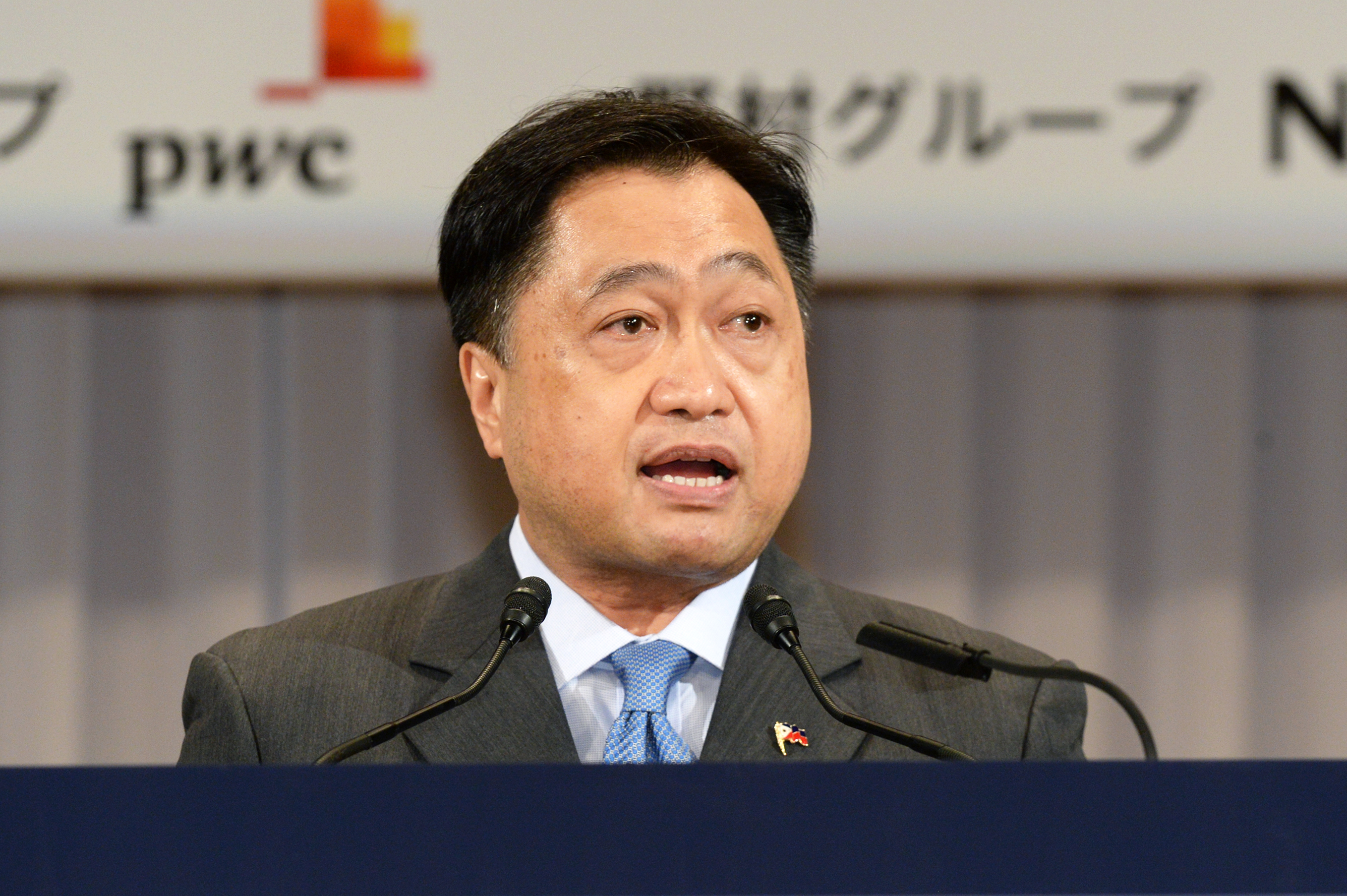
Finance Secretary Cesar V. Purisima at the Nikkei Future of Asia Conference, 30 May 2016.

On 30 June 2010, he returned to the finance portfolio in the cabinet of President Benigno S. Aquino III. With Purisima leading Aquino's economic management team, the Philippine economy has kept a 6-year running growth average of 6.2%, its fastest run in 40 years. Under the Aquino administration, the Philippines has also been enjoying strengthening investor and consumer confidence, upgraded to a notch above investment grade by Standard & Poor's and to investment grade by Moody's, Fitch, the National Information and Credit Evaluation (NICE) Investors Service, and the Japan Credit Rating Agency. With 24 positive credit rating actions since 2010, the Philippines is so far the world's most upgraded sovereign. Increased confidence on the Philippines’ prospects has led to a sixfold jump in foreign direct investments (FDIs), from $1.07 billion in 2010 to $6.20 billion in 2014.

Under Purisima's watch, the Philippines' debt as a percentage to GDP fell to a historic low of 44.8% as of 2015, a 10 percentage point decline from the 54.8% posted in 2009 before the Aquino administration took over with a governance philosophy espousing fiscal responsibility. Purisima was also a key champion of the Sin Tax Reform Law passed in 2013, which as of October 2015 has already raised an additional P149.5 billion in incremental revenues from excise taxes on the consumption of tobacco and alcohol products, which are then poured into the Aquino administration's universal health care program. As of 2015, the national Philippine government's deficit was contained to a healthy 0.9% of GDP, while tax effort as a percentage of GDP rose from 12.1% in 2010 to 13.7%, achieved through revenue administration reforms and tougher enforcement.

Purisima also oversaw a vast expansion of fiscal space, growing government revenues by 75% in 5 years from P1.208 trillion to P2.109 trillion, enabling the education budget of the government to double within the period. The health budget was also tripled, resulting to improvements in health facilities and the expansion of national health insurance coverage to 93.5 of 100 million Filipinos, up from only 47.1 million Filipinos in 2010. The Philippines also hit its infrastructure spending goal matched at 5% of GDP as of 2016, up by more than 4 times since 2010. The social services budget, used to fund the country's successful conditional cash transfer (CCT) program named the Pantawid Pamilyang Pilipino Program (4Ps), has within 5 years shot up by 9 times to cover what is now 4.62 million households.

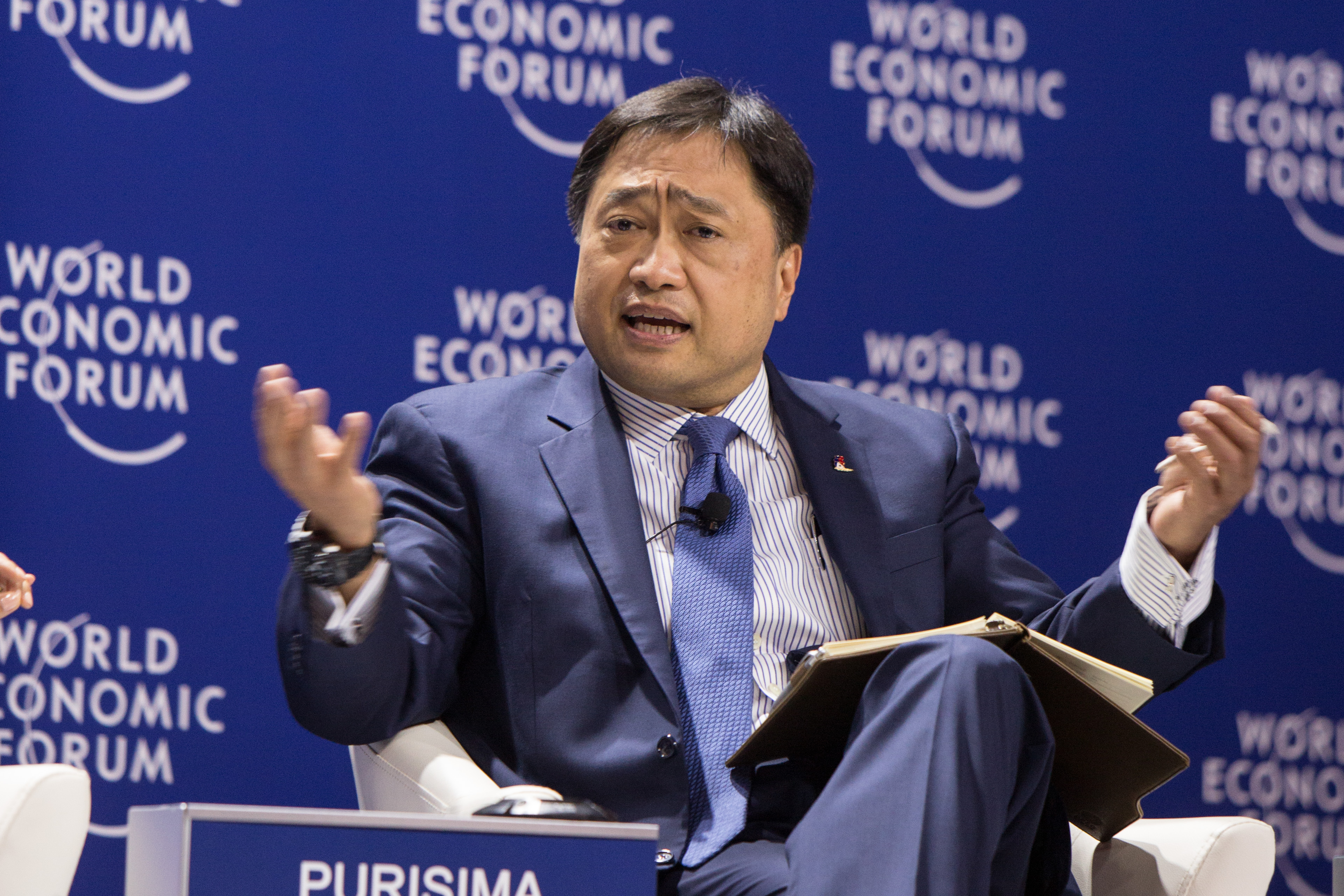
Finance Secretary Cesar V. Purisima at the World Economic Forum on East Asia 21 April 2015.

Purisima helped President Aquino achieve a strong fiscal position for the Philippines by cracking down on corruption, plugging revenue leakages, and strengthening tax administration and enforcement capabilities. The Revenue Integrity Protection Service (RIPS), housed within the Department of Finance, has focused on weeding out corrupt agents among the ranks of revenue generating agencies. Since inception in 2003 until end-2015, RIPS has charged a total of 271 personalities, 158 of which came from 2010 to 2015 alone. Successful resolutions of RIPS cases tallied up to 103, 78 of which came from 2010 to 2015 alone. Since 2010, the Run After Tax Evaders (RATE) campaign of the Bureau of Internal Revenue has filed 435 cases as of 5 February 2016, with total estimated tax liabilities of at least P73 billion. The Run After The Smugglers (RATS) program of the Bureau of Customs meanwhile, has filed 210 cases worth P57 billion in dutiable value since 2010.

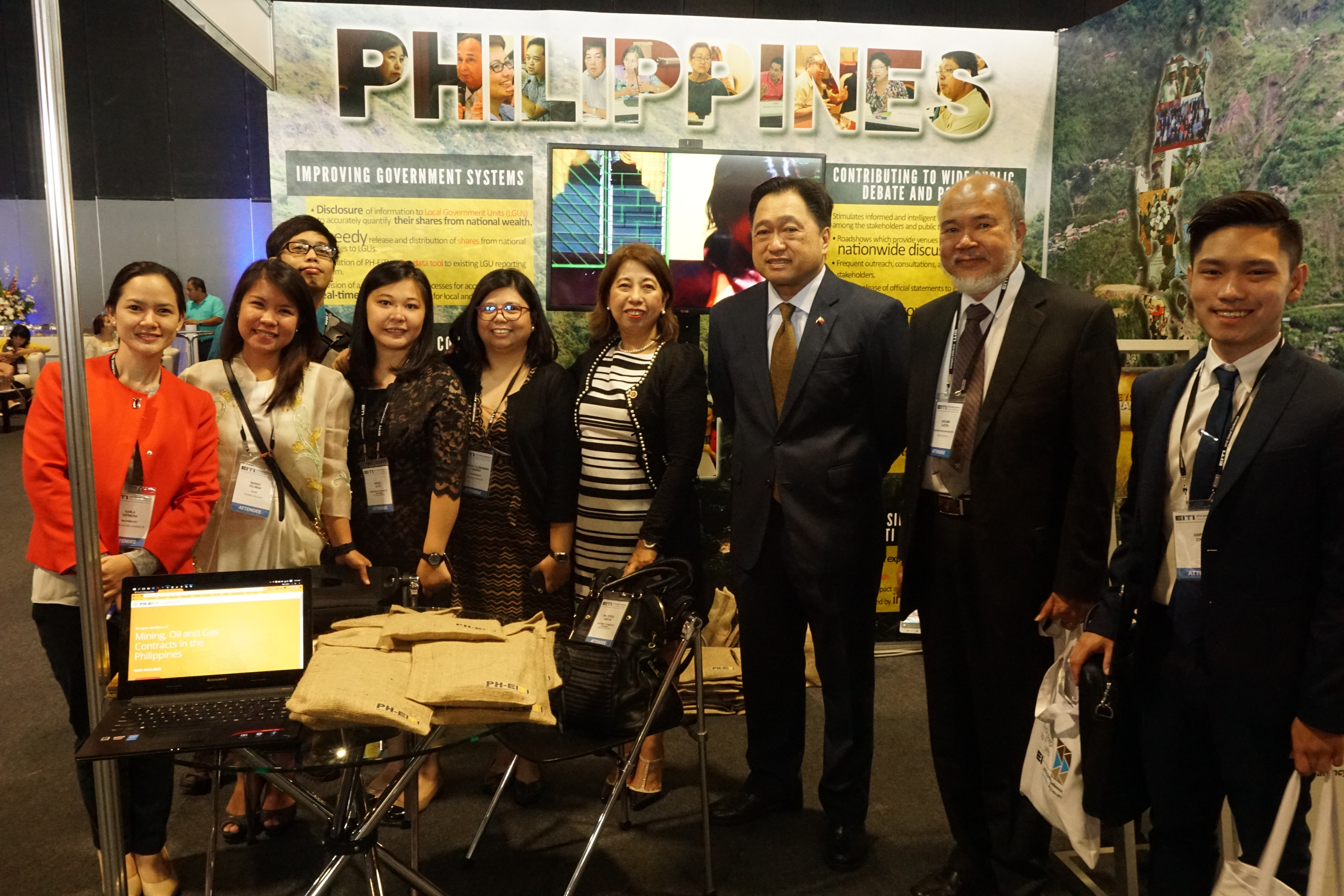
Finance Secretary Cesar V. Purisima with the PH-EITI team awarded at the Global EITI Conference in Lima, Peru on 24 February 2016.

Purisima also advocated for greater transparency in the extractives industry, believing that increased accuracy between government and company-reported revenues would empower the public to better understand how extractives are contributing back to the local communities where they operate. On 24 February 2016, the global Extractives Industry Transparency Initiative (EITI) awarded the Philippines during its conference in Lima, Peru for having exemplified how EITI reports can maximize impact, translating data collected into real governance reforms on the ground.

Towards the end of his tenure, Purisima sought to ensure a smooth transition process at the Department of Finance, welcoming his successor former Secretary of Agriculture and of Environment & Natural Resources Carlos G. Dominguez III. In institutionalizing an efficient turnover, Purisima simplified the agency's body of issuances by repealing 3,771 of its 4,323 outdated or incoherent department orders and collapsing 273 outdated committees from its 356 internal and interagency groups. Purisima also turned over a manual of key information and an economic data bank, as well as renovated the 5th and 6th floors of the agency's headquarters for the incoming Secretary's perusal. Purisima and Dominguez both had their teams working closely for a whole month coordinating an orderly transition for the latter to hit the ground running on day one.

As Finance Secretary, he is a member of the Monetary Board of the Bangko Sentral ng Pilipinas, the Governor for the Philippines in the Asian Development Bank (ADB), the Governor for the Philippines at the World Bank, and Alternate Governor for the Philippines at the International Monetary Fund. He is also ex-officio Chairman of the Land Bank of the Philippines, the Philippine Deposit Insurance Corporation (PDIC), the Philippine Export-Import Credit Agency, the National Power Corporation (NAPOCOR/NPC), the Home Guaranty Corporation, the National Transmission Corporation (TransCo), and the Power Sector Assets and Liabilities Management Corporation (PSALM).

=== Chairmanships in international fora and role in business sectors ===
In 2011–2012, Purisima served as Chairman of the Asian Development Bank (ADB) Board of Governors, chairing the 45th Annual Meeting of the Board of Governors in May 2012, where the Philippines showed off its hosting chops to the international community, earning the ADB's praise. Purisima was also instrumental in the Philippine hosting of the 23rd World Economic Forum (WEF) on East Asia in 2014. In 2015, while the Philippines hosted the Asia-Pacific Economic Cooperation (APEC) meetings, he served as the Chair of the APEC Finance Ministers’ Process (FMP) and shepherded the adoption of the Cebu Action Plan (CAP), the first ever roadmap under the FMP. The Cebu Action Plan is a four-pillar roadmap for a more sustainable financial future for the Asia-Pacific region. Its 4 pillars continue the progress towards the Bogor Goals of free and open trade and investment and consists of: (i) promoting financial integration; (ii) advancing fiscal reforms and transparency; (iii) enhancing financial resilience; and (iv) accelerating infrastructure development and financing. As of 2016, the Peru Chairmanship of the APEC Finance Ministers’ Process (FMP) is focusing on implementing the Cebu Action Plan. In 2015 he also served as Chair of the Vulnerable 20 Group of Finance Ministers under the Climate Vulnerable Forum, which the Philippines chaired that year. Purisima chaired the inaugural meeting of the V20 in Lima, Peru, announcing a series of actions to foster greater investment in climate resiliency and low emissions development both in their home countries and internationally. In its first statement, the group called the response to climate change a "foremost humanitarian priority," with the V20 committing to act collectively to "foster a significant increase" of public and private finance for climate action from wide-ranging sources, including international, regional and domestic mobilization.

In the inaugural meeting Purisima chaired, all 20 members agreed to establish a sovereign V20 Climate Risk Pooling mechanism to distribute economic and financial risks, enabling participating economies to improve recovery from climate-induced extreme weather events and disasters and to ensure enhanced security for jobs, livelihoods, businesses and investors. Modeled on similar regional facilities, the trans-regional mechanism would increase access to dependable and cost-efficient insurance while incentivizing scaled-up adaptation. V20 member countries also committed to develop or improve their financial accounting models and methodologies to enhance accounting of climate change costs, risks and response co-benefits in all their forms, while seeking a new international partnership to help realize the group's aims.

Purisma is one of the advisors of ABS-CBN Corporation, a media company owned by the Lopez Holdings Corporation.

== Personal life ==
Purisima was born in Davao City to the late Associate Justice of the Supreme Court Fidel Purisima and Fevic Velasquez Purisima, and grew up in General Santos before moving to Metro Manila. Purisima married Corazon "Corrie" de la Cruz in 2005. Together, they have two young children, a son and a daughter. Purisima and his wife are known breastfeeding advocates.

== Awards ==
Purisima was first recognized by London-based financial news source Emerging Markets as 2011 Finance Minister of the Year for Asia for his strong policy track record and steadfast commitment to maintaining economic stability. A year later, he was named 2012 Finance Minister of the Year by business and finance magazine Euromoney for his careful and successful stewardship of the Philippine economy whose growth stood against the challenging global macro-economic backdrop.

He was once again the choice of Emerging Markets for 2013 Finance Minister of the Year for Asia for his success in steering an economic policy that has led to upgrades in the Philippines’ credit rating to investment grade. In the same year, he was cited by the international publication The Banker as 2013 Finance Minister of the Year for Asia Pacific for elevating the status of the Philippines in the international community.

In 2015, he was awarded Finance Minister of the Year 2014 by FinanceAsia for his leadership in driving the comeback story of the country. In 2016, he was given a repeat award by FinanceAsia — Finance Minister of the Year 2015 being his second consecutive recognition by the publication —marking the completion of the economic turnaround of the Philippines. In late 2016, he was given his 7th Finance Minister of the Year recognition by Global Markets (formerly Emerging Markets) more than 3 months after stepping down from his post. Purisima's record of 7 consecutive awards is a first in the history of the Republic of the Philippines.

Purisima was the Alumni Merit Awardee for the Kellogg Graduate School of Management in the 2014 Northwestern Alumni University Awards, making him the first Filipino awardee from Kellogg and among the first Filipinos to receive such a distinction from the university. The Republic of France conferred him the Chevalier de l’ Ordre National du Merite (Rank of Knight) in the economic domain in 2001 for bringing together France and the Philippines. He was named Fellow of the Eminent Southeast Asians Programme of the Singapore International Foundation in 2003. In the Philippines, he has been granted the highest awards in accountancy by the Professional Regulation Commission and the Philippine Institute of Certified Public Accountants.

Purisima was conferred Doctor of Humanities, Honoris Causa, by the Angeles University.

On 24 June 2016, Purisima was awarded the Order of Lakandula with the rank of Grand Cross (Bayani) by President Aquino for his contributions in driving the Philippine turnaround story. The Order of Lakandula is one of the highest civilian honors conferred by the President of the Republic of the Philippines. The honor is conferred "upon an individual who has devoted his life to the peaceful resolution of conflict; upon an individual whose life is worthy of emulation by the Filipino people."

Government offices
Preceded by Manuel Roxas II	Secretary of Trade and Industry; 2004–2005	Succeeded by Juan Santos
Preceded by Juanita Amatong	Secretary of Finance; 15 February – 15 July 2005	Succeeded by Margarito Teves
Preceded by Margarito Teves	Secretary of Finance; 2010–2016	Succeeded by Carlos Dominguez III
