= Hyatt 10 =

Group of Filipino officials who resigned in 2005

The term "Hyatt 10" refers to a group of seven secretaries of the Cabinet and three heads of government agencies in the Philippines who resigned their posts on July 8, 2005, as a result of the Hello Garci scandal, which allegedly implicated then-President Gloria Macapagal Arroyo in rigging the 2004 general election in her favor.

The name "Hyatt 10" was coined because the press conference where the concerned officials announced their resignation was held at the then-Hyatt Regency Hotel (now Midas Hotel) in Pasay. Members of the group were appointed in the government of President Benigno Aquino III, Arroyo's successor, with some returning to their previous portfolios.

== Members ==
There were originally ten members of the Hyatt 10:

- Corazon "Dinky" Soliman, Secretary of the Department of Social Welfare and Development
- Emilia Boncodin, Secretary of the Department of Budget and Management
- Florencio Abad, Secretary of the Department of Education
- Cesar Purisima, Secretary of the Department of Finance
- Rene Villa, Secretary of the Department of Agrarian Reform
- Juan Santos, Secretary of the Department of Trade and Industry
- Imelda Nicolas, Lead Convenor of the National Anti-Poverty Commission
- Guillermo Parayno, Commissioner of the Bureau of Internal Revenue
- Alberto Lina, Commissioner of the Bureau of Customs
- Teresita Deles, Presidential Adviser on the Peace Process

It is believed however that there are more than ten members in the Hyatt 10: Soliman once claimed in 2006 that not only was the Hyatt 10 "intact", but that the group included "more than 200 other persons who had filed or signed impeachment complaints against Ms. Arroyo". They also co-founded the International Center for Innovation, Transformation, and Excellence in Governance (INCITEGov), a think tank focused on democratic reforms, after their resignation.

Several members of the Hyatt 10 returned to government service under the administration of President Benigno Aquino III, as he believed it would be "liberating" for them to do what they wanted to do in their respective offices, which he claimed they could not do under the Arroyo administration. Corazon Soliman, Cesar Purisima, and Teresita Deles were reappointed to the posts they occupied before resigning in 2005. Florencio Abad served as the Secretary of Budget and Management, Imelda Nicolas was chairwoman of the Commission on Filipinos Overseas, and Rene Villa was appointed to the board of directors of the Local Water Utilities Administration, replacing Prospero Pichay, Jr. Alberto Lina returned to the Bureau of Customs to replace John Phillip P. Sevilla who resigned in 2015.
