= Wendel Avisado =

Filipino lawyer and politician

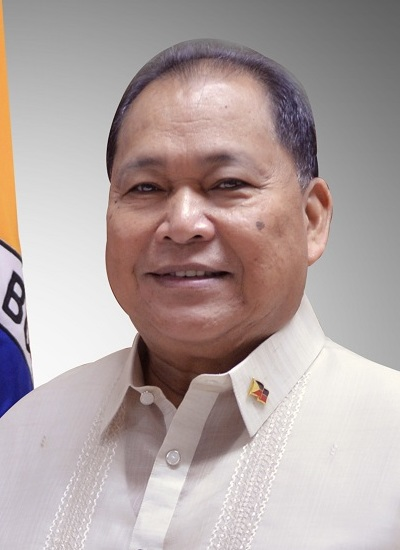

12th Secretary of Budget and Management
- In office August 5, 2019 – August 13, 2021
- President: Rodrigo Duterte
- Preceded by: Janet Abuel (OIC)
- Succeeded by: Tina Rose Marie Canda (OIC)

Presidential Assistant for Special Concerns
- In office November 8, 2016 – August 4, 2019
- President: Rodrigo Duterte

Executive Director of the Davao Integrated Development Program
- In office 1994 – August 2019
- Succeeded by: Josie Jean Rabanos

National President of the Boy Scouts of the Philippines
- In office June 17, 2016 – June 2019
- Preceded by: Jejomar Binay
- Succeeded by: Roberto Pagdanganan

Deputy Secretary General of Housing and Urban Development Coordinating Council
- In office August 17, 2010 – October 2015
- President: Benigno Aquino III
- Succeeded by: Jose Alejandro P. Payumo III

Member of the Davao City Council from the 1st District
- In office June 30, 2010 – August 17, 2010
- In office June 30, 1998 – June 30, 2001

Davao City Administrator
- In office June 2004 – February 2010

Personal details
- Born: May 29, 1953 (age 73) Surigao City, Philippines
- Party: PDP–Laban (from 2010)
- Other political affiliations: LAMMP (1998–2001)
- Education: Southern Island College; Ateneo de Davao University (LLB); Asian Institute of Management

Wendel Eliot Avisado (born May 29, 1953) is a Filipino lawyer and politician who previously served as the Secretary of Budget and Management of the Philippines from 2019 to 2021. He was appointed by President Rodrigo Duterte on August 5, 2019, succeeding Undersecretary Janet B. Abuel, who served as the DBM's Officer-in-Charge (OIC) following the appointment of former Secretary Benjamin E. Diokno as Governor of the Bangko Sentral ng Pilipinas. Besides having a long and distinguished career in government service, he is an active member of the Boy Scouts of the Philippines. He previously served as National President of the Boy Scouts of the Philippines from 2017 to 2019 and an ex-officio member of the national executive board. Avisado is among the "Davao Boys", a small circle of Duterte's trusted associates, which included Davao City administrators who were given key posts in the national government during Duterte's presidency.

== Personal life and education ==
Avisado holds a Bachelor of Arts degree in political science at Southern Island College known as (General Baptist Bible College). He is also a cum laude at Ateneo de Davao University with a degree of Bachelor of Laws.

He has attended special local and international training, seminars and workshops in various fields, such as Management Fellowship Program at the university of Brussels; Development Planning at the Asian Institute of Management; Career Executive Service Development Program at the Development Academy of the Philippines; Governance and Local Government Administration in the USA, the People's Republic of China and Indonesia; Urban and Regional Planning at the University of South Australia; Clean Cities Program in the USA and International Conference on Eco2 Cities in Japan.

He is a longtime member of Matina church of Christ in Davao City.

== Career ==
He has served the National Government as Regional Director of the Department of the Interior and Local Government Regions XI and XII from March 1986 to March 1993, and at the same time as Co‐Chair of the Regional Development Council (RDC XI). He advocates for the adoption of a Federal System of Government and champion's people empowerment and participatory development.

Avisado served as councilor of 1st District of Davao City from 1998 to 2001.

He previously taught at the College of Law of the Ateneo de Davao University and at the School of Management of the University of the Philippines, Mindanao Campus. He was a former vice-president for legal and external affairs of the JVA Management Corporation. He was elected No. 1 city councilor of the 1st District of Davao City in 2010 until his appointment as deputy secretary-general of the Housing and Urban Development Coordinating Council (HUDCC) on August 17. He was also the executive director of the Davao Integrated Development Program (DIDP). He was the Davao City administrator from 2004 to 2010 under Mayor Rodrigo Duterte.

He has represented the Boy Scouts of the Philippines in local and international conferences and Scouting events. He was the former chairperson of the ASEAN Scouts Association for Regional Cooperation (ASARC) and the first vice-chairperson of the Asia-Pacific Regional Scout Committee of the World Organization of the Scout Movement (WOSM) from 2012 to 2018.

On November 8, 2016, Avisado was appointed by President Rodrigo Duterte as presidential assistant for Yolanda rehabilitation tasked to oversee the implementation of housing projects for survivors of Typhoon Haiyan (Yolanda).

Political offices
Preceded by Janet Abuel; Officer-in-charge	Secretary of Budget and Management; 2019–2021	Succeeded by Tina Rose Marie Canda; Officer-in-charge
