= Carlos Dominguez III =

Philippine businessman and government official (born 1945)

Carlos Domínguez III

31st Secretary of Finance
- In office June 30, 2016 – June 30, 2022
- President: Rodrigo Duterte
- Preceded by: Cesar Purisima
- Succeeded by: Benjamin E. Diokno

31st Secretary of Agriculture
- In office March 9, 1987 – December 31, 1989
- President: Corazon Aquino
- Preceded by: Ramon V. Mitra Jr.
- Succeeded by: Senen C. Bacani

21st Secretary of Environment, Energy, and Natural Resources Minister of Natural Resources (1986–1987) Minister of Environment, Energy and Natural Resource (January–February 1987)
- In office October 25, 1986 – March 9, 1987
- President: Corazon Aquino
- Preceded by: Ernesto M. Maceda
- Succeeded by: Fulgencio S. Factoran Jr.

Personal details
- Born: Carlos García Domínguez III; September 16, 1945 (age 81) Zamboanga, Zamboanga, Philippine Commonwealth
- Party: PDP–Laban
- Education: Ateneo de Manila University (BS, M.B.A)
- Profession: Businessman, Politician

Carlos Garcia "Sonny" Domínguez III (born September 16, 1945) is a Filipino businessman who served as a Philippine Cabinet Secretary three times: as secretary of environment, energy, and natural resources (1986–1987), as secretary of agriculture (1987–1989), and as secretary of finance (2016–2022). Dominguez also served as CEO and chairman of Philippine Airlines from 1993 to January 1995, and as CEO, chairman and president of the mining company Lafayette Philippines Inc. from 2006 to 2008.

== Early life and education ==
Domínguez comes from a Zamboangueño family based in Davao City. Born on September 16, 1945, in Zamboanga City, he is the son of Carlos Domínguez Jr. and Virginia Ubeda García. His grandfather, Carlos Domínguez Sr., was a pre-World War II head of the Bank of the Philippine Islands (BPI) in Mindanao.

Dominguez grew up in Davao and attended elementary and high school at the Ateneo de Davao University, where he was one of Rodrigo Duterte's classmates.

He moved to Manila for his college studies at the Ateneo de Manila University. Domínguez graduated with a Bachelor of Arts degree in economics in 1965 and received a Master of Business Management from the same university in 1969. He also pursued post-graduate studies in California, where he completed the Executive Program from Stanford University's Graduate School of Business in 1982.

== Career and businesses ==
From 1969 to 1982, Dominguez managed agriculture-related enterprises ranging from the distribution of agricultural machinery to the management of 5,000 hectares (about 12,355 acres) of farmland producing bananas for export, as well as coconuts, cacao, rice, and cattle.

Domínguez joined the Bank of the Philippine Islands (BPI) in 1983 as president of the BPI Agricultural Development Bank. He was later invited by President Corazon Aquino to join her administration. He served as Minister of Natural Resources (Dec 1986–Jan 1987), then as Minister/Secretary of Environment, Energy and Natural Resources (January–March 1987), before becoming Secretary of Agriculture in March 1987 while also serving as director of the government-owned Land Bank of the Philippines.

After leaving government service in 1989, Domínguez entered the tobacco, energy, real estate, retail, hospitality, mining, and copper smelting industries. Domínguez served as CEO of companies such as the Retail Specialist Inc., Philippine Tobacco Flue-Curing and Redrying Corp., Philippine Associated Smelting and Refining Corp., as well as Halifax Capital Resources Inc. (owner of two four-star hotels in the Philippines). He joined the Philippine Airlines in 1993 and served as its chairman and CEO from March 1993 to January 1995, being succeeded by Lucio Tan.

In his long business career after his first stint in government, Domínguez served on the boards of Rizal Commercial Banking Corporation, House of Investments, Shangri-la Plaza Corp, Shangri-la Plaza Corp., Northern Mindanao Power Corp., Easycall Communications Philippines, Lafayette Philippines, Transnational Diversified Group, Central Azucarera Don Pedro, Roxas Holdings, and United Paragon Mining Corp. From 2001 to 2003, he served as director of Meralco.

He was the treasurer of the 2016 presidential campaign of Rodrigo Duterte.

Dominguez is an independent director of GT Capital, replacing Pascual Garcia III.

== Secretary of Finance ==
Domínguez returned to government service on July 1, 2016, as President Duterte's Secretary of Finance, and led the implementation of the Duterte administration's zero-to-ten point socioeconomic agenda. Dominguez is among the "Davao Boys", a small circle of Duterte's closest and trusted associates.

As Secretary of Finance, Domínguez served as a member of the Monetary Board of the Bangko Sentral ng Pilipinas, the Governor for the Philippines at the Asian Development Bank (ADB), the Governor for the Philippines at the World Bank, and Alternate Governor for the Philippines at the International Monetary Fund (IMF).

His post also made him ex-officio chair of various government-owned institutions – the Land Bank of the Philippines, the Philippine Deposit Insurance Corporation (PDIC), the Social Security System (SSS), the Philippine Guarantee Corporation (PHILGUARANTEE), the Philippine Export-Import Credit Agency (PhilEXIM), the National Transmission Corporation (TransCo), and the Power Sector Assets and Liabilities Management Corporation (PSALM).

As Secretary of Finance, he supervision the Bureau of Internal Revenue (BIR), the Bureau of Customs (BOC), the Bureau of the Treasury (BTR), the Bureau of Local Government Finance (BLGF), the Insurance Commission (IC), the National Tax Research Center (NTRC), the Central Board of Assessment Appeal (CBAA), the Privatization Management Office (PMO), the Securities and Exchange Commission (SEC), the Development Bank of the Philippines (DBP), the Philippine Crop Insurance Corp (PCIC), and the Government Service Insurance System (GSIS).

Dominguez was also served as chairperson of the Cabinet-level Economic Development Cluster. He also served as co-chair of the Intergovernmental Relations Body (IGRB), which is tasked to coordinate and resolve issues affecting the implementation of the Bangsamoro Organic Law (BOL) and the programs and projects of the national government in the Bangsamoro Autonomous Region in Muslim Mindanao (BARMM). In addition, he was the President's representative to the Climate Change Commission (CCC).

Under his leadership, the Department of Finance (DOF) drafted and introduced to Congress the first of a series of the Duterte administration's proposed tax reform packages known as the Tax Reform for Acceleration and Inclusion Law (TRAIN) Act less than 90 days from the time he assumed the Cabinet portfolio in July 2016.

President Duterte signed into law the TRAIN Act on December 19, 2017, which reduced the personal income taxes for 99 percent of taxpayers in the country. The passage of TRAIN was followed by other legislation such as the Tax Amnesty Act, the Tobacco Tax Reform Law, and a Sin Tax Reform Law that raised excise taxes on alcohol and electronic cigarettes to help fund the Universal Health Care Program.

During Domínguez's tenure, the Philippines’ key revenue agencies, the BIR and the BOC, continued to achieve strong revenue growth rates. It was also under his leadership that the BIR was able to collect its largest tax settlement from a single taxpayer in Philippine history, amounting to PHP30 billion or US$600 million.

Domínguez also combated corruption and modernized the country's tax collections and payments.

He also led the enactment of the Rice Tariffication Act, which liberalized the Philippine rice market and, in turn lowered the price of the country's staple food for more than 100 million Filipinos.

Domínguez also led the funding efforts for the Duterte administration's US$170 billion Build! Build! Build! Infrastructure Program through concessional loans from partner countries and institutions, such as Japan, South Korea, China, the European Union, the United States, and from the World Bank, the Asian Infrastructure Investment Bank (AIIB), and the ADB. As a result, the government's infrastructure spending rose from a pre-2016 average of 2.5% to above 5% of the country's GDP during the Duterte administration.

During Domínguez's tenure at the helm of the DOF, the Philippines received credit rating upgrades from Standard & Poor's, Moody's, Fitch Ratings, and the Japan Credit Rating Agency.

The Philippines enjoyed a record low debt-to-GDP ratio of 39.6% in 2019 with Domínguez as head of the country's economic team. He was also able to raise the Philippines’ revenue effort to 16.1% of GDP in 2019.

During the pandemic, Domínguez spearheaded the funding of the country's procurement of vaccines and direct responses to the economic downturn. The Philippines’ COVID-19 response program amounted to about PHP3 trillion, equivalent to 15.6 percent of GDP.

To help businesses negatively affected by the pandemic, Domínguez pushed for the enactment of COVID-19 recovery measures. These include the Corporate Recovery and Tax Incentives for Enterprises Act (CREATE), which gave tax breaks to 99 percent of business enterprises; and the Financial Institutions Strategic Transfer Act (FIST) to help relieve the banking system from bad loans and other non-performing assets.

Domínguez was conferred by the President of the Philippines with the Order of Lakandula with the Rank of Grand Cross (Bayani) for his service to the nation. The Order of Lakandula is awarded to distinguished persons of political and civic merit.

Domínguez was also conferred by the Emperor of Japan with the Grand Cordon of the Order of the Rising Sun for exercising outstanding leadership in promoting cooperation between Japan and the Philippines. The recognition is the highest ordinary order conferred in Japan.

Political offices
Preceded by Ernesto M. Maceda as Minister of Natural Resources	Secretary of Environment, Energy, and Natural Resources; 1986–1987	Succeeded by Fulgencio S. Factoran
Preceded by Ramon V. Mitra Jr.	Secretary of Agriculture; 1987–1989	Succeeded by Senen C. Bacani
Preceded by Cesar Purisima	Secretary of Finance; 2016–2022	Succeeded by Benjamin Diokno
