= Janet Abuel =

Filipino lawyer and politician

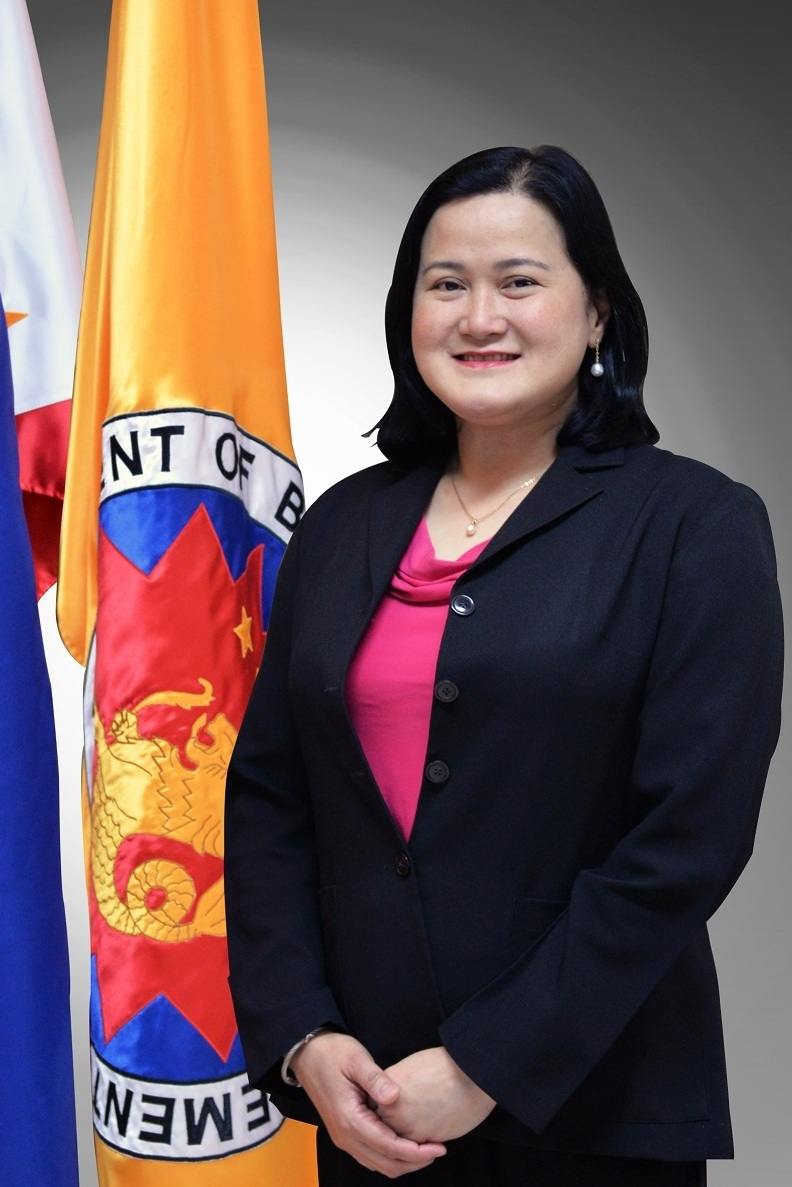

Secretary of Budget and Management Officer in Charge
- In office March 5, 2019 – August 5, 2019
- President: Rodrigo Duterte
- Preceded by: Benjamin Diokno
- Succeeded by: Wendel Avisado

Personal details
- Born: Janet Braganza Abuel; March 13, 1971 (age 55) Dagupan, Pangasinan
- Education: Saint Louis University (BS); University of the Cordilleras (LLB); Lee Kuan Yew School of Public Policy (MPP); University of Sydney (LL.M)
- Occupation: Lawyer, Certified public accountant, Civil servant

Janet Braganza Abuel (born March 13, 1971) is a Filipino lawyer, accountant and public servant who, from March to August 2019, served as acting secretary of the Department of Budget and Management in the Duterte administration following the appointment of former-Budget Secretary Benjamin Diokno to the Bangko Sentral ng Pilipinas (BSP).

== Early life and education ==
Abuel was born on March 13, 1971, in Dagupan, Pangasinan, the fourth of seven children of Miguel and Fausta Abuel. She went to Dominican School in Dagupan for her elementary and secondary schooling.

From 1987 to 1991, she attended Saint Louis University in Baguio where she graduated with a Bachelor of Science in Commerce degree major in accounting. She passed the certified public accountant examinations in 1991.

For her post graduate studies, she attended Baguio Colleges Foundation (currently known as the University of the Cordilleras) where she earned a Bachelor of Laws degree in 1998. A single working mother, she attended night school from 5 to 8 p.m. after office work. In the 1998 bar examinations, she placed first with a 91.80% rating, becoming the first bar topnotcher of the university. When interviewed in 2000 about her experiences after topping the bar, she said:

The short term benefits include prestige and celebrity status. There were a lot of job offers from prestigious law and auditing firms, and from the government. I learn a little more now and can afford luxuries like buying my own books. I used to photocopy law books before because I was the sole breadwinner and it was necessary for me to make both ends meet.

— Janet Abuel, On top of the bar, Manila Standard

From 2004 to 2005, she went to Lee Kuan Yew School of Public Policy under a scholarship and earned a Master's degree in public policy. She was also awarded a certificate of completion in 2014 from the John F. Kennedy School of Government in Harvard University where she attended the Executive Education Program on Driving Government Performance. She also holds a Master of Laws degree from University of Sydney in Australia.

== Career ==
Abuel first started her career as a new accounts clerk at the Makati branch of BPI Family Bank from 1993 to 1994. In 1995, she was an accounting clerk of the Baguio Sub-Regional Office of the Home Development Mutual Fund. In 1996, she was an accountant of the Sto. Niño Jesus Medical Center in Baguio. Abuel was also a part-time instructor at the University of the Cordilleras College of Law from 1999 to 2010 and authored the handbook Bar Review Methods and Techniques, 2003 Edition.

=== Department of Budget & Management ===
Abuel started working at the DBM in 1996 as a budget analyst of the department's Cordillera Administrative Region office in Baguio. Up until 1999, she worked in the regional office becoming a budget specialist in 1998 and a senior budget specialist in July 1999. A month later, in August, Abuel was promoted to being the director of the department's legal and legislative service in the central office. She was personally offered the position by then-DBM Secretary Benjamin Diokno after he learned that she had topped the bar. At the time, she was the department's youngest director IV, the highest level among government directors. She then became the regional director, in 2002, of DBM's Ilocos Region office in San Fernando, La Union.

After serving for about a decade in the regional office, she was appointed by then-President Benigno Aquino III as assistant secretary of the department, replacing Ruby Alvarez. As assistant secretary, Abuel handled assignments of assisting the Undersecretary for Operations in the supervision of the bureau in charge of policy formulation and local government units (LGUs) concerns, the Project Management Office on LGU Public Financial Management, and overseeing the regional offices.

For a period, she took the reins of the Corporate Affairs Group, particularly supervising the Administrative Service, and the Financial and Management Service. She also directly supervised the Legislative Liaison Office. From 2012 to October 2015, she was the chair of the Bids and Awards Committee (BAC).

She became an undersecretary in March 2015. As undersecretary, she was designated to head the establishment of the Office of the Comptroller General, and oversee the bureau in charge of policy formulation and LGU concerns, the PMO on LGU PFM, and supervise the regional offices.

Following the death of BSP Governor Nestor Espenilla Jr. in February 2019, then-Secretary Diokno was appointed to serve his unexpired term. After that, Abuel was named officer-in-charge of the department. In a cabinet meeting held in April 2019, President Duterte "verbally" appointed Abuel as acting secretary amid the 45-day appointment ban ahead of the 2019 Philippine general election.

== Awards ==
- 1999 DBM Sariling Sikap Awards
- Ten Outstanding Citizens of Baguio CIty
