= Nestor Espenilla =

4th governor of the Bangko Sentral ng Pilipinas (2017–2019)

Nestor A. Espenilla Jr.
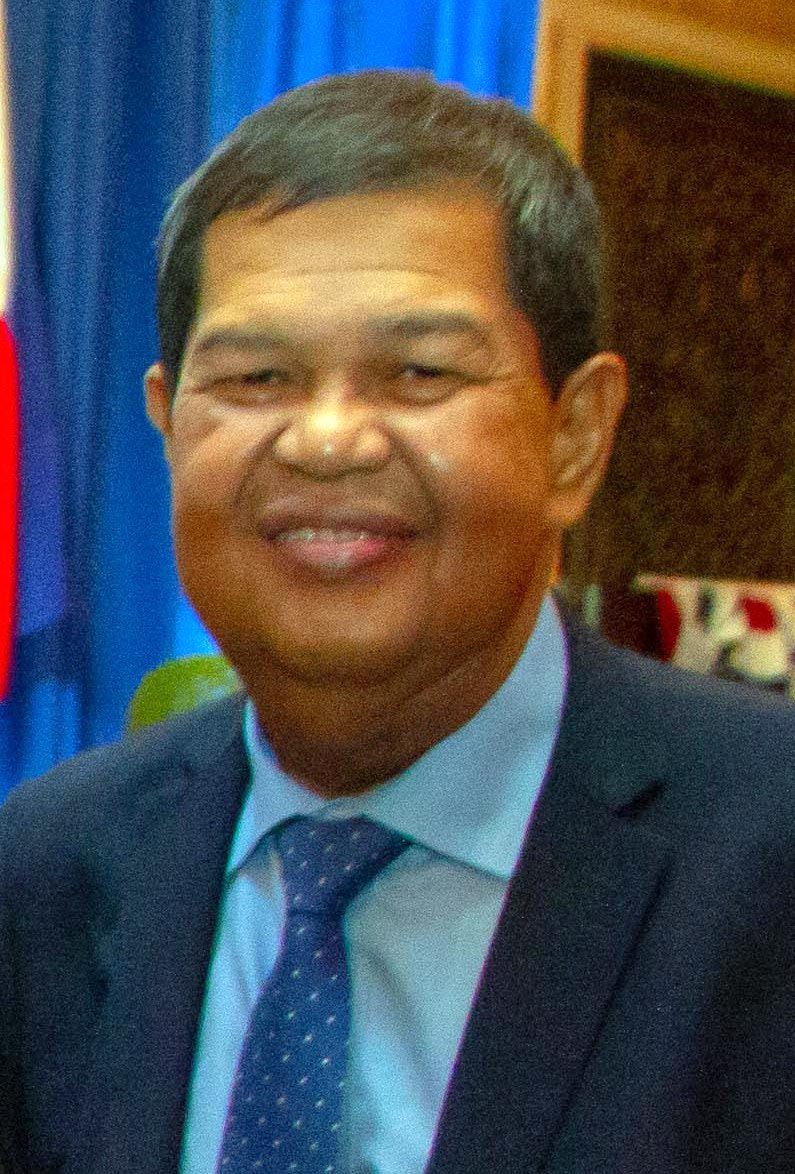

4th Governor of the Bangko Sentral ng Pilipinas
- In office July 4, 2017 – February 23, 2019
- President: Rodrigo Duterte
- Deputy: Diwa Guinigundo; Ma. Almasara Tuaño-Amador; Chuchi Fonacier
- Preceded by: Amando Tetangco Jr.
- Succeeded by: Benjamin Diokno

Personal details
- Born: Nestor Aldave Espenilla Jr. October 12, 1958 Manila, Philippines
- Died: 23 February 2019 (aged 60) Manila, Philippines
- Cause of death: Tongue cancer
- Spouse: Maria Teresita Festin
- Children: 3
- Education: University of the Philippines Diliman; National Graduate Institute for Policy Studies (GRIPS)
- Profession: Banker, economist

Nestor Aldave Espenilla Jr. (12 October 1958 – 23 February 2019) was a Filipino banker who served as the fourth governor of the Bangko Sentral ng Pilipinas (BSP) from 2017 until his death in 2019. He began working for the BSP in 1981 and was a deputy governor under his predecessor Amando Tetangco Jr.

== Early life ==
Espenilla was born in Manila to Nestor Espenilla Sr. and Arminda Aldave-Espenilla, the only son in a family of five. When he was 10 years old, his mother established a small rural bank, the Rural Bank of San Jacinto (Masbate), Inc., which grew and now has several branches in the province and in neighboring Sorsogon Province. The bank was managed by his three sisters.

== Education ==
Espenilla graduated from the Ateneo de Manila High School in 1977. He then graduated with a Bachelor of Science degree in Business Economics (magna cum laude) in 1981 and his Master of Business Administration honors degree from the University of the Philippines Diliman in 1982. He obtained his Master of Science degree in Policy Science from the National Graduate Institute for Policy Studies (GRIPS) in Tokyo, Japan in 1988.

He attempted to become a lawyer after his graduating in his undergraduate program and took evening classes of the University of the Philippines College of Law, but he quit his law studies weeks later because of his full-time job in BSP.

== Career ==
After graduating from the University of the Philippines in 1981, Espenilla was hired by the Bangko Sentral ng Pilipinas as a debt analyst. Known to his co-workers as "Nesting", Espenilla steadily rose through the ranks, earning his stripes in economic research and international operations, before he was appointed by Philippine president Gloria Macapagal Arroyo in 2005 as deputy governor for supervision and examination sector under the administration of his predecessor Amando Tetangco Jr. When Philippine president Benigno S. Aquino III took office in 2010, Tetangco's term would have expired, but Aquino reappointed him and his deputies—including Espenilla—to their positions.

=== BSP deputy governor ===
As deputy governor, Espenilla was responsible for the BSP's regulatory policies with regards to the entire banking system, playing the "bad cop" whenever it deals with banks that were revealed to have violated regulations. Among his accomplishments as deputy governor include the closure of Banco Filipino, a major savings and loan bank owned by the Aguirre family, on 17 March 2011 after an investigation by Espenilla's team revealed that depositors' money had been diverted to entities controlled by the bank's owners and officers. Espenilla also ordered the investigation into and closure of LBC Development Bank, owned by the Araneta family that established courier firm LBC Express. It was revealed in the investigation that the bank incurred P6.09 billion in deposit liabilities after a build-up of cash advances to its affiliate businesses.

Espenilla also sat as the BSP's representative to the Anti-Money Laundering Council, the Philippines' financial intelligence, financial counter-terrorism and anti-money laundering agency. He sat as chairperson of the council on behalf of Tetangco. One of his key accomplishments as head of the council was the filing of a petition in the Court of Appeals to freeze the bank accounts of former Marcos administration Trade and Industry minister Roberto Ongpin after it was revealed that he allegedly made two behest loans with the Development Bank of the Philippines totaling P660 million to buy the government-owned bank's shares in Philex Mining Corporation. The Appellate Court froze 100 of Ongpin's bank accounts on 6 December 2012 but lifted the freeze order on 7 May 2013.

In August 2016, Espenilla ordered the P1 billion-fine against Rizal Commercial Banking Corporation, which is owned by the Yuchengco family. The bank was involved in the 2016 Bangladesh Bank robbery, having been used by hackers to launder and withdraw $81 million that was stolen from Bangladesh Bank's account in the Federal Reserve Bank of New York.

Espenilla also led the establishment of the National Retail Payment System (NRPS), a framework which will be used for the Philippines' gradual shift from cash and check-based payments to electronic means. The shift is expected to improve efficiency in transactions among and between banks and other financial institutions involved in financial technology.

=== BSP governor ===
Philippine President Rodrigo Duterte appointed Espenilla as BSP governor on 8 May 2017 and assumed office on 3 July 2017. He bested other contenders for the position, including former Philippine President Gloria Macapagal Arroyo, fellow BSP deputy governor Diwa Gunigundo, EastWest Bank vice chairman and CEO Antonio Moncupa Jr. and former Trade and Industry Secretary Peter Favila. His selection was hailed as a wise decision by several key personalities in the government and the banking sector, including Tetangco, Finance Secretary Carlos Dominguez III, Security Bank president and CEO Alfonso Salcedo Jr. and ING Bank Manila senior economist Joey Cuyegkeng. Under his leadership, the BSP continued to push reforms under the "Continuity Plus Plus" theme. Digitalization of the country's retail payment system was also spearheaded under his term. In 2018, under his tenure, Congress passed an act amending the BSP Charter. On February 16, 2019, almost a week before his death, President Duterte signed the act into law effectively "strengthening BSP's capacity to foster price and financial stability".

== Personal life ==
Espenilla was married to Maria Teresita Festin-Espenilla, a microfinance specialist for the United States Agency for International Development (USAID), and had a daughter and two sons with her. They met at the University of the Philippines while studying for their master's degrees. Espenilla enjoyed his free time either playing golf, bowling, badminton or going to the gym. He also liked going on long walks with his dog (potentially on the beach), watching TV or movies and cooking for his family on Sundays.

== Death ==
Espenilla died on 23 February 2019 at the age of 60 due to complications brought about by tongue cancer. He had been undergoing cancer treatment for more than a year.

Government offices
Preceded by Amando Tetangco Jr.	Governor of the Bangko Sentral ng Pilipinas; 2017–2019	Succeeded by Benjamin Diokno
