= Insurance Commission =

State agency of the Philippines in charge of regulating the insurance industry

- Komisyon sa Pasiguro

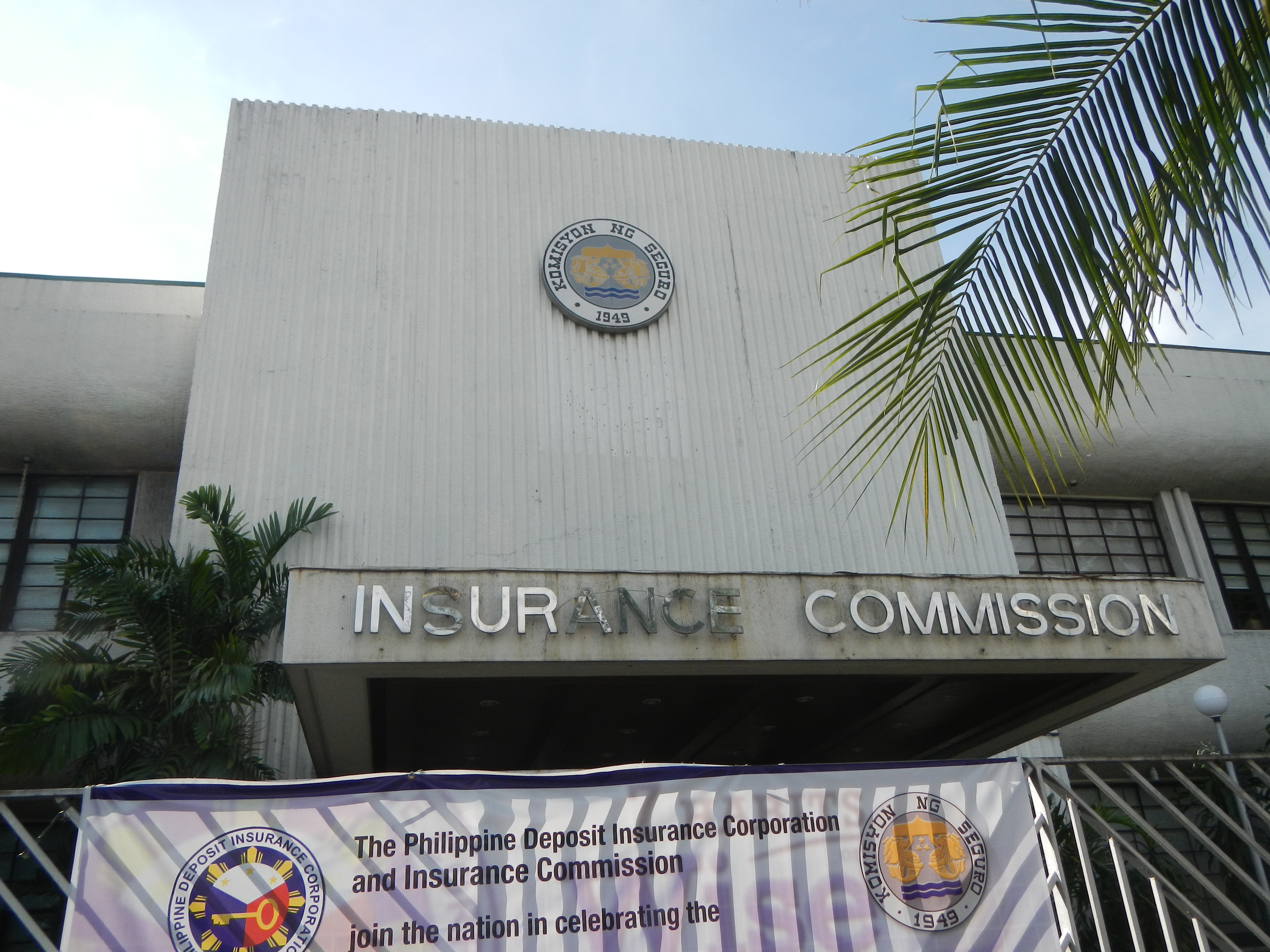
- IC building

Agency overview
- Formed: January 3, 1949; 77 years ago
- Jurisdiction: Philippines
- Headquarters: 1071 United Nations Avenue, Ermita, Manila, Philippines
- Agency executive: Ermar U. Benitez, Chairperson
- Parent department: Department of Finance
- Website: www.insurance.gov.ph

The Insurance Commission (IC; Filipino: Komisyon sa Pasiguro) is a government agency in the Philippines that regulates and supervises the insurance, pre-need, and health maintenance organization sectors. The agency operates under the Department of Finance and issues licenses to qualified entities within the financial sector. The organization protects the rights of policyholders by establishing rules for fair business practices and resolving consumer disputes.

The regulatory jurisdiction of the organization encompasses life insurance companies and non-life insurance companies. The authority extends equally to mutual benefit associations and trusts for charitable uses. The state subsequently expanded this jurisdiction to include pre-need companies and health maintenance organizations. The regulatory body works to protect the financial interests of policyholders while promoting the economic stability of all regulated corporate entities. Executive leadership rests with the Insurance Commissioner who oversees administrative operations and enforces industry standards nationwide. The official head office of the commission sits along United Nations Avenue in the city of Manila.

== History ==
The concept of commercial insurance did not exist within the Philippines during the pre-Hispanic era. Families and indigenous tribes bore the financial burden of unexpected loss collectively without formal indemnification mechanisms. The Spanish colonial administration eventually introduced formal commercial insurance contracts to the territory. The legal framework governing these early financial contracts resided within Book II of the Spanish Code of Commerce and Book IV of the Spanish Civil Code of 1889. The local market relied heavily on foreign colonial entities to manage risk transfer during this period.

Domestic corporate entities began entering the local insurance market at the beginning of the twentieth century. The Yek Tong Lin Insurance Company achieved the status of the first domestic non-life insurance provider upon its formal organization in 1906. The Insular Life Assurance Company Limited followed shortly after to become the first domestic life insurance enterprise in 1910. The Philippine Assembly responded to the rapid expansion of this local market by enacting Act No. 2427 on December 11, 1914. This defining statute became known widely as the Insurance Act and took formal effect on July 1, 1915. The legislation officially repealed the outdated insurance provisions of the Spanish Code of Commerce. The enactment of Act No. 2427 marked the inception of the national regulatory body. The law explicitly designated the Insular Treasurer as the Insurance Commissioner ex officio. The government established the Insurance Division within the Bureau of Treasury to manage the daily supervision of the expanding industry.

The administrative location of the regulatory body shifted multiple times throughout the twentieth century. The national government detached the Insurance Division from the Bureau of Treasury and attached it to the Bureau of Banking during the Second World War. The division reverted to the Bureau of the Treasury immediately following the conclusion of the war. The state recognized the practical advantage of merging the division with the Bureau of Banking again in 1947 to consolidate financial regulatory supervision The national government eventually decided to establish an independent office dedicated entirely to insurance administration as the domestic industry prospered. Republic Act No. 275 formally renamed the Bureau of Banking to the Office of the Insurance Commissioner on January 3, 1949. The same legislative act changed the title of the Bank Commissioner to Insurance Commissioner and established the supporting position of Assistant Insurance Commissioner.

== Legal statutes ==
President Ferdinand Marcos promulgated Presidential Decree No. 612 on December 18, 1974. This executive decree instituted the comprehensive Insurance Code of the Philippines and formally repealed the original Insurance Act of 1914. The administration had previously issued Presidential Decree No. 63 on November 20, 1972 to amend specific operational sections of the older act. This specific 1972 decree officially renamed the Office of the Insurance Commissioner to the Insurance Commission. The government subsequently issued Presidential Decree No. 1460 on June 11, 1976 to consolidate all prevailing insurance laws into a unified legal text. The consolidated legal framework became known as the Insurance Code of 1978 and governed the Philippine insurance industry.

=== Reorganization ===
The regulatory authority of the commission relies upon several foundational legal instruments passed in recent years. Republic Act No. 10607 serves as the primary governing statute for traditional insurance entities. President Benigno Aquino III signed this law known as the Amended Insurance Code on August 15, 2013. The legislation reinforced previous regulatory standards to ensure the economic viability of all operating companies. The law mandated progressive increases in the minimum paid-up capital of insurance firms to protect the insuring public from sudden corporate insolvencies. The statute specifically required insurance providers to increase their net worth every three years until the year 2022.

=== Pre-need ===
Republic Act No. 9829 was enacted on July 27, 2009 to address risks in alternative financial sectors. This statute known as the Pre-Need Code of the Philippines vested the supervision of all pre-need companies in the Insurance Commission.

=== HMOs ===
The regulatory scope expanded even further under the administration of President Aquino III. Executive Order No. 192 transferred the absolute jurisdiction over health maintenance organizations from the Department of Health to the Insurance Commission on November 12, 2015. The executive order noted that insurance companies and health maintenance organizations function under a highly similar financial concept. The concept involves receiving compensation through premiums in exchange for promising certain contractual benefits in the future. The jurisdictional transfer aimed to eliminate administrative redundancy and improve accountability within the executive department. The legal definition of a health maintenance organization under this order identifies it as a juridical entity organized to provide pre-agreed health care services to enrolled members for a fixed prepaid fee. The Department of Health retained authority solely over medical matters such as medical procedures and hospital standards following this structural transfer.

=== Consumer rights ===
Republic Act No. 11765, or the Financial Products and Services Consumer Protection Act provides the commission with extensive consumer protection powers. The law empowers the commission to formulate strict rules protecting financial consumers from unfair business practices and unethical market conduct. The legal mandate requires the commission to implement progressive regulatory policies that conform strictly to international standards. The organization must establish a sound national insurance market while aggressively safeguarding the basic rights of all consumers.

== Regulatory functions and Industry supervision ==
The commission exercises regulatory and supervisory functions over the entire Philippine insurance sector. It required licenses and certificates of authority to life insurance companies and non-life insurance companies. The regulatory body also issues permits to mutual benefit associations and specialized reinsurance companies. The licensing authority covers individual intermediaries including insurance brokers and independent sales agents. It also evaluates all applications for new financial products and approves all insurance policies before companies can sell them to the public.

=== Examination ===
The commission conducts regular comprehensive examinations of the financial condition and business methods of all regulated entities. The financial examiners verify strict compliance with minimum capitalization requirements and mandatory reserve fund limits. The commission strictly enforces the capital build-up program for composite insurance companies operating in the country. A composite insurance company transacting both life and non-life business must maintain a completely separate net worth for each operational unit. The regulatory guidelines required each individual unit to possess a minimum net worth of ₱1.3 billion by December 31, 2022. The commission possesses the legal authority to order non-compliant companies to cease concurrent operations and run-off one of their business units immediately.

=== Quisi-judicial functions ===
The commission exercises quasi-judicial functions to resolve complex financial disputes effectively. It adjudicates claims and complaints involving loss or liability incurred by an insurer under any policy or contract. The original authority established under Presidential Decree No. 63 allowed the commission to adjudicate single claims not exceeding ₱100,000. The modern framework empowers the commission to handle complex claims related to denied health maintenance organization reimbursements. The commission evaluates premium rates imposed by operating companies to determine strict compliance with established actuarial standards and responsible pricing guidelines.

The commission enforces discipline within the industry through its investigative and punitive powers. As a regulator, it can issue immediate cease and desist orders to prevent fraud or financial injury to active plan holders. The commission possesses the authority to examine corporate books of accounts and to impose administrative financial penalties. The commission retains the power to revoke operating licenses for repeated regulatory violations. The organization may appoint independent conservators or liquidators for entities that fail to meet their financial obligations to the public.

=== Rule on fine-prints ===
The provisions of Presidential Decree No. 63 provide strict rules regarding the physical format of insurance policies. The decree requires that insurance policies must be in printed form with specific blank spaces provided for typewritten text. The rule declares that any attached rider or warranty remains entirely non-binding on the insured customer unless its descriptive title is typewritten on the blank spaces of the main policy. The commission enforces these formatting rules to prevent companies from hiding exclusions in small print attachments. Modern consumer protection measures require regulated entities to conduct detailed suitability and affordability assessments before selling complex financial products. The financial service providers must inform consumers of their explicit right to choose alternative providers when a product is tied to a pre-condition. The regulatory rules mandate a mandatory thirty-day notice period for any significant changes in the key features or terms of previously approved financial products. The commission requires all regulated entities to establish a Consumer Assistance Management System to handle grievances efficiently.

== Organizational structure ==
The president of the Philippines appoints the insurance commissioner to lead the commission. The Amended Insurance Code of 2013 fixed the tenure of the commissioner to a single six-year term without the possibility of reappointment. The commissioner acts as the chief executive officer of the regulatory body and holds the exclusive power to issue formal rulings. The commissioner issues circular letters and guidelines necessary for the effective enforcement of all national insurance laws. The commission leadership structure includes multiple deputy commissioners who manage specific operational sectors and provide technical expertise.

The organizational structure divides the commission into specialized technical and administrative divisions to maximize regulatory efficiency. The Financial Examination Group monitors the solvency of regulated companies through rigorous auditing and risk assessment. The Regulation Enforcement and Prosecution Division handles administrative cases and disciplinary actions against erring entities or unlicensed agents. The Claims Adjudication Division manages the resolution of policyholder disputes outside the traditional court system to provide faster redress. The commission operates a dedicated Information Technology Division to maintain computerized licensing systems and publish official rulings directly on the institutional website.

The insurance commissioner serves as an ex-officio member of the Anti-Money Laundering Council. The commissioner collaborates closely with the Bangko Sentral ng Pilipinas and the Securities and Exchange Commission to combat financial crimes within the Philippines. The regulatory agencies coordinate to monitor large cash transactions and prevent the laundering of illicit funds through legitimate insurance contracts.

The commission established a temporary Oversight Committee during the complex integration of health maintenance organizations in 2015. The Secretary of Finance chaired this specific committee while the Secretary of Health and the Insurance Commissioner served as official members. The committee managed the smooth transfer of physical records and regulatory responsibilities from the Department of Health to the Insurance Commission. The committee completed its mandate and dissolved formally in June 2016 as specified by the executive order.

== Sectoral impact ==
=== Microinsurance ===
The commission achieved in expanding financial inclusion through its promotion of microinsurance programs. The regulatory framework introduced in 2006 for mutual benefit associations had contributed to the growth of the domestic microinsurance sector. The framework allowed organizations to design low-cost products tailored specifically for low-income households. The number of citizens covered by microinsurance expanded from a mere 3.1 million before 2008 to 31.1 million by the end of 2014. The commission reported that over 46 million Filipinos held active microinsurance coverage by the first quarter of 2021. The integration of microinsurance products into digital mobile wallets like GCash extended protection to an additional 14.6 million users by the first quarter of 2025. The resulting increase in premium collections brought the national insurance penetration rate to 1.89 percent of the gross domestic product that year. The insurance density also rose to 1,094 pesos per capita during the same period.

=== Morbidity ===
The commission executed partnership with the Actuarial Society of the Philippines to conduct the first industry-wide morbidity study. The two professional organizations signed a formal memorandum of agreement during the 75th anniversary celebration of the commission on January 24, 2024. The study analyzed claims data from health maintenance organizations and health insurance companies covering the specific period from 2018 to 2022. The project aimed to establish reliable national benchmarks for evaluating the reasonableness of premium rates and the adequacy of reserve valuations. The actuaries utilized specialized parameters such as facility utilization rates and average claim amounts during the product evaluation process. The resulting actuarial data provided the government with insights for national health policy development. The study helped standardize the calculation of capital requirements for all entities providing health protection. The commission enforced a strict capital build-up program that stabilized the national insurance market against external economic shocks. The progressive capitalization requirements compelled domestic insurers to strengthen their balance sheets systematically over a full decade.

=== Consumer protection ===
The commission reported a 100 percent resolution rate for consumer complaints during the 2023 operational year. The commission collected ₱518 million in registration and supervision fees during the same year to support its regulatory operations.

The commission established a dedicated hotline for overseas Filipino workers in 2024 through a memorandum of agreement with the Department of Migrant Workers. This communication initiative expedited the resolution of insurance grievances for migrant workers facing distress or sudden medical emergencies abroad.

== Governance ==
=== Regulatory actions ===
The commission conducted regulatory intervention and disciplinary actions. The commission issued a formal cease and desist order against Caritas Health Shield Incorporated on July 8, 2019. The commission responded to numerous public complaints regarding the fraudulent swiping of credit cards by company sales agents. As a regulator, it determined that the corporate management of the health maintenance organization failed to implement timely and effective supervisory interventions to stop the unethical conduct. The explicit order banned the company from selling new health products or transacting new business. The commission mandated the company to continue servicing existing client contracts to protect active plan holders. The commission eventually placed the company under formal receivership and initiated liquidation proceedings. The liquidation order required all claimants to file their benefit claims by March 2, 2026 to participate in the asset distribution. The Catholic charity Caritas Manila subsequently clarified its total lack of affiliation with the company following the public scandal. The religious organization revealed it had won trade name infringement cases against the health provider at the Securities and Exchange Commission prior to the liquidation.

=== Administrative complaint on the Insurance commissioner ===
On July 28, 2026, the Office of the Office of the Ombudsman suspended Insurance Commissioner Reynaldo Regalado. Ombudsman Jesus Crispin Remulla issued a six-month preventive suspension without pay due to severe administrative charges of grave misconduct. The charges cited specific violations of the Code of Conduct and Ethical Standards for Public Officials and Employees alongside the Ease of Doing Business Act. The controversy centered directly on the administration of the Passenger Personal Accident Insurance Program.

This compulsory insurance program requires public utility vehicle operators to secure no-fault insurance covering passengers and drivers. The insurance program provides eligible claimants with up to ₱400,000 in death benefits and ₱100,000 for physical injuries. The Land Transportation Franchising and Regulatory Board oversees the operators while the commission regulates the insurance providers. The formal complaints alleged that Regalado exhibited manifest partiality by approving the accreditation of the Centerstar insurance consortium. The approval proceeded despite serious questions regarding the membership composition of the consortium and the timely filing of its application. The administrative investigation highlighted conflict of interest because Regalado had previously served as senior counsel for the specific law firm representing the accredited consortium. The official Ombudsman order stated that the commissioner failed to respond to legitimate requests for accreditation documents from competing agencies. The official also refused to release records necessary for an appeal and intentionally excluded the legal team of the complainant from a critical regulatory conference.

The primary complainant initiating the administrative charges was identified as SCCI Management and Insurance commission. Regalado submitted official counter-affidavits denying the allegations and asserting that the entire accreditation process followed all established regulatory standards equally. Legal experts emphasized in industry publications that the preventive suspension constituted a precautionary administrative measure to preserve evidence rather than a final judicial conviction of guilt. The law permits such suspensions to prevent high-ranking officials from interfering with witnesses or altering official records during an active investigation. The commission temporarily designated Ermar U. Benitez as officer-in-charge while Regalado is under preventive suspension for six months.
