= Secretary of Environment and Natural Resources =

Cabinet position in the Philippines

Secretary of Environment and Natural Resources of the Philippines
- Kalihim ng Kapaligiran at Likas na Yaman
- Official seal of the cabinet department

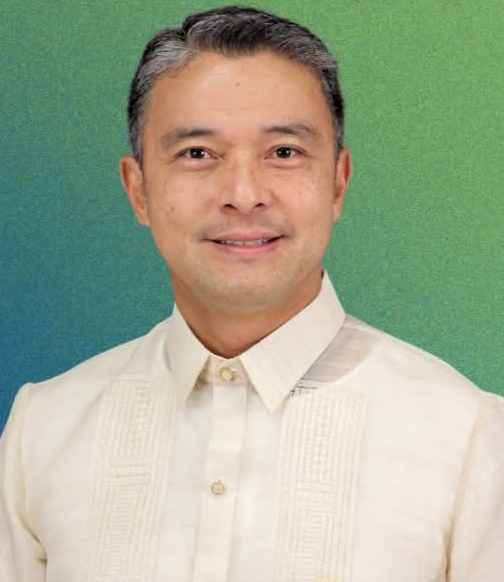
- Incumbent; Juan Miguel T. Cuna (Acting) since February 27, 2026
- Style: Mr. Secretary (informal); The Honorable (formal)
- Member of: The Cabinet
- Reports to: The president
- Seat: Visayas Avenue, Diliman, Quezon City
- Appointer: The president with the consent of the Commission on Appointments
- Term length: No fixed term
- Inaugural holder: Galicano Apacible
- Formation: January 1, 1917
- Website: www.denr.gov.ph

The Secretary of Environment and Natural Resources (Filipino: Kalihim ng Kapaligiran at Likas na Yaman) is the head of the Department of Environment and Natural Resources of the Philippines.

== Functions ==
The following are the functions of a secretary:

- Advise the president on matters under a department's jurisdiction;
- Establish the policies and standards for a department's operation;
- Promulgate rules and regulations;
- Promulgate administrative issuances;
- Exercise disciplinary powers over officers and employees under a secretary;
- Appoint officers and employees in a department;
- Exercise jurisdiction over a department's bureaus, offices, agencies, and corporations;
- Delegate authority to officers and employees;
- Perform other functions provided by law.

== List ==
=== Secretary of Agriculture and Natural Resources (1917–1933) ===
Portrait	Name (Birth–Death)	Took office	Left office	Governor-General
	Galicano Apacible (1864–1949)	January 11, 1917	October 31, 1921	Francis Burton Harrison
	Galicano Apacible (1864–1949)	January 11, 1917	October 31, 1921	Charles Yeater
	Galicano Apacible (1864–1949)	January 11, 1917	October 31, 1921	Leonard Wood
	Rafael Corpus (1880–1960)	November 2, 1921	July 17, 1923	Leonard Wood
	Silverio Apostol; Acting	July 18, 1923	September 6, 1928	Leonard Wood
	Silverio Apostol; Acting	July 18, 1923	September 6, 1928	Eugene Allen Gilmore
	Silverio Apostol; Acting	July 18, 1923	September 6, 1928	Henry L. Stimson
	Rafael Alunan Sr. (1885–1947)	September 6, 1928	January 1, 1933	Henry L. Stimson
	Rafael Alunan Sr. (1885–1947)	September 6, 1928	January 1, 1933	Eugene Allen Gilmore
	Rafael Alunan Sr. (1885–1947)	September 6, 1928	January 1, 1933	Dwight F. Davis
	Rafael Alunan Sr. (1885–1947)	September 6, 1928	January 1, 1933	George C. Butte
	Rafael Alunan Sr. (1885–1947)	September 6, 1928	January 1, 1933	Theodore Roosevelt Jr.

=== Secretary of Agriculture and Natural Resources (1947–1974) ===
Portrait	Name (Birth–Death)	Took office	Left office	President
	Mariano Garchitorena (1898–1961)	July 1, 1947	September 1, 1948	Manuel Roxas
	Mariano Garchitorena (1898–1961)	July 1, 1947	September 1, 1948	Elpidio Quirino
	Placido Mapa	September 21, 1948	September 14, 1950	Elpidio Quirino
	Fernando Lopez (Note: In concurrent capacity as the Vice President.) (1904–1993)	September 14, 1950	May 26, 1953	Elpidio Quirino
	Placido Mapa; Acting	May 26, 1953	December 29, 1953	Elpidio Quirino
	Salvador Araneta (1902–1982)	March 10, 1954	August 13, 1955	Ramon Magsaysay
	Juan Rodriguez	August 18, 1955	March 3, 1960	Ramon Magsaysay
	Juan Rodriguez	August 18, 1955	March 3, 1960	Carlos P. Garcia
	Cesar Fortich	March 3, 1960	September 15, 1961	Carlos P. Garcia
	Jose Locsin (1891–1977); Acting	September 15, 1961	December 30, 1961	Carlos P. Garcia
	Benjamin Gozon	1962	1963	Diosdado Macapagal
	Jose Feliciano	September 16, 1963	1965	Diosdado Macapagal
	Fernando Lopez (1904–1993)	December 30, 1965	January 15, 1971	Ferdinand Marcos
	Arturo Tanco Jr.	January 15, 1971	May 17, 1974	Ferdinand Marcos

=== Secretary of Natural Resources (1974–1978) ===
President Ferdinand Marcos issued Presidential Decree No. 461 on May 17, 1974, creating the Department of Natural Resources from the Department of Agriculture and Natural Resources.

Portrait	Name (Birth–Death)	Took office	Left office	President
	Jose Leido Jr.	May 17, 1974	June 2, 1978	Ferdinand Marcos

=== Minister of Natural Resources (1978–1987) ===
President Ferdinand Marcos issued Presidential Decree No. 1397 on June 2, 1978, converting all departments into ministries headed by ministers.

Portrait	Name (Birth–Death)	Took office	Left office	President
	Jose Leido Jr.	June 2, 1978	July 26, 1981	Ferdinand Marcos
	Teodoro Peña	July 27, 1981	June 30, 1984	Ferdinand Marcos
	Rodolfo del Rosario	July 18, 1984	February 25, 1986	Ferdinand Marcos
	Ernesto Maceda (1935–2016)	February 25, 1986	December 1, 1986	Corazon Aquino
	Carlos Dominguez III (born 1945)	December 2, 1986	January 30, 1987	Corazon Aquino

=== Minister of Environment, Energy and Natural Resources (1987) ===
President Corazon Aquino issued Executive Order No. 131 on January 30, 1987, renaming the Ministry of Natural Resources as the Ministry of Environment, Energy, and Natural Resources.

Portrait	Name (Birth–Death)	Took office	Left office	President
	Carlos Dominguez III (born 1945)	January 30, 1987	February 11, 1987	Corazon Aquino

=== Secretary of Environment, Energy, and Natural Resources (1987) ===
President Corazon Aquino issued Administrative Order No. 15 on February 11, 1987, converting all ministries into departments headed by secretaries.

Portrait	Name (Birth–Death)	Took office	Left office	President
	Carlos Dominguez III (born 1945)	February 11, 1987	March 9, 1987	Corazon Aquino
	Jun Factoran (1943–2020)	March 10, 1987	June 10, 1987	Corazon Aquino

=== Secretary of Environment and Natural Resources (from 1987) ===
President Corazon Aquino issued Executive Order No. 192 on June 10, 1987, renaming the Department of Environment, Energy, and Natural Resources as the Department of Environment and Natural Resources.

Portrait	Name (Birth–Death)	Took office	Left office	President
	Jun Factoran (1943–2020)	June 10, 1987	June 30, 1992	Corazon Aquino
	Ricardo Umali; Acting	July 1, 1992	August 31, 1992	Fidel V. Ramos
	Angel Alcala (1929–2023)	September 8, 1992	June 30, 1995	Fidel V. Ramos
	Victor Ramos	July 1, 1995	June 30, 1998	Fidel V. Ramos
	Antonio Cerilles (born 1948)	June 30, 1998	January 25, 2001	Joseph Estrada
	Antonio Cerilles (born 1948)	June 30, 1998	January 25, 2001	Gloria Macapagal Arroyo
	Joemari Gerochi; Acting	January 25, 2001	March 28, 2001	Gloria Macapagal Arroyo
	Heherson Alvarez (1939–2020)	March 29, 2001	December 13, 2002	Gloria Macapagal Arroyo
	Elisea Gozun	December 13, 2002	August 31, 2004	Gloria Macapagal Arroyo
	Mike Defensor (born 1969)	August 31, 2004	February 15, 2006	Gloria Macapagal Arroyo
	Angelo Reyes (1945–2011)	February 15, 2006	July 31, 2007	Gloria Macapagal Arroyo
	Lito Atienza (born 1941)	July 31, 2007	December 28, 2009	Gloria Macapagal Arroyo
	Eleazar Quinto; Acting	January 4, 2010	February 12, 2010	Gloria Macapagal Arroyo
	Horacio Ramos; Acting	February 12, 2010	June 30, 2010	Gloria Macapagal Arroyo
	Ramón Paje (born 1960)	June 30, 2010	June 30, 2016	Benigno Aquino III
	Gina Lopez (1953–2019); Interim	June 30, 2016	May 3, 2017	Rodrigo Duterte
	Roy Cimatu (born 1946)	May 8, 2017	February 18, 2022	Rodrigo Duterte
	Jim Sampulna; Acting	February 18, 2022	June 22, 2022	Rodrigo Duterte
	Joselin Marcus Fragada; Officer in Charge	June 22, 2022	June 30, 2022	Rodrigo Duterte
	Ernesto D. Adobo Jr., CESO I Officer in Charge	June 30, 2022	July 12, 2022	Bongbong Marcos
	Toni Yulo-Loyzaga	July 12, 2022	May 22, 2025	Bongbong Marcos
	Raphael Lotilla (born 1958); Interim	May 23, 2025	February 27, 2026	Bongbong Marcos
	Juan Miguel T. Cuna, CESO I Acting	February 27, 2026	Incumbent	Bongbong Marcos
