= Jun Factoran =

Filipino lawyer (1943–2020)

Fulgencio S. Factoran, Jr.

Secretary of Environment and Natural Resources Secretary of Environment, Energy and Natural Resources (March–June 1987)
- In office March 10, 1987 – June 30, 1992
- President: Corazon Aquino
- Preceded by: Carlos Dominguez III
- Succeeded by: Ricardo Umali (acting)

Deputy Executive Secretary
- In office 1986–1987
- President: Corazon Aquino

Personal details
- Born: Fulgencio Santos Factoran Jr. November 3, 1944 Orion, Bataan, Philippines
- Died: April 5, 2020 (aged 76)
- Spouse: Kaye Mesina
- Children: 4
- Education: University of the Philippines; Harvard University
- Occupation: government official
- Profession: lawyer

Fulgencio Santos Factoran Jr. (November 3, 1943 – April 5, 2020), also known as Jun Factoran, was a Filipino lawyer, politician, human rights activist, pro-democracy activist, and advocate for freedom of the press in the Philippines. Factoran was a key opponent of the Ferdinand Marcos dictatorship. After the restoration of democracy, he served in the Cabinet of President Corazon Aquino as Secretary of Environment and Natural Resources (DENR) from 1987 to 1992. In 2018, Factoran was identified as a Motu Proprio victim of human rights violations during the Martial Law era by the Human Rights Victims Claims Board.

== Early life and education ==
Fulgencio Santos Factoran was born on November 3, 1943, in Orion, Bataan to Fulgencio Factoran Sr. and Gloria Santos.

Factoran received both his Bachelor of Arts in humanities and Bachelor of Laws degrees from the University of the Philippines, where he was valedictorian of his law class. He then completed a Master of Law at Harvard Law School in the United States. A longtime lawyer, he was the managing partner of Factoran & Associates Law Offices in Manila.

== Human rights advocacy during martial law ==
During the martial law under Ferdinand Marcos, Factoran and other human rights lawyers, including Jejomar Binay, formed the Movement of Attorneys for Brotherhood, Integrity, and Nationalism (MABINI) which opposed President Marcos' dictatorship.

== Government service ==
In the aftermath of the 1986 People Power Revolution which ousted Marcos, Factoran was appointed as deputy executive secretary to President Corazon Aquino from March 1986 to 1987.

He then served as Secretary of Environment and Natural Resources (Philippines) (DENR) in President Aquino's Cabinet from 1987 until 1992. During his tenure as DENR Secretary, Factoran revoked many of the logging concessions that had been awarded during Marcos' rule. He created new programs to promote reforestation efforts and reverse the extensive deforestation in the Philippines. He also transferred stewardship of forests to local residents and communities. Factoran opened the DENR archives to journalists, including Marites Vitug for her 1993 book "Power from the Forest: The Politics of Logging" to expose the abuses of the country's natural resources during the Marcos regime.

== Later career ==
He later served in leadership positions at several government-run corporations, including the National Electrification Administration and the Philippine National Oil Company.

Factoran had served on the board of directors for Rappler, a major Filipino online news site from 2018 until his death in 2020. He was also a member of the board for the Center for Media Freedom and Responsibility.

== Death ==
Factoran died from a longtime illness on April 5, 2020, at the age of 76. He was predeceased by his wife, Kaye Mesina, and survived by their four children, Yazmin, Gertrude Anne, Fulgencio III, and Roberto Carlo.
