= Amando Tetangco Jr. =

Filipino banker

Amando M. Tetangco Jr.
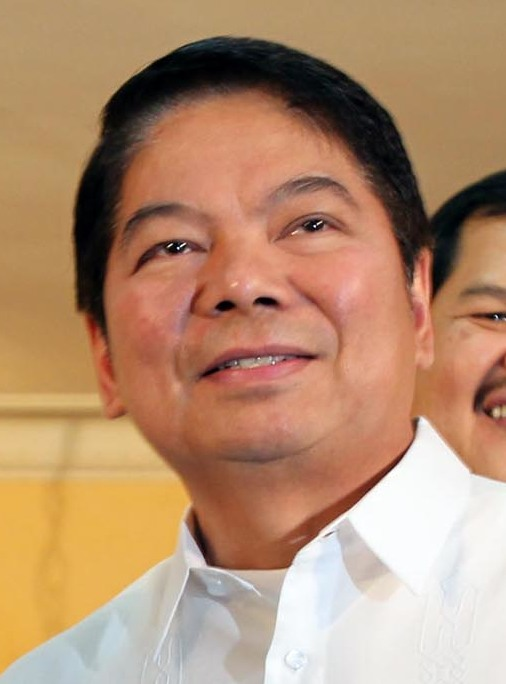
- Tetangco in 2010

3rd Governor of the Bangko Sentral ng Pilipinas
- In office July 3, 2005 – July 3, 2017
- President: Gloria Macapagal Arroyo; Benigno Aquino III; Rodrigo Duterte
- Deputy: Armando Suratos; Diwa Guinigundo; Nestor Espenilla Jr. Juan de Zuñiga Jr.
- Preceded by: Rafael Buenaventura
- Succeeded by: Nestor Espenilla Jr.

Personal details
- Born: Amando Maglalang Tetangco Jr. November 14, 1952 (age 73) Apalit, Pampanga, Philippines
- Spouse: Elvira Ma. Plana
- Children: 3
- Education: Don Bosco Academy, Pampanga
- Alma mater: Ateneo de Manila University, University of Wisconsin–Madison
- Profession: Banker

Amando Maglalang Tetangco Jr. (born November 14, 1952) is a Filipino banker, who served as the third Governor of the Bangko Sentral ng Pilipinas (BSP). He was the first BSP governor to serve two terms, having been first appointed to the office by Philippine president Gloria Macapagal Arroyo on July 3, 2005, and reappointed on July 31, 2011, by President Benigno Aquino III to serve another six-year term.

== Early life and education ==
Born on November 14, 1952 to Amando Sr. and the former Teodora Maglalang, Tetangco finished elementary and high school at the Don Bosco Academy in Pampanga. He went on to pursue his AB Economics degree at the Ateneo de Manila University, where he graduated cum laude; he also took up graduate courses in business administration in the same institution. Later on, as a scholar of the then Central Bank of the Philippines, Tetangco completed his MA in Public Policy and Administration (concentration in Development Economics) at the University of Wisconsin–Madison, Wisconsin, United States.

== Career ==
Before joining the BSP in 1974, Tetangco was connected to the management services division of the accounting firm Sycip Gorres Velayo & Co.

A career central banker, he has occupied different positions in the organization over the span of over three decades. Immediately before he was appointed BSP Governor, he was Deputy Governor in charge of the Banking Services Sector, Economic Research and Treasury.

As BSP Governor in 2005, Tetangco is concurrently the Chairman of the BSP Monetary Board, the Anti-Money Laundering Council, and Philippine International Convention Center; Vice-chairman of the Agriculture Credit Policy Council; member of the Capital Market Development Council, Export Development Council, PhilExport Board of Trustees, Philippine Export-Import Credit Agency; and director of the Philippine Deposit Insurance Corporation, National Development Council, and National Home Mortgage Finance Corporation.

He also represents the country in various international and regional organizations, including the Executive Meeting of East Asia and Pacific Central Banks; ASEAN and ASEAN+3; South East Asia Central Banks; South East Asia, New Zealand and Australia; Center for Latin American Monetary Studies; and Asia-Pacific Economic Cooperation. He is the governor for the Philippines in the International Monetary Fund, the Alternate Governor in the World Bank and in the Asian Development Bank.

He is currently an independent director to various companies, such as SM Investments Corporation (also holding a chairman position), SM Prime Holdings (also holding a Vice Chairman position), Converge ICT, and Shell Philippines.

== Personal life ==
Tetangco is married to Elvira Ma. Plana, with whom he has three children: a son and two daughters. He is an avid shooter and golfer.

== Honors and awards ==
In January 2013, Tetangco has been named Central Banker of the Year for Asia-Pacific by The Banker.

Before this, he was honored in October 2012 by the financial magazine Emerging Markets as the Central Bank Governor of the Year for Asia.

In the same year, he was named as one of the world's six best central bankers for 2012 by the Global Finance magazine, an accolade that had been previously given to him in 2006, 2007 and 2011.

Government offices
Preceded by Rafael Buenaventura	Governor of the Bangko Sentral ng Pilipinas; 2005–2017	Succeeded by Nestor Espenilla Jr.
