= Ben Diokno =

Filipino economist and government official

The Honorable Ben Diokno
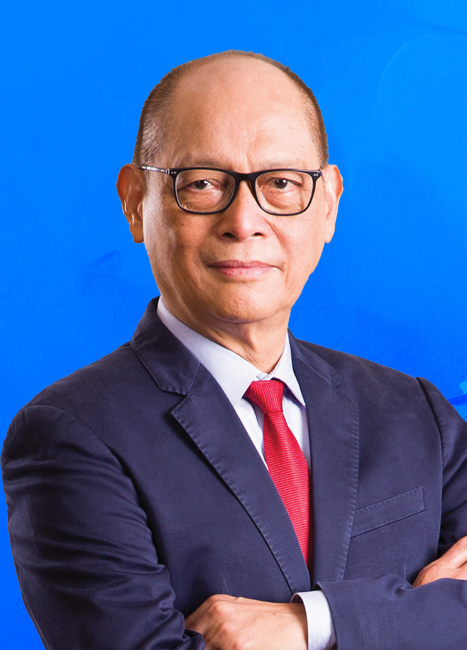
- Official portrait

Member of the Monetary Board of the Bangko Sentral ng Pilipinas
- Incumbent
- Assumed office January 12, 2024
- President: Bongbong Marcos
- Preceded by: Peter B. Favila

32nd Secretary of Finance
- In office June 30, 2022 – January 12, 2024
- President: Bongbong Marcos
- Preceded by: Carlos Dominguez III
- Succeeded by: Ralph Recto

5th Governor of the Bangko Sentral ng Pilipinas
- In office March 4, 2019 – June 30, 2022
- President: Rodrigo Duterte
- Deputy: Francisco G. Dakila, Jr. Eduardo G. Bobier; Chuchi G. Fonacier; Mamerto Tangonan
- Preceded by: Nestor Espenilla Jr.
- Succeeded by: Felipe Medalla

6th and 11th Secretary of Budget and Management
- In office June 30, 2016 – March 4, 2019
- President: Rodrigo Duterte
- Preceded by: Florencio Abad
- Succeeded by: Janet Abuel (Officer-In-Charge)
- In office June 30, 1998 – January 20, 2001
- President: Joseph Estrada
- Preceded by: Emilia Boncodin (Officer-In-Charge)
- Succeeded by: Emilia Boncodin

Personal details
- Born: Benjamin Estoista Diokno; March 31, 1948 (age 78) Taal, Batangas, Philippines
- Children: Charlotte Justine Diokno-Sicat; Benjamin G. Diokno Jr. Jonathan Neil G. Diokno
- Parent(s): Leodegario Diokno y Badillo (father); Loreta Estoista (mother)
- Relatives: Geocinia Grace Tolosa Estoista (maternal first cousin) List: Jose W. Diokno (second cousin); Chel Diokno (second cousin once removed); Ángel Diokno (great-grandfather); Ananías Diokno (granduncle)
- Education: University of the Philippines Diliman (BA, MPA, MEc); Johns Hopkins University (MA); Syracuse University (Ph.D)
- Occupation: Economist, public servant, university professor
- Salary: ▲ ₱41.811 million (2021)
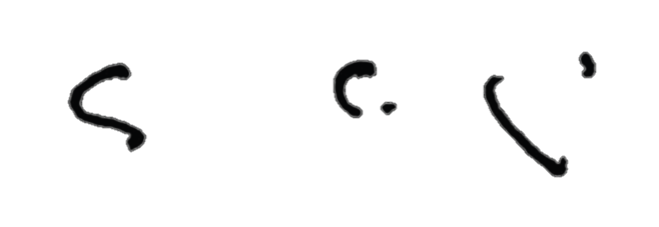
- Signature

Benjamin Estoista Diokno (born March 31, 1948) is a Filipino economist who is one of the six members of the Monetary Board of the Bangko Sentral ng Pilipinas, which conducts the country's monetary policy and supervises its financial system. Diokno previously was the Secretary of Budget and Management under President Joseph Estrada from 1998 to 2001 and under President Rodrigo Duterte from 2016 to 2019. He also was the governor of the Bangko Sentral ng Pilipinas and the chairman of its Monetary Board, as well as ex officio chairman of the Anti-Money Laundering Council, from 2019 to 2022 under President Duterte His last Cabinet-level position was being the Secretary of Finance from 2022 to 2024 under President Bongbong Marcos.

From 2020 to 2021 during the COVID-19 pandemic, Diokno became the highest paid public officer in the Philippines.

== Early life and education ==
Diokno is the son of Taaleños Leodegario Badillo Diokno (lived from c. 1898-August 24, 1982) and Loreta Estoista, Leodegario's second wife after the passing of his first spouse. Benjamin Diokno was born on March 31, 1948, in Taal, Batangas. His oldest brother Bayani Diokno (1943–2018), became a member of the US Navy for nearly three decades. His other siblings are Lucilo, Felipe, Emilio, Lydia (born 1942), Leonor, Amada, and Eduvijis. Leodegario Diokno was the son of Gregorio Diokno (born 1870) and grandson of Ángel Diokno (born c. 1830), the patriarch of the Taaleño surname. Diokno is the second cousin once removed (through common ancestor Ángel Diokno) of Atty. Jose Manuel "Chel" Diokno of the Free Legal Assistance Group (FLAG) and is six degrees apart from the attorney Sen. Jose W. Diokno, who is Atty. Chel Diokno's father and is considered as the father of human rights. Though they are under the large Diokno family that hails from Taal, the other Diokno branch represented by Chel ran and lost against the Duterte administration in the 2019 and 2022 Senate election, the administration Benjamin Diokno served.

Benjamin Diokno finished his bachelor's degree in a bachelor of arts program in public administration from the University of the Philippines Diliman in 1968, and earned his master's degree in Public Administration (1970) and Economics (1974) from the same university. Diokno was later awarded an honorary degree from UP. In 1967, he became a member of the Alpha Phi Beta Fraternity in the University of the Philippines.

He also holds a Master of Arts in Political Economy (1976) from the Johns Hopkins University in Baltimore, Maryland, USA and a Ph.D. in economics (1981) from the Maxwell School of Citizenship and Public Affairs, Syracuse University in Syracuse, New York, US. His dissertation "Public Sector Resource Mobilization through Local Public Enterprises in Developing Countries : Issues, Practices and Case Studies" looked at using local public enterprise as alternative means of mobilizing funds for public purposes.

== Career ==
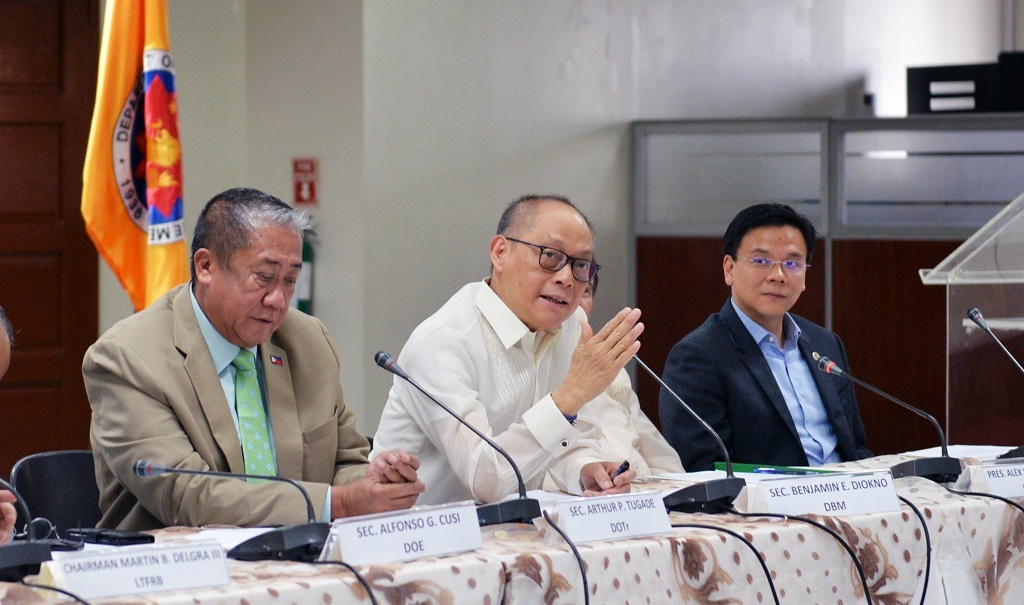
Diokno (center) in 2018

=== Undersecretary for Budget Operations, Department of Budget and Management (1986–1991) ===
Diokno was undersecretary for Budget Operations of the Department of Budget and Management from 1986 to 1991 under President Corazon Aquino. In this capacity, he provided technical assistance to several major reforms such as the design of the 1986 Tax Reform Program, which simplified income tax and introduced the value-added tax (VAT), and the 1991 Local Government Code of the Philippines.

=== Secretary of Budget and Management (1998–2001) ===
During the Estrada administration, Diokno initiated and instituted several reforms that would enhance transparency and improve the efficiency of the delivery of government services. The first major reform instituted was the "what you see is what you get" or WYSWIG policy that is a simplified system of fund release for the General Appropriations Act (GAA). This allowed agency heads to immediately plan and contract out projects by just looking at the GAA, which is available in print and at the DBM website, without waiting for the issuance of an allotment authority. Diokno initiated the reform of the government procurement system (GPS) through the adoption of rapidly improving information and communications technology. He secured technical assistance from the Canadian International Development Agency (CIDA) to help the GPS develop an electronic procurement system along the lines of the Canadian model. By August 1999, the DBM had two documents necessary to initiate reforms in public procurement. In early 2000, Diokno and USAID successfully concluded a substantial technical assistance program for the DBM's budget reform programs, which now included procurement reform. Other budget reforms instituted by Diokno concerned procedures for payment of accounts payable and terminal leave/ retirement gratuity benefits. The release of cash allocation were programmed and uploaded to the department's website while payments were made direct to the bank accounts of specific contractor.

=== Secretary of Budget and Management (2016–2019) ===
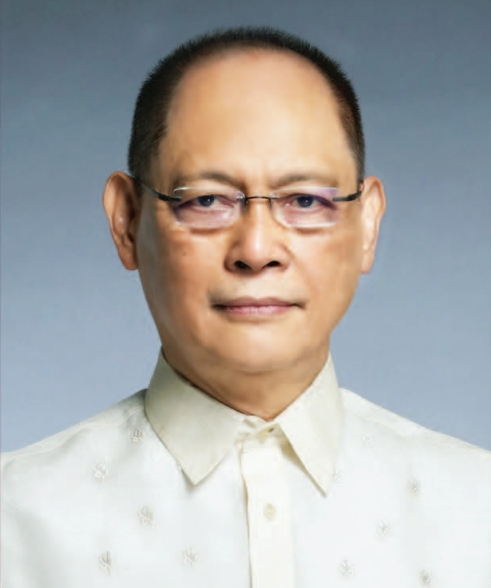
Portrait of Diokno during his term as Secretary of Budget and Management under the Duterte administration from 2016 to 2019.

In his third tour of duty as Budget Secretary, Diokno intended to pursue an expansionary fiscal policy to finance investments in human capital development and public infrastructure. In addition, he seeks for the passage of a Budget Reform Bill to ensure the compliance of future budgets with the pertinent laws of the land. He also aims to re-organize and professionalize the bureaucracy with a Government Rightsizing Act.

=== Governor of the Bangko Sentral ng Pilipinas (2019–2022) ===
On March 4, 2019, President Duterte appointed Diokno as the fifth Governor of the Bangko Sentral ng Pilipinas (BSP), of which he will finish the unexpired term of his late predecessor, Nestor Espenilla Jr. which was supposed to end in July 2023.

=== Secretary of Finance (2022–2024) ===
On May 26, 2022, then President-elect Bongbong Marcos announced that he would nominate Diokno as the next Finance Secretary in his incoming administration, replacing Diokno in the role of the governor of BSP, with Felipe Medalla, who will finish Diokno's unexpired term. Diokno subsequently took his oath at the Malacañang Palace on June 30, 2022, following the inauguration of the former as president.

On January 12, 2024, Diokno was succeeded by Batangas 6th District Representative and Deputy Speaker Ralph Recto as the Finance Secretary, after the latter was appointed by President Marcos on January 11, with Recto taking the oath of office the next day.

=== Monetary Board Member of the Bangko Sentral ng Pilipinas (2024–present) ===
On January 12, 2024, President Marcos subsequently appointed Diokno as one of the six members of the Monetary Board of the Bangko Sentral ng Pilipinas, replacing Peter B. Favila in the position.

== Post-political life ==
Diokno is a professor emeritus of the School of Economics of the University of the Philippines-Diliman. He was Fiscal Adviser to the Philippine Senate. He also was chairman and CEO of the Philippine National Oil Company (PNOC) and Chairman of the Local Water Utilities Administration. He was also chairman of the Board of Trustees of the Pamantasan ng Lungsod ng Maynila (City University of Manila).

Diokno writes a column for BusinessWorld, Southeast Asia's first daily business newspaper.

Government offices
Preceded by Nestor Espenilla, Jr.	Governor of the Bangko Sentral ng Pilipinas; 2019–2022	Succeeded by Felipe Medalla
Political offices
Preceded by Emilia Boncodin; Acting	Secretary of Budget and Management; 1998–2001	Succeeded by Emilia Boncodin
Preceded by Florencio Abad	Secretary of Budget and Management; 2016–2019	Succeeded by Janet Abuel; Officer-in-charge
Preceded by Carlos Dominguez III	Secretary of Finance; 2022–2024	Succeeded by Ralph Recto
