= Securities and Exchange Commission (Philippines) =

Government agency in the Philippines

- Komisyon sa mga Panagot at Palitan

Agency overview
- Formed: October 26, 1936; 89 years ago
- Jurisdiction: Philippines
- Headquarters: 7907 Makati Avenue, Bel-Air, Makati, Metro Manila, Philippines
- Motto: Your gateway to doing business in the Philippines
- Agency executive: Francis E. Lim, Chairperson
- Parent department: Department of Finance
- Key document: The Securities Regulation Code
- Website: www.sec.gov.ph

The Securities and Exchange Commission (SEC; Filipino: Komisyon sa mga Panagot at Palitan) is the agency of the government of the Philippines charged with the registration and supervision of corporations and securities, as well as capital market institutions and participants, in the Philippines. The commission promotes investor protection in the Philippines as part of its mandate.

An agency under the Department of Finance, the SEC is headquartered at 7907 Makati Avenue, Barangay Bel-Air, Makati. It has ten extension offices located in Baguio, Tarlac, Legazpi, Iloilo, Bacolod, Cebu, Tacloban, Cagayan de Oro, Davao, and Zamboanga.

== History ==
The SEC was established on October 26, 1936, by virtue of Commonwealth Act No. 83, or the Securities Act, in order to safeguard public interest in view of the local stock market boom at the time. It was created just two years after the United States Congress created the United States Securities and Exchange Commission.

The Commission's operations formally began on November 11, 1936, with Ricardo Nepumoceno serving as its first commissioner. Its functions then largely revolved around the registration of securities, analysis of every registered security, evaluation of the financial condition and operations of applicants for security issuances, screening of applications for broker’s or dealer’s license, and supervision of stock and bond brokers, and stock exchanges.

The SEC was abolished during the Japanese occupation of the Philippines and was replaced with the Philippine Executive Commission. It was reactivated later in 1947 with the restoration of the Commonwealth Government.

Due to the changes in the business environment, then President Ferdinand E. Marcos reorganized the SEC on September 29, 1975. Under Presidential Decree No. 902-A, the Commission shall have absolute jurisdiction, supervision and control over all corporations, partnerships or associations, who are the grantees of primary franchise and/or a license or permit issued by the government to operate in the Philippines.

In 1981, the SEC was expanded with two additional commissioners and two departments–one for prosecution and enforcement, and another for supervision and monitoring.

In 2000, the SEC was reorganized, as Republic Act (RA) No. 8799, or the Securities Regulation Code, gave greater focus on the Commission’s role in developing the capital market, fostering good corporate governance and enhancing investor protection.

Meanwhile, the Commission’s mandate to champion the corporate sector received a great boost from Republic Act No. 11232, or the Revised Corporation Code of the Philippines (RCC). President Rodrigo Roa Duterte signed the revision of the almost four-decade-old Batas Pambansa Blg. 68 on February 21, 2019, as part of his legislative priorities and 10-point economic agenda, specifically on increasing the economy's competitiveness, and improving the ease of doing business in the country.

== Composition ==
The SEC carries out its mandate and functions under the direction of the chairperson, who concurrently serves as the chief executive officer, together with four commissioners. The current chairperson and commissioners are:

- Francis E. Lim (Chairperson, appointed June 10, 2025)
- Javey Paul D. Francisco (appointed 2018)
- Karlo S. Bello (appointed 2019)
- Mcjill Bryant T. Fernandez (appointed 2022)
- Rogelio V. Quevedo (appointed June 18, 2024 - present)

The SEC operates through four operating departments, four support services departments, three special offices, and nine extension offices, as follows:

Operating Departments

- Company Registration and Monitoring Department (CRMD)
- Markets and Securities Regulation Department (MSRD)
- Corporate Governance and Finance Department (CGFD)
- Enforcement and Investor Protection Department (EIPD)

Support Services Departments

- Human Resource and Administrative Department (HRAD)
- Economic Research and Training Department (ERTD)
- Information and Communications Technology Department (ICTD)
- Financial Management Department (FMD)

Special Offices

- Office of the Commission Secretary (OCS)
- Office of the General Counsel (OGC)
- Office of the General Accountant (OGA)

Extension Offices

- SEC Baguio Extension Office
- SEC Tarlac Extension Office
- SEC Legazpi Extension Office
- SEC Iloilo Extension Office
- SEC Bacolod Extension Office
- SEC Cebu Extension Office
- SEC Cagayan de Oro Extension Office
- SEC Davao Extension Office
- SEC Zamboanga Extension Office
- SEC Tacloban Extension Office
- SEC Laoag Extension Office
- SEC Butuan Extension Office
- SEC Koronadal Extension Office
- SEC Lipa Extension Office
- SEC Ilagan Extension Office

== Functions ==
The major functions of the SEC include the registration and supervision of corporations, including financing and lending companies. It is also charged with the registration of securities, analysis of every registered security, and the evaluation of the financial condition and operations of applicants for security issue.

The SEC is among the few securities commissions in the world that simultaneously acts as a corporate registrar and a securities regulator. Such a dual role allows the Commission a comprehensive view of the business and investment landscape, and for a more coordinated and enabling regulatory environment.

Aside from enforcing the country’s corporation and securities laws, the SEC acts either as a lead or as a support agency in administering and enforcing the following related laws:

- Ease of Doing Business and Efficient Government Service Delivery Act of 2018 (RA No.11032)
- Anti-Money Laundering Act of 2001 (RA No.10365), as amended
- Microfinance Non-Government Organizations (NGOs) Act (RA No.10693)
- Real Estate Investment Trust (REIT) Act of 2009 (RA No. 9856)
- Financial Institutions Strategic Transfer (FIST) Act (RA No.11523)
- Credit Information System Act (CISA) (RA No. 9510)
- Lending Company Regulation Act (LCRA) of 2007 (RA No. 9474)
- Financing Company Act (FCA) (RA No. 8556), as amended
- Investment Company Act (RA No. 2629), as amended, and its Implementing Rules and Regulations (IRR)
- Investment Houses Law (PD No. 129)
- Civil Code of the Philippines (RA No. 386, Title IX - Partnership)
- Retail Trade Liberalization Act of 2000 (RA No. 8762)
- Foreign Investments Act of 1991 (RA No. 7402), as amended
- Omnibus Investments Code of 1987 (E.O. No. 226, Book III)
- Securitization Act of 2004 (RA No. 9267)
- Anti-Dummy Law (Commonwealth Act No. 108), as amended
- Personal Equity and Retirement Account Act of 2008 (RA No. 9505)
- Financial Products and Services Consumer Protection Act (RA No. 11765)

== See also ==
- List of company registers
- List of financial supervisory authorities by country
