= National Tax Research Center =

Philippine government agency

- Pambansang Sentro ng Pananaliksik sa Buwis
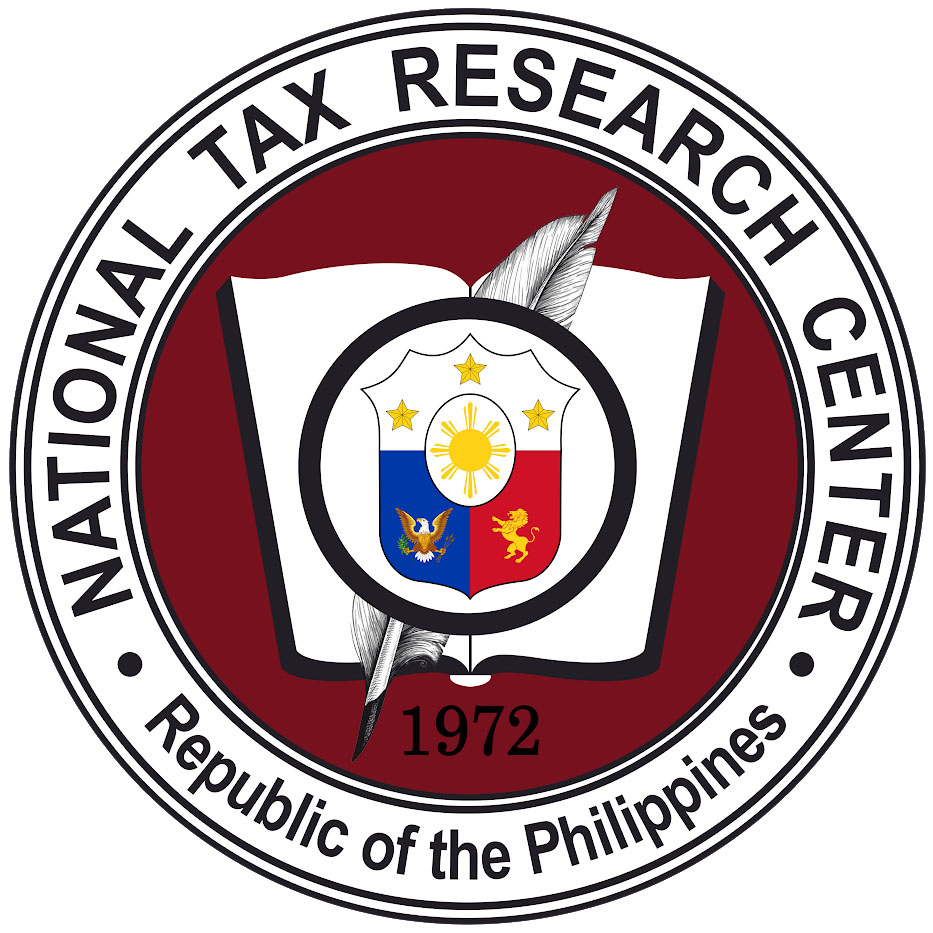

Agency overview
- Formed: May 15, 1959; 67 years ago
- Preceding agencies: Joint Legislative Executive Tax Commission (JLETC); Presidential Decree 74 (1972)
- Headquarters: 8th Floor, EDPC Building, BSP Complex, Roxas Boulevard corner Pablo Ocampo Street, Manila
- Employees: 184 (2026)
- Annual budget: ₱145.616 million (2026)
- Agency executive: Atty. Mark Lester L. Aure, Executive Director
- Parent Agency: Department of Finance
- Website: www.ntrc.gov.ph

The National Tax Research Center (NTRC) (Filipino: Pambansang Sentro ng Pananaliksik sa Buwis) is the principal tax-research and policy-advisory agency of the Philippine government attached to the Department of Finance. Its mandate is to conduct continuing research on taxation to improve the tax system, provide technical assistance to the Department of Finance and Congress enhancing tax policy formulation.

Tax research in the Philippines was institutionalized with the enactment of Republic Act (RA) No. 2211 (May 15, 1959) creating the Joint Legislative Executive Tax Commission (JLETC). One of its identified purposes and objectives is to pass upon all tax measures and revenue proposals. Providing technical support to the Commission Proper was a Technical Staff which was formally organized on April 1, 1960.

On December 6, 1972, through Presidential Decree 74, the JLETC’s Technical Staff was converted into the National Tax Research Center — a single-headed agency under the administrative supervision of the National Economic and Development Authority (NEDA) now the Department of Economy, Planning and Development (DEPDev).

Later, on January 30, 1987, by virtue of Executive Order 127, the NTRC was transferred to be an attached agency of the Department of Finance.

== History and precursor agencies ==
=== Joint Legislative–Executive Tax Commission ===
Republic Act No. 2211, enacted on May 15, 1959, created the Joint Legislative–Executive Tax Commission (JLETC) to undertake a comprehensive review of the Philippine tax system. The law was introduced at a time when the government sought new and more equitable revenue sources to support post-war development and modernization efforts. RA 2211 mandated the Commission to study existing tax laws, evaluate the government’s revenue needs, and recommend reforms aimed at improving efficiency, fairness, and administrative effectiveness.

The Act established a nine-member body composed of representatives from both the Executive and Legislative branches, with appointments from the President of the Philippines, the President of the Senate, and the Speaker of the House of Representatives of the Philippines, including minority-party representation. The Commission was empowered to request data from government offices, summon private individuals, and access records necessary for its studies.

=== Establishment under the National Economic and Development Authority ===
Presidential Decree No. 74 was issued on December 6, 1972, during the early years of martial law from 1972 to 1981, as part of the government’s broader effort to reorganize national institutions. The decree transformed the technical staff of the former Joint Legislative–Executive Tax Commission into a new executive agency called the National Tax Research Center (NTRC).

The measure was introduced to support a systematic restructuring of the country’s tax system, promote public understanding of taxation, and help achieve the administration’s goals of social and economic reform under the “New Society” program.

Under PD 74, the newly created NTRC assumed all functions, personnel, records, and resources of the previous commission staff. It was placed under the National Economic and Development Authority (NEDA) now the Department of Economy, Planning and Development (DEPDev) and headed by an Executive Director.

With this reorganization, tax research and policy analysis became centralized under the executive branch, replacing the earlier legislative–executive structure. The NTRC would go on to serve as the government’s primary institution for tax research and reform initiatives.

=== Reorganization under the Department of Finance ===
Executive Order 127 was signed on January 30, 1987, by then-President Corazon Aquino as part of a broader post-1986 reorganization of the Philippine government. The Order reorganized the former Ministry of Finance — redefining its structure, functions, and administrative responsibilities — and formally attached the National Tax Research Center (NTRC) to the Ministry.

Under the restructured Ministry, the order assigned it the central role of managing the government’s financial resources, overseeing revenue operations across national and local government units, formulating and administering fiscal and tax policies, supervising government borrowing and debt servicing, and coordinating fiscal-related plans with other agencies. The reorganization also established new internal offices for planning, policy research, management information, legal services, and public assistance to improve the efficiency and comprehensiveness of the Ministry’s operations.

By transferring NTRC under the Finance Ministry, EO 127 reinforced the institutional integration of tax policy research into the executive branch’s fiscal management helping guide tax policy formation and coordination between revenue administration and economic planning.

== Mandate and functions ==
Pursuant to Presidential Decree No. 74, the National Tax Research Center (NTRC) is mandated to conduct continuing research on taxation to improve the tax system and raise the level of tax consciousness among our people to achieve economic growth and bring about a more equitable distribution of wealth and income.

Specifically, the NTRC performs the following functions:

- Conducts research on taxation for the purpose of improving the tax system and tax policy;
- Provides comments/position papers on revenue proposals coming from Congress and other government agencies and the private sector;
- Recommends such reforms and revisions as may be necessary to improve revenue collection and tax administration;
- Provides technical assistance to both Houses of Congress and the Department of Finance (DOF) pertaining to taxation through studies, revenue estimate of tax proposals and drafting of bills, among others;
- Publishes and sends tax guides and tax information materials to officials of the executive and legislative branches of government as well as the private sector;
- Serves as Secretariat to the Fiscal Incentives Review Board (FIRB) which acts upon applications for tax subsidy of government-owned and controlled corporation (GOCC), state universities and colleges (SUCs, and other government instrumentalities (GIs) and agencies, and processing and evaluation of application for registration and grant of incentives to projects or activities listed in the Strategic Investment Priority Plan (SIPP) with investment capital of over P1 Billion, and tax incentives of highly desirable projects or a specific industrial activity;
- Serves as Secretariat to the Task Force on the Revision of Fees and Charges which provides technical assistance and monitors the revision of fees imposed by national government agencies (NGAs); and
- Serves as Consultant to the Technical and Executive Committees on Real Property Valuation on the revision of zonal values for tax purposes.

== Organizational structure ==
The NTRC is headed by an Executive Director, assisted by five Deputy Executive Directors.

The Office of the Executive Director (OED) exercises supervision and control over five groups, as follows: Fiscal Incentives Management Group, Monitoring and Evaluation Group, Legal Group, Tax Research Group, and Financial and Administrative Services Group.

=== Fiscal Incentives Management Group ===
- Tax Incentives Division
- Tax Subsidies and Large Investments Division

=== Monitoring and Evaluation Group ===
- Manufacturing Industries Division
- Infrastructure and Resource-Based Industries Division
- Service Industries Division

=== Legal Group ===
- Legal Research and Communication Division
- Legal Management Division

=== Tax Research Group ===
- Special Research and Technical Services Branch
- Direct Taxes Branch
- Indirect Taxes Branch
- Local Taxation Branch
- Fiscal Incentives Branch
- Economics Staff
- Tax Statistics Staff
- Planning and Coordinating Unit (Support to the Office of Directors)

=== Financial and Administrative Services Group ===
- Finance Division
- General Services Division
- Human Resource Management and Development Division
- Management and Information System Division

== See also ==
- Department of Finance (Philippines)
- Fiscal Incentives Review Board
- Taxation in the Philippines
