= Emilia Boncodin =

Filipina politician (1954–2010)

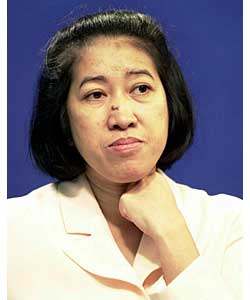

7th Secretary of Budget and Management
- In office January 26, 2001 – July 8, 2005
- President: Gloria Macapagal Arroyo
- Preceded by: Benjamin Diokno
- Succeeded by: Romulo Neri

Secretary of Budget and Management
- Officer in Charge; February 1, 1998 – June 30, 1998
- President: Fidel Ramos
- Preceded by: Salvador Enriquez
- Succeeded by: Benjamin Diokno

Personal details
- Born: Emilia Tabalanza Boncodin; May 28, 1954 Iriga, Camarines Sur, Philippines
- Died: March 15, 2010 (aged 55) Quezon City, Philippines
- Education: Harvard Kennedy School; University of the Philippines Diliman
- Occupation: Accountant, Public servant, University professor

Emilia Tabalanza Boncodin (May 28, 1954 – March 15, 2010) was a Filipina accountant, professor, and public servant. She was the Secretary of the Philippine Department of Budget and Management under the presidency of Gloria Macapagal Arroyo. She also served as a professor at the National College of Public Administration and Governance at the University of the Philippines Diliman until her death in 2010.

Boncodin was a member of the Hyatt 10, a group of Cabinet officials who quit their posts in 2005 during the height of the "Hello, Garci" scandal then rocking the Arroyo administration.

== Early life and education ==
Boncodin was a top-notch student during grade school as valedictorian of Iriga City Central School and valedictorian of St. Anthony College, also in Iriga City. She completed her Bachelor of Science in Business Administration and Accountancy at the University of the Philippines Diliman, College of Business Administration in 1975 and placed 15th in the CPA (Certified Public Accountant) Board Examinations the same year.

She earned the degree of Master in Public Administration at Harvard Kennedy School at Harvard University as an Edward S. Mason Fellow.

== Government career ==
She practically spent her entire career in the Department of Budget and Management. She initially joined the department as a senior fiscal planning specialist. In 1978, she quickly rose to become division chief at the age of 27, then Director of the Office of Budget and Management, and then Officer-in-Charge of the Government Corporations Budget Bureau of the reorganized DBM.

In 1989, she was appointed as an assistant secretary and Undersecretary of DBM in 1991. She joined the cabinet of President Gloria Macapagal Arroyo in 2001.

== Post-government career ==
In 2005, in the wake of the allegations of electoral fraud made against President Arroyo during the heat of the Hello Garci scandal, Boncodin and several fellow cabinet members, known as the Hyatt 10, resigned from their positions.

In 2009, she joined the board of directors of Petron Corporation, a Philippines-based oil refinery as an independent director.

== Awards ==
- 1978 – Most Outstanding Technical Employee (Department of Budget and Management (DBM))
- 1981 – Most Outstanding Division Chief
- 1982 – Outstanding Alumna, UP College of Business Administration
- 1995 – Outstanding Women in Nation's Service Awardee
- 1996 – Dwight Eisenhower Fellow

== Death ==
Boncodin was found to be in need of a kidney transplant in 2005 due to congenital polycystic kidney disease. Her sister was chosen as a potential donor after it was determined that she was a perfect match. But Boncodin requested to have it postponed until the Philippine Congress has passed the budget that year.

On March 10, 2010, she was admitted at the National Kidney Institute after complaining of shortness of breathing. She was diagnosed with anemia and end-stage renal disease. Five days later, on March 15, 2010, Boncodin died from cardiac arrest at the age of 55.
