= Philippine Guarantee Corporation =

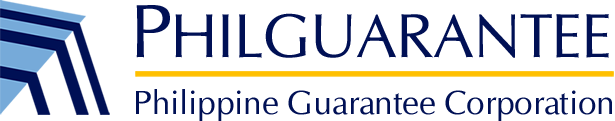
- Type: Government-owned and controlled corporation
- Industry: Finance and guarantee
- Predecessors: Philippine Export–Import Credit Agency (PhilEXIM); Home Guaranty Corporation (HGC)
- Founded: January 31, 1977; 49 years ago (as PhilEXIM); July 23, 2018; 8 years ago (present form)
- Fate: Merger of guarantee functions, programs, and funds with PhilEXIM as the surviving entity and renaming it as PHILGUARANTEE.
- Headquarters: Makati, 1226 Metro Manila, Philippines
- Area served: Philippines
- Key people: Frederick Go (Chairperson); Alberto Pascual (President & CEO)
- Products: Trade credit
- Services: Guarantee programs
- Revenue: ▲ ₱3.908 billion (2021)
- Operating income: ▲ ₱1.370 billion
- Net income: ▲ ₱1.172 billion (2021)
- Total assets: ▲ ₱60.897 billion (2021)
- Total equity: ▲ ₱26.690 billion (2021)
- Owner: Government of the Philippines
- Parent: Department of Finance
- Website: www.philguarantee.gov.ph

The Philippine Guarantee Corporation (PHILGUARANTEE) is the Philippine export credit agency providing trade finance. It is setup as a government-owned and controlled corporation attached to the Department of Finance. Formerly known as the Philippine Export–Import Credit Agency (PhilEXIM), it is the principal agency for state guarantee finance of the Philippines. The primary objective is to perform development financing roles through the provision of credit guarantees in support of trade and investments, exports, infrastructure, energy, tourism, agricultural business, modernization, housing, micro-enterprises, small and medium-sized enterprises and other priority sectors of the economy, with the end in view of facilitating and promoting socio-economic and regional development.

The corporation is the result of the merger and consolidation of five Philippine Guarantee programs and agencies pursuant to Executive Order No. 58, series of 2018.

== History ==
The organization was originally created by Presidential Decree 1080 on January 31, 1977, under the name Philippine Export and Foreign Loan Guarantee Corporation to provide guarantees and facilitate the entry of foreign loans for development projects. On February 12, 1998, its area of operation was expanded and its name accordingly changed to Trade and Investment Development Corporation of the Philippines by Republic Act No. 8494. It was re-titled again through an Executive Order 85 on March 18, 2002, to Philippine Export-Import Credit Agency (PhilEXIM).

On July 23, 2018, President Rodrigo Duterte approved the merger of the Home Guaranty Corporation and PhilEXIM to prevent operational redundancies, standardize policies, facilitate timely approvals, and lower administrative costs. The order transferred the guarantee functions, programs, and funds of the Small Business Corporation and the administration of the Agricultural Guarantee Fund Pool and the Industrial Guarantee and Loan Fund to the PhilExim, the surviving entity in the amalgamation of the five Philippine Guarantee Programs and Agencies. It also authorized capital stock of the PhilExim to be increased from Php10 billion to Php50 billion while the equity contributions of the national government to the Home Guaranty Corporation, IGLF, and AGFP will be transferred to the PhilExim to form part of its paid-up capital. To reflect the centralized nature of the merged guarantee functions, the PhilEXIM was renamed Philippine Guarantee Corporation.
