= Department of Finance (Philippines) =

Executive department of the Philippine government

Coordinates: 14.561466°N 120.987244°E

- Kagawaran ng Pananalapi
- Seal of the Department of Finance

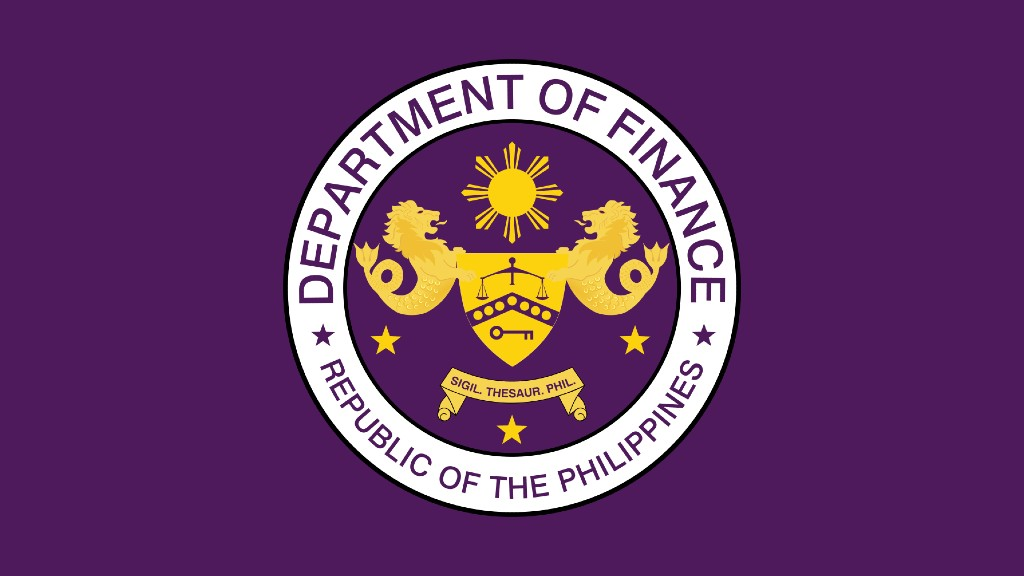
- Flag of the Department of Finance

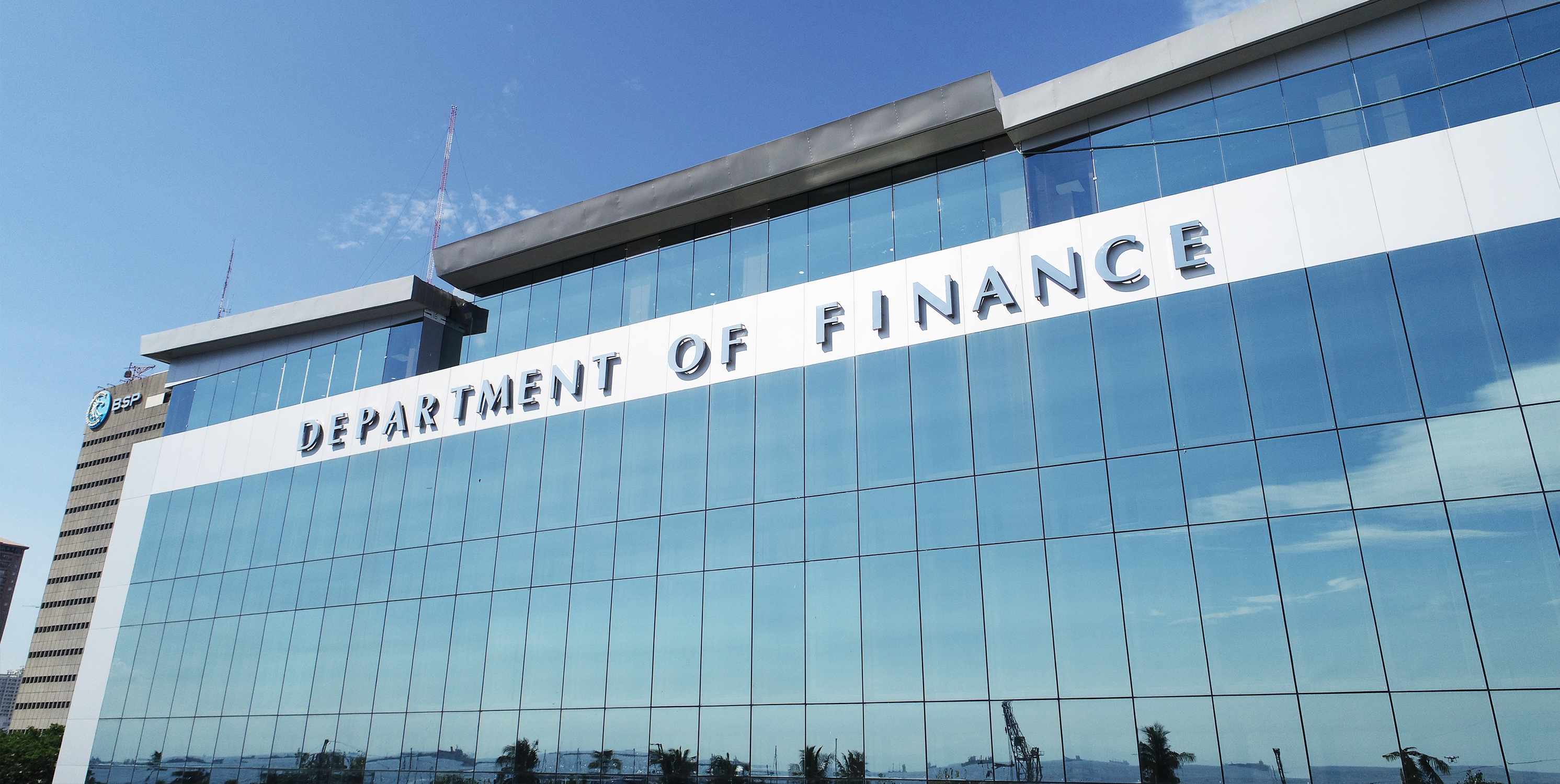
- Department of Finance building

Department overview
- Formed: April 24, 1897; 129 years ago
- Headquarters: DOF Building, BSP Complex, Roxas Boulevard corner Pablo Ocampo Street, Manila
- Employees: 447 (2024)
- Annual budget: ₱16.01 billion (2021)
- Department executives: Sec. Frederick Go, Secretary; Joanne Monique Kabigting, Head Executive Assistant, Office of the Secretary
- Website: www.dof.gov.ph

The Department of Finance (DOF; Filipino: Kagawaran ng Pananalapi) is the executive department of the Philippine government responsible for the formulation, institutionalization and administration of fiscal policies, management of the financial resources of the government, supervision of the revenue operations of all local government units, the review, approval and management of all public sector debt, and the rationalization, privatization and public accountability of corporations and assets owned, controlled or acquired by the government.

== History ==
The Department of Finance was established on April 24, 1897, at the same time that the Revolutionary Government was founded in Naic, Cavite. General Baldomero Aguinaldo was appointed Director of Finance by General Emilio Aguinaldo. The Finance Director became the Secretary of the Treasury under the first constitutional republican government, the Republic of Biak-na-Bato.

In 1901, the Department of Finance and Justice was formally organized by virtue of an act passed by the Civil Service Commission, which was headed by William Howard Taft. Gregorio Araneta was the first Filipino appointed Secretary of Justice and Finance. In 1916, through Reorganization Act No. 2666 of the Philippine Legislature, the Department of Finance and Justice was split into two independent departments.

In 1936, DOF functions relative to the formulation and preparation of the Government's budget were transferred to the newly created Budget Commission. The preparation of income and resource estimates remained with the department. In 1949, the [old] Central Bank of the Philippines was established, Secretary of Finance Miguel Cuaderno relinquished the Finance portfolio to Pio Pedrosa to enable him to serve as Governor of the Central Bank.

In 1970, Minister Cesar Virata, concurrently Prime Minister, was appointed Secretary. In 1974, with the adoption of the parliamentary form of government, the department was changed to a ministry.

In the 1980s, as government policy turned increasingly interventionist in the economy, the Ministry became the voice of caution. It spearheaded the creation of inter-agency committees to rationalize the otherwise free-for-all system of allocating government resources. The Investment Coordination Committee (ICC) was created to rationalize government investments, the Government Corporate Monitoring and Coordinating Committee (GCMCC) to reform the government corporate sector and the Fiscal to reverse the proliferation of the fiscal incentives.

In 1987, the Ministry of Finance was reverted to a department following the ratification of the 1987 Constitution which provided for a presidential form of government. Accordingly, the department was reorganized and its organizational structure, distribution of powers and functions, and coordination mechanisms were streamlined. In 1988, the Value Added Tax was introduced and replaced a complicated sales tax structure.

Through the Department's policies, which resulted in sound fiscal and monetary conditions, the Philippines was hailed as "Asia's Newest Tiger" by various international credit institutions and in 1997, the National Government recorded a budget surplus for the third consecutive year, and the public sector generated its fiscal surplus since the sector started to be monitored in 1985.

In 2004, the Japan Credit Rating Agency (JCRA) maintained its credit rating of "BBB" for the Philippines’ long-term foreign currency and domestic currency long-term senior debts for the government's ability to manage its deficit and macro fundamentals. The rating is two notches higher than those of non-Asian rating agencies such as Moody's, Standard and Poor's, and Fitch.

== Organizational structure ==
The department is headed by the Secretary of Finance, with the following undersecretaries and assistant secretaries.*

- Undersecretary/Chief Economist
- Undersecretary for Fiscal Policy and Monitoring Group
- Undersecretary for Revenue Generation and Local Finance Group
- Undersecretary for International Finance Group
- Undersecretary for Privatization and Corporate Affairs Group
- Undersecretary for Legal Affairs Group
- Undersecretary for Revenue Integrity Protection Service
- Undersecretary for Information Management Service
- Assistant Secretary for Fiscal Policy and Monitoring Group
- Assistant Secretary for International Finance Group
- Assistant Secretary for Privatization and Corporate Affairs Group
- Assistant Secretary for Legal Affairs Office
- Assistant Secretary for Information Management Service
- Assistant Secretary for Policy Development and Management Services Group
- Assistant Secretary/Chief Economist

== Clusters ==
=== Internal offices ===
- Central Administration Office
- Central Financial Management Office
- Financial and Fiscal Policy and Planning Office
- Internal Audit Service
- International Finance Policy Office
- International Finance Operations Office
- Revenue Integrity Protection Service

=== Supervised units ===
The following agencies, corporations and councils are attached to the DOF for policy and program coordination.

==== Bureaus ====
- Bureau of Internal Revenue (BIR)
- Bureau of Customs (BOC)
- Bureau of Local Government Finance (BLGF)
- Bureau of the Treasury (BTr)

==== Agencies and corporations ====
- Central Board of Assessment Appeal (CBAA)
- Insurance Commission (IC)
- National Tax Research Center (NTRC)
- Philippine Crop Insurance Corporation (PCIC)
- Philippine Guarantee Corporation (PHILGUARANTEE)
- Philippine Tax Academy (PTA)
- Privatization and Management Office (PMO)
- Securities and Exchange Commission (SEC)
- Land Bank of the Philippines
