= Leonides Sarao Virata =

Filipino economist

Chairman of the Development Bank of the Philippines
- In office 1970 – July 14, 1976
- Appointed by: Ferdinand Marcos
- Succeeded by: JV de Ocampo

Secretary of Commerce and Industry
- In office 1969–1970
- President: Ferdinand Marcos
- Preceded by: Marcelo Balatbat
- Succeeded by: Ernesto Maceda

Personal details
- Born: April 22, 1918 Imus, Cavite, Philippines Islands
- Died: July 14, 1976 (aged 58) Houston, Texas, United States
- Spouse: Marie Theresa Lammoglia
- Relations: Cesar Virata (half-nephew); Leonardo S. Sarao (relative)
- Children: 2, including Luis Juan
- Parent(s): Luis Virata; Agapita Sarao
- Education: University of the Philippines (LL.B, MBA)
- Occupation: Economist
- Awards: Presidential Medal of Merit (Posthumous)

Leonides Sarao Virata (April 22, 1918 – July 14, 1976) was a Filipino economist. During his lifetime, he served as executive officer of various government and private companies in the country. He was appointed the secretary of the Department of Commerce and Industry from 1969 to 1970 and then chairman of the Development Bank of the Philippines from 1970 till his death in 1976. He hailed from the city of Imus in Cavite province.

He is the father of Luis Juan Virata, the former CEO and President of Philippine Airlines.

== Early life and education ==
Leonides Sarao Virata was born on April 22, 1918, in Barrio Medicion II, Imus, Cavite to Luis Virata and Agapita Sarao. According to family members, the original family name was Bautista. Sometime during the 1896 Philippine revolution, a forebear changed the surname to Virata, taking the name of the character King Virata from the Indian epic Mahabharata. His elder half-brother, Dr. Enrique Topacio Virata (who married Leonor Aguinaldo, daughter of Gen. Baldomero Aguinaldo) was the father of Cesar Virata, the former Prime Minister of the Philippines. Virata was also a relative of Leonardo S. Sarao, an automotive designer and founder of Sarao Motors, the maker of jeepneys known internationally as a symbol of Filipino culture.

Virata obtained his law degree in 1940 and business administration degree, cum laude, in 1941, both courses from the University of the Philippines. He did graduate work at the Harvard University, the University of Chicago, and Northwestern University.

== Career ==
Virata was in the United States when the Philippine Commonwealth was evacuated to America because of the raging war in the Pacific. From 1946 to 1948, he worked as an officer of the Philippine Embassy in the US. After the war, the task of directing the economic research of the newly organized Central Bank of the Philippines in 1949 fell on him. Subsequently, he was appointed the bank’s deputy governor and later, as a member of the Monetary Board. In various United Nations conferences on finance, trade, industry and economics; Virata served in different capacities. He was the adviser to the Philippine delegate to the International Monetary Fund Conference at Washington, DC in 1949 and to the International Monetary Fund and International Bank Conference at Paris, France in 1950. He was a delegate of the Philippines to the Conference of the Consultative Committee in Economic Development in Southeast Asia under the Colombo plan in Ceylon in 1957.

In 1952, he left the government service and joined the Philippine American Life and General Insurance Company as financial vice-president and vice-chairman of its investment committee. Soon, he was accorded the same respect he earned during his service with the government. He was elected either as chairman, president or board member of various companies involved in insurance, food processing, marketing, oil exploration, plywood manufacture, logging, textile, meat packing, glass making, oil refining, banking, telecommunications, etc. His leadership in business and industry reached its peak when he was elected president of the Philippine Chamber of Industries and the Management Association of the Philippines. He was also attributed to the successful transfer of the Manila Electric Company to Filipino control from General Public Utilities of the United States, and the Filipinization of the Philippine Long Distance Telephone Company.

He became a member of the Joint Legislative Executive Tax Commission in 1966. From 1969 to 1970, President Marcos appointed him as secretary of the Department of Commerce and Industry (now the Department of Trade and Industry). In 1970, he was appointed chairman of the Development Bank of the Philippines. Upon assuming his position as chairman of DBP, he ordered the investigation of several major firms that failed to pay the DBP millions of pesos in overdue obligations. Because of this, he was considered as one of the radical chairmen the DBP ever had. Also as head of the DBP, he helped agricultural and industrial enterprises through sound financing schemes. He was also responsible for orienting the institutional objective of development to the countryside to insure that the rural people would enjoy the benefits of economic growth.

== Death ==
On July 14, 1976, Chairman Virata died in Houston, Texas, where he was treated for a lingering illness, leaving his wife the former Marie Theresa "Bebe" Gallardo Lammoglia, and two children, Luis Juan ("Buboy", born February 1954; married Elizabeth Torres Cu-Unjieng) and Giovanna "Vanna" Virata.

JV de Ocampo assumed Virata’s unfinished term at the DBP. In honoring Virata, Chairman de Ocampo said: "In the death of Chairman Leonides Virata, we have lost a esteemed leader in the country’s economic life. He was a force in our development direction. Chairman Virata was an articulate exponent of an economic strategy designed to improve the quality of life of our people, and he gave of himself liberally to this pursuit toward the end. Shortly before his death, he sought to give deeper meaning to the DBP’s countryside development program which he himself initiated in line with national policy."

== Legacy ==
In October 2021, a biography by Butch Dalisay titled O, Ilaw: The Life and Legacy of Leonides S. Virata (lit. 'O, light'), was published by the Cavite Historical Society and launched at the DBP.

== Honors and awards ==
- In 1963, the Philippine Women's University awarded him an honorary doctorate degree.
- In recognition of his long and distinguished service to the country in the fields of banking, finance, trade and industry, which spanned a period of 33 years, President Marcos posthumously conferred on him the Presidential Merit Medal.
- The Leonides S. Virata Memorial School (LSVMS) in Palawan was named after him.
