= Sarao =

Sarao is a surname. Notable people with the name include:

- Leonardo S. Sarao (1921–2001), Filipino automotive businessman
  - Sarao Motors, Filipino automotive manufacturing company
- Manuel Sarao (born 1989), Italian footballer
- Navinder Sarao (born 1978), British stock trader and manipulator
- K.T.S. Sarao, historian, https://en.m.wikipedia.org/wiki/K._T._S._Sarao
