= Antonilo Mauricio =

Filipino businessman

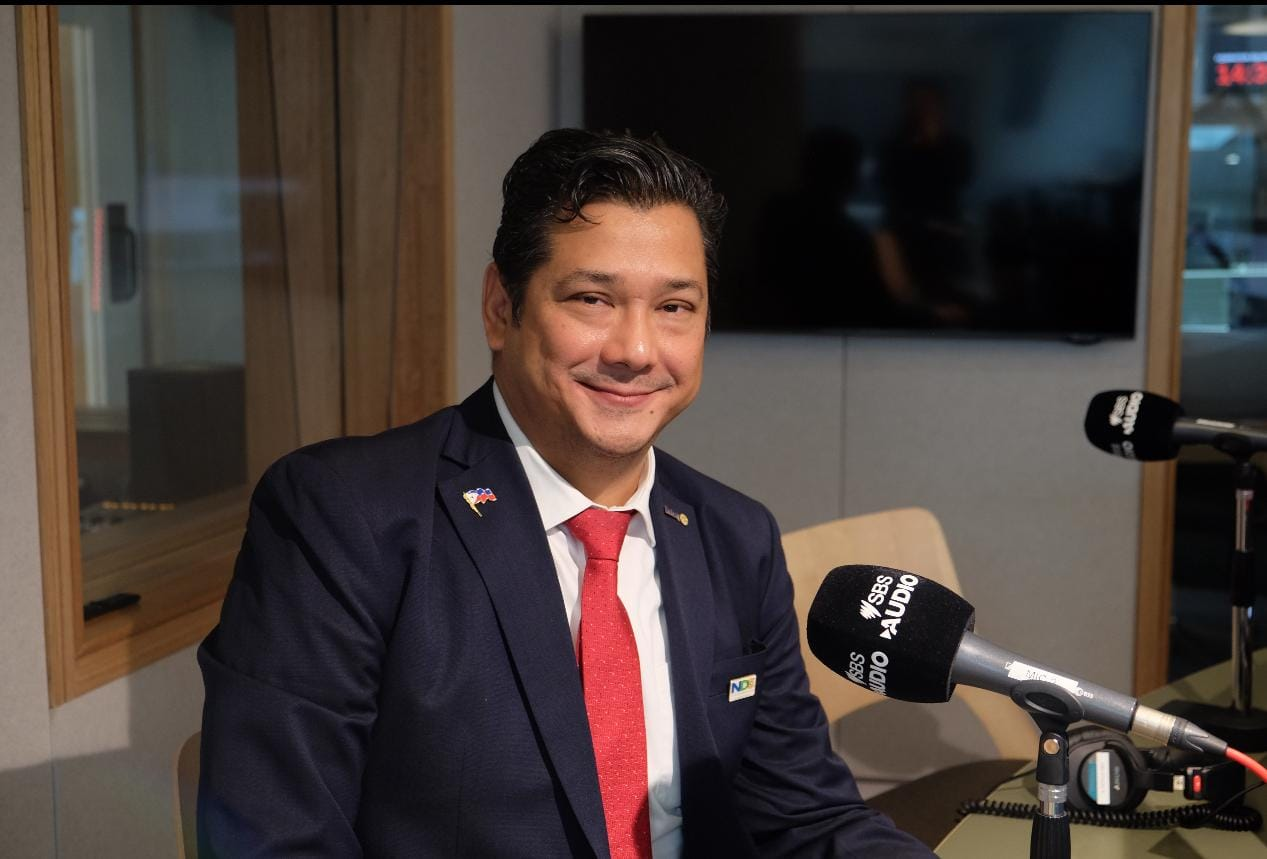
- Mauricio in 2023
- Born: Antonilo Dela Cruz Mauricio; January 17, 1972 (age 54); Davao City, Philippines
- Education: University of the Philippines Diliman
- Office: General manager of the National Development Company

Antonilo Dela Cruz Mauricio (born January 17, 1972) is a Filipino businessman who served as the general manager of the National Development Company of the Philippines.

== Early life and education ==
Mauricio was born in Davao City but moved to Quezon City, where he finished high school at Ateneo de Manila in 1988. He then graduated with a Bachelor of Science degree in Business Administration from the University of the Philippines Diliman in 1992. Mauricio is also a member of the Upsilon Sigma Phi fraternity. He later completed the Executive Program in Digital Leadership at Singapore Management University in 2022.

== Career ==
Mauricio was a senior manager at Urban Bank, where he oversaw deals, equities trading, and analysis from 1997 to 1999. He was then country manager of Thomson Ratings Philippines (TRP), advising on local debt ratings for the Asian Development Bank, the Securities and Exchange Commission, and the Philippine Stock Exchange from 1999 to 2000. TRP was acquired by Fitch Ratings. Mauricio transferred to the Mitchell Madison Group, becoming director for business development with regard to projects that included creating the Freeport Area of Bataan roadmap. He subsequently served as managing director of Interpacific United Strategies, Inc., counseling foreign nationals on their investment placements in the Philippines from 2000 to 2015. Mauricio was then country president of the Chartered Institute for Securities & Investment from 2015 to 2017. He shifted to Nu Agri Asia, operating as the consulting firm's chief financial officer and chief compliance officer from 2017 to 2019. Mauricio later worked at Netcore Development Ltd., offering business representation services for Asian clients from 2020 to 2022.

In 2022, Mauricio entered government service by being appointed general manager of the National Development Company (NDC), which is a GOCC attached to the Department of Trade and Industry. Leading the ISO-certified agency with the rank of undersecretary, he spearheaded the creation of the Philippine Innovation Hub that allows foreign investments from business centers such as Hong Kong and Singapore to funnel into Philippine startups. Mauricio ended his term at the NDC in November 2024.
