= Roberto Ongpin =

Filipino businessman and politician (1937–2023)

The Honorable Roberto Ongpin

Minister of Commerce and Industry
- In office July 23, 1979 – February 25, 1986 Serving with Luis Villafuerte (1979–1981)
- President: Ferdinand Marcos
- Preceded by: Vicente Paterno
- Succeeded by: Jose Concepcion Jr.

Mambabatas Pambansa (Assemblyman) from the Ministry of Commerce and Industry
- In office June 12, 1978 – June 30, 1984
- Preceded by: Position created
- Succeeded by: Position abolished

Personal details
- Born: Roberto Velayo Ongpin; January 6, 1937 Manila, Commonwealth of the Philippines
- Died: February 4, 2023 (aged 86) Polillo, Quezon, Philippines
- Education: Ateneo de Manila University (BS); Harvard University (MBA)
- Profession: Businessman
- Known for: Chairman, CEO, and Director of Alphaland Corporation

Roberto Velayo Ongpin (January 6, 1937 – February 4, 2023) was a Filipino businessman who served as the Minister of Commerce and Industry (initially as Minister of Industry) during the Marcos administration. His younger brother Jaime served as the Minister of Finance of the Philippines under Marcos's successor, President Corazon Aquino.

In the 2018 ranking by Forbes of the world's richest, Ongpin was named as the Philippines' twelfth wealthiest Filipino (up from sixteenth in 2017), with a net worth US$3.72 billion.

== Early life and education ==
Ongpin was born on January 6, 1937. He was the second of seven children by Luis Roa Domingo Ongpin and Lourdes Morales Velayo-Ongpin. He grew up in the neighborhood of Pinaglabanan in San Juan, which was then a suburb of the City of Manila and a part of Rizal province. He was a great-grandson of Román T. Ongpin, a businessman and philanthropist who aided Filipino revolutionaries against the Spanish and American colonial administrations in the Philippines. The Ongpins have been named as among the "most influential and enduring families of the Philippines" for their contributions to the nation's growth.

Ongpin attended school through a scholarship. After graduating high school from the Ateneo de Manila, he went on to earn a Bachelor of Science in Business Administration (cum laude) from the Ateneo de Manila University in 1957. He became a Certified Public Accountant (CPA) in 1958, after which he briefly joined Philippine Manufacturing Company (now Procter & Gamble Philippines).

In 1961, Ongpin earned his Masters of Business Administration from Harvard University. It was during his time in Harvard that he met and married his wife of 55 years, Monica Arellano of Valparaiso, Chile. They have two children together, Stephen Arellano Ongpin and Anna Arellano Ongpin. He also has two other children from different mothers, Michelle Schroer Ongpin, and Julian Stone Ongpin. He has three grandchildren.

== Early career ==
=== Sycip, Gorres, Velayo & Company ===
After moving back to the Philippines in 1963, Roberto V. Ongpin was recruited by his maternal uncle, Alfredo Velayo to work for "the Philippines' largest multidisciplinary professional services firm," Sycip Gorres Velayo & Company (SGV). According to SGV founder Washington Sycip, Ongpin was "one of the most aggressive and effective managers" he has ever known. In 1966, two years after joining the firm, Ongpin – who was barely 30 years old at that time – was named a managing partner of SGV. He served the firm from 1964 to 1979.

=== Minister of Trade and Industry ===
In 1979, Ongpin became the Philippines' youngest Commerce and Industry minister at the age of 42 when he accepted the invitation of then Philippine President, Ferdinand E. Marcos, Sr., to join his cabinet.

During his seven years as minister, Ongpin grappled with the deteriorating economy as political instability made funding from international agencies and banks difficult for the government. On occasion, he personally had to negotiate financing for the Philippines with other world leaders, including the Sultan of Brunei Hassanal Bolkiah, Malaysian Prime Minister Mahathir Mohamad, Singaporean Prime Minister Lee Kuan Yew, and Iraqi President Saddam Hussein.

In 1984, with "the Philippines facing a debt and foreign exchange crisis, the black market exchange rate soared to Php 30 per US Dollar (versus the official rate of Php 14 per Dollar)", Ongpin was credited with stabilizing the Philippine peso by establishing the "Binondo Central Bank," a dual exchange rate system that allowed the government to narrow the rate gap by directly intervening in black market currency prices.

=== 1986 People Power Revolution ===
In the early hours of February 22, 1986, as Ongpin was preparing to go to Malacañang Palace for a meeting with President Marcos, U.S. Ambassador Stephen Bosworth, and Special Envoy Philip Habib, he noticed that his military escorts had been pulled out. Ongpin's subsequent calls to then-Defense Minister Juan Ponce Enrile inquiring about the whereabouts of his security detail inadvertently alerted Enrile that Marcos may have already been aware of his plans to stage a coup d'etat. This triggered Enrile's hasty break from the government, eventually leading to the People Power Revolution that installed Corazon C. Aquino as the new Philippine President.

== Later career ==
=== Business ventures ===
==== Belle Corporation and Atok-Big Wedge ====
After the fall of the Marcos government, Ongpin pursued his own business interests. Among his first ventures was Belle Corporation with Benito Tan Guat. As chief executive officer of Belle Corporation, Ongpin was involved in the creation of its flagship development, Tagaytay Highlands. Ongpin was also the chairman of the investment holding company Atok-Big Wedge, Inc, involved in general investment, as well as mining, real estate, manufacturing, processing, lending and borrowing money.

==== Alphaland ====
Ongpin owned 94% of the shares of Alphaland, and was chairman of Alphaland Balesin Island Club, Inc., and the City Club at Alphaland Makati Place, Inc.; the developers of the Balesin Island Club, a resort located southwest of Polillo, Quezon Province, and the City Club, an Php 8 billion multi-use commercial residential complex with three high-rise buildings, a shopping mall, and a "3-hectare leisure, entertainment and business club." The company also owns and operates Alphaland Aviation, Inc., which as of 2016, provided charter services to Balesin Island Club located in Lamon Bay, Quezon province. In September 2017, Ongpin launched Alphaland Baguio Mountain Lodges, a 300-home development in Baguio. The project was developed at a cost of P5 billion, and opened in 2018.

==== PhilWeb ====
In 1979, Ongpin acquired control of South Seas Oil and Mineral Exploration Co. Inc., a mining and exploration company incorporated on August 20, 1969. The company became PhilWeb.Com, Inc. in 2000 and transformed itself into an internet company, upon the stockholders' approval of a restructuring plan which involved changes in the company's name and primary purpose, among others. The stockholders would further change the company's name to PhilWeb Corporation in 2002, a move that was approved by the Securities and Exchange Commission (SEC) later that year.

In August 2016, Ongpin resigned his post as chairman of PhilWeb Corporation, after being tagged by President Rodrigo Duterte as being part of the oligarchy, which was followed by a subsequent order to halt the online gambling industry, which was the core business of Philweb. Ongpin later clarified that Philweb is "not an online gaming company," but was merely the "software providers of e-Games, which is actually owned by the Philippine Amusement and Gaming Corporation (PAGCOR)." The unexpected singling out of Ongpin by President Duterte puzzled many observers, with some speculating that he might have just been a victim of the Philippines' "murky" politics. Ongpin, however, stressed that he "bears no rancor" towards Duterte, even stating that "he is my President, and I will do all I can to support him and his policies." Ongpin's decision to sell his shares in PhilWeb to former president Marcos' son-in-law, Gregorio Araneta III, lessened the political pressure on himself and the company, and allowed him to focus on his other business interests.

=== Other local and international business affiliations ===
Ongpin became a Board of Trustee member of the Philippine Institute of Pure and Applied Chemistry (PIPAC) when it was established in 1973 by faculty members of Ateneo de Manila University's Department of Chemistry, which was led by Dr. Modesto T. Chua. PIPAC was established to provide professional services including chemical testing, consultancy, technical training, and research and development services. He also played a role in the construction of PIPAC's own building in 1984.

Ongpin was also the chairman of the Philippine Bank of Communications, Inc. (PBCOM) until 2012, Eastern Telecommunications Philippines, Inc., (2006–2011), La Flor dela Isabela (1996), Sinophil Corporation, RVO Capital Ventures Corporation, Tabacalera Incorporada, Connectivity Unlimited Resource Enterprise, Inc. (2006), and Philippine Global Communications, Inc. (PHILCOM; through Belle Corporation). He also served as the vice chairman of Philex Mining Corporation.

Ongpin was also a director in the following corporations:

- Sinophil Corporation (1990s);
- Araneta Properties, Inc., (until 2009);
- Ginebra San Miguel Corporation (2010–2013);
- Petron Corporation (2008–2014);
- San Miguel Corporation (2009–2014);
- PAL Holdings, Inc. and Philippine Airlines, Inc. (2012–2014); and
- Makati Shangri-La Hotel & Resort, Inc. (2003–2014).

Ongpin was also affiliated with various foreign companies, including Acentic GmbH (until 2017), Developing Countries Investment Corporation, and Dragon Oil plc. He was also a deputy chairman of the South China Morning Post, a vice-chairman of AIA Capital Corporation (Hong Kong), and a non-executive director at E2-Capital Holdings Ltd (now known as CIAM Group Ltd), Forum Energy Plc UK, and Shangri-La Asia Ltd.

== Death ==
Ongpin died in his sleep on Balesin Island, Polillo, Quezon, on February 4, 2023, at age 86.

Political offices
Preceded by Vicente Paterno	Minister of Trade and Industry; 1979–1986	Succeeded by Jose Concepcion Jr. as Secretary for Trade and Industry
House of Representatives of the Philippines
New constituency	Mambabatas Pambansa from the Ministry for Trade and Industry; 1978–1984	Office abolished
