= Vicente Paterno =

Filipino businessman and politician

The Honorable Vicente Paterno
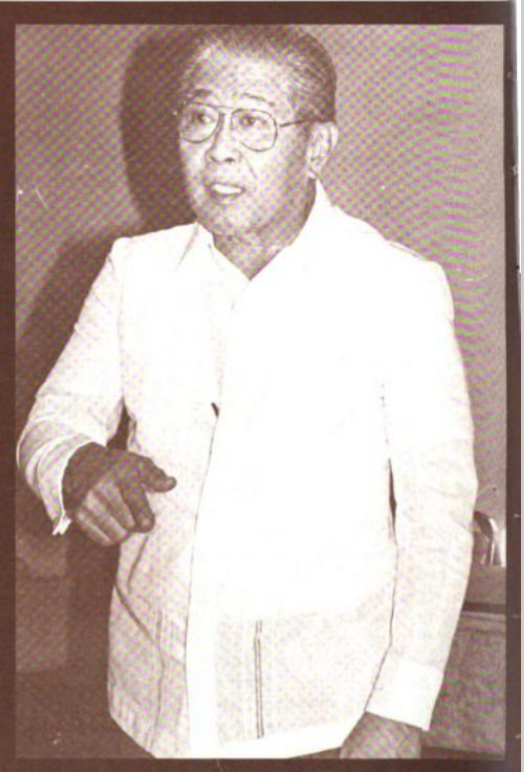
- Paterno as a senator, photograph released by the Philippine Congress, c. 1988

Senator of the Philippines
- In office June 30, 1987 – June 30, 1992

Deputy Secretary of Energy
- In office April 1986 – February 1987
- President: Corazon Aquino

Chairman of the Philippine National Oil Company
- In office March 1986 – February 1987
- President: Corazon Aquino

Minister of Public Highways
- In office 1979–1980
- President: Ferdinand Marcos
- Preceded by: Baltazar Aquino
- Succeeded by: Jesus Hipolito

Secretary/Minister of Industry
- In office 1974–1979
- President: Ferdinand Marcos
- Preceded by: Troadio Quiazon
- Succeeded by: Roberto Ongpin

Member of the Interim Batasang Pambansa
- In office June 12, 1978 – June 5, 1984
- Constituency: Region IV

Personal details
- Born: Vicente Tirona Paterno; November 18, 1925 Quiapo, Manila, Philippine Islands
- Died: November 21, 2014 (aged 89) Makati, Philippines
- Party: PDP–Laban (1987–2014)
- Other political affiliations: UNIDO (1986–1987); Kilusang Bagong Lipunan (before 1986)
- Spouse: Socorro Paz Trinidad Pardo (m. 1957)
- Children: 5
- Education: University of the Philippines Diliman (BS); Harvard University (MBA)
- Occupation: Businessman, politician

Vicente Tirona Paterno (November 18, 1925 – November 21, 2014) was a Filipino businessman and politician. He served as Minister of Industry from 1974 to 1979 and of Minister of Public Highways from 1979 to 1980, during the Ferdinand Marcos' government. He also served as a member of the Interim Batasang Pambansa from 1978 to 1984 and later as Senator from 1987 to 1992.

== Early life ==
Vicente Tirona Paterno was born in Quiapo, Manila on November 18, 1925, to Jose P. Paterno and Jacoba Encarnacion Tirona.

== Education ==
He was a graduate of De La Salle high school class 41 and later on earned his Bachelor of Science in Mechanical Engineering at the University of the Philippines Diliman in 1948 where he joined Tau Alpha and obtained Master of Business Administration at Harvard University in 1953.

Paterno was a lecturer in graduate school of the University of the Philippines, De La Salle University and Ateneo de Manila University from 1954 to 1962.

== Political career ==
He was elected as a representative to the Batasang Pambansa. Following his resignation from President Ferdinand Marcos's Kilusang Bagong Lipunan. He criticized the administration's assassination of opposition Sen. Benigno Aquino Jr. With Marcos, Paterno said technocrats had free reins to handle the economy except in cement prices, as he felt Marcos knew little in economics but had an edifice complex.

He became chairman of the National Citizens' Movement for Free Elections (Namfrel) during the 1986 presidential elections.

Afterwards, Paterno was appointed Deputy Secretary of Energy from April 1986 to February 1987, and Chairman of the Philippine National Oil Company from March 1986 to February 1987.

President Corazon Aquino convinced him to run for senator. He served one term from 1987 to 1992. In October 1982, he founded Philippine Seven Corp. He is known for becoming the first general manager of Phinma and the first Filipino treasurer of Meralco.

== Business career ==
Paterno started Philippine Seven Corporation in 1982. Popularly known as 7-Eleven, the convenience store has over 1,200 branches in the country.

He served as independent director for different companies such as City Resources Phil Corp., Benpres Holdings Corp., Metro Pacific Tollways Corp., Cityland Development Corp. and of First Philippine Holdings. He eventually resigned as his health failed.

Paterno won several awards – the Order of the Sacred Treasure from the Emperor of Japan, the 1982 MAP Management Man of the Year, and the 2013 Ramon V. del Rosario Award.

== Personal life ==
He is survived by his wife Baby, his children Judy, Mailin, Maite, Victor and Tina, and his eight grandchildren.

== Death ==
Paterno died at 8:40 in the morning of November 21, 2014. He was 89 years old.
