= Rizalino Navarro =

Filipino businessman and politician

18th Secretary of Trade and Industry
- In office July 1, 1992 – June 30, 1996
- President: Fidel Ramos
- Preceded by: Lilia R. Bautista
- Succeeded by: Cesar B. Bautista

Personal details
- Born: December 30, 1938
- Died: July 7, 2011 (aged 72) Makati, Philippines
- Education: University of the East (BS); Harvard Business School (MBA)
- Occupation: Entrepreneur

Rizalino S. Navarro (December 30, 1938 – July 7, 2011) was a Filipino businessman, business executive and politician. Navarro served as the Secretary of Trade and Industry from 1992 to 1996 within the Cabinet of former Philippines President Fidel Ramos.

Navarro earned a bachelor's degree in business administration cum laude from University of the East. He earned a Master of Business Administration from Harvard Business School.

Navarro also served as the chief executive officer of both SGV & Co., the largest accounting firm in the Philippines, and Rizal Commercial Banking Corporation (RCBC). Navarro launched his career at SGV in 1982 and rose to managing director of the firm by 1992, when he left to become Secretary of Trade.

He became Secretary of Trade through the invitation of then Finance Secretary Ramon del Rosario, who was one of Navarro's classmates at Harvard University.

Rizalino Navarro died of an apparent heart attack at the RCBC corporate gym in Makati on July 7, 2011, at the age of 72.
