= Gregory Domingo =

Filipino business executive

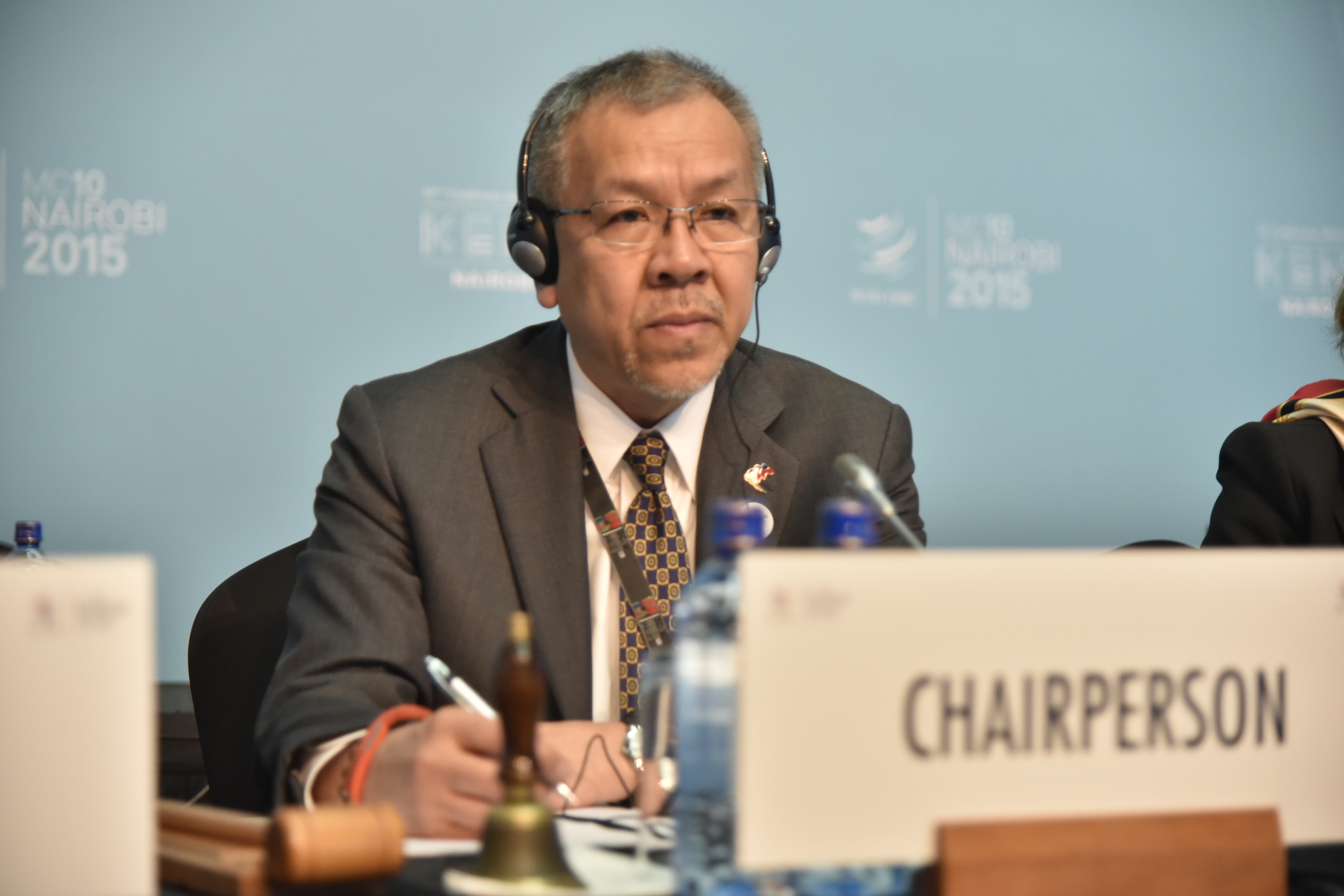

Secretary of the Philippine Department of Trade and Industry
- In office July 1, 2010 – December 31, 2015
- President: Benigno Aquino III
- Preceded by: Jesli Lapus
- Succeeded by: Adrian S. Cristobal Jr

Personal details
- Born: Metro Manila, Phillipnes
- Spouse: Rowena Domingo
- Relations: Lucy Domingo (granddaughter)
- Children: Sophia, Miguel, Roberto, Christina Domingo
- Education: Ateneo de Manila University (BS); Asian Institute of Management (MBA); Wharton School of the University of Pennsylvania (MS)

Gregory L. Domingo is a Filipino business executive who served as Secretary of Trade and Industry under the administration of President Benigno Aquino III.

== Background ==
Before being appointed to the Trade and Industry secretary post, he was the executive director of SM Investments Corporation.

== DTI Secretary ==
President Benigno Aquino III expects Domingo to generate more jobs for the Filipino people under his administration. He is expected to be a one-year appointee only since defeated vice presidential candidate Mar Roxas will take over his post.

Political offices
Preceded by Jesli A. Lapus	Philippine Secretary of Trade and Industry; 2010 – 2015	Succeeded by Adrian Cristobal, Jr.
