= Ramon Lopez (businessman) =

Philippine business man and incumbent cabinet

Ramon M. Lopez
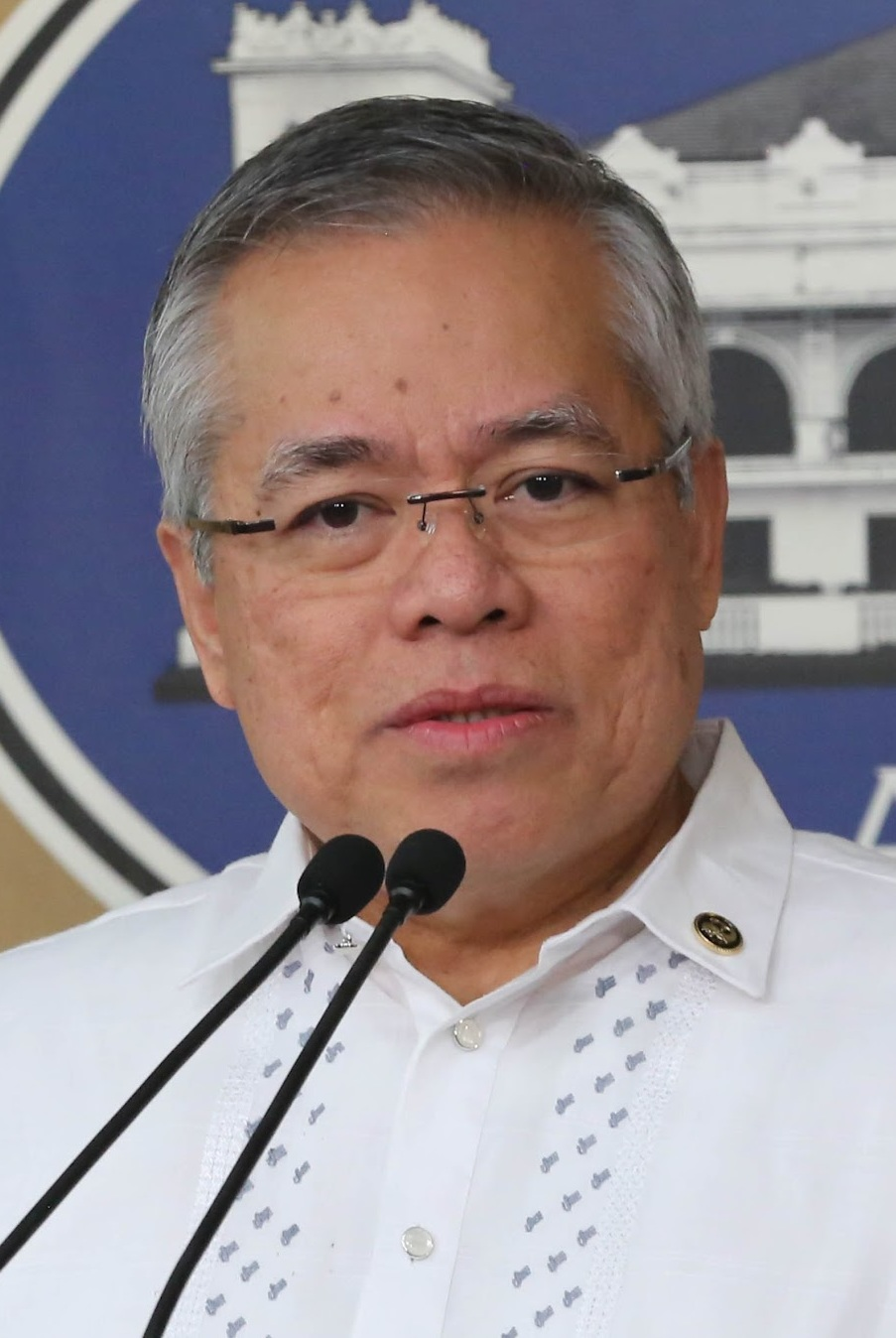
- Lopez in 2016

Secretary of Trade and Industry
- In office June 30, 2016 – June 30, 2022
- President: Rodrigo Duterte
- Preceded by: Adrian Cristobal Jr.
- Succeeded by: Alfredo E. Pascual (ad interim)

Personal details
- Born: Ramon Mangahas Lopez
- Education: University of the Philippines Diliman; Williams College

Ramon Mangahas Lopez is a Filipino businessman who served as the Secretary of Trade and Industry under the Duterte administration from 2016 to 2022. After his term as Department of Trade and Industry Secretary, he was elected as Independent Director of SM Investments Corporation (SMIC) on August 3, 2022.

Prior to his appointment as DTI secretary, he was the Vice President and Executive Assistant to the president and CEO of RFM Corporation, having served for the company for 22 years, and Executive Director of Go Negosyo of the Philippine Center for Entrepreneurship.

During his stint as DTI secretary, Lopez urged small and medium enterprises to shift to digital technology in order to become more competitive. He built partnerships with the private sector, such as with Filipino financial technology companies Investree and First Circle, to mitigate the effects of COVID-19 on the income of local businesses.

Lopez topped his Master in Development Economics at Williams College in Massachusetts (1988) and finished his AB Economics degree at the University of the Philippines Diliman in 1981.

He has contracted a SARS-CoV-2 infection for the third time.

Lopez is currently SM Investments's independent director and also Monde Nissin's independent director, replacing Mapletree Investments and Olam International directress Marie Elaine Teo.

Political offices
Preceded by Adrian Cristobal Jr.	Secretary of Trade and Industry; 2016–2022	Succeeded by Alfredo E. Pascual
