= Philippine Greens =

The Philippine Greens is a group of activists in the Philippines who formally organized themselves on November 30, 1996, with what they called the "Green worldview" as their basis of unity. The group consisted of political activists who acquired a stronger ecological perspective and environmental activists who acquired a stronger political perspective.

The basic founding document of the Philippine Greens is the Manifesto of the Philippine Greens, which summarizes their fundamental outlook.

In 1999, the Philippine Greens published their program of action under the title Society, Ecology and Transformation: a program for transforming Philippine society based on the Green worldview.

The group has been very active on mining issues, transport, ecological waste management, clean air and clean water advocacy, genetic engineering, sustainable agriculture and other issues. Among the more high-profile actions led by the Philippine Greens include demonstrations against mining, a picket against Bill Gates, whom they called a "cyberlord", and a 30-day hunger strike against genetically engineered Bt corn.

The Philippine Greens have focused on environmental issues and have not actively participated in Philippine elections. They based their decision on their analysis that Philippine electoral processes were so corrupt that participation in elections tended to corrupt the contestants themselves and the results often did not reflect the true will of the people.

In 2004, Philippine Greens secretary-general Roberto Verzol published an analysis which showed how widespread fraud in election tabulation could have altered the results of the presidential elections. Verzola also pointed out the errors of the National Movement for Free Elections's (NAMFREL) independent tally in the May 10, 2004 elections in his 12-page study.

Some of Philippine Green members subsequently initiated the formation of an independent election monitoring group, Halalang Marangal (Network of Citizens for Honest Elections and Truthful Statistics), to work for clean and honest elections.

Today, the Philippine Greens continue to focus on environmental issues and concerns. Their members are spread out within other environmental groups in the Philippines and they conduct regular fellowship meetings to share experiences, discuss the current situation, formulate a common stand, and make plans for intensifying and expanding their environmental advocacies.

In 2007, Reido Panaligan, coordinator of the Ecowaste Coalition of the Philippines, was selected by consensus to become the group's secretary-general.
