= Jose Concepcion Jr. =

Filipino government official and politician (1931–2024)

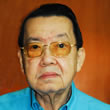

Secretary of Trade and Industry Minister of Trade and Industry (1986–1987)
- In office February 25, 1986 – January 8, 1991
- President: Corazon Aquino
- Preceded by: Roberto Ongpin (as Minister of Commerce and Industry)
- Succeeded by: Peter Garrucho

Personal details
- Born: December 29, 1931 Pasay, Rizal, Philippine Islands
- Died: March 6, 2024 (aged 92)
- Party: LDP
- Spouse: Maria Victoria Araneta (m. 1957)
- Children: 8
- Education: De La Salle University (AS); Araneta Institute of Agriculture (BS)
- Occupation: Businessman; industrialist; politician

Jose Santos Concepcion Jr. (December 29, 1931 – March 6, 2024), also known as Joecon, was a Filipino businessman, industrialist, activist, and politician.

He was primarily known as the President and COO of RFM Corporation from 1965 to 1986, where he was able to grow and expand it from a flour milling company to a highly diversified conglomerate. He was also the co-founder of the National Citizens' Movement for Free Elections (NAMFREL), a non-partisan election watchdog organization that became notable for monitoring the 1986 snap election, as well as exposing the multiple anomalies surrounding it.

After the People Power Revolution that erupted from the aftermath of the snap election, he served as the Secretary of Trade and Industry from 1986 to 1991, during the term of Corazon Aquino.

== Early life ==
Jose Santos Concepcion Jr. was born in Pasay on December 29, 1931, to industrialist Jose N. Concepcion Sr., who co-founded RFM Corporation and founded Concepcion Industries, and Herminia Santos. He was the eldest of four children which included a twin, Raul, who was born ten minutes after him and subsequently led part of the family business.

In his early years, Concepcion lived at the family residence in Taft Avenue, Manila, and studied at the nearby De La Salle University, from where he received an associate degree in commercial science, and the Araneta Institute of Agriculture, from where he received a Bachelor's Degree majoring in soils and agricultural sciences.

== Business ==
Concepcion served as president and COO of RFM Corporation, which was founded by his father Jose N. Concepcion Sr. and father-in-law Salvador Araneta as a flour-milling company, from 1965 to 1986. Under Concepcion's leadership, RFM diversified into the animal feed milling, poultry, and livestock industries and obtained a license from the American meat processing firm Swift to produce processed meats in the Philippines. Concepcion's family also owned the air-conditioning and refrigerator manufacturer Concepcion-Carrier, as well as the elevator and escalator manufacturer OTIS.

Concepcion was a trustee of the Makati Business Club from 1984 to 1986. He was also chairman of the Philippine Chamber of Commerce and Industry's ASEAN Committee, and was also the Philippine chair of the ASEAN Business Advisory Council and the East Asia Business Council upon their establishment in 2002.

== Scientific career ==
Concepcion was the first person in the Philippines to use radioisotopes, which he applied as a mechanism to determine how much phosphorus was needed in fertilizers to encourage growth. His efforts led him to publish a paper titled "Radio-isotope Phosphorus in Plants."

== Political involvement ==
Concepcion was elected to represent Rizal in the Philippine Constitutional Convention of 1971, during which he was an advocate for domestic manufacturers. Following the declaration of martial law in 1972, he was briefly imprisoned in the gymnasium of Philippine Constabulary headquarters in Camp Crame, Quezon City, during which he was noted for organizing his cell block to do daily tasks.

=== NAMFREL ===
In 1983, Concepcion revived the National Citizens' Movement for Free Elections (NAMFREL) as its chair. He helped mobilize thousands of members through his slogan "it is better to light a candle than to curse the darkness" and organized its meetings at his residence in Forbes Park, Makati. This also led him to resign from the Ninoy Aquino Foundation after Marcos supporters raised doubts over the watchdog's credibility. NAMFREL, particularly its volunteer wing known as the Bantay ng Bayan, became known for monitoring instances of fraud and other irregularities and publishing results of the 1984 Philippine parliamentary election that contradicted the official results released by the Commission on Elections (COMELEC).

Despite numerous threats and violence, it also monitored the 1986 snap elections on February 7 and published results that showed Corazon Aquino leading against incumbent president Ferdinand Marcos, in contrast again to the official results released by COMELEC. This triggered widespread protests that culminated with the People Power Revolution that toppled the Marcos regime later that month. Concepcion joined the uprising, where he was feted and lifted to the air by demonstrators chanting "NAMFREL".

=== Trade secretary ===
Following Aquino's inauguration as president, Jose was appointed as Secretary of the Department of Trade and Industry (DTI) from 1986 to 1991. His tenure in the Aquino cabinet was marked by his launching of the "Yes, the Filipino Can!" movement to promote the Philippines' economic recovery after the Marcos dictatorship and his establishment of the One-Stop-Shop program for obtaining business permits and licenses.

A message promoting the Yes, the Filipino Can! movement was included at the end of the 1991 comedy film Juan Tamad at Mister Shooli: Mongolian Barbecue. A year later in 1992, he ran for the position of senator, however achieved 29th place outside the winning circle of 24 candidates for that years elections.

== Later years ==
After leaving the Aquino cabinet, Concepcion returned to leading RFM, during which he also owned the Pop Cola Panthers competing in the Philippine Basketball Association from 1991 until the sale of its franchise in 2001. He was also elected in 1999 as barangay chairman of Forbes Park. During his tenure Concepcion, on one occasion, helped to direct traffic during a gridlock despite his advanced age. He also remained active in the politics of Pasay through the Pasay Citizens League for Good Government, which he founded. He also co-founded several other civil society and business organizations such as the Capitol Jaycees, the Bishop-Businessmen Conference for Human Development, and the ASEAN Chambers of Commerce and Industry. He also engaged in overseas visits to promote NAMFREL's work as the organization continued to help other countries hold credible elections.

In 2000, he was among several prominent members of the private sector who called for the resignation of President Joseph Estrada amid corruption scandals involving the latter.

== Personal life and death ==
Concepcion was married to Maria Victoria Araneta, whom he first met while studying at the Araneta Institute of Agriculture, and had eight children and 31 grandchildren.

One of his children, Jose Maria "Joey" Concepcion III, succeeded him as the head of RFM when he joined the Aquino cabinet, and served as Presidential Advisor for Entrepreneurship to Gloria Macapagal-Arroyo and Rodrigo Duterte, as well as a trade adviser to President Bongbong Marcos. Joey is also the founder of Go Negosyo, an organization that seeks to assist small and medium-scale entrepreneurs throughout the Philippines.

Concepcion died on March 6, 2024, at the age of 92. He was buried in Taguig.
