= Adrian Cristobal Jr. =

Filipino lawyer (born 1963)

Secretary of Trade and Industry
- In office January 1, 2016 – June 30, 2016
- President: Benigno Aquino III
- Preceded by: Gregory Domingo
- Succeeded by: Ramon Lopez

Personal details
- Born: Adrian Thaddeus Alexander Soriano Cristobal Jr. February 8, 1963 (age 63)
- Parent: Adrian Cristobal Sr. (father)
- Education: University of California, Berkeley (BA); Ateneo de Manila University (JD)
- Occupation: Administrator, lawyer and teacher

Adrian Cristobal Jr. (born February 8, 1963) is a Filipino lawyer, politician administrator. He served as the secretary of the Department of Trade and Industry from December 2015 to June 2016 under President Benigno Aquino III. He joined the Aquino administration in 2010.

== Early life ==
He earned a Doctor of Law at the Ateneo de Manila University and a Bachelor of Arts degree in political science from the University of California Berkeley.

== Career ==
Cristobal held the role of special assistant to the Secretary of the Department of the Interior and Local Government in 1994, and also served different government agencies as an adviser to the head.

Cristobal had a law practice, and taught in the Ateneo School of Government.

In 2001, he served as Undersecretary for Consumer Welfare and Trade Regulation. He held the position as Supervisor of Undersecretary for Legal Affairs before he was appointed Chief of Staff of the Secretary to the Department of Trade and Industry until 2005. He served as Director-General of the Intellectual Property Office of the Philippines from 2005 to 2009. From 2010 to 2012, he served as Undersecretary for International Trade.

In 2012. he became Undersecretary for Industry Development and Trade Policy, and held the position of deputy chairman and Head of Board of Investments.
