= Cornelio Balmaceda =

Former Secretary of Commerce and Industry

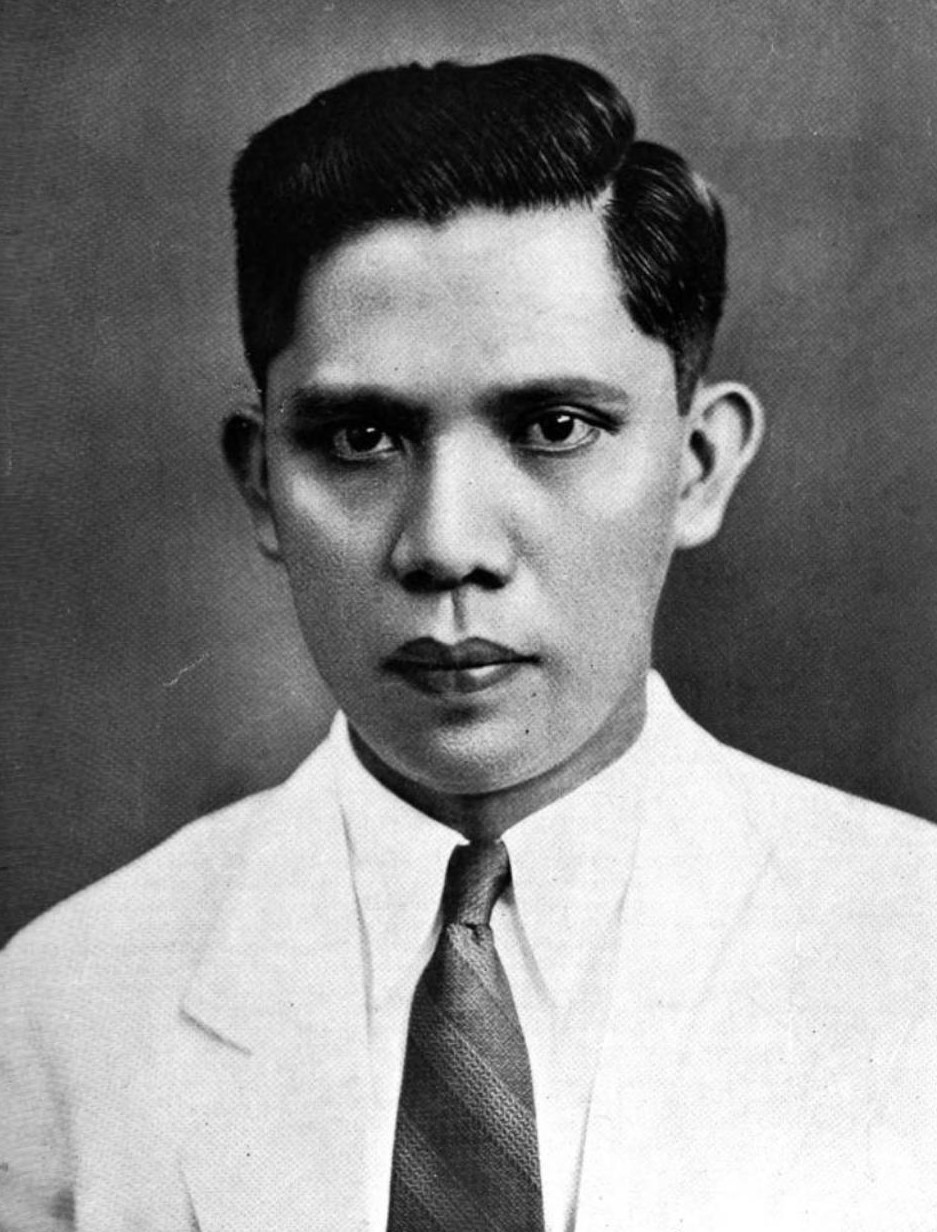
- Balmaceda in 1940

Secretary of Commerce and Industry
- In office 1963–1965
- President: Diosdado Macapagal
- Preceded by: Rufino Hechanova
- Succeeded by: Marcelo Balatbat
- In office 1947–1953
- President: Manuel Roxas; Elpidio Quirino
- Preceded by: Vicente Singson Encarnacion
- Succeeded by: Oscar Ledesma

Personal details
- Born: Cornelio Balmaceda y Agor; September 15, 1896 San Miguel, Ilocos Norte, Captaincy General of the Philippines, Spanish Empire
- Died: April 17, 1982 (aged 85)
- Spouse: Monica Jamias
- Children: 7
- Education: University of the Philippines (BA); Harvard University (MBA); University of Manila (LLB)
- Profession: Lawyer

Cornelio Agor Balmaceda (September 15, 1896 – April 17, 1982) was a former Secretary of Commerce and Industry in the Philippines. He was also one of the original board of trustees and then later became president of the Philippine Rural Reconstruction Movement.

Known for his notable achievements in Philippine government, particularly the creation of the Department of Commerce and Industry and his leadership in the establishment of the Asian Development Bank in the Philippines, Balmaceda was also a writer and a journalist.

== Early life and education ==
Balmaceda was born on September 15, 1896, in San Miguel (now Sarrat), Ilocos Norte. The son of farmers, Santos Balmaceda and Crispina Agor, he became the only child after his four siblings died in infancy. He attended elementary school in Sarrat and the first three years of high school in Laoag, Ilocos Norte. He left for Manila when he was sixteen to finish his last year of high school in the Manila High School. Having been taught by American teachers who were sent to the Philippines to teach English when the Americans took over the country, Balmaceda became fluent in English.

== Early career ==
For his first job, he was hired as a cub reporter in the Manila Times, a daily newspaper in Manila run by American journalists. In a few weeks he was given a regular beat as news reporter until he rose to be an editorial writer. Balmaceda was among the first five Filipino newspapermen who wrote in English. He enrolled in the University of the Philippines where he finished a degree in Bachelor of Arts in 1918. He was granted a government scholarship to study in Harvard University where he obtained an MBA, major in Foreign Trade in 1922. He finished a law degree at the University of Manila in 1927 and passed the Philippine bar in December of the same year. He married Monica Jamias with whom he has seven children: Cornelio, Jr., Erlinda, Zenaida, Virginia, Gloria, Grace and Rose Marie.

== Government work ==
In the Bureau of Commerce, he rose from Chief of the Editorial Section, then Head of the Commercial Intelligence Division, became Assistant Director, and was finally appointed Director in 1937. He founded and became a prolific writer and editor of the Commerce and Industry Journal where he urged the promotion and patronage of Filipino products which he called "a movement that deserves the full and active support of every citizen, Economic Nationalism, ..." He pushed for the formation of cooperatives to give the farmers a better market for their products.

Under President Manuel Roxas, Balmaceda proposed the creation of the Department of Commerce and Industry and became its first Acting Secretary. Under President Elpidio Quirino, Balmaceda was appointed Secretary of Commerce and Industry and held this position for five consecutive years.

Proposed by Balmaceda and launched in 1953, the Philippines International Fair was the biggest tourism project ever held in the Philippines. The Fair, headed by Balmaceda, occupied a land area of 19.5 hectares (48 acres) bordering Manila Bay – stretching to Intramuros and Taft Avenue in Manila – and was a huge success.

On January 3, 1962, Balmaceda was appointed chairman of the National Economic Council (NEC; now the Department of Economy, Planning, and Development) by President Diosdado Macapagal. By November of the same year, President Macapagal made Balmaceda a member of a special committee chaired by Justice Secretary Juan Liwag that sought to determine current Philippine laws that are in need of amendments in order to accommodate the socio-economic program of Macapagal's administration.

== Asian Development Bank ==
Balmaceda, as the Philippine Representative to the 9-nation Consultative Committee that conceived and formulated the measures for the establishment of the Asian Development Bank, was elected Chairman of the Consultative Committee. He said at the opening meeting: "It is the considered view of my government that the establishment of a regional bank for Asia and the Far East is one of the most significant and important, if not the most significant and important undertaking that the Economic Commission for Asia and the Far East has ever launched during its eighteen years of existence. My government is giving its full support and is prepared to cooperate to the fullest extent in bringing about the successful establishment of the proposed Asian Development Bank."

=== "Why Manila" article ===
In his article, "Why Manila", Balmaceda explained how the location of the bank was determined: "The selection of the location of the headquarters of the Asian Development Bank will be based on the conditions obtaining in the proposed site that are most conducive to the smooth and successful operation of the Bank and the attainment of its objectives. ... The primary objective of the Bank is to help accelerate the economic development of the developing countries in Asia. To accomplish this, the Bank must not only know the hardships, problems and dreams of these countries, but must also look at these hardships, problems, and dreams through the eyes of these countries. The Bank must, therefore, be located in a developing country. ... Viewed and tested by the above criteria, Manila, Philippines, stands as the most ideal and the best location for the Bank, and I feel confident that the Ministerial Conference, after careful, objective, and impartial analysis and comparison of the actual conditions in the different cities being proposed, will reach the conclusion that the Philippines offers the best location for the Bank."

Balmaceda led the campaign among the Asian contending countries for Manila to get the site and won in the final ballot by just one vote over Japan. For his accomplishment, he was awarded the Presidential Award of Merit by President Diosdado Macapagal.

Hailed as "Manila’s Golden Moment of Economic Diplomacy", Amando Doronila, columnist, wrote: "The success of that diplomatic campaign was made possible by two factors: the leadership of Commerce Secretary Cornelio Balmaceda and a diplomatic service infrastructure composed of veteran and competent diplomats, led by Foreign Secretary Mauro Mendez. Balmaceda was a top grade Cabinet minister of the old school of civil servants. He rose up the ranks of the bureaucracy. He had an impeccable integrity and was respected. He was never self-promoting ..."

Balmaceda died at the age of 85, on April 17, 1982, barely four weeks after his wife's death.

== Legacy ==
Founded and established by his daughter, Grace Balmaceda, the Cornelio Balmaceda Foundation seeks to be an institution that will promote the ideals that Cornelio Balmaceda exemplified in his life. The CBF has become a family commitment to improve the quality of life in the rural communities through self-help and education, encourage cooperative enterprise, and to preserve family and Filipino cultural values.

The CBF Scholarship Program launched in 2002 provides educational assistance to underprivileged but deserving students. Qualified students from the Sarrat National High School are enrolled at the Mariano Marcos State University in Batac, Ilocos Norte.

Every year on the 15th of September, to commemorate the birthday of Cornelio Balmaceda, the Balmaceda family, composed of his children and grandchildren, go to Sarrat, Ilocos Norte, his hometown, and conduct medical and dental missions for the town folks, where volunteer doctors and dentists attend to their medical needs. Since this CBF Outreach Program started, more than a thousand people of Sarrat, mostly from the rural areas, have been given free medical check-ups and free medicines. The school teachers of Sarrat have also attended English workshops for faculty development and the school children have enjoyed feeding programs and received school material kits.

=== Senate Resolution ===
From the article of Ramon J. Farolan in the Daily Inquirer (May 21, 2012): "Some 45 years after Manila became home to the Asian Development Bank, the Senate adopted a resolution sponsored by Senator Franklin Drilon, recognizing the role of Cornelio Balmaceda, Secretary of Commerce and Industry, in the establishment of the ADB headquarters in the Philippines. In simple ceremonies held at the Senate session hall, Senate President Juan Ponce Enrile presented to the members of the Balmaceda family - Virginia B. Castro, Gloria B. Gozum, and Rosemarie B. Lazaro, accompanied by spouses Antonio Gozum and the Manuel Lazaro - Senate Resolution No. 85."
