= National Development Company =

Philippine government agency

- Pambansang Kompanya sa Pagpapaunlad
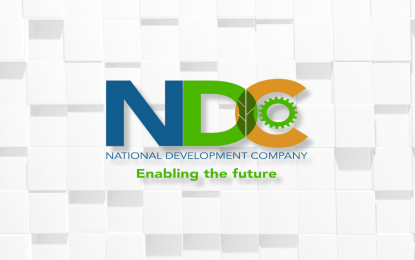
- Enabling the Future

Agency overview
- Formed: March 10, 1919; 107 years ago
- Preceding Agency: Compañía de Fomento Nacional
- Headquarters: 116 Tordesillas St., Salcedo Village, Makati, Metro Manila
- Agency executive: Saturnino H. Mejia, General Manager
- Parent department: Department of Trade and Industry
- Website: www.ndc.gov.ph

The National Development Company (NDC; Filipino: Pambansang Kompanya sa Pagpapaunlad) is a government-owned and controlled corporation attached to the Department of Trade and Industry of the Philippines.

== History ==
In 1919, during the American colonial period, the National Development Company (NDC) was originally established as the Compañía de Fomento Nacional by Legislative Act 2489. It was later designated as a state-owned company by Commonwealth Act 182 in 1936.

With the enactment of Presidential Decree No. 1648 in 1979, the NDC was reorganized under a new charter and mandated to pursue commercial, industrial, agricultural, or mining ventures that would stimulate economic development in the Philippines.

== See also ==
- Department of Trade and Industry (Philippines)
- Cooperative Development Authority
- Philippine Economic Zone Authority
