= Red Mobile =

Mobile virtual network operator in the Philippines

Connectivity Unlimited Resource Enterprise, Inc. (Red Mobile)
- Company type: Subsidiary
- Industry: Communications Services
- Founded: Manila, Philippines (2001)
- Defunct: July 2012
- Fate: Closed
- Successor: Smart Communications
- Headquarters: Makati, Philippines
- Key people: Manuel V. Pangilinan, Chairman; Eric O. Recto, President and CEO
- Products: Broadband Services; Cellular Telephony
- Parent: Smart Communications; Francom Holdings, Inc.
- Subsidiaries: Maier Group
- Website: www.redmobile.com

Red Mobile (also red mobile), formerly ümobile and legally as Connectivity Unlimited Resource Enterprise, Inc. (CURE), was a wholly owned subsidiary of Smart Communications, the Philippines' largest mobile telecommunications company. When it was initially launched as ümobile, it used the CURE Universal Mobile Telecommunications System network. At that time, it offered its services through an invitation-based, ad-supported platform, catering to middle and upper-class subscribers between the ages of 15 and 35, devoting its services to that demographic. After re-branding, both the ad-supported revenue platform and invitation system were scrapped in favor of a more traditional marketing and revenue-generating approach. In March 2010, Red Mobile started promoting its unlimited service offerings. However, subscribers started reporting on online social networks that the CURE UMTS network has since been converted to a GSM network. It closed in July 2012.

== History ==
The original CURE corporate logo

CURE was established in 2001 by two companies: PH Communications Holdings Corporation and Francom Holdings, companies both owned by businessman Roberto Ongpin, with Eric O. Recto as the president of the new company. The Congress granted the company a 25-year franchise to provide telecommunications services in the Philippines on April 24, 2001. However, significant operations did not commence until 2005, when CURE applied for one of the five 3G licenses being offered by the National Telecommunications Commission. It was one of four companies (the other three being Globe Telecom, Sun Cellular and CURE's current parent company, Smart Communications) to have been awarded a 3G license in 2006.

The awarding of a 3G license to CURE by the NTC is considered controversial and was the subject of a request by Juan Ponce Enrile for the Senate to conduct an inquiry in aid of legislation regarding the NTC's judgment in issuing the licenses. Enrile's request cites the incapability of CURE to independently mount a 3G network, as well as violations of its franchise when Smart acquired the company in 2008.

CURE's 3G network went live in December 2006, and the CURE network was opened for public trial through an invitation system. Persons who were selected to try out the CURE network were given a ₱500 phone credit allowance in addition to a free SIM card. At the time, CURE did not see itself as a competitor to the three established telecommunications companies, nor did it target its current demographic: the original demographic of the company was aimed more at corporate customers and individuals who wanted to avail of the new services and capabilities of UMTS. In part due to this original mission, CURE offered unlimited mobile phone browsing during its public trial.

The ümobile logo

On March 25, 2008, the Philippine Long Distance Telephone Company (PLDT), the parent company of Smart, announced that the latter had acquired CURE's parent companies in a ₱419.5 million (US$10 million) deal as part of Smart's planned expansion of both its 3G network and services. While the management structure was left untouched, the acquisition enabled Smart to align CURE towards becoming a niche provider in the then-young Philippine 3G market.

CURE rebranded itself as ümobile on May 19, 2008 during the network's public launch at the Rockwell Center in Makati. While ümobile is distinct from the previously independent CURE, it retained the old invitation system with a free SIM card and a six-month, P100 phone credit allowance.

ümobile invitations were available from June 1 to August 31 and invitations were distributed both at their website and at ümobile-sponsored events in bars and nightclubs around Metro Manila. However, the entire invitation system was shut down on September 1 as part of the integration of CURE's network assets with that of Smart's. This integration resulted in the retirement of the ümobile brand and the eventual transition to Red Mobile.

Red Mobile folded its services in July 2012, when PLDT turned its spectrum over to the NTC as one of the conditions the regulator set for the approval of the PLDT group's acquisition of Sun Cellular. Its spectrum, 3G frequency, and permits used by CURE were bidded out.

== Services ==
Red Mobile previously focused on providing highly affordable yet high-quality UMTS (3G) services. It challenged other carriers who provide "unlimited" services, by focusing on the negative quality of those "unlimited" services, such as poor signal, congested lines and bad connections. Red Mobile offered a 50-centavo/minute rate for same-network voice calls and video calls, plus a 50-centavo/160 characters rate for same-network messages. Red Mobile also sold the idea of a high-quality nationwide network by limiting their subscribers' access to just the UMTS network, thereby avoiding access to the more congested and lower quality EDGE network.

However, that strategy did not attract a lot of subscribers. While Smart was busy acquiring the wireless business of Piltel, Red Mobile users were allowed access to the GSM/EDGE network to further increase the market potential of Red Mobile (since 3G handsets were not yet that prevalent in the market).

In March 2010, Red Mobile started promoting its unlimited service offerings. It retained the 50-centavo rates. However, subscribers started reporting on online social networks that the CURE UMTS network has since been converted to a GSM network. This caused the loss of video calling capabilities and other 3G-related services.

== See also ==
- Smart Communications
