= Secretary of Trade and Industry (Philippines) =

Philippine government official

- Kalihim ng Kalakalan at Industriya
- Official logo of the Department of Trade and Industry

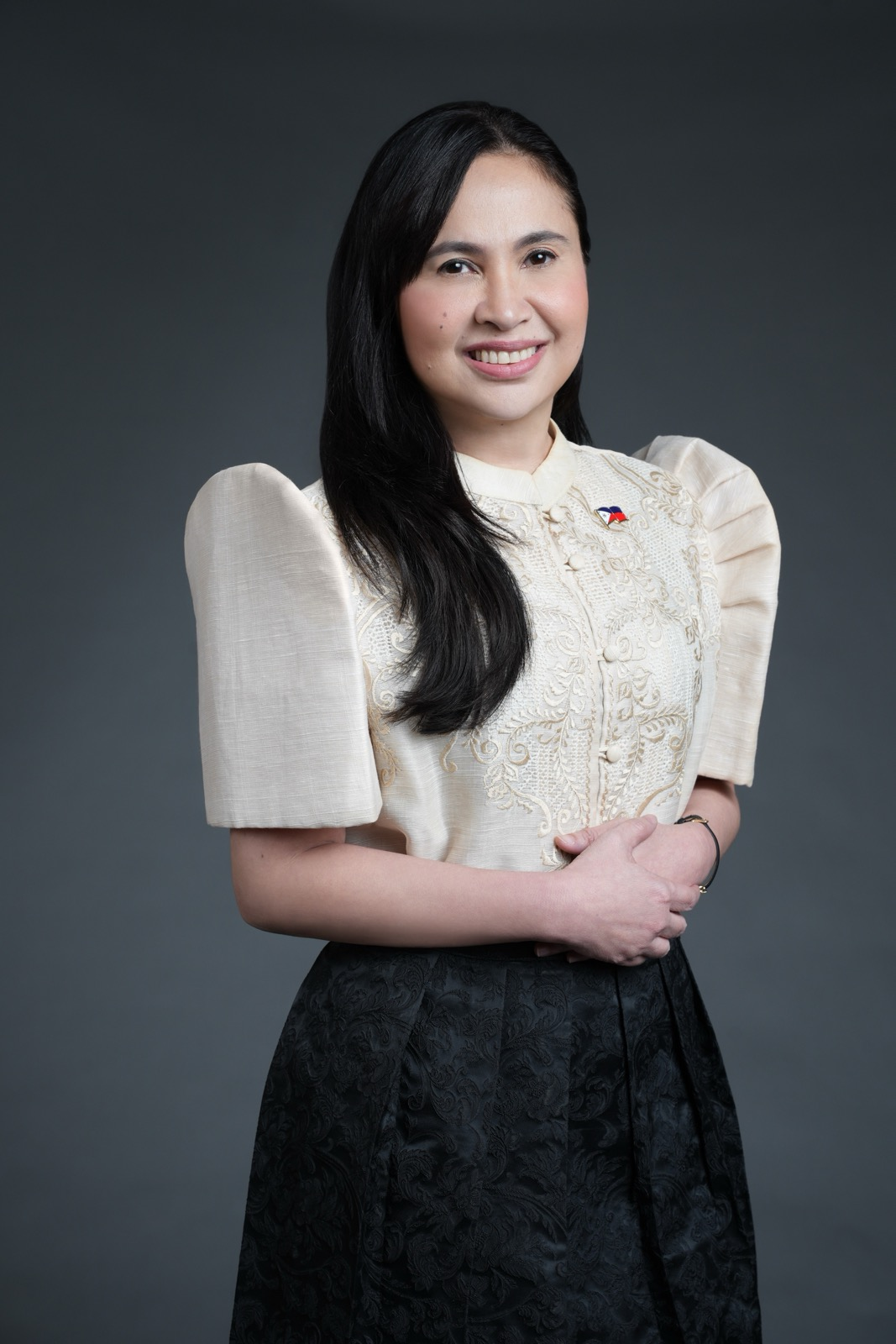
- Incumbent; Maria Cristina Aldeguer-Roque since August 2, 2024
- Style: The Honorable
- Member of: Cabinet
- Appointer: The president with the consent of the Commission on Appointments
- Term length: No fixed term
- Inaugural holder: León María Guerrero
- Formation: September 6, 1901 (125 years ago)
- Website: www.dti.gov.ph

The secretary of trade and industry (Filipino: Kalihim ng Kalakalan at Industriya) is the head of the Department of Trade and Industry and is a member of the president’s Cabinet.

== List of secretaries of trade and industry ==
=== Secretary of Agriculture, Industry and Commerce (1899) ===
Portrait	Name (Birth–Death)	Took office	Left office	President
	León María Guerrero (1853–1935)	May 7, 1899	November 13, 1899	Emilio Aguinaldo

=== Secretary of Commerce and Police (1901–1917) ===
Portrait	Name (Birth–Death)	Took office	Left office	Governor-General
	Luke Edward Wright (1846–1922)	September 1, 1901	January 31, 1904	William Howard Taft
	William Cameron Forbes (1870–1959)	June 16, 1904	November 10, 1909	Luke Edward Wright
	William Cameron Forbes (1870–1959)	June 16, 1904	November 10, 1909	Henry Clay Ide
	William Cameron Forbes (1870–1959)	June 16, 1904	November 10, 1909	James Francis Smith
	Charles B. Elliott (1861–1935)	February 10, 1910	December 6, 1912	William Cameron Forbes
	Clinton L. Riggs (1865–1938)	December 1, 1913	October 31, 1915	Francis Burton Harrison
	Eugene E. Reed (1866–1940)	May 24, 1916	August 29, 1916	Francis Burton Harrison

=== Secretary of Commerce and Communications (1917–1933) ===
Portrait	Name (Birth–Death)	Took office	Left office	Governor-General
	Dionisio Jakosalem (1878–1931)	January 18, 1917	October 31, 1922	Francis Burton Harrison
	Dionisio Jakosalem (1878–1931)	January 18, 1917	October 31, 1922	Charles Yeater
	Dionisio Jakosalem (1878–1931)	January 18, 1917	October 31, 1922	Leonard Wood
	Miguel Unson; Acting	October; 1922	February; 1923	Leonard Wood
	Salvador Laguda (1872–1931)	February 9, 1923	July 17, 1923	Leonard Wood
	Cipriano Unson; Acting	July; 1923	September; 1928	Leonard Wood
	Cipriano Unson; Acting	July; 1923	September; 1928	Eugene Allen Gilmore
	Cipriano Unson; Acting	July; 1923	September; 1928	Henry L. Stimson
	Filemon Perez (1883–1943)	September 7, 1928	January 1, 1933	Henry L. Stimson

=== Secretary of Agriculture and Commerce (1933–1935) ===
Portrait	Name (Birth–Death)	Took office	Left office	Governor-General
	Vicente Singson Encarnacion (1875–1961)	January 1, 1933	July 26, 1934	Theodore Roosevelt Jr.
	Vicente Singson Encarnacion (1875–1961)	January 1, 1933	July 26, 1934	Frank Murphy
	Eulogio Rodriguez (1883–1964)	July 26, 1934	November 15, 1935	Frank Murphy

=== Secretary of Agriculture, Industry and Commerce (1935–1941) ===
Portrait	Name (Birth–Death)	Took office	Left office	President
	Eulogio Rodriguez (1883–1964)	November 15, 1935	November 15, 1938	Manuel L. Quezon
	Benigno Aquino Sr. (1894–1947)	December 1, 1938	August 28, 1941	Manuel L. Quezon
	Rafael Alunan Sr. (1885–1947)	August 28, 1941	December 24, 1941	Manuel L. Quezon

=== Secretary of Finance, Agriculture and Commerce (1941–1944) ===
Portrait	Name (Birth–Death)	Took office	Left office	President
	José Abad Santos (1886–1942)	December 24, 1941	March 26, 1942	Manuel L. Quezon
	Andrés Soriano (1898–1964)	March 26, 1942	July 31, 1944	Manuel L. Quezon

=== Commissioner of Agriculture and Commerce (1942–1943) ===
Portrait	Name (Birth–Death)	Took office	Left office	Chairman of the Philippine Executive Commission
	Rafael Alunan Sr. (1885–1947)	January 26, 1942	October 14, 1943	Jorge B. Vargas

=== Minister of Agriculture and Commerce (1943–1945) ===
Portrait	Name (Birth–Death)	Took office	Left office	President
	Rafael Alunan Sr. (1885–1947)	October 19, 1943	March 20, 1945	Jose P. Laurel

=== Secretary of Agriculture and Commerce (1944–1947) ===
Portrait	Name (Birth–Death)	Took office	Left office	President
	Manuel Nieto (1892–1970)	August 8, 1944	February 27, 1945	Sergio Osmeña
	Delfín Jaranilla (1883–1980)	February 27, 1945	July 12, 1945	Sergio Osmeña
	Vicente Singson Encarnacion (1875–1961)	July 12, 1945	May 28, 1946	Sergio Osmeña
	Mariano Garchitorena (1898–1961)	May 28, 1946	July 1, 1947	Manuel Roxas

=== Secretary of Commerce and Industry (1947–1974) ===
Portrait	Name (Birth–Death)	Took office	Left office	President
	Cornelio Balmaceda (1896–1982)	1947	1953	Manuel Roxas
	Cornelio Balmaceda (1896–1982)	1947	1953	Elpidio Quirino
	Oscar Ledesma (1902–1995)	1953	1957	Ramon Magsaysay
	Pedro Hernaez (1899–1978)	1957	1960	Carlos P. Garcia
	Manuel Lim	1960	1962	Carlos P. Garcia
	Manuel Lim	1960	1962	Diosdado Macapagal
	Rufino Hechanova	1962	1963	Diosdado Macapagal
	Cornelio Balmaceda (1896–1982)	1963	1965	Diosdado Macapagal
	Marcelo Balatbat	1966	1968	Ferdinand Marcos
	Leonides Sarao Virata (1918–1976)	1969	1970	Ferdinand Marcos
	Ernesto Maceda (1935–2016)	1970	1971	Ferdinand Marcos
	Troadio Quiazon	1971	1972	Ferdinand Marcos

=== Secretary of Trade and Tourism (1972–1973) ===
Portrait	Name (Birth–Death)	Took office	Left office	President
	Troadio Quiazon	1972	1973	Ferdinand Marcos

=== Secretary of Trade (1973–1978) ===
Portrait	Name (Birth–Death)	Took office	Left office	President
	Troadio Quiazon	1973	1978	Ferdinand Marcos

=== Secretary of Industry (1974–1978) ===
Portrait	Name (Birth–Death)	Took office	Left office	President
	Vicente Paterno (1925–2014)	1974	1978	Ferdinand Marcos

=== Minister of Trade (1978–1981) ===
Portrait	Name (Birth–Death)	Took office	Left office	President
	Troadio Quiazon	1978	1979	Ferdinand Marcos
	Roberto Ongpin (1937–2023)	July 23, 1979	June 30, 1981	Ferdinand Marcos

=== Minister of Industry (1978–1981) ===
Portrait	Name (Birth–Death)	Took office	Left office	President
	Vicente Paterno (1925–2014)	1978	1979	Ferdinand Marcos
	Luis Villafuerte (1935–2021)	July 23, 1979	June 30, 1981	Ferdinand Marcos

=== Minister of Trade and Industry (1981–1987) ===
Portrait	Name (Birth–Death)	Took office	Left office	President
	Roberto Ongpin (1937–2023)	June 30, 1981	February 25, 1986	Ferdinand Marcos
	Jose Concepcion Jr. (1931–2024)	February 25, 1986	February 11, 1987	Corazon Aquino

=== Secretary of Trade and Industry (since 1987) ===
Portrait	Name (Birth–Death)	Took office	Left office	President
	Jose Concepcion Jr. (1931–2024)	February 11, 1987	January 8, 1991	Corazon Aquino
	Peter Garrucho	January 9, 1991	February 12, 1992	Corazon Aquino
	Lilia Bautista	February 19, 1992	June 30, 1992	Corazon Aquino
	Rizalino Navarro (1938–2011)	July 1, 1992	July 30, 1996	Fidel V. Ramos
	Cesar Bautista	August 1, 1996	June 30, 1998	Fidel V. Ramos
	Jose Pardo	June 30, 1998	January 2, 2000	Joseph Estrada
	Mar Roxas (born 1957)	January 2, 2000	December 10, 2003	Joseph Estrada
	Mar Roxas (born 1957)	January 2, 2000	December 10, 2003	Gloria Macapagal Arroyo
	Cesar Purisima (born 1960)	December 10, 2003	February 15, 2005	Gloria Macapagal Arroyo
	Juan Santos	February 15, 2005	July 8, 2005	Gloria Macapagal Arroyo
	Peter Favila	July 8, 2005	March 15, 2010	Gloria Macapagal Arroyo
	Jesli Lapus (born 1949)	March 15, 2010	June 30, 2010	Gloria Macapagal Arroyo
	Gregory Domingo	June 30, 2010	December 30, 2015	Benigno Aquino III
	Adrian Cristobal Jr. (born 1963)	December 31, 2015	June 30, 2016	Benigno Aquino III
	Ramon Lopez	June 30, 2016	June 30, 2022	Rodrigo Duterte
	Alfredo E. Pascual (born 1948)	June 30, 2022	August 2, 2024	Bongbong Marcos
	Cristina Aldeguer-Roque (Note: Cristina Aldeguer-Roque served in an acting capacity from August 2 until October 27, 2024.)	August 2, 2024	October 27, 2024	Bongbong Marcos
	Cristina Aldeguer-Roque	October 27, 2024	Incumbent	Bongbong Marcos
