= Cristina Aldeguer-Roque =

Filipino businesswoman and government official

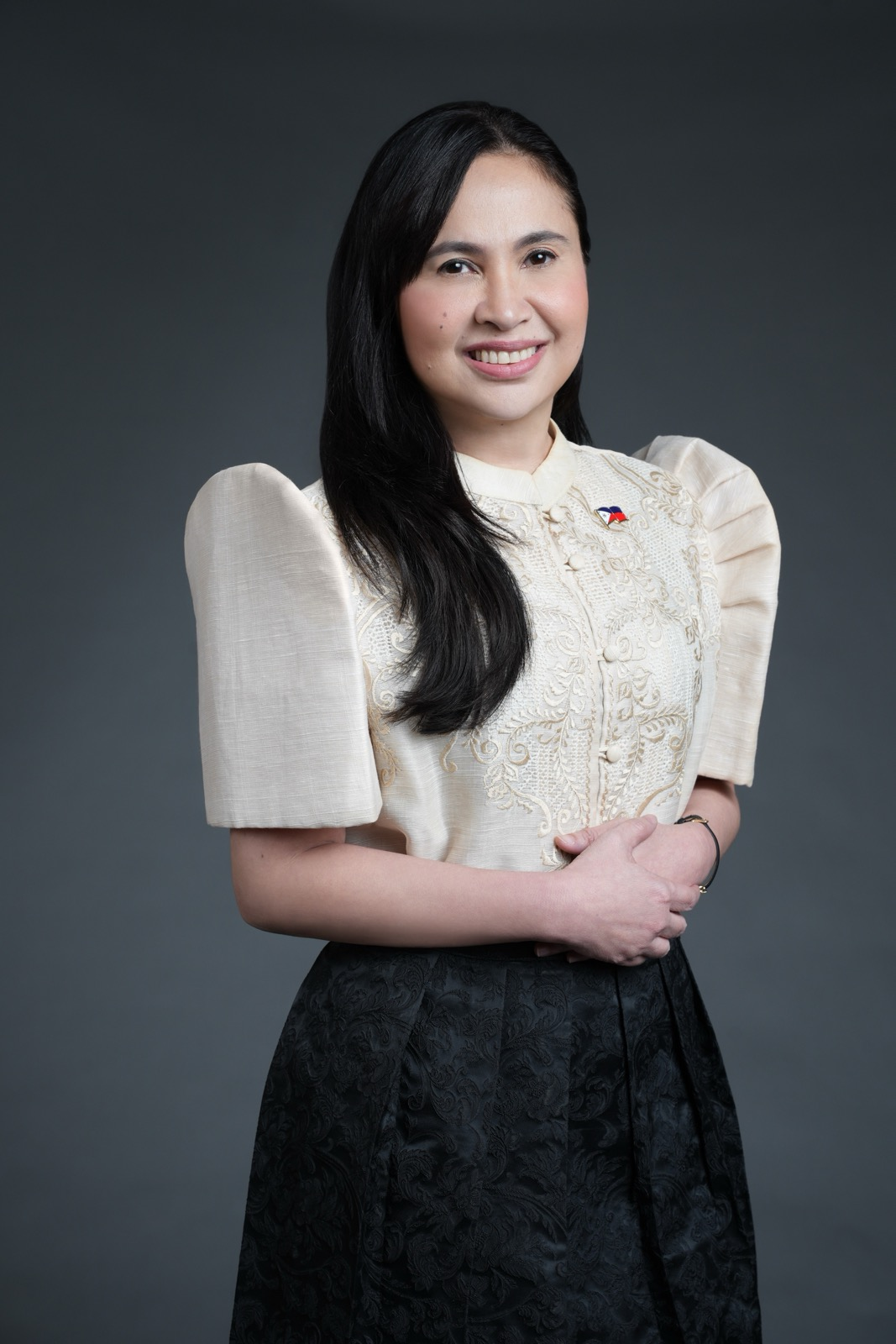
- Aldeguer-Roque in 2025

42nd Secretary of Trade and Industry
- Incumbent
- Assumed office August 3, 2024 (Note: Served as acting secretary of the DTI from August 3, 2024 until October 27, 2024.)
- President: Bongbong Marcos
- Preceded by: Alfredo E. Pascual

Undersecretary of Trade and Industry
- In office February 2024 – July 2024
- President: Bongbong Marcos

Personal details
- Born: Maria Cristina Aldeguer; 1967 or 1968 (age 57–58)
- Spouse: Gun Roque
- Relatives: Dino Aldeguer (brother); Andres Aldeguer (nephew); Binky Favis (brother-in-law)
- Education: De La Salle University (BS)
- Occupation: Business executive; Government official
- Profession: Businesswoman

Maria Cristina Aldeguer-Roque (born 1967 or 1968) is a Filipino business executive and government official serving as the 42nd Philippine secretary of trade and industry since 2024. Prior to her appointment as secretary by President Bongbong Marcos, she served as an undersecretary at the Department of Trade and Industry.

== Personal life and education ==
Maria Cristina Aldeguer is the older sister of former basketball player Dino Aldeguer and the sister-in-law of former basketball coach and Parañaque councilor Binky Favis. Her sister, Marivic, is married to architect John Pangilinan, brother of Senator Kiko Pangilinan.

Aldeguer completed her primary education at the Colegio de San Agustin in Makati and De La Salle Santiago Zobel School in Muntinlupa, where she also attended her secondary education. She pursued higher education at De La Salle University, earning a Bachelor of Science degree in Industrial Management Engineering with a minor in Chemical Engineering.

She is married to businessman Gun Roque.

== Career ==
=== Early professional career ===
Maria Cristina Aldeguer-Roque established herself as a prominent business leader as the CEO and president of the Kamiseta Group of Companies. Under her leadership, she launched and developed the clothing brand Kamiseta, which has been in operation for over 30 years. The brand is known for its high-quality, affordable, and stylish clothing, catering to a wide range of customers in the Philippines.

During her tenure at Kamiseta, Aldeguer-Roque focused on innovation, sustainability, and customer satisfaction, which helped the brand maintain its competitive edge in the fashion industry. Her success in the private sector laid the foundation for her transition into public service, where she continues to apply her business acumen to drive economic growth and development.

=== Department of Trade and Industry ===
==== Undersecretary (2024) ====
Aldeguer-Roque transitioned into government service, serving as an undersecretary at the Department of Trade and Industry (DTI). Her expertise in business and management positioned her as a key figure in the department's leadership, where she contributed to policies aimed at promoting trade, industry, and economic development.

==== Secretary of Trade and Industry (2024–present) ====
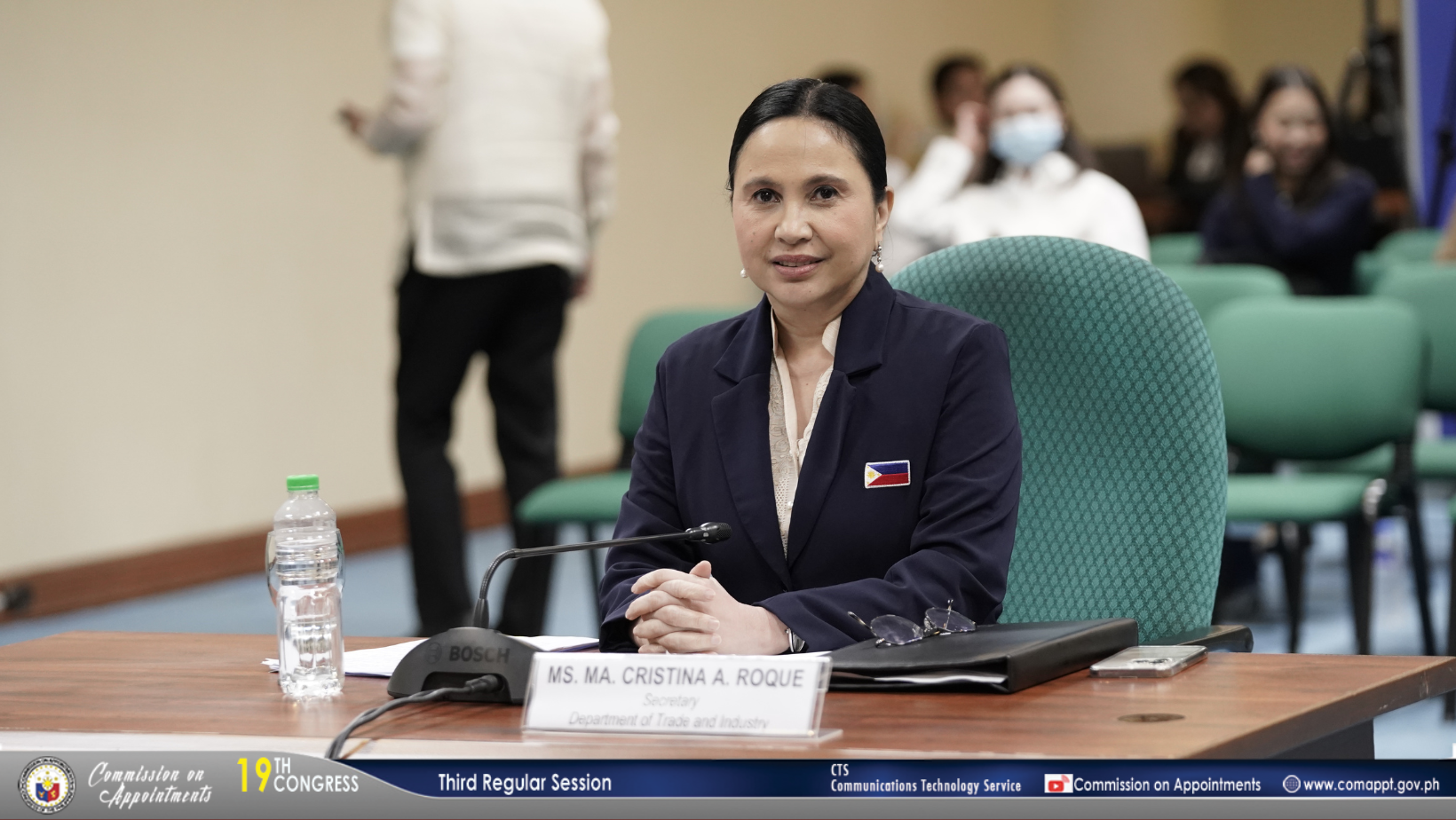
Aldeguer-Roque attending the Commission on Appointments's plenary session on November 27, 2024, of which her appointment as the Secretary of Trade and Industry was approved by the Commission on Appointments a day later (November 28, 2024).

On August 3, 2024, President Bongbong Marcos appointed her as acting secretary of trade and industry, succeeding Alfredo Pascual. In this role, she represented the Philippines at the APEC Economic Leaders' Meeting in Peru in November 2024. She stepped in after President Marcos decided not to attend due to a series of typhoons affecting the Philippines then.

On November 28, 2024, Roque's ad interim appointment was confirmed by the Commission on Appointments (CA) as the Secretary of Trade and Industry.

During her confirmation hearing, Roque was questioned by lawmakers regarding the DTI's initiatives to support small and medium enterprises (SMEs) and safeguard consumers from substandard products. She emphasized the department's use of artificial intelligence through a chatbot to address consumer and entrepreneur inquiries about quality products and business start-ups.

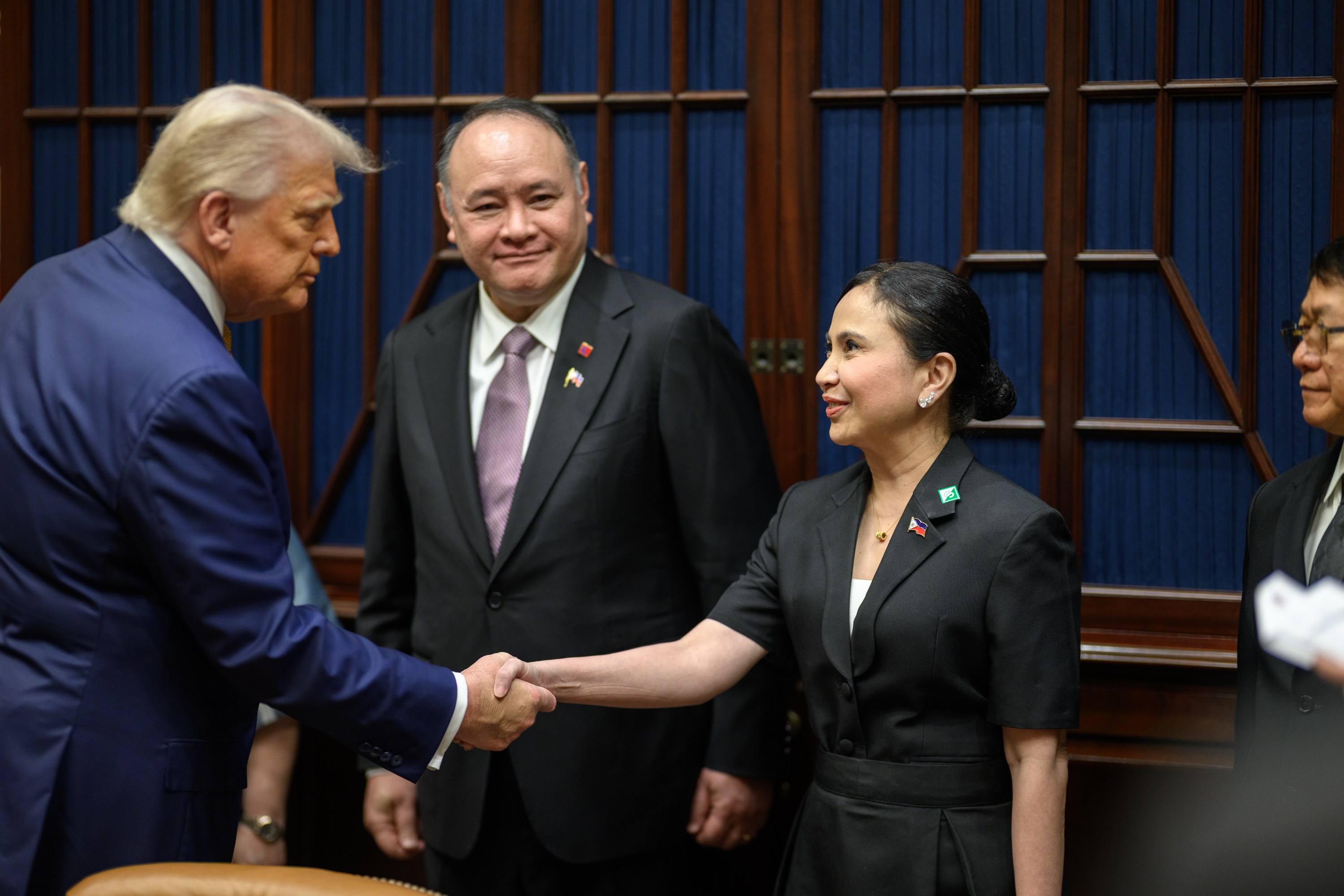
Aldeguer-Roque meeting U.S. President Donald Trump (left) at the Roosevelt Room in the White House in Washington, D.C., July 22, 2025.

Roque highlighted the importance of micro, small, and medium enterprises (MSMEs), stating, "The MSME is a sector we cannot ignore, being 99.5 percent of the business establishments and 60 percent of the labor force. Therefore, we need to ensure their development, as they are the game changers of our economy." She outlined the DTI's strategies to foster MSME growth, including promoting digitalization, diversification, franchising, and improved access to financing.

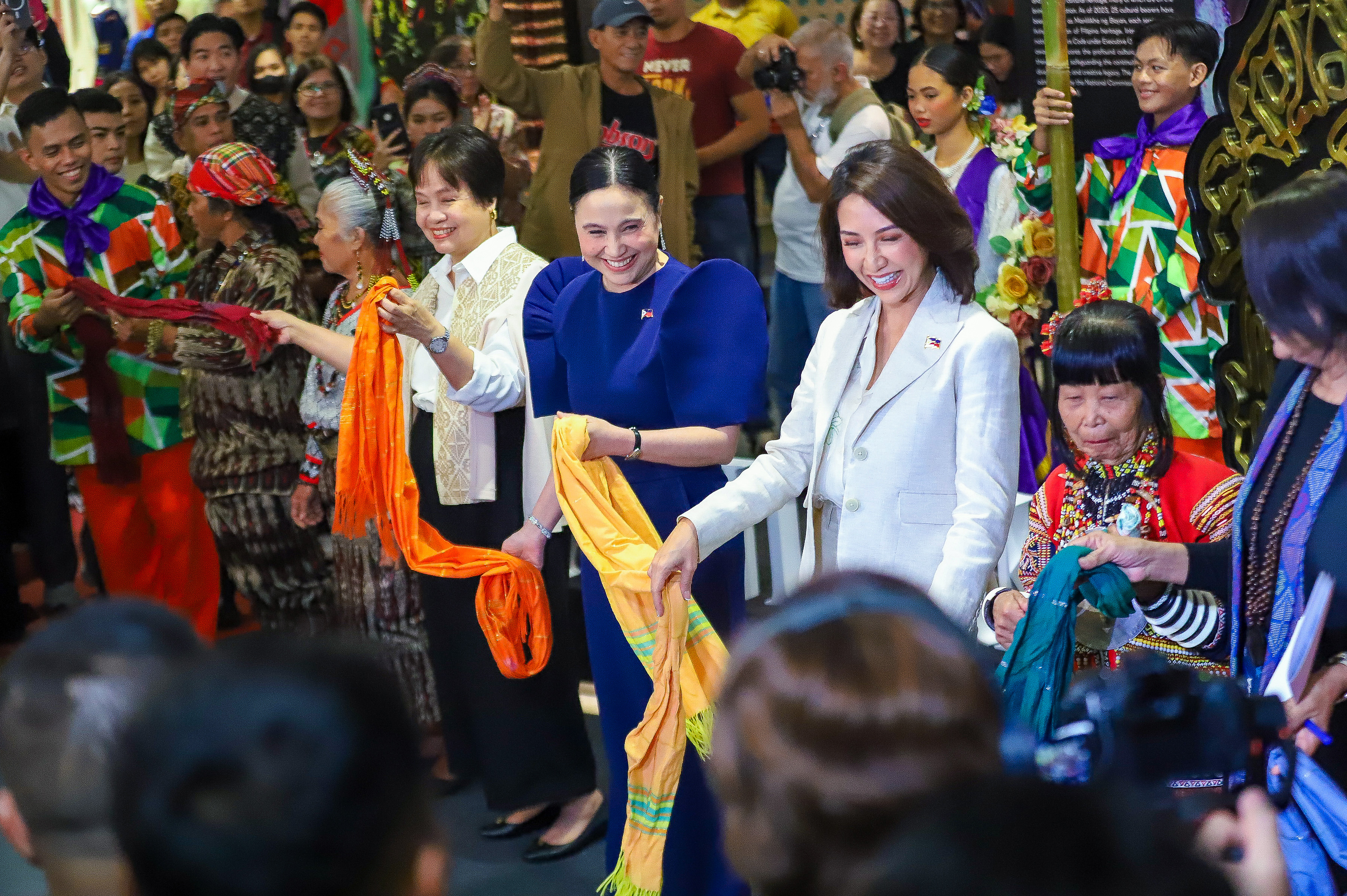
Aldeguer-Roque attending the National Arts and Crafts Fair with Tourism Secretary Christina Frasco at SM Megamall in Mandaluyong, October 24, 2024.

Roque also underscored DTI's focus on international trade and foreign investments to drive economic growth and job creation. “In the last three months since assuming the role, we have been active in promoting international trade and foreign investments. This is crucial for the growth of our economy and provides more jobs for our people. The more jobs we have for them, the more they can come home to be with their family,” she said. She added that her international engagements prioritize both attracting large-scale investments and opening global markets for MSMEs capable of competing internationally.

== Controversies ==
Aldeguer-Roque drew flak from Filipinos for a consumer information announcement in November 2025 that a family of four can now afford a decent Noche Buena (referring to the traditional Philippine Christmas Eve meal) for a mere ₱500 (US$10.15). This announcement was part of the DTI’s mandate of price monitoring and was meant to support President Bongbong Marcos’ claim that inflation is under control.

This announcement was criticized for being tone deaf and unrealistic by most mainstream and radio media becoming a meme in some posts. Despite this, she hammered down on this message on November 28, 2025. Inquirer.net wrote that this assertion is a “Fantastical Noche Buena” and suggested that instead of trying to prepare a meal to fit this narrative, she should go out of her office to bring the prices down as part of her job.

== Notes ==
Political offices
Preceded by Alfredo Pascual	Secretary of Trade and Industry; 2024–present Acting secretary from August 3 to October 27, 2024.	Incumbent
Order of precedence
Preceded by Edwin Mercado as Secretary of Health	Order of Precedence of the Philippines as Secretary of Trade and Industry	Succeeded by Hans Leo Cacdac as Secretary of Migrant Workers
