= Pedro Hernaez =

Filipino lawyer, politician, diplomat

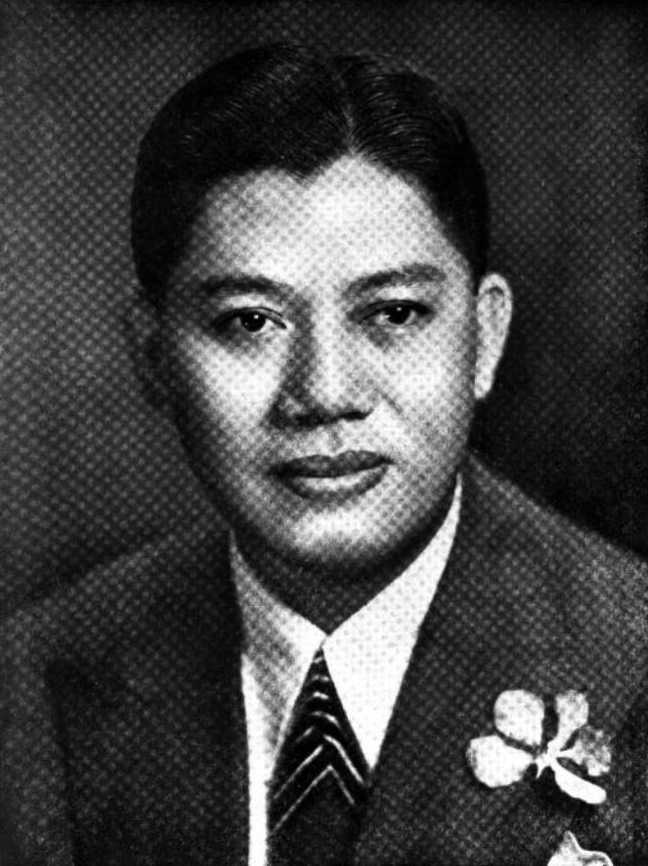
- Photograph from The Commercial & Industrial Manual of the Philippines, 1941

Senator of the Philippines
- In office 30 December 1941 – 30 December 1947

Member of the National Assembly from Negros Occidental's 2nd district
- In office 16 September 1935 – 30 December 1941
- Preceded by: Ramón Torres
- Succeeded by: district abolished

Secretary of Commerce and Industry
- In office 1957–1960
- Appointed by: Carlos P. Garcia
- Preceded by: Oscar Ledesma
- Succeeded by: Manuel Lim

Ambassador of the Philippines to Spain
- In office 15 September 1960 – 31 March 1962
- Appointed by: Carlos P. Garcia
- Preceded by: Pedro Sabido
- Succeeded by: Leon Maria Guerrero

Personal details
- Born: December 12, 1899 Talisay, Negros Occidental, Republic of Negros
- Died: June 21, 1978 (aged 78)
- Political party: Nacionalista (1941-1978)

Pedro Hernáez y Conlu (12 December 1899 - 21 June 1978) was a Filipino lawyer, politician, diplomat and Senator.

== Early life and career ==
Hernaez was born on 12 December 1899 in Talisay, Negros Occidental to Rosendo Hernaez and Teofila Conlu. He attended the Public School of Talisay and San Agustin College of Iloilo, and obtained his Bachelor of Arts degree from San Juan de Letran College and Bachelor of Laws degree from the Escuela de Derecho in 1921. He was admitted to the bar the same year.

He practiced law while working as a sugar industry executive in Negros as well, serving as President of the Talisay-Silay Sugar Planters Association.

== Political career ==
His first stint in politics was in 1934, when he was elected to represent Negros Occidental to the Constitutional Convention that drafted the 1935 Philippine Constitution. When the Philippine Commonwealth was established in 1935, he was elected to the National Assembly representing the 2nd District of Negros Occidental. There, he served as Chairman of the Committees on Banks and Corporations and was a main author of Commonwealth Act 326, which converted the municipality of Bacolod, Negros Occidental into a chartered city.

In 1941, he was elected to the Philippine Senate as a candidate of the Nacionalista Party but was not sworn in until 1945 due to the Japanese occupation of the country during the Second World War. He served in office until 1947. During this time, he was also appointed by President Manuel Roxas to the United Nations on 14 October 1946 as one of the Congressional Members of the Philippine Delegation and was later elected vice chairman of the United Nations General Assembly's Economic and Financial Committee, which dealt with postwar reconstruction, on 1 November that year.

In 1949, he ran again for the Senate but lost.

In 1957, he was appointed by President Carlos P. Garcia as his Secretary of Commerce and Industry, serving until 1960 when he was appointed Philippine Ambassador to Spain, serving until 1962.

== Personal life ==
Hernaez was married to Encarnacion de la Rama and had two children.

He died on 21 June 1978.
