= Oscar Ledesma =

Filipino lawyer, politician, diplomat

The Honorable Oscar Ledesma
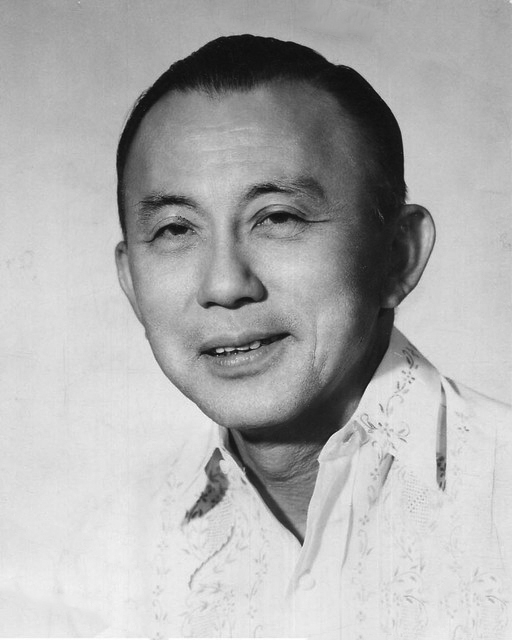

Ambassador of the Philippines to the United States
- In office 1964–1966
- Appointed by: Diosdado Macapagal
- Preceded by: Amelito Mutuc
- Succeeded by: Salvador P. Lopez

Senator of the Philippines
- In office 30 December 1957 – 30 December 1963

Secretary of Commerce and Industry
- In office 1953–1957
- Appointed by: Ramon Magsaysay
- Preceded by: Cornelio Balmaceda
- Succeeded by: Pedro Hernaez

Member of the House of Representatives from Iloilo's 2nd district
- In office 9 June 1945 – 30 December 1949
- Preceded by: district reestablished
- Succeeded by: Pascual Espinosa
- In office 10 December 1940 – 30 December 1941
- Preceded by: Ruperto Montinola
- Succeeded by: district abolished

16th Governor of Iloilo
- In office 1941–1942
- Preceded by: Tomás Confesor
- Succeeded by: Fermin Caram

Personal details
- Born: 3 August 1902 Silay, Negros Occidental, Philippine Islands
- Died: 17 December 1995 (aged 93) Quezon City, Philippines
- Party: Nacionalista
- Spouse: Juanita Javellana
- Children: 9, including Antonio

Oscar Benito Rufasta Ledesma (3 August 1902 – 17 December 1995) was a Filipino politician, lawyer, cabinet secretary and diplomat.

== Early life and education ==
Oscar Ledesma was born on 3 August 1902, in Silay, Negros Occidental. He was the son of a landowner and sugar baron. Ledesma received his Bachelor of Arts degree from the Ateneo de Manila. In 1925 he received his bachelor 's degree in law from the University of the Philippines. In the same year, he was admitted to the Bar.

== Political career ==
In 1940, Ledesma was appointed mayor of Iloilo City by President Manuel Quezon. In December of that year, Ledesma was elected in a special election to replace Ruperto Montinola, who died in office, as representative of the 2nd district of Iloilo in the National Assembly. He was reelected in 1941 but was not sworn in until 1945 due to the Japanese occupation of the country during the Second World War. During that period, he joined the guerrilla movement. Upon the resumption of Congress after Liberation in 1945, he was reelected in 1946 and served in office until 1949.

In 1953 he joined the cabinet of President Ramon Magsaysay as his Secretary of Commerce and Industry. After Magsaysay's death in office in 1957 he resigned from the cabinet and successfully ran for the Senate as a Nacionalista candidate, serving until 1963. In 1964, he was appointed by President Diosdado Macapagal as ambassador to the United States, serving until 1966. During his tenure, he was able to obtain a favorable quota for sugar exports to the US. In 1971, he was elected to the Constitutional Convention representing Iloilo.

== Personal life and death ==
Ledesma was married to Juanita Javellana. He died in his house in Quezon City after a long illness on 17 December 1995.
