= Cooperative Development Authority =

- Logo

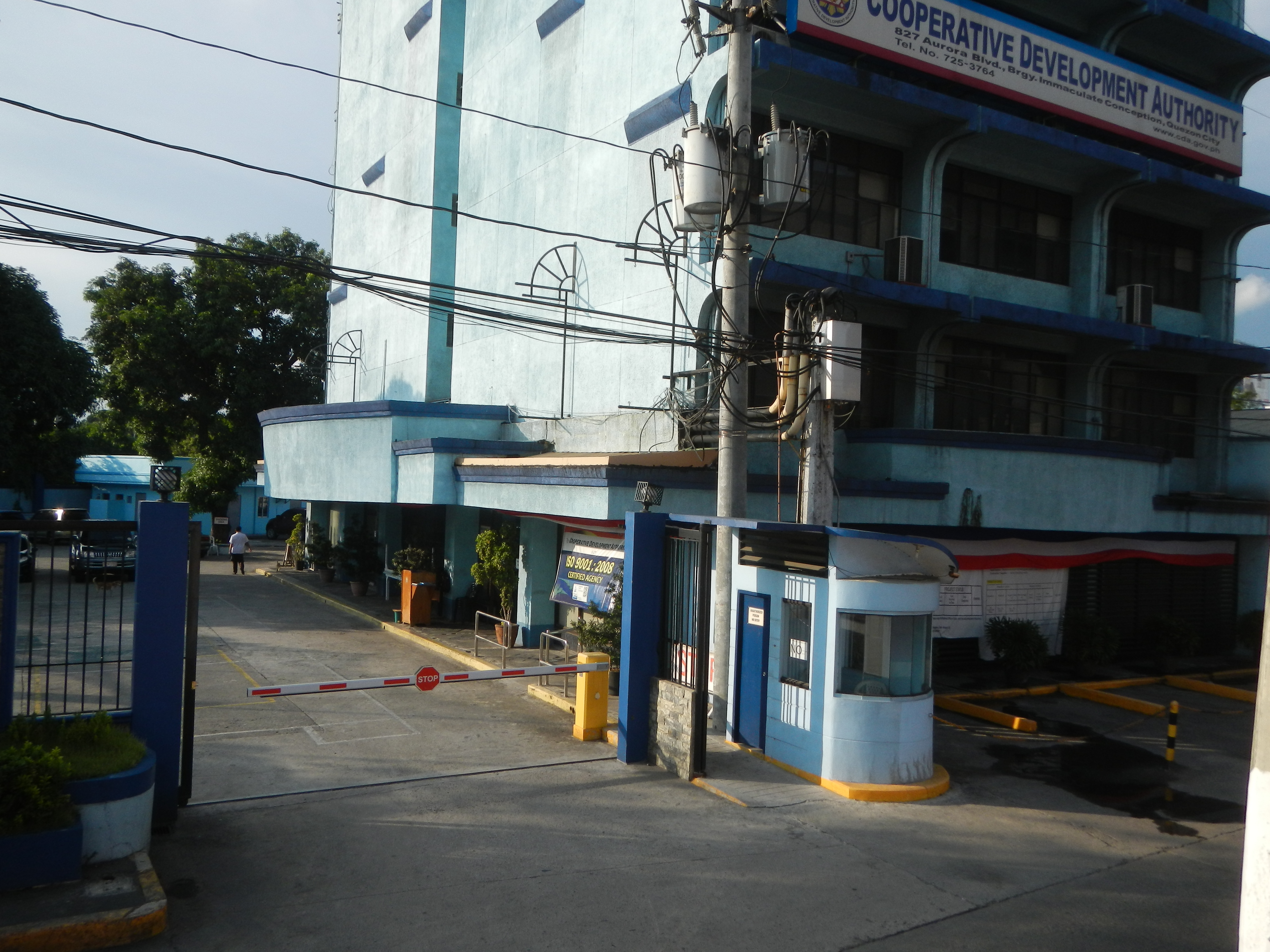
- Agency head office in Quezon City

Agency overview
- Formed: March 10, 1990
- Type: Cooperative development
- Headquarters: 827 Aurora Blvd., Brgy. Immaculate Conception, Cubao, Quezon City, Philippines
- Employees: 670 (2024)
- Agency executives: Joseph B. Encabo, Chairperson; Engr. Santiago S. Lim, Administrator
- Website: cda.gov.ph

The Cooperative Development Authority, shortened as CDA, is a government agency attached to the Department of Trade and Industry in charge to promote the viability and growth of cooperatives as instruments of equity, social justice and economic development.

It was established under Republic Act No. 6939 also known as the Cooperative Development Authority Act, as mandated by Republic Act No. 6939, the Cooperative Code of the Philippines. Republic Act No. 6939 was repealed and was replaced by Republic Act No. 9520, otherwise known as the "Philippine Cooperative Code of 2008." CDA's charter was repealed and replaced in August 2019 with Republic Act No. 11364, otherwise known as the "Cooperative Development Authority Charter of 2019."

== Powers and functions ==
As stated on its revised charter, some of the CDA's powers and functions are:

- Develop and formulate, in consultation with the cooperative sector and other concerned institutions, appropriate regulations, standards, rules, orders, guidelines and/or circulars to ensure the effective and sound operation of cooperatives;
- Formulate, adopt and implement integrated and comprehensive plans and programs on cooperative development consistent with the national policy on cooperatives and establish an integrated framework on cooperative development for all government agencies;
- Register all cooperatives including amendments to the Articles of Cooperation and Bylaws (ACBL), division, merger, and consolidation;
- Authorize the establishment of branches and satellite offices of cooperatives;
- Issue Certificate of Recognition to organized Laboratory Cooperatives;
- Exercise supervision and jurisdiction over all types and categories of cooperatives registered;
- Require the submission of annual reports, audited financial statements, and such reports;
- Promulgate and issue guidelines on the specific use and utilization of statutory funds and obligations that will achieve the real intent and spirit of establishing such funds and obligations for the benefit of the cooperatives and communities they serve;
- Prescribe and collect reasonable fees, fines or charges in the performance of its registration and regulatory functions;
- Require registered cooperatives to develop business continuity plans to address all kinds of risks;
- Grant awards, recognition and incentives to cooperatives, cooperative leaders and partners;
- Order the dissolution and liquidation of cooperatives as well as the transfer of all or substantially all of their assets and liabilities;
- Compel the cooperative to call a general or representative assembly, as deemed necessary, under the supervision of the Authority with the participation of their respective cooperative federations or unions;
- Hear and decide inter-cooperative and intra-cooperative disputes, controversies and/or conflicts, without prejudice to filing of civil and/or criminal cases by the parties concerned before the regular courts: Provided, That all decisions of the CDA are appealable directly to the Court of Appeals;
- Exercise such other powers and functions as may be necessary to implement the provisions of Republic Acts No. 11364 and 9520.

== CDA Board ==
The CDA is composed of the Chairperson, with the rank and privilege of an Undersecretary, and six (6) Members of the Board, with the rank and privilege of an Assistant Secretary, all of whom shall be appointed by the President of the Philippines and chosen among the nominees from the cooperative sector. There shall be one (1) board of director from each of cluster of cooperatives. The Secretaries of the Department of Trade and Industry (DTI) and the Department of the Interior and Local Government (DILG) serves as ex officio Members of the Board and may designate an alternate in a permanent capacity with a rank of at least an Assistant Secretary.

== CDA Administration ==
General executive direction and supervision of the work and operation of the CDA is performed by an Administrator. The administrator is appointed by the President of the Philippines, as recommended by the Board of Directors, who shall have the rank of an Assistant Secretary.

Five (5) Deputy Administrators appointed by the Board of Directors shall assist the Administrator, and who will be charged with the following specific concerns:

- General Administration and Support Services;
- Institutional Development;
- Legal Affairs;
- Registration, Supervision and Examination; and
- Credit Surety Fund (CSF).
