= Leonardo S. Sarao =

Filipino businessman

Leonardo Sarao
- Born: 13 April 1921; Imus, Cavite, Insular Government of the Philippine Islands, U.S.
- Died: 31 July 2001 (aged 80); Las Piñas, Metro Manila, Philippines
- Education: Elementary education
- Years active: 1953–2001
- Organization: Sarao Motors
- Known for: Designing and popularizing the jeepney
- Parent(s): Zacarias Sarao and Maria Salvador
- Awards: TOFIL Award in 1991 for Entrepreneurship

Leonardo Salvador Sarao (13 April 1921 – 31 July 2001) was the founder and owner of the Sarao Motors, a company known for designing, manufacturing and selling the jeepney, the most popular mode of transportation in the Philippines. He is not the first person to alter the surplus jeeps left behind by the United States Army from World War II, but he saw them as a business opportunity for mass transportation. He redesigned the surplus jeeps to increase its functionality by extending the body to accommodate at least twice the number of passengers and by putting some railings at the back and top for extra passengers to cling to, and for cargoes. He revolutionized a burgeoning industry and changed the life of generations of Filipinos.

Leonardo Sarao was awarded The Outstanding Filipino Award (TOFIL) in 1991 for Entrepreneurship. He started Sarao Motors from a borrowed PHP700. Though he only attained Grade 6 level of education because of poverty, he was able to make the company grow into a multimillion peso conglomerate.
