= Sarao Motors =

Filipino automotive manufacturing company

Coordinates: 14°28′21″N 120°58′30″E

Sarao Motors, Inc.
- Type: Private
- Industry: Automotive
- Founded: 1953 (as an automotive shop); 1962 (as a corporation)
- Founder: Leonardo S. Sarao
- Headquarters: Pulang Lupa, Las Piñas, Metro Manila, Philippines
- Area served: Nationwide
- Key people: Rafael Sarao, Sr. Ernesto Sarao; Eduardo Sarao
- Products: Jeepney
- Production output: 12 to 15 units per day (peak)
- Website: Facebook

Sarao Motors, Inc. is a Filipino automotive manufacturing company headquartered in Las Piñas, Metro Manila, the Philippines. The company specializes in designing, engineering, manufacturing, and distributing the jeepney.

== History ==
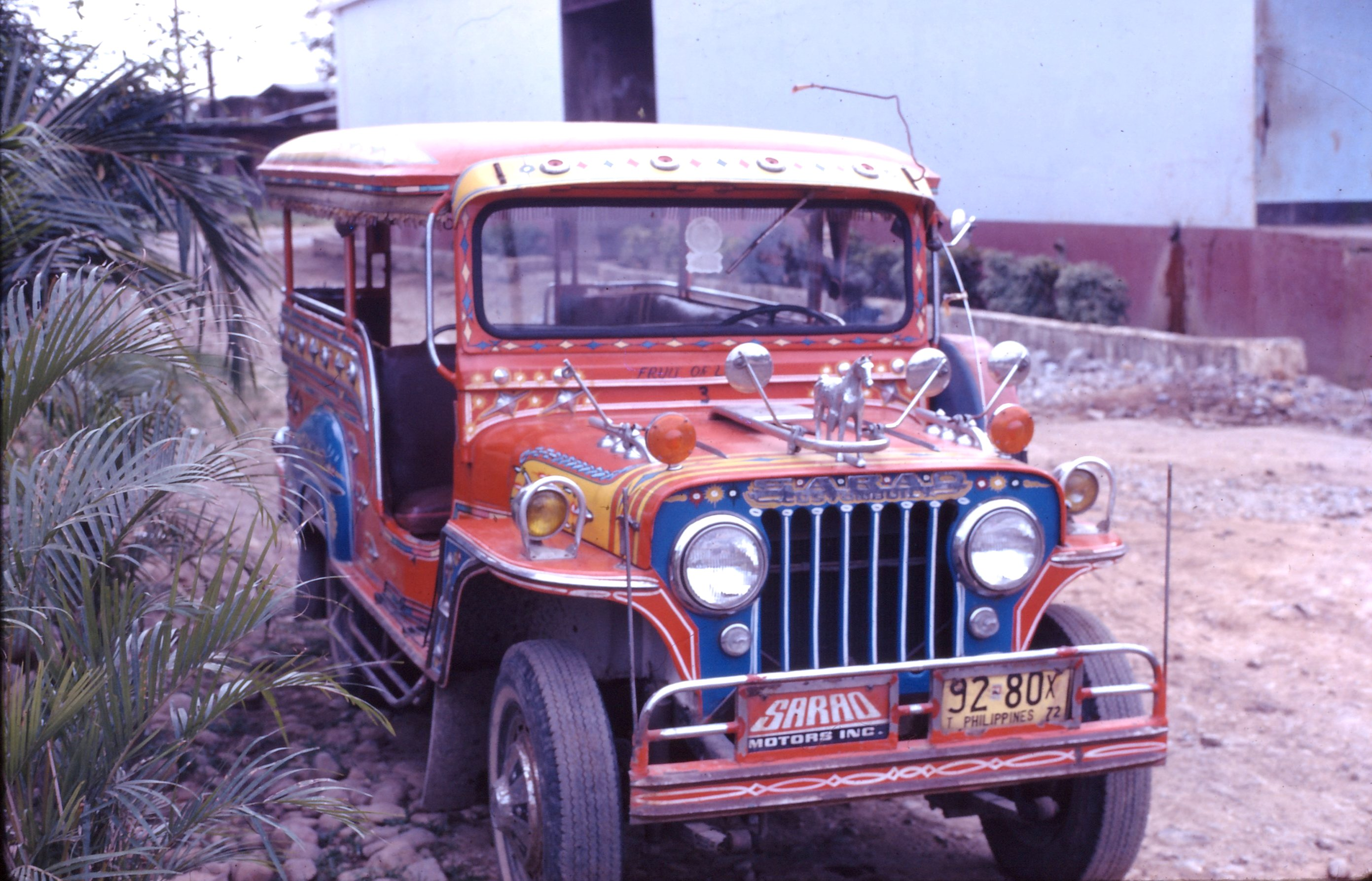
A Sarao jeepney in Olongapo in 1973

Sarao Motors was established in 1953 by Leonardo Sarao, a former kalesa driver turned mechanic, as a small automotive shop with an initial budget of ₱700 (equivalent to ₱91,211 in 2021). The company grew into a multimillion corporation that produced the majority of jeepneys in the Philippines. At its peak, the ratio of Sarao jeepneys rolling the streets of Manila outnumbered other brands by almost 7 to 1, making the Sarao name synonymous with the vehicle.

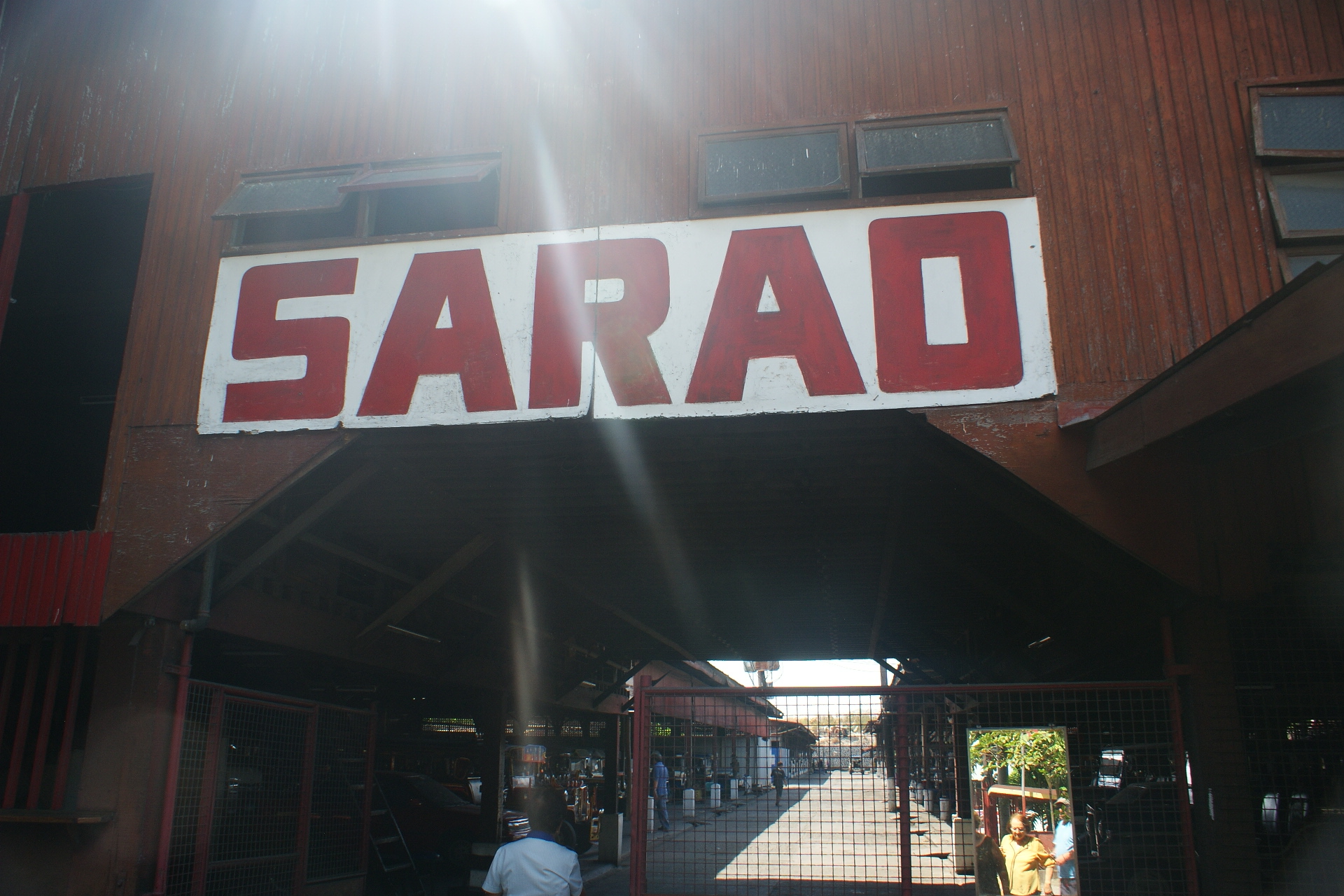
Jeepney factory

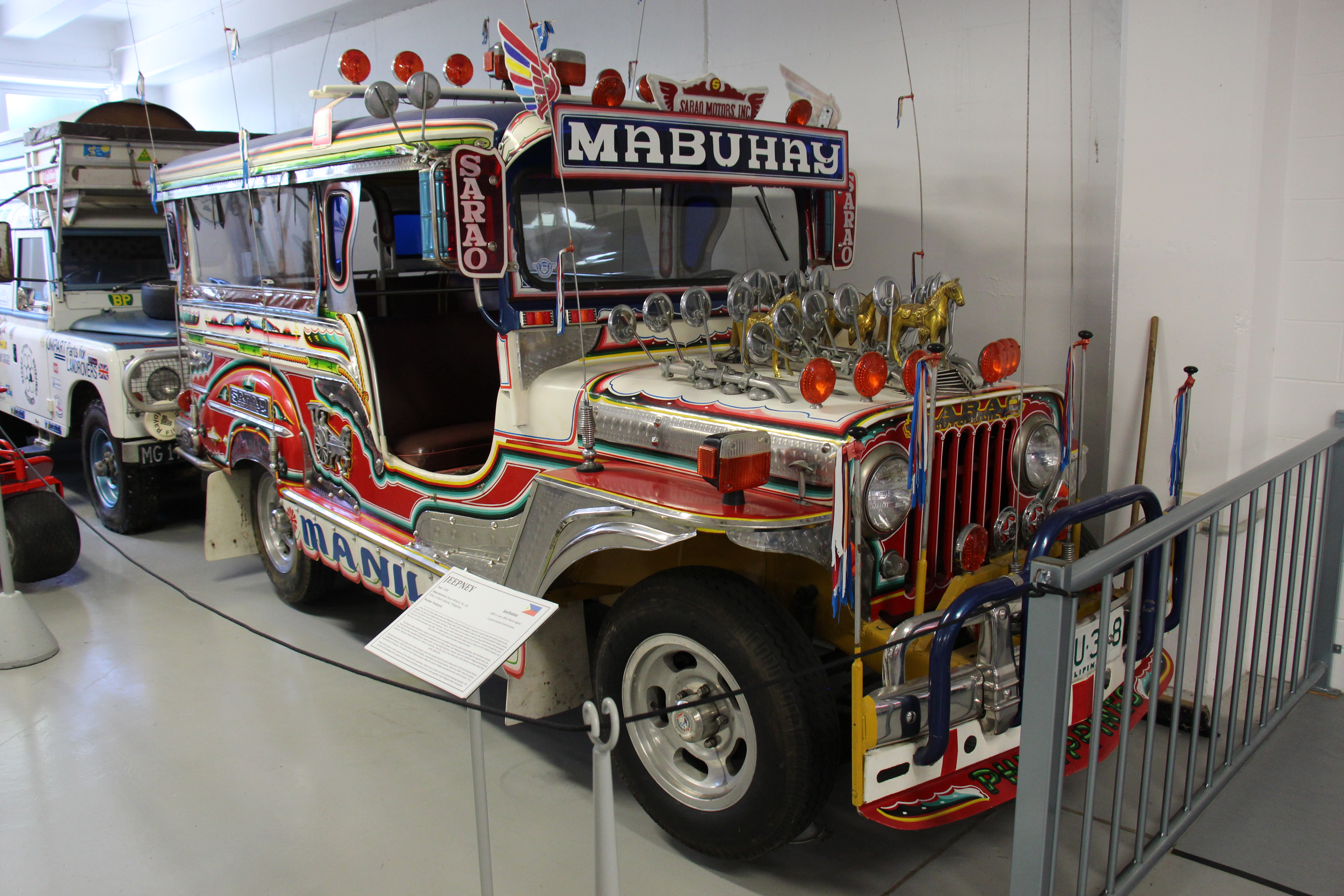
1988 Sarao Jeepney in Southward Car Museum, New Zealand

Sarao promoted the jeepney as a symbol of Philippine culture, and its vehicles have represented the country in several events. In 1964, a Sarao jeepney was exhibited at the Philippine pavilion at the New York World's Fair as a national image for Filipinos. In 1971, a Sarao jeepney traveled from Manila to London and all over Europe as part of the London-Manila Express, a roadshow sponsored by the Philippine Tourism and Travel Association to boost the country's tourism and industry to European countries.

In 2000, rising costs forced Sarao Motors to halt jeepney production, resulting in a downsizing of its workforce from 300 to only 50 employees. The collection department was the only part of the company that remained operational. The company eventually resumed operations on a smaller scale.

== Products ==
Aside from the jeepney, Sarao Motors also manufactures custom-built owner-type jeepneys and other types of vehicles for schools, businesses, and other institutions.

In 1981, Pope John Paul II rode a specially built owner-type jeepney by Sarao during his first visit to the country.
