= National Citizens' Movement for Free Elections =

Philippines nonprofit organization

- Founded: October 10, 1983
- Type: Non-profit organisation Non-governmental organization
- Location: Philippines
- Services: Election monitoring
- Fields: Advocacy, research, activism, media exposure
- Key people: Angel Averia Jr. (National Chairperson)
- Website: namfrel.org.ph

The National Citizens' Movement for Free Elections (NAMFREL) is an election watchdog in the Philippines. It was the first and one of the most prominent election watch campaigns. It is known to have introduced non-partisan national election monitoring to the Philippines after exposing issues surrounding the 1986 snap election.

NAMFREL was co-founded by Jose Concepcion Jr., who was its first national chairperson. NAMFREL was formally organized in October 1983 as an offshoot of the New Voters Registration Committee, which was formed in the 1960s. It currently has the support of more than 140 benefactors and 125 organizations. Its current national chairperson is Angel Averia Jr.

NAMFREL's goal is to ensure "free, orderly and honest elections" in the Philippines. It is a non-partisan organization with over 250,000 member-volunteers from different religious, civic, business, professional, labor, youth, educational, and non-government organizations.

The Commission on Elections (COMELEC) has accredited NAMFREL as its "citizens' arm" since 1986 to conduct manual parallel counts, which it called "Operation Quick Count". In 1986, NAMFREL mobilized 500,000 volunteers nationwide to guard the snap presidential election. Then-President Ferdinand Marcos declared himself the winner of the election; the NAMFREL count, however, showed that Corazon Aquino won. In the days that followed, the EDSA People Power revolt took place, sweeping Aquino to power.

For the May 2010 automated Philippine presidential election, NAMFREL was not accredited to conduct its own count. Instead, the organization conducted a nationwide election observation mission called "Bantay ng Bayan" ("sentinels of the people").

Presently, NAMFREL is also active internationally, with its officers and volunteers having worked as trainers, observer team members, election administrators, and resource persons in 35 countries. It has also sent volunteers as the official Philippine observer delegation to Cambodia during its 1998 parliamentary election, as well as to Indonesia for its 1999 presidential election after the fall of Suharto.

In 1998, NAMFREL representatives attended the International IDEA conference in Copenhagen.

== See also ==
- Philippine electoral crisis, 2005
- Comando Con Venezuela
