= Department of Trade and Industry (Philippines) =

Executive department of the Philippine government

- Kagawaran ng Kalakalan at Industriya
- Logo

Department overview
- Formed: June 23, 1898; 128 years ago
- Preceding agencies: Department of Commerce; Department of Commerce and Industry; Department of Industry; Department of Trade; Ministry of Trade and Industry
- Headquarters: Trade and Industry Building, 361 Gil Puyat Avenue, Bel-Air, Makati, Philippines; 14°33.6′N 121°1.8′E
- Employees: 2,204 (2024)
- Annual budget: ▲PH₱7.17 billion (2025)
- Department executives: Sec. Maria Cristina Roque, Secretary; Engelbert Josef G. Chua, Assistant Secretary for Special Concerns and Chief of Staff, Office of the Secretary
- Website: www.dti.gov.ph

The Department of Trade and Industry (DTI; Filipino: Kagawaran ng Kalakalan at Industriya) is the executive department of the Philippine government responsible for the advancement, promotion, governance, regulation, management and growth of industry and trade.

Department Order No. 19-18, s. 2019, laid out the organizational structure of the department into the following functional groups: Competitiveness and Innovation Group (CIG); Consumer Protection Group (CPG); Industry Development and Trade Policy Group (IDTPG); Management Services Group (MSG); Regional Operations Group (ROG); and the Trade Promotions Group (TPG).

Its hierarchical organization includes 27 foreign trade service posts, 17 regional offices (including Negros Island Region), 87 provincial/city/area offices, 12 bureaus, 4 attached agencies, 7 attached corporations, and 8 services offices.

The department is headed by a Secretary (equivalent to Minister) and assisted by Undersecretaries (equivalent to Deputy Minister) which take charge of certain sub-department each, and Assistant Secretaries which serve as specialized assistants of the Secretary.

== History ==
=== Department of Commerce and Police ===
On September 6, 1901, the Philippine Commission established the Department of Commerce (and Police) of the Insular Government. Luke Edward Wright was its first commissioner from 1901 to 1904. He was succeeded by William Cameron Forbes, future Governor-General of the Philippines, who served as its commissioner from 1904 through 1909.

=== Department of Commerce and Communications ===
After the Philippine Commission was abolished, the Department of Commerce and Police was reorganized as the Department of Commerce and Communications, enacted by the Philippine Legislature in November 1916 and became fully effective on January 15, 1917. Dionisio Jakosalem was appointed as the department's secretary and Cayetano Lavadia as its undersecretary.

=== Department of Commerce and Industry (DCI) ===
After World War II, President Manuel Roxas issued Executive Order (EO) No. 94 on October 4, 1947, creating the Department of Commerce and Industry (DCI). Cornelio Balmaceda, a much sought-after professor of economics and director of the Bureau of Commerce (BOC), was appointed acting secretary of the newly created Department of Commerce and Industry.

Prior to EO 94, the Bureau of Commerce was tasked to develop and promote the country's trade and industry, under the overall supervision of the Department of Agriculture and Commerce, as stipulated by Act 4007 by the Philippine Legislature, enacted on December 5, 1932.

By 1972, the DCI had grown into a big organization with 10 regular bureaus and 22 agencies under its direct supervision. The DCI was mandated to promote, develop, expand, regulate and control of foreign and domestic trade and industry, as well as tourism.

To have closer supervision and to ensure more effective delivery of services, President Ferdinand E. Marcos issued Presidential Decree (PD) 189 on May 11, 1973, creating the Department of Tourism to handle all tourism-related matters. A year later on June 21, 1974, Marcos issued PD 488 creating the Department of Industry whose principal function was to promote and enhance the growth of the country's existing and thriving industries.

On June 2, 1975, the Department of Trade was created under PD 721 to pursue efforts of the government toward strengthening the country's socio-economic development, particularly in the area of commercial activities. A key strategy of the new department was vigorous export promotion to generate much needed foreign exchange. A Bureau of Foreign Trade was also particularly established to push for domestic trade and marketing programs.

In the early 1980s, this goal of national economic development required the need to hew industrial promotion efforts with the expansion of Philippine trade overseas. This resulted in the creation of the Ministry of Trade and Industry (MOTI) on July 27, 1981, which took over the functions of the subsequently abolished Departments of Trade and of Industry.

Drastic changes followed after the 1986 EDSA Revolution. President Corazon Aquino signed Executive Order No. 133 on February 27, 1987, effectively reorganizing the Ministry of Trade and Industry and renaming it the Department of Trade and Industry (DTI). This was further strengthened by the issuance of Executive Order 292 (Administrative Code of 1987). Other latter legislations have also amended its functions and structures.

== Organizational structure ==
The department is headed by the Secretary of Trade and Industry (Philippines) with the following seven undersecretaries and five assistant secretaries:

- Undersecretary for Competitiveness and Innovation Group
- Undersecretary for Consumer Protection Group
- Undersecretary for Industry Development and Trade Policy Group
- Undersecretary for Management Services Group
- Undersecretary for Regional Operations Group
- Undersecretary for Communications
- Undersecretary/Chief of Staff, Office of the Secretary
- Assistant Secretary for Foreign Trade Service Corps
- Assistant Secretary for Regional Operations Group
- Assistant Secretaries for Industry Development and Trade Policy Group
- Assistant Secretary, Office of the Secretary

== Attached agencies and corporations ==
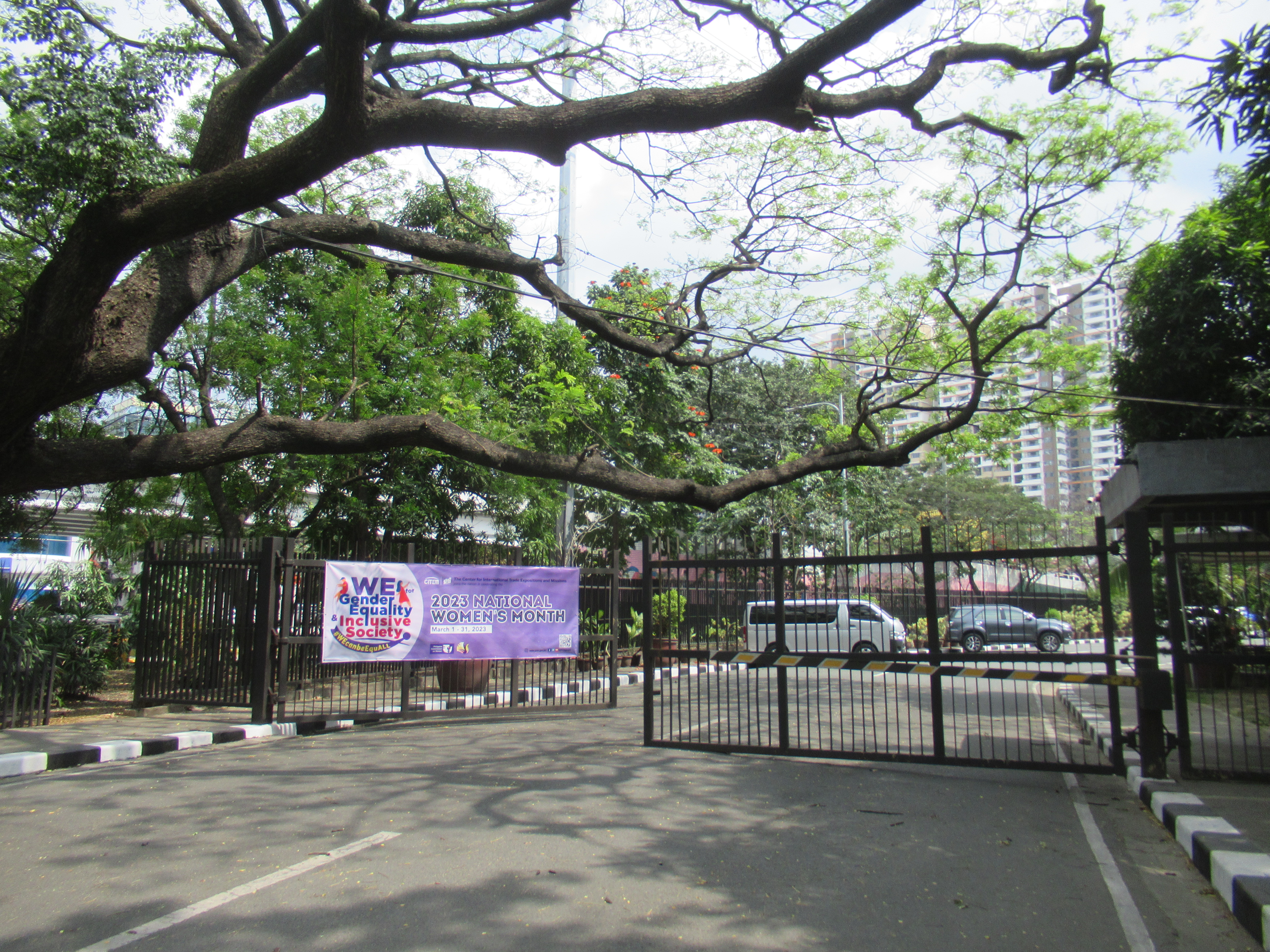
Center for International Trade Expositions and Missions (CITEM)

The following are attached to the Department of Trade and Industry:

- Board of Investments (BOI)
- Center for International Trade Expositions and Missions (CITEM)
- Construction Industry Authority of the Philippines (CIAP)
- Cooperative Development Authority (CDA)
- Design Center of the Philippines (DCP)
- Film Academy of the Philippines
- Philippine Trade Training Center (PTTC)
- Intellectual Property Office of the Philippines (IPOPHL)
- National Development Company (NDC)
- Philippine Contractors Accreditation Board (PCAB)
- Philippine Creative Industries Development Council (PCIDC)
- Philippine Economic Zone Authority (PEZA)
- Philippine International Trading Corporation (PITC)
- Philippine Pharma Procurement Incorporated (PPPI)
- Small Business Corporation (SB Corp)

Attached agencies are actually sub-agencies of any national departments of the national government organization in the Philippines in which creation is established by special laws and its operation is independent of its mother unit. The mother unit only serves as supervisory on these special attached agencies.

== See also ==
- List of company registers
- United States Department of Commerce
