= List of executive orders by Fidel V. Ramos =

Listed below are executive orders signed by Philippine President Fidel V. Ramos.

== 1992 ==
No.	Title	Date signed
1	Reducing the rates of import duty on electric generating sets under Presidential Decree No. 1464, otherwise known as the Tariff and Customs Code of 1978, as amended	June 30, 1992
2	Extending the effectivity of the zero rate of import duty on cement and cement clinker under Section 104 of Presidential Decree No. 1464, otherwise known as the Tariff and Customs Code of 1978, as provided under Executive Order No. 387	July 1, 1992
7	Providing for the creation of an extension office of the Office of the President in Mindanao and Visayas, assigning a Presidential Assistant for Mindanao and Visayas, defining their functions, powers and responsibilities	July 5, 1992
3	Creating a Presidential Anti-Crime Commission to identify and cause the investigation and prosecution of criminal elements in the country	July 7, 1992
4	Revoking the provisions of Executive Order No. 494 dated December 6, 1991 on the Philippine Coconut Authority	July 11, 1992
5	Amending Section 1 of Executive Order No. 2 dated 01 July 1992	July 14, 1992
6	Providing for the creation of the Presidential Council for Countryside Development	July 14, 1992
8	Restructuring the rates of import duties and amending the classification of certain articles under Section 104 of the Tariff and Customs Code of 1978, as amended	July 24, 1992
10	Requiring government and private financial institutions to use financial statements filed with and certified by the Bureau of Internal Revenue in evaluating loan applications	August 4, 1992
9	Transferring the National Stud Farm from the Philippine Racing Commission, Office of the President to the Department of Agriculture	August 7, 1992
11	Extending the life of the Committee on Privatization and the Asset Privatization Trust, and for other purposes	August 10, 1992
12	Providing for the creation of the Presidential Commission to Fight Poverty	August 15, 1992
13	Reconstituting and renaming the Presidential Committee on the Philippine Nuclear Power Plant as Presidential Committee on the Bataan Nuclear Power Plan	August 19, 1992
14	Granting an across-the-board pension increase to all SSS & EC pensioners and supplemental pensions to SSS permanent partial disability pensioners	August 25, 1992
15	Creating a Philippine Council for Sustainable Development	September 1, 1992
16	Transferring the Technical Assistance Council of the Philippines and the Inter-Agency Technical Committee on Technical Cooperation Among Developing Countries from the Department of Foreign Affairs to the Office of the President pursuant to Book III, Title III, Chapter 10, Section 31, of the 1987 Administrative Code	September 1, 1992
17	Establishing the Technical Cooperation Council of the Philippines	September 1, 1992
18	Transferring the Technical Cooperation Council of the Philippines from the Office of the President to the Department of Foreign Affairs pursuant to Book III, Title III, Chapter 10, Section 31, of the 1987 Administrative Code	September 1, 1992
19	Constituting the National Unification Commission, prescribing its authority and functions and for other purposes	September 1, 1992
20	Further amending Sections 1 and 4 of Executive Order No. 309, s. 1987, entitled "Reorganizing the Peace and Order Council"	September 8, 1992
21	Authorizing the representation of the labor sector in the Price Coordinating Council	September 8, 1992
22	Transferring the National Irrigation Administration from the Department of Public Works and Highways to the Office of the President	September 14, 1992
23	Amending Section 2 of Executive Order No. 338, creating the Energy Coordinating Council	September 14, 1992
24	Strengthening the Export and Investment Development Council amending for this purpose Executive Order Nos. 499 and 520, to increase the government and private sector members of the council	October 5, 1992
25	Amending Executive Order No. 403 and further strengthening the Tripartite Industrial Peace Council	October 7, 1992
26	Prescribing procedures and sanctions to ensure speedy disposition of administrative cases	October 7, 1992
27	Directing the concerned departments to ensure the successful staging of the 1st Philippine Sports Summit this year	October 13, 1992
28	Creating the Coordinating Committee for the Twenty-Fourth ASEAN Economic Ministers (AEM) Meeting and the Post AEM Meeting with Japan on 19-24 October 1992	October 14, 1992
29	Amending Executive Order No. 198, series of	October 27, 1992
30	Establishing the Bondoc Development Program Office	October 28, 1992
31	Directing all government lending financial institutions to implement the Sugar Restitution Law	October 29, 1992
32	Amending Executive Order No. 160 to provide for the election of a Chairman from among the members of the Commission on Population Board	October 31, 1992
33	Amending Sections 1 and 2 of Executive Order No. 115, s. 1986 entitled "Reorganizing the National Security Council and defining its membership, function, and authority and other purposes	November 18, 1992
34	Amending Executive Order No. 309, series of 1987, reorganizing the Peace and Order Council	November 25, 1992
38	Reconstituting the ASEAN Free Trade Area (AFTA) Commission and providing funds therefor	November 27, 1992
37	Restating the privatization policy of the government	December 2, 1992
39	Creating the Philippine National AIDS Council (PNAC) as a national policy and advisory body in the prevention and control of HIV (Human Immunodeficiency Virus) infection and AIDS in the Philippines	December 3, 1992
40	Implementing the provisions of Republic Act No. 7227 authorizing the Bases Conversion and Development Authority (BCDA) to raise funds through the sale of Metro Manila military camps transferred to BCDA to form part of its capitalization and to be used for the purposes stated in said Act	December 8, 1992
41		December 9, 1992
42	Amending Executive Order No. 19, dated September 1, 1992, constituting the National Unification Commission and prescribing its authority and functions and for other purposes	December 11, 1992
43	Modifying the rates of import duty on certain imported articles as provided under the Tariff and Customs Code of 1978, as amended, in order to implement the 1991 and 1992 Philippine programmes submitted during the Third ASEAN Summit providing a minimum level of 25% margin of preference to certain items which are in the Philippine exclusion list and deepening the margins of preference in respect of certain items which are under the ASEAN Preferential Trading Arrangements	December 29, 1992

== 1993 ==
No.	Title	Date signed
45	Adopting the Philippine Reference System of 1992 as the standard reference system for surveys in the Philippines	January 5, 1993
46	Constituting the Bipartisan Executive-Legislative Advisory Council on the Sabah Issue	January 11, 1993
47	Creating the Zamboanga City Council of Elders	January 12, 1993
48	Requiring the collection of qualifying fees for players entering the casino	January 19, 1993
49	Directing the mandatory use of the Philippine National Drug Formulary (PNDF) Volume I as the basis for procurement of drug products by the government	January 21, 1993
50	Amending Executive Order No. 503, dated January 22, 1992, to grant authority to national government agencies concerned affected by the devolution, to reorganize and restructure as a result of the devolution process	January 21, 1993
51	Directing local government units to revise their 1993 annual budgets to address the funding requirements of devolved national government agency functions, enjoining the national government agencies concerned to advance such funding requirement for their devolved functions against regular 1993 allotments pending enactment of the revised 1993 annual budgets and instructing the Secretary of Budget and Management to promulgate and issue the rules, regulations and guidelines to be observed for the purpose	January 22, 1993
52	Requiring the indication of taxpayer identification number (TIN) on certain documents	January 22, 1993
53	Directing all government agencies concerned to provide the Bureau of Internal Revenue with the necessary information to help increase tax collections	January 22, 1993
54	Directing the yearly publication of list of persons who filed income tax returns and paid income taxes	January 22, 1993
55	Reconstituting and further strengthening the Government Corporate Monitoring and Coordinating Committee and for other purposes	February 8, 1993
56	Declaring that administrative supervision over the Professional Regulation Commission pertains to the Office of the President	February 9, 1993
57	Authorizing owners and/or users of unregistered or unauthorized water/sewer connections, devices or instruments to comply with MWSS rules and regulations, without penalty, under the "MWSS Operation Linis" Program	February 15, 1993
58	Creating an inter-agency executive committee to oversee the comprehensive redevelopment of the National Housing Authority property in North Triangle, Quezon City	February 15, 1993
59	Prescribing the policy guidelines for compulsory interconnection of authorized public telecommunications carriers in order to create a universally accessible and fully integrated nationwide telecommunications network and thereby encourage greater private sector investment in telecommunications	February 24, 1993
60	Creating the Inter-Agency Committee on Intellectual Property Rights	February 26, 1993
61	Modifying the nomenclature and rates of import duty of certain articles under Section 104 of the Tariff and Customs Code of 1978, as amended, in implementation of Section 23 (10) of Republic Act No. 7607, the Magna Carta of Small Farmers	February 27, 1993
62	Prescribing policies and guidelines to implement Republic Act No. 7227	February 27, 1993
63	Creating the national, regional, provincial, city, municipal, and barangay physical fitness and sports development councils (PFSDC)	March 1, 1993
64	Adopting the national policy and program of "Sports for All" by all concerned government agencies based on the Sports Covenant forged during the 1st Philippine Sports Summit '92 held in Baguio City	March 1, 1993
65	Constituting the steering committee to undertake and coordinate the preparatory work for the Working Group on Marine Scientific Research in the South China Sea, and for other purposes	March 1, 1993
66	Extending the term of existence of the National Unification Commission from 16 March 1993 to 30 June 1993	March 4, 1993
67	Further amending Executive Order No. 19, dated September 1, 1992, as amended by Executive Order No. 42, dated December 11, 1992	March 9, 1993
68	Imposing an entrance fee at over-the-counter stores and shops operated by Duty Free Philippines	March 17, 1993
69	Creating the National Organizing Committee for the Third ASEAN Meeting of Ministers Responsible for Social Welfare	March 18, 1993
70	Providing for the expansion of the President's Summer Youth Work Program (PSYWP), and for other purposes	March 20, 1993
71	Devolving the powers of the Housing and Land Use Regulatory Board to approve subdivision plans to cities and municipalities pursuant to R.A. No. 7160, otherwise known as the Local Government Code of 1991	March 23, 1993
72	Providing for the preparation and implementation of the comprehensive land use plans of local government units pursuant to the Local Government Code of 1991 and other pertinent laws	March 25, 1993
73	Creating the Presidential Iron and Steel Committee	March 25, 1993
74	Directing the adoption of the country-team approach in the conduct of development diplomacy	March 29, 1993
75	Creating the National Heroes Committee under the Office of the President	March 29, 1993
76	Amending Executive Order No. 57 dated 15 February 1993 authorizing owners and/or users of unregistered or unauthorized water/sewer connections, devices or instruments to comply with MWSS rules and regulations, without penalty, under the "MWSS Operation Linis" Program	March 31, 1993
77	Amending Executive Order No. 508, s. of 1993, "Instituting the Lingkod Bayan Award as the Presidential Award for Outstanding Public Service"	March 31, 1993
78	Modifying the rates of import duty on certain imported articles as provided under the Tariff and Customs Code of 1976, as amended, in order to implement the minimum ninety per centum (90%) margin of preference on soya sauce powder and bouillon/stocks included in the Nestle ASEAN Industrial Joint Venture (AIJV) Projects, as provided for in Article III, Paragraph 1 of the Revised Basic Agreement on AIJV	April 2, 1993
79	Modifying the rates of import duty on certain imported articles as provided under the Tariff and Customs Code of 1978, as amended, in order to implement the minimum 50% margin of preference on certain products included in the Brand-to-Brand Complementation Scheme in the automotive industry under the Basic Agreement of ASEAN Industrial Complementation	April 2, 1993
80	Authorizing the establishment of the Clark Development Corporation as the implementing arm of the Bases Conversion and Development Authority for the Clark Special Economic Zone, and directing all heads of departments, bureaus, offices, agencies and instrumentalities of government to support the program	April 3, 1993
81	Prescribing additional functions to the National Unification Commission	April 12, 1993
82	Establishing the National Training Center for Technical Education and Staff Development (NTCTESD) in the Department of Education, Culture and Sports	April 15, 1993
83	Creating a Large Taxpayers Division in the Bureau of Internal Revenue	April 24, 1993
84	Creating a Presidential Commission to formulate short and long-term plans for the development of Tagaytay City and its adjacent municipalities, and the Taal Volcano Island and its surrounding coastal municipalities	April 24, 1993
85	Establishing the coordinative and management mechanism for the implementation of the Cagayan de Oro-Iligan Corridor Special Development Project	May 5, 1993
86	Fixing the rate of return on rate base of the National Power Corporation at twelve percent of the rate base as defined in Section 4 of Republic Act No. 6395, as amended	May 5, 1993
87	Transferring the Traffic Engineering and Management-Project Management Office (TEAM-PMO) from the Department of Transportation and Communication to the Office of the President	May 6, 1993
88	Amending Executive Order No. 81 dated 12 April 1993 and transferring the functions provided therein to the National Reconciliation and Development Council from the National Unification Commission	May 12, 1993
89	Directing the implementation of a policy of accessibility and transparency in government	May 18, 1993
90	Requiring the owners of taxable imported motor vehicles with year models 1988 to 1992 to obtain clearances from the Bureau of Customs and Bureau of Internal Revenue as a precondition to the renewal of their registration with the Land Transportation Office	May 19, 1993
91	Amending Section 2 of Executive Order No. 73 (1993)	May 21, 1993
92	Providing specific periods for the review by regional development councils of infrastructures and other sectoral programs amending for this purpose Section 2 Subparagraph b (v) of Executive Order No. 308 (1987) as amended	May 31, 1993
93	Amending Executive Order No. 376 (series of 1989) "Establishing the Regional Project Monitoring and Evaluation System (RPMES)" and for other purposes	June 1, 1993
94	Reducing the import duty on cement and cement clinker under Section 104 of Presidential Decree No. 1464, otherwise known as the Tariff and Customs Code of 1978	June 1, 1993
95	Designating the Cooperative Development Authority as the lead government agency on cooperative promotion, development, regulation and calling on all government agencies with cooperative programs to coordinate these with the Cooperative Development Authority and for other purposes	June 8, 1993
96	Implementing rules and regulations on cooperative promotions, organization, development and supervision by local government units	June 8, 1993
97	Clarifying the tax and duty free incentive within the Subic Special Economic Zone pursuant to Republic Act No. 7227 (1992)	June 10, 1993
98	Reorganizing the Export and Investment Development Council into the Export Development Council	June 10, 1993
99	Prescribing guidelines on the performance of the National Anthem	June 12, 1993
100	Mandating the active participation of all government agencies nationwide in urban greening, through an Adopt-a-Street/Park Program	June 14, 1993
101	Revising the compensation plan of the Foreign Service of the Philippines	June 15, 1993
102	Creating the Metro Naga Development Council	June 18, 1993
97-A	Further clarifying the tax and duty-free privilege within the Subic Special Economic and Free Port Zone	June 19, 1993
103	Authorizing the establishment of the John Hay Development Corporation as the implementing arm of the Bases Conversion and Development Authority for Club John Hay, and directing all heads of departments, bureaus, offices, agencies and instrumentalities of government to support the program	June 29, 1993
104	Extending the term of existence of the National Unification Commission from 30 June 1993 to 31 July 1993	June 29, 1993
105	Institutionalizing the Transport Training Center as a regular unit of the University of the Philippines	July 2, 1993
106	Lifting the suspension of the application of the tariff concessions granted by the Philippines on refractory bricks under the ASEAN Preferential Trading Arrangements	July 10, 1993
107	Transferring the Traffic Engineering and Management-Project Management Office (TEAM-PMO) from the Office of the President to the Department of Public Works and Highways	July 12, 1993
108	Creating the Central Visayas Water and Sanitation Project Project Management Unit, providing funds therefor, and for other purposes	July 12, 1993
109	Policy to improve the provision of local exchange carrier service	July 12, 1993
110	Strengthening the Export Development Council (EDC) amending for this purpose Executive Order (E.O.) No. 98 to increase the government and private sector members of the council	July 13, 1993
111	Declaring and delineating the Port of Ozamis under the administrative jurisdiction of the Philippine Ports Authority	July 22, 1993
112	Establishing the National Science Teaching Instrumentation Center (NSTIC) in the Department of Education, Culture and Sports	July 22, 1993
113	Enjoining all sectors to participate in tree planting activities in support of environment and natural resources programs	July 22, 1993
114	Amending Executive Order No. 31	July 23, 1993
115	Increasing the special duties on crude oil and oil products under Section 104 of the Tariff and Customs Code of the Philippines, as amended	July 24, 1993
116	Amending Section 1 of Executive Order No. 94 dated 01 June 1993	July 29, 1993
119	Amending Executive No. 106 lifting the suspension of the application of the tariff concessions granted by the Philippines on refractory bricks under the ASEAN Preferential Trading Arrangements	August 9, 1993
117	Establishing an Inter Agency Task Force for Coastal Environmental Protection	August 11, 1993
118	Mandating the active participation of all government agencies nationwide in urban greening, through an Adopt-a-Street/Park Program	August 12, 1993
120	Directing the national government, its departments, bureaus, agencies and offices, including government-owned or controlled corporations, to adopt counter-trade as a supplemental trade tool with respect to the importation or procurement of foreign capital equipment, machinery, products, goods and services	August 19, 1993
121	Creating the Mt. Makiling Reserve Area and Laguna de Bay Commission	August 24, 1993
122	Providing for the surrender and licensing of loose firearms and establishing a central records unit for all firearms	September 13, 1993
123	Institutionalizing the Committee on Power Conservation and Demand Management	September 8, 1993
124	Establishing priorities and procedure in evaluating areas proposed for land conversion in regional agri-industrial centers/regional industrial centers, tourism development areas and sites for socialized housing	September 8, 1993
125	Defining the approach and administrative structure for government's comprehensive peace efforts	September 15, 1993
126	Lifting the ban on mining operations in northern Palawan, the Calamian Group of Islands and the areas around Malampaya Sound	September 15, 1993
127	Redefining the functions of the Instructional Materials Council of the Department of Education, Culture and Sports	September 30, 1993
128	Reconstituting the Committee for the Preparation of the National Centennial Celebrations in 1998	October 4, 1993
129	Establishing an institutional mechanism to curtail the activities of professional squatting syndicates and professional squatters and intensifying the drive against them	October 15, 1993
130	Instituting the Balik Scientist Program under the Department of Science and Technology	October 25, 1993
122-A	Limiting the initial coverage of Executive Order No. 122 entitled "Providing for the surrender and licensing of loose firearms and establishing a central records unit for all firearms" to unregistered firearms and providing for the operational cost of the computerization of firearms records	October 26, 1993
131	Facilitating the state funeral of deceased National Artists and National Scientists	October 26, 1993
132	Approving the streamlining of the Bureau of Internal Revenue	October 26, 1993
133	Devolving to the Autonomous Regional Government of the Autonomous Region in Muslim Mindanao the powers and functions of the Department of Health, the control, and supervision over its offices in the region and for other purposes	October 29, 1993
134	Governing the admission and stay in the Philippines, as temporary visitors, of Chinese nationals	November 4, 1993
135	Providing for the establishment of a Well-Coordinated Local Level Statistical System	November 6, 1993
137	Providing for the implementing rules and regulations governing the devolution of certain powers and functions of the National Meat Inspection Commission to the local government units pursuant to Republic Act No. 7160, otherwise known as the Local Government Code of 1991	November 28, 1993
138	Declaring and delineating the Virac Port Zone under the administrative jurisdtion of the Philippine Ports Authority	November 28, 1993
139	Creating the Kabataan: 2000 Steering Committee, the Action Officers Committee and the regional steering committee in implementation of the year-round Youth Work Program, Kabataan: 2000 and for other purposes	November 28, 1993
140	Rationalizing the duty free stores/outlets and their operations in the Philippines and for other purposes	November 30, 1993
141	Creating the National Organizing Committee for the Third ASEAN Meeting of Ministers Responsible for Information	December 7, 1993
142	Transferring some projects of the Southern Philippines Development Authority (SPDA) to the Autonomous Regional Government in the Autonomous Region in Muslim Mindanao	December 10, 1993
143	Directing the Housing and Urban Development Coordinating Council to oversee the implementation of a Local Government Pabahay Program, and defining the responsibilities of certain agencies which will be involved therein	December 13, 1993
144	Amending Executive Order No. 84, dated April 24, 1993, which created a Presidential Commission to formulate short and long-term plans for the development of Tagaytay City and its adjacent municipalities, and the Taal Volcano Island and its surrounding coastal municipalities	December 14, 1993
145	Modifying the rates of duty on certain imported articles as provided for under the Tariff and Customs Code of 1978, as amended, in order to implement the 1994 Philippine schedule of tariff reductions on articles included in the Accelerated and Normal Programmes of the Common Effective Preferential Tariff (CEPT) Scheme for the ASEAN Free Trade Area (AFTA)	December 27, 1993
146	Amending Executive Order No. 43, series of 1992, by modifying the margins of preference and the applicable ASEAN preferential tariffs on certain items included in the coverage thereof	December 27, 1993
147	Modifying the rates of duty on certain imported articles as provided for under the Tariff and Customs Code of 1978, as amended, in order to implement the 10% margin of preference (MOP) granted by the Philippines under the Agreement on the Global System of Trade Preferences Among Developing Countries the Philippine schedule of concession annexed to the agreement	December 27, 1993
148	Modifying the rates of import duty on certain important articles as provided under Presidential Decree No. 1464, as amended, otherwise known as the Tariff and Customs Code of the Philippines of 1978, as amended	December 27, 1993
149	Streamlining of the Office of the President	December 28, 1993

== 1994 ==
No.	Title	Date signed
150	Amending Executive Order No. 156, series of 1968, as amended by Executive Order No. 163, series of 1968, constituting the "Fund for Assistance to Private Education" as an irrevocable trust, creating a "Private Education Assistance Committee" as trustee, and providing for the management thereof	January 10, 1994
151	Creating a Presidential Commission to investigate administrative complaints involving graft and corruption	January 11, 1994
151-A	Amending Executive Order No. 151 dated 11 January 1994	January 21, 1994
152	Providing for the creation of the National Program for Unification and Development Council (NPUDC) and for other purposes	January 21, 1994
153	Modifying the rates of duty on certain important articles as provided under the Tariff and Customs Code of 1978, as amended, in order to implement the minimum ninety per centum (90%) margin of preference on certain products included in the Nestle ASEAN Industrial Joint Ventures (AJIV) Projects, as provided for in Article III, Paragraph 1 of the Revised Basic Agreement on AIJV	January 25, 1994
154	Creating the National Organizing Committee for the Asia and Pacific Ministerial Conference in Preparation for the World Summit for Social Development	January 27, 1994
155	Amending Executive Order No. 149	February 3, 1994
156	Creating an inter-agency executive committee to assist the trustee committee for the comprehensive development of Welfareville property in the city of Mandaluyong	February 14, 1994
157	Establishing a Civil Registration System for Muslim Filipinos	February 15, 1994
158	Creating a Presidential Commission to formulate short and long-term plans for the restoration and preservation of the Ifugao rice terraces in the municipalities of Banaue, Hungduan, Mayoyao and Kiangan	February 18, 1994
161	Prescribing the adoption of new standard forms to be accomplished by officials and employees for overseas training	February 18, 1994
159	Directing all departments, bureaus, offices, units and agencies of the national government, including government-owned or controlled corporations, to revise their fees and charges at just and reasonable rates sufficient to recover at least the full cost of services rendered	February 23, 1994
160	Reducing the special duties of crude oil and oil products prescribed in Executive Order No. 115, series of 1993	February 23, 1994
162	Restoring to the Department of Environment and Natural Resources the jurisdiction, control, management, and development of the Angat Watershed Reservation	February 25, 1994
163	Declaring the Philippine National Games as the centerpiece program	March 3, 1994
164	Adopting a Revised Compensation and Position Classification System in the government	March 7, 1994
167	Creating the Iwahig Penal Colony Inter-Agency Study Committee	March 25, 1994
122-B	Providing for the full implementation of Executive Order No. 122 dated September 13, 1993 and extending the period for the registration of loose firearms and unre-registered firearms	March 28, 1994
168	Rules governing the admission and stay in the Philippines, as temporary visitors, of Chinese nationals	April 11, 1994
169	Declaring the continued existence of the Central Bank of the Philippines as the Central Bank Board of Liquidators, prescribing its powers and functions pursuant to the provisions of Section 132 (E) of Republic Act No. 7653, and for other purposes	April 17, 1994
170	Rationalizing and harmonizing traffic and transportation management powers and functions of agencies in Metropolitan Manila and for other purposes	April 20, 1994
171	Creating a Lingayen Gulf Coastal Area Management Commission	April 20, 1994
172	Increasing the minimum tariff rate from zero to three percent on articles under Section 104 of the Tariff and Customs Code of 1978 (Presidential Decree No. 1464), as amended	April 22, 1994
173	Amending Executive Order No. 153, series of 1994, entitled "Modifying the rates of duty on certain important articles as provided under the Tariff and Customs Code of 1978, as amended, in order to implement the minimum ninety per centum (90%) margin of preference on certain products included in the Nestle ASEAN Industrial Joint Ventures (AJIV) Projects, as provided for in Article III, Paragraph 1 of the Revised Basic Agreement on AIJV"	April 27, 1994
174	Designation of Clark Special Economic Zone (Clark Field) as the future site of a premier Philippine international airport	April 28, 1994
175	Creating a Northwestern Luzon Growth Quadrangle Commission	April 30, 1994
176	Approving and adopting the National Youth Development Plan (NYDP) 1994-1998	May 3, 1994
177	Establishing the World Expo 2002 Philippines Commission and for other purposes	May 16, 1994
178	Amending Executive Order No. 158, dated February 18, 1994, which created a Presidential Commission to formulate short and long-term plans for the restoration and preservation of the Ifugao rice terraces in the municipalities of Banaue, Hungduan, Mayoyao and Kiangan	May 23, 1994
179	Prominent display of the National Flag in all buildings, establishments, and homes from 28 May 1994 to 12 June 1994 and every year thereafter, and for other purposes	May 24, 1994
180	Strengthening the Export Development Council (EDC) amending for this purpose Executive Order (E.O.) No. 110, further amending E.O. No. 98	June 8, 1994
181	Prescribing the threshold amount of gross sales and/or receipts for value added tax purposes	June 14, 1994
182	First Regular Foreign Investment Negative List	June 22, 1994
183	Amending Executive Order No. 128, series of 1993, establishing the National Centennial Commission	June 22, 1994
184	Creating socialized housing one-stop processing centers to facilitate the processing and issuance of permits, clearances, certifications and licenses appropriate and necessary for the implementation of socialized housing projects, and directing all government agencies concerned to support the operations of the said centers	June 27, 1994
185	Opening the domestic water transport industry to new operators and investors	June 28, 1994
186	Expanding the coverage of the Cabinet Committee on the Law of the Sea and renaming it as the Cabinet Committee on Maritime and Ocean Affairs	July 12, 1994
187	Declaring and delineating the Jose Panganiban Port Zone under the administrative jurisdiction of the Philippine Ports Authority	July 13, 1994
188	Guidelines on the entry and stay of foreign students in the Philippines and the establishment of an inter-agency committee for the purpose	July 13, 1994
189	Modifying the nomenclature and rates of import duty on certain imported articles under Section 104 of the Tariff and Customs Code of 1978, as amended	July 18, 1994
190	Approving and adopting the National Information Technology Plan 2000 and establishing the National Information Technology Council	July 19, 1994
191	Granting no-visa entry for an initial stay of seven (7) days to Chinese nationals who are holders of Macau-Portuguese passport	July 22, 1994
192	Authorizing the establishment of the Clark International Airport Corporation to operate and manage the Clark Aviation Complex	July 27, 1994
193	Creating the World Trade Organization Advisory and ASEAN Free Trade Advisory Commissions, defining its powers and functions and for other purposes	August 2, 1994
195	Providing a Medical Care Program to Filipino overseas contract workers and their dependents and prescribing the mechanism therefor	August 13, 1994
196	Mandating government and national service agencies to extend full support to the ENR-SECAL Program	August 16, 1994
197	Creating a Presidential Commission to plan for and develop a growth corridor from the National Capital Region to the provinces of Rizal, Laguna and Quezon (Metro Manila-Rizal-Laguna-Quezon or Marilaque Growth Area)	August 29, 1994
199	Declaring and delineating the Dalahican Port Zone under the administrative jurisdiction of the Philippine Ports Authority	September 20, 1994
200	Institutionalization of the full computerization of the licensure examinations administered by the various regulatory boards under the supervision of the Professional Regulation Commission	September 20, 1994
201	Creating an Advisory Council of Veterans Affairs	September 20, 1994
202	Transferring the Securities and Exchange Commission to the Department of Finance	September 22, 1994
203	Creating the Oversight and Executive Committees for the National Government's Major Social Reform Agenda	September 27, 1994
204	Modifying the nomenclature and rates of import duty on certain imported articles under Section 104 of the Tariff and Customs Code of 1978, (Presidential Decree No. 1464), as amended	September 30, 1994
208	Further defining the composition, powers and functions of the National Commission on the Role of Filipino Women	October 10, 1994
210	Amending Section 6 of Executive Order No. 152, dated January 21, 1994	October 27, 1994
211	Placing the National Program for Unification and Development Council under the Office of the Executive Secretary and for other purposes	November 21, 1994
212	Accelerating the Demonopolization and Privatization Program for government ports in the country	November 28, 1994
213	Deregulating domestic shipping rates	November 28, 1994
214	Establishing the Presidential Awards for the Cleanest and Greenest Local Government Units of the Philippines	December 9, 1994
215	Prescribing additional measures to improve the delivery of health services devolved to local government units	December 13, 1994
216	Implementation of Section 12 of Republic Act 6975	December 16, 1994
217	Amending Section 1.2 (b) of Executive Order No. 203, dated 27 September 1994, "Creating the Oversight and Executive Committees for the National Government's Major Social Reform Agenda"	December 20, 1994

== 1995 ==
No.	Title	Date signed
218	Second year of implementation of the new salary schedule in the government	January 1, 1995
219	Establishing the Domestic and International Civil Aviation Liberalization Policy	January 3, 1995
221	Clarifying the authority and extent of the powers and functions of the Presidential Anti-Crime Commission	January 23, 1995
222	Establishing the Committee on Water Conservation and Demand Management	January 24, 1995
223	Amending Executive Order No. 175, dated April 30, 1994, which created a Northwestern Luzon Growth Quadrangle Commission	February 7, 1995
224	Transferring the management, administration and maintenance of Burnham Park to the city government of Baguio	February 10, 1995
226	Institutionalization of the doctrine of "command responsibility" in all government offices, particularly at all levels of command in the Philippine National Police and other law enforcement agencies	February 17, 1995
227	Reducing the rates of import duty on cement and cement clinker under Section 104 of Presidential Decree No. 1464, otherwise known as the Tariff and Customs Code of 1978, as amended	March 4, 1995
228	Amending Executive Order No. 203 to include the Presidential Legislative Liaison Office in the membership of the Social Reform Agenda Council	March 6, 1995
229	Further amending Executive Order No. 175, dated April 30, 1994, as amended by Executive Order No. 223, dated February 7, 1995, which created a Northwestern Luzon Growth Quadrangle Commission	March 19, 1995
230	Creating a National Secretariat of the National Correctional Consciousness Week	March 15, 1995
231	Creating the Presidential Fact-Finding and Policy Advisory Commission on the Protection of Overseas Filipinos	March 20, 1995
232	Abolishing the Presidential Task Force for the Development of Lungsod Silangan and Inter-Agency Task Force on Socialized Housing in Manggahan Floodway and transferring their powers and functions to the Presidential Commission on the Manila-Rizal-Laguna-Quezon (Marilaque) Growth Corridor	March 29, 1995
233	Extending the term of Samar Island Development Project Office	March 31, 1995
234	Establishing the Gingoog Bay Development Council	April 7, 1995
235	Amending Executive Order No. 101, dated June 15, 1993, entitled: "Revising the compensation plan of the Foreign Service of the Philippines"	April 19, 1995
236	Organizing the National Committee on Illegal Entrants, repealing E.O. 656, series of 1981, to ensure effective coordination among member agencies in the investigation and disposition of cases involving the illegal entry of foreign nationals and vessels, and providing funds for its operation	April 22, 1995
237	Modifying the rates of duty on certain important articles as provided under the Tariff and Customs Code of 1978, as amended, in order to implement the decision taken by the Thirty-Fifth Meeting of the Committee on Industry, Minerals and Energy (COIME) of the ASEAN Economic Ministers (AEM) to extend a minimum ninety per centum (90%) margin of preference (MOP) to constant velocity joint driveshafts assembly and parts thereof under the Agreement on ASEAN Industrial Joint Ventures	April 24, 1995
238	Declaring and delineating the Pagbilao Port Zone under the administrative jurisdiction of the Philippine Ports Authority	April 24, 1995
239	Declaring and delineating the Lopez Port Zone under the administrative jurisdiction of the Philippine Ports Authority	April 24, 1995
240	Creating fisheries and aquatic resource management councils (FARMCs) in barangays, cities and municipalities, their composition and functions	April 28, 1995
243	Creating a Nuclear Power Steering Committee	May 12, 1995
244	Directing the Committee on Scientific and Technical Cooperation with Socialist Countries to delete the People's Republic of China from the list of countries covered by Letter of Instructions No. 444	May 12, 1995
246	Reconstituting the National Action Committee on Anti-Hijacking as the National Action Committee on Anti-Hijacking and Anti-Terrorism	May 18, 1995
247	Prescribing guidelines and establishing a regulatory framework for the prospecting of biological and genetic resources, their by-products and derivatives, for scientific and commercial purposes; and for other purposes	May 18, 1995
248	Prescribing rules and regulations and new rates of allowances for official local and foreign travels of government personnel	May 29, 1995
249	Granting permanent resident status to certain Vietnamese citizens and Filipino-Vietnamese children pursuant to Section 47 of the Immigration Act of 1940	May 29, 1995
250	Implementing the rationalization of duty free stores/outlets and their operations in the Philippines pursuant to Executive Order No. 140 and for other purposes	June 2, 1995
241	Creating a steering committee for the proper observance of the Family Week	June 9, 1995
251	Declaring the island of Luzon as calamity area as a result of the foot and mouth disease epidemic, rationalizing public safety measures for the eradication of foot and mouth disease in the country, and appropriating funds therefore	June 15, 1995
252	Amending Executive Order No. 203 entitled: "Creating the Oversight and Executive Committees for the National Government's Major Social Reform Agenda"	June 19, 1995
253	Providing for the rationalization and upgrading of the existing passport extension offices of the Department of Foreign Affairs into regional consular offices	June 22, 1995
254	Creating the Philippine Gas Project Task Force	June 30, 1995
259	Further amending Executive Order No. 175 dated April 30, 1994, as amended by Executive Order No. 223 dated February 7, 1995 and Executive Order No. 229 dated March 19, 1995, which created a Northwestern Luzon Growth Quadrangle Commission	July 1, 1995
255	Final extension of the term of Samar Island Development Project Office	July 3, 1995
257	Creating a Project Coordinating Committee to implement the Philippine supplement to the Scientific American Journal	July 10, 1995
258	Establishing and delineating the responsibilities of the National Power Corporation and the Department of Environment and Natural Resources over watersheds and reservations under the former's jurisdiction and control, and restoring to the National Power Corporation jurisdiction and control over the Angat Watershed Reservation	July 10, 1995
260	Adjusting the dividend rates of selected government owned and/or controlled corporations on their 1994 earnings pursuant to Section 5 of Republic Act No. 7656	July 14, 1995
261	Creating an Inter-Agency Committee on Employment Promotion, Protection and Rehabilitation of Persons with Disabilities	July 17, 1995
263	Adopting community-based forest management as the national strategy to ensure the sustainable development of the country's forestlands resources and providing mechanisms for its implementation	July 19, 1995
264	Modifying the nomenclature and the rates of import duty on certain imported articles under Section 104 of the Tariff and Customs Code of 1978 (Presidential Decree No. 1464), as amended	July 22, 1995
266	Institutionalization of the Continuing Professional Education (CPE) programs of the various professional regulatory boards (PRBs) under the supervision of the Professional Regulation Commission (PRC)	July 25, 1995
267	Providing for the issuance of National Government Bonds to be known as Agrarian Reform (AR) Bonds	July 25, 1995
268	Amending Executive Order No. 208 (s. 1995) entitled "Further defining the composition, powers and functions of the National Commission on the Role of Filipino Women"	August 4, 1995
269	Amending Executive Order No. 182 which promulgates the First Regular Foreign Investment Negative List, specifically "List A" of Annex A	August 8, 1995
270	Requiring all Philippine diplomatic and consular posts to assist in organizing expatriate Filipino scientists, technologists, engineers, and allied professionals in their jurisdictions into overseas chapters of (Philippine) science and technology advisory councils (STACs)	August 9, 1995
248-A	Amending Executive Order No. 248, dated 29 May 1995 which prescribed rules and regulations and new rates of allowances for official local and foreign travels of government personnel	August 14, 1995
271	Governing the admission and stay of foreign nationals in the Subic Bay Freeport Zone as temporary visitors	August 14, 1995
272	Amending Executive Order No. 30 series of 1992, establishing the Bondoc Development Program Office	August 24, 1995
273	Approving and adopting the Philippine Plan for Gender-Responsive Development, 1995 to 2025	September 8, 1995
274	Establishing the Presidential Commission on Bicol Tourism Special Development Project	September 14, 1995
275	Creating a committee for the special protection of children from all forms of neglect, abuse, cruelty, exploitation, discrimination and other conditions prejudicial to their development	September 14, 1995
276	Formalizing the Inter-Agency Safety and Immunity Guarantees (SIG) Committee for the GRP-NDF Peace Talks	September 19, 1995
277	Directing the mode of treatment utilization, administration and management of the Coco Levy Funds	September 24, 1995
265	Amending Executive Order No. 315, as amended, thereby transferring and rationalizing the powers and functions of the Presidential Committee on the Bataan Nuclear Power Plant to various government agencies	October 4, 1995
278	Amending Executive Order No. 274 dated 14 September 1995, establishing the Presidential Commission on Bicol Tourism Special Development Project	October 10, 1995
279	Directing the dissolution of Philcorp Pty Ltd	October 13, 1995
280	Creating a Presidential Task Force on Intelligence and Counter-Intelligence to identify, arrest and cause the investigation and prosecution of military and other law enforcement personnel or their former members and their cohorts involved in criminal activities	October 16, 1995
282	Providing for the guidelines and regulations for the evolution of the Export Processing Zone Authority; created under Presidential Decree No. 66, into the Philippine Economic Zone Authority under Republic Act No. 7916	October 30, 1995
283	Granting the APEC-NOC authority for the procurement and exemption from the governing provisions of public bidding to fast-track the acquisition of necessary supplies, equipment and services for the 1996 Asia-Pacific Economic Cooperation Meeting	November 8, 1995
284	Declaring civilian victims of internal armed conflicts as part of a priority sectors under the Social Reform Agenda	November 11, 1995
281	Granting the National Irrigation Administration authority to construct, develop, operate and maintain the Casecnan Multi-Purpose Irrigation and Power Project located within the Casecnan River Watershed Forest Reserve in the province of Nueva Vizcaya and the Pantabangan-Carrangalan Watershed in the province of Nueva Ecija in consonance with the authority of the Department of Environment and Natural Resources over the watershed under Proclamation No. 136 and Proclamation No. 561, as amended	November 16, 1995
285	Amending Executive Order No. 202 (22 September 1994)	November 24, 1995
286	Reorganizing the Metropolitan Waterworks and Sewerage System (MWSS) and the Local Water and Utilities Administration (LWUA) pursuant to Republic Act No. 8041, otherwise known as the National Water Crisis Act of 1995	December 6, 1995
287	Modifying the rates of duty on certain important articles as provided under the Tariff and Customs Code of 1978, as amended, in order to implement the 1996 Philippine schedule of tariff reduction under the new time frame of the Accelerated Common Effective Preferential Tariff (CEPT) Scheme for the ASEAN Free Trade Area (AFTA)	December 12, 1995
288	Modifying the nomenclature and the rates of import duty on certain imported articles under Section 104 of the Tariff and Customs Code of 1978 (Presidential Decree No. 1464), as amended	December 12, 1995
289	Providing land for the Philippine Trade Center in accordance with Republic Act No. 7844	December 13, 1995
256	Revising Executive Order No. 58, s. 1987, by rationalizing the fees and charges on firearms, amunition, spare parts, accessories, components, explosives, explosive ingredients, pyrotechnics and firecrackers	December 21, 1995
250-A	Amending Executive Order No. 250 dated 2 June 1995 implementing the rationalization of duty free stores/outlets and their operations in the Philippines pursuant to EO 140 and for other purposes	December 22, 1995

== 1996 ==
No.	Title	Date signed
290	Third year implementation of the new salary schedule in the government	January 2, 1996
291	Improving the Environmental Impact Statement System	January 12, 1996
292	Constituting a consultative committee to advise the President in the appointment of Philippine National Police officials from the rank of Senior Superintendent to Director General	January 12, 1996
293	Streamlining the organizational and functional operations of the agencies attached to the Office of the Press Secretary	January 15, 1996
294	Amending Executive Order No. 289 (s. 1995) to provide additional control measures to safeguard the interest of the government in the land to be used for the establishment of the Philippine Trade Center and to address the export sector's concerns and interests in accordance with Republic Act No. 7844	January 16, 1996
295	Institutionalizing the policy of allocating a portion of the calamity fund for tree seedling propagation, planting and maintenance	January 17, 1996
296	Ordering the dismantling of fish cages, fish pens, fish traps and other aqua-culture structures in Taal Lake and the Pansipit River	January 22, 1996
297	Further amending Executive Order No. 84 dated 24 April 1993, as amended by EO 144, dated 14 December 1993 which created a Presidential Commission to formulate short and long-term plans for the development of Tagaytay City and its adjacent municipalities and the Taal Volcano Island and its surrounding coastal municipalities	January 26, 1996
298	Providing for alternative and/or intermediate modes of privatization pursuant to Proclamation No. 50 (s. 1986)	January 30, 1996
300	Amending Executive Order No. 234 dated 7 April 1995 which established the Gingoog Bay Development Council	January 31, 1996
293-A	Amending Executive Order No. 293 by excluding Channels 9 and 13 from the scope and coverage thereof	February 13, 1996
302	Providing policies, guidelines, rules and regulations for the procurement of goods/supplies by the national government	February 19, 1996
303	Declaring and delineating the Puerto Princesa City Port Zone under the administrative jurisdiction of the Philippine Ports Authority	February 19, 1996
304	Declaring and delineating the Brooke's Point Port Zone under the administrative jurisdiction of the Philippine Ports Authority	February 19, 1996
260-A	Amending Executive Order No. 260 entitled "Adjusting the dividend rates of selected government owned and/or controlled corporations on their 1994 earnings pursuant to Section 5 of Republic Act No. 7656"	February 20, 1996
307	Implementing a Family Planning Program at the local government level	February 28, 1996
309	Reconstituting the Disposal Committee created under E.O. No. 285	March 8, 1996
311	Encouraging private sector participation in the operations and facilities of the Metropolitan Waterworks and Sewerage System	March 20, 1996
312	Authorizing the National Centennial Commission to undertake fund-raising activities to finance its various projects and programs, amending for the purpose Executive Order No. 128, series of 1993	March 20, 1996
314	Establishing a National Maritime Safety Coordinating Council	March 28, 1996
313	Modifying the nomenclature and the rates of import duty on certain imported articles under Section 104 of the Tariff and Customs Code of 1978 (Presidential Decree No. 1464), as amended	March 29, 1996
315	Devolving to the Autonomous Regional Government of the Autonomous Region in Muslim Mindanao certain powers and functions of the Commission on Higher Education, the control and supervision over its programs in the region and for other purposes	March 30, 1996
316	Devolving certain powers and functions of the Cooperative Development Authority to the Autonomous Regional Government of the Autonomous Region in Muslim Mindanao	March 30, 1996
317	Devolving to the Autonomous Regional Government of the Autonomous Region in Muslim Mindanao certain powers and functions of the Technical Education and Skills Development Authority including the control and supervision over its offices, programs and projects in the region and for other purposes	March 30, 1996
319	Instituting the Moral Recovery Program (MRP) in all government departments, offices, agencies and government-owned and controlled corporations through the establishment of integrity circles	April 3, 1996
321	Creating a Presidential Commission for the Central Luzon Growth Corridor and for other purposes	April 9, 1996
322	Amending Executive Order No. 193, s. 1994	April 10, 1996
323	Providing for the participation of student volunteers in the activities of the Asia-Pacific Economic Cooperation (APEC) 1996 Meeting in the Philippines	April 10, 1996
324	Creating a review committee to study the integration into one department of all government agencies involved in corrections	April 12, 1996
325	Reorganization of the regional development councils [repealing Executive Order No. 308, series of 1987, as amended by Executive Order Nos. 318, (s. of 1988), 347 (s. of 1989), 366 (s. of 1989), 455 (s. of 1991) and 505 (s. 1992)]	April 12, 1996
301	Transferring the Kalinga Special Development Authority (KSDA) from the Department of National Defense (DND) to the Cordillera Executive Board-Cordillera Administrative Region (CEB-CAR) to effect its abolition	April 16, 1996
326	Providing for the suspension of the requirements of Executive Order No. 10 which mandates all government financial institutions to use income tax returns and financial statements duly filed with, and certified by the Bureau of Internal Revenue in evaluating the borrower's capacity to pay, provided that this suspension shall only be applicable to micro, cottage and small enterprises	April 17, 1996
327	Extending the term of the Central Visayas Water and Sanitation Project-Project Management Unit	April 17, 1996
328	Modifying the nomenclature and the rate of import duty on imported wheat for food under Section 104 of the Tariff and Customs Code of 1978 (Presidential Decree No. 1464), as amended	April 23, 1996
329	Designating the National Council of Women of the Philippines (NCWP) as one of the lead monitoring arm of non-governmental organizations (NGOs) for the effective implementation of the Global Platform for Action and the Philippine Plan for Gender-Responsive Development in the NGO and private sector	May 7, 1996
330	Adopting the Expanded Tertiary Education Equivalency and Accreditation Program as an integral part of the educational system and designating the Commission on Higher Education as the authority responsible for its implementation	May 10, 1996
320	Creating a special committee to take charge of the preparations for the centennial of the death anniversary of Marcelo H. del Pilar	May 14, 1996
331	Extending the coordinative and management role and function of the South Cotabato/Sarangani/General Santos City (Socsargen) Area Development Project Office	May 15, 1996
332	Integrating the barangay governments into the Revised Position Classification and Compensation System in the government	May 16, 1996
333	Modifying the rates of import duty on certain imported articles as provided under the Tariff and Customs Code of 1978, as amended, in order to implement the minimum 50% margin of preference on certain products included in the Brand-to-Brand Complementation Scheme in the automotive industry under the Basic Agreement on ASEAN Industrial Complementation	May 16, 1996
334	Amending Executive Order No. 79, series of 1993, entitled "Modifying the rates of import duty on certain imported articles as provided under the Tariff and Customs Code of 1978, as amended, in order to implement the minimum 50% margin of preference on certain products included in the Brand-to-Brand Complementation Scheme in the automotive industry under the Basic Agreement of ASEAN Industrial Complementation"	May 16, 1996
335	Modifying the rates of import duty on certain imported articles as provided under the Tariff and Customs Code of 1978, as amended, in order to implement the minimum 50% margin of preference on certain products included in the Brand-to-Brand Complementation Scheme in the automotive industry under the Basic Agreement on ASEAN Industrial Complementation	May 16, 1996
336	Modifying the rates of import duty on certain imported articles as provided under the Tariff and Customs Code of 1978, as amended, in order to implement the decision taken by the ASEAN Senior Economic Officials' Meeting to extend a minimum 50% margin of preference on certain products included in the Brand-to-Brand Complementation Scheme in the automotive industry under the Basic Agreement on ASEAN Industrial Complementation	May 16, 1996
299	Directing the National Amnesty Commission to conduct verification, processing, and determination of the list of RAM-SFP YOU members who are to be granted amnesty under Proclamation No. 723	May 17, 1996
337	Transferring the National Training Center for Technical Education and Staff Development (NTCTESD) and its administration from the Department of Education, Culture and Sports (DECS) to the Technical Education and Skills Development Authority (TESDA)	May 17, 1996
338	Directing the deposit of cash balances to the National Treasury	May 17, 1996
339	Amending Executive Order No. 167 dated 25 March 1994, creating the Iwahig Penal Colony Inter-Agency Study Committee	May 21, 1996
341	Creating the Presidential Fact-Finding Commission on Government Information Technology Projects	June 5, 1996
342	Providing for the creation of the Golf Course Construction and Development Committee in connection with the issuance of environmental compliance certificate for the construction development and operation of golf courses	June 6, 1996
343	Adopting the "Panunumpa ng Katapatan sa Watawat" as the official pledge of allegiance for all Filipinos	June 12, 1996
344	Transferring the Sacobia Development Authority and the jurisdiction over Sacobia to the Clark Development Corporation	June 14, 1996
345	Transferring the Board of Liquidators (BOL) from the National Development Company (NDC) to the Asset Privatization Trust (APT) to effect its abolition	June 14, 1996
346	Amending Executive Orders No. 728 and 938, redefining the organizational structure, functional thrusts and providing for the operational guidelines of the Commission on Filipinos Overseas	June 14, 1996
347	Declaring and delineating the Legazpi Port Zone under the administrative jurisdiction of the Philippine Ports Authority	June 18, 1996
348	Declaring and delineating the Masbate Port Zone under the administrative jurisdiction of the Philippine Ports Authority	June 18, 1996
349	Adopting the Mt. Makiling Reserve Area and Laguna de Bay Region Master Plan, providing for the implementation thereof and for other purposes	June 18, 1996
350	Directing the prominent display of the National Flag in all parks, buildings and establishments in preparation for the centennial of Philippine independence in 1998	June 25, 1996
353	Obligating and guaranteeing the Department of Foreign Affairs (DFA) loan with the Philippine National Bank and ordering the Secretary of Budget and Management to include in the DFA annual budget appropriation for the purchase of properties for CY 1997, 1998, 1999, 2000 and 2001 such amounts necessary to amortize and pay off said government loan	June 28, 1996
351	Creating a Siltation Steering Committee to manage a trust fund for siltation and erosion-related issues	June 29, 1996
352	Designation of statistical activities that will generate critical data for decision-making of the government and the private sector	July 1, 1996
354	Authorizing the National Power Corporation to enter into negotiated contracts for the coal supply requirements of its power stations as well as those of its independent power producers, and for other purposes	July 5, 1996
355	Reactivating the National Organizing Committee for the Fifth Asian and Pacific Ministerial Conference on Social Development	July 9, 1996
356	Amending Executive Order No. 203, "Creating the Oversight and Executive Committees for the National Government's Major Social Reform Agenda," and providing for the adoption of the guidelines on the institutional arrangement to fast-track SRA localization	July 12, 1996
357	Approving the allocation of a five percent share for local government units from the Lotto Charity Fund and providing the sharing scheme therefor	August 5, 1996
358	Creating a Presidential Commission for the restoration, conservation and preservation of the Vigan Heritage Village	August 12, 1996
359	Adjusting the dividend rates of selected government owned and/or controlled corporations on their 1995 net earnings pursuant to Section 5 of Republic Act No. 7656	August 16, 1996
360	Amending Executive Order No. 192, series of 1994, authorizing the establishment of the Clark International Airport Corporation to operate and manage the Clark Aviation Complex	August 16, 1996
362	Second Regular Foreign Investment Negative List	August 20, 1996
363	Providing for the guidelines on the allocation and release of the 1996 Poverty Alleviation Fund	August 23, 1996
364	Creating the National Commission on Savings	August 23, 1996
365	Providing for the tariff nomenclature and implementing the rates of import duties on certain imported articles under Republic Act Nos. 8180 and 8184	August 28, 1996
366	Further amending Executive Order No. 309, s. of 1987, entitled "Reorganizing the Peace and Order Council," as amended by Executive Order No. 317, s. of 1988, Executive Order No. 320, s. of 1988 and Executive Order No. 20, s. of 1992 and organizing the barangay peace and order committees as the implementing arm of the city/municipal peace and order council at the barangay level	September 5, 1996
367	Declaring and delineating the Jose Panganiban Port in Camarines Norte under the administrative jurisdiction of the Philippine Ports Authority	September 5, 1996
368	Amending Executive Order 356 dated 12 August 1996 which provides for the implementing guidelines on the institutional arrangements to fasttrack SRA localization, to include the National Council on the Role of the Filipino Women in the membership of the Social Reform Council	September 5, 1996
369	Creating the Social Protection Coordinating Committee to harmonize and coordinate social protection policies and programs	September 6, 1996
370	Strengthening the Philippine Council for Sustainable Development	September 26, 1996
371	Proclaiming a Special Zone of Peace and Development in the Southern Philippines and establishing therefor the Southern Philippines Council for Peace and Development and the Consultative Assembly	October 2, 1996
357-A	Amending Executive Order No. 357, series of 1996, which approved the allocation of a five percent share for local government units from the Lotto Charity Fund and providing the sharing scheme therefor	October 7, 1996
372	Creation of a coordinating task force for the establishment of the North Food Terminal Complex in Bulacan	October 9, 1996
373	Further amending Executive Order No. 175 dated 30 April 1994, as amended by EO 223, dated 7 February 1995, EO 229 dated 19 March 1995 and EO 259 dated 11 July 1995 which created a Northwestern Luzon Growth Quadrangle Commission	October 10, 1996
374	Creating a Presidential Task Force on Water Resources Development and Management	October 15, 1996
375	Creating a special committee to take charge of the preparations for the centennial of the birth anniversary of Geronima Tomelden Pecson	October 25, 1996
376	Authorizing the Department of Social Welfare and Development to establish, manage and operate a Skills Training Center for Disabled and Street Children at the Elsie Gaches Village	October 25, 1996
377	Providing the institutional framework for the administration of the deregulated local downstream oil industry	October 31, 1996
378	Declaring the period from November 15 to 30, 1996 as Special APEC - Philippines Consciousness Promotion Period and authorizing the conduct of special tourism related activities in the Subic Bay Freeport Zone in conjunction with the Asia-Pacific Economic Cooperation Conference	November 5, 1996
379	Appointing the Philippine Network of Small and Medium Enterprises (PhilSME) to manage the APEC Center for Technology Exchange and Training for SMEs (ACTETSME)	November 20, 1996
380	Creating the Industry Development Council, defining its composition, powers and functions	December 2, 1996
381	Creating an Executive Committee and Technical Working Group on Food Security	December 3, 1996
382	Establishing the Gawad Pamana ng Lahi	December 3, 1996
383	Reorganizing and strengthening the Tripartite Industrial Peace Council	December 6, 1996
384	Further amending Executive Order No. 325, series of 1996 and for this purpose institutionalizing labor sector representation in the regional development councils	December 7, 1996
385	Creating a task force to address the concerns of persons with disabilities	December 9, 1996
386	Amending certain provisions of Executive Order No. 369, dated September 6, 1996 which created the Social Protection Coordinating Committee to harmonize and coordinate social protection policies and programs	December 9, 1996
387	Further amending Executive Order No. 203, dated 27 September 1994, as amended by Executive Order No. 356, dated 12 July 1996	December 16, 1996
388	Modifying the nomenclature and rates of import duty on certain imported articles under Section 104 of the Tariff and Customs Code of 1978 (Presidential Decree No. 1464), as amended	December 27, 1996
389	Implementing the fourth and final year salary increases authorized by Joint Senate and House of Representatives Resolution No. 1, series of 1994	December 28, 1996

== 1997 ==
No.	Title	Date signed
390	Modifying the nomenclature and rates of import duty on certain imported articles under Section 104 of the Tariff and Customs Code of 1978 (Presidential Decree No. 1464), as amended	January 17, 1997
391	Creating an organizing committee to initiate and supervise appropriate commemorative activities for the 30th anniversary of the Association of Southeast Asian Nations (ASEAN)	January 20, 1997
392	Declaring full deregulation of the downstream oil industry	January 22, 1997
393	Establishing the Sajid Bulig Presidential Award for Heroism	January 22, 1997
394	Establishing the Lupong Tagapamayapa Incentives Awards	January 22, 1997
395	Approving and adopting the National Action Agenda for Productivity and creating the Philippine Council for Productivity	January 24, 1997
396	Providing the institutional framework for the administration of the standards of training, certification and watchkeeping for seafarers in the Philippines	January 30, 1997
397	Modifying the rates of duty on certain imported articles under the Tariff and Customs Code of 1978, as amended, in order to implement the minimum 50% margin of preference on certain products included in the Brand-to-Brand Complementation Scheme in the automotive industry under the Basic Agreement of ASEAN Industrial Complementation	January 31, 1997
398	Authorizing the National Food Authority to intervene in the stabilization of the price of sugar	January 31, 1997
399	Establishing the Presidential Mineral Industry Environmental Award	February 3, 1997
340	Directing national government agencies and government-owned and -controlled corporations to provide day care services for their employees' children under five years of age	February 5, 1997
400	Granting Career Service Officer rank to graduates of Master in Public Safety Administration of the Philippine Public Safety College and other related purposes	February 11, 1997
401	Amending Executive Order No. 359 entitled "Adjusting the dividend rates of selected government owned and/or controlled corporations on their 1995 net earnings pursuant to Section 5 of Republic Act No. 7656"	February 20, 1997
403	Adopting a Philippine Tourism Highway Program to further develop and promote the tourism potentials of the country and creating the Presidential Task Force thereof	February 28, 1997
406	Institutionalizing the Philippine Economic-Environmental and Natural Resources Accounting (PEENRA) System and creating units within the organizational structure of the Department of Environment and Natural Resources (DENR), National Economic and Development Authority (NEDA), and National Statistical Coordination Board (NSCB)	March 21, 1997
402	Creating a national organizing committee for the Philippine hosting of the Philippine International Garden Festival (Florikultura '98)	March 31, 1997
407	Providing for the guidelines on the allocation, release and management of the 1997 Poverty Alleviation Fund	April 4, 1997
409	Amending Section 2 of Executive Order No. 374 dated 15 October 1996 which established the Presidential Task Force on Water Resources Development and Management	April 15, 1997
410	Repealing Executive Order No. 212, series of 1994, in recognition of the power of the Philippine Ports Authority under P.D. No. 857 to implement the policy of accelerating the demonopolization and privatization of government ports in the country	May 1, 1997
411	Institutionalizing the President Ramon Magsaysay Outstanding Filipino Worker Award	May 1, 1997
412	Amending Executive Order No. 84, series of 1993, by reconstituting the composition of the Tagaytay-Taal Presidential Commission	May 6, 1997
413	Creating an inter-agency committee to oversee the turnover and development of properties in Makati held by the Philippine Development Alternatives Foundation, Inc. and Presidential Commission on Good Government to the national government and National Power Corporation	May 19, 1997
414	Authorizing the Department of Trade and Industry to oversee the progression of the plan for the establishment of the Asian Institute of Design and Technology (AIDT)	May 22, 1997
416	Declaring and delineating the San Jose (Occidental Mindoro) Port Zone under the administrative jurisdiction of the Philippine Ports Authority	June 4, 1997
417	Declaring and delineating the Basco Port Zone under the administrative jurisdiction of the Philippine Ports Authority	June 4, 1997
419	Declaring a moratorium on the establishment of duty-free stores/outlets in the Philippines	June 16, 1997
420	Modifying the rates of duty on sugar as provided for under the Tariff and Customs Code of 1978, as amended, in order to implement the ASEAN preferential rates of duty thereon	June 17, 1997
421	Further amending Executive Order No. 203 dated 27 September 1994, as amended by Executive Order No. 356, dated 12 July 1996	June 20, 1997
422	Creating the National Committee on the General Conference of the International Federation of Agricultural Producers in Manila, 27 May - 4 June 1998	June 25, 1997
423	Amendments to the guidelines on the entry and stay of foreign students in the Philippines and the establishment of an inter-agency committee for the purpose	June 25, 1997
405	Authorizing the Philippine Ports Authority (PPA) to reclaim and develop submerged areas vested in the PPA for port-related purposes	July 17, 1997
428	Creating the Multi-Sectoral Task Force on Maritime Development, defining its powers and functions and for other purposes	July 17, 1997
427	Modifying the nomenclature and rates of import duty of certain imported articles under Section 104 of the Tariff and Customs Code of 1978 (Presidential Decree No. 1464), as amended	July 21, 1997
426	Enhancing the Inter-Agency Committee Against Passport Irregularities (ICPI) to ensure the effective coordination among concerned agencies in the investigation, prosecution and disposition of cases involving passport irregularities	July 22, 1997
429	Amending Executive Order No. 62, series of 1993, which prescribed the policies and guidelines to implement Republic Act No. 7227	July 28, 1997
430	Further streamlining the Bureau of Internal Revenue in line with its Computerized Integrated Tax System	July 28, 1997
431	Providing for the creation of the National Coordinating Council for the Sugar Industry	August 5, 1997
433	Establishing the criteria for Presidential Citations to private business individuals and entities, foreign or local, in recognition of their exceptional contributions toward the attainment of Philippine economic and development goals	August 7, 1997
434	Amending Sections 2 and 4 of Executive Order No. 3 (dated 7 July 1992), as amended	August 20, 1997
435	Devolving to the Autonomous Regional Government of the Autonomous Region for Muslim Mindanao certain powers and functions of the Department of Transportation and Communications, its sectoral offices and attached agencies in the region, and for other purposes	August 28, 1997
436	Prescribing policy guidelines to govern the operations of cable television in the Philippines	September 9, 1997
437	Further amending Section 1, (par. f), of Executive Order No. 384, series of 1996, as amended, by including the regional directors of DOT as members of the regional development councils	September 15, 1997
438	Extending the effectivity of any charter or lease contract pursuant to Presidential Decree No. 760, as amended	September 15, 1997
439	Modifying the nomenclature and the rates of import duty of certain imported articles under Section 104 of the Tariff and Customs Code of 1978 (Presidential Decree 1464), as amended	September 15, 1997
440	Modifying the rates of duty of certain imported articles as provided under the Tariff and Customs Code of 1978, as amended, in order to implement the minimum 50% margin of preference on certain products included in the Brand-to-Brand Complementation Scheme in the automotive industry under the Basic Agreement on ASEAN Industrial Complementation	September 15, 1997
441	Confirming the role of the Department of Transportation and Communications as the primary planning, implementing and coordinating agency for all railway, port and airport projects	September 22, 1997
442	Creating the Agno River Basin Development Commission to oversee and coordinate all developmental activities along the Agno River Basin	September 23, 1997
443	Providing for the adoption of the Comprehensive and Integrated Delivery of Social Services as the national delivery mechanism for the Minimum Basic Needs (MBN) Approach	September 24, 1997
444	Amending Executive Order Nos. 250, 250-A s. 1995 and 419 s. 1997 implementing the rationalization of duty free stores/outlets and their operations in the Philippines pursuant to Executive Order No. 140 s. 1993 and for other purposes	September 26, 1997
446	Mandating the phase-out of leaded gasoline as one of the means of solving air pollution	September 26, 1997
445	Providing for the implementation of the SZOPAD Social Fund and the mechanism for the administration thereof	October 1, 1997
447	Further amending Executive Order No. 175, dated April 30, 1994, as amended by Executive Order No. 223, dated February 7, 1995, Executive Order No. 229, dated March 19, 1995, and Executive Order No. 259, dated July 11, 1995, which created the Northwestern Luzon Growth Quadrangle Commission	October 2, 1997
448	Establishing the Philippine Quality Award and creating the Philippine Quality Award Committee	October 3, 1997
449	Realigning the organization of the Bureau of Treasury	October 7, 1997
451	Creating the category of National Artist for Historical Literature	October 9, 1997
450	Ordering the dismantling of illegal fishpens and fishcages within the municipal waters of the Lingayen Gulf	October 17, 1997
452	Providing for the guidelines that will ensure the security of registered vendors in the workplace	October 24, 1997
453	Modifying the rates of duty on certain imported articles as provided for under the Tariff and Customs Code of 1978, as amended, in order to implement the 1997-2003 Philippine schedule of tariff reduction of products transferred from the temporary exclusion list to the inclusion list under the new time frame for the Accelerated Common Effective Preferential Tariff Scheme for the ASEAN Free Trade Area (CEPT-AFTA)	October 31, 1997
454	Implementing austerity measures in government for 1997	October 31, 1997
455		November 11, 1997
456	Amending further Executive Order No. 167 dated 25 March 1994 as amended by Executive Order No. 339 dated 21 May 1997 creating the Iwahig Penal Colony Inter-Agency Committee	November 11, 1997
457	Amending Executive Orders No. 63 and 64, s. of 1993	November 13, 1997
458	Authorizing the grant of special allowance for fiscal year 1997 to all officials and employees of the national government, government-owned and controlled corporations and government financial institutions	November 17, 1997
459	Providing for the guidelines in the negotiation of international agreements and its ratification	November 25, 1997
460	Reactivating the jurisdiction and authority of the Special Committee on Naturalization to consider and evaluate petitions for naturalization of deserving aliens and to recommend action thereon to the President of the Philippines	December 3, 1997
462	Enabling private sector participation in the exploration, development, utilization and commercialization of ocean, solar and wind energy resources for power generation and other energy uses	December 29, 1997
461	Providing for the tariff nomenclature and implementing the rates of import duties on certain imported articles under Section 401 of the Tariff and Customs Code of 1978 (Presidential Decree 1464), as amended	December 31, 1997

== 1998 ==
No.	Title	Date signed
464	Governing the admission and stay of foreign nationals in the Clark Special Economic Zone as temporary visitors	January 6, 1998
463	Creating the Management Information System and Technology Group in line with the computerization program of the Bureau of Customs	January 9, 1998
465	Modifying the nomenclature and the rates of import duty of certain imported articles under Section 104 of the Tariff and Customs Code of 1978 (Presidential Decree 1464 as amended)	January 13, 1998
464	Governing the admission and stay of foreign nationals in the Clark Special Economic Zone as temporary visitors	January 26, 1998
468	Providing for the creation of a national council for the promotion of electronic commerce in the country	February 23, 1998
469	Amending Executive Order No. 190 dated 19 July 1994 approving and adopting the National Information Technology Plan 2000 and establishing the National Information Technology Council	February 23, 1998
470	Creating the Philippine Council for Mental Health	February 24, 1998
471	Declaring full deregulation of the downstream oil industry	March 14, 1998
467	Providing for a national policy on the operation and use of international satellite communications in the country	March 17, 1998
474	Establishing the coordination and management mechanism for the preparation and implementation of the Mindanao Rural Development Program	March 24, 1998
472	Institutionalizing the Committee on Fuel Conservation and Efficiency in Road Transport	March 25, 1998
475	Transferring the Philippine Coast Guard from the Department of National Defense to the Office of the President, and for other purposes	March 30, 1998
476	Further amending Executive Order No. 169, series of 1994 by modifying the representations of DOF and DBM to the Central Bank - Board of Liquidators	March 31, 1998
477	Transferring the Philippine Coast Guard to the Department of Transportation and Communications	April 15, 1998
473	Providing for the segregation and unbundling of electrical power tariff components of the National Power Corporation and the franchised electric utilities	April 17, 1998
480	Amending Executive Order No. 380 dated 2 December 1996, "Creating the Industry Development Council, defining its composition, powers and functions"	April 27, 1998
481	Directing the use, disposition, and administration of the Coco Levy Funds to rehabilitate the coconut industry	May 1, 1998
482	Amending Executive Order No. 460 by deleting some portions from the title and from Sections 1 and 4 thereof, and by adding one more section thereto	May 7, 1998
478	Increasing the minimum access volume (MAV) for coffee beans under the Agricultural Tariffication Act	May 22, 1998
479	Amending Executive Order No. 249 dated May 29, 1995 granting permanent resident status to certain Vietnamese citizens and Filipino-Vietnamese children	May 31, 1998
483	Adjusting the dividend rates of selected government owned and/or controlled corporations on their 1997 net earnings pursuant to Section 5 of Republic Act No. 7656	June 2, 1998
484	Approving and adopting the Medium Term Youth Development Plan: 1999-2004 and creating a monitoring committee to oversee its implementation	June 8, 1998
485	Establishing the Youth Entrepreneurship Program and creating the National Cooperators Council, providing for its functions and for other purposes	June 9, 1998
486	Modifying the nomenclature and the rates of import duty of certain imported articles under Section 104 of the Tariff and Customs Code of 1978 (Presidential Decree 1464 as amended)	June 11, 1998
487	Modifying the rates of duty on certain imported articles as provided for under the Tariff and Customs Code of 1978, as amended, in order to implement the 1998-2003 Philippine schedule of tariff reductions of products transferred from the temporary exclusion list to the inclusion list under the new time frame of the Accelerated Common Effective Preferential Tariff Scheme for the ASEAN Free Trade Area (CEPT-AFTA)	June 11, 1998
488	Repealing Annex "B" of Executive Order No. 453 series of 1997 and implementing the ASEAN rates of duty of certain imported articles as provided for under the Tariff and Customs Code of 1978, as amended	June 11, 1998
