= Ronnie Henares =

Filipino actor, musician, and producer (born 1955)

- Born: February 8, 1955 (age 71)
- Occupations: Actor; producer; talent manager; musician; comedian
- Years active: 1973–present
- Known for: Tommy Diones in Pepito Manaloto
- Relatives: Rhian Ramos (wife's niece); Atom Henares (brother); Kim Henares (sister-in-law)
- Musical career
- Instruments: Vocals; guitar

Ronnie Henares (born February 8, 1955) is a Filipino actor, television host, producer, talent manager, and musician known for his work in Philippine entertainment. He first gained attention in the 1970s as part of the musical duo The Two of Us alongside Jojit Paredes. Henares later worked as an executive producer, television host, stage performer, and film actor, appearing in productions by directors such as Lino Brocka and Maryo J. de los Reyes.

He later became widely recognized for portraying Tommy Diones in the sitcom Pepito Manaloto (2010–present) alongside Michael V.. Beyond acting, Henares is a member of the band Midlife Crisis and co-owns Primeline Management and Productions, a talent agency that has managed several Filipino performers.

== Early life ==
Henares was born on February 8, 1955 to economist and TV-radio personality Hilarion "Larry" Henares Jr. and Cecilia Roensch Lichauco.

== Career ==
Henares and Jojit Paredes were schoolmates at La Salle grade school before forming the singing duo The Two of Us. Managed by Ronnie's younger brother, Atom, the duo became known through television appearances and campus tours during the 1970s. During the same period, they were often associated with the Apo Hiking Society, which included Jim Paredes. Later, Jojit left the entertainment industry, moved to Los Angeles, married an American, and worked in hospital administration. Henares continued working in show business and remained active in the entertainment industry, including during the time he was linked to Vilma Santos.

Henares later joined Penthouse 7 as an executive producer and dancer, where he worked with Ida Ramos, who eventually became his wife. He also hosted several television variety shows in Broadcast City and participated in stage productions, including West Side Story with June Keithley at St. Paul College. Henares also appeared in films directed by Lino Brocka and Maryo J. de los Reyes. Later, he became known for his comedic role as Tommy Diones in the sitcom Pepito Manaloto (2010–present) alongside Michael V.. The program also featured topics related to health and public awareness, including stroke prevention, healthy living, and organ donation. Henares' performance in the sitcom was recognized for effectively combining comedy with informative content.

Henares is a member of the band Midlife Crisis in the Philippines, where its repertoire consists of music from the '70s and '90s. Henares and his wife own Primeline Management and Productions, inc., the talent agency that managed artists such as Regine Velasquez, Lani Misalucha, Nanette Inventor, and 4th Impact.

== Personal life ==
Henares is married to Ida Ramos, a former cast member of Penthouse 7 (1974–1981) who also served as a head of the GMA Artist Center (now Sparkle). He was previously married to Merce Catibayan with whom he has two children.

Through one of his siblings' marriages, he is the brother-in law of former Bureau of Internal Revenue commissioner Kim Henares.

== Filmography ==
=== Television ===
Year	Title	Role	Ref.
1973–1979	Broadcast Campus	Host	
2010–present	Pepito Manaloto	Tomas "Tommy" Diones	
2011	Time of My Life	Vernon	
2012	Coffee Prince	Oliver Ocgolhoa	
2013	Forever	Jaime Del Prado	
2013	Genesis	Emil Trinidad	
2017	Destined to be Yours	Dante Eacobar	
2018	The Cure	Eduardo	
2018–2019	Cain at Abel	Gener Buenaventura	
2020	Descendants of the Sun	Ed	

=== Film ===
Year	Title	Role	Ref..
1975	Darna vs. the Planet Women		
2019	Metamorphosis	Filipino priest 1	
2024	Itutumba Ka ng Tatay Ko		
