= Kim Henares =

Filipino lawyer, accountant, and government official

Kim Jacinto-Henares
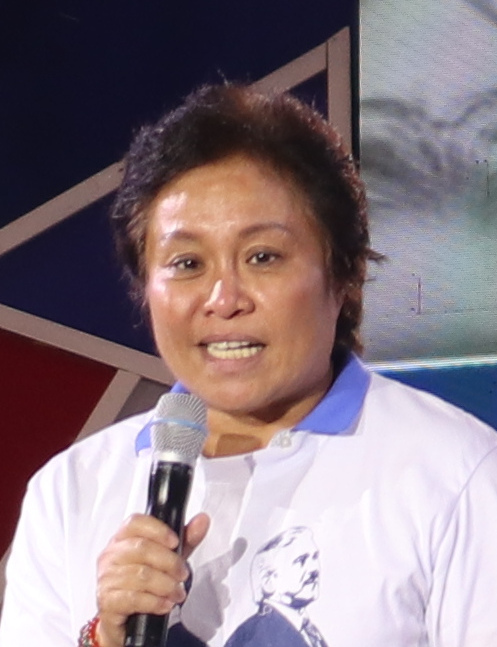
- Henares in 2022

Commissioner of the Bureau of Internal Revenue
- In office July 1, 2010 – June 30, 2016
- President: Benigno Aquino III
- Preceded by: Joel Tan-Torres
- Succeeded by: Caesar Dulay

Personal details
- Born: Kim S. Jacinto; August 5, 1960 (age 66) Philippines
- Education: Ateneo de Manila University (B.A., LL.B.) University of New South Wales (M.B.A.)
- Occupation: Lawyer, Public Servant
- Profession: Lawyer, Accountant

Kim S. Jacinto-Henares (born August 5, 1960) is a Filipino lawyer, accountant, and government official. She previously served as the Commissioner of the Bureau of Internal Revenue (BIR) from 2010 to 2016 during the administration of former President Benigno Aquino III.

== Career ==
Jacinto-Henares has been appointed as the Director of Basic Energy Corporation since December 2024. She also served as director of Reg Tek, Inc. and a Senior International Advisor/Consultant to groups including the Albright Stonebridge Group.

In June 2012, Henares was nominated for the position of Chief Justice of the Supreme Court following the impeachment of Renato Corona, although she did not pursue the appointment.

She is a board member of the Tribute Foundation for International Tax Dispute Resolution in The Hague, Netherlands, and a commissioner of the Independent Commission for Reform of International Corporate Taxation. She has served as a member of the UN ESCAP Eminent Expert Group on Tax Policy and Public Expenditure Management (Bangkok, Thailand) and the UN Committee on Experts on International Cooperation in Tax Matters (Geneva, Switzerland).

From 2010 to 2016, Jacinto-Henares was appointed Commissioner of the Bureau of Internal Revenue by then-president Benigno Aquino III. She had previously been Deputy Commissioner for the Special Concerns Group of the Bureau from 2003 to 2005. Before joining the BIR, she also served as Governor of the Board of Investment.

She was vice chairperson of the Ad Hoc Group for Action 15 (Multilateral Instrument to Implement Tax Treaty Related Measures to Tackle BEPS) in Paris, France. In the private sector, she worked with ING Bank N.V. Manila Branch as Vice President and as Deputy to the Vice Chairman of Security Bank Corporation. Earlier in her career, she was Senior Associate at Romulo, Mabanta, Buenaventura, Sayoc & De los Angeles Law Offices, and a tax lawyer at SyCip, Gorres, Velayo & Co. She was also General Manager of St. J. Square Marketing Corporation, and an accounting lecturer at De La Salle University Manila.

In 2025, Kim Jacinto-Henares submitted her application to the Judicial and Bar Council (JBC) for the position of Ombudsman of the Philippines vying to replace Ombudsman Samuel Martires.

== Education ==
Jacinto-Henares earned a Bachelor of Science in Commerce, major in Accounting, at De La Salle University and a Bachelor of Laws at Ateneo de Manila University, graduating with honors. She later obtained a Master of Laws in International and Comparative Law at Georgetown University in Washington, D.C. She also attended the University of New Brunswick, McGill University Faculty of Law, and the University of Toronto Faculty of Law in fulfillment of requirements for the Joint Accreditation Committee.

She completed a Postgraduate Diploma in International Dispute Resolution at Queen Mary University of London.

== Personal life ==
She is married to Daniel Henares, son of economist and TV-radio personality Larry Henares Jr. Through her marriage, she is the brother-in-law of actor Ronnie Henares.

== Awards ==
Jacinto-Henares has received the Civil Service Commission's Lingkod Bayan Award and the Order of Lakandula (Bayani) for her service as a government accountant and lawyer.
