= Taxation in the Philippines =

The policy of taxation in the Philippines is governed chiefly by the Constitution of the Philippines and three Republic Acts.

- Constitution: Article VI, Section 28 of the Constitution states that "the rule of taxation shall be uniform and equitable" and that "Congress shall evolve a progressive system of taxation".
- National law: National Internal Revenue Code—enacted as Republic Act No. 8424 or the Tax Reform Act of 1997 and subsequent laws amending it; the law was most recently amended by Republic Act No. 10963 or the Tax Reform for Acceleration and Inclusion Law; and,
- Local laws: major sources of revenue for the local government units (LGUs) are the taxes collected by virtue of Republic Act No. 7160 or the Local Government Code of 1991, and those sourced from the proceeds collected by virtue of a local ordinance.

Taxes imposed at the national level are collected by the Bureau of Internal Revenue (BIR), while those imposed at the local level (i.e., provincial, city, municipal, barangay) are collected by a local treasurer's office.

== Taxation laws ==
- National Internal Revenue Code (Commonwealth Act No. 466)
- National Internal Revenue Code of 1977 (Presidential Decree No. 1158)
- National Internal Revenue Code of 1997 (Republic Act No. 8424)

== History ==
During the 17th and 18th centuries, the Governor-General led the central and local government in the Philippines. The financial system was managed by an Intendant General, with the Chief Royal Accountant (Contador de Resultas) assisting him. The Contador's decisions were final unless changed by the Council of the Indies. Tax collection was carried out by local officials: governadorcillos, alcaldes, and cabezas de barangay.

The first internal revenue law (Philippine Commission Act No. 1189) in the Philippines was modeled after the US system. It was approved on July 2, 1904 by the Philippine Commission, and became effective on August 4, 1904. Further laws were passed in 1913, 1916, and 1917. The National Internal Revenue Code (NIRC) was established as Commonwealth Act No. 466 on June 15, 1939, effective from July 1, 1939. This Code saw several amendments over the years such as the Omnibus Tax Law in 1969 (RA 6110) NIRCs of 1977 and 1986, and other presidential decrees and executive orders such as Presidential Decree No. 69 in 1972.

Republic Act No. 8424, also known as the "Tax Reform Act of 1997," was enacted on July 28, 1997. RA 8424 instituted the NIRC of 1997, which is currently the foundational law of taxation in the Philippines. The code was notably amended especially during the presidency of Rodrigo Duterte. The TRAIN Law (RA 10963) was signed into law in December 2017 and effective in January 2018. It made major amendments to personal income tax brackets and rates, as well as updated tax rules for self-employed individuals and professionals. Major amendments to corporate tax rates and incentives are also made through the Corporate Recovery and Tax Incentives for Enterprises (CREATE) Act or RA 11534, signed in March 2021 and effective on April 11, 2021. Both the TRAIN Law and the CREATE Law were part of the Duterte administration's Comprehensive Tax Reform Program (CTRP).

== National taxes ==
The taxes imposed by the national government of the Philippines include, but are not limited to:

- income tax;
- estate tax;
- donor's tax;
- value-added tax;
- percentage tax;
- excise tax; and
- documentary stamp tax.

=== Income tax ===
==== Income tax for individuals ====
Citizens of the Philippines and resident aliens must pay taxes for all income they have derived from various sources, which include, but are not limited to:

- compensation income (e.g., salary and wages);
- income of self-employed individuals and/or professionals;
- capital gains;
- interests;
- rents;
- royalties;
- dividends;
- annuities;
- prizes and winnings;
- pensions; and,
- partner's share from the profits of partnership.

===== Compensation and self-employment income =====
Individuals, including nonresident aliens, earning compensation income are taxed based only on the income tax schedule for individuals. On the other hand, self-employed individuals and professionals are taxed based on the income tax schedule for individuals, applicable percentage taxes, and value-added tax (VAT). However, if their gross sales (or gross receipts plus other non-operating income) does not exceed the VAT threshold, they have the option to be taxed either on the basis of the income tax schedule for individuals and the applicable percentage taxes, or just with a flat tax rate of 8% on their gross sales (or gross receipts plus other non-operating income).

Income tax schedule for individuals effective FY 2023 and onwards
Annual taxable income		Tax to pay
Over	But not over	Tax to pay
₱0	₱250,000	0%
₱250,000	₱400,000	15% of the excess over ₱250,000
₱400,000	₱800,000	₱22,500 + 20% of the excess over ₱400,000
₱800,000	₱2,000,000	₱102,500 + 25% of the excess over ₱800,000
₱2,000,000	₱8,000,000	₱402,500 + 30% of the excess over ₱2,000,000
₱8,000,000		₱2,202,500 + 35% of the excess over ₱8,000,000

Income tax schedule for individuals effective FY 2018 until FY 2022
Annual taxable income		Tax to pay
Over	But not over	Tax to pay
₱0	₱250,000	0%
₱250,000	₱400,000	20% of the excess over ₱250,000
₱400,000	₱800,000	₱30,000 + 25% of the excess over ₱400,000
₱800,000	₱2,000,000	₱130,000 + 30% of the excess over ₱800,000
₱2,000,000	₱8,000,000	₱490,000 + 32% of the excess over ₱2,000,000
₱8,000,000		₱2,410,000 + 35% of the excess over ₱8,000,000

===== Interests, royalties, prizes and other winnings =====
Interest income from bank deposits, deposit substitutes, trust funds, and other similar products (except for its long-term variants) is taxed at the rate of 20%.

Royalties, except on books, literary works and musical compositions, are taxed at the rate of 10%.

Prizes and winnings from Philippine Charity Sweepstakes Office (PCSO) Lotto in excess of ₱10,000 (upon which individual prizes and winnings ₱10,000 or below are taxed on the basis of the income tax schedule for individuals) are taxed at the rate of 20%.

Interest income from a depository bank under the expanded foreign currency deposit system is taxed at the rate of 15%.

Income from long-term deposits and investments, when pre-terminated in less than three years after making such deposit or investment, is taxed at the rate of 20%; less than four years, 12%; and, less than five years, 5%.

===== Dividends =====
Cash and property dividends are taxed at the rate of 10%.

===== Capital gains =====
Capital gains from the sale of shares of stock not traded in stock exchange are taxed at the rate of 15%.

Capital gains from the sale of real property are taxed at the rate of 6%, except when such proceeds would be used to construct a new principal residence within eighteen months after the sale of a previous principal residence had occurred.

==== Income tax for corporations ====
With the introduction of Republic Act No. 11534 also known as the CREATE Act, since July 1, 2020 the rate of corporate income tax has been reduced from 30% to 25% for domestic corporations, or 20% if the corporation's net taxable income for the year does not exceed ₱5 million and their total assets do not exceed ₱100 million (excluding land where the business entity's office, plant, and equipment are situated). The rate of minimum corporate income tax for domestic and resident foreign corporations was reduced to 1% that took place between July 1, 2020 and June 30, 2023, after which it has since been reverted to 2% based on the gross income of the corporations; while the rate of regular corporate income tax for non-profit proprietary educational institutions and hospitals was reduced to 1% during this period, after which it has since been reverted to 10%.

=== Estate tax ===
The transfer of the net estate is taxed at a flat rate of 6%. There is a standard deduction amounting to ₱5,000,000.

=== Donor's tax ===
The total value of gifts made in a calendar year shall be taxed at a flat rate of 6%. There is a standard deduction amounting to ₱250,000.

=== Value-added tax ===
The standard value-added tax (VAT) rate since 2006 is 12%, when Republic Act No. 9337 came into effect; previously, it had been 10% when it was first introduced by president Corazon Aquino in 1988 upon issuing Executive Order No. 273.

In 2018, the VAT threshold of annual sales was changed from ₱1,919,500 to ₱3,000,000 as a result of the passage of the Tax Reform for Inclusion and Acceleration (TRAIN) Law.

==== Exempt transactions ====
The following goods, services and transactions are exempted from the VAT:

- agricultural and marine food products in their original state;
- fertilizers, seeds, seedlings, fingerlings, and feeds and feed ingredients;
- importation of personal and household effects of persons resettling in the Philippines;
- importation of professional instruments, wearing apparel, and domestic animals;
- services subject to percentage tax;
- agricultural contract growers and millers;
- health care services;
- educational services;
- agricultural cooperatives, and cooperatives that are non-agricultural and non-electric in nature;
- residential lots worth at most ₱1,500,000, or house and lots worth at most ₱2,500,000
- monthly lease of residential units at most ₱15,000;
- books and mass media publications (e.g. newspaper and magazine);
- transport services by non-Philippine carriers;
- cargo vessels and aircraft;
- financial services;
- sales to senior citizens and persons with disability;
- from 2019, drugs prescribed for diabetes, high cholesterol and hypertension; and,
- annual sales of any other goods or services not exceeding ₱3,000,000.

=== Percentage tax ===
Percentage tax is a business tax imposed on persons or entities/transactions:

- who sell or lease goods, properties or services in the course of trade or business and are exempt from value-added tax (VAT) under Section 109 (w) of the National Internal Revenue Code, as amended, whose gross annual sales and/or receipts do not exceed Php 3,000,000 and who are not VAT-registered; and,
- engaged in businesses specified in Title V of the National Internal Revenue Code.

=== Excise taxes ===
Excise taxes apply to goods manufactured or produced in the Philippines for domestic sales or consumption or for any other disposition and to things imported.

== Local taxes ==
=== Real property tax ===
One of main sources of revenues of the local government units is the real property tax, which is a tax imposed on all types of real properties including lands, buildings, improvements, and machinery.

==== Real Property Valuation and Assessment Reform Act ====
On June 13, 2024, Marcos, Jr. signed into law, R.A. 12001, the 'Real Property Valuation and Assessment Reform Act', part of Legislative-Executive Development Advisory Council and his 8-Point Socioeconomic Agenda. “It adopts the prevailing market value as the single real property valuation base and creates a Real Property Information System—a comprehensive, digitalized real property tax administration,” he explained.
