= Expo 2002 (Quezon City, Philippines) =

Planned world fair

Expo 2002 was a planned world's fair intended to take place in Quezon City, a part of Metro Manila, the National Capital Region of the Philippines between January and April 2002. When this was canceled in January 1999, the responsibility for hosting Expo 2002 was briefly transferred to Gold Coast, Queensland, Australia, before this alternative plan was also canceled.

== History ==
=== Planning ===
Planning for the exposition in the Philippines began in 1993, promoted by the private-sector World Expo 2002 Philippines Foundation and led by Mina Gabor, who had recently headed the Philippines pavilion at Seville Expo '92. Philippine president Fidel V. Ramos issued an executive order on May 16, 1994, establishing the World Expo 2002 Philippines Commission to plan the fair. Ramos appointed Gabor as his Secretary of Tourism in 1996.

=== Bidding and awarding ===
The theme of the Expo was to be "Ecotourism: Growing with Nature". The fairgrounds would have been located in the Quezon Memorial Circle and the adjoining Ninoy Aquino Parks and Wildlife Center, and the exposition would have run from January to April 2002.

The Philippine proposal competed with a rival bid from Australia, which offered to host an interactive technology-themed Expo in Coomera, Queensland. The Australian plan was headed by Llew Edwards, who had served as CEO of the successful World Expo 88 in nearby Brisbane. Both candidates bid to the Bureau International des Expositions (BIE), the international organization responsible for regulating world's fairs, which chose between them at its General Assembly in Paris on June 5, 1998. On the first ballot, the two bids were tied. When a second ballot was held, the Philippines won by a margin of four votes over Australia, out of an available total of 84 votes.

The awarding of the Expo to Manila coincided with the Philippine Centennial, occurring seven days before the 100th anniversary of the Philippine Declaration of Independence. It also coincided with the Philippine Centennial International Exposition, or "Expo Pilipino", a similar event to the planned Expo 2002 on a smaller scale which was then ongoing in nearby Clark. Expo Pilipino suffered financial losses and its leaders were accused of corruption, tarnishing the reputation of President Ramos, whose term ended on June 30, 1998. The new president, Joseph Estrada, reportedly had a dispute with Gabor, whose term as Secretary of Tourism ended when Estrada took office.

=== Cancellation ===
On December 22, 1998, President Estrada signed an executive order abolishing the World Expo 2002 Philippines Commission, writing that "the Philippine Government, due to its present fiscal constraints is unable to provide budgetary support" and asking the private sector to assume the responsibility of organizing the Expo. Local businesses also lost interest in supporting the Expo, in part because of the government disputes.

Expo 2002 in the Philippines was officially canceled on January 20, 1999. In Queensland, which had narrowly lost the Expo to Manila seven months before, interest was promptly revived in hosting the event. By January 24, the BIE had officially awarded Expo 2002 to the city of Gold Coast. However, the planned site in Coomera was no longer available for use as the fairgrounds, and the organizers had planned their initial proposal around a 35-month construction schedule. The BIE denied their request to postpone the Expo to 2003 to allow more time to prepare. As a result, Queensland premier Peter Beattie announced on January 28 that the state was backing out of organizing the fair and would pursue a bid for an Expo 2007 instead.
