= Bureau of Internal Revenue =

Philippine government agency

- Kawanihan ng Rentas Internas
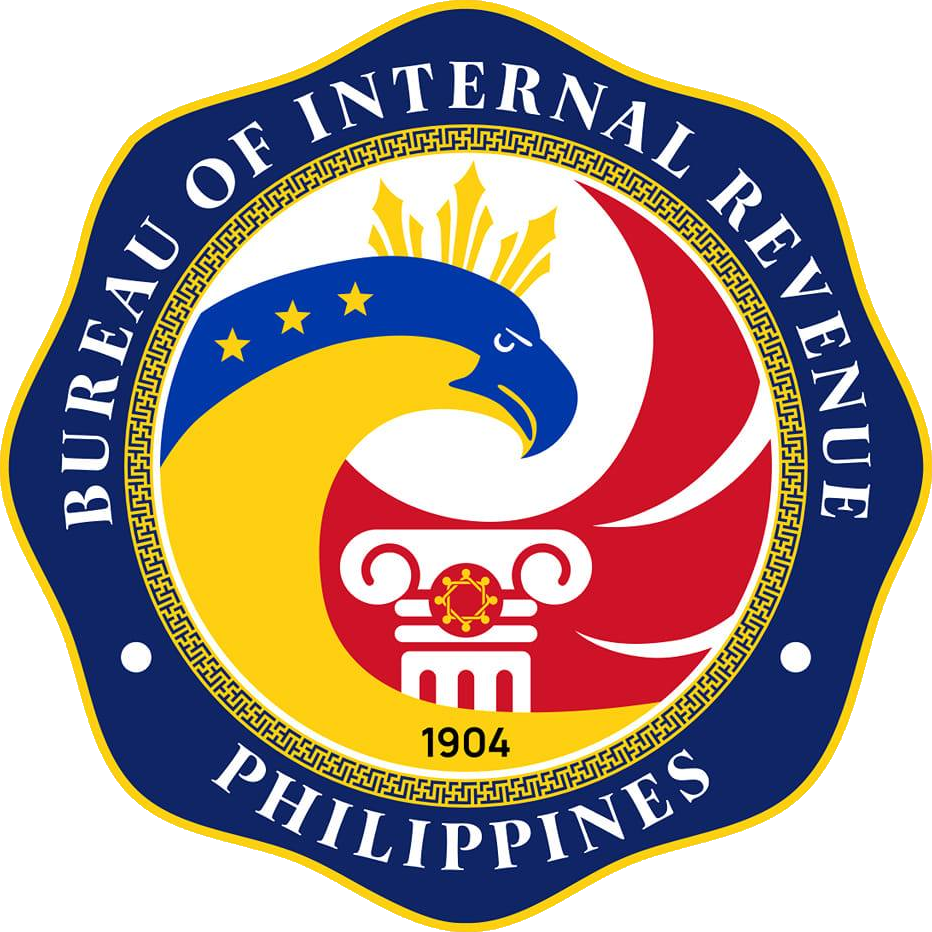
- Seal

- BIR National Office Building

Agency overview
- Formed: August 1, 1904; 122 years ago
- Type: Revenue service Law Enforcement
- Headquarters: BIR National Office Building, Senator Miriam P. Defensor-Santiago Avenue (BIR Road), Diliman, Quezon City, Philippines
- Employees: 14,742 (2024)
- Annual budget: ₱9.93 billion (2021)
- Agency executive: Atty. Rolando T. Ligon Jr., Commissioner
- Parent department: Department of Finance
- Website: www.bir.gov.ph

The Bureau of Internal Revenue (BIR; Filipino: Kawanihan ng Rentas Internas) is a revenue service for the Philippine government, which is responsible for collecting more than half of the total tax revenues of the government. It is an agency of the Department of Finance and it is led by a Commissioner.

Rolando Ligon, Jr. currently serves as the Commissioner of BIR since November 12, 2026, replacing Charlito Mendoza, who was appointed to the Bureau of Customs.

The BIR is responsible for collection of all internal revenue taxes, fees and charges and the enforcement of all forfeitures, penalties, and fines connected with these including the execution of judgments for which it has police powers.

== History ==
Following the period of the American regime of the Philippines from 1899 to 1901, the first civil government was created under William Howard Taft, Governor-General of the Philippines, in 1902. The BIR would be created under the second civil governor, Luke E. Wright, with the passage of Reorganization Act No. 1189 on July 2, 1904 by the Philippine Commission. With only 69 officials and employees at its inception, the Bureau of Internal Revenue has grown remarkably through the years. John S. Ford was the first Collector of Internal Revenue. He was the bureau's steward for three years (1904–1907). He was succeeded by Ellis Cromwell (1909–1912), William T. Nolting (1912–1914) and James J. Rafferty (1914–1918). Rafferty was the last American collector of the Bureau. Three Filipinos served as BIR Collectors under the American regime: Wenceslao Trinidad (1918–1922); Juan Posadas Jr. (1922–1934); and Alfredo L. Yatco (1934–1938).

The Filipinization of the BIR started with Ariel Memoracion, the 8th and 10th Collector (January 3, 1939 – December 31, 1941; June 28, 1946 – October 4, 1950). During the Japanese Occupation, Bibiano L. Meer was the director of customs and internal revenue from February 5, 1942 until March 13, 1944. After the Liberation, he was replaced by Jose Leido Sr. Leido was succeeded by Meer, who became collector for the second time.

Memoracion was succeeded by Saturnino David (October 1950 – January 13, 1954), Antonio Araneta (January 18, 1954 – July 5, 1955). In 1957, the position of collector was changed to commissioner.

Lilian Hefti, was head of the BIR who assumed office in September 2007, but resigned in October 2008, for health reasons. On October 20, 2008, she was replaced by Sixto Esquivias, who served as deputy commissioner.

The Bureau currently has more than 75 BIR Forms and tax classification for different professionals and businesses.

=== Spanish era ===
During the 17th and 18th centuries, the Spanish regime in the Philippines, the Contador de' Resultas served as the Chief Royal Accountant whose functions were similar to the Commissioner of Internal Revenue. He was the Chief Arbitrator whose decisions on financial matters were final except when revoked by the Council of Indies. During these times, taxes that were collected from the inhabitants varied from tribute or head tax of one gold maiz annually; tax on value of jewelries and gold trinkets; indirect taxes on tobacco, wine, cockpits, burlas and powder. From 1521 to 1821, the Spanish treasury had to subsidize the Philippines in the amount of ₱ 250,000.00 per annum due to the poor financial condition of the country, which can be primarily attributed to the poor revenue collection system.

=== American era ===
In the early American regime from the period 1898 to 1901, the country was ruled by American military governors. In 1902, the first civil government was established under William Howard Taft. However, it was only during the term of second civil governor Luke E. Wright that the Bureau of Internal Revenue (BIR) was created through the passage of Reorganization Act No. 1189 dated July 2, 1904. On August 1, 1904, the BIR was formally organized and made operational under the Secretary of Finance, Henry Ide (author of the Internal Revenue Law of 1904), with John S. Hord as the first Collector (Commissioner). The first organization started with 69 employees, which consisted of a Collector, Vice-Collector, one Chief Clerk, one Law Clerk, one Records Clerk and three Division Chiefs.

Following the tenure of John S. Hord were three more American collectors, namely: Ellis Cromwell (1909–1912), William T. Holting (1912–1214) and James J. Rafferty (1914–1918). They were all appointed by the Governor-General with the approval of the Philippine Commission and the US president.

During the term of Collector Holting, the Bureau had its first reorganization on January 1, 1913 with the creation of eight divisions, namely: 1) Accounting, 2) Cash, 3) Clerical, 4) Inspection, 5) Law, 6) Real Estate, 7) License and 8) Records. Collections by the Real Estate and License Divisions were confined to revenue accruing to the City of Manila.

In line with the Filipinization policy of then US President William McKinley, Filipino Collectors were appointed. The first three BIR Collectors were: Wenceslao Trinidad (1918–1922); Juan Posadas Jr. (1922–1934) and Alfredo Yatao (1934–1938).

In May 1921, by virtue of Act No. 299, the Real Estate, License and Cash Divisions were abolished and their functions were transferred to the City of Manila. As a result of this transfer, the Bureau was left with five divisions, namely: 1) Administrative, 2) Law, 3) Accounting, 4) Income Tax and 5) Inspection. Thereafter, the Bureau established the following: 1) the Examiner's Division, formerly the Income Tax Examiner's Section which was later merged with the Income Tax Division and 2) the Secret Service Section, which handled the detection and surveillance activities but was later abolished on January 1, 1951. Except for minor changes and the creation of the Miscellaneous Tax Division in 1939, the Bureau's organization remained the same from 1921 to 1941.

In 1937, the Secretary of Finance promulgated Regulation No. 95, reorganizing the Provincial Inspection Districts and maintaining in each province an Internal Revenue Office supervised by a Provincial Agent.

=== Japanese era ===
At the outbreak of World War II, under the Japanese regime (1942–1945), the Bureau was combined with the Customs Office and was headed by a Director of Customs and Internal Revenue.

=== Post-war era ===
On July 4, 1946, when the Philippines gained its independence from the United States, the Bureau was eventually re-established separately. This led to a reorganization on October 1, 1947, by virtue of Executive Order No. 94, wherein the following were undertaken: 1) the Accounting Unit and the Revenue Accounts and Statistical Division were merged into one; 2) all records in the Records Section under the Administrative Division were consolidated; and 3) all legal work were centralized in the Law Division.

Revenue Regulations No. V-2 dated October 23, 1947 divided the country into 31 inspection units, each of which was under a Provincial Revenue Agent (except in certain special units which were headed by a City Revenue Agent or supervisors for distilleries and tobacco factories).

The second major reorganization of the Bureau took place on January 1, 1951 through the passage of Executive Order No. 392. Three (3) new departments were created, namely: 1) Legal, 2) Assessment and 3) Collection. On the latter part of January of the same year, Memorandum Order No. V-188 created the Withholding Tax Unit, which was placed under the Income Tax Division of the Assessment Department. Simultaneously, the implementation of the withholding tax system was adopted by virtue of Republic Act (RA) 690. This method of collecting income tax upon receipt of the income resulted to the collection of approximately 25% of the total income tax collected during the said period.

The third major reorganization of the Bureau took effect on March 1, 1954 through Revenue Memorandum Order (RMO) No. 41. This led to the creation of the following offices: 1) Specific Tax Division, 2) Litigation Section, 3) Processing Section and the 4) Office of the City Revenue Examiner. By September 1, 1954, a Training Unit was created through RMO No. V-4-47.

As an initial step towards decentralization, the Bureau created its first 2 Regional Offices in Cebu and in Davao on July 20, 1955 per RMO No. V-536. Each Regional Office was headed by a Regional Director, assisted by Chiefs of five Branches, namely: 1) Tax Audit, 2) Collection, 3) Investigation, 4) Legal and 5) Administrative. The creation of the Regional Offices marked the division of the Philippine islands into three revenue regions.

The Bureau's organizational set-up expanded beginning 1956 in line with the regionalization scheme of the government. Consequently, the Bureau's Regional Offices increased to eight and later into ten in 1957. The Accounting Machine Branch was also created in each Regional Office.

In January 1957, the position title of the head of the Bureau was changed from Collector to Commissioner. The last Collector and the first Commissioner of the BIR was Jose Aranas.

A significant step undertaken by the Bureau in 1958 was the establishment of the Tax Census Division and the corresponding Tax Census Unit for each Regional Office. This was done to consolidate all statements of assets, incomes and liabilities of all individual and resident corporations in the Philippines into a National Tax Census.

To strictly enforce the payment of taxes and to further discourage tax evasion, RA No. 233 or the Rewards Law was passed on June 19, 1959 whereby informers were rewarded the 25% equivalent of the revenue collected from the tax evader.

In 1964, the Philippines was re-divided anew into 15 regions and 72 inspection districts. The Tobacco Inspection Board and Accountable Forms Committee were also created directly under the Office of the Commissioner.

=== Marcos administration ===
The appointment of Misael Vera as Commissioner in 1965 led the Bureau to a "new direction" in tax administration. The most notable programs implemented were the "Blue Master Program" and the "Voluntary Tax Compliance Program". The first program was adopted to curb the abuses of both the taxpayers and BIR personnel, while the second program was designed to encourage professionals in the private and government sectors to report their true income and to pay the correct amount of taxes.

It was also during Commissioner Vera's administration that the country was further subdivided into 20 Regional Offices and 90 Revenue District Offices, in addition to the creation of various offices which included the Internal Audit Department (replacing the Inspection Department), Administrative Service Department, International Tax Affairs Staff and Specific Tax Department.

Providing each taxpayer with a permanent Tax Account Number (TAN) in 1970 not only facilitated the identification of taxpayers but also resulted to faster verification of tax records. Similarly, the payment of taxes through banks (per Executive Order No. 206), as well as the implementation of the package audit investigation by industry are considered to be important measures which contributed significantly to the improved collection performance of the Bureau.

The proclamation of Martial Law on September 21, 1972 marked the advent of the New Society and ushered in a new approach in the developmental efforts of the government. Several tax amnesty decrees issued by the President were promulgated to enable erring taxpayers to start anew. Organization-wise, the Bureau had also undergone several changes during the Martial Law period (1972–1980).

In 1976, under Commissioner Efren Plana's administration, the Bureau's National Office transferred from the Finance Building in Manila to its own 12-storey building in Quezon City, which was inaugurated on June 3, 1977. It was also in the same year that President Ferdinand Marcos promulgated the National Internal Revenue Code of 1977, which updated the 1934 Tax Code.

On August 1, 1980, the Bureau was further reorganized under the administration of Commissioner Ruben Ancheta. New offices were created and some organizational units were relocated for the purpose of making the Bureau more responsive to the needs of the taxpaying public.

=== C. Aquino administration ===
After the People Power Revolution in February 1986, a renewed thrust towards an effective tax administration was pursued by the Bureau. "Operation: Walang Lagay" was launched to promote the efficient and honest collection of taxes.

On January 30, 1987, the Bureau was reorganized under the administration of Commissioner Bienvenido Tan Jr. pursuant to Executive Order (EO) No. 127. Under the said EO, two major functional groups headed and supervised by a Deputy Commissioner were created, and these were: 1) the Assessment and Collection Group; and 2) the Legal and Internal Administration Group.

With the advent of the value-added tax (VAT) in 1988, a massive campaign program aimed to promote and encourage compliance with the requirements of the VAT was launched. The adoption of the VAT system was one of the structural reforms provided for in the 1986 Tax Reform Program, which was designed to simplify tax administration and make the tax system more equitable. It was also in 1988 that the Revenue Information Systems Services Inc. (RISSI) was abolished and transferred back to the BIR by virtue of a Memorandum Order from the Office of the President dated May 24, 1988. This transfer had implications on the delivery of the computerization requirements of the Bureau in relation to its functions of tax assessment and collection.

The entry of Commissioner Jose Ong in 1989 saw the advent of the "Tax Administration Program" which is the embodiment of the Bureau's mission to improve tax collection and simplify tax administration. The Program contained several tax reform and enhancement measures, which included the use of the Taxpayer Identification Number (TIN) and the adoption of the New Payment Control System and Simplified Net Income Taxation Scheme.

=== Ramos administration ===
The year 1993 marked the entry into the Bureau of its first female Commissioner, Liwayway Vinzons-Chato. In order to attain the Bureau's vision of transformation, a comprehensive and integrated program known as the ACTS or Action-Centered Transformation Program was undertaken to realign and direct the entire organization towards the fulfillment of its vision and mission.

It was during Commissioner Chato's term that a five-year Tax Computerization Project (TCP) was undertaken in 1994. This involved the establishment of a modern and computerized Integrated Tax System and Internal Administration System.

Further streamlining of the BIR was approved in July 1997 through the passage of EO No. 430, in order to support the implementation of the computerized Integrated Tax System. Highlights of the said EO included the: 1) creation of a fourth Revenue Group in the BIR, which is the Legal and Enforcement Group (headed by a Deputy Commissioner); and 2) creation of the Internal Affairs Service, Taxpayers Assistance Service, Information Planning and Quality Service and the Revenue Data Centers.

=== Estrada administration ===
With the advent of President Joseph Estrada's administration, a Deputy Commissioner of the BIR, Beethoven Rualo, was appointed as Commissioner of Internal Revenue. Under his leadership, priority reform measures were undertaken to enhance voluntary compliance and improve the Bureau's productivity. One of the most significant reform measures was the implementation of the Economic Recovery Assistance Payment (ERAP) Program, which granted immunity from audit and investigation to taxpayers who have paid 20% more than the tax paid in 1997 for income tax, VAT and/or percentage taxes.

In order to encourage and educate consumers/taxpayers to demand sales invoices and receipts, the raffle promo "Humingi ng Resibo, Manalo ng Libo-Libo" was institutionalized in 1999. The Large Taxpayers Monitoring System was also established under Commissioner Rualo's administration to closely monitor the tax compliance of the country's large taxpayers.

The coming of the new millennium ushered in the changing of the guard in the BIR with the appointment of Dakila Fonacier as the new Commissioner of Internal Revenue. Under his administration, measures that would enhance taxpayer compliance and deter tax violations were prioritized. The most significant of these measures include: full utilization of tax computerization in the Bureau's operations; expansion of the use of electronic Documentary Stamp Tax metering machine and establishment of tie-up with the national government agencies and local government units for the prompt remittance of withholding taxes; and implementation of Compromise Settlement Program for taxpayers with outstanding accounts receivable and disputed assessments with the BIR.

Memoranda of Agreement were also forged with the league of local government units and several private sector and professional organizations (i.e. MAP, TMAP, PCCI, FFCCCI, etc.) to help the BIR implement tax campaign initiatives.

On September 1, 2000, the Large Taxpayers Service (LTS) and the Excise Taxpayers Service (ETS) were established under EO No. 175 to reinforce the tax administration and enforcement capabilities of the BIR. Shortly after the establishment of said revenue services, a new organizational structure was approved on October 31, 2001 under EO No. 306 which resulted in the integration of the functions of the ETS and the LTS.

In line with the passage of the Electronic Commerce Act of 2000 on June 14, the Bureau implemented a Full Integrated Tax System (ITS) Rollout Acceleration Program to facilitate the full utilization of tax computerization in the Bureau's operations. Under the Program, seven ITS back-end systems were released in stages in RR 8 – Makati City and the Large Taxpayers Service.

=== Arroyo administration ===
Following the momentous events of EDSA II in January 2001, newly installed President Gloria Macapagal Arroyo appointed a former Deputy Commissioner, Atty. René G. Bañez, as the new Commissioner of Internal Revenue.

Under Commissioner Bañez's administration, the BIR's thrust was to transform the agency to make it taxpayer-focused. This was undertaken through the implementation of change initiatives that were directed to: 1) reform the tax system to make it simpler and suit the Philippine culture; 2) reengineer the tax processes to make them simpler, more efficient and transparent; 3) restructure the BIR to give it financial and administrative flexibility; and 4) redesign the human resource policies, systems and procedures to transform the workforce to be more responsive to taxpayers' needs.

Measures to enhance the Bureau's revenue-generating capability were also implemented, the most notable of which were the implementation of the Voluntary Assessment Program and Compromise Settlement Program and expansion of coverage of the creditable withholding tax system. A technology-based system that promotes the paperless filing of tax returns and payment of taxes was also adopted through the Electronic Filing and Payment System (eFPS).

With the resignation of Commissioner Bañez on August 19, 2002, Finance Undersecretary Cornelio C. Gison was designated as interim BIR Commissioner. Eight days later (on August 27, 2002), former Customs Commissioner, Guillermo L. Parayno Jr. was appointed as the new Commissioner of Internal Revenue (CIR).

Barely a month since his assumption to duty as the new CIR, Commissioner Parayno offered a Voluntary Assessment and Abatement Program (VAAP) to taxpayers with under-declared sales/receipts/income. To enhance the collection performance of the BIR, Commissioner Parayno adopted the use of new systems such as the Reconciliation of Listings for Enforcement or RELIEF System to detect under-declarations of taxable income by taxpayers and the electronic broadcasting system to enhance the security of tax payments. It was also under Commissioner Parayno's administration that the BIR expanded its electronic services to include the web-based TIN application and processing; electronic raffle of invoices/receipts; provision of e-payment gateways; e-substituted filing of tax returns and electronic submission of sales reports. The conduct of special operations on high-profile tax evaders, which resulted to the filing of tax cases under the Run After Tax Evaders (RATE) Program marked Commissioner Parayno's administration as well as the conduct of Tax Compliance Verification Drives and accreditation and registration of cash register machines and point-of-sale machines. To improve taxpayer service, the Bureau also established a BIR Contact Center in the National Office and eLounges in Regional Offices.

On October 28, 2006, Deputy Commissioner for Legal and Inspection Group, Jose Mario C. Buñag was appointed as full-fledged Commissioner of Internal Revenue. Under his administration, the Bureau attained success in a number of key undertakings, which included the expansion of the RATE Program to the Regional Offices; inclusion of new payment gateways, such as the Efficient Service Machines and the G-Cash and SMART Money facilities; implementation of the Benchmarking Method and installation of the Bureau's e-Complaint System, a new e-Service that allows taxpayers to log their complaints against erring revenuers through the BIR website. The Nationwide Rollout of Computerized Systems (NRCS) was also undertaken to extend the use of the Bureau's Integrated Tax System across its non-computerized Revenue District Offices. In 2007, the National Program Support for Tax Administration Reform (NPSTAR), a program funded by various international development agencies, was launched to improve the BIR efficiency in various areas of tax administration (i.e. taxpayer compliance, tax enforcement and control, etc.).

On June 29, 2007, Commissioner Buñag relinquished the top post of the BIR and was replaced by Deputy Commissioner for Operations Group, Lilian B. Hefti, making her the second lady Commissioner of the BIR. Commissioner Hefti focused on the strengthening of the use of business intelligence by embarking on data matching of income payments of withholding agents against the reported income of the concerned recipients. Information sharing between the BIR and the Local Government Units (LGUs) was also intensified through the LGU Revenue Assurance System, which aims to uncover fraud and non-payment of taxes. To enhance the Bureau's audit capabilities, the use of Computer-Assisted Audit Tools and Techniques (CAATTs) was also introduced in the BIR under her term.

With the resignation of Commissioner Hefti in October 2008, former BIR Deputy Commissioner for Legal and Enforcement Group, Sixto S. Esquivias IV was appointed as the new Commissioner of Internal Revenue. Commissioner Esquivias’ administration was marked with the conduct of nationwide closure of erring business establishments under the “Oplan Kandado” Program. A Taxpayer Feedback Mechanism (through the eComplaint facility accessible via the BIR Website) was also established under his term where complaints on erring BIR employees and taxpayers who do not pay taxes and do not issue ORs/invoices can be reported. In 2009, the Bureau revived its “Handang Maglingkod” Project where the best frontline offices were recognized for rendering effective taxpayer service.

When Commissioner Esquivias resigned in November 2009, Senior Deputy Commissioner, Joel L. Tan-Torres assumed the position of Commissioner of Internal Revenue. Under his administration, Commissioner Tan-Torres pursued a high visibility public awareness campaign on the Bureau's enforcement and taxpayers’ service programs. He institutionalized several programs/projects to improve revenue collections, and these include Project R.I.P (Rest in Peace); intensified filing of tax evasion cases under the re-invigorated RATE Program; conduct of Taxpayers Lifestyle Check and development of Industry Champions. Linkages with various agencies (i.e. LTO, SEC, BLGF, PHALTRA, etc.) were also established through the signing of several Memoranda of Agreement to improve specific areas of tax administration.

=== B. Aquino administration ===
Following the election of Benigno Aquino III, then Deputy Commissioner Kim S. Jacinto-Henares was appointed as the new Commissioner. During her first few months in office, she focused on the filing of tax evasion cases under the RATE Program.

=== Duterte administration ===
Rodrigo Duterte signed the Republic Act No. 10963 or the Tax Reform for Inclusion and Acceleration Act of 2017, which lowered personal income tax rates but increased taxes on certain goods, leading to a net increase in revenue. This excess revenue will be used to fund the major expansion in public infrastructure in the country (see Build! Build! Build! Plan).

== Functions ==
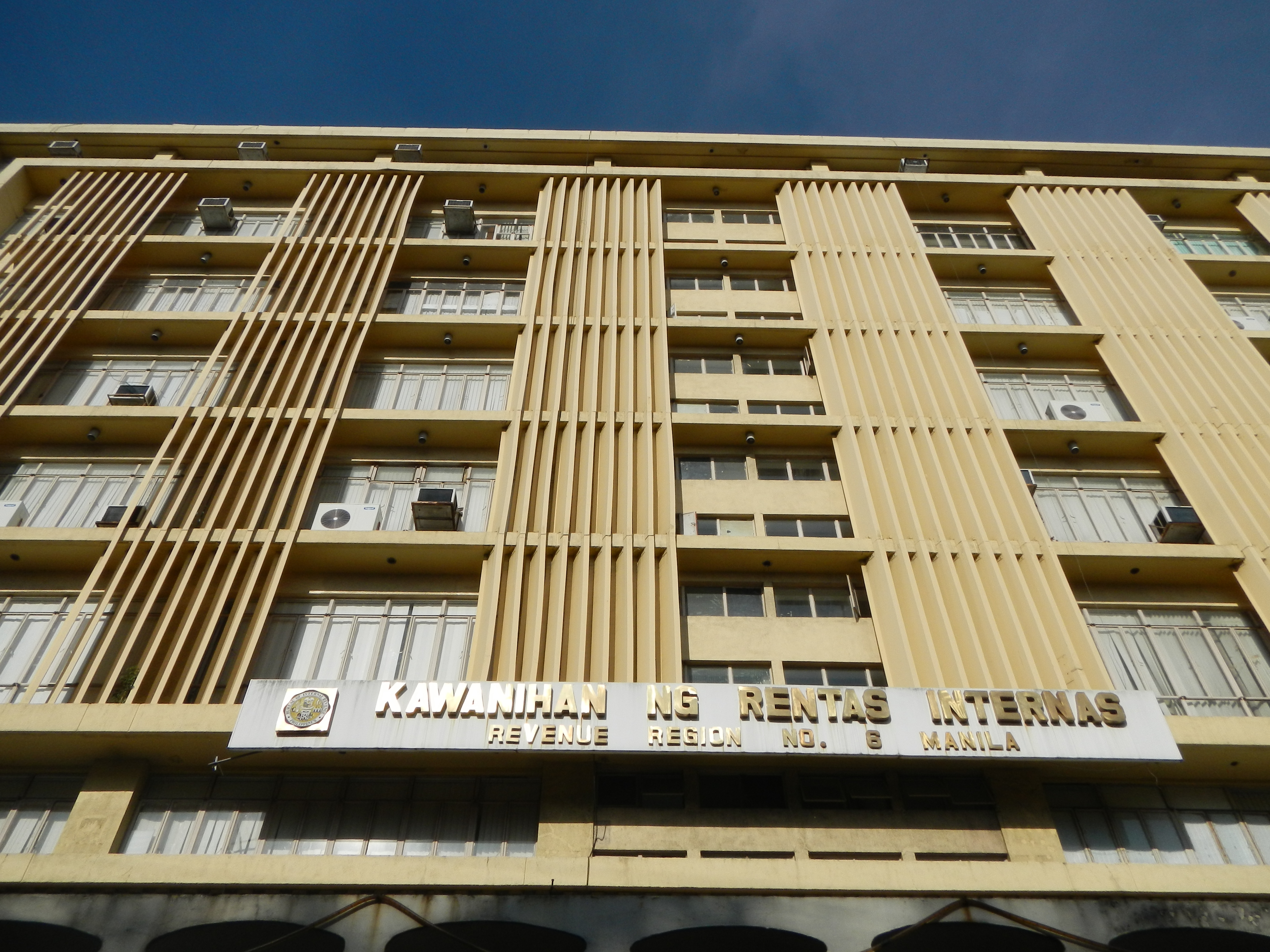
BIR Region No. 6 in Intramuros, Manila

The powers and duties of the Bureau of Internal Revenue are:

- Reduction and collection of all internal revenue taxes, fees and charges; and
- enforcement of all forfeitures, penalties, and fines connected therewith, including the execution of judgments in all cases decided in its favor by the Court of Tax Appeals and the ordinary courts;
- It shall also give effect to the administer supervisory and police powers conferred to it by the National Internal Revenue Code and special laws.

== New regulations ==
The Bureau regularly releases regulations, memorandums circulars, and rulings to clarify or change certain areas of the law.

Some are listed below:

- Revenue Regulations No. 18-2012 (Mandating Electronic Registration of Authority to Print)
- Revenue Regulation No. 6-2019 (Estate Tax Amnesty)

== Commissioners ==
Image	Name	Term	
Image	Name	Start	End
	John S. Ford	August 1, 1904	December 20, 1909
	Ellis Cromwell	December 21, 1909	February 11, 1912
	William T. Nolting	February 21, 1912	January 1, 1914
	James J. Rafferty	January 12, 1914	February 18, 1918
	Wenceslao Trinidad	February 19, 1918	April 6, 1923
	Juan P. Posadas Jr.	April 7, 1923	1934
	Alfredo L. Yatco	1934	December 31, 1938
	Bibiano L. Meer	January 3, 1939	March 13, 1944
	Jose Leido Sr.	April 9, 1945	June 27, 1946
	Bibiano L. Meer	June 28, 1946	October 4, 1950
	Saturnino David	October 5, 1950	January 13, 1954
	J. Antonio Araneta	January 18, 1954	July 5, 1955
	Silverio Blaquera	July 6, 1955	December 31, 1956
	Jose Arañas	January 2, 1957	July 21, 1959
	Melecio R. Domingo	July 22, 1959	February 19, 1962
	Benedicto B. Padilla	February 20, 1962	May 21, 1962
	Jose B. Lingad	May 22, 1962	May 31, 1963
	Amable M. Aguiluz	June 1, 1963	July 4, 1963
	Jose B. Lingad	July 5, 1963	September 24, 1963
	Ramon T. Oben	September 25, 1963	January 27, 1964
	Benjamin N. Tabios	January 28, 1964	August 25, 1965
	Misael P. Vera	August 30, 1965	September 25, 1975
	Efren I. Plana	September 26, 1975	April 30, 1980
	Ruben B. Ancheta	May 1, 1980	March 16, 1986
	Bienvenido A. Tan Jr.	March 18, 1986	December 30, 1988
	Jose U. Ong	January 2, 1989	May 14, 1993
	Liwayway Vinzons-Chato	May 18, 1993	July 1, 1998
	Beethoven L. Rualo	July 2, 1998	January 10, 2000
	Dakila B. Fonacier	January 11, 2000	February 4, 2001
	René G. Bañez	February 5, 2001	August 19, 2002
	Guillermo L. Parayno Jr.	August 30, 2002	July 11, 2005
	Jose Mario C. Buñag	December 15, 2005	July 1, 2007
	Lilian B. Hefti	September 17, 2007	November 2, 2008
	Sixto S. Esquivias IV	November 3, 2008	November 26, 2009
	Joel L. Tan-Torres	November 27, 2009	June 30, 2010
	Kim S. Jacinto-Henares	June 30, 2010	June 30, 2016
	Caesar Dulay	June 30, 2016	June 30, 2022
	Lilia Catris Guillermo	July 1, 2022	November 15, 2022
	Romeo Lumagui Jr.	November 15, 2022	November 12, 2025
	Charlito Martin Mendoza	November 12, 2025	November 12, 2026
	Rolando Ligon, Jr.	November 12, 2026	Incumbent
